= Escort Group B7 =

- Active: Second World War
- Country: United Kingdom
- Allegiance: British Empire
- Branch: Royal Navy
- Type: Escort Group
- Role: Anti-submarine warfare
- Size: ~Nine ships
- Part of: Western Approaches Command
- Garrison/HQ: Lisahally
- Engagements: Convoy ON 153; Convoy ONS 5

Commanders
- Notable commanders: Commander W. E. Banks; Cdr E. H. Tilden; Cdr Peter Gretton

Escort Group B7 was a British formation of the Royal Navy which saw action during the Second World War; principally in the Battle of the Atlantic.

== Formation ==
Escort Group B7 was one of seven such British naval groups which served with the Mid-Ocean Escort Force (MOEF). It provided convoy protection in the most dangerous middle section of the North Atlantic route. The MOEF was originally to be five American, five British and four Canadian groups. B7 was formed in the spring of 1942, following the inability of the USN to form groups A-4 and A-5 due to other commitments. To replace them, two new escort groups, Escort Group B6 and Escort Group B7, were formed.

== Service history ==
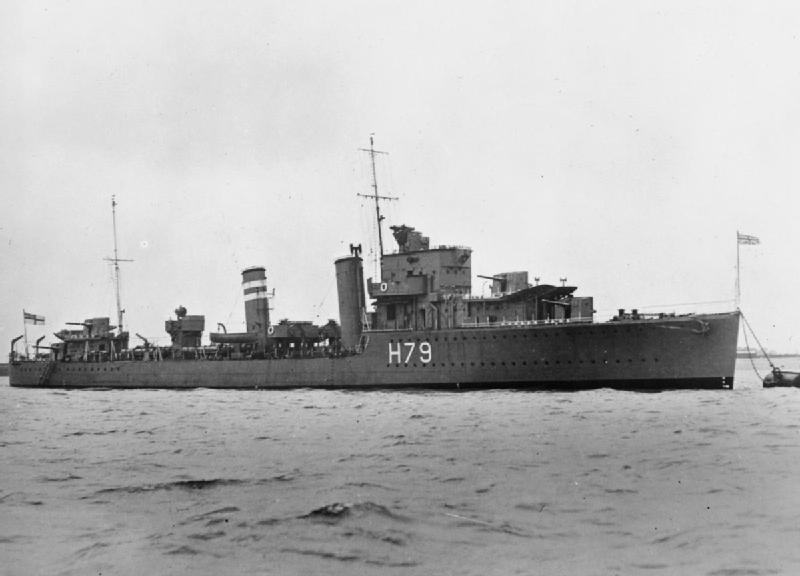
B-7 Group Leader HMS Firedrake

Led by HMS Firedrake, under the leadership of Commander William Banks, B7 comprised six Flower-class corvettes; HMS Loosestrife from the disbanded American group A-5 and Alisma, Coreopsis, Jonquil, Pink and Sunflower. These were joined later by the destroyers HMS Chesterfield and Ripley.

B7's first convoys, in the spring of 1942, were uneventful and as the Battle of the Atlantic increased in intensity in the summer and autumn, the group's charges were escorted without loss. In December, while escorting Convoy ON 153, the convoy came under attack and three ships were sunk. During this action, on 11 December, Firedrake was torpedoed by the U-boat U-211 and sank with the loss of 168 of her crew, including her commander and the group's Senior Officer – Escort (SOE), Commander Eric Tilden. Thirty-five survived the torpedoing but only 27 managed to get on board Sunflower (Captain John Treasure Jones).

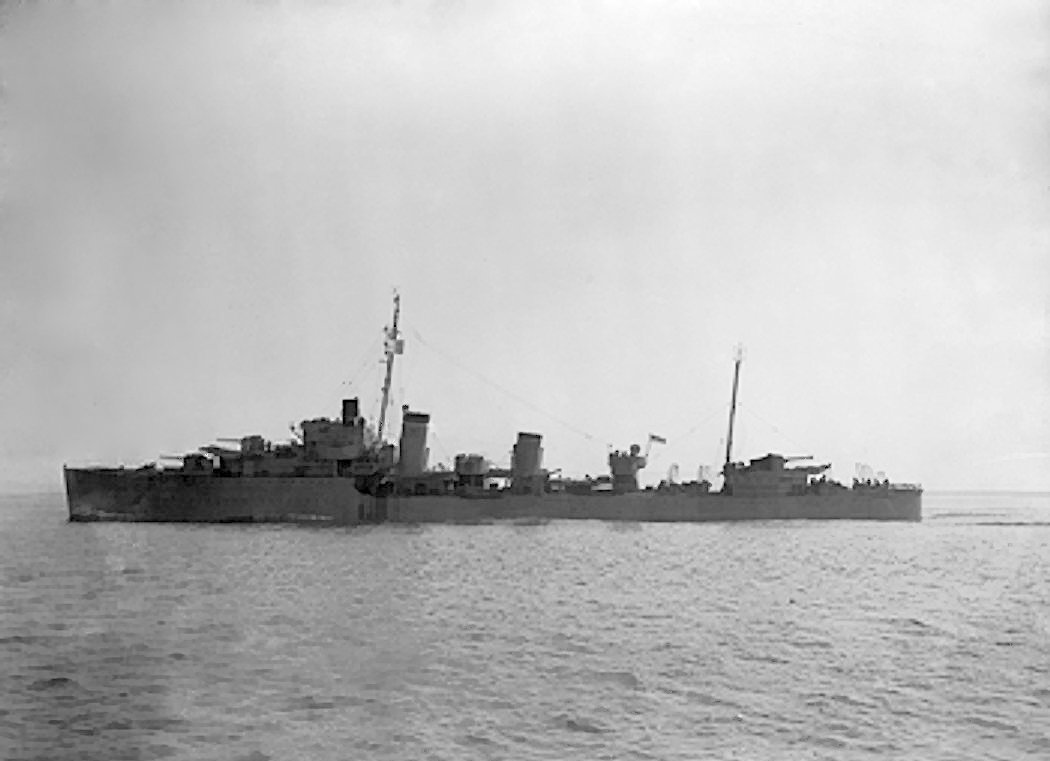
B7 Group Leader HMS Duncan

B7's new SOE was Commander Peter Gretton, of HMS Duncan, a tough and capable leader, who quickly molded the group to his own image. At this point B7 comprised the destroyers Duncan and Vidette, the frigate HMS Tay and the corvettes HMS Alisma, Loosestrife, Pink, Sunflower and Snowflake.

After several convoys had been escorted without loss, B7 covered Convoy HX 231 in April 1943. This came under attack by Wolfpack Lowenherz, which sank six ships, for the loss of two submarines destroyed and five damaged. In May 1943, B7 escorted Convoy ONS 5, sometimes regarded as the turning point of the Atlantic campaign. In a week-long battle against wolfpacks, Star, Amstel and later Fink, Convoy ONS 5 lost 13 ships, for the destruction of six U-boats and the disabling of seven. At least four of these were credited to B7. Later that month, returning with Convoy SC 130, B7 saw the destruction of between three and five U-boats (sources vary) for no loss. at least one of these was credited to B7. A series of uneventful convoys followed, as the U-boat Arm withdrew from the North Atlantic after Black May, while Gretton lobbied for a chance for B7 to operate as a Support Group. In October 1943 this was given, as the German U-boat arm launched its autumn offensive.

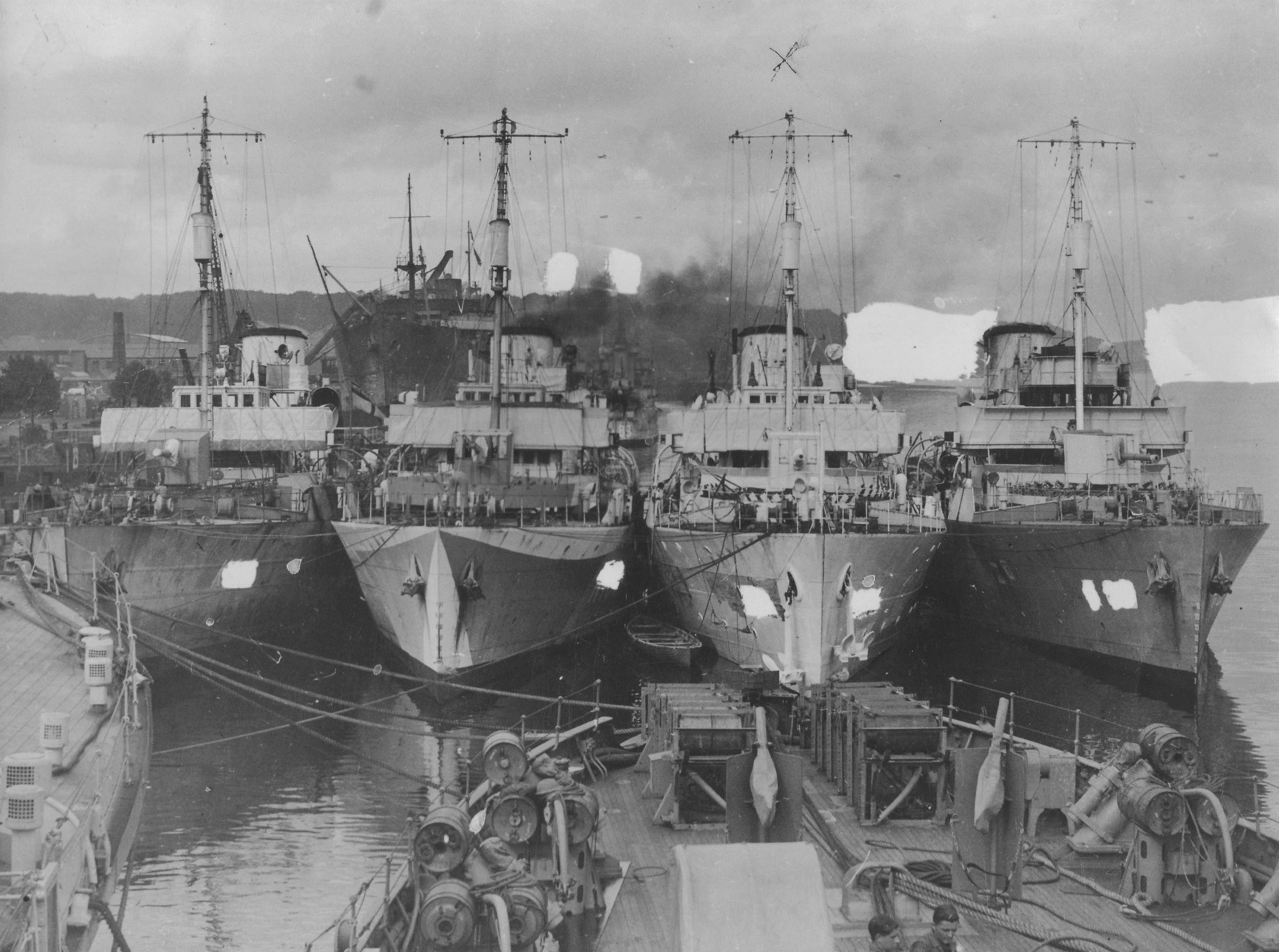
Corvettes of B7 Group moored in Londonderry. Alisma, Dianella, Sunflower and Kingcup. The white areas are where the official censor has painted out sensitive material

B7 was involved in the battles for convoys ONS 20 and ON 206, Convoy ON 207 and Convoy ON 208, during which nine U-boats were destroyed. The battle for Convoy ONS20/206 saw six U-boats sunk, of which U-631 was credited to Sunflower and U-844 was damaged by Duncan, to be destroyed later in an air attack. Convoy ON 207 saw three U-boats destroyed, U-282 by ships of B7, another shared with aircraft. B7 had steamed 6,700 nmi (12,400 km; 7,700 mi), crossing the Atlantic five times. The group members had refuelled at sea on six occasions and had re-armed with depth charges at sea. B7 returned to escort duty on the North Atlantic route, continuing without major incident until the group was disbanded in the summer of 1944 as part of the preparations for Operation Neptune, the naval contribution to the Normandy invasion.

== B7 ships ==
Ships in Escort Group B7
Ship	Flag	class	Notes
HMS Firedrake	Royal Navy	F-class destroyer	Torpedoed, 11 December 1942 U-211, scuttled, 168 †, 27 rescued
HMS Duncan	Royal Navy	D-class destroyer	Destroyer leader, replaced Firedrake
HMS Loosestrife	Royal Navy	Flower-class corvette	
HMS Alisma	Royal Navy	Flower-class corvette	
HMS Coreopsis	Royal Navy	Flower-class corvette	
HMS Jonquil	Royal Navy	Flower-class corvette	
HMS Pink	Royal Navy	Flower-class corvette	
HMS Sunflower	Royal Navy	Flower-class corvette	
HMS Chesterfield	Royal Navy	Clemson-class destroyer	
HMS Ripley	Royal Navy	Clemson-class destroyer	
HMS Vidette	Royal Navy	Admiralty V-class destroyer	
HMS Tay	Royal Navy	River-class frigate	New ship, joined September 1942

== Losses ==
=== Ships lost ===
- Firedrake was torpedoed and sunk by U-211 when escorting Convoy ON 153 on 16 December 1942.

=== U-boats destroyed ===
U-boats destroyed
U-boat	Flag	Ship	Flag	Date	Notes
U-192	Kriegsmarine	HMS Pink	Royal Navy	5 May 1943	Depth-charged
U-638	Kriegsmarine	HMS Loosestrife	Royal Navy	5/6 May 1943	Depth-charged
U-125	Kriegsmarine	HMS Oribi	Royal Navy	6 May 1943	Ramming, gunfire from HMS Snowflake
U-531	Kriegsmarine	HMS Snowflake	Royal Navy	6 May 1943	Depth-charge, Hedgehog HMS Vidette
U-381	Kriegsmarine	HMS Snowflake	Royal Navy	19 May 1943	Depth-charge, Hedgehog HMS Duncan
U-631	Kriegsmarine	HMS Sunflower	Royal Navy	17 October 1943	Depth-charged, gunfire HMS Snowflake
U-274	Kriegsmarine	Aircraft, HMS Duncan	Royal Navy	26 October 1943	Hedgehog
U-282	Kriegsmarine	HMS Duncan	Royal Navy	29 October 1943	Shared with HMS Vidette

== Commanding officers ==
Senior Officer Escort
Rank	Name	Dates
Commander	William Banks	4 May – 1 September 1942
Commander	Eric Tilden †	1–17 December 1942
Commander	Peter Gretton	December 1942 – May 1944
