= Convoy ON 207 =

- Part of World War II
Date	26–29 October 1943
Location	North Atlantic
Result	Allied victory

Belligerents
United Kingdom; Canada	(Nazi Germany) Germany

Commanders and leaders
Comm: Escort:Cdr JA Burnett	Admiral Karl Dönitz

Strength
52 ships 19 escorts	18 U-boats

Casualties and losses
no losses	3 U-boats destroyed

ON 207 was a North Atlantic convoy of the ONS/ON series which ran during the Battle of the Atlantic in World War II. It was the subject of a major U-boat attack in October 1943, the fourth battle in the German autumn offensive.

== Background ==
Still believing their new weapons and tactics gave them an advantage, despite the losses suffered by wolfpack Schlieffen and unaware of the poor results achieved during its attack on convoys ONS 20 and ON 206, Befehlshaber der Unterseeboote (BdU) re-organized the boats then in the North Atlantic into patrol line Siegfried to continue the offensive. The next convoy subjected to an attack was ON 207.

== Protagonists ==
ON 207 departed Liverpool on 18 October 1943, bound for New York. Composed of 52 ships it was escorted by Canadian escort group C-1, which comprised 3 destroyers; HMS Forester (Cdr JA Burnett as Senior Officer Escort), HMCS St Laurent and HMCS Assiniboine, frigate HMS Ettrick and 3 corvettes; HMCS Agassiz, HMCS Galt and HMS Celandine. The escort was augmented by the escort carrier HMS Biter, with 3 sloops HMS Crane, HMS Pheasant and HMS Chanticleer as escort, and the Merchant aircraft carrier Amastra, though she had to return to base early in the voyage with storm damage.

BdU had established the patrol line Seigfried of 18 boats. It consisted of 7 boats from the disbanded group Schlieffen, plus 11 others from bases in France and Germany. All the reinforcements were commanded by new skippers; 6 from Norway were also new boats, while the 5 from France were experienced boats with new commanders. The Siegfried boats had fuel problems, so a re-fueling group was established north of the Azores, of 3 U-tankers and a flak boat as escort.

When Allied intelligence learned of the position of Seigfried, it was decided to force an engagement with the wolfpack; several HX and SC convoys in the area were diverted away, whilst ON 207 was left to continue on course, as a bait convoy for the U-boats. ON 207 was massively reinforced by two support groups, 2nd EG commanded by Capt FJ Walker, and B-7 EG, commanded by Cdr P Gretton, which detached from a successful trip with ON 206. 2 EG comprised 4 sloops HMS Starling, HMS Magpie, HMS Wild Goose and HMS Woodcock and was accompanied by the escort carrier HMS Tracker. (Two of 2EG's sloops were absent at the time). B 7 group at this point comprised 2 destroyers HMS Duncan and HMS Vidette, and 2 corvettes Loosestrife and HMS Sunflower. B-7 also had 2 corvettes detached.

== The Action ==
On 23 October 1943 U-274 was sighted by a B-24 Liberator of No. 224 Squadron RAF attempting to make contact with the convoy. The Liberator attacked, and was joined by escorts Vidette and Duncan of B-7. They also attacked with depth charges, and U-274 was destroyed with all hands.

On 26 October U-91 was attacked by a Liberator of No. 10 Squadron RCAF, but she escaped with little damage. Later in the day, another Liberator of 10 Squadron attacked and destroyed U-420.

On 29 October B 7 detached to join ON 208, which was following several days behind; the group found U-282 shadowing the convoy. Duncan, Vidette and Sunflower attacked with depth charges and Hedgehog, and U-282 was destroyed with all hands.

During the time ON 207 was in Siegfried's patrol area, none of its boats were able to launch an attack, and none of ON 207s ships were harmed by enemy action.

While this action was taking place, Siegfried's refuelling group was also under attack, from two USN Hunter-killer groups centred on the escort carriers USS Block Island and USS Card. On the night of 25/26 October they attacked the U-tanker U-488, though she escaped with no damage; on 28 October they attacked two U-boats, U-220, which was destroyed, and U-256 which was damaged and forced to return to base. On 31 October two more boats were attacked, U-91, which escaped again, and U-584, which was destroyed. Later that day, the destroyer USS Borie destroyed U-405 in a 72-minute duel, that also saw Borie fatally damaged, sinking later that day.

ON 207 continued to its destination, arriving at New York on 4 November 1943.

== Conclusion ==
With 3 U-boats destroyed for no ships lost ON 207 was undoubtedly an Allied victory; but if Admiralty was hoping to inflict a crushing blow to UbW by wiping out an entire wolf pack, this success eluded them. Most of the U-boats were unable to make contact, and those that did were unable to shadow effectively in order to bring the pack together. Possibly the escorts were unfamiliar with their role as bait, and were too efficient at keeping the pack away from the convoy.

Following ON 207 BdU re-configured Siegfried to form 3 sub-groups to cover a wider area, but this failed to produce results. Also BdU was realizing that the new weapons and tactics underpinning the Autumn offensive were not being successful; and following the attack on ON 207 no further North Atlantic convoys were seriously harmed.

== Table ==
U-boats destroyed

Date	Number	Type	Captain	Casualties	Sunk by...
23 October 1943	U-274	VIIC	O/L Jordan	48	B-24 Liberator "Z" 224 Sqdn RAF; Vidette; Duncan
26 October 1943	U-420	VIIC	O/L Reese	49	B-24 Liberator "A" 10 Sqdn RCAF
29 October 1943	U-282	VIIC	O/L Muller	48	Duncan; Vidette; Sunflower
