= Convoy ONS 5 =

Convoy during naval battles of the Second World War

- Part of The Battle of the Atlantic of the Second World War
- Relief location map of the North Atlantic Ocean
Date	29 April – 6 May 1943
Location	North Atlantic

Belligerents
Germany	United Kingdom; Canada

Commanders and leaders
Karl Dönitz	Convoy: J. K. Brook; Escort Group B7: Peter Gretton

Strength
Star 16 U-Boats; Finke 27 U-boats	42 ships; 7 escorts

Casualties and losses
7 U-boats sunk; 7 U-boats damaged	13 ships sunk; 63,000 gross register tons (GRT)

ONS 5 was the 5th of the numbered ON/ONS convoys of Slow trade convoys Outbound from the British Isles to North America. The North Atlantic battle around it in May 1943 is regarded as the turning point of the Battle of the Atlantic in World War II. The battle ebbed and flowed over a week and involved more than 50 Allied ships and their escorts, against more than 30 U-boats. It saw severe losses on both sides and was almost the last Allied convoy to do so. Losses inflicted on the U-boats became a besetting feature of the campaign. It is seen as the point when the tactical and strategic advantage passed to the Allies, ushering in the period known to the Kriegsmarine as Black May.

== Background ==
=== Convoy ===
Convoy ONS 5 consisted of 43 ships bound from Liverpool to Halifax. The ships were either in ballast or carrying export goods. The convoy departed Liverpool on 21 April 1943, and would arrive in Halifax three weeks later on 12 May. The Convoy Commodore was J. K. Brook RNR, travelling in the Norwegian freighter Rena. The escort was provided by Escort Group B7 (Captain Peter Gretton) of the Mid-Ocean Escort Force, comprising the destroyers HMS Duncan, Vidette, the frigate HMS Tay and the corvettes HMS Sunflower, Snowflake, Loosestrife and Pink. The group also contained the trawlers, HMT Northern Gem and Northern Spray as rescue ships, and the fleet oiler MV British Lady for re-fuelling. The convoy was joined by other escort vessels as the battle progressed. Convoy ONS 5 was one of several Allied convoys at sea at the end of April; also in the Western Approaches were the outboud Convoy ON 180, and the inbound Convoy HX 234. Approaching the Americas were Convoy ONS 4 and Convoy ON 179; departing was Convoy SC 128, while in mid-Atlantic, due to pass Convoy ONS 5 east of Greenland, was Convoy SC 127. Two other eastbound convoys, Convoy HX 235 and Convoy HX 236, were also in mid-Atlantic, following a southerly route; over 350 ships were in the north Atlantic.

=== U-Boats ===
Ranged against the convoy were 58 U-boats in 3 patrol lines, gruppe Specht (Woodpecker) with 17 boats south of Greenland on the western side of the Air Gap, gruppe Meise (Blue Tit) with 30 boats east of Greenland covering the northern route, and gruppe Amsel (Blackbird) with 11 boats, south of Meise covering the southern route. Meise had been assembled to catch Convoy SC 127, which had been identified by B-Dienst, but on 26 April the convoy had slipped through a gap in the line and escaped undetected. On 27 April, BdU re-organised gruppe Meise and the boats furthest east formed a new gruppe Star (Starling), of sixteen U-boats, in a north–south line (a rake) at 30°W between latitudes 61°50′ and 57°00′N, roughly 420 nmi (780 km; 480 mi) east of Greenland. The boats were to be ready by the morning of 28 April to intercept the next ON convoy on the eight-day cycle and the northern end of the line was adjacent to the track of Convoy ONS 5. In the morning of 28 April the convoy was at 61°45′N, 29°11′W, turning onto a south-westerly heading. By the morning of 29 April it would pass through 30°W to 34°51′W.

== Ships involved ==
Convoy ONS 5 comprised 42 ships and 16 escorts (including reinforcements and detachments) 13 ships were sunk during the seven days that the convoy was under attack. Gruppe Star and gruppe Finke comprised 43 U-boats, not all in contact throughout; six were sunk.

== Action ==
Merchant ships departing Liverpool on 21 April 1943 were met by Escort Group B7 at 2:00 p.m. on 22 April and the convoy formed up in high winds and a heavy sea. At 10:00 p.m., the Polish freighter Modlin had to turn back with engine trouble. Station-keeping for the remaining ships became increasingly difficult as weather worsened on 23 April.

=== 24 April ===
At 4:55 p.m. in a moderate gale, B-17 C of 206 Squadron, from Benbecula, dropped six depth charges on the swirl of a diving U-boat. B-17 D found U-710 on the surface less than an hour later and sank it with depth charges as the U-boat attempted to fight back rather than submerge. U-710 was just 10 nmi (19 km; 12 mi) ahead of the convoy, though probably unaware of its proximity.

=== 25–27 April ===
Freighters Bornholm and Berkel collided on the evening of 25 April as a moderate west-northwest gale reduced convoy speed to two or three knots. Bornholm began taking on water and left the convoy the next day for Iceland. Vidette joined the convoy with three merchant ships from Iceland on 26 April while rescue trawler Northern Spray was standing by the straggling freighter Penhale until the straggler was ordered into Reykjavík so the trawler could rejoin the convoy. At noon on 26 April, BdU changed the Enigma machine cypher being used to transmit instructions to the U-boats. Allied intelligence services were unable to decrypt message traffic until the afternoon of 5 May. The weather moderated enough for Duncan, Vidette and Loosestrife to refuel from the escort oiler British Lady on 27 April and a salvage tug from Iceland rescued Bornholm that evening.

=== 28–29 April ===
On 28 April, Convoy ONS 5 arrived at the Star patrol area and was sighted at 9:00 a.m. by U-650, that held contact despite being forced to dive to avoid approaching aircraft at 10:14 a.m., 11:50 a.m. and 3:18 p.m. By nightfall U-650 had been joined by U-375, U-386, U-528 and U-537. The U-boats' contact reports alerted Gretton to the presence of U-boats on the convoy's port bow, beam, quarter and astern. Duncan and Tay made an unsuccessful depth charge attack after sighting a U-boat on the port bow at 6:30 p.m.

Gretton mounted a vigorous defence as the U-boats attacked after dark. At 8:00 p.m. Sunflower gained a radar contact at 3,800 yd (1.9 nmi), on closing lost the radar contact, gained a doubtful ASDIC contact, and dropped two depth charges. At 10:45 p.m. Duncan detected a radar contact at 3,500 yd (1.7 nmi) and upon closing lost the radar contact, gained an ASDIC contact at 1,500 yd (0.74 nmi) , lost contact at 1,100 yd (0.54 nmi) and dropped one depth charge. Upon returning to station Duncan got a radar contact at 2,300 yd (1.1 nmi) and upon closing sighted a U-boat which dived at 1,100 yd (0.54 nmi) and appeared on ASDIC at 500 yards (0.25 nmi). Duncan dropped a pattern of ten depth charges and while turning for another attack, gained another radar contact. The radar contact disappeared at a range of 3,000 yd (1.5 nmi). Duncan made no ASDIC contact, but dropped a depth charge at the estimated diving position before making another radar contact at 4,000 yd (2.0 nmi). As Duncan closed, the U-boat dived at a range of 1,500 yd (0.74 nmi). Duncan gained a good ASDIC contact and dropped a pattern of ten depth charges over a visible wake. Two more depth charges were dropped when a weak ASDIC contact was regained at 12:45 a.m.

At 1:32 a.m. Snowflake approached a hydrophone contact, and U-532 was detected visually and on radar at a range of 1,300 yd (0.64 nmi). U-532 launched six torpedoes. The closest one missed Snowflake by about 20 yd (18 m). After U-532 dived, Snowflake dropped three depth charges on the initial ASDIC contact and ten depth charges when contact was regained at 2,000 yd (0.99 nmi). Snowflake regained ASDIC contact at 1,400 yd (0.69 nmi) and dropped another pattern of ten depth charges. A short time later Tay dropped depth charges on a good ASDIC contact astern of the convoy. U-532 returned to base to repair depth charge damage. U-386 and U-528 were also damaged by these attacks and forced to return to base. U-386 arrived at St Nazaire on 11 May but U-528 was attacked in the Bay of Biscay and sunk by aircraft on the same day.

U-258 and U-650 maintained contact through the night and U-258 was submerged ahead of the convoy at dawn on 29 April. As the convoy passed overhead at 5:30 a.m., U-258 rose to periscope depth and launched two torpedoes at McKeesport. After one torpedo hit McKeesport on the starboard bow, Northern Gem detected U-258 and dropped three depth charges. Snowflake dropped a depth charge on a doubtful Asdic contact at 6:05 a.m. and two more depth charges at 6:15 a.m. after contact was regained at a range of 1,200 yd (0.59 nmi). McKeesport was abandoned, Northern Gem rescued all but one of the crew and it was scuttled by the escort. U-258 had also been damaged and was forced to return to base.

The Admiralty arranged reinforcements for Convoy ONS 5. HMS Oribi was detached from Convoy SC127 and the destroyers Penn, Panther, Impulsive and Offa, of the 3rd Support Group (Capt. J. M. McCoy) sailed from Newfoundland. The weather rapidly deteriorated and the convoy was sailing into a full gale by late afternoon of 29 April. About 5:00 p.m. Sunflower was struck by a wave which filled the crow's nest with water. Oribi was slowed to 11 kn (20 km/h; 13 mph) by the storm, but joined the convoy at 11:00 p.m. as Tay was attacking a U-boat astern. At 11:12 p.m. Duncan obtained an ASDIC contact at 1,100 yd (0.54 nmi) Duncan and Snowflake dropped depth charges to discourage the U-boats.

=== 30 April ===
The convoy found itself making less than 3 kn (5.6 km/h; 3.5 mph) headway into a Force 10 gale. The convoy started to be scattered, some ships ending up 30 nmi (56 km; 35 mi) from the convoy, and the escorts were kept busy rounding up stragglers. Oribi was able to refuel from the convoy oiler when the storm abated briefly on 30 April before the weather again made re-fuelling impossible, and a number of the destroyers became low on fuel, throwing doubt on whether they could continue. At 11:05 p.m. Snowflake made a radar contact at 3,300 yd (1.6 nmi) and dropped a depth charge after the U-boat dived when illuminated by star shell. The escorts dropped some random depth charges until dawn and Admiral Dönitz cancelled the chase on the evening of 1 May.

=== Regrouping 1–3 May ===
On 1 May Dönitz ordered boats from Star and Specht, with some newcomers to form a new patrol line to the west. This was group Finke (Finch) which was in place on 3 May numbering 27 boats to intercept the westbound Convoy SC 128. The 3rd Support Group destroyers joined the convoy at 1:00 a.m. 2 May, but the fuel situation aboard destroyers became increasingly desperate as weather and frequent course adjustments to avoid icebergs prevented refuelling. At 2:00 p.m. on 3 May Gretton was forced to take Duncan to St John's at economical speed [8 kn (15 km/h; 9.2 mph)] and he arrived with only 4 per cent of the fuel remaining. Command was assumed by Lt-Cdr R.E. Sherwood, of HMS Tay. The Asdic set aboard Tay failed just as Sherwood took over. Impulsive also detached to Iceland at 7:00 p.m. on 3 May, with Northern Gem carrying the survivors from McKeesport, while Penn and Panther detached for Newfoundland at 6:00 a.m. on 4 May.

=== 4 May ===
By 4 May the weather had abated to Force 6, and the convoy was making up to 6 kn (11 km/h; 6.9 mph), though reduced to 30 ships and 7 escorts. The rest were scattered and proceeding independently, including a group of four with Pink, trailing 80 nmi (150 km; 92 mi) behind the main body. The 1st Support Group sailed from Newfoundland at noon with the frigates Wear, Jed, Spey and the sloops Pelican and Sennen to replace Oribi and Offa whose fuel state would become dangerously low on 5 May. U-628 of group Finke, assembled to catch Convoy SC 128, sighted Convoy ONS 5 at 8:18 p.m. Two of the gathering group Finke U-boats were attacked by RCAF Cansos. One U-boat, thought to have been U-630 was sunk but is now believed to have been U-209, which was damaged in an attack by Canso W and foundered later while attempting to return to base. The other, U-438, was only slightly damaged in attacks by Canso E.

At 10:20 p.m. Vidette detected U-514 on radar at 3,600 yd (1.8 nmi) and approached until U-514 dived when the range dropped to 900 yd (0.44 nmi). Vidette fired a pattern of 14 depth charges causing damage that put U-514 out of the battle until 7 May. North Britain was straggling 6 nmi (11 km; 6.9 mi) astern of the convoy and sank within two minutes of being torpedoed by U-707 at 10:37 p.m. Vidette detected U-662 on radar at 3,600 yd (1.8 nmi) and upon closing, sighted U-732 at 1,000 yd (0.49 nmi) . The conning tower was still visible at 80 yd (73 m) and a pattern of 14 depth charges dropped by eye caused damage requiring U-732 to return to base.

=== 5 May ===
U-264 and U-628 each launched five torpedoes shortly after midnight. Harbury was hit at 12:46 a.m.; Harperly was hit by two torpedoes at 1:04 a.m. and West Maximus was hit by a torpedo at 1:03 a.m., another at 1:10 a.m. and a third at 1:35 a.m. Both U-boats claimed three ships; but modern historians credit the first freighter to U-628 and the other two to U-264. One of the torpedoes passed within 125 yd (114 m) of Snowflake. At 1:22 a.m. Snowflake started closing a radar contact illuminated by star shells fired by Oribi; and both ships dropped depth charges. The gunfire encouraged U-264 to dive and the depth charges forced U-270 to return to base. U-358 torpedoed Bristol City at 2:25 a.m. and Wentworth at 2:30 a.m. At dawn, Lorient was missing from the convoy. No witnesses to her destruction survived the battle. Before U-125 was sunk, she sent a radio report about sinking a steamship sailing independently and historians assume Lorient straggled from the convoy and was torpedoed by U-125.

Northern Spray picked up 143 survivors from North Britain, Harbury, Harperly and West Maximus by 7:00 a.m. and was detached to take the rescued men to Newfoundland. Loosestrife assumed the role of rescue ship and picked up the survivors from Bristol City and Wentworth. At 10:57 a.m. Oribi sighted a surfaced U-boat at 7 nmi (13 km; 8.1 mi). U-223, U-231, U-621 and U-634 dived as Oribi approached. Oribi dropped 14 depth charges and U-638 torpedoed Dolius at 12:40 p.m. Sunflower gained an ASDIC contact at 1,200 yd (0.59 nmi) within minutes and destroyed U-638 with a pattern of ten depth charges, before rescuing survivors from Dolius. Tay, Oribi, and Offa refuelled from convoy oilers that afternoon. Selvistan, Gharinda and Bonde were hit by a salvo of four torpedoes from U-266 within the space of a few minutes about 7:50 p.m. Selvistan and Bonde sank within two minutes. Tay rescued survivors from the ships while Offa made depth charge attacks, damaging U-266, which was sunk by aircraft on 15 May while attempting to reach base for repairs.

At midday, Pink (Lieutenant Robert Atkinson) made a firm ASDIC contact 2,200 yd (1.1 nmi) ahead of her small convoy, still proceeding separately. Pink spent 90 minutes making five depth charge and hedgehog attacks. Pink received post-war credit for destruction of U-192 but later analysis concluded that the victim, U-358, returned to base after being damaged. U-584 torpedoed West Madaket while Pink was attacking U-358 and Pink rescued the survivors.

=== Night of 5/6 May ===
As dark fell on 5 May, Tay counted seven U-boats surfaced in the convoy's path but Convoy ONS 5 was entering the fog formed where the warm Gulf Stream meets the cold Labrador Current off the Grand Banks of Newfoundland. Visibility dropped to 1 nmi (1.9 km; 1.2 mi) by 10:02 p.m. and to 100 yd (91 m) by 1:00 a.m. British centimetric radar enabled the escorts to see while the U-boats could not. Many of the U-boats involved never returned to base and historians struggle to correlate reports of the dozens of ships interacting briefly in no fewer than 24 attempted attacks. At 11:09 p.m. Vidette made a radar contact at 5,100 yd (2.5 nmi) and a second appeared while closing the first. Vidette dropped a pattern of ten depth charges on a submarine seen submerging 700 yd (0.35 nmi) ahead, and then moved on to drop a pattern of five depth charges on the second contact which became visible at 900 yd (0.44 nmi). Historians suggest the first attack destroyed U-531.

At 0:30 a.m. Loosestrife made a radar contact at 5,200 yd (2.6 nmi). The U-boat turned away when the range reached 500 yd (460 m) and fired two torpedoes at Loosestrife from its stern tubes while diving. Loosestrife dropped a pattern of ten depth charges as it overran the diving U-boat. A reported slick of oil and debris is believed to have been produced by the destruction of U-192. At 2:52 a.m. Oribi collided with U-125 first seen at a range of 200 yd (180 m) while investigating an ASDIC contact, but lost contact after the collision. While pursuing an ASDIC contact, Snowflake detected U-125 on radar at 3:54 a.m., observed heavy conning tower damage by searchlight at a range of 100 yd (91 m), and watched the crew detonate scuttling charges and abandon ship. The escorts continued their protective patrolling around the convoy rather than attempt to rescue of the U-boat crew assumed to have sunk Lorient.

At 4:06 a.m. Vidette made an ASDIC contact at 800 yd (730 m), and made a hedgehog attack causing two explosions. Historians suggest this attack destroyed U-630 At 4:43 a.m. Sunflower made an ASDIC contact at 1,200 yd (0.59 nmi) and subsequently sighted a surfacing U-boat. Sunflower rammed U-533 and dropped two depth charges as U-533 attempted to dive. Loosestrife and U-533 were able to make repairs and remain at sea. At 5:52 a.m. Pelican was leading the 1st Support Group to reinforce the convoy escort when it detected a radar contact at 5,300 yd (2.6 nmi). Pelican made visual contact at 300 yd (270 m), dropped a pattern of ten depth charges where the U-boat dived and dropped a second pattern of nine depth charges after regaining contact. Historians suggest these attacks destroyed U-438. Finke had already outlasted its usefulness and faced mounting losses if the attack continued. Realising his mistake, Dönitz called off the assault on 6 May and ordered Finke to retire.

== Aftermath ==
=== Analysis ===
Convoy ONS 5 had been attacked by over 40 U-boats. With the loss of 13 ships totalling 63,000 GRT, the escorts had inflicted a loss of 6 U-boats and serious damage on 7 more. The convoy escorts had mastered the art of convoy protection; the weapons and expertise at their disposal meant that henceforth they would be able to protect their charges, repel attack and to inflict significant losses on the attacker. Convoy ONS 5 marked the turning point in the battle of the Atlantic. Following this action, the Allies inflicted defeats on the U-boat Arm known as Black May. This culminated in Dönitz withdrawing the U-boats from the North Atlantic. The naval official historian, Stephen Roskill wrote,

This seven day battle, fought against thirty U-boats, is marked only by latitude and longitude, and has no name by which it will be remembered; but it was, in its own way, as decisive as the Quiberon Bay or the Nile.

== Losses ==
=== Allied ships lost ===
Ships sunk in Convoy ONS 5
Date	Name	Year	GRT	Flag	Notes
29 April 1943	McKeesport	1919	6,198	United States	U-258, 61°22′N, 30°20′W, 1† 67 surv, scuttled HMS Tay
5 May 1943	Lorient	1921	4,185	United Kingdom	U-125, 54°N, 44°W, 46 casualties
4 May 1943	North Britain	1940	4,635	United Kingdom	U-707, 55°08′N, 42°43′W 34† 12 surv
5 May 1943	Harbury	1934	5,081	United Kingdom	U-628, U-364 55°01′N, 42°59′W, 7† 43 surv
5 May 1943	West Maximus	1919	5,561	United States	U-264, 55°10′N, 43°W, 5† 57 surv
5 May 1943	Harperley	1930	4,586	United Kingdom	U-264, 55°N, 42°58′W, 11† 38 surv
5 May 1943	Bristol City	1920	2,864	United Kingdom	U-358, 54°N, 43°55′W, 15† 29 surv
5 May 1943	Wentworth	1919	5,212	United Kingdom	U-358, U-628, 53°59′N, 43°55′W, 5† 42 surv
5 May 1943	Dolius	1924	5,507	United Kingdom	U-638, 54°N, 43°35′W, 4† 68 surv
5 May 1943	West Madaket	1918	5,565	United States	U-584, 54°47′N, 45°12′W, 0† 61 surv, scuttled HMS Pink
5 May 1943	Selvistan	1924	5,136	United Kingdom	U-266, 6† 40 surv
5 May 1943	Gharinda	1919	5,306	United Kingdom	U-266, 53°10′N, 44°40′W, 0† 92 surv
5 May 1943	Bonde	1936	1,570	Norway	U-266, 53°28′N, 44°20′W, 14† 12 surv

=== U-boats lost ===
Date	Boat	Type	Place	Notes
4 May 1943	U-209	VIIC	52°00′N 38°00′W	Missing, Canso flying-boat W/5 Sqdn RCAF, 46†
5 May 1943	U-531	IXC/40	52°48′N 45°18′W	D/c, HMS Vidette, 54†
5 May 1943	U-638	VIIC	54°12′N 44°05′W	D/c, HMS Sunflower, 44†
6 May 1943	U-125	IXC	52°30′N 45°20′W	Ramming, gunfire, HMS Oribi, HMS Snowflake 54†
6 May 1943	U-192	IXC/40	53°06′N 45°02′W	D/c, HMS Loosestrife, 55†
6 May 1943	U-438	VIIC	52°00′N 45°10′W	D/c, HMS Pelican, 48†
6 May 1943	U-630	VIIC	52°31′N 44°50′W	D/c, HMS Vidette, 47†

== See also ==
- Convoy Battles of World War II
