= U125 =

U125 or U-125 may refer to:

- German submarine U-125, one of several German submarines
- British Aerospace BAe 125 as used by the Japan Air Self-Defence Force
