= HMS Dart (K21) =

1943 River-class frigate of the Royal Navy

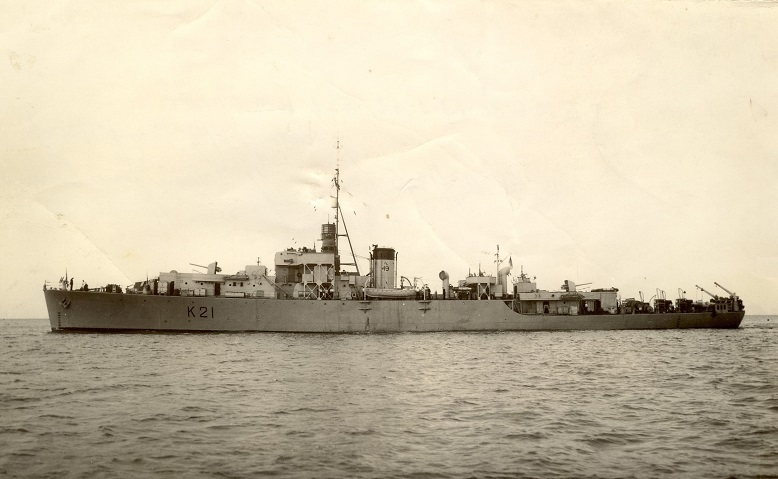

History

United Kingdom
- Name: Dart
- Namesake: River Dart
- Builder: Blyth Shipbuilding & Drydock, Blyth
- Laid down: 8 September 1941
- Launched: 10 October 1942
- Commissioned: 13 May 1943
- Fate: Scrapped 1957

General characteristics
- Class & type: River-class frigate
- Displacement: 1,370 long tons (1,390 t); 1,830 long tons (1,860 t) (deep load)
- Length: 283 ft (86.26 m) p/p; 301.25 ft (91.82 m)o/a
- Beam: 36.5 ft (11.13 m)
- Draught: 9 ft (2.74 m); 13 ft (3.96 m) (deep load)
- Propulsion: 2 × Admiralty 3-drum boilers, 2 shafts, reciprocating vertical triple expansion, 5,500 ihp (4,100 kW)
- Speed: 20 knots (37.0 km/h)
- Range: 440 long tons (450 t; 490 short tons) oil fuel; 7,200 nautical miles (13,334 km) at 12 knots (22.2 km/h)
- Complement: 107
- Armament: 2 × QF 4-inch (102 mm) Mk.XIX guns, single mounts CP Mk.XXIII; up to 10 × QF 20 mm Oerlikon AA guns on twin mounts Mk.V and single mounts Mk.III; 1 × Hedgehog 24 spigot A/S projector; up to 150 depth charges

HMS Dart (K21) was a River-class frigate of the Royal Navy. Dart was built to the RN's specifications as a Group I River-class frigate.

The River class was a class of 151 frigates launched between 1941 and 1944 for use as anti-submarine convoy escorts and were named for rivers in the United Kingdom. The ships were designed by naval engineer William Reed, of Smith's Dock Company of South Bank-on-Tees, to have the endurance and anti-submarine capabilities of the Black Swan-class sloops, while being quick and cheap to build in civil dockyards using the machinery (e.g. reciprocating steam engines instead of turbines) and construction techniques pioneered in the building of the Flower-class corvettes. Its purpose was to improve on the convoy escort classes in service with the Royal Navy at the time, including the Flower class.

She sailed from Blyth, Northumberland in May 1943 for Tobermory, to work-up before being sent to join a group on ocean escort of convoys. After a few weeks working-up the ship and the crew, Admiral Stephenson would then personally inspect each escort and put the Captain and crew through a stiff test before releasing them for operational service. Anti-submarine exercises were conducted on 19 June.

== Service history ==
On 25 June Dart sailed from the Firth of Clyde escorting a mixed convoy of small RN ships to the Mediterranean Station.

Once on station Cdr. Treasure Jones formed and took command of Escort Group 49 as the group's Senior Officer – Escort (SOE). It was one of seven such British naval groups which were to escort convoys through the Mediterranean from Gibraltar to Port Said and vice versa, using Gibraltar and Alexandria as its bases. The Germans had been chased out of Africa; the Allies had landed in Sicily and were fighting their way up Italy at this time. Previous to this it had been impossible to take convoys through the Mediterranean.

Escort Group 49
Name	Pennant	Class
HMS Dart	K21	River-class frigate
HMS Primula	K14	Flower-class corvette
HMS Gloxinia	K22	Flower-class corvette
HMS Rye	J76	Bangor-class minesweeper
HMS Rosario	J219	Algerine-class minesweeper
HMS Sharpshooter	N68	Halcyon-class minesweeper

As described by the Captain :

This was a comparatively peaceful mission compared to the Battle of the Atlantic, which was at its height in 1943 and 1944. It was almost like running a slow train. We would pick up our eastbound convoy just west of the Straits of Gibraltar, drop some off at Gibraltar and pick some up from there. Then, on passing Oran we would drop off ships for there and others would join us. And so on, it went at Algiers and the small ports on the north coast of Algeria, where supplies were unloaded for the armies. Then Tunis, Malta, Tobruk, Alexandria and finally Port Said, followed, of course, by the same westbound.
During this time we met up with the occasional submarine; it was mostly Italian submarines that operated here and they were rather ineffectual. Our most dangerous spot was off the African coast, between Oran and Algiers. Here we were often attacked by German aircraft based in the South of France; these aircraft usually attacked with torpedoes, but they had little success and lost many aircraft. Another spot where we sometimes met a few enemy aircraft was between Malta and Tobruk, on the African coast; these aircraft came from Crete and let go a stick of bombs from a height clear of our anti-aircraft guns.

HMS Dart convoys

- Convoy UGS.11 (Jun 1943: Hampton Roads - Port Said.)
- Convoy KMS.19G (Jun 1943: Clyde - Passed Gibraltar)
- Convoy GUS.10X (Jul 1943: Tripoli, Libya - Hampton Roads)
- Convoy KMS.29 (Oct 1943: Gibraltar - Port Said)
- Convoy GUS.21 (Nov 1943: Port Said - Hampton Roads)
- Convoy UGS.23 (Nov 1943: Hampton Roads - Port Said)
- Convoy GUS.24 (Dec 1943: Port Said - Hampton Roads)
- Convoy KMS.35 (Dec 1943: Gibraltar - Port Said)
- Convoy MKS.37 (Jan 1944: Port Said - Gibraltar)
- Convoy MKS.37G (Jan 1944: Gibraltar - Rendezvous with SL.146)
- Convoy KMS.39 (Jan 1944: Gibraltar - Port Said)
- Convoy GUS.31 (Feb 1944: Port Said - Hampton Roads)
- Convoy UGS.33 (Feb 1944: Hampton Roads - Port Said)
- Convoy MKS.44 (Mar 1944: Port Said - Gibraltar)
- Convoy KMS.43 (Mar 1944: Gibraltar - Port Said)
- Convoy GUS.38 (Apr 1944: Port Said - Hampton Roads)
- Convoy UGS.39 (Apr 1944: Hampton Roads - Port Said)
- Convoy KMS.46 (Apr 1944: Gibraltar - Port Said)
- Convoy MKS.50 (May 1944: Port Said - Gibraltar)
- Convoy KMF.31 (May 1944: Clyde - Port Said)
- Convoy KMS.52 (Jun 1944: Gibraltar - Port Said)
- Convoy MKS.56 (Jul 1944: Port Said - Gibraltar)
- Convoy KMS.58 (Aug 1944: Gibraltar - Port Said)
- Convoy GUS.50 (Aug 1944: Port Said - Hampton Roads)
- Convoy UGS.51 (Aug 1944: Hampton Roads - Port Said)
- Convoy MKS.62 (Sep 1944: Port Said - Gibraltar)
- Convoy KMS.64 (Oct 1944: Gibraltar - Port Said)
- Convoy GUS.56 (Oct 1944: Port Said - Hampton Roads)
- Convoy KMS.69G (Nov 1944: Ex OS95/ KMS69 - Gibraltar)
- Convoy KMS.69 (Nov 1944: Gibraltar - Dispersed 1800Z Off Malta)
- Convoy MKF.36A (Dec 1944: Gibraltar - Liverpool)
- Convoy KMF.41 (Mar 1945: Clyde - Gibraltar)
- Convoy MKF.41 (Mar 1945: Gibraltar - Liverpool)
- Convoy KMF.42 (Mar 1945: Clyde - Gibraltar)
- Convoy MKF.43 (Apr 1945: Gibraltar - Liverpool)

Towards the end of 1944, things were so peaceful that convoys were discontinued and the escort force was disbanded. Dart was re-fitted at Malta and then, in April 1945, returned to Britain for the final phase of the U-boat War.

Dart was then attached to a Senior Group supporting shipping in the Irish Sea as U-boats had developed the snorkel and were attacking shipping in coastal waters around the Irish Sea. They were escorting a convoy between Ireland and the Pembrokeshire shore of Wales the night that hostilities were to cease at midnight 8 May 1945. The next two days Dart was detailed to remain in the area and escort any surrendering U-boats to harbour; two did surface and surrendered.

== Fate ==
Sold to be broken up for scrap in November 1956. Scrapped in 1957.

== Sources ==
- Elliott, Peter (1977). Allied Escort Ships of World War II. ISBN 0-356-08401-9.
- Colledge, J. J.; Warlow, Ben (2006) [1969]. Ships of the Royal Navy: The Complete Record of all Fighting Ships of the Royal Navy (Rev. ed.). London: Chatham Publishing. ISBN 978-1-86176-281-8. OCLC 67375475.
- Treasure Jones, John (2008). Tramp to Queen. ISBN 978-0-7524-4625-7.
