= German submarine U-710 =

German World War II submarine

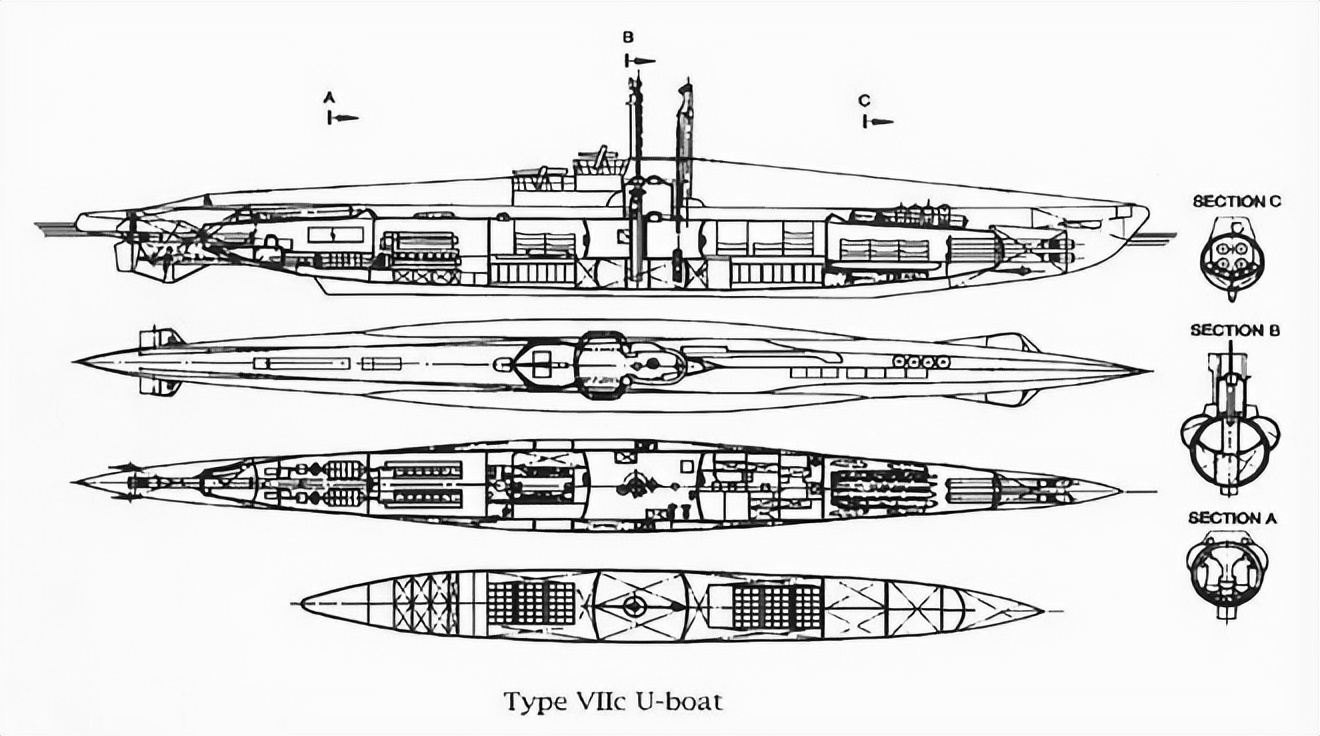
- A cross-section of a Type VIIC submarine

History

Nazi Germany
- Name: U-710
- Ordered: 15 August 1940
- Builder: H. C. Stülcken Sohn, Hamburg
- Yard number: 774
- Laid down: 4 June 1941
- Launched: 12 May 1942
- Commissioned: 2 September 1942
- Fate: Sunk on 24 April 1943

General characteristics
- Class & type: Type VIIC submarine
- Displacement: 769 t (757 long tons) surfaced; 871 t (857 long tons) submerged
- Length: 67.10 m (220 ft 2 in) o/a; 50.50 m (165 ft 8 in) pressure hull
- Beam: 6.20 m (20 ft 4 in) o/a; 4.70 m (15 ft 5 in) pressure hull
- Height: 9.60 m (31 ft 6 in)
- Draught: 4.74 m (15 ft 7 in)
- Installed power: 2,800–3,200 PS (2,100–2,400 kW; 2,800–3,200 bhp) (diesels); 750 PS (550 kW; 740 shp) (electric)
- Propulsion: 2 shafts; 2 × diesel engines; 2 × electric motors
- Speed: 17.7 knots (32.8 km/h; 20.4 mph) surfaced; 7.6 knots (14.1 km/h; 8.7 mph) submerged
- Range: 8,500 nmi (15,700 km; 9,800 mi) at 10 knots (19 km/h; 12 mph)
- Test depth: 230 m (750 ft); Crush depth: 250–295 m (820–968 ft)
- Complement: 44–60 officers & ratings
- Armament: 5 × 53.3 cm (21 in) torpedo tubes (four bow, one stern); 14 × torpedoes; 1 × 8.8 cm (3.46 in) deck gun (220 rounds); 1 × twin 2 cm (0.79 in) anti-aircraft guns

Service record
- Part of: 5th U-boat Flotilla; 2 September 1942 – 1 April 1943; 7th U-boat Flotilla; 1 – 24 April 1943
- Identification codes: M 49 924
- Commanders: Oblt.z.S. Dietrich von Carlewitz; 2 September 1942 – 24 April 1943
- Operations: 1 patrol: 15 – 24 April 1943
- Victories: None

German submarine U-710 was a Type VIIC U-boat of Nazi Germany's Kriegsmarine during World War II. She had an extremely short career, only conducting one patrol in April 1943 and attacking no ships. Just nine days after starting her first patrol, she was sunk by a B-17 Flying Fortress with the loss of all hands.

== Design ==
German Type VIIC submarines were slight modifications of their Type VIIB predecessors; the length and weight were slightly larger and an active sonar was added. U-710 had a displacement of 769 tonnes (757 long tons) when at the surface and 871 tonnes (857 long tons) while submerged. She had a total length of 67.10 m (220 ft 2 in), a pressure hull length of 50.50 m (165 ft 8 in), a beam of 6.20 m (20 ft 4 in), a height of 9.60 m (31 ft 6 in), and a draught of 4.74 m (15 ft 7 in). The submarine was powered by two Germaniawerft F46 four-stroke, six-cylinder supercharged diesel engines producing a total of 2,800 to 3,200 metric horsepower (2,060 to 2,350 kW; 2,760 to 3,160 shp) for use while surfaced, two Garbe, Lahmeyer & Co. RP 137/c double-acting electric motors producing a total of 750 metric horsepower (550 kW; 740 shp) for use while submerged. She had two shafts and two 1.23 m (4 ft) propellers. The boat was capable of operating at depths of up to 230 metres (750 ft).

The submarine had a maximum surface speed of 17.7 knots (32.8 km/h; 20.4 mph) and a maximum submerged speed of 7.6 knots (14.1 km/h; 8.7 mph). When submerged, the boat could operate for 80 nautical miles (150 km; 92 mi) at 4 knots (7.4 km/h; 4.6 mph); when surfaced, she could travel 8,500 nautical miles (15,700 km; 9,800 mi) at 10 knots (19 km/h; 12 mph). U-710 was fitted with five 53.3 cm (21 in) torpedo tubes (four fitted at the bow and one at the stern), fourteen torpedoes, one 8.8 cm (3.46 in) deck gun, 220 rounds, and one twin 2 cm (0.79 in) anti-aircraft gun. The boat had a complement of between forty-four and sixty.

== Service ==
=== Construction and training ===
U-710 was ordered on 15 August 1940 and laid down on 4 June 1941 at H. C. Stülcken Sohn, Hamburg, as yard number 774. The submarine was launched on 12 May 1942 and commissioned on 2 September 1942 under the command of Oberleutnant zur See Dietrich von Carlewitz. Upon commissioning, U-710 was attached to the 5th U-boat Flotilla for training.

=== First patrol and sinking ===
On 1 April 1943, U-710 completed training and was attached to the 7th U-boat Flotilla for active service. Fourteen days later, the submarine departed from Kiel on her first service patrol, sailing through the North Sea and into the North Atlantic Ocean.

On 24 April 1943, while the submarine was sailing in the North Atlantic south of Iceland, U-710 was spotted on the surface by a British B-17 Flying Fortress of No. 206 Squadron RAF, patrolling in support of convoy ONS 5. The bomber attacked through heavy anti-aircraft fire and dropped six shallow depth charges, which seemed to lift the boat out of the water'. Shortly afterward, a second attack by the B-17 sank the U-boat at 61°25′N 19°48′W. The B-17 crew reported seeing some twenty-five German sailors swimming near the wreck of U-710, but all 49 hands were lost.

== Bibliography ==
- Blair, Clay (1998). Hitler's U-Boat War: The Hunted 1942–1945. New York: Random House. ISBN 0-679-45742-9.
- Gröner, Eric; Jung, Dieter; Maass, Martin (1991). German Warships 1815-1945: U-boats and Mine Warfare Vessels. Vol. 2. Translated by Thomas, Keith; Magowan, Rachel. London: Conway Maritime Press. ISBN 0-85177-593-4.
- Kemp, Paul (1997). U-boats Destroyed: German Submarine Losses in the World Wars. Annapolis, MD: Naval Institute Press. ISBN 978-1-85409-515-2.
