= HMS Sunflower (K41) =

Flower-class corvette

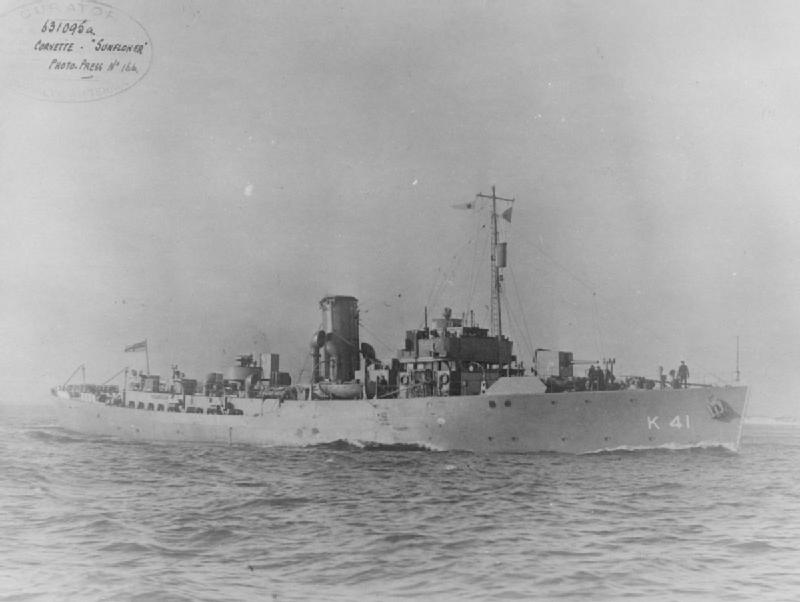

History

United Kingdom
- Name: HMS Sunflower
- Ordered: 31 August 1939
- Builder: Smith's Dock Co., Ltd. (South Bank-on-Tees, U.K.)
- Laid down: 24 May 1940
- Launched: 19 August 1940
- Commissioned: 25 January 1941
- Identification: Pennant number: K41
- Fate: Scrapped in September 1947 at Hayle.
- Badge

General characteristics
- Class & type: Flower-class corvette
- Displacement: 925 long tons (940 t)
- Length: 205 ft (62 m) o/a
- Beam: 33 ft (10 m)
- Draught: 11 ft 6 in (3.51 m)
- Installed power: 30 ft 4 in (9.25 m)
- Propulsion: 1 × 4-cycle triple-expansion reciprocating engine; 2 × Scotch fire-tube boilers; 1 × screw
- Speed: 16 kn (18 mph; 30 km/h)
- Range: 3,500 nmi (4,000 mi; 6,500 km) at 12 kn (14 mph; 22 km/h)
- Complement: 85
- Sensors & processing systems: 1 × SW1C or 2C radar; 1 × Type 123A or Type 127DV sonar
- Armament: 1 × BL 4 in (100 mm) Mk.IX gun; 4 × Vickers .50 cal machine gun (2×2); 4 × Lewis .303 cal machine gun (2×2); 2 × Mk.II depth charge throwers; 2 × Depth charge rails with 40 depth charges

Service record
- Operations: Battle of the Atlantic; Normandy 1944; English Channel 1944-45

HMS Sunflower was a Flower-class corvette of the Royal Navy. She served during the Second World War.

She was built at Smith's Dock Company, South Bank on Tees and launched on 19 August 1940. She was sold on 17 May 1947 and scrapped at Hayle, Cornwall, in September 1947.

HMS Sunflower was the most successful of the Royal Navy Flower-class. She single-handedly sank two U-boats: U-638 on 5 May 1943 and U-631 on 17 October 1943. She shared sinking of U-282 on 29 October 1943.

== Officers and crew ==
The task faced by the Captain, Lt. Cdr. John Treasure Jones, RNR, with his new crew was the same for all corvettes which were manned mainly by volunteers. Jones wrote:

"Around 90% of my crew had not been to sea before. They had been called-up, done a little training in barracks and then sent to man the ships. They were strengthened and knit together by a small number of trained ratings and naval pensioners. I had three officers plus an Engin-room Artificer, who was in charge of the engine and boiler rooms, with a Stoker Petty Officer to assist him. Of my three officers, only one had been to sea as an officer and he had just joined the Royal Naval Reserve prior to the war. My Second Officer was little older; his only sea experience was that he had served six months on the lower deck in one of the battleships, then been sent to an officers training college for 3 months; this was his first ship as an officer. My Third Officer was a young man of 19. He had joined-up straight from school, done six months on the lower deck as a rating, followed by 3 months at an officers training college before being appointed to my ship. I was daddy to these men was well as Captain, since I was 35 at the time."

"We sailed from Middlesbrough in January 1940 for Tobermory, to work-up before being sent to join a group on ocean escort of convoys. To start with I had difficulty in finding three men who could steer the ship, and as we had encountered bad weather as soon as we had put to sea, most of them were seasick."

After a few weeks working-up the ship and the crew, Admiral Stephenson would then personally inspect each escort and put the Captain and crew through a stiff test before releasing them for operational service.

== Service history ==
=== Battle of the Atlantic ===
During work-up Sunflower was deployed as escort for the submarine HMS Thunderbolt and the large Free French submarine Surcouf during passage to the Firth of Clyde.

In 1941 Western Approaches Command had formed eight escort groups. The 1st Escort Group consisted of six destroyers and four Flower-class corvettes. They were soon in action with other groups between 19 July – 1 August 1941 with Convoy ON 69 defending 26 merchant ships from 8 U-boats and 2 Italian submarines.

In February and March 1942 the original eight escort groups were reorganized into the Mid-Ocean Escort Force (MOEF).

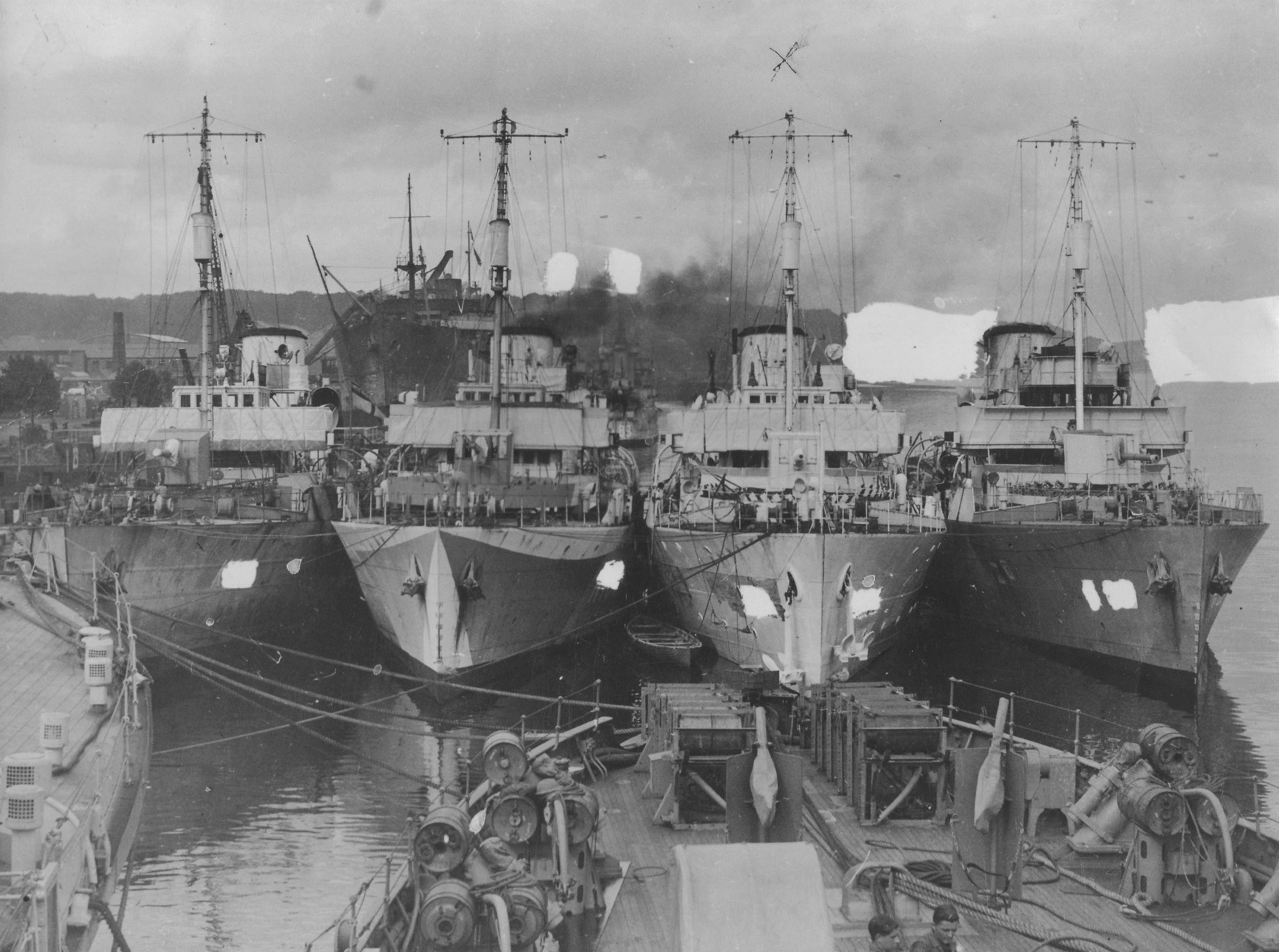
Corvettes of B7 Group moored in Londonderry. Alisma, Dianella, Sunflower & Kingcup. The white areas are where the official censor has painted out security sensitive material

Sunflower was part of Escort Group B7, one of seven such British naval groups which served with the Mid-Ocean Escort Force. It provided convoy protection in the most dangerous midsection of the North Atlantic route. B7's first convoys, in the spring of 1942, were uneventful, and as the pace of the Battle of the Atlantic hotted up in the summer and autumn, the group's charges were escorted without loss. But in December, while escorting ON 153, the convoy came under attack, and three ships were sunk. During this action, on 11 December, Firedrake was torpedoed by the U-boat U-211 and sank with the loss of 168 of her crew, including her current commander, and the group's Senior Officer – Escort (SOE), Commander Eric Tilden. Initially, 35 survived the torpedoing, but only 27 managed to get on board Sunflower, which was under the command of Lieut- Commander John Treasure Jones.

B7 was involved in the battles for convoys ONS 20 and ON 206, ON 207 and ON 208, during which period nine U-boats were destroyed.

In February 1943 the command passed to A/Lt.Cdr. James Plomer, RCNVR and during the following nine months they would have a series of notable successes.

Convoy ONS 5, comprising 46 merchant ships, departed Liverpool on 21 April 1943. In early May, they were under sustained submarine attacks. On 5 May U-638 was sunk by Sunflower. The convoy arrived in Halifax, Nova Scotia on 12 May. This was a major convoy battle which saw the destruction of six U-boats for the loss of thirteen ships.

Convoy ON 206, comprising 68 merchant ships, departed Liverpool on 11 October 1943. It arrived in New York on 27 October 1943 without loss. On 17 October U-631 was sunk in the North Atlantic, South-east of Cape Farewell, Greenland, by depth charges from Sunflower.

On 29 October 1943 U-282, which had been shadowing Convoy ON 208, was sunk by Hedgehog attacks carried out together with HMS Duncan and HMS Vidette.

=== Normandy 1944 ===
In May 1944 Sunflower was nominated for service in Force L for the Normandy Landings, code name Operation Neptune. She was assigned as part of Escort Group 154 with HM Corvettes Sweetbriar K209 and Oxlip K123. They were employed in convoy defence during the build-up operations in the English Channel and then retained in the Channel for convoy defence after termination of Neptune.

=== English Channel 1944–45 ===
On 30 August Sunflower was deployed for Channel convoy defence based at Sheerness. By the beginning of October merchant convoys were being detached from joined ocean convoys in Southwestern Approaches and routed through the English Channel for passage to and from London because the air threat from bases in France had been removed by the military advance to Germany. In February 1945 she resumed Channel convoy defence. German submarines and E-Boats were active in Channel area for mine and attacks by snorkel fitted U-boats were being made on assembly points for convoys and coastal traffic in Home waters.

In May 1945 she was paid off, de-stored and reduced to 'Reserve' status.

== Fate ==
HMS Sunflower remained in 'Reserve' at Harwich until placed on the 'Disposal List' in 1947. The ship was sold for demolition by Thos. W. Ward at Hayle, Cornwall later that year and arrived at the breaker's yard in August 1947.

== Sources ==
- Elliott, Peter (1977). Allied Escort Ships of World War II. Macdonald and Jane's. ISBN 0-356-08401-9.
- Treasure Jones, John (2008). Tramp to Queen. History Press Limited. ISBN 978-0-7524-4625-7.
