= German submarine U-364 =

German World War II submarine

History

Nazi Germany
- Name: U-364
- Ordered: 20 January 1941
- Builder: Flensburger Schiffbau-Gesellschaft, Flensburg
- Yard number: 483
- Laid down: 12 February 1942
- Launched: 21 January 1943
- Commissioned: 3 May 1943
- Fate: Sunk on 29 January 1944

General characteristics
- Class & type: Type VIIC submarine
- Displacement: 769 tonnes (757 long tons) surfaced; 871 t (857 long tons) submerged
- Length: 67.10 m (220 ft 2 in) o/a; 50.50 m (165 ft 8 in) pressure hull
- Beam: 6.20 m (20 ft 4 in) o/a; 4.70 m (15 ft 5 in) pressure hull
- Height: 9.60 m (31 ft 6 in)
- Draught: 4.74 m (15 ft 7 in)
- Installed power: 2,800–3,200 PS (2,100–2,400 kW; 2,800–3,200 bhp) (diesels); 750 PS (550 kW; 740 shp) (electric)
- Propulsion: 2 shafts; 2 × diesel engines; 2 × electric motors
- Speed: 17.7 knots (32.8 km/h; 20.4 mph) surfaced; 7.6 knots (14.1 km/h; 8.7 mph) submerged
- Range: 8,500 nmi (15,700 km; 9,800 mi) at 10 knots (19 km/h; 12 mph) surfaced; 80 nmi (150 km; 92 mi) at 4 knots (7.4 km/h; 4.6 mph) submerged
- Test depth: 230 m (750 ft); Crush depth: 250–295 m (820–968 ft)
- Complement: 4 officers, 40–56 enlisted
- Armament: 5 × torpedo tubes (four bow, one stern); 14 × 53.3 cm (21 in) torpedoes; 1 × 8.8 cm (3.46 in) deck gun (220 rounds); 2 × twin 2 cm (0.79 in) C/30 anti-aircraft guns

Service record
- Part of: 5th U-boat Flotilla; 3 May – 31 October 1943; 7th U-boat Flotilla; 1 November 1943 – 29 January 1944
- Identification codes: M 33 940
- Commanders: Oblt.z.S. Paul-Heinrich Sass; 3 May 1943 – 29 January 1944
- Operations: 2 patrols: 1st patrol: 23 – 26 November 1943; 2nd patrol: 28 November 1943 – 29 January 1944
- Victories: None

German submarine U-364 was a Type VIIC U-boat of Nazi Germany's Kriegsmarine during World War II.

She carried out two patrols. She did not sink or damage any ships.

She was a member of five wolfpacks.

She was sunk by a British aircraft in the Bay of Biscay on 29 January 1944.

== Design ==
German Type VIIC submarines were preceded by the shorter Type VIIB submarines. U-364 had a displacement of 769 tonnes (757 long tons) when at the surface and 871 tonnes (857 long tons) while submerged. She had a total length of 67.10 m (220 ft 2 in), a pressure hull length of 50.50 m (165 ft 8 in), a beam of 6.20 m (20 ft 4 in), a height of 9.60 m (31 ft 6 in), and a draught of 4.74 m (15 ft 7 in). The submarine was powered by two Germaniawerft F46 four-stroke, six-cylinder supercharged diesel engines producing a total of 2,800 to 3,200 metric horsepower (2,060 to 2,350 kW; 2,760 to 3,160 shp) for use while surfaced, two AEG GU 460/8–27 double-acting electric motors producing a total of 750 metric horsepower (550 kW; 740 shp) for use while submerged. She had two shafts and two 1.23 m (4 ft) propellers. The boat was capable of operating at depths of up to 230 metres (750 ft).

The submarine had a maximum surface speed of 17.7 knots (32.8 km/h; 20.4 mph) and a maximum submerged speed of 7.6 knots (14.1 km/h; 8.7 mph). When submerged, the boat could operate for 80 nautical miles (150 km; 92 mi) at 4 knots (7.4 km/h; 4.6 mph); when surfaced, she could travel 8,500 nautical miles (15,700 km; 9,800 mi) at 10 knots (19 km/h; 12 mph). U-364 was fitted with five 53.3 cm (21 in) torpedo tubes (four fitted at the bow and one at the stern), fourteen torpedoes, one 8.8 cm (3.46 in) SK C/35 naval gun, 220 rounds, and two twin 2 cm (0.79 in) C/30 anti-aircraft guns. The boat had a complement of between forty-four and sixty.

== Service history ==
The submarine was laid down on 12 February 1942 at the Flensburger Schiffsbau-Gesellschaft yard at Flensburg as yard number 483, launched on 21 January 1943 and commissioned on 3 May under the command of Oberleutnant zur See Paul-Heinrich Sass.

She served with the 5th U-boat Flotilla from 3 May 1943 and the 7th flotilla from 1 November.

=== First patrol ===
U-364's first patrol took her from Kiel in Germany to Marviken.

=== Second patrol and loss ===
Her second foray was from Marviken on 28 November 1943, through the gap between Iceland and the Faroe Islands and into the North Atlantic Ocean. On 29 January 1944, she was sunk by depth charges dropped by a British Handley Page Halifax of No. 502 Squadron RAF in the Bay of Biscay.

49 men died in the U-boat; there were no survivors.

=== Previously recorded fate ===
U-364 was originally noted as missing, also in the Bay of Biscay from 31 January 1944. No explanation has ever been offered.

In addition, she was reported as sunk on 30 January 1944 by a British Vickers Wellington of 172 Squadron in the Bay of Biscay. This attack caused no damage to U-608. The aircraft was shot down.

=== Wolfpacks ===
U-364 took part in five wolfpacks, namely:

- Coronel 1 (14 – 17 December 1943)
- Sylt (18 – 23 December 1943)
- Rügen 1 (23 – 28 December 1943)
- Rügen 2 (28 December 1943 – 7 January 1944)
- Rügen (7 – 14 January 1944)

== Bibliography ==
- Busch, Rainer; Röll, Hans-Joachim (1999). German U-boat commanders of World War II : a biographical dictionary. Translated by Brooks, Geoffrey. London, Annapolis, Md: Greenhill Books, Naval Institute Press. ISBN 1-55750-186-6.
- Busch, Rainer; Röll, Hans-Joachim (1999). Deutsche U-Boot-Verluste von September 1939 bis Mai 1945 [German U-boat losses from September 1939 to May 1945]. Der U-Boot-Krieg (in German). Vol. IV. Hamburg, Berlin, Bonn: Mittler. ISBN 3-8132-0514-2.
- Gröner, Erich; Jung, Dieter; Maass, Martin (1991). U-boats and Mine Warfare Vessels. German Warships 1815–1945. Vol. 2. Translated by Thomas, Keith; Magowan, Rachel. London: Conway Maritime Press. ISBN 0-85177-593-4.
