= HMS Vidette (D48) =

Destroyer of the Royal Navy

- HMS Vidette

History

United Kingdom
- Name: HMS Vidette
- Builder: Alexander Stephens & Sons Limited
- Laid down: 1 February 1917
- Launched: 28 February 1918
- Completed: 27 April 1918
- Fate: Sold for scrapping, 1947

General characteristics
- Class & type: Admiralty V-class destroyer

Service record
- Part of: 16th Destroyer Flotilla; 13th Destroyer Flotilla; Mid-Ocean Escort Force group B7
- Operations: World War II; Attack on Mers-el-Kébir; Battle of the Atlantic
- Victories: U-531; U-274; U-282; U-413; U-630

HMS Vidette (D48) was an Admiralty V-class destroyer of the Royal Navy. Built at the end of the First World War, she served in the final months of that conflict, and saw extensive service in the inter war years and in World War II. She was an effective convoy escort and U-boat killer, being credited with the destruction of five U-boats during the Battle of the Atlantic. HMS Vidette transported Spike Island Republican Prisoners to Bere Island Internment Camp in 1921. *Refer Spike Island’s Republican Prisoners, 1921 by Tom O’Neill MA.

== Construction ==
Vidette was ordered under the 1916–17 War Emergency Programme from Alexander Stephens & Sons Limited in Linthouse, Govan. She was laid down on 1 February 1917, was launched on 28 February 1918, and completed on 27 April the same year.

Vidette served with the Grand Fleet to the end of World War I, and was placed in Reserve in 1923. She spent most of the 1920s and 1930s in reserve, but was brought back to active service in 1939 for World War II. In the picture, taken probably in 1939, she is wearing the funnel bands of the 16th Destroyer Flotilla based at Portsmouth; one red over one white. Early in the war she would have landed the after set of torpedo tubes and shipped a QF 12 pounder 12 cwt gun in lieu.

Vidette received several refits and modifications during her service career. In 1923 she was equipped with submarine detection gear (ASDIC), one of the first British warships so outfitted. In 1939 she was refitted for convoy escort and anti-submarine warfare duty. In October 1941 during a refit at Gibraltar she received Type 286M radar. In September 1942 she was converted to a Long-Range Escort, landing her torpedo equipment and receiving additional anti-submarine weapons. She also had boilers removed and replaced with fuel tanks, reducing her overall speed but enhancing her range and endurance.

== Service history ==
At the outbreak of war in September 1939 Vidette was assigned to Gibraltar, as part of the 13th Destroyer Flotilla. She served there for the first three years, where she carried out convoy escort and general fleet duties.

In July 1940, after the fall of France, Vidette was with Force H during Operation Catapult, the neutralization of the French Fleet. On 3 July she was part of the screen for British ships shelling the French squadron at Mers-el-Kebir. Three days later she returned with Force H for Operation Lever, the sinking of the battleship Dunkerque. In early November she took part in Operation Collar, running aircraft reinforcements to the Malta garrison, and on 27 November took part in the battle of Spartivento.

In January 1941 she sailed with convoy WS 5A as far as Freetown, where she joined the West Africa station local escort. In October she returned to Gibraltar and refitted; later that month she was detailed to assist HG 75, working to save HMS Cossack, which had been torpedoed. The crew were saved, but the ship foundered under tow back to Gibraltar.

In May 1942 she returned to Gibraltar for Operation Bowery, and later Operation LB, both air reinforcement missions ("Club Runs") for Malta. In June she took part in Operation Harpoon, an ill-fated convoy mission to Malta. In September she returned to Britain for conversion as a Long-Range Escort, after which she joined the Western Approaches Command for operations in the North Atlantic.

After conversion Vidette was assigned to B-7 Escort Group, led by Cdr. Peter Gretton. After several uneventful crossings Vidette and B-7 EG were involved in several crucial battles. March 1943 saw fighting around convoys HX 231 with the loss of six ships sunk and three U-boats destroyed. In late April ONS 5 saw thirteen ships sunk and six U-boats destroyed; Vidette was credited with one (i.e. U-125; later revised to two, U-630 and U-531) of these: In late May SC 130 saw at least three U-boats destroyed for no losses.

During the autumn of 1943 B-7 served as a Support Group reinforcing several convoys as they came under attack. During this period Vidette took part in the destruction of two more U-boats, U-274 and U-282.

In May 1944 Vidette was operating in the English Channel as part of Operation Neptune, the naval component of the Normandy landings. In August she took part in the destruction of U-413.

With the end of hostilities in Europe Vidette was paid off in June 1945; she was sold for scrapping in April 1947.

== Battle honours ==
During her service Vidette was awarded five battle honours:

- Atlantic 1940–44
- Spartivento 1940
- Malta convoys 1942
- Normandy 1944
- English Channel 1944

== Successes ==
During her service Vidette was credited with the destruction of five U-boats:

Date	U-boat	Type	Location	Notes
6 May 1943	U-630	VIIC	NE of Newfoundland; 52°31′N 44°50′W	depth-charged by Vidette
6 May 1943	U-531 (previously credited as U-125)	IX/C40	NE of Newfoundland; 52°48′N 45°18′W	d/c by Snowflake, Vidette,
23 October 1943	U-274	VIIC	SW of Iceland; 57°14′N 27°50′W	d/c by Lib Z/224 Sqdn, Duncan, Vidette
29 October 1943	U-282	VIIC	S of Greenland; 55°28′N 31°57′W	d/c by Vidette, Sunflower
20 August 1944	U-413	VIIC	English Channel; 50°21′N 00°01′W	d/c by Vidette, Forester, Wensleydale
