= John Treasure Jones =

British naval officer (1905–1993)

Captain John Treasure Jones RD
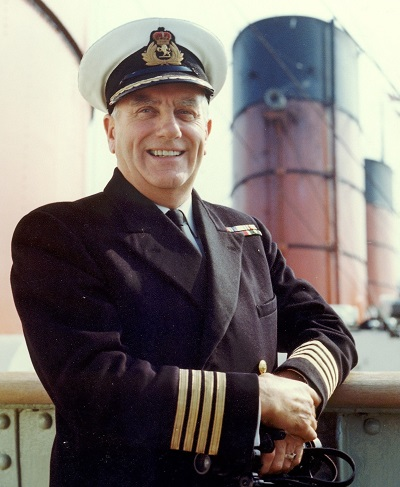
- Queen Mary 1966
- Born: 15 August 1905; Haverfordwest, Pembrokeshire
- Died: 12 May 1993 (aged 87); Chandlers Ford, Hampshire
- Military career
- Allegiance: United Kingdom
- Branch: Merchant Navy; Royal Navy; Royal Naval Reserve
- Service years: 1921–1968 (46½ years)
- Rank: Captain
- Units: Royal Naval Reserve; Cunard-White Star Line
- Commands: as listed
- Conflicts: World War II • Battle of the Atlantic • Battle of the Mediterranean
- Awards: as listed

Captain John Treasure Jones RD (15 August 1905 – 12 May 1993) was a British Merchant Navy officer who became a well-known media figure in the mid-1960s following his appointment as the last master of the Cunard liner, RMS Queen Mary. He has been described as one of the 20th century's most distinguished mariners, in war and in peacetime. His forebears were men of the sea, who had captained sailing ships, and he elected to follow in their tradition. (Note: His maternal grandfather Capt. Henry Williams, b.1840 had captained a sailing ship and three of his maternal uncles, Jack, James & Henry, were master mariners.)

== Family background ==
John Treasure Jones was born on 18 August 1905, at Cuckoo Mill Farm at Pelcomb Cross, outside Haverfordwest, Pembrokeshire. His father, Shrewsbury Treasure Jones, was a hay & corn merchant and ran the small 45 acre farm as a side line. (Note: There was a tradition of maintaining a record of the branches in the family tree by giving the sons the surnames of these previous generations as an additional Christian name. So the sons of Shrewsbury Treasure Jones (b.1872) were: Hugh Treasure Jones, John Treasure Jones (b.1905), Robert Whittow Jones (b.1907) and Henry Devereaux Jones (b.1909). Since these names were not part of the surname, they were not written with a hyphen.)

In 1917 he gained a scholarship to Haverfordwest Grammar School, but did not complete his formal education as the possibility of employment on a ship came along, just a week before taking his final examinations.

== Early years at sea ==
In 1921, not yet 16, Jones signed on for a four-year apprenticeship with J. C. Gould Steamship Co. Ltd. of Cardiff. (Note: A small company with 12 ships – went bankrupt in May 1925.) He first joined SS Grelgrant, a 4,785-ton tramp ship, and later transferred to SS Grelhead. Outward-bound they delivered coal from the South Wales coalfields to bunkering stations around the world and returned with cargoes of grain.

Having completed his apprenticeship as a bosun, he regularly attended nautical school in Cardiff in order to progress through the grades of his nautical qualifications. Jones joined the Royal Naval Reserve (RNR) as a probationary midshipman in 1923. On completion of his apprenticeship in 1925, aged 20, he completed six months training as a midshipman in HMS Hood, followed by HMS Velox and HMS Ajax.

Jones then joined Hall Bros of Newcastle in 1926, serving at first, as third mate, on the tramp ship SS Ambassador and then, as second mate, on SS Caduceus.

In August 1929, at 24, he was promoted to lieutenant RNR.

In August 1929 he joined the White Star Line on his first liner, SS Euripides, taking emigrants out to Australia and then on SS Delphic. The Great Depression set in and shipping fell on bad days. In November 1930 the company sent him to do twelve months reserve training in the Royal Navy, after which he was laid off.

In 1930–31 Jones served six months afloat in the aircraft carrier HMS Glorious and four months in the destroyer HMS Viscount on the Mediterranean station. (Note: He was serving as a Lieutenant RNR aboard HMS Glorious at the time of the collision with SS Florida.)

In November 1932 Jones managed to obtain employment as an assistant superintendent stevedore with Rea's Ltd, working with the Leyland Line ships at the Canada and Huskisson Docks in Liverpool. The Leyland Line was sold to T. & J. Harrison Ltd. and Jones soon left the company.

In July 1934 he returned to sea with the Blue Funnel Line, in SS Machaon and then SS Rhexenor.

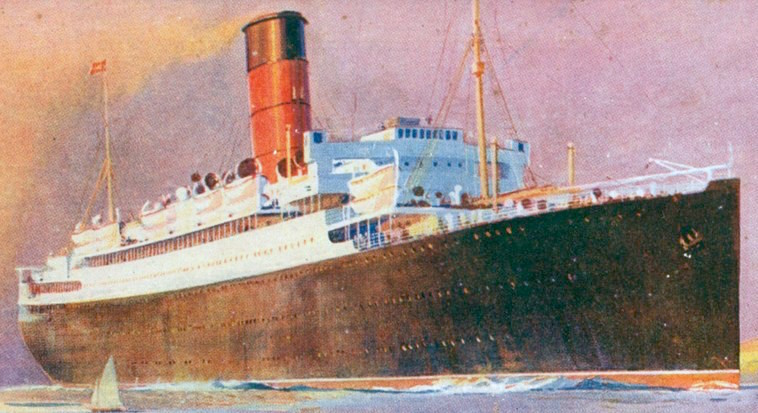
RMS Lancastria

In 1937 he joined the Cunard White Star Line as a junior third officer on his second liner, the 16,243-ton liner RMS Lancastria serving under Captain Bisset. By the time the war had started he was senior third officer in the 26,943-ton MV Britannic. (Note: RMS :Royal Mail Ship) (Note: MV Britannic and her twin sister MV Georgic were advanced Motor Vessels using diesel propulsion rather than the conventional SS/Steam Ships using multiple expansion steam engines.)

In August 1937 he was promoted to lieutenant commander RNR.

== War service ==
Jones as a Commander RNR RD, 1943

From September 1939 he served as the Navigating Officer on the armed merchant cruiser Laurentic (formerly SS Laurentic of the Cunard White Star Line). Initially their task was to patrol the waters between Iceland and the Faroe Islands to prevent German supply shipping getting in and out of the North Sea. Later they were re-deployed into the Denmark Strait between Greenland and Iceland. On 4 November 1940, when returning to Liverpool from a patrol between Portugal and the Azores, Laurentic was torpedoed and sunk, 300 miles west of the Bloody Foreland in Ireland, with the loss of 49 lives. The 367 survivors were adrift for about six hours.

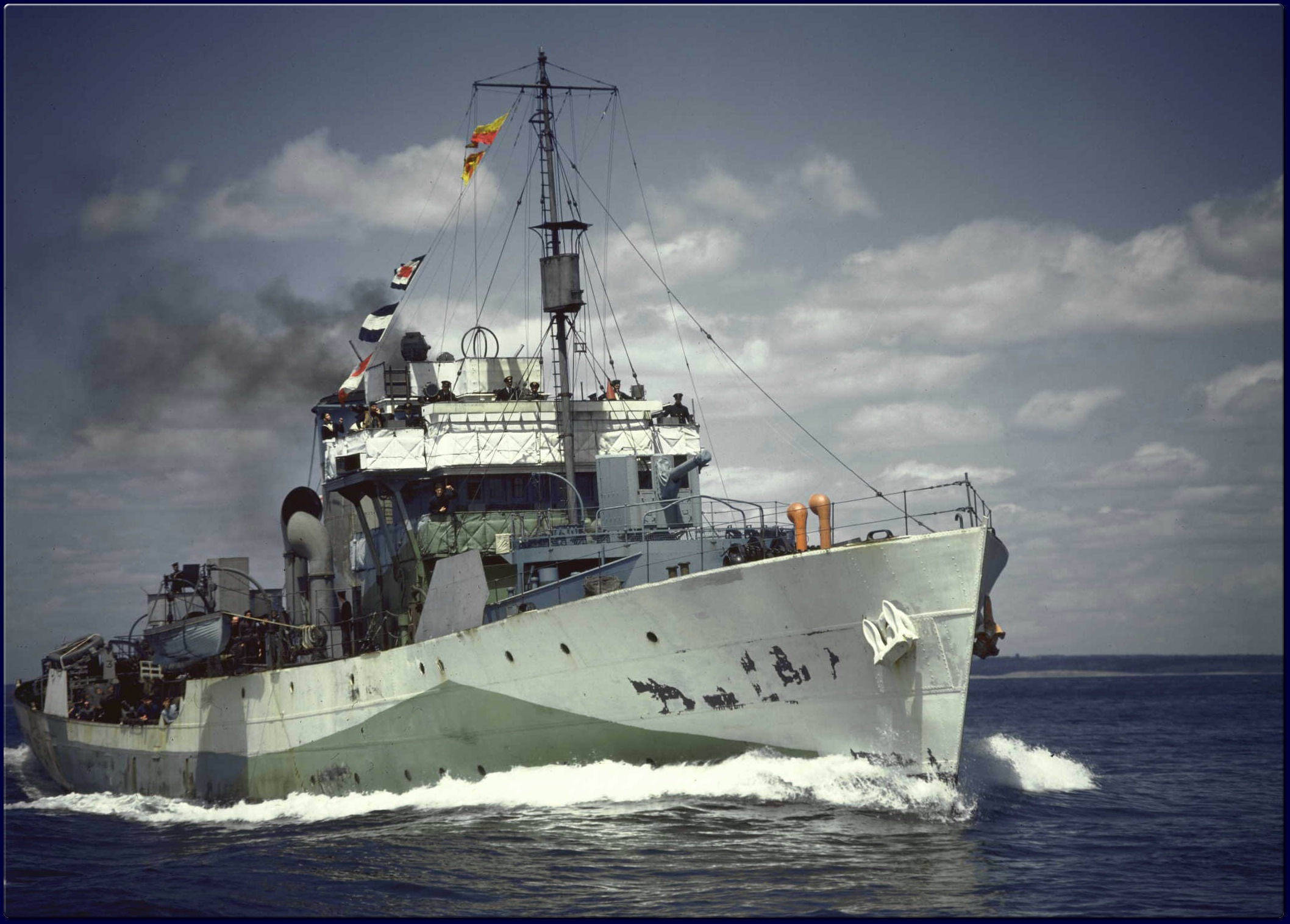
Flower-class corvette

The following month he was appointed to the command of HMS Sunflower, a new Flower-class corvette that was being completed at Smith's Yard in Middlesbrough. Ninety percent of the crew had not been to sea before, but were strengthened and knit together by a small number of trained ratings and naval pensioners. Once trained, they joined B1 Group in Derry which was employed escorting Atlantic convoys. On 17 December 1942, while escorting Convoy ON 153, HMS Firedrake, the escort group commander's ship, was torpedoed by the U-211 and sunk. HMS Sunflower picked up 27 survivors in 60-foot (18 m)-high waves, for which Jones was Mentioned in Dispatches, and took over command of the convoy escort.

In 1943 Jones was promoted Commander RNR and commanded HMS Wellington and then HMS Bayntun (one of the first Captain-class frigates built in Boston, Massachusetts for the Admiralty), before taking over the River-class frigate HMS Dart on 30 August, and command of 49th Escort Group in the Mediterranean Sea. (Note: He later became a member of the Honourable Company of Master Mariners, which, after the war, acquired Wellington its headquarters.) (Note: HMS Dart was commissioned on 15 May 1943.)

In June 1945 Jones was promoted Acting-Captain RNR and posted to South East Asia Command under Admiral Mountbatten. He was appointed as divisional sea transport officer of the Netherlands East Indies, based in Java, Batavia. The war in Asia had ended in August 1945 with the Japanese capitulation but they were still required to deal with the return transport of troops and supplies, as well as the shipping of the civilian and military prisoners of war out of the Japanese camps.

Jones was demobbed in March 1947 but remained in the Naval Reserve.

He was promoted to captain RNR on 31 December 1949 and retired from the service in 1960. (Note: Jones served 37 years as an RNR officer, on 13 ships with 7¼ sea years and a further 3¼ years ashore.)

== Post-war service ==
Blue Ensign of a Captain RNR

Jones rejoined the Cunard Line in March 1947 as a senior first officer, serving in RMS Samaria, RMS Scythia, RMS Britannic, RMS Georgic and RMS Queen Elizabeth. (Note: Post-war he started using 'Treasure Jones' as his surname.) In February 1954 he was appointed staff captain RMS Caronia, until he was given his first command of cargo/passenger liner RMS Media in May 1957, followed by the 22,017-ton liner RMS Sylvania, then the 22,592-ton RMS Saxonia in 1959 to the early 1960s.

From December 1962 he commanded RMS Mauretania. Whilst his previous commands had been solely on the North Atlantic, Mauretania was used for cruises. Even so, she was facing competition from much more modern ships and was beginning to lose money for Cunard Line.

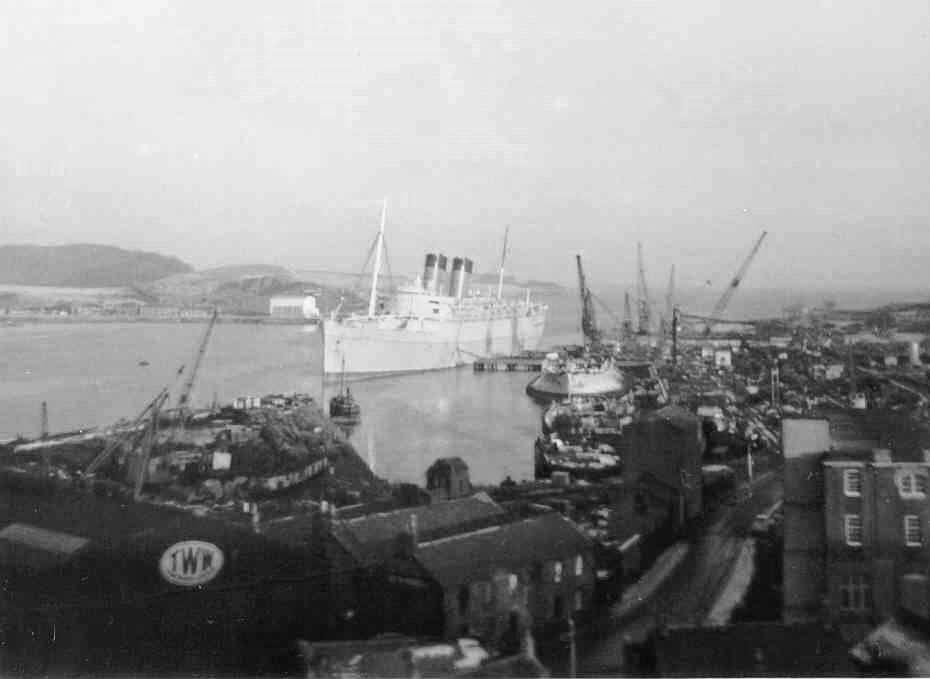
Mauretania at Inverkeithing

In 1964 Texaco completed a new oil refinery in Milford Haven, Pembrokeshire, just 10 miles from where John Treasure Jones was born. Texaco chartered Mauretania to take the guests from Southampton to Milford Haven and back. The opening ceremony was performed by Queen Elizabeth the Queen Mother, who travelled down on the royal train. Afterwards, the captain hosted lunch on board for the Queen Mother and the other guests. In the autumn of 1965 it was announced that Mauretania would be withdrawn from service and sold to Ward's ship breaking yard in Inverkeithing, Fife in Scotland. On the night of 22/23 November he navigated the mud straits of the River Forth without tugs, and made the final berthing through the shallows above the mud banks on the midnight high tide.

He briefly commanded RMS Queen Elizabeth and then RMS Queen Mary from September 1965. In August 1966, under his command, she made the fastest eastbound passage since August 1938 in 4 days, 10 hours and 6 minutes, averaging 29.46 knots (54.56 km/h).

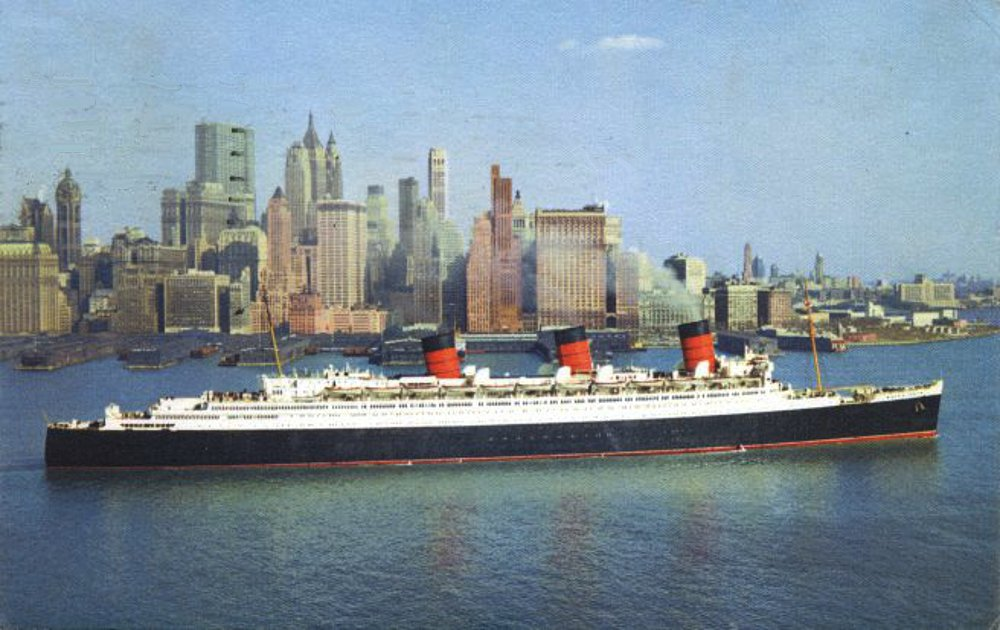
RMS Queen Mary at New York

On 27 September 1967, Queen Mary arrived back in Southampton having completed her 1,000th and last crossing of the North Atlantic, having carried 2,112,000 passengers over 3,792,227 miles (6,102,998 km). On 31 October she sailed from Southampton for the last time with 1,093 passengers and 806 crew. For the first time in his long career, this was Treasure Jones's only voyage around Cape Horn. She arrived in Long Beach, California, on 9 December 1967 and the captain lowered both the Cunard house flag and his own Blue Ensign when he conducted the sale to the City of Long Beach on 11 December 1967. (Note: British merchant vessels commanded by an officer of the Royal Naval Reserve in possession of a Government warrant are entitled to fly a Blue Ensign, rather that the standard Red Ensign.)

Treasure Jones retired in August 1968, aged 63, after a career of 47 years, of which he served almost 43½ continuous years at sea. He died of an aneurysm on 12 May 1993 at Chandler's Ford, near Southampton aged 87.

== Family and personal life ==
At school he had been in the first elevens for football and cricket. He was also a competent boxer.

In August 1933 Jones married Eulalie Isobelle (Belle) Lees in Haverfordwest and they had three sons and a daughter.

After retiring from the sea he regularly played cricket for the Master Mariners up until the age of 83. In later years he also took up golf and regularly took his clubs along with him on board ship. Once he retired he continued playing regularly as a member of Stoneham Golf Club, Southampton.

== Recognition ==
His decorations and medals were:

- 1939–45 Star
- Atlantic Star
- Africa Star with Bar for North Africa 1942–43
- 1939–45 War Medal with oak leaf for Mention in Dispatches (twice)
- Coronation Medal
- Reserve Decoration with Bar.

In 1968 the University of Wales conferred on him an Honorary Doctorate in Law.

In 1978 was granted the Freedom of Haverfordwest, his home town.

On the final voyage of Queen Mary in 1967 he was awarded:

- Honorary Member of the Panama Canal Pilots Association
- Honorary Pilot of the Port of Long Beach
- First Honorary Port Ambassador of the Port of Long Beach

== Commands ==
Ships commanded by Capt. John Treasure Jones
Name	Description	from	to
HMS Sunflower (K41)	Corvette	18 December 1940	19 February 1943
HMS Wellington (U65)	Sloop	4 March 1943	18 June 1943
HMS Baynton (K310)	Frigate	19 June 1943	29 August 1943
HMS Dart (K21)	Frigate	30 August 1943	31 May 1945
SS Vandalia (Note: Built 1945 as SS Samaritan, a lend-lease cargo ship, purchased in 1947 by Cunard from MOWT and Vandalia.)	7,273 tons	27 June 1953? (Note: Dates are uncertain. Within the Cunard Line the normal career steps were: Chief Officer of a liner - Master of a cargo ship - Staff Captain of a liner.)	9 September 1953?
RMS Media	13,345 tons	24 May 1957	11 July 1959
RMS Sylvania	22,017 tons	20 February 1959	14 March 1959
RMS Saxonia	22,592 tons	26 August 1959	29 September 1962
RMS Carinthia	21,947 tons	24 October 1962	12 November 1962
RMS Mauretania	35,793 tons	4 December 1962	23 June 1965
RMS Mauretania	final voyage	15 September 1965	23 November 1965
RMS Queen Elizabeth	83,673 tons	7 July 1965	20 July 1965
RMS Queen Mary	81,235 tons	8 September 1965	11 December 1967

- Sources: Directorate of Personnel Support (Navy), Archive Services and Summary of 'Continuous Certificate of Discharge' Books for Jones, R21261

== BBC TV Archives ==
- BBC WALES: MASTER AT SEA - 50 minute documentary filmed as sea aboard Mauretania. Date: June 1964.
- BBC WALES NEWS ARCHIVE CUT STORIES. Programme number: PEN9130K. Date: 10/11/1965. Catalogue number: 10476050.
- QUEEN MARY ARRIVES SOUTHAMPTON. Programme number: ANB6082R. Date: 11/04/1967. Catalogue number: 472694.
- BBC WALES NEWS ITEMS. Programme number: PEN9154T. Date: 10/05/1967. Catalogue number: 10542213.
- QUEEN MARY LINER LEAVES NEW YORK FOR SOUTHAMPTON. Programme number: ANB6246F. Date: 22/09/1967. Catalogue number: 473791.
- QUEEN MARY LINER FINAL VOYAGE. Programme number: ANB6246F. Date: 22/09/1967. Catalogue number: 473784.
- STORY OF THE QUEEN MARY. Programme number: LDC5951H. Date: 26/09/1967. Catalogue number: 9420702.
- QUEEN MARY: LAST VOYAGE ENDS AT SOUTHAMPTON. Programme number: ANB6251B. Date: 27/09/1967. Catalogue number: 473735.
- QUEEN MARY LINER FINAL HOMECOMING TO SOUTHAMPTON. Programme number: ANB6251B. Date: 27/09/1967. Catalogue number: 473725.
- TUESDAY DOCUMENTARY: SHIPS OF STATE. Programme number: LGF6506K. Date: 09/09/1975. Catalogue number: 1174602.
- THE GREAT LINERS: 3. Programme number: NBSA750N. Date: 29/10/1979. Catalogue number: 1160034.
- BBC SOUTH TODAY. Programme number: B:RSRW042L. Date: 17/10/1983. Catalogue number: 11950.
- THE VISIT: THE GOLDEN VOYAGE. Programme number: NGWJ001K. Date: 26/11/1986. Catalogue number: 124891.
- BBC SOUTH TODAY. Programme number: D:RSRW750A. Date: 14/12/1988. Catalogue number: 269219.
- BBC SOUTH TODAY. Programme number: E:RSRW243J. Date: 26/09/1991. Catalogue number: 366162.
