= HMS Jonquil (K68) =

British Royal Navy corvette

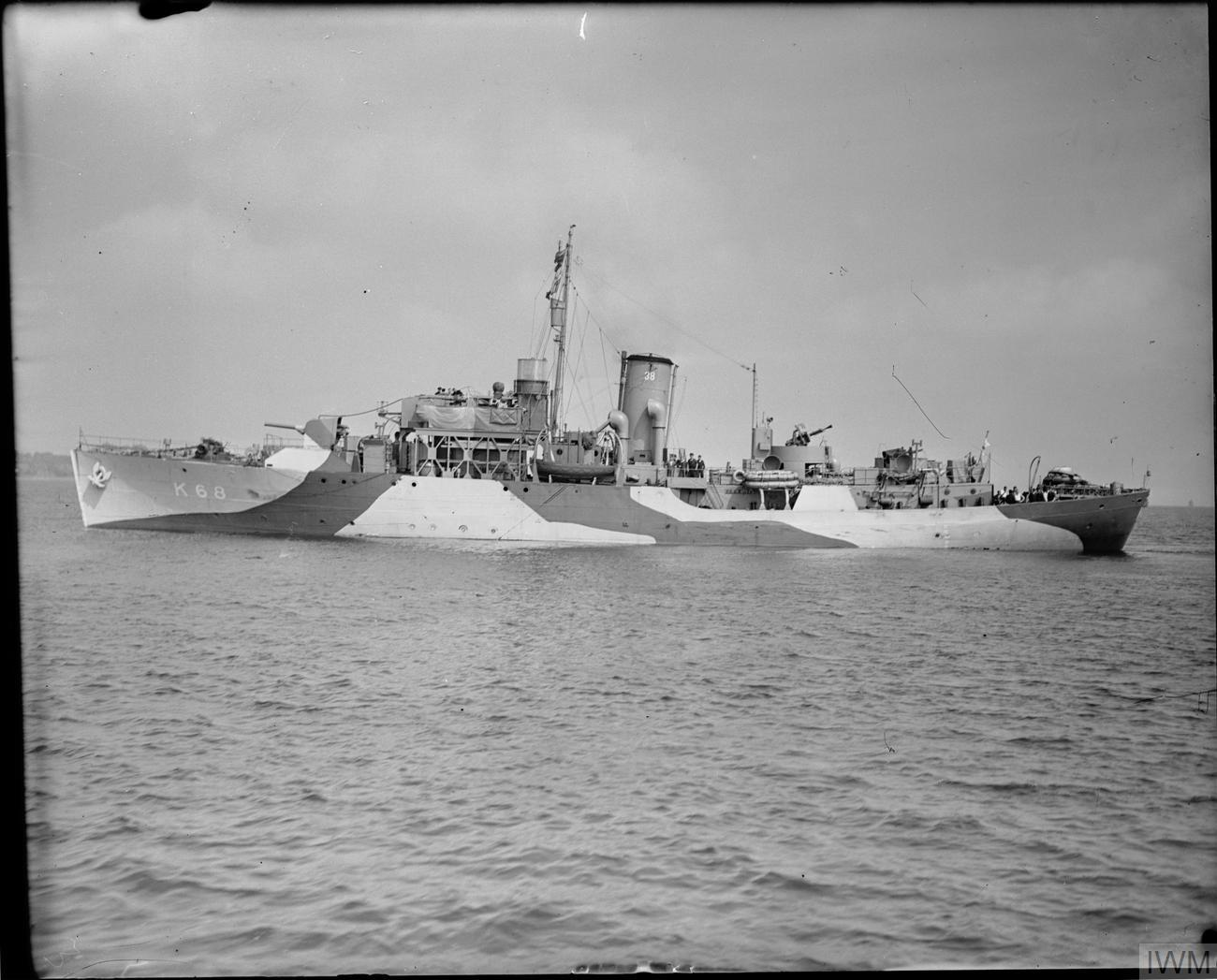
- Underway in 1944

History

United Kingdom
- Name: HMS Jonquil
- Ordered: 31 August 1939
- Builder: Fleming and Ferguson
- Laid down: 27 December 1939
- Launched: 9 July 1940
- Commissioned: 20 October 1940
- Decommissioned: August 1945
- Identification: Pennant number: K68
- Fate: Sold to Greece, renamed Lemnos

Greece
- Name: Lemnos
- Renamed: Olympic Rider (1951)
- Fate: Sank in 1955 after a collision

General characteristics
- Class & type: Flower-class corvette
- Displacement: 925 long tons (940 t)
- Length: 205 ft (62 m) o/a
- Beam: 33 ft (10 m)
- Draught: 11 ft 6 in (3.51 m)
- Propulsion: 1 × 4-cycle triple-expansion reciprocating steam engine; 2 × fire tube Scotch boilers; Single shaft; 2,750 ihp (2,050 kW)
- Speed: 16 kn (30 km/h)
- Range: 3,500 nmi (6,500 km) at 12 kn (22 km/h)
- Complement: 85
- Sensors & processing systems: 1 × SW1C or 2C radar; 1 × Type 123A or Type 127DV sonar
- Armament: 1 × BL 4-inch (101.6 mm) Mk.IX gun; 2 × Vickers .50 cal machine gun (twin); 2 × Lewis .303 cal machine gun (twin); 2 × Mk.II Depth charge throwers; 2 × Depth charge rails with 40 depth charges

HMS Jonquil was a Flower-class corvette of the British Royal Navy. The corvette, named after the flower genus Jonquil, served in the Second World War.

Laid down by the company Fleming and Ferguson on 27 December 1939 and launched on 9 July 1940, Jonquil entered service on 20 October and assumed convoy responsibilities the following month. Her first deployment was as an escort for Convoy WS.5A, bound for the West African port of Freetown.

Jonquil survived the war but was relegated to the reserve at Gibraltar from August 1945. Bought by Greece, the corvette was renamed Lemnos and converted into a merchant vessel. Redesignated Olympic Rider in 1951, Jonquil sank after a collision with Olympic Cruiser in the Antarctic in 1955.
