= German submarine U-531 =

German World War II submarine

Coordinates: 52°48′N 45°18′W

History

Nazi Germany
- Name: U-531
- Ordered: 15 August 1940
- Builder: Deutsche Werft AG, Hamburg
- Yard number: 346
- Laid down: 22 December 1941
- Launched: 12 August 1942
- Commissioned: 28 October 1942
- Fate: Sunk on 6 May 1943 in the North Atlantic.

General characteristics
- Class & type: Type IXC/40 submarine
- Displacement: 1,144 t (1,126 long tons) surfaced; 1,257 t (1,237 long tons) submerged
- Length: 76.76 m (251 ft 10 in) o/a; 58.75 m (192 ft 9 in) pressure hull
- Beam: 6.86 m (22 ft 6 in) o/a; 4.44 m (14 ft 7 in) pressure hull
- Height: 9.60 m (31 ft 6 in)
- Draught: 4.67 m (15 ft 4 in)
- Installed power: 4,400 PS (3,200 kW; 4,300 bhp) (diesels); 1,000 PS (740 kW; 990 shp) (electric)
- Propulsion: 2 shafts; 2 × diesel engines; 2 × electric motors
- Speed: 18.3 knots (33.9 km/h; 21.1 mph) surfaced; 7.3 knots (13.5 km/h; 8.4 mph) submerged
- Range: 13,850 nmi (25,650 km; 15,940 mi) at 10 knots (19 km/h; 12 mph) surfaced; 63 nmi (117 km; 72 mi) at 4 knots (7.4 km/h; 4.6 mph) submerged
- Test depth: 230 m (750 ft)
- Complement: 4 officers, 44 enlisted
- Armament: 6 × torpedo tubes (4 bow, 2 stern); 22 × 53.3 cm (21 in) torpedoes; 1 × 10.5 cm (4.1 in) SK C/32 deck gun (180 rounds); 1 × 3.7 cm (1.5 in) SK C/30 AA gun; 1 × twin 2 cm FlaK 30 AA guns

Service record
- Part of: 4th U-boat Flotilla; 28 October 1942 – 31 March 1943; 2nd U-boat Flotilla; 1 April – 6 May 1943
- Identification codes: M 49 566
- Commanders: Oblt.z.S. / Kptlt. Herbert Neckel; 28 October 1942 – 6 May 1943
- Operations: 1 patrol: 13 April – 6 May 1943
- Victories: None

German submarine U-531 was a Type IXC/40 U-boat of Nazi Germany's Kriegsmarine built for service during World War II. She was laid down at Deutsche Werft in Hamburg as yard number 346 on 22 December 1941, launched on 12 August 1942 and commissioned on 28 October with Oberleutnant zur See Herbert Neckel in command.

Her service began with training as part of the 4th U-boat Flotilla; she then joined the 2nd flotilla for operations on 1 April 1943, before being sunk on 6 May 1943.

== Design ==
German Type IXC/40 submarines were slightly larger than the original Type IXCs. U-531 had a displacement of 1,144 tonnes (1,126 long tons) when at the surface and 1,257 tonnes (1,237 long tons) while submerged. The U-boat had a total length of 76.76 m (251 ft 10 in), a pressure hull length of 58.75 m (192 ft 9 in), a beam of 6.86 m (22 ft 6 in), a height of 9.60 m (31 ft 6 in), and a draught of 4.67 m (15 ft 4 in). The submarine was powered by two MAN M 9 V 40/46 supercharged four-stroke, nine-cylinder diesel engines producing a total of 4,400 metric horsepower (3,240 kW; 4,340 shp) for use while surfaced, two Siemens-Schuckert 2 GU 345/34 double-acting electric motors producing a total of 1,000 shaft horsepower (1,010 PS; 750 kW) for use while submerged. She had two shafts and two 1.92 m (6 ft) propellers. The boat was capable of operating at depths of up to 230 metres (750 ft).

The submarine had a maximum surface speed of 18.3 knots (33.9 km/h; 21.1 mph) and a maximum submerged speed of 7.3 knots (13.5 km/h; 8.4 mph). When submerged, the boat could operate for 63 nautical miles (117 km; 72 mi) at 4 knots (7.4 km/h; 4.6 mph); when surfaced, she could travel 13,850 nautical miles (25,650 km; 15,940 mi) at 10 knots (19 km/h; 12 mph). U-531 was fitted with six 53.3 cm (21 in) torpedo tubes (four fitted at the bow and two at the stern), 22 torpedoes, one 10.5 cm (4.13 in) SK C/32 naval gun, 180 rounds, and a 3.7 cm (1.5 in) SK C/30 as well as a 2 cm (0.79 in) C/30 anti-aircraft gun. The boat had a complement of forty-eight.

== Service history ==
U-531's operational career commenced with her departure from Kiel on 13 April 1943. Heading for the Atlantic, her route took her between Iceland and the Faeroe Islands. On 22 April, in the afternoon, she was attacked southeast of Iceland by a Catalina flying boat of 120 Squadron RAF. That evening, she was attacked again, this time by a British Flying Fortress of 206 Squadron.

On 6 May, the boat was attacked northeast of Newfoundland by depth charges from HMS Vidette and sunk with all hands (54). Among the lost was Hans Georg Keitel. Son of field marshal Wilhelm Keitel.

== Previously recorded fate ==
The destruction of U-531 had been attributed to the destroyer HMS Oribi and the Flower-class corvette HMS Snowflake.

=== Wolfpacks ===
U-531 took part in three wolfpacks, namely:

- Meise (25 – 27 April 1943)
- Star (27 April – 4 May 1943)
- Fink (4 – 6 May 1943)

== Bibliography ==
- Busch, Rainer; Röll, Hans-Joachim (1999). German U-boat commanders of World War II : a biographical dictionary. Translated by Brooks, Geoffrey. London, Annapolis, Md: Greenhill Books, Naval Institute Press. ISBN 1-55750-186-6.
- Busch, Rainer; Röll, Hans-Joachim (1999). Deutsche U-Boot-Verluste von September 1939 bis Mai 1945 [German U-boat losses from September 1939 to May 1945]. Der U-Boot-Krieg (in German). Vol. IV. Hamburg, Berlin, Bonn: Mittler. ISBN 3-8132-0514-2.
- Edwards, Bernard (1996). Dönitz and the Wolf Packs - The U-boats at War. Cassell Military Classics. p. 199. ISBN 0-304-35203-9.
- Gröner, Erich; Jung, Dieter; Maass, Martin (1991). U-boats and Mine Warfare Vessels. German Warships 1815–1945. Vol. 2. Translated by Thomas, Keith; Magowan, Rachel. London: Conway Maritime Press. ISBN 0-85177-593-4.
- Kemp, Paul (1997). U-Boats Destroyed - German Submarine Losses in the World Wars. Arms & Armour. ISBN 1-85409-515-3.
