= German submarine U-274 =

German World War II submarine

Coordinates: 57°14′N 27°50′W

History

Nazi Germany
- Name: U-274
- Ordered: 10 April 1941
- Builder: Bremer Vulkan, Bremen-Vegesack
- Yard number: 39
- Laid down: 9 January 1942
- Launched: 19 September 1942
- Commissioned: 7 November 1942
- Fate: Sunk on 23 October 1943

General characteristics
- Class & type: Type VIIC submarine
- Displacement: 769 tonnes (757 long tons) surfaced; 871 t (857 long tons) submerged
- Length: 67.10 m (220 ft 2 in) o/a; 50.50 m (165 ft 8 in) pressure hull
- Beam: 6.20 m (20 ft 4 in) o/a; 4.70 m (15 ft 5 in) pressure hull
- Height: 9.60 m (31 ft 6 in)
- Draught: 4.74 m (15 ft 7 in)
- Installed power: 2,800–3,200 PS (2,100–2,400 kW; 2,800–3,200 bhp) (diesels); 750 PS (550 kW; 740 shp) (electric)
- Propulsion: 2 shafts; 2 × diesel engines; 2 × electric motors
- Speed: 17.7 knots (32.8 km/h; 20.4 mph) surfaced; 7.6 knots (14.1 km/h; 8.7 mph) submerged
- Range: 8,500 nmi (15,700 km; 9,800 mi) at 10 knots (19 km/h; 12 mph) surfaced; 80 nmi (150 km; 92 mi) at 4 knots (7.4 km/h; 4.6 mph) submerged
- Test depth: 230 m (750 ft); Crush depth: 250–295 m (820–968 ft)
- Complement: 4 officers, 40–56 enlisted
- Armament: 5 × 53.3 cm (21 in) torpedo tubes (four bow, one stern); 14 × torpedoes or 26 TMA mines; 1 × 8.8 cm (3.46 in) deck gun (220 rounds); 1 × twin 2 cm (0.79 in) C/30 anti-aircraft gun

Service record
- Part of: 8th U-boat Flotilla; 7 November 1942 – 31 July 1943; 7th U-boat Flotilla; 1 August – 23 October 1943
- Identification codes: M 49 305
- Commanders: Oblt.z.S. Günther Jordan; 7 November 1942 – 23 October 1943
- Operations: 2 patrols: 1st patrol: 1 – 13 September 1943; 2nd patrol: 13 – 23 October 1943
- Victories: None

German submarine U-274 was a Type VIIC U-boat of Nazi Germany's Kriegsmarine during World War II.

The submarine was laid down on 9 January 1942 at the Bremer Vulkan yard at Bremen-Vegesack as yard number 39. She was launched on 19 September 1942 and commissioned on 7 November under the command of Oberleutnant zur See Günther Jordan.

== Design ==
German Type VIIC submarines were preceded by the shorter Type VIIB submarines. U-274 had a displacement of 769 tonnes (757 long tons) when at the surface and 871 tonnes (857 long tons) while submerged. She had a total length of 67.10 m (220 ft 2 in), a pressure hull length of 50.50 m (165 ft 8 in), a beam of 6.20 m (20 ft 4 in), a height of 9.60 m (31 ft 6 in), and a draught of 4.74 m (15 ft 7 in). The submarine was powered by two Germaniawerft F46 four-stroke, six-cylinder supercharged diesel engines producing a total of 2,800 to 3,200 metric horsepower (2,060 to 2,350 kW; 2,760 to 3,160 shp) for use while surfaced, two AEG GU 460/8–27 double-acting electric motors producing a total of 750 metric horsepower (550 kW; 740 shp) for use while submerged. She had two shafts and two 1.23 m (4 ft) propellers. The boat was capable of operating at depths of up to 230 metres (750 ft).

The submarine had a maximum surface speed of 17.7 knots (32.8 km/h; 20.4 mph) and a maximum submerged speed of 7.6 knots (14.1 km/h; 8.7 mph). When submerged, the boat could operate for 80 nautical miles (150 km; 92 mi) at 4 knots (7.4 km/h; 4.6 mph); when surfaced, she could travel 8,500 nautical miles (15,700 km; 9,800 mi) at 10 knots (19 km/h; 12 mph). U-274 was fitted with five 53.3 cm (21 in) torpedo tubes (four fitted at the bow and one at the stern), fourteen torpedoes, one 8.8 cm (3.46 in) SK C/35 naval gun, 220 rounds, and one twin 2 cm (0.79 in) C/30 anti-aircraft gun. The boat had a complement of between forty-four and sixty.

== Service history ==
U-274 served with the 8th U-boat Flotilla for training from November 1942 to July 1943 and operationally with the 7th U-boat Flotilla from 1 August 1943. She carried out two patrols, but sank no ships.

She carried out short voyages between Kiel in Germany and Bergen and Trondheim in Norway over August 1943.

=== First patrol ===
The boat departed Trondheim on 1 September 1943 and returned to the Norwegian port twelve days later on the 13th.

=== Second patrol and loss ===
For her second sortie, the boat headed toward the Atlantic Ocean, via the gap between Iceland and the Faroe Islands. She was sunk by Hedgehog and depth charges dropped by the British destroyers HMS Duncan and HMS Vidette and a B-24 Liberator of No. 224 Squadron RAF on 23 October 1943.

The pilot of the Liberator was a Swiss national serving in the RAF. The intercom in the aircraft had been inadvertently left connected to the radio. As a result, ships of the nearby convoy escort heard an improvised commentary which was a great encouragement.

== Bibliography ==
- Busch, Rainer; Röll, Hans-Joachim (1999). German U-boat commanders of World War II : a biographical dictionary. Translated by Brooks, Geoffrey. London, Annapolis, Md: Greenhill Books, Naval Institute Press. ISBN 1-55750-186-6.
- Busch, Rainer; Röll, Hans-Joachim (1999). Der U-Boot-Krieg, 1939-1945: Deutsche U-Boot-Verluste von September 1939 bis Mai 1945 [German U-boat losses from September 1939 to May 1945] (in German). Vol. IV. Hamburg, Berlin, Bonn: Mittler. ISBN 3-8132-0514-2.
- Gröner, Erich; Jung, Dieter; Maass, Martin (1991). U-boats and Mine Warfare Vessels. German Warships 1815–1945. Vol. 2. Translated by Thomas, Keith; Magowan, Rachel. London: Conway Maritime Press. ISBN 0-85177-593-4.
- Kemp, Paul (1999). U-Boats Destroyed – German Submarine Losses in the World Wars. London: Arms & Armour. ISBN 1-85409-515-3.
