= German submarine U-638 =

German World War II submarine

History

Nazi Germany
- Name: U-638
- Ordered: 20 January 1941
- Builder: Blohm & Voss, Hamburg
- Yard number: 614
- Laid down: 16 October 1941
- Launched: 8 July 1942
- Commissioned: 3 September 1942
- Fate: Sunk on 5 May 1943

General characteristics
- Class & type: Type VIIC submarine
- Displacement: 769 tonnes (757 long tons) surfaced; 871 t (857 long tons) submerged
- Length: 67.10 m (220 ft 2 in) o/a; 50.50 m (165 ft 8 in) pressure hull
- Beam: 6.20 m (20 ft 4 in) o/a; 4.70 m (15 ft 5 in) pressure hull
- Draught: 4.74 m (15 ft 7 in)
- Installed power: 2,800–3,200 PS (2,100–2,400 kW; 2,800–3,200 bhp) (diesels); 750 PS (550 kW; 740 shp) (electric)
- Propulsion: 2 shafts; 2 × diesel engines; 2 × electric motors
- Speed: 17.7 knots (32.8 km/h; 20.4 mph) surfaced; 7.6 knots (14.1 km/h; 8.7 mph) submerged
- Range: 8,500 nmi (15,700 km; 9,800 mi) at 10 knots (19 km/h; 12 mph) surfaced; 80 nmi (150 km; 92 mi) at 4 knots (7.4 km/h; 4.6 mph) submerged
- Test depth: 230 m (750 ft); Crush depth: 250–295 m (820–968 ft)
- Complement: 4 officers, 40–56 enlisted
- Armament: 5 × 53.3 cm (21 in) torpedo tubes (four bow, one stern); 14 × torpedoes or 26 TMA mines; 1 × 8.8 cm (3.46 in) deck gun (220 rounds); 1 × twin 2 cm (0.79 in) C/30 anti-aircraft gun

Service record
- Part of: 5th U-boat Flotilla; 3 September 1942 – 31 January 1943; 9th U-boat Flotilla; 1 February – 5 May 1943
- Identification codes: M 51 249
- Commanders: Oblt.z.S. Oskar Staudinger; 3 September – 8 December 1942; Kptlt. Hinrich-Oscar Bernbeck; 9 December 1942 – 31 March 1943; Kptlt. Oskar Staudinger; 1 April – 5 May 1943
- Operations: 2 patrols: 1st patrol: 4 February – 31 March 1943; 2nd patrol: 20 April – 5 May 1943
- Victories: 1 merchant ship sunk (5,507 GRT); 1 merchant ship damaged (6,537 GRT)

German submarine U-638 was a Type VIIC U-boat built for Nazi Germany's Kriegsmarine for service during World War II. She was laid down on 16 October 1941 by Blohm & Voss, Hamburg as yard number 614, launched on 8 July 1942 and commissioned on 3 September 1942 under Kapitänleutnant Oskar Staudinger.

== Design ==
German Type VIIC submarines were preceded by the shorter Type VIIB submarines. U-638 had a displacement of 769 tonnes (757 long tons) when at the surface and 871 tonnes (857 long tons) while submerged. She had a total length of 67.10 m (220 ft 2 in), a pressure hull length of 50.50 m (165 ft 8 in), a beam of 6.20 m (20 ft 4 in), a height of 9.60 m (31 ft 6 in), and a draught of 4.74 m (15 ft 7 in). The submarine was powered by two Germaniawerft F46 four-stroke, six-cylinder supercharged diesel engines producing a total of 2,800 to 3,200 metric horsepower (2,060 to 2,350 kW; 2,760 to 3,160 shp) for use while surfaced, two BBC GG UB 720/8 double-acting electric motors producing a total of 750 metric horsepower (550 kW; 740 shp) for use while submerged. She had two shafts and two 1.23 m (4 ft) propellers. The boat was capable of operating at depths of up to 230 metres (750 ft).

The submarine had a maximum surface speed of 17.7 knots (32.8 km/h; 20.4 mph) and a maximum submerged speed of 7.6 knots (14.1 km/h; 8.7 mph). When submerged, the boat could operate for 80 nautical miles (150 km; 92 mi) at 4 knots (7.4 km/h; 4.6 mph); when surfaced, she could travel 8,500 nautical miles (15,700 km; 9,800 mi) at 10 knots (19 km/h; 12 mph). U-638 was fitted with five 53.3 cm (21 in) torpedo tubes (four fitted at the bow and one at the stern), fourteen torpedoes, one 8.8 cm (3.46 in) SK C/35 naval gun, 220 rounds, and one twin 2 cm (0.79 in) C/30 anti-aircraft gun. The boat had a complement of between forty-four and sixty.

== Service history ==
The boat's career began with training at 5th U-boat Flotilla on 3 September 1942, followed by active service on 1 February 1943 as part of the 9th Flotilla for the remainder of her service.

In two patrols she sank one merchant ship, for a total of 5,507 gross register tons (GRT) and one ship damaged.

=== Wolfpacks ===
U-638 took part in four wolfpacks, namely:

- Burggraf (26 – 28 February 1943)
- Wildfang (28 February – 5 March 1943)
- Raubgraf (7 – 15 March 1943)
- Amsel 1 (3 – 5 May 1943)

=== Fate ===
U-638 was sunk on 5 May 1943 in the North Atlantic in position 54°12′N 44°05′W, by depth charges from HMS Sunflower. She managed to send a final signal about the attack and the fact she was sinking. All hands were lost.

== Summary of raiding history ==
Date	Ship Name	Nationality	Tonnage (GRT)	Fate
7 March 1943	Empire Light	United Kingdom	6,537	Damaged
5 May 1943	Dollus	United Kingdom	5,507	Sunk

== Bibliography ==
- Busch, Rainer; Röll, Hans-Joachim (1999). German U-boat commanders of World War II : a biographical dictionary. Translated by Brooks, Geoffrey. London, Annapolis, Md: Greenhill Books, Naval Institute Press. ISBN 1-55750-186-6.
- Busch, Rainer; Röll, Hans-Joachim (1999). Der U-Boot-Krieg, 1939-1945: Deutsche U-Boot-Verluste von September 1939 bis Mai 1945 [German U-boat losses from September 1939 to May 1945] (in German). Vol. IV. Hamburg, Berlin, Bonn: Mittler. ISBN 3-8132-0514-2.
- Edwards, Bernard (1996). Dönitz and the Wolfpacks - The U-boats at War. Cassell. p. 199. ISBN 0-304-35203-9.
- Gröner, Eric; Jung, Dieter; Maass, Martin (1991). German Warships 1815-1945: U-boats and Mine Warfare Vessels. Vol. 2. Translated by Thomas, Keith; Magowan, Rachel. London: Conway Maritime Press. ISBN 0-85177-593-4.
- Sharpe, Peter (1998). U-Boat Fact File. Great Britain: Midland Publishing. ISBN 1-85780-072-9.
