= German submarine U-125 =

U-125 may refer to one of the following German submarines:

- SM U-125, a Type UE II submarine launched in 1918 and that served in World War I until surrendered on 26 November 1918; served as the Japanese submarine O-1, 1920–21; broken up at Sasebo Navy Yard between January and March 1921; rebuilt as testbed for submarine salvage work in 1925; recommissioned as Auxiliary Vessel No. 2900 in 1931; taken out of service in 1935
  - During World War I, Germany also had this submarine with a similar name:
    - SM UB-125, a Type UB III submarine launched in 1918 and surrendered on 20 November 1918; served as Japanese submarine O-6, 1920–21; broken up at Sasebo Navy Yard by June 1921; used as a floating jetty at Sasebo
- German submarine U-125 (1940), a Type IXC submarine that served in World War II until sunk on 6 May 1943
