= Convoy ONS 5 order of battle =

This is the order of battle during the battles around Convoy ONS 5 from 29 April to 6 May 1943.

== Allied orders of battle ==
=== Convoy ===
Convoyed ships
Name	Year	Flag	GRT	Notes
SS Agios Georgios	1911	Greece	4,248	
SS Argon	1920	United States	6,952	Escort Oiler
SS Baron Elgin	1933	Merchant Navy	3,942	
SS Baron Graham	1925	Merchant Navy	3,242	
SS Baron Semple	1939	Merchant Navy	4,573	
SS Bengkalis	1918	Netherlands	6,453	
SS Berkel	1930	Netherlands	2,130	After collision with Bornholm 25 April
SS Bonde	1936	Norway	1,570	Sunk by U-266
SS Bornholm	1930	Merchant Navy	3,177	Collision With Berkel, detached to Iceland
SS Bosworth	1919	Merchant Navy	6,672	Joined ex-Iceland 26 April
Bristol City	1920	Merchant Navy	2,864	Sunk by U-358
RFA British Lady	1923	Merchant Navy	6,098	Escort Oiler
SS Campus	1925	Merchant Navy	3,667	
SS Commandant Dorise	1917	Merchant Navy	5,529	
SS Cydonia	1927	Merchant Navy	3,517	
SS Director	1926	Merchant Navy	5,107	
Dolius	1924	Merchant Navy	5,507	Sunk by U-638
SS Dunsley	1929	Merchant Navy	3,862	
SS Empire Advocate	1913	Merchant Navy	5,787	Turned back with defects
SS Empire Gazelle	1920	Merchant Navy	4,848	
SS Empire Planet	1923	Merchant Navy	4,290	
SS Fana	1939	Norway	1,375	
Gharinda	1919	Merchant Navy	5,306	Sunk by U-266
SS Gudvor	1928	Norway	2,280	Joined ex-Iceland 26 April
Harbury	1933	Merchant Navy	5,081	Sunk by U-628
Harperley	1930	Merchant Navy	4,586	Sunk by U-264
SS Isobel	1929	Panama	1,515	Straggled, notional date
SS Ivan Topic	1920	Yugoslavia	4,943	
Lorient	1921	Merchant Navy	4,737	Straggled, sunk by U-125
SS Losada	1921	Merchant Navy	6,520	
SS Mano	1925	Merchant Navy	1,418	
McKeesport	1919	United States	6,198	Sunk by U-258
SS Merton	1941	Merchant Navy	7,150	
SS Modlin	1906	Poland	3,569	Returned, boiler defects
SS Nicolas	1910	Greece	4,540	
North Britain	1940	Merchant Navy	4,635	Straggled, sunk by U-707
SS Omega	1912	Merchant Navy	3,788	
SS Ottinge	1940	Merchant Navy	2,870	
SS Penhale	1924	Merchant Navy	4,071	Straggled and arrived Reykjavik
SS Rena	1924	Norway	5,242	
SS Sapelo	1919	United States	5,422	Joined ex-Iceland 26 April
Selvistan	1924	Merchant Navy	5,136	Sunk by U-266
USS Tarazed (AF-13)	1931	United States	6,963	Joined ex-Iceland 26 April
SS Temple Arch	1940	Merchant Navy	5,138	
Wentworth	1919	Merchant Navy	5,212	Sunk by U-358 Loosestrife
SS West Madaket	1918	United States	5,565	Sunk by U-584
SS West Maximus	1919	United States	5,561	Sunk by U-264
SS Yearby	1929	Merchant Navy	5,666	

=== Escorts ===
Convoy escorts (in relays)
Name	Flag	Type	Notes
HMCS Barrie	Royal Canadian Navy	Flower-class corvette	Escort 7–12 May
HMCS Buctouche	Royal Canadian Navy	Flower-class corvette	Escort 7–12 May
HMCS Cowichan	Royal Canadian Navy	Bangor-class minesweeper	Escort 7–12 May
HMS Duncan	Royal Navy	D-class destroyer	Escort 22 April – 3 May, Flag Escort Group B7
HMS Impulsive	Royal Navy	I-class destroyer	Escort 2–3 May, Escort Group EG3
HMS Jed	Royal Navy	River-class frigate	Escort 6–8 May, Support Group EG 1
HMS Loosestrife	Royal Navy	Flower-class corvette	Escort 22 April – 3 May, Escort Group B7
HMS Offa	Royal Navy	O-class destroyer	Escort 2–6 May, Support Group EG 3
HMS Oribi	Royal Navy	O-class destroyer	Escort 29 April – 6 May, Support Group EG 3
HMS Panther	Royal Navy	P-class destroyer	Escort 2–3 May, Support Group EG 3
HMS Pelican	Royal Navy	Egret-class sloop	Escort 6–8 May, Support Group EG 1
HMS Penn	Royal Navy	P-class destroyer	Escort 2–3 May, Support Group EG 3
HMS Pink	Royal Navy	Flower-class corvette	Escort 22 April – 3 May, Escort Group B7
HMS Sennen	Royal Navy	Banff-class sloop	Escort 6–8 May, Support Group EG 1
HMS Snowflake	Royal Navy	Flower-class corvette	Escort 22 April – 7 May, Escort Group B7
HMS Spey	Royal Navy	River-class frigate	Escort 6–8 May, Support Group EG 1
HMS Sunflower	Royal Navy	Flower-class corvette	Escort 22 Apr – 3 May, Escort Group B7
HMS Tay	Royal Navy	River-class frigate	Escort 22 April– 7 May, Escort Group B7
HMS Vidette	Royal Navy	V-class destroyer	Escort 26 April – 3 May, Escort Group B7
HMS Wear	Royal Navy	River-class frigate	Escort 6 –8 May, Support Group EG 1

== Axis order of battle ==
U-boat	Type	Patrol	Sailed from	Gruppe Specht	Gruppe Amsel	Gruppe Star	Gruppe Amsel I	Gruppe Amsel II	Gruppe Fink	Notes
U-107	IXB	9th	Lorient 24 April				3 May			attacked by convoy escort 6 May; returned to Lorient 26 May
U-125	IXC	7th	Lorient 13 April	19 April					4 May	torpedoed one ship 4 May; sunk by convoy escort 6 May
U-168	IXC40	1st	Kiel 9 March	19 April					4 May	Shadowed convoy 5 May; returned to Lorient 18 May
U-192	IXC40	1st	Kiel 13 April			27 April			4 May	Sunk by convoy escort 6 May
U-209	VIIC	7th	Kiel 6 April			27 April			4 May	Damaged by bomber 18:00 4 May; sank about 7 May
U-223	VIIC	2nd	Saint-Nazaire 15 April		22 April			3 May		Damaged by convoy escort 5 May; returned Saint-Nazaire 24 May
U-226	VIIC	2nd	Lorient 10 April	19 April					4 May	Lightly damaged by convoy escort; returned to Saint-Nazaire 17 May
U-231	VIIC	1st	Kiel 13 April			27 April			4 May	Attacked by convoy escort 5 May; returned to La Pallice 31 May
U-258	VIIC	4th	La Pallice 1 April			27 April			4 May	Torpedoed one ship 07:30 29 April; sunk by bomber 20 May
U-260	VIIC	3rd	Saint-Nazaire 12 March	19 April					4 May	Attacked by convoy escort 5 May; returned to Saint-Nazaire 22 May
U-264	VIIC	3rd	Saint-Nazaire 8 April	19 April					4 May	Torpedoed three ships on 5 May; returned to Lorient 1 June
U-266	VIIC	2nd	Saint-Nazaire 14 April		22 April			3 May		Torpedoed three ships and lightly damaged by convoy escort 5 May; sunk by bomber 15 May
U-267	VIIC	2nd	Saint-Nazaire 23 March							Damaged by convoy escort; returned to Saint-Nazaire 21 May
U-270	VIIC	1st	Kiel 23 March	19 April					4 May	Damaged by convoy escort 5 May; returned to Saint-Nazaire 15 May
U-358	VIIC	2nd	Saint-Nazaire 11 April	19 April					4 May	Torpedoed two ships on 5 May, damaged by convoy escort; returned Saint-Nazaire 15 May
U-377	VIIC	9th	Brest 15 April		22 April			3 May		Returned to Brest 7 June
U-378	VIIC	7th	Trondheim 12 April			27 April			4 May	Shadowed convoy 28 April and 5 May; returned to La Pallice 4 June
U-381	VIIC	3rd	Saint-Nazaire 31 March			27 April			4 May	Shadowed convoy 30 April; sunk 21 May
U-383	VIIC	3rd	Brest 17 April		22 April			3 May		Returned to Brest 25 May
U-386	VIIC	1st	Kiel 15 April			27 April				Damaged by convoy escorts 28/29 April; returned to Saint-Nazaire 11 May
U-402	VIIC	7th	La Pallice 22 April				3 May			Returned to La Pallice 26 May
U-413	VIIC	3rd	Brest 30 March			27 April			4 May	Damaged by convoy escort 5 May; returned to Brest 13 June
U-438	VIIC	4th	Brest 31 March	19 April					4 May	Damaged by bomber 2045 4 May; sunk by Support Group 1 on 6 May
U-504	IXC	6th	Lorient 21 April				3 May			returned to Bordeaux 29 May
U-514	IXC	3rd	Lorient 15 April	19 April					4 May	Damaged by convoy escort 5 May; returned to Lorient 22 May
U-528	IXC40	1st	Kiel 15 April			27 April				Damaged by convoy escorts 28/29 April; sunk by bomber 11 May
U-531	IXC40	1st	Kiel 13 April			27 April			4 May	Sunk by convoy escort 5 May
U-532	IXC40	1st	Kiel 25 March			27 April				Damaged by convoy escorts 29 April; returned to Lorient 15 May
U-533	IXC40	1st	Kiel 15 April			27 April			4 May	Damaged by convoy escort 6 May; returned Lorient 24 May
U-552	VIIC	12th	Saint-Nazaire 4 April			27 April			4 May	Returned to Saint-Nazaire 13 June
U-575	VIIC	8th	Saint-Nazaire 22 April				3 May			Damaged by convoy escort 5 May; returned to Saint-Nazaire 11 June
U-584	VIIC	9th	Brest 23 March	19 April					4 May	Torpedoed one ship 5 May; returned to Brest 24 May
U-614	VIIC	2nd	Saint-Nazaire 12 April	19 April					4 May	Returned to Saint-Nazaire 24 May
U-621	VIIC	4th	Brest 22 April				3 May			Attacked by convoy escort 5 May; returned to Brest 3 June
U-628	VIIC	3rd	Brest 8 April	19 April					4 May	Torpedoed two ships on 5 May; returned to Brest 19 May
U-630	VIIC	1st	Kiel 18 March	19 April					4 May	Sunk by convoy escort 6 May
U-634	VIIC	2nd	Lorient 15 April		22 April			3 May		Damaged by convoy escort 5 May; returned to Brest 23 May
U-638	VIIC	2nd	La Pallice 20 April				3 May			Torpedoed one ship and sunk by convoy escort 5 May
U-648	VIIC	1st	Kiel 3 April			27 April			4 May	Damaged by convoy escort 5 May; returned to Brest 19 May
U-650	VIIC	1st	Bergen 10 April			27 April			4 May	Found convoy 09:00 28 April; launched torpedoes 28 April; damaged by 1st Support Group 6 May; returned to Saint-Nazaire 28 June
U-662	VIIC	3rd	Saint-Nazaire 23 March	19 April					4 May	Attacked by convoy escort 5 May; returned to Saint-Nazaire 19 May
U-707	VIIC	2nd	Saint-Nazaire 12 April	19 April					4 May	Torpedoed one ship 5 May and damaged by convoy escort; returned to Bordeaux 31 May
U-710	VIIC	1st	Kiel 15 April							Sunk by bomber 17:30, 24 April
U-732	VIIC	1st	Kiel 8 April	19 April					4 May	Damaged by convoy escort 5 May; returned to Brest 15 May
U-952	VIIC	1st	Bergen 22 April							returned to Bordeaux 31 May
U-954	VIIC	1st	Kiel 8 April			27 April			4 May	Attacked by convoy escort 6 May;sunk 19 May while attacking convoy SC 130
