= List of shipwrecks in May 1943 =

The list of shipwrecks in May 1943 includes ships sunk, foundered, grounded, or otherwise lost during May 1943.

== 1 May ==
List of shipwrecks: 1 May 1943
Ship	State	Description
Adelfotis	Greece	World War II: The cargo ship (5,838 GRT) was torpedoed and sunk in the Atlantic Ocean (3°32′S 21°33′W) by U-182 (Kriegsmarine) with the loss of one of her 39 crew. Her captain was taken aboard U-182 as a prisoner of war.
British Trust	United Kingdom	World War II: Convoy MW 27: The tanker (8,466 GRT) was hit by a torpedo from a Heinkel He 111 of Kampfgeschwader 26 at approx. 20:00 hrs, her port side was opened for a third of her length and her cargo of oil caught fire. She listed heavily and sank within three minutes with the loss of 10 of her 69 crew, 30 nautical miles (56 km) north north west of Benghazi, Libya (32°40′N 19°53′E).
City of Singapore	United Kingdom	World War II: Convoy TS 37: The cargo ship (6,555 GRT, 1923) was torpedoed and sunk in the Atlantic Ocean 75 nautical miles (139 km) south west of Freetown, Sierra Leone (7°55′N 14°16′W) by U-515 (Kriegsmarine). All 97 crew were rescued by HMT Arran and HMT Birdlip (both Royal Navy). Her 97 crew survived.
Clan Macpherson	United Kingdom	World War II: Convoy TS 37: The cargo ship (6,940 GRT, 1929) was torpedoed and sunk in the Atlantic Ocean 75 nautical miles (139 km) south west of Freetown (7°58′N 14°14′W) by U-515 (Kriegsmarine) with the loss of four of her 140 crew. Survivors were rescued by HMT Arran (Royal Navy).
Crusader	United States	The 101-gross register ton, 73.4-foot (22.4 m) fishing vessel sank in the Shumagin Islands in the Territory of Alaska.
Erinpura	United Kingdom	World War II: Convoy MW 27: The troopship (5,128 GRT, 1911) was hit by a bomb in her forward hatch or deck by aircraft from Kampfgeschwader 26 at approximately 20:15 hrs 30 nautical miles (56 km) north north west of Benghazi (32°40′N 19°53′E), and sank within four minutes with the loss of 942 lives (114 crew, 5 gunners and 822 troops).
Keishin Maru	Imperial Japanese Navy	World War II: The Keishin Maru-class auxiliary gunboat was sunk in the Pacific Ocean about five nautical miles (9.3 km; 5.8 mi) from Shioyazaki, Fukushima prefecture, Japan (37°04′N 140°06′E) by USS Pogy (United States Navy) with the loss of one crewman.
Mokambo	Belgium	World War II: Convoy TS 37: The cargo ship was torpedoed and damaged in the Atlantic Ocean 75 nautical miles (139 km) south west of Freetown (7°58′N 14°14′W) by U-515 (Kriegsmarine). She was taken in tow by HMS Aimwell and HMS Oriana (both Royal Navy) but capsized and sank the next day at Freetown. All 57 crew survived.
Port Victor	United Kingdom	World War II: The refrigerated cargo liner (12,411 GRT, 1942) was torpedoed and sunk in the Atlantic Ocean (47°49′N 22°02′W) by U-107 (Kriegsmarine) with the loss of 19 of the 164 people aboard. Survivors were rescued by HMS Wren (Royal Navy).
Proletar	Yugoslav Partisans	World War II: The armed launch was captured by NAP-24 and MB-9 (Regia Marina), but she sank from battle damage before she could be towed to port.
ShCh-323	Soviet Navy	World War II: The Shchuka-class submarine was sunk by a mine in the Baltic Sea off Petershof (59°55′N 30°02′E) with the loss of 39 crew. There were 5 survivors. She was raised and scrapped in 1944.
V 1241 Stangenwalde	Kriegsmarine	World War II: The Vorpostenboot was sunk in the North Sea off Terschelling, Friesland, Netherlands in a battle with HMMGB 605, HMMGB 606, HMMGB 610, HMMGB 612, HMMTB 624, HMMTB 630 and HMMTB 632 (all Royal Navy). 7 or 8 crew were killed or missing, and four other died of their wounds in the following days.

== 2 May ==
List of shipwrecks: 2 May 1943
Ship	State	Description
USCGC CG-58012	United States Navy	The 58-foot patrol boat was sunk off the Mary Ann Rocks whistle buoy, Manomet, Massachusetts by an explosion in the engine room. All four crewmen survived.
Erna	Denmark	World War II: The coaster (5,838 GRT) struck a mine and sank in the Smaalandsfarvandet (55°02′N 11°36′E). One of her three crew was killed.
F 111 Sogliola	Italy	World War II: The auxiliary vessel was sunk by gunfire off Asinara Island, Italy by HMS Safari (Royal Navy). There were six dead and 29 survivors.
Gneisenau	Germany	World War II: The ocean liner struck a mine in the Baltic Sea (54°38′00″N 12°25′01″E). She capsized and sank. The wreck was raised on 12 July 1950 and scrapped in Denmark.
HMS MTB 311	Royal Navy	World War II: The Elco 77' motor torpedo boat (30/54 t, 1942) was sunk in the Mediterranean Sea by a mine off Bône, Algeria.
RD 12	Regia Marina	World War II: The RD-class minesweeper was sunk off Cape Bon, Tunisia by Allied aircraft. There were no casualties.
Tamon Maru	Imperial Japanese Navy	World War II: Convoy No. 257: The transport was torpedoed and sunk in the Pacific Ocean (27°18′N 121°38′E) by USS Stingray (United States Navy). Eighty-one crewmen were killed.
Turunmaa	Finnish Navy	World War II: The gunboat was seriously damaged in an air raid south of Kotka and had to be beached. Crew casualties were one dead and nine wounded. The ship was immediately refloated and was fully repaired by 23 October 1943.
U-465	Kriegsmarine	World War II: The Type VIIC submarine was depth charged and sunk in the Bay of Biscay north of Cape Finisterre, Spain (44°48′N 8°58′W) by a Short Sunderland aircraft of 461 Squadron, Royal Australian Air Force with the loss of all 48 crew.

== 3 May ==
List of shipwrecks: 3 May 1943
Ship	State	Description
Campobasso	Italy	World War II: The transport ship was shelled and sunk in the Mediterranean Sea off Kelibia, Tunisia by HMS Nubian, HMS Paladin and HMS Petard (all Royal Navy). There were 73 dead and 30 survivors.
USS LCT-23	United States Navy	World War II: The LCT Mk 5 was sunk at Algiers, Algeria by an underwater explosion.
Perseo	Regia Marina	World War II: The Spica-class torpedo boat was sunk east of Tunis, Tunisia by HMS Nubian, HMS Paladin, and HMS Petard (all Royal Navy). 133 crew and passengers were killed. There were 83 survivors.

== 4 May ==
List of shipwrecks: 4 May 1943
Ship	State	Description
Aegir	Germany	World War II: The cargo ship was sunk in the North Sea north of Juist by a mine laid by British aircraft.
Ilyich	Soviet Union	World War II: The Soviet schooner was sunk in the Black Sea when holed by a dud torpedo from S-102 (Kriegsmarine).
Lorient	United Kingdom	World War II: Convoy ONS 5: The cargo ship (4,737 GRT, 1921) straggled behind the convoy. She was torpedoed and sunk in the Atlantic Ocean south of Cape Farewell, Greenland (54°04′N 44°18′W) by U-125 (Kriegsmarine) with the loss of all 43 crew.
Noku Maru	Japan	World War II: The trawler was shelled and sunk in the Pacific Ocean by USS Gudgeon (United States Navy).
USAT Oneida	United States Army	World War II: The ship straggled behind her convoy and foundered in the Atlantic Ocean 70 nautical miles (130 km) north east of Cape Charles, Virginia (31°24′N 75°20′W). Thirty-one people were rescued by USS Andres (United States Navy) but 31 others were lost.
Panam	Panama	World War II: Convoy NK 538: The tanker straggled behind the convoy. She was torpedoed and sunk in the Atlantic Ocean off the coast of North Carolina, United States (at 34°11′N 76°12′W), by U-129 (Kriegsmarine) with the loss of two of her 51 crew. Survivors were rescued by USS SC-664 (United States Navy).
San Clemente Maru	Imperial Japanese Navy	World War II: The San Clemente Maru-class tanker was torpedoed and sunk in the Pacific Ocean 50 nautical miles (93 km) south east of Palau (06°50′N 134°28′E) by USS Seal (United States Navy). One crewman was killed. Survivors were rescued by Hoei Maru (Imperial Japanese Army).
Sizilien	Germany	World War II: The cargo ship was bombed and sunk off Terschelling, Friesland, Netherlands by Royal Air Force aircraft.
Spina Secondo	Italy	World War II: The sailing vessel was sunk by gunfire off Kos, Greece by HMS Parthian (Royal Navy). The three crew survived the sinking.
U-109	Kriegsmarine	World War II: The Type IXB submarine was depth charged and sunk in the Atlantic Ocean (47°22′N 22°40′W) by a Consolidated Liberator aircraft of 86 Squadron, Royal Air Force with the loss of all 52 crew.
U-439	Kriegsmarine	The Type VIIC submarine collided with U-659 (Kriegsmarine) and sank in the Atlantic Ocean west of Cape Ortegal, Spain (43°32′N 13°20′W) with the loss of nine of her 49 crew.
U-659	Kriegsmarine	The Type VIIC submarine collided with U-439 (Kriegsmarine) in the Atlantic Ocean west of Cape Ortegal (43°32′N 13°20′W) and sank with the loss of 44 of her 47 crew.

== 5 May ==
List of shipwrecks: 5 May 1943
Ship	State	Description
Bonde	Norway	World War II: Convoy ONS 5: The cargo ship (1,570 GRT, 1936) was torpedoed and sunk in the Atlantic Ocean (53°28′N 44°20′W) by U-266 (Kriegsmarine) with the loss of fourteen of her 26 crew. Survivors were rescued by HMS Tay (Royal Navy).
Bristol City	United Kingdom	World War II: Convoy ONS 5: The cargo ship (2,864 GRT, 1919) was torpedoed and sunk in the Atlantic Ocean south of Cape Farewell, Greenland (54°00′N 43°55′W) by U-358 (Kriegsmarine) with the loss of fifteen of her 49 crew. Survivors were rescued by HMS Loosestrife (Royal Navy).
Daifuku Maru	Japan	World War II: The cargo ship (3,194 GRT) was torpedoed and sunk in the Yellow Sea (38°37′N 122°38′E) by USS Snook (United States Navy). Five crew and 10 passengers were killed.
Dolius	United Kingdom	World War II: Convoy ONS 5: The cargo ship (5,507 GRT, 1924) was torpedoed and sunk in the Atlantic Ocean east of Belle Isle, Newfoundland (54°00′N 43°35′W) by U-638 (Kriegsmarine) with the loss of four of her 70 crew. Survivors were rescued by HMS Sunflower (Royal Navy).
F 353	Kriegsmarine	World War II: The Type A Marinefahrprahm was sunk by a bomb in La Goulette, Tunisia.
Fingal	Norway	World War II: The cargo ship (2,137 GRT, 1923) was torpedoed and sunk in the Pacific Ocean off Coffs Harbour, New South Wales, Australia (30°35′S 153°29′E) by I-180 (Imperial Japanese Navy) with the loss of twelve of her 31 crew. Survivors were rescued by USS Patterson (United States Navy).
Gharinda	United Kingdom	World War II: Convoy ONS 5: The cargo ship (5,306 GRT, 1919) was torpedoed and sunk in the Atlantic Ocean (53°10′N 44°40′W) by U-266 (Kriegsmarine). All 92 crew were rescued by HMS Tay (Royal Navy).
Hakkai Maru	Imperial Japanese Navy	World War II: The Hakkai Maru-class auxiliary gunboat was torpedoed and sunk in the Pacific Ocean off Ise-Wan, Honshu (34°11′N 137°41′E) by USS Sawfish (United States Navy). 121 troops and 3 crewmen were killed. 121 survivors were rescued by Manazuru (Imperial Japanese Navy).
Harbury	United Kingdom	World War II: Convoy ONS 5: The cargo ship (5,081 GRT, 1933) straggled behind the convoy. She was torpedoed, shelled and sunk in the Atlantic Ocean 500 nautical miles (930 km) south of Cape Farewell, Greenland (55°01′N 42°59′W) by U-628 (Kriegsmarine) with the loss of seven of her 49 crew. Survivors were rescued by HMT Northern Spray (Royal Navy).
Harperley	United Kingdom	World War II: Convoy ONS 5: The cargo ship (4,586 GRT, 1930) was torpedoed and sunk in the Atlantic Ocean (55°00′N 42°58′W) by U-264 (Kriegsmarine) with the loss of ten of her 49 crew. Survivors were rescued by HMT Northern Spray (Royal Navy). Harperley later sank at 55°03′N 42°56′W.
Hartwelson	United States	The 3,087-gross register ton cargo ship ran aground on Bantam Rock off the coast of Maine and sank nearby in waters up to 30 feet (9.1 m) deep without loss of life, 8 nautical miles (15 km; 9.2 mi) south of Boothbay Harbor, Maine, at 43°43′47″N 069°37′26″W.
Holmbury	United Kingdom	World War II: The cargo ship (4,566 GRT, 1925) was torpedoed and sunk in the Atlantic Ocean 170 nautical miles (310 km) west of Cape Palmas, Liberia (4°30′N 10°20′W) by U-123 (Kriegsmarine) with the loss of two of her 46 crew. The captain was taken aboard U-123 as a prisoner of war, other survivors reached land in their lifeboats.
Kinko Maru	Japan	World War II: The cargo ship (1,264 GRT) was torpedoed and sunk in the Yellow Sea by USS Snook (United States Navy). 16 crew and 1 passenger were killed.
Kreml	Soviet Union	World War II: The cargo ship was torpedoed and damaged 22 nautical miles (41 km) south of Cape Koder by U-9 (Kriegsmarine). She was declared at total loss.
Maria Pia	Italy	World War II: The cargo ship was shelled and sunk in the Mediterranean Sea by HMS Tactician (Royal Navy). All 16 crew survived.
North Britain	United Kingdom	World War II: Convoy ONS 5: The cargo ship (4,635 GRT, 1940) straggled behind the convoy. She was torpedoed and sunk in the Atlantic Ocean (55°08′N 42°43′W) by U-707 (Kriegsmarine) with the loss of 35 of her 46 crew. Survivors were rescued by HMT Northern Spray (Royal Navy). North Britainwas on a voyage from Glasgow, Renfrewshire to Halifax, Nova Scotia, Canada.
RD 23	Regia Marina	World War II: The RD-class minesweeper was sunk at La Goulette, Tunisia by Allied aircraft.
RD 42	Regia Marina	World War II: The RD-class minesweeper was sunk at La Goulette, Tunisia by Allied aircraft.
RD 44	Regia Marina	World War II: The RD-class minesweeper was sunk at Bizerte, Tunisia by Allied aircraft.
RD 57	Regia Marina	World War II: The RD-class minesweeper was sunk at La Goulette, Tunisia by Allied aircraft.
San Antonio	Germany	World War II: The cargo ship was bombed and sunk by Allied Consolidated B-24 Liberator aircraft off Cape St Vito, Italy. An Italian escort rescued 52 men of the around 80 aboard.
Selvistan	United Kingdom	World War II: Convoy ONS 5: The cargo ship (5,136 GRT, 1924) was torpedoed and sunk in the Atlantic Ocean (53°10′N 44°40′W) by U-266 (Kriegsmarine) with the loss of six of her 46 crew. Survivors were rescued by HMS Tay (Royal Navy).
Sempre Avanti	Italy	World War II: The sailing vessel was sunk by a mine in the Mediterranean Sea while sailing from Trapani to Pantelleria. The crew survived the sinking.
U-638	Kriegsmarine	World War II: Convoy ONS 5: The Type VIIC submarine was depth charged and sunk in the Atlantic Ocean north east of Newfoundland (54°12′N 44°05′W) by HMS Sunflower (Royal Navy) with the loss of all 44 crew.
VAS 223	Regia Marina	World War II: The VAS 201-class submarine chaser was beached/wrecked between Palermo, Sicily and Bizerte, Tunisia after being damaged by Allied aircraft.
Wentworth	United Kingdom	World War II: Convoy ONS 5: The cargo ship (5,212 GRT, 1919) was torpedoed and damaged in the Atlantic Ocean (53°59′N 43°55′W) with the loss of five of her 47 crew. Survivors were rescued by HMS Loosestrife (Royal Navy), which scuttled the ship.
West Madaket	United States	World War II: Convoy ONS 5: The Design 1013 cargo ship straggled behind the convoy. She was torpedoed and sunk in the Atlantic Ocean south of Cape Farewell, Greenland (54°47′N 44°12′W) by U-584 (Kriegsmarine). All 61 crew were rescued by HMS Pink (Royal Navy).
West Maximus	United States	World War II: Convoy ONS 5: The Design 1013 cargo ship was torpedoed and sunk in the Atlantic Ocean (55°10′N 43°00′W) by U-264 (Kriegsmarine) with the loss of six of the 62 people aboard. Survivors were rescued by HMT Northern Spray (Royal Navy).

== 6 May ==
List of shipwrecks: 6 May 1943
Ship	State	Description
Amazone	Netherlands	World War II: The cargo ship was torpedoed and sunk in the Atlantic Ocean off Miami, Florida, United States (27°21′N 80°04′W) by U-333 (Kriegsmarine) with the loss of 14 of her 25 crew. Survivors were rescued by USS PC-484 (United States Navy). (Look 06/05/1942)
FR-60	Regia Marina	World War II: The auxiliary minelayer was scuttled at Bizerte, Tunisia.
FR-74	Regia Marina	World War II: The auxiliary minesweeper, a former SC-1-class submarine chaser, was scuttled at Bizerte, Tunisia.
FR-75 Madame de Pompei	Regia Marina	World War II: The auxiliary minesweeper was scuttled at Bizerte, Tunisia.
FR-77 Ravigan	Regia Marina	World War II: The auxiliary minesweeper was scuttled at Bizerte, Tunisia.
FR-78 Heron I	Regia Marina	World War II: The auxiliary minesweeper was scuttled at Bizerte, Tunisia.
FR-79 Pen Men	Regia Marina	World War II: The auxiliary minesweeper was scuttled at Bizerte, Tunisia.
FR 116	Regia Marina	World War II: The Requin-class submarine was scuttled at Bizerte.
FR 117	Regia Marina	World War II: The Circé-class submarine was scuttled at Bizerte.
Halsey	United States	World War II: The tanker was torpedoed and sunk in the Atlantic Ocean off Jupiter Inlet, Florida (27°14′N 80°03′W) by U-333 (Kriegsmarine). All 32 crew were rescued by American fishing vessels.
I-O-32	Luftwaffe	World War II: The Siebelgefäß landing craft was bombed and sunk at Marsala.
I-O-64	Luftwaffe	World War II: The Siebelgefäß landing craft was probably bombed and sunk at Marsala.
Java Arrow	United States	World War II: The tanker was torpedoed and damaged 8 nautical miles (15 km) off Vero Beach, Florida (27°35′N 80°08′W) by U-333 (Kriegsmarine) with the loss of two of her 47 crew. Survivors abandoned ship, and were rescued by USS PC-483 (United States Navy). Java Arrow was later towed into Port Everglades, Florida. Subsequently repaired and returned to service in 1943 as Kerry Patch.
Onda	Italy	World War II: the fishing vessel was sunk by gunfire in the Mediterranean Sea off Asinara Island, Italy (40°58′N 08°20′E) by HMS Safari (Royal Navy). Seven of her nine crew were killed.
PiLB 102	Kriegsmarine	World War II: The PiLB 39 Type personnel landing craft was damaged beyond repair by an air attack at Reggio Calabria, Italy.
PiLB 104	Kriegsmarine	World War II: The PiLB 39 Type personnel landing craft was damaged beyond repair by an air attack at Reggio Calabria, Italy.
PiLB 124	Kriegsmarine	World War II: The PiLB 39 Type personnel landing craft was damaged beyond repair by an air attack at Reggio Calabria, Italy.
PiLB 125	Kriegsmarine	The PiLB 39 Type personnel landing craft was lost on this date.
RD 18	Regia Marina	World War II: The RD-class minesweeper was sunk off Cape Zebib, Tunisia by Allied aircraft.
Saint Sauveur	Vichy France	World War II: The cargo ship was sunk by Allied aircraft off Reggio di Calabria, Italy. She was salvaged in September, repaired and entered Italian service in 1944 as Capo Faro.
SF 168	Luftwaffe	World War II: The Siebel ferry was bombed and sunk off Marsala.
SF 195	Luftwaffe	World War II: The Siebel ferry was bombed and sunk off Marsala.
SF 201	Luftwaffe	World War II: The Siebel ferry was bombed and sunk off Marsala.
SF 202	Luftwaffe	World War II: The Siebel ferry was bombed and sunk off Marsala.
SF 213	Luftwaffe	World War II: The Siebel ferry was bombed and sunk off Marsala.
SF 222	Luftwaffe	World War II: The Siebel ferry was bombed and sunk off Marsala.
SF 226	Luftwaffe	World War II: The Siebel ferry was bombed and sunk off Marsala.
Tifone	Regia Marina	World War II: The Ciclone-class torpedo boat was heavily damaged by American aircraft off Tunisia and was grounded. Six crew were killed. She was scuttled at the small fishing port of Korbous the next day.
U-125	Kriegsmarine	World War II: The Type IXC submarine was rammed and damaged in the Atlantic Ocean (52°30′N 45°20′W) by HMS Oribi (Royal Navy). She was then shelled and sunk by HMS Snowflake (Royal Navy). All 54 crew took to their lifeboats, but the Admiralty forbade the British ships to rescue them and they subsequently died.
U-192	Kriegsmarine	World War II: The Type IXC/40 submarine was depth charged and sunk in the Atlantic Ocean south east of Cape Farewell, Greenland (53°06′N 45°02′W) by HMS Loosestrife (Royal Navy) with the loss of all 55 crew.
U-438	Kriegsmarine	World War II: The Type VIIC submarine was depth charged and sunk in the Atlantic Ocean (52°00′N 45°10′W) by HMS Pelican (Royal Navy) with the loss of all 48 crew.
U-531	Kriegsmarine	World War II: The Type IXC/40 submarine was depth charged and sunk in the Atlantic Ocean north east of Newfoundland (52°48′N 45°18′W) by HMS Vidette (Royal Navy).
U-630	Kriegsmarine	World War II: The Type VIIC submarine was depth charged and sunk in the Atlantic Ocean north east of Newfoundland (52°31′N 44°50′W) by HMS Vidette (Royal Navy) with the loss of all 47 crew.
USS YF-575	United States Navy	The self-propelled covered lighter ran aground and sank off Atlantic City, New Jersey.

== 7 May ==
List of shipwrecks: 7 May 1943
Ship	State	Description
HMAS Adele	Royal Australian Navy	The armed yacht (288 GRT, 1906) was wrecked on a breakwater at the entrance to Port Kembla, New South Wales.
Albina	Italy	World War II: The sailing vessel was damaged beyond repair by gunfire south of San Lucido, Italy by HMS Unrivalled (Royal Navy). The crew survived, only one was wounded.
Berakit	Netherlands	World War II: The cargo ship (6,608 GRT, 1924) was torpedoed and sunk in the Indian Ocean, east of the Felidhu Atoll in the Maldives at the entrance to One and Half Degree Channel (3°40′N 75°20′E) by I-27 (Imperial Japanese Navy). Her master was taken as a prisoner of war; four crewmen were killed.
Gouverneur General Pasquier	(France) Vichy French	World War II: The cargo liner was sunk by mines in the South China Sea off the coast of French Indochina.
Hermes	Kriegsmarine	World War II: The Vasilefs Georgios-class destroyer, badly damaged in a British air attack on 30 April 1943, was scuttled at La Goulette, Tunisia.
KT 5	Kriegsmarine	World War II: The Marinefahrpram was shelled in the Mediterranean Sea off Cape Bon, Tunisia. She sank two days later.
KT 9	Kriegsmarine	World War II: The Marinefahrpram was shelled in the Mediterranean Sea off Cape Bon. She sank two days later.
KT 21	Kriegsmarine	World War II: The Marinefahrpram was shelled in the Mediterranean Sea off Cape Bon. She sank two days later.
Laconikos	Greece	World War II: Convoy SL 128: The cargo ship (3,803 GRT, 1914) was torpedoed and sunk in the Atlantic Ocean north east of the Azores, Portugal (41°40′N 18°13′W) by U-89 (Kriegsmarine) with the loss of 23 of her 34 crew. Survivors were rescued by HMS Shippigan (Royal Navy).
MO-209	Soviet Navy	World War II: The MO-4-class patrol vessel was sunk by a mine off Gogland in the Gulf of Finland (60°04′N 27°14′W).
MS 22	Regia Marina	World War II: The MS 11-class MS boat was sunk off Tunis, Tunisia by Allied aircraft.
No. 106	Soviet Navy	The Sh-4 Type motor torpedo boat was lost on this date.
Samuel Jordan Kirkwood	United States	World War II: The Liberty ship torpedoed and sunk in the South Atlantic 125 nautical miles (232 km) south east of Ascension Island (15°00′S 7°00′W) by U-195 (Kriegsmarine). All 71 people aboard were rescued by a United States Army rescue boat.
Shinsei Maru No. 3	Japan	World War II: The cargo ship was torpedoed and sunk in the Yellow Sea by USS Snook (United States Navy).
Sirvall	Sweden	World War II: The ore carrier struck a mine and sank in the Baltic Sea off Rügen, Germany. There was no casualty.
Tamon Maru No. 5	Japan	World War II: The cargo ship was torpedoed and sunk in the off Benten Zaki, Honshu, Japan (40°05′N 141°53′E) by USS Wahoo (United States Navy). 11 crew were killed.
Tosei Maru	Japan	World War II: The cargo ship (4,363 GRT) was torpedoed and sunk in the Yellow Sea (35°58′N 123°31′E) by USS Snook (United States Navy). 38 crew were killed.
U-447	Kriegsmarine	World War II: The Type VIIC submarine was depth charged and sunk in the Atlantic Ocean west of Gibraltar (35°30′N 11°55′W) by two Lockheed Hudson aircraft of 233 Squadron, Royal Air Force with the loss of all 48 crew.
U-663	Kriegsmarine	World War II: The Type VIIC submarine was depth charged and damaged in the Bay of Biscay west of Brest, Finistère, France by Short Sunderland aircraft of 10 Squadron, Royal Australian Air Force. She sank the next day with the loss of all 49 crew.
VAS 231	Regia Marina	World War II: The VAS 231-class submarine chaser was sunk off Tunis by Allied aircraft.
ZF5	Kriegsmarine	World War II: The training hulk, the former French Le Fantasque-class destroyer L'Audacieux, was bombed and sunk at Bizerte, Tunisia by British aircraft.

== 8 May ==
List of shipwrecks: 8 May 1943
Ship	State	Description
Camerata	United Kingdom	World War II: The cargo ship (4,875 GRT, 1931) was sunk at anchor at Gibraltar with limpet mine by Italian frogmen. She was declared a constructive total loss, but was repaired in 1950 and entered Spanish service as Campo Grande.
HMT Daneman	Royal Navy	The naval trawler (516 GRT, 1937) struck an iceberg and sank under tow the next day in the Atlantic Ocean south of Greenland (58°03′N 44°00′E). Six of her 48 crew died.
Kagerō	Imperial Japanese Navy	World War II: The Kagerō-class destroyer was heavily damaged by an American mine in Blackett Strait south west of Rendova, Solomon Islands (8°08′S 156°55′E). She was further damaged by American aircraft and sank in the evening. There were 18 dead and 36 wounded.
Kuroshio	Imperial Japanese Navy	World War II: The Kagerō-class destroyer struck several American mines and sank in Blackett Strait south west of Rendova, Solomon Islands (8°08′S 156°55′E) with the loss of 83 lives.
Liv	Italy	World War II: The cargo ship was torpedoed and damaged at Porto Torres, Sardinia by HMS Safari (Royal Navy). She was bombed and sunk the next day by Royal Air Force aircraft. Liv was raised post-war. She was scrapped at La Spezia, Liguria in January 1948.
Mahsud	United Kingdom	World War II: The ship (7,540 GRT, 1917) was sunk at anchor at Gibraltar with Limpet mine by Italian frogmen.
Oyashio	Imperial Japanese Navy	World War II: The Kagerō-class destroyer was disabled by a mine in Blackett Strait south west of Rendova, Solomon Islands and then further damaged by American aircraft, sinking in the evening. There were 91 dead.
PiLB 251	Kriegsmarine	World War II: The PiLB 40 type landing craft was sunk by a bomb at Bizerta, Tunisia.
Pat Harrison	United States	World War II: The Liberty ship was damaged by an Italian limpet mine by Italian Frogmen at Gibraltar. She was beached but declared a constructive total loss. Scrapped in 1951. Two crewmen were killed.
Peppino Palomba	Italy	World War II: The cargo ship was torpedoed and sunk in the Mediterranean Sea by HMS Safari (Royal Navy).
Sumida Maru	Japan	World War II: The cargo ship was bombed and sunk in the Pacific Ocean off Madang with the loss of 18 lives.
Tomioka Maru	Japan	World War II: The cargo ship was bombed and sunk in the Pacific Ocean off Madang.

== 9 May ==
List of shipwrecks: 9 May 1943
Ship	State	Description
Aso Maru	Imperial Japanese Navy	World War II: The Fuji Maru-class auxiliary gunboat was torpedoed and sunk in the Sulu Sea south of Negros, Philippines (09°09′N 122°50′E) by USS Gar (United States Navy). The submarine commander reported around 75 survivors in the water and ordered to machine-gun them, sinking a lifeboat that opened fire on the submarine and estimating having killed about half. A Japanese source says only one crew was killed.
Corneville	Norway	World War II: The cargo ship (4,544 GRT, 1930) was torpedoed and sunk in the Gulf of Guinea 30 nautical miles (56 km) off Takoradi, Gold Coast (4°50′N 1°10′W) by U-515 (Kriegsmarine). All 41 crew survived.
Jimmu Maru	Japan	World War II: The oiler was torpedoed and damaged in the Pacific Ocean off Ofunato on the north east coast of Honshu by USS Wahoo (United States Navy). She was run ashore near Hirota Village (38°52′N 141°43′E) and abandoned as a Constructive Total Loss.
Kanbe	United Kingdom	World War II: Convoy TS 38: The cargo ship (6,244 GRT, 1941) was torpedoed and sunk in the Atlantic Ocean 60 nautical miles (110 km) south of Monrovia, Liberia by U-123 (Kriegsmarine) with the loss of 66 of her 71 crew. Survivors were rescued by Rio Francoli (Spain).
HMS MTB 61	Royal Navy	World War II: The Vosper 70'-class motor torpedo boat (40/47 t, 1942) was wrecked in the Mediterranean Sea off Kelibia, Tunisia, with the loss of one crew.
PiLB 258	Kriegsmarine	World War II: The PiLB 40 type landing craft was lost off Cape Bon, Tunisia.
Santa Maria Salina	Italy	World War II: The coaster was torpedoed and sunk south-east off Lipari, Italy by HMS Unrivalled (Royal Navy). There were 48 dead and 46 survivors.
SF 147	Kriegsmarine	World War II: The Siebel ferry was sunk by a destroyer off Cape Bon, Tunisia.
T 35 Seeaal	Kriegsmarine	World War II: The Siebel ferry was sunk by a destroyer off Cape Bon, Tunisia.
Takao Maru	Imperial Japanese Army	World War II: The British WWI C Class standard cargo ship was torpedoed and sunk in the Pacific Ocean off Ofunato on the north east coast of Honshu (38°57′N 141°49′E) by USS Wahoo (United States Navy). Two crewmen were killed.
VAS 212	Regia Marina	World War II: The VAS 201-class submarine chaser was sunk at Palermo, Sicily by Allied aircraft.
VAS 213	Regia Marina	World War II: The VAS 201-class submarine chaser was sunk at Palermo, Sicily by Allied aircraft.
VAS 229	Regia Marina	World War II: The VAS 201-class submarine chaser was sunk at Palermo, Sicily by Allied aircraft.
VAS 230	Regia Marina	World War II: The VAS 201-class submarine chaser was sunk at Palermo, Sicily by Allied aircraft.
HMCS Vercheres	Royal Canadian Navy	The auxiliary minesweeper (157 GRT, 1901) was destroyed by fire at Sorel, Quebec.

== 10 May ==
List of shipwrecks: 10 May 1943
Ship	State	Description
F 344	Kriegsmarine	World War II: The Type A Marinefahrprahm was sunk by Allied aircraft in the port of Pantelleria.
Kinai Maru	Imperial Japanese Navy	World War II: Convoy 4508: The Kinai Maru-class auxiliary transport was torpedoed and damaged in the Pacific Ocean 243 nautical miles (450 km) east of Saipan (14°33′N 149°23′E) by USS Plunger (United States Navy). Only one crew was killed. About 400 troops and passengers were taken off by Tatsutake Maru, she is torpedoed and sunk while taking them off. Kinai Maru was shelled and sunk by USS Plunger the next day (14°33′N 149°23′E).
HMS MTB 264	Royal Navy	World War II: The Elco 70' motor torpedo boat (27/32 t, 1941) was sunk by a mine in the Mediterranean Sea off Sousse, Tunisia.
HMAS Maroubra	Royal Australian Navy	World War II: The diving/stores ship (49 GRT, 1930) was strafed by nine Imperial Japanese Navy Mitsubishi A6M Zero fighter aircraft at Millingimbi, Northern Territories, Australia. She caught fire and sank. There were no casualty.
SKA-098	Soviet Navy	World War II: The patrol boat was sunk by a mine off Cape Myskhako in the Black Sea. Six of her 22 crew were killed.
Tatsutake Maru	Imperial Japanese Navy	World War II: Convoy 4508: The Tatsutake Maru-class ammunition ship was torpedoed and sunk in the Pacific Ocean 243 nautical miles (450 km; 280 mi) east of Saipan (14°33′N 149°23′E) by USS Plunger (United States Navy) while taking troops and passengers off Kinai Maru. Four crewmen and many evacuees of Kinai Maru were killed. Survivors were rescued by Hiyodori (Imperial Japanese Navy).

== 11 May ==
List of shipwrecks: 11 May 1943
Ship	State	Description
Antigone	United Kingdom	World War II: Convoy SC 129: The cargo ship (4,545 GRT) was torpedoed and sunk in the Atlantic Ocean 300 nautical miles (560 km) north west of the Azores, Portugal (40°30′N 32°30′W) by U-402 (Kriegsmarine) with the loss of three of her 46 crew. Survivors were rescued by Melrose Abbey (United Kingdom).
Grado	Norway	World War II: Convoy SC 129: The cargo ship (3,082 GRT) was torpedoed and sunk in the Atlantic Ocean (40°30′N 32°30′W) by U-402 (Kriegsmarine). All 36 crew were rescued by Melrose Abbey (United Kingdom) and 2 escort vessels.
I-O-41	Luftwaffe	World War II: The Siebelgefäß landing craft was bombed and sunk at Pantelleria.
HMS ML 133	Royal Navy	The Fairmile B motor launch (75 GRT) was destroyed in an accidental explosion off Camusnagaul, Scotland with the loss of one crew.
Nailsea Meadow	United Kingdom	World War II: The cargo ship (4,962 GRT) was torpedoed and sunk in the Indian Ocean 40 nautical miles (74 km) south of Port St Johns, Cape Colony (32°04′S 29°14′E) by U-196 (Kriegsmarine) with the loss of two of her 44 crew. Survivors were rescued by R-6 ( South African Air Force).
No. 404	Soviet Union	World War II: The auxiliary minesweeper, while under tow from engine failure, was bombed by German fighters and grounded in shallow water.
Partinico	Italy	World War II: The cargo ship was bombed and sunk by Allied aircraft at Catania.
SF 225	Luftwaffe	World War II: The Siebel ferry was bombed and sunk at Pantelleria.
Tinhow	United Kingdom	World War II: The cargo ship (5,232 GRT) was torpedoed and sunk in the Mozambique Channel (25°15′S 33°30′E) by U-181 (Kriegsmarine) with the loss of 75 lives (25 crew and 50 passengers, most of the latter merchant sailors). The 128 survivors (41 crew members, twelve gunners and 75 passengers) were rescued by Portuguese fishing vessels.
U-528	Kriegsmarine	World War II: The Type IXC/40 submarine was depth charged and sunk in the Atlantic Ocean (46°55′N 14°44′W) by Handley Page Halifax aircraft of 58 Squadron, Royal Air Force and HMS Fleetwood (Royal Navy) with the loss of eleven of her 56 crew.
Yodogawa Maru	Imperial Japanese Navy	World War II: Convoy R-09: The Shinko Maru-class auxiliary collier/oiler was torpedoed and sunk in the Pacific Ocean north east of Manus Island (00°40′N 148°55′E) by USS Grayback (United States Navy). Two crewmen were killed.

== 12 May ==
List of shipwrecks: 12 May 1943
Ship	State	Description
Brand	Norway	World War II: Convoy HX 243: The cargo ship (4,819 GRT, 1927) straggled behind the convoy. She was torpedoed and sunk in the Atlantic Ocean (47°19′N 24°41′W) by U-603 (Kriegsmarine) with the loss of three of her 42 crew. Survivors were rescued by HMCS Morden (Royal Canadian Navy).
Fort Concord	United Kingdom	World War II: Convoy HX 237: The Fort ship (7,138 GRT, 1942) straggled behind the convoy. She was torpedoed and sunk in the Atlantic Ocean (46°05′N 25°20′W) by U-456 (Kriegsmarine) with the loss of 37 of her 56 crew. Survivors were rescued by HMCS Drumheller (Royal Canadian Navy) and U-103 (Kriegsmarine).
I-31	Imperial Japanese Navy	World War II: The Type B1 submarine was depth charged, shelled and sunk in the Pacific Ocean five nautical miles (9.3 km) north east of Chichagof Harbor, Attu Island, Alaska, United States (52°08′S 177°38′E) by USS Edwards (United States Navy). Lost with all 95 hands.
MAS 572	Regia Marina	The MAS 552-class MAS boat was sunk in the Black Sea south of the Crimea in a collision with MAS 566 (Regia Marina).
HMS MMS 89	Royal Navy	World War II: The MMS-class minesweeper was sunk in the Mediterranean Sea by a mine off Bizerte, Tunisia. One crew died of wounds.
RTShch-119	Soviet Navy	World War II: The K-15/M-17-class river minesweeping launch belonging to the Volga military flotilla was sunk by a mine near Ekaterinovka, Asthrakan Oblast, Russia. All eight crew were killed.
Sandanger	Norway	World War II: Convoy HX 237: The tanker (9,432 GRT, 1938) straggled behind the convoy. She was torpedoed and sunk in the Atlantic Ocean (approximately 49°N 21°W) by U-221 (Kriegsmarine) with the loss of twenty of her 39 crew. Survivors were rescued by HMCS Kootenay (Royal Canadian Navy).
SKR-31	Soviet Navy	World War II: The auxiliary guard ship was sunk by German Focke-Wulf Fw 190 fighter-bomber aircraft off Cape Tsyp-Navolok. 51 crew were killed.
Sumatra Maru	Imperial Japanese Army	World War II: The Celebes Maru No. 1-class transport was torpedoed and sunk in the Pacific Ocean in a shallow water cove off Bulusan, Luzon, Philippines (12°44′N 124°08′E) by USS Gudgeon (United States Navy). One man was killed. Abandoned as a constructive total loss on 27 May.
TKA-21	Soviet Navy	World War II: The A-2 (Higgins 78')-class motor torpedo boat was sunk by German Focke-Wulf Fw 190 fighter-bomber aircraft off Cape Tsyp-Navolok. Two crew were killed.
U-89	Kriegsmarine	World War II: The Type VIIC submarine was sunk in the Atlantic Ocean (46°30′N 25°40′W) by a Fairey Swordfish aircraft of 811 Squadron, Fleet Air Arm, based on HMS Biter and by HMS Broadway and HMS Lagan (all Royal Navy) with the loss of all 48 crew.
U-186	Kriegsmarine	World War II: The Type IXC/40 submarine was depth charged and sunk in the Atlantic Ocean north of the Azores, Portugal (41°54′N 31°49′W) by HMS Hesperus (Royal Navy) with the loss of all 53 crew.
U-456	Kriegsmarine	World War II: The Type VIIC submarine was damaged in the Atlantic Ocean by a Fido homing torpedo dropped by a Consolidated B-24 Liberator aircraft of 86 Squadron, Royal Air Force. She dived in an effort to evade an attack by HMS Opportune (Royal Navy) but was lost with all 49 crew.

== 13 May ==
For the loss of the Italian cargo ship Paolo on this date, see the entry for 28 February 1943.

List of shipwrecks: 13 May 1943
Ship	State	Description
Klaus Howaldt	Germany	World War II: The cargo ship was torpedoed by Handley-Page Hampden aircraft of 455 Squadron, Royal Australian Air Force south of Lista, Norway (58°03′45″N 6°39′15″E), and was beached or sank.
Mambí	Cuba	World War II: Convoy NC 18: The tanker (1,983 GRT) was torpedoed and sunk in the Atlantic Ocean 6 nautical miles (11 km) north of Manatí, Cuba (21°25′N 76°40′W), by U-176 (Kriegsmarine) with the loss of 23 of her 34 crew.
Mocenigo	Regia Marina	World War II: The Marcello-class submarine was bombed and sunk in the port of Cagliari, Sardinia by United States Army Air Force aircraft. The whole crew survived.
Nickeliner	United States	World War II: Convoy NC 18: The tanker (2,249 GRT) was torpedoed and sunk in the Atlantic Ocean 6 nautical miles (11 km) north of Manatí, Cuba (21°25′N 76°40′W) by U-176 (Kriegsmarine). All 31 crew were rescued by a Cuban submarine chaser.
Santa Rita	Italy	World War II: The cargo ship was bombed and sunk at Cagliari by United States Army Air Forces bomber aircraft. She was refloated after the war but was sunk in 1946 by a mine while being towed to a naval shipyard for repairs.
U-753	Kriegsmarine	World War II: The Type VIIC submarine was depth charged and sunk in the Atlantic Ocean (48°37′N 22°39′W) by a Short Sunderland aircraft of 423 Squadron, Royal Canadian Air Force and also by HMCS Drumheller (Royal Canadian Navy) and HMS Lagan (Royal Navy) with the loss of all 47 crew.

== 14 May ==
List of shipwrecks: 14 May 1943
Ship	State	Description
Agata	Italy	World War II: The cargo ship was bombed and sunk at Olbia by United States Army Air Forces North American B-25 Mitchell bomber aircraft of the 310th Bombardment Group.
Anna Maria II	Regia Marina	World War II: The auxiliary minesweeper was sunk by Allied aircraft off Katakolo, Greece, with the loss of four lives.
AHS Centaur	Australian Army	Propaganda poster based on the sinking of AHS Centaur ( Red Cross): World War II: The hospital ship (3,222 GRT, 1924) was torpedoed and sunk in the Pacific Ocean off Queensland (27°16′59″S 153°59′13″E), probably by I-177 (Imperial Japanese Navy), with the loss of 332 of the 396 people aboard.
Città di Trieste	Italy	World War II: The cargo ship was bombed and sunk at Civitavecchia by United States Army Air Forces Boeing B-17 Flying Fortress aircraft of the 2nd and 99th Bomb Groups.
Erice	Italy	World War II: The cargo ship was bombed and sunk at Civitavecchia by American aircraft.
HDML 1154	Royal Navy	World War II: The Harbour Defence Motor Launch (44/52 t, 1943) was sunk by a mine off of Bizerte, Tunisia, with the loss of six crew.
M-8	Kriegsmarine	World War II: The minesweeper was torpedoed and sunk in the North Sea off Hook of Holland, South Holland, Netherlands (52°03′N 03°51′E) by HMMTB 232 (Royal Navy). 53 crew were killed.
M-122	Soviet Navy	World War II: The M-class submarine was sunk off the Rybachiy Peninsula (69°56′N 32°53′E) by Focke-Wulf Fw 190 aircraft of Jagdgeschwader 5, Luftwaffe, with the loss of all 22 crew.
Mira	Italy	World War II: The cargo ship was bombed and sunk at Civitavecchia by American aircraft. She was later refloated.
Ro-102	Imperial Japanese Navy	World War II: The Ro-100-class submarine was sunk in the Pacific Ocean 5 nautical miles (9.3 km) west of Lae New Guinea by USS PT-150 and USS PT-152 (both United States Navy. Lost with all 42 hands.
San Jose	Germany	World War II: The cargo ship was sunk at Olbia, Sardinia, Italy in an Allied air raid. Refloated post-war, repaired and returned to service in 1950.
U-235	Kriegsmarine	World War II: The Type VIIC submarine was sunk at Kiel, Schleswig-Holstein in an American air raid. Two crew were killed. She was subsequently raised, repaired and returned to service.
U-236	Kriegsmarine	World War II: The Type VIIC submarine was sunk at Kiel in an American air raid. There were no casualties. She was subsequently raised, repaired and returned to service.
U-237	Kriegsmarine	World War II: The Type VIIC submarine was sunk at Kiel in an American air raid. There were no casualties. She was subsequently raised, repaired and returned to service.
U-640	Kriegsmarine	World War II: The Type VIIC submarine was depth charged and sunk in the Atlantic Ocean south east of Cape Farewell, Greenland (60°32′N 31°05′W) by a Consolidated PBY Catalina aircraft of the United States Navy with the loss of all 49 crew.

== 15 May ==
List of shipwrecks: 15 May 1943
Ship	State	Description
Cormull	United Kingdom	World War II: The coaster struck a mine in the North Sea 16 nautical miles (30 km) north east of Great Yarmouth, Norfolk and was severely damaged. She was on a voyage from Blyth, Northumberland to London. Subsequently repaired and returned to service.
Indus Maru	Imperial Japanese Army	World War II: Convoy No. 3207: The cargo ship was torpedoed and sunk in the Sulu Sea south of Negros (13°07′N 121°49′E) by USS Gar (United States Navy). Between the Indus Maru and Meikai Maru sinkings, 1,648 survivors were rescued by Matsuwa (Imperial Japanese Navy).
Irish Oak	Ireland	Irish Oak after being torpedoed by U-607, painting by Kenneth King, National Maritime Museum of Ireland World War II: The Design 1019 cargo ship (5,589 GRT) was torpedoed and sunk in the Atlantic Ocean (47°51′N 25°53′W) by U-607 (Kriegsmarine). All 33 crew were rescued by Irish Plane (Ireland).
Meikai Maru	Imperial Japanese Army	World War II: Convoy No. 3207: The Peking Maru-class auxiliary transport ship was torpedoed and sunk in the Sulu Sea south of Negros, Philippines (13°10′N 121°50′E) by USS Gar (United States Navy). Twelve crewmen were killed. Between the Indus Maru and Meikai Maru sinkings, 1,648 survivors were rescued by Matsuwa (Imperial Japanese Navy).
Maroussio Logothetis	Greece	World War II: The cargo ship (4,669 GRT, 1913) was torpedoed and sunk in the Atlantic Ocean (5°28′N 14°28′W) by U-105 (Kriegsmarine) with the loss of 25 of her 39 crew. One crew member was taken aboard U-105 as a prisoner of war. Other survivors were rescued by a Consolidated PBY Catalina aircraft of 270 Squadron, Royal Air Force.
Snurp II	Norway	The fishing vessel(126 GRT) sank in Skorafjorden, Norway due to overloading with the loss of all four hands.
U-176	Kriegsmarine	World War II: The Type IXC submarine (1,540 GRT) was depth charged and sunk in the Atlantic Ocean 23°21′N 80°18′W) by CS-13 (Cuban Revolutionary Navy) with the loss of all 53 crew.
U-266	Kriegsmarine	World War II: The Type VIIC submarine (1,070 GRT) was depth charged and sunk in the Atlantic Ocean (45°28′N 10°20′W) by a Handley Page Halifax aircraft of 58 Squadron, Royal Air Force with the loss of all 47 crew.
UJ 2213 Heureux	Kriegsmarine	World War II: The naval trawler/submarine chaser (1,116 GRT) was shelled and sunk in the Mediterranean Sea off Monaco (43°25′N 07°25′E) by HMS Sickle (Royal Navy). There were 46 dead and 70 survivors (another source says 9 missing and 67 survivors).

== 16 May ==
List of shipwrecks: 16 May 1943
Ship	State	Description
Cities Service Boston	United States	The cargo ship ran aground at Bass Point, New South Wales, Australia. She was a total loss.
Enrico Tazzoli	Regia Marina	World War II: The Calvi-class submarine was depth charged and sunk by a Handley Page Halifax aircraft of 58 Squadron, Royal Air Force.
Raju	Merivoimat	The Syöksy-class motor torpedo boat was wrecked off Koivisto.
U-182	Kriegsmarine	World War II: The Type IX submarine was depth charged and sunk by USS MacKenzie (United States Navy) with the loss of all 61 crew and two prisoners of war. The latter were the captains of Adelfotis (Greece) and Aloe (United Kingdom).
U-463	Kriegsmarine	World War II: The Type XIV submarine was depth charged and sunk in the Bay of Biscay (45°57′N 11°40′W) by a Handley Page Halifax aircraft of 58 Squadron, Royal Air Force with the loss of all 57 crew.
William K. Vanderbilt	United States	World War II: The Liberty ship was torpedoed and sunk in the Pacific Ocean off Suva, Fiji (18°41′S 175°07′E) by I-19 (Imperial Japanese Navy). The lifeboats were machine gunned by I-19 but only one crewman was killed in the sinking.

== 17 May ==
List of shipwrecks: 17 May 1943
Ship	State	Description
Alsedo	Spanish Navy	The Alsedo-class destroyer was severely damaged by fire at Ferrol.
Aymeric	United Kingdom	World War II: Convoy ONS 7: The cargo ship (5,196 GRT, 1919) was torpedoed and sunk in the Atlantic Ocean 145 miles west southwest of Cape Farewell (59°42′N 41°39′W) by U-657 (Kriegsmarine) with the loss of 53 of her 78 crew. Survivors were rescued by Copeland (United Kingdom) and HMT Northern Wave (Royal Navy).
Bygdøy	Norway	World War II: The cargo ship (1,252 GRT, 1921) struck a mine and sank in Öresund. All fourteen crew survived.
England Maru	Imperial Japanese Army	World War II: Convoy P-512: The Daifuku Maru No. 1-class transport (5,829 t, 1919) was torpedoed and sunk in the Pacific Ocean (00°45′S 148°30′E) by USS Grayback (United States Navy). Two hundred and thirty-two troops and thirteen crewmen were killed.
Eurostadt	Germany	World War II: The tanker was torpedoed and sunk by S-56 (Soviet Navy) off Vadsø, Norway. 11 of her 26 crew were killed.
Galicia	Spanish Navy	The Almirante Cervera-class cruiser was severely damaged by fire at Ferrol.
H.M. Storey	United States	World War II: The oil tanker was torpedoed and sunk in the Pacific Ocean off Vanuatu (17°30′S 173°02′E) by I-25 (Imperial Japanese Navy). The 63 made it to lifeboats, two crewman killed.
Krasnyy Dagestan	Soviet Navy	World War II: The auxiliary river gunboat was damaged beyond repair by a mine near Gusiny Island on the Volga River. Two sailors were killed.
Kyphissia	Germany	World War II: The cargo ship was torpedoed and sunk in the North Sea off Texel, North Holland, Netherlands by Bristol Beaufighter aircraft of Coastal Command, Royal Air Force.
Lazaga	Spanish Navy	The Alsedo-class destroyer was severely damaged by fire at Ferrol.
M-414	Kriegsmarine	World War II: The Type 1940 minesweeper was torpedoed and sunk off Texel by Bristol Beaufighter aircraft of Coastal Command.
Mendez Nuñez	Spanish Navy	The Blas de Lezo-class cruiser was severely damaged by fire at Ferrol.
Miguel de Cervantes	Spanish Navy	The Almirante Cervera-class cruiser was severely damaged by fire at Ferrol.
Northmoor	United Kingdom	World War II: Convoy LMD 17: The cargo ship (4,392 GRT, 1928) was torpedoed and sunk in the Indian Ocean (28°27′S 32°43′E) by U-198 (Kriegsmarine) with the loss of twelve of her 39 crew. Survivors were rescued by HMT St Loman (Royal Navy).
PiLB 66	Kriegsmarine	The PiLB 39 Type personnel landing craft ran aground between Palermo and Messina in a storm. She was later scuttled.
U-128	Kriegsmarine	U-128 World War II: The Type IXC submarine was depth charged and sunk in the Atlantic Ocean (10°00′N 35°35′W) by USS Jouett and USS Moffett (both United States Navy) with the loss of seven of her 54 crew.
U-646	Kriegsmarine	World War II: The Type VIIC submarine was depth charged and sunk in the Atlantic Ocean south east of Iceland (62°10′N 14°37′W) by a Lockheed Hudson aircraft of 269 Squadron, Royal Air Force with the loss of all 46 crew.
U-657	Kriegsmarine	World War II: The Type VIIC submarine was depth charged and sunk in the Atlantic Ocean east of Cape Farewell, Greenland (58°54′N 42°33′W) by HMS Swale (Royal Navy) with the loss of all 47 crew.
V 1110 Hermann Hinrichs	Kriegsmarine	World War II: The Vorpostenboot was torpedoed and sunk in the North Sea off Vlieland, Friesland, Netherlands by Bristol Beaufighter aircraft of Coastal Command. Eight crew were killed.
Woosung Maru	Japan	The Standard British WWI C-class cargo ship ran aground on a reef and sank off Chiba Prefecture, Honshu.

== 18 May ==
List of shipwrecks: 18 May 1943
Ship	State	Description
HMS Barwick	Royal Navy	The rescue and salvage tug was engulfed by flames when the tanker Delphinula (United Kingdom) exploded at Alexandria, Egypt. Her crew lost two killed, five who died from their wounds, five missing presumed killed and five wounded. She remained afloat, was repaired and resumed service in January 1944.
Delphinula	United Kingdom	The tanker was driven ashore on 9 May near Alexandria, Egypt. She was on a voyage from Haifa, Palestine to Alexandria. As her cargo was taken out to lighten her, oil splilled around her and caught fire on 18 May, burning the tanker and two tugs. The fire was extinguished on 20 June and the twisted wreck broke in two on 21 July. She was declared a constructive total loss. Four crew were killed.
Empire Eve	United Kingdom	World War II: The CAM ship (5,979 GRT, 1941) was torpedoed and sunk in the Mediterranean Sea off Algeria (36°37′N 00°46′E) by U-414 (Kriegsmarine) with the loss of five of her 61 crew. Survivors were rescued by HMS Barfoil and a landing craft tank (both Royal Navy).
H. M. Storey	United States	World War II: The tanker was torpedoed and sunk in the Pacific Ocean (17°30′S 173°02′E) by I-25 (Imperial Japanese Navy). Two crewmen were killed. The 63 survivors were rescued by USS Fletcher (United States Navy).
M-345	Kriegsmarine	World War II: The Type 1940 minesweeper was bombed and sunk in the North Sea off Dunkerque, Nord, France by a Handley Page Hampden aircraft of Coastal Command, Royal Air Force.
PiLB 54	Kriegsmarine	World War II: The PiLB 39 Type personnel landing craft was sunk by an air attack at Trapani, Sicily.
RD 16	Regia Marina	World War II: The RD-class minesweeper was sunk at Trapani, Sicily by Allied aircraft. She was raised, repaired and returned to service 1944–1945.
RD 38	Regia Marina	World War II: The RD-class minesweeper was sunk at Trapani, Sicily by Allied aircraft. She was raised, repaired and returned to service 1944–1945.
Taurus	Egypt	The harbour tug was engulfed by flames when the tanker Delphinula (United Kingdom) exploded at Alexandria, Egypt, and was abandoned.
Terushima Maru	Japan	World War II: The cargo ship was torpedoed and sunk in the Pacific Ocean by USS Pollack (United States Navy).
V 1106 Ernst von Briesen	Kriegsmarine	World War II: The Vorpostenboot was torpedoed and sunk in the North Sea off Borkum (55°36′N 6°04′E) by Bristol Beaufighter aircraft of Coastal Command with the loss of 5 lives.

== 19 May ==
List of shipwrecks: 19 May 1943
Ship	State	Description
Angelus	United Kingdom	World War II: The three-masted schooner (255 GRT) was shelled and sunk in the Atlantic Ocean (38°40′N 64°00′W) by U-161 (Kriegsmarine). All ten crew left the ship in a lifeboat but eight died of exposure before the two survivors were rescued by USS Turner (United States Navy) one week later.
Enrica	Italy	World War II: The tug (269 GRT) was torpedoed and sunk off Pizzo Calabro, Italy (38°45′N 16°00′E) by HMS Unbroken (Royal Navy). There were 13 dead and 8 survivors.
F 309	Kriegsmarine	World War II: The Type A Marinefahrprahm was sunk by Soviet aircraft off Anapa (45°04′N 36°53′E). All crew were rescued, one of them wounded.
F 367	Kriegsmarine	World War II: The Type A Marinefahrprahm was sunk by Soviet aircraft off Anapa (44°53′N 37°20′E). All aboard were rescued, one of them wounded.
Général Bonaparte	France	World War II: The passenger ship was torpedoed and sunk in the Mediterranean Sea by HMS Sportsman (Royal Navy) with the loss of 137 lives. The 147 survivors were rescued by TA10 and TA11 (both Kriegsmarine).
G. G. 370 Marina	Sweden	World War II: The fishing boat was heavily damaged by a mine in the Kattegat west of Skagen, Denmark, and sank before reaching land. There was no casualty.
Pervansh	Soviet Union	World War II: The tug was sunk in the Black Sea off Sochi by S-49 and S-72 (both Kriegsmarine) with the loss of 21 lives.
U-273	Kriegsmarine	World War II: The Type VIIC submarine was depth charged and sunk in the Atlantic Ocean (59°25′N 24°33′W) by a Lockheed Hudson aircraft of 269 Squadron, Royal Air Force with the loss of all 46 hands.
U-954	Kriegsmarine	World War II: The Type VIIC submarine was hedgehogged and sunk in the Atlantic Ocean south east of Cape Farewell, Greenland (54°54′N 34°19′W) by HMS Jed and HMS Sennen (both Royal Navy) with the loss of all 47 crew.

== 20 May ==
List of shipwrecks: 20 May 1943
Ship	State	Description
Bangkok Maru	Imperial Japanese Navy	World War II: The Bangkok Maru-class armed merchant cruiser (5,351 t, 1937) was torpedoed and sunk in the Pacific Ocean off Jaluit Atoll, Marshall Islands (06°47′N 169°42′E) by USS Pollack (United States Navy). Four hundred and ninety-six troops and six crewmen were killed. Survivors were rescued by Ikazuchi (Imperial Japanese Navy).
Benakat	Netherlands	World War II: The tanker (4,763 GRT, 1935) was torpedoed and sunk in the South Atlantic (6°05′S 12°56′W) by U-197 (Kriegsmarine). All 44 crew survived.
HMS Fantome	Royal Navy	World War II: The Algerine-class minesweeper (850/1,125 t, 1943) struck a mine in the Mediterranean Sea off Cape Bon, Tunisia. One crew died of wounds. She was declared a constructive total loss.
U-258	Kriegsmarine	World War II: The Type VII submarine was depth charged and sunk in the Atlantic Ocean (55°18′N 27°49′W) by a Consolidated B-24 Liberator aircraft of 120 Squadron, Royal Air Force with the loss of all 49 crew.

== 21 May ==
List of shipwrecks: 21 May 1943
Ship	State	Description
Bologna	Italy	World War II: The cargo ship (5,439 GRT) was torpedoed and sunk in the Adriatic Sea (38°34′N 15°44′E) by HMS Unbroken (Royal Navy). Bologna was on a voyage from Naples to Messina, Sicily.
MZ 733	Regia Marina	World War II: The Type A Marinefahrprahm (140 GRT) was sunk by Allied aircraft off Capo Granitola, Sicily. Seven crew were killed. The 12 survivors were rescued by MAS 544 (Regia Marina).
U-303	Kriegsmarine	World War II: The Type VIIC submarine (1,070 GRT) was torpedoed and sunk in the Mediterranean Sea off Toulon, Var, France (42°50′N 6°00′E) by HMS Sickle (Royal Navy) with the loss of 19 of her 47 crew.

== 22 May ==
List of shipwrecks: 22 May 1943
Ship	State	Description
Alpera	United Kingdom	World War II: The cargo ship was bombed and sunk 15 nautical miles (28 km) off Cape St. Vincent, Portugal by Luftwaffe aircraft. All 35 crew survived.
HMS LCV 825	Royal Navy	The landing craft vehicle blew up during exercises off west Scotland. One crew was killed.
Sainte Irène	Vichy France	The cargo ship, requisitioned by the French, then under German command, carrying a cargo of 250 lb (110 kg) bombs, was wrecked on Grune aux Dardes, Nantes, Loire Atlantique.
ShCh-408	Soviet Navy	World War II: The Shchuka-class submarine was shelled and sunk in the Baltic Sea by F 189, F 188, and F 191 all (Kriegsmarine). All 41 crew members were lost. The wreck was discovered in 2016, confirming shelling.
SKA-041	Soviet Navy	World War II: The guard ship was bombed and sunk in the Black Sea off Gelendzhik by Junkers Ju 87 aircraft of 1 Fliegerkorps, Luftwaffe. 14 crew were killed.
U-569	Kriegsmarine	World War II: The Type VIIC submarine was depth charged and damaged in the Atlantic Ocean by two Grumman TBM Avenger aircraft based on USS Bogue (United States Navy) with the loss of 21 of her 46 crew. She was consequently scuttled (50°40′N 35°21′W) due to damage received.

== 23 May ==
List of shipwrecks: 23 May 1943
Ship	State	Description
Leonardo da Vinci	Regia Marina	World War II: The Marconi-class submarine was depth charged and sunk in the Atlantic Ocean west of Portugal (42°16′N 15°40′W) by HMS Active and HMS Ness (both Royal Navy)
USS Niagara	United States Navy	World War II: The PT boat tender, a former gunboat, was bombed and damaged in the Pacific Ocean (11°00′S 163°00′E) east south east of San Cristobal Island by Japanese aircraft. All 136 crew were rescued by USS PT-146 and USS PT-147 (both United States Navy). She was scuttled by USS PT-147 (United States Navy).
Oost-Vlaanderen	Germany	World War II: The ship (421 GRT, 1921) was en route from Saint Malo to Guernsey when it was attacked by the Royal Air Force and damaged 1.5 miles (2.4 km) from St Peter Port harbour, Guernsey Channel Islands (49°26′S 02°30′W)
USS PT-165	United States Navy	World War II: The Elco 80' PT boat was scuttled as a result of damage from the torpedoing and sinking of tanker Stanvac Manila (Panama) that the PT boat was being carried on as deck cargo.
USS PT-173	United States Navy	World War II: The Elco 80' PT boat was scuttled as a result of damage from the torpedoing and sinking of tanker Stanvac Manila (Panama) that the PT boat was being carried on as deck cargo.
Stanvac Manila	Panama	World War II: The tanker was torpedoed and sunk in the Pacific Ocean 100 nautical miles (190 km) south of Nouméa, New Caledonia (23°45′S 166°30′E) by I-17 (Imperial Japanese Navy). Eight crew, three gunners and one passenger were killed. Eighty-five men were rescued by USS Preble (United States Navy).
U-752	Kriegsmarine	World War II: The Type VIIC submarine was sunk in the Atlantic Ocean (51°40′N 29°49′W) by a rocket attack from Fairey Swordfish aircraft of 819 Squadron, Fleet Air Arm based on HMS Archer (Royal Navy) with the loss of 29 of her 46 crew.

== 24 May ==
List of shipwrecks: 24 May 1943
Ship	State	Description
Nirvo	Italy	World War II: The cargo ship was bombed and sunk by Allied aircraft at Olbia, Sardinia. She was refloated in 1946, repaired and returned to service.
Shinko Maru	Japan	World War II: The cargo ship was sunk in an air attack at Rabaul, New Guinea.
Tana	Germany	World War II: The cargo ship (5,535 GRT, 1921) was bombed and sunk off Olbia, Sardinia, Italy by Allied aircraft. She was raised in 1946 but sank whilst under tow to Genoa.

== 25 May ==
List of shipwrecks: 25 May 1943
Ship	State	Description
Groppo	Regia Marina	World War II: The Ciclone-class torpedo boat was bombed and sunk at Messina, Sicily by United States Army Air Force aircraft. There was no casualty aboard.
Haneström V av Göta	Sweden	World War II: The cargo ship was sunk by a mine off Warnemünde, Germany. Two crew were killed. She was raised three months later and repaired.
MO-016	Soviet Navy	World War II: The MO-4-class patrol vessel was sunk by artillery off Malaya Zemlya.
Sperrbrecher 173 (Westland)	Kriegsmarine	World War II: The Sperrbrecher (1,258 GRT, 1926) struck a mine in the North Sea off Ameland, Friesland, Netherlands and was beached.
U-414	Kriegsmarine	World War II: The Type VIIC submarine was depth charged and sunk in the Mediterranean Sea north west of Ténès, Algeria (36°31′N 0°40′E) by HMS Vetch (Royal Navy) with the loss of all 47 crew.
U-467	Kriegsmarine	World War II: The Type VIIC submarine was depth charged and sunk in the Atlantic Ocean south east of Iceland (62°25′N 14°52′W) by a Consolidated PBY Catalina aircraft of the United States Navy with the loss of all 46 crew.

== 26 May ==
List of shipwrecks: 26 May 1943
Ship	State	Description
HMS Hong Lam	Royal Navy	The auxiliary minelayer/naval trawler (104 GRT, 1928) foundered due to a leak in the engine room off Adam's Bridge between India and Ceylon. The whole crew survived.
Ismail	Romania	World War II: The passenger river ship was sunk by a mine at km 72 of the Danube, between Brăila and Vâlcov, Romania. Five passengers were killed.
Kagi Maru	Japan	World War II: The cargo ship (2,341 GRT) was torpedoed and sunk in the Pacific Ocean west of Kyushu by USS Saury (United States Navy). 29 crew were killed.
Krasnogvardeets	Soviet Navy	World War II: The auxiliary river gunboat was sunk by a mine near Bezymyanny Island on the Volga River. 11 people were killed, and 11 were injured, 1 of them later died of his wounds.
Monte Santo	Italy	World War II: The cargo was bombed and sunk by Lockheed P-38 Lightning aircraft of the United States Army Air Force at La Maddalena, Italy. There was no casualty aboard.
Shoei Maru	Japan	World War II: The auxiliary gunboat (3,580 GRT) was torpedoed and sunk off Guam by USS Whale (United States Navy) with the loss of one crewman.
Tainan Maru	Japan	World War II: The cargo ship was torpedoed and sunk in the Pacific Ocean off the coast of Japan by USS Pogy (United States Navy). 27 crew were killed.
U-436	Kriegsmarine	World War II: The Type VIIC submarine was depth charged and sunk in the Atlantic Ocean west of Cape Ortegal, Spain (43°49′N 15°56′W) by HMS Hyderabad and HMS Test (both Royal Navy) with the loss of all 47 crew.

== 27 May ==
List of shipwrecks: 27 May 1943
Ship	State	Description
F 328	Kriegsmarine	World War II: The Type A Marinefahrprahm was sunk by Soviet bombers east of Scheljesny-Rog, Kuban (45°05′N 36°45′E). There were 6 wounded. She was salvaged by the Soviets in 1944 and put in service as BDB-1 (Soviet Navy).
Kochi Maru	Imperial Japanese Army	World War II: Convoy K-519:The Kochi Maru class auxiliary transport ship was torpedoed and sunk in the Pacific Ocean 75 nms north west of Palau (08°28′N 134°06′E) by USS Finback (United States Navy). Two passengers, 3 gunners and 39 crewmen are killed.
Léopard	Free French Naval Forces	The Chacal-class destroyer ran aground and was wrecked off Tobruk, Libya.
Mihai Viteazu	Romania	World War II: The passenger river ship was sunk by a mine at km 49 of the Danube, near Isaccea, Romania. There were 50 dead or wounded.
O. Re-35	Kriegsmarine	World War II: The auxiliary patrol boat was sunk by a mine in the Baltic Sea.
S-507	Kriegsmarine	The S 501-class motor torpedo boat was sunk in a collision in the Black Sea off Feodosia.
Sicilia	Sweden	World War II: The cargo ship was captured in the Indian Ocean (24°31′S 35°12′E) by U-181 (Kriegsmarine). The 23 crew were ordered to abandon ship, after which she was scuttled.

== 28 May ==
List of shipwrecks: 28 May 1943
Ship	State	Description
Agwimonte	United States	World War II: Convoy CD 20: The Type C1 cargo ship was torpedoed and sunk in the South Atlantic (34°57′S 19°33′E) by U-177 (Kriegsmarine). All 69 crew were rescued by HMSAS Vereeniging (South African Navy) and a South African Army rescue boat.
Akatsuki Maru	Imperial Japanese Navy	World War II: The auxiliary oiler was torpedoed and sunk in the Pacific Ocean west of Kyushu (27°40′S 125°55′E) by USS Saury (United States Navy). Thirty-five crewmen were killed.
Angelo Bassini	Regia Marina	World War II: The torpedo boat was bombed and sunk at Livorno by American aircraft. There was no casualties among her crew.
Antares	Regia Marina	World War II: The Spica-class torpedo boat was bombed and heavily damaged at Livorno by American aircraft. She was grounded to avoid sinking and was never repaired. There was no casualty.
Caralis D8	Regia Marina	World War II: The armed merchant cruiser was bombed and sunk at Livorno by American aircraft.
FR 52	Regia Marina	World War II: The Élan-class sloop was sunk at Livorno by Allied aircraft. Raised by the Germans, renamed SG 22.
Florida	United States	World War II: Convoy BT 14: The cargo ship was torpedoed and damaged in the Atlantic Ocean 125 nautical miles (232 km) east of Fortaleza, Brazil (3°56′S 36°43′W) by U-154 (Kriegsmarine). Her back broken, she was abandoned by her 69 crew, who were rescued by USS PC-592 (United States Navy). Florida was taken in tow by USS Saucy (United States Navy). She was later repaired and returned to service.
Gimma	Italy	World War II: The cargo ship was bombed and sunk at Livorno by American aircraft.
John Worthington	United States	World War II: Convoy BT 14: The tanker was torpedoed and damaged in the Atlantic Ocean 125 nautical miles (232 km) east of Fortaleza (3°52′S 36°48′W) by U-154 (Kriegsmarine). She put in to Trinidad and was subsequently taken to Galveston, Texas. The ship was declared a constructive total loss and was not repaired She was scrapped in 1944.
Kamikawa Maru	Imperial Japanese Navy	World War II: The Kamikawa Maru-class seaplane tender was torpedoed and damaged in the Pacific Ocean 225 miles north north west of Kavieng, New Ireland (01°36′S 150°24′E) by USS Scamp (United States Navy) She was finished off by USS Scamp in the early hours of the next day. Thirty-nine crewmen and three Imperial Japanese Army civilian employees were killed.
Kriti	Romania	World War II: The lighter was sunk by a mine in the Black Sea.
Lercara	Italy	World War II: The cargo ship was bombed and sunk at Livorno by United States Army Air Force aircraft. She was refloated in 1946, repaired and returned to French service as Chef Mécanicien Armand Blanc.
Nirva	Italy	World War II: The cargo ship was bombed and sunk at Livorno by American aircraft.
Polluce	Italy	World War II: The cargo ship was bombed and sunk at Livorno by American aircraft.
Seiki Maru	Japan	World War II: The cargo ship was torpedoed and sunk in the Pacific Ocean off the Aleutian Islands, Alaska, United States by USS S-41 (United States Navy).
Storaas	Norway	World War II: Convoy CD 20: The tanker (7,886 GRT, 1929) was torpedoed and sunk in the Indian Ocean (34°57′S 19°33′E) by U-177 (Kriegsmarine) with the loss of three of her 45 crew. Survivors were rescued by HMSAS Vereeniging (South African Navy).
Tiziano	Italy	World War II: The cargo ship was bombed and sunk at Livorno by American aircraft.
U-304	Kriegsmarine	World War II: The Type VIIC submarine was depth charged and sunk in the Atlantic Ocean south east of Cape Farewell, Greenland by a Consolidated B-24 Liberator aircraft of 120 Squadron Royal Air Force with the loss of all 46 crew.
U-755	Kriegsmarine	World War II: The Type VIIC submarine was attacked with rockets and sunk in the Mediterranean Sea north of Mallorca, Spain (39°58′N 1°41′E) by a Lockheed Hudson aircraft of 608 Squadron, Royal Air Force with the loss of 40 of her 49 crew.

== 29 May ==
List of shipwrecks: 29 May 1943
Ship	State	Description
Eisho Maru	Japan	World War II: The cargo ship was torpedoed and sunk in the Pacific Ocean (17°35′N 110°45′E) by USS Tambor (United States Navy).
Gondul	Sweden	World War II: The cargo ship (5,943 GRT) (1,259 GRT) struck a mine and sank in the Baltic Sea off Wismar, Germany. The whole crew was saved.
Hopetarn	United Kingdom	World War II: The cargo ship (5,231 GRT, 1939) was torpedoed and sunk in the Indian Ocean (30°50′S 39°32′E) by U-198 (Kriegsmarine) with the loss of seven of her 44 crew. One survivor was taken aboard U-198 as a prisoner of war, the rest were rescued by Nirvana (United Kingdom). She was on a voyage from Calcutta, India to a British port.
HM MGB 110	Royal Navy	World War II: The BPB 72' motor gun boat (37/46 t, 1942) was sunk by Kriegsmarine warships off Dunkirk with the loss of 11 crew.
Shoko Maru	Japan	World War II: Convoy No. 266: The cargo ship (5,385 GRT 1940) (a.k.a. Matsue Maru) was torpedoed and sunk in the East China Sea (29°50′N 129°35′E) by USS Saury (United States Navy). All aboard (57 crewmen and four watchmen) were killed.

== 30 May ==
List of shipwrecks: 30 May 1943
Ship	State	Description
Enna	Italy	World War II: The cargo ship was attacked and sunk at Naples by British aircraft. She was refloated in 1947 and scrapped.
Flora MacDonald	United States	World War II: The Liberty ship was torpedoed and damaged in the Atlantic Ocean (7°15′N 13°20′W) by U-126 (Kriegsmarine) with the loss of seven of her 70 crew. She arrived afire at Freetown, Sierra Leone on 6 June and was declared a constructive total loss.
Hakozaki Maru	Japan	World War II: The cargo ship struck a mine and sank off Shanghai, China.
USS LCT-28	United States Navy	World War II: The LCT Mk 5 struck a mine and sank in the Mediterranean Sea.
Llancarfan	United Kingdom	World War II: The cargo ship (4,910 GRT, 1937) was bombed and sunk by Axis aircraft 2 nautical miles (3.7 km) south of Cape St. Vincent. All 49 crew survived. She was on a voyage from Glasgow to Lisbon and Malta with coal and coke.
Netty	Germany	World War II: The tugboat was bombed and sunk in the Black sea by a Soviet Naval Air Force Douglas A-20 Havoc aircraft.
Takamisan Maru	Imperial Japanese Army	World War II: Convoy SA-25: The Takamisan Maru-class auxiliary transport ship was either torpedoed and sunk by USS Saury (United States Navy), or by a US mine, off the mouth of Yangtze River (31°20′N 122°39′E). Survivors were rescued by Kaii (Imperial Japanese Navy).
Toni II	Germany	World War II: The damaged cargo ship was set afire in an Allied air raid on Naples, Italy and was burnt out.
HMS Untamed	Royal Navy	The U-class submarine sank in the Firth of Clyde with the loss of all 35 crew. She was raised on 5 July, repaired and re-entered service as HMS Vitality.
U-418	Kriegsmarine	World War II: The Type VIIC submarine (1,070 GRT) was sunk south-west of Brest, France, (47°00′N 14°00′W) by depth charges from a British Catalina aircraft of 210 Squadron, Royal Air Force with the loss of all 48 crew.

== 31 May ==
List of shipwrecks: 31 May 1943
Ship	State	Description
Athene	United States	The trawler sank in the upper Florida Keys.
U-440	Kriegsmarine	World War II: The Type VIIC submarine was depth charged and sunk in the Atlantic Ocean west of Cape Ortegal, Spain (45°38′N 13°04′W) by a Short Sunderland aircraft of 201 Squadron, Royal Air Force with the loss of all 46 crew.
U-563	Kriegsmarine	World War II: The Type VIIC submarine was depth charged and sunk in the Bay of Biscay (46°35′N 10°40′W) by Handley Page Halifax and Short Sunderland aircraft of 10 Squadron, Royal Australian Air Force, and 58 and 228 Squadrons, Royal Air Force with the loss of all 49 crew.

== Unknown date ==
List of shipwrecks: Unknown date 1943
Ship	State	Description
Calypso	Kriegsmarine	World War II: The Circé-class submarine was either scuttled as a blockship or sunk by Allied bombing at a North African port between 9 and 13 May.
Fracas	French Navy	World War II: The Clameur-class minesweeping tug was scuttled sometime in May.
Gorgo	Regia Marina	World War II: The Flutto-class submarine was lost for an unknown reason in the western Mediterranean Sea between 15 and 31 May with all 48 hands. The depth charge attack off Oran, Algeria by USS Nields (United States Navy) on 21 May that has long been considered to have sunk her was probably against a German submarine.
Hermes	Germany	World War II: The cargo ship was either scuttled as a blockship or sunk by Allied bombing at a North African port between 9 and 13 May.
Nautilus	Kriegsmarine	World War II: The Saphir-class submarine was either scuttled as a blockship or sunk by Allied bombing at a North African port between 9 and 13 May.
Ste. Monique	Vichy France	World War II: The cargo ship was sunk as a blockship at Bizerta, Algeria.
Turquoise	Kriegsmarine	World War II: The Saphir-class submarine was either scuttled as a blockship or sunk by Allied bombing at a North African port between 9 and 13 May.
Unnamed motor torpedo boats	Kriegsmarine	Both un-named Kleinst 42 Type torpedo motor boats (midget MTBs) built were lost sometime in May.
U-209	Kriegsmarine	World War II: The Type VIIC submarine was attacked and damaged on 4 May by a Consolidated PBY Catalina aircraft of the Royal Canadian Air Force. She was subsequently lost on or about 7 May, possibly due to damaged received, with the loss of all 46 crew.
U-381	Kriegsmarine	World War II: The Type VIIC submarine disappeared on patrol in the Atlantic Ocean south of Greenland sometime between 9 and 21 May with the loss of all 47 crew.
