= K232 =

K232 or K-232 may refer to:

- K-232 (Kansas highway), a state highway in Kansas
- HMS Tay (K232), a former UK Royal Navy ship
