= German submarine U-657 =

German World War II submarine

History

Nazi Germany
- Name: U-657
- Ordered: 9 October 1939
- Builder: Howaldtswerke, Hamburg
- Yard number: 806
- Laid down: 5 October 1940
- Launched: 12 August 1941
- Commissioned: 8 October 1941
- Fate: Sunk on 17 May 1943

General characteristics
- Class & type: Type VIIC submarine
- Displacement: 769 tonnes (757 long tons) surfaced; 871 t (857 long tons) submerged
- Length: 67.10 m (220 ft 2 in) o/a; 50.50 m (165 ft 8 in) pressure hull
- Beam: 6.20 m (20 ft 4 in) o/a; 4.70 m (15 ft 5 in) pressure hull
- Draught: 4.74 m (15 ft 7 in)
- Installed power: 2,800–3,200 PS (2,100–2,400 kW; 2,800–3,200 bhp) (diesels); 750 PS (550 kW; 740 shp) (electric)
- Propulsion: 2 shafts; 2 × diesel engines; 2 × electric motors
- Speed: 17.7 knots (32.8 km/h; 20.4 mph) surfaced; 7.6 knots (14.1 km/h; 8.7 mph) submerged
- Range: 8,500 nmi (15,700 km; 9,800 mi) at 10 knots (19 km/h; 12 mph) surfaced; 80 nmi (150 km; 92 mi) at 4 knots (7.4 km/h; 4.6 mph) submerged
- Test depth: 230 m (750 ft); Crush depth: 250–295 m (820–968 ft)
- Complement: 4 officers, 40–56 enlisted
- Armament: 5 × 53.3 cm (21 in) torpedo tubes (four bow, one stern); 14 × torpedoes; 1 × 8.8 cm (3.46 in) deck gun (220 rounds); 1 x 2 cm (0.79 in) C/30 AA gun

Service record
- Part of: 8th U-boat Flotilla; 8 October 1941 – 28 February 1942; 3rd U-boat Flotilla; 1 March – 30 June 1942; 11th U-boat Flotilla; 1 July 1942 – 17 May 1943
- Identification codes: M 38 963
- Commanders: Oblt.z.S. Hans-Jürgen Radke; 8 October – 14 December 1941; K.Kapt. Heinrich Göllnitz; 20 December 1941 – 17 May 1943
- Operations: 7 patrols: 1st patrol: 26 March – 11 April 1942; 2nd patrol: 17 June – 9 July 1942; 3rd patrol: a. 23 July – 16 August 1942; b. 17 – 20 August 1942; c. 22 – 27 August 1942; d. 4 November 1942; e. 12 – 13 November 1942; f. 14 – 15 November 1942; g. 18 – 21 November 1942; 4th patrol: a. 22 November – 25 December 1942; b. 20 – 21 January 1943; 5th patrol: 23 January – 14 February 1943; 6th patrol: a. 15 February – 15 March 1943; b. 16 – 19 March 1943; c. 24 – 28 April 1943; 7th patrol: 4 – 17 May 1943
- Victories: 1 merchant ship sunk (5,196 GRT)

German submarine U-657 was a Type VIIC U-boat built for Nazi Germany's Kriegsmarine for service during World War II. She was laid down on 5 October 1940 by Howaldtswerke, Hamburg as yard number 806, launched on 12 August 1941 and commissioned on 8 October 1941 under Oberleutnant zur See Hans-Jürgen Radke.

Radke was killed in a fire while the boat was undergoing trials on 14 December 1941.

== Design ==
German Type VIIC submarines were preceded by the shorter Type VIIB submarines. U-657 had a displacement of 769 tonnes (757 long tons) when at the surface and 871 tonnes (857 long tons) while submerged. She had a total length of 67.10 m (220 ft 2 in), a pressure hull length of 50.50 m (165 ft 8 in), a beam of 6.20 m (20 ft 4 in), a height of 9.60 m (31 ft 6 in), and a draught of 4.74 m (15 ft 7 in). The submarine was powered by two Germaniawerft F46 four-stroke, six-cylinder supercharged diesel engines producing a total of 2,800 to 3,200 metric horsepower (2,060 to 2,350 kW; 2,760 to 3,160 shp) for use while surfaced, two Siemens-Schuckert GU 343/38–8 double-acting electric motors producing a total of 750 metric horsepower (550 kW; 740 shp) for use while submerged. She had two shafts and two 1.23 m (4 ft) propellers. The boat was capable of operating at depths of up to 230 metres (750 ft).

The submarine had a maximum surface speed of 17.7 knots (32.8 km/h; 20.4 mph) and a maximum submerged speed of 7.6 knots (14.1 km/h; 8.7 mph). When submerged, the boat could operate for 80 nautical miles (150 km; 92 mi) at 4 knots (7.4 km/h; 4.6 mph); when surfaced, she could travel 8,500 nautical miles (15,700 km; 9,800 mi) at 10 knots (19 km/h; 12 mph). U-657 was fitted with five 53.3 cm (21 in) torpedo tubes (four fitted at the bow and one at the stern), fourteen torpedoes, one 8.8 cm (3.46 in) SK C/35 naval gun, 220 rounds, and a 2 cm (0.79 in) C/30 anti-aircraft gun. The boat had a complement of between forty-four and sixty.

== Service history ==
The boat's career began with training at 8th U-boat Flotilla on 8 October 1941, followed by active service on 1 March 1942 as part of the 3rd Flotilla in La Pallice, France. Four months later, she transferred to 11th Flotilla, in Bergen, Norway, for the remainder of her service.

In seven patrols she sank one merchant ship, for a total of 5,196 gross register tons (GRT).

=== Wolfpacks ===
U-657 took part in six wolfpacks, namely:

- Naseweis (31 March – 10 April 1942)
- Eisteufel (21 June – 8 July 1942)
- Nebelkönig (27 July – 14 August 1942)
- Nordwind (24 January – 4 February 1943)
- Iller (12 – 15 May 1943)
- Donau 1 (15 – 17 May 1943)

=== Fate ===
U-657 was sunk on 17 May 1943 in the North Atlantic, E of Cape Farewell, Greenland, in position 58°54′N 42°33′W, by depth charges from Royal Navy frigate HMS Swale. All hands were lost.

== Summary of raiding history ==
Date	Ship Name	Nationality	Tonnage (GRT)	Fate
17 May 1943	Aymeric	United Kingdom	5,196	Sunk

== Bibliography ==
- Busch, Rainer; Röll, Hans-Joachim (1999). German U-boat commanders of World War II : a biographical dictionary. Translated by Brooks, Geoffrey. London, Annapolis, Md: Greenhill Books, Naval Institute Press. ISBN 1-55750-186-6.
- Busch, Rainer; Röll, Hans-Joachim (1999). Der U-Boot-Krieg, 1939-1945: Deutsche U-Boot-Verluste von September 1939 bis Mai 1945 [German U-boat losses from September 1939 to May 1945] (in German). Vol. IV. Hamburg, Berlin, Bonn: Mittler. ISBN 3-8132-0514-2.
- Gröner, Eric; Jung, Dieter; Maass, Martin (1991). German Warships 1815-1945: U-boats and Mine Warfare Vessels. Vol. 2. Translated by Thomas, Keith; Magowan, Rachel. London: Conway Maritime Press. ISBN 0-85177-593-4.
- Sharpe, Peter (1998). U-Boat Fact File. Great Britain: Midland Publishing. ISBN 1-85780-072-9.
