= German submarine U-266 =

German World War II submarine

History

Nazi Germany
- Name: U-266
- Ordered: 15 August 1940
- Builder: Bremer-Vulkan-Vegesacker Werft, Bremen
- Yard number: 31
- Laid down: 1 August 1941
- Launched: 11 May 1942
- Commissioned: 24 June 1942
- Fate: Sunk, 15 May 1943

General characteristics
- Class & type: Type VIIC submarine
- Displacement: 769 tonnes (757 long tons) surfaced; 871 t (857 long tons) submerged
- Length: 67.10 m (220 ft 2 in) o/a; 50.50 m (165 ft 8 in) pressure hull
- Beam: 6.20 m (20 ft 4 in) o/a; 4.70 m (15 ft 5 in) pressure hull
- Height: 9.60 m (31 ft 6 in)
- Draught: 4.74 m (15 ft 7 in)
- Installed power: 2,800–3,200 PS (2,100–2,400 kW; 2,800–3,200 bhp) (diesels); 750 PS (550 kW; 740 shp) (electric)
- Propulsion: 2 shafts; 2 × diesel engines; 2 × electric motors
- Speed: 17.7 knots (32.8 km/h; 20.4 mph) surfaced; 7.6 knots (14.1 km/h; 8.7 mph) submerged
- Range: 8,500 nmi (15,700 km; 9,800 mi) at 10 knots (19 km/h; 12 mph) surfaced; 80 nmi (150 km; 92 mi) at 4 knots (7.4 km/h; 4.6 mph) submerged
- Test depth: 230 m (750 ft); Crush depth: 250–295 m (820–968 ft)
- Complement: 4 officers, 40–56 enlisted
- Armament: 5 × 53.3 cm (21 in) torpedo tubes (four bow, one stern); 14 × torpedoes or 26 TMA mines; 1 × 8.8 cm (3.46 in) deck gun (220 rounds); 1 × twin 2 cm (0.79 in) C/30 anti-aircraft guns

Service record
- Part of: 8th U-boat Flotilla; 24 June – 31 December 1942; 7th U-boat Flotilla; 1 January – 15 May 1943
- Identification codes: M 05 834
- Commanders: Oblt.z.S. Hannes Leinemann; 24 June – 11 September 1942; Kptlt. Ralf von Jessen; 12 September 1942 – 15 May 1943
- Operations: 2 patrols: 1st patrol: 22 December 1942 – 17 February 1943; 2nd patrol: 14 April – 15 May 1943
- Victories: 4 merchant ships sunk (16,089 GRT)

German submarine U-266 was a Type VIIC U-boat of Nazi Germany's Kriegsmarine during World War II. The submarine was laid down on 1 August 1941 at Bremer-Vulkan-Vegesacker Werft in Bremen as yard number 31. She was launched on 11 May 1942 and commissioned on 24 June under the command of Oberleutnant zur See Hannes Leinemann.

In two patrols, she sank four ships of 16,089 gross register tons (GRT). She was a member of five wolfpacks.

She was sunk on 15 May 1943 in mid-Atlantic by a British aircraft.

== Design ==
German Type VIIC submarines were preceded by the shorter Type VIIB submarines. U-266 had a displacement of 769 tonnes (757 long tons) when at the surface and 871 tonnes (857 long tons) while submerged. She had a total length of 67.10 m (220 ft 2 in), a pressure hull length of 50.50 m (165 ft 8 in), a beam of 6.20 m (20 ft 4 in), a height of 9.60 m (31 ft 6 in), and a draught of 4.74 m (15 ft 7 in). The submarine was powered by two Germaniawerft F46 four-stroke, six-cylinder supercharged diesel engines producing a total of 2,800 to 3,200 metric horsepower (2,060 to 2,350 kW; 2,760 to 3,160 shp) for use while surfaced, two AEG GU 460/8–27 double-acting electric motors producing a total of 750 metric horsepower (550 kW; 740 shp) for use while submerged. She had two shafts and two 1.23 m (4 ft) propellers. The boat was capable of operating at depths of up to 230 metres (750 ft).

The submarine had a maximum surface speed of 17.7 knots (32.8 km/h; 20.4 mph) and a maximum submerged speed of 7.6 knots (14.1 km/h; 8.7 mph). When submerged, the boat could operate for 80 nautical miles (150 km; 92 mi) at 4 knots (7.4 km/h; 4.6 mph); when surfaced, she could travel 8,500 nautical miles (15,700 km; 9,800 mi) at 10 knots (19 km/h; 12 mph). U-266 was fitted with five 53.3 cm (21 in) torpedo tubes (four fitted at the bow and one at the stern), fourteen torpedoes, one 8.8 cm (3.46 in) SK C/35 naval gun, 220 rounds, and one twin 2 cm (0.79 in) C/30 anti-aircraft gun. The boat had a complement of between forty-four and sixty.

== Service history ==
After training with the 8th U-boat Flotilla, the boat became operational on 1 January 1943 when she was transferred to the 7th flotilla.

=== First patrol ===
U-266's first patrol began when she departed Kiel on 22 December 1942. She entered the Atlantic Ocean after negotiating the gap between Iceland and the Faroe Islands. She sank Polyktor on 6 February 1943. She then docked at the French Atlantic port of St. Nazaire on the 17th.

=== Second patrol and loss ===
The boat departed St. Nazaire on 14 March 1943 for the mid-Atlantic once more. On 5 May, she sank Bonde, Gharinda and Selvistan.

The boat was sunk on 15 May by a British Handley Page Halifax of No. 58 Squadron RAF. Forty-seven men died; there were no survivors.

=== Previously recorded fate ===
U-266 had been thought to have been sunk on 14 May 1943 by a British B-24 Liberator of 86 squadron.

=== Wolfpacks ===
U-266 took part in five wolfpacks, namely:

- Jaguar (10 – 27 January 1943)
- Pfeil (4 – 9 February 1943)
- Amsel (22 April – 3 May 1943)
- Amsel 2 (3 – 6 May 1943)
- Elbe (7 May 1943)

== Summary of raiding history ==
Date	Ship Name	Nationality	Tonnage (GRT)	Fate
6 February 1943	Polyktor	Greece	4,077	Sunk
5 May 1943	Bonde	Norway	1,570	Sunk
5 May 1943	Gharinda	United Kingdom	5,306	Sunk
5 May 1943	Selvistan	United Kingdom	5,136	Sunk

== Bibliography ==
- Busch, Rainer; Röll, Hans-Joachim (1999). German U-boat commanders of World War II : a biographical dictionary. Translated by Brooks, Geoffrey. London, Annapolis, Md: Greenhill Books, Naval Institute Press. ISBN 1-55750-186-6.
- Busch, Rainer; Röll, Hans-Joachim (1999). Der U-Boot-Krieg, 1939-1945: Deutsche U-Boot-Verluste von September 1939 bis Mai 1945 [German U-boat losses from September 1939 to May 1945] (in German). Vol. IV. Hamburg, Berlin, Bonn: Mittler. ISBN 3-8132-0514-2.
- Edwards, Bernard (1996). Dönitz and the Wolf Packs – The U-boats at War. Cassell Military Classics. pp. 146, 199. ISBN 0-304-35203-9.
- Gröner, Erich; Jung, Dieter; Maass, Martin (1991). U-boats and Mine Warfare Vessels. German Warships 1815–1945. Vol. 2. Translated by Thomas, Keith; Magowan, Rachel. London: Conway Maritime Press. ISBN 0-85177-593-4.
