= German submarine U-707 =

German World War II submarine

History

Nazi Germany
- Name: U-707
- Ordered: 6 August 1940
- Builder: H. C. Stülcken Sohn, Hamburg
- Yard number: 771
- Laid down: 2 January 1941
- Launched: 18 December 1941
- Commissioned: 1 July 1942
- Fate: Sunk on 9 November 1943

General characteristics
- Class & type: Type VIIC submarine
- Displacement: 769 tonnes (757 long tons) surfaced; 871 t (857 long tons) submerged
- Length: 67.10 m (220 ft 2 in) o/a; 50.50 m (165 ft 8 in) pressure hull
- Beam: 6.20 m (20 ft 4 in) o/a; 4.70 m (15 ft 5 in) pressure hull
- Height: 9.60 m (31 ft 6 in)
- Draught: 4.74 m (15 ft 7 in)
- Installed power: 2 × supercharged Germaniawerft 6 cylinder, four-stroke F46 diesel engines; 2 × double-acting electric motors
- Propulsion: 2 × shafts; 2 × 1.23 m (4 ft 0 in) propellers
- Speed: 17.7 knots (32.8 km/h; 20.4 mph) surfaced; 7.6 knots (14.1 km/h; 8.7 mph) submerged
- Range: 8,500 nautical miles (15,700 km; 9,800 mi) at 10 knots (19 km/h; 12 mph)
- Test depth: 230 m (750 ft); Crush depth: 250–295 m (820–968 ft)
- Complement: 44–60 officers & ratings
- Armament: 5 × 53.3 cm (21 in) torpedo tubes (four bow, one stern); 14 × torpedoes; 1 × 8.8 cm (3.46 in) deck gun (220 rounds); 1 × twin 2 cm (0.79 in) C/30 anti-aircraft guns

Service record
- Part of: 8th U-boat Flotilla; 1 July – 8 December 1942; 7th U-boat Flotilla; 9 December 1942 – 9 November 1943
- Identification codes: M 45 325
- Commanders: Oblt.z.S. Günter Gretschel; 1 July 1942 – 9 November 1943
- Operations: 3 patrols: 1st patrol: 12 January – 8 March 1943; 2nd patrol: a. 12 April – 31 May 1943; b. 12 – 13 October 1943; 3rd patrol: 19 October – 9 November 1943
- Victories: 2 merchant ships sunk (11,811 GRT)

German submarine U-707 was a Type VIIC U-boat of Nazi Germany's Kriegsmarine during World War II.

Ordered 6 August 1940, she was laid down 2 January 1941 and launched 18 December 1941. She had a relatively brief career from 1 July 1942 until 9 November 1943, and during this time she was commanded by Oberleutnant zur See Günther Gretschel.

== Design ==
German Type VIIC submarines were preceded by the shorter Type VIIB submarines. U-707 had a displacement of 769 tonnes (757 long tons) when at the surface and 871 tonnes (857 long tons) while submerged. She had a total length of 67.10 m (220 ft 2 in), a pressure hull length of 50.50 m (165 ft 8 in), a beam of 6.20 m (20 ft 4 in), a height of 9.60 m (31 ft 6 in), and a draught of 4.74 m (15 ft 7 in). The submarine was powered by two Germaniawerft F46 four-stroke, six-cylinder supercharged diesel engines producing a total of 2,800 to 3,200 metric horsepower (2,060 to 2,350 kW; 2,760 to 3,160 shp) for use while surfaced, two Garbe, Lahmeyer & Co. RP 137/c double-acting electric motors producing a total of 750 metric horsepower (550 kW; 740 shp) for use while submerged. She had two shafts and two 1.23 m (4 ft) propellers. The boat was capable of operating at depths of up to 230 metres (750 ft).

The submarine had a maximum surface speed of 17.7 knots (32.8 km/h; 20.4 mph) and a maximum submerged speed of 7.6 knots (14.1 km/h; 8.7 mph). When submerged, the boat could operate for 80 nautical miles (150 km; 92 mi) at 4 knots (7.4 km/h; 4.6 mph); when surfaced, she could travel 8,500 nautical miles (15,700 km; 9,800 mi) at 10 knots (19 km/h; 12 mph). U-707 was fitted with five 53.3 cm (21 in) torpedo tubes (four fitted at the bow and one at the stern), fourteen torpedoes, one 8.8 cm (3.46 in) SK C/35 naval gun, 220 rounds, and one twin 2 cm (0.79 in) C/30 anti-aircraft gun. The boat had a complement of between forty-four and sixty.

== Patrol History ==
During her career, U-707 sunk two ships, for a total tonnage of 11,811 GRT, namely the US freighter Jonathan Sturges, a straggler of convoy ON 166, and the British freighter North Britain also a straggler of convoy ONS 5.

=== Wolfpacks ===
U-707 participated in nine wolfpacks, namely:

- Haudegen (26 January – 2 February 1943)
- Nordsturm (2 – 9 February 1943)
- Haudegen (9 – 15 February 1943)
- Taifun (15 – 20 February 1943)
- Specht (19 April – 4 May 1943)
- Fink (4 – 6 May 1943)
- Naab (12 – 15 May 1943)
- Donau 2 (15 – 26 May 1943)
- Schill (25 October – 9 November 1943)

=== Fate ===
While on patrol east of the Azores, she was depth charged and sunk on 9 November 1943 from a RAF Fortress aircraft, from Sqdn. 220/J R.A.F, at position 40°31′N 20°17′W. She was lost with all hands; 51 dead.

== Summary of raiding history ==
Date	Ship Name	Nationality	Tonnage (GRT)	Fate
24 February 1943	Jonathan Sturges	United States	7,176	Sunk
5 May 1943	North Britain	United Kingdom	4,635	Sunk

== Bibliography ==
- Busch, Rainer; Röll, Hans-Joachim (1999). German U-boat commanders of World War II : a biographical dictionary. Translated by Brooks, Geoffrey. London, Annapolis, Md: Greenhill Books, Naval Institute Press. ISBN 1-55750-186-6.
- Busch, Rainer; Röll, Hans-Joachim (1999). Der U-Boot-Krieg, 1939-1945: Deutsche U-Boot-Verluste von September 1939 bis Mai 1945 [German U-boat losses from September 1939 to May 1945] (in German). Vol. IV. Hamburg, Berlin, Bonn: Mittler. ISBN 3-8132-0514-2.
- Gröner, Eric; Jung, Dieter; Maass, Martin (1991). German Warships 1815-1945: U-boats and Mine Warfare Vessels. Vol. 2. Translated by Thomas, Keith; Magowan, Rachel. London: Conway Maritime Press. ISBN 0-85177-593-4.
