= USS Saury =

Submarine of the United States

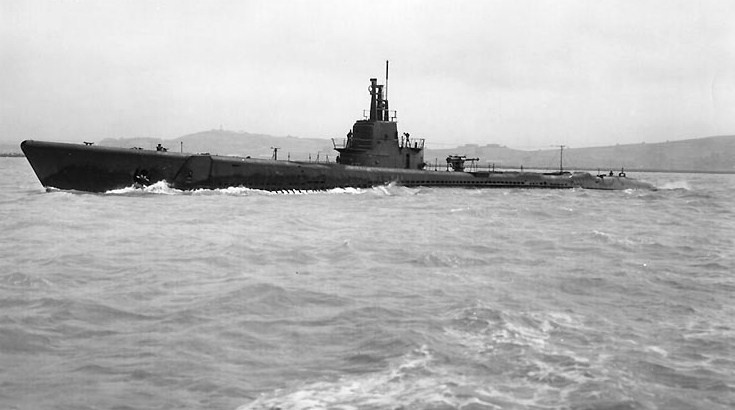
- ]] USS Saury underway off the Mare Island Navy Yard

History

United States
- Builder: Electric Boat Company, Groton, Connecticut
- Laid down: 28 June 1937
- Launched: 20 August 1938
- Commissioned: 3 April 1939
- Decommissioned: 22 June 1946
- Stricken: 19 July 1946
- Fate: Sold for scrap 19 May 1947

General characteristics
- Class & type: Sargo-class composite diesel-hydraulic and diesel-electric submarine
- Displacement: 1,450 long tons (1,470 t) standard, surfaced; 2,350 long tons (2,390 t) submerged
- Length: 310 ft 6 in (94.64 m)
- Beam: 26 ft 10 in (8.18 m)
- Draft: 16 ft 7 1/2 in (5.067 m)
- Propulsion: 4 × Hooven-Owens-Rentschler (H.O.R.) 9-cylinder diesel engines (two hydraulic-drive, two driving electrical generators); 2 × 126-cell Sargo batteries; 4 × high-speed General Electric electric motors with reduction gears; two shafts; 5,500 shp (4.1 MW) surfaced; 2,740 shp (2.0 MW) submerged
- Speed: 21 knots (39 km/h) surfaced; 8.75 knots (16 km/h) submerged
- Range: 11,000 nautical miles (20,000 km) at 10 knots (19 km/h)
- Endurance: 48 hours at 2 knots (3.7 km/h) submerged
- Test depth: 250 ft (76 m)
- Complement: 5 officers, 54 enlisted
- Armament: 8 × 21 inch (533 mm) torpedo tubes; (four forward, four aft); 24 torpedoes; 1 × 3 in (76 mm) / 50 caliber deck gun; four machine guns

USS Saury (SS-189), a Sargo-class submarine, was the only ship of the United States Navy to be named for the saury, a long-beaked relative of the flying fish found in the temperate zones of the Atlantic.

== Construction and commissioning ==
Saury′s keel was laid down on 28 June 1937 by the Electric Boat Company in Groton, Connecticut. She was launched on 20 August 1938, sponsored by Mrs. Mary E. Casbarian, wife of James Paul Casbarian, who headed the U.S. Navy's Ships' Names and Sponsors Office, and commissioned on 3 April 1939.

== Pre-World War II service ==
Following commissioning, Saury conducted tests in the New London, Connecticut, area and as far south as Annapolis, Maryland, before visiting New York City in late April 1939 for the 1939 New York World's Fair. In mid-May 1939, she conducted tests with experimental periscopes, then prepared for her shakedown cruise which, between 26 June and 26 August, took her from Newfoundland to Venezuela and the Panama Canal Zone and back to southern New England. In September, she entered the Portsmouth Navy Yard in Kittery, Maine, for post-shakedown overhaul.

After overhaul and final trials, Saury got underway on 4 December for the West Coast. On 12 December, she transited the Panama Canal and, nine days later, joined Submarine Division (SubDiv) 16 of Submarine Squadron (SubRon) 6, at San Diego, California. Upkeep, exercises, and services as a target for surface units took her through March 1940. In April, she sailed west to participate in Fleet Problem XXI, an eight-phased problem simulating an attack on the defense of the Hawaiian area and the destruction of one fleet prior to the concentration of another.

Based afterward at Pearl Harbor, Saury conducted exercises in the Hawaiian Islands and as far west as Midway Island until she returned to the West Coast in September for overhaul at Mare Island. From March to October 1941, she operated out of both Pearl Harbor and San Diego, California, then departed the former for her new base, Cavite, Philippines.

== First war patrol ==
Assigned to SubDiv 21, SubRon 2, after 1 June 1941, Saury arrived in Manila Bay in mid-November. On 8 December (7 December east of the International Date Line), she got underway for her first war patrol.

Clearing Manila Bay, Saury moved north to search for and intercept ships of the Japanese invasion force. Lack of emergency identification systems and radio problems complicated her job. During the next two weeks, she patrolled near Vigan and along a north–south line at longitude 120 degrees East. Then, on 21 December, she was ordered into Lingayen Gulf in response to a report from submarine Stingray (SS-186) of Japanese forces there.

Prior to dawn on 22 December, she took up patrol duties off San Fernando in the northern approaches to the gulf, and moved south. At 0411, she sighted an enemy destroyer and, at 04:24, she fired. Although the "fish" headed "right at" the destroyer, there was no explosion. At 04:26, a second destroyer appeared; and, the hunter became the hunted. Saury commenced evasive tactics in the relatively shallow waters of the gulf. Depth charges were dropped, but none within 1,000 yards (900 m) of the submarine. Saury continued on evasive courses, working her way to the northwest and out of the destroyer-patrolled area. By noon, she was clear. After dark, she moved back into the gulf, past the enemy patrol line between San Fernando and Cape Bolinao.

At about 02:10 on 23 December, an enemy destroyer sighted Saury. The submarine went to 120 feet (37 m). By 02:16, three depth charges had exploded within 200 yards (200 m). Two more depth charges followed, but Saury escaped and continued to hunt for targets. Early afternoon brought more depth charging, but Saury was not damaged. On 24 December, she sighted a transport, running fast and very close in shore. The submarine was unable to close and attack.

That evening brought a change in orders; and, in preparing to clear the area, Saury found herself between two enemy ships. She headed out "playing tag with enemy destroyers all night". The next evening, she was again closed by an enemy destroyer. She went to 140 feet (43 m) and evaded the enemy's depth charges. On the night of 27–28 December, she interrupted battery charging to avoid a division of enemy destroyers. On 1 January 1942, she sighted an enemy convoy, but was unable to close the range. On 8 January, she received orders to proceed to the Netherlands East Indies.

Moving south, Saury patrolled the Basilan Strait area on 11 and 12 January. By then, Tarakan had fallen and the submarine headed south to patrol the enemy's Davao-Tarakan line. By 16 January, she was 30 miles (50 km) east of the Tarakan lightship; and, on 18 January, she crossed the equator into the southern latitudes.

On 19 January, the Japanese landed at Sandakan in North Borneo, and Saury arrived at Balikpapan to fuel and provision. The next day, the submarine departed, fueled but not provisioned. After patrolling toward Cape William, Sulawesi (Celebes), she took up station in the approaches to Balikpapan.

== Second war patrol ==
On 23 January 1942, as other Allied units moved into Makassar Strait to delay the Japanese, Saury shifted north to the Koetai River Delta (Mahakam) in hopes of impeding enemy shipping moving south to Balikpapan. On the morning of 24 January, she was illuminated, forced to go deep, and was unable to attack.

After the Japanese took Balikpapan, Saury was ordered to patrol off Cape William. On 27 January, she moved toward Java. On 30 January, she met a Dutch patrol vessel off Meinderts Reef, then proceeded through Madura Strait to Surabaya (Soerabaja).

On 9 February, as the Japanese were taking Makassar, Saury departed Surabaya for her second war patrol. The submarine headed east to patrol along the north coasts of the Lesser Soendas. On 13 February, she headed north-northwest for a three-day patrol between Kabaena and Salajar off the Sulawesi coast. From there, she moved southwest to patrol the entrance to Lombok Strait. On the night of 19 and 20 February, she received word of the Japanese landing on Bali; sighted her first enemy ships of the patrol; and commenced 18 hours of submerged evasive tactics to avoid enemy destroyers' depth charges. On 24 February, she shifted northward to an area southeast of Sepandjang Island where she sighted and attacked, unsuccessfully, an enemy convoy.

From 26 February to 8 March, Saury patrolled from Meinderts Reef to Kangean Island, the eastern entrance to Madura Strait. However, the Japanese moved on Surabaya from the north and west. Batavia and Surabaya fell. On 9 March, Saury began making her way to Australia. The submarine arrived at Fremantle on 17 March. Her torpedoes, Mark 14s, had not damaged the enemy.

== Third war patrol ==
On 28 April 1942, Saury cleared Fremantle for her third war patrol, but, three days later, a crack in the after trim tank caused her to return to Australia. On 7 May, she again departed Fremantle and headed north. By 14 May, she was off Timor; and, by 16 May, she was in the Flores Sea, en route to the Banda Sea and the eastern Sulawesi (Celebes) coast. On 18 May, off Wowoni, she fired three torpedoes at an enemy cargo-passenger ship without effect. She remained in the area for two days to intercept enemy traffic to Kendari; then moved north to hunt in Greyhound Strait and the Molucca Passage. On 23 and 24 May, she was off Kema, whence she rounded North Cape to patrol off Manado on the tip of northern Sulawesi.

On 26 May, Saury commenced hunting in the eastern Celebes Sea. On 28 May, she sighted and fired on a merchantman which had been converted into a seaplane carrier, but again was unsuccessful.

On 8 June, the submarine turned south and began retracing her route through the Molucca Passage and Greyhound Strait. From 12 to 14 June, she again patrolled off Kendari. On 15 June, she searched Boeton Passage; then moved into the Flores Sea, whence she headed via Timor for Australia. Saury returned to Fremantle on 28 June.

On 2 July, she sailed for Albany, where tests were to be conducted on the Mark 14 torpedoes. On 18 July, Saury launched four torpedoes at a net 850 to 900 yards (800 m) away. They were set for ten feet. The first passed through an area from which the net had been torn during the night. The other three penetrated the net at 21 feet (6 m).

From 23 to 25 July, Saury escorted submarine tender Holland (AS-3) back to Fremantle, then prepared for her fourth war patrol, which would take her back to the Philippines.

== Fourth war patrol ==
Sailing at the end of the month, Saury transited Lombok Strait on 6 August 1942 and, by 16 August, was running up the Iloilo-Manila sea lane. On 17 August, she investigated Ambulong Strait and Mangarin Bay. On 18 August, she moved up the Mindoro Coast to Cape Calavite, whence she took up station west of Corregidor.

On 20 August, the submarine moved into the presumed enemy convoy route. The next day, she sighted and attempted to close a tanker; then shifted her patrol to a line five miles (8.0 km) off the coast.

On 24 August, the submarine again closed Manila Bay. At 06:45, she sighted masts; but heavy rain soon moved in and obscured the target. At 09:52, she launched two torpedoes. Her periscope began vibrating, hindering visibility and precluding the firing of two more torpedoes. At 09:54, an explosion was heard and the target, a small tanker, was seen to take on a five-degree list to port. Saury proceeded to 200 feet (60 m) to avoid detection by enemy air patrol units. At about 10:47, a bomb exploded close by the submarine. Depth charges followed and, at 11:50 and 11:52, two more bombs exploded.

The hunt for the submarine continued through the afternoon. At 18:10, the sounds of propellers and pinging died out. At 19:21, Saury surfaced, started recharging and headed out to sea on her three available engines. An hour later, she was sighted by an enemy destroyer, which closed in fast. Saury submerged, and her elusive tactics were again successful.

The next night, she sighted another enemy warship, a destroyer or a torpedo boat. The submarine, badly in need of a charge, did not attack. 29 August brought extremely poor weather. On 31 August, she sighted a hospital ship. On 3 September, the day she headed south, the weather began to clear.

On 7 September, Saury received orders to patrol off Makassar City and, while surfaced on the night of 11 September, she sighted a cargoman. At 20:58, she sent three torpedoes at the target. At 21:00, an explosion rocked the target. Flames enveloped the center of the ship. Its superstructure and deck cargo blazed. Eighteen minutes later, the target blew up. Japanese records identified the victim as the 8,606-ton aircraft ferry, Kanto Maru.

On 17 September, Saury cleared Lombok Strait and headed for Exmouth Gulf where she delivered excess fuel to a barge; thence continued on to Fremantle, arriving on 23 September.

== Fifth and sixth war patrols ==
From 24 September to 18 October 1942, she underwent upkeep and repairs. She then shifted to Brisbane, whence she departed on 31 October for her fifth war patrol. Her 27-day patrol was conducted off western and northern New Britain, where she had 27 contacts, was able to develop four, and fired 13 torpedoes, of which only one was a possible hit.

On 21 December, Saury arrived at Pearl Harbor and, on 29 December, she moored at Mare Island. During her ensuing overhaul, she received a bathythermograph and a high periscope.

Saury returned to Pearl Harbor on 16 April 1943 and, on 7 May, she departed for her sixth war patrol which would take her into the East China Sea to operate off the northern Ryukyu Islands and in the coastal waters of Kyūshū. During the patrol, she would also test the effectiveness of the high periscope in daytime attacks and the usefulness of the bathythermograph in locating thermal layers in which to hide.

On 11 May, Saury topped off on fuel and lubricating oil at Midway Island, then continued west. On 19 May, she ran into the edges of a typhoon. On 20 May, "the bottom dropped out of the barometer", but the next day, the storm abated. On 25 May, the submarine entered her assigned area and headed toward Amami Ōshima, a naval base some 200 miles (300 km) south of the industrial port of Kagoshima on southern Kyūshū.

Patrolling to the west of the island, Saury sighted her first enemy maru soon after 09:00 on 26 May; but the ship was too distant to catch. About an hour later, she abandoned the approach; then sighted a five-ship convoy on the port quarter. At 10:30, she fired tubes one, two, and three. One minute and 44 seconds later, a torpedo exploded against the stern of a transport. Nine seconds after that, another hit broke the target's back and sent debris high into the air. The 2,300-ton Kagi Maru went under. At 10:34, Saury went deep. By 10:38, nine depth charges had been dropped, but none was close.

On the afternoon of 28 May, Saury, patrolling on the surface with her high periscope in operation, sighted the masts of a steamer and moved to intercept. Fourteen minutes later, at 16:43, she submerged. At 17:24, she launched four torpedoes at the target, the unescorted, empty, 10,216-ton tanker, Akatsuki Maru. Three missed, one hit. The tanker's speed had been underestimated. The tanker dropped two depth charges. Saury fired six more torpedoes. Four scored and the tanker went under.

In the late afternoon of 29 May, Saury, again on the surface and using the high periscope, sighted smoke about fourteen miles (23 km) off. At 19:13, she submerged and began tracking a convoy of four cargo ships and three tankers. At 20:58, she surfaced and attacked. Japanese records show that she sank Takamisan Maru, 1,992 tons, and Shoko Maru, 5,385 tons.

On 30 May, Saury headed back to Midway Island. On 7 June, her number four main engine went out of commission. The next day, she arrived at Midway; and, on 13 June, she moored at Pearl Harbor for repairs and refit.

== Seventh war patrol ==
A month later, on 13 July 1943, the submarine departed Hawaii on her seventh war patrol. On 21 July, her number four main engine again went out of commission, and remained out for the duration of the patrol. Poor weather then slowed her westward progress still further; and, on the night of 30 July, while halfway between Iwo Jima and Okinawa, she made her first contact of the patrol.

The contact was made by radar at about 22:25. Saury set a course to intercept the targets, two large warships and a destroyer. At 03:03 on 31 July, Saury submerged. At 03:25, she turned to attack; losing, regaining, losing, and then regaining depth control. By then, the targets had passed firing bearing. A few seconds later, at 03:38, the sound operator reported a bearing of 180 degrees relative. Almost simultaneously, the periscope revealed a destroyer with a zero degree angle on the bow. The commanding officer ordered Saury deep. A few seconds later, two jolts shook Saury. She took on a five-degree list to port. She continued to go deeper, then retired to the east. No depth charges were heard. Saury remained at 175 to 200 feet (60 m) all day. At 20:20, she surfaced. Her periscope shears were bent 30 degrees from the vertical to starboard. All equipment mounted therein was damaged. Both periscopes and both radars were out of commission. Saury had been blinded.

Temporary repairs were made; and, at 04:03 on 1 August, Saury headed home, arriving at Midway Island on 8 August and at Pearl Harbor on 12 August. Her patrol had ended before she had reached her assigned area but she was credited with causing damage to an enemy destroyer.

During repair and refit, Saury was given an enlarged conning tower, new periscope shears, and new radar equipment. Her number-four engine was completely overhauled. On 4 October, she was ready for sea.

== Eighth and ninth war patrols ==
On her eighth and ninth war patrols, 4 October to 26 November 1943 and from 21 December 1943 to 14 February 1944, Saury inflicted no damage. Much of the latter patrol was spent in fighting extremely bad weather in the East China Sea, during which proper navigational positions were unobtainable. At the end of that patrol, one day out of Midway, she was swamped by an oversized swell while her hatches were open. The wave overtook Saury from the quarter, pushed her over to a 40-degree list to port; turned her 140 degrees from her course; and sent green water through the conning tower hatch and main induction. Electrical equipment grounded out and small fires were started, but were quickly extinguished. Auxiliary power was restored in half an hour, but repairs to main control required almost a full day, and repairs to the master gyro took even longer.

Saury arrived at Pearl Harbor from Midway Island on 21 February and continued on to Mare Island, where she underwent overhaul and re-engining during March and April. On 16 June, she returned to Pearl Harbor, and on 29 June, she departed on her tenth war patrol.

== Tenth and eleventh war patrols ==
On 3 July 1944, she topped off at Midway Island. On 5 July, a cracked cylinder liner forced her back to Midway for repairs, and, on 6 July, she headed out again. On 11 July, another cylinder liner cracked, but she continued on toward her assigned area, San Bernardino Strait in the Philippines, which she entered on 18 July.

On 4 August, the submarine shifted north in hope of better hunting, and, on 6 August, she sighted an unescorted freighter. However, the glassy sea, unlimited visibility, and enemy, land-based, patrol planes combined against her, and she broke off the attack. Four days later, she departed the area, arriving at Majuro on 23 August.

From 20 September to 29 November 1944, Saury conducted her eleventh and last war patrol. She patrolled in the Nansei Shoto area from 20 September to 4 November, rescuing a downed pilot, but sinking no enemy ships as she hunted in the wake of the fast carrier forces. After stopping at Saipan from 5 to 10 November, she proceeded on the second phase of the patrol, an antipatrol vessel sweep north of the Bonin Islands. Extremely poor weather again interfered, but on 18 November, she damaged a tanker. On 29 November, she returned to Pearl Harbor.

== Fate ==
For the remainder of the war, Saury served in the Hawaiian area as a target and training submarine. On 19 August 1945, she sailed for San Francisco, California, and inactivation. Saury was decommissioned on 22 June 1946, and her name was struck from the Naval Vessel Register on 19 July. She was sold and delivered to the Learner Company of Oakland, California, in May 1947, and was scrapped the following October.

== Honors and awards ==
- Asiatic-Pacific Campaign Medal with seven battle stars for World War II service
