= USS Gar =

Submarine of the United States

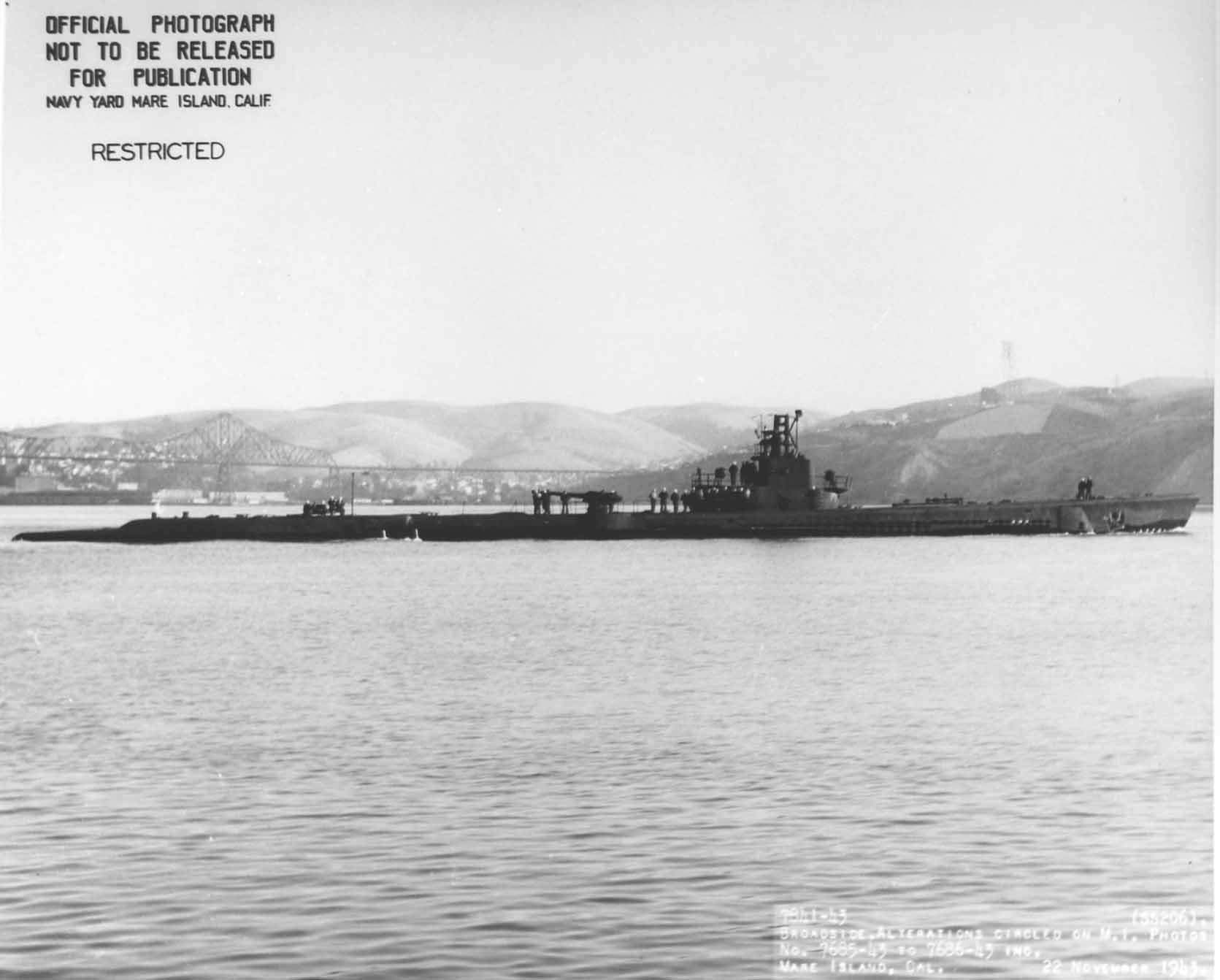
- USS Gar (SS-206) off Mare Island, California, on 22 November 1943

History

United States
- Builder: Electric Boat Company, Groton, Connecticut
- Laid down: 27 December 1939
- Launched: 27 November 1940
- Commissioned: 14 April 1941
- Decommissioned: 11 December 1945
- Stricken: 1 August 1959
- Fate: Sold for scrap, 11 December 1959

General characteristics
- Class & type: Tambor-class diesel-electric submarine
- Displacement: 1,475 long tons (1,499 t) standard, surfaced; 2,370 long tons (2,410 t) submerged
- Length: 307 ft 2 in (93.62 m)
- Beam: 27 ft 3 in (8.31 m)
- Draft: 14 ft 7 1/2 in (4.458 m)
- Propulsion: 4 × General Motors Model 16-248 V16 Diesel engines driving electric generators; 2 × 126-cell Sargo batteries; 4 × high-speed General Electric electric motors with reduction gears; two propellers; 5,400 shp (4.0 MW) surfaced; 2,740 shp (2.0 MW) submerged
- Speed: 20.4 knots (38 km/h) surfaced; 8.75 knots (16 km/h) submerged
- Range: 11,000 nautical miles (20,000 km) at 10 knots (19 km/h)
- Endurance: 48 hours at 2 knots (3.7 km/h) submerged
- Test depth: 250 ft (76 m)
- Complement: 6 officers, 54 enlisted
- Armament: 10 × 21-inch (533 mm) torpedo tubes; 6 forward, 4 aft; 24 torpedoes; 1 × 3-inch (76 mm) / 50 caliber deck gun; Bofors 40 mm and Oerlikon 20 mm cannon

USS Gar (SS-206) was the first of the Gar subclass of the Tambor-class submarines to be commissioned for the United States Navy just prior to the country's 7 December 1941 entry into World War II. These submarines were a slightly improved version of preceding submarines of the Tambor class. While Gar survived the war, all of her sister ships — USS Grampus (SS-207), USS Grayback (SS-208), USS Grayling (SS-209), USS Grenadier (SS-210), and USS Gudgeon (SS-211) — were lost. She is the only ship of the United States Navy to be named for the gar, a fish of the family Lepisosteidae.

== Construction and commissioning ==
Gar′s keel was laid down by the Electric Boat Company in Groton, Connecticut. She was launched on 7 November 1940, sponsored by Mrs. Leila P. Pettengill, wife of Rear Admiral George T. Pettengill, and commissioned at New London, Connecticut, on 14 April 1941.

== Depth charge tests and other operations, April 1941–January 1942 ==
Gar conducted shakedown training along the New England seaboard from Portsmouth, New Hampshire, and New London, Connecticut.

During 1941, Gar, along with the submarines USS Tambor (SS-198) and USS Trout (SS-202), was used as a target in the study of the effectiveness of depth charges. She submerged to periscope depth and was subjected to explosions of 300 pounds (136 kg) of TNT set at various distances from her. The data these tests generated influenced the design of shock proofing in later submarines.

Gar departed New London on 24 November and transited the Panama Canal on 3 December 1941 en route to San Diego, California, where she arrived on 10 December 1941, three days after the Japanese attack on Pearl Harbor that brought the United States into World War II. She prepared for combat in the Mare Island Naval Shipyard at Mare Island, California, then departed San Francisco, California, on 15 January 1942, bound for Pearl Harbor, Hawaii.

== First war patrol ==
Gar's maiden patrol, from 2 February to 28 March 1942, was conducted around Nagoya and the Kii Channel entrance to the Inland Sea of Japan. She torpedoed and sank the Japanese 1,520-gross register ton cargo ship Chichibu Maru on 13 March 1942.

== Second, third, and fourth war patrols ==
During her second war patrol, from 19 April to 8 June, she fired on a freighter off Kwajalein atoll, which her commanding officer believed was hit, but the ship did not sink. West of Truk Lagoon, she fired on a supposed Q-ship, which was not one in fact. Gar terminated her patrol at Fremantle, Australia. No sinkings were confirmed by JANAC postwar.

Her third war patrol, from 3 July to 21 August, took her to the South China Sea and the Gulf of Siam, where her only contact was a hospital ship. Her fourth war patrol, from 17 September to 7 November, took her to the northernmost waters in the Gulf of Siam, where on 19 October she laid 32 mines in the entrances to Bangkok. This was one of the strategic plants covering important Japanese shipping lanes previously patrolled by American submarines. Both patrols produced few contacts, thanks to timid patrolling, and no sinkings. Gar's executive officer and third officer both requested transfers on her return, while her commanding officer received a "blistering" endorsement from his squadron commander and was relieved.

== Fifth, sixth, and seventh war patrols ==
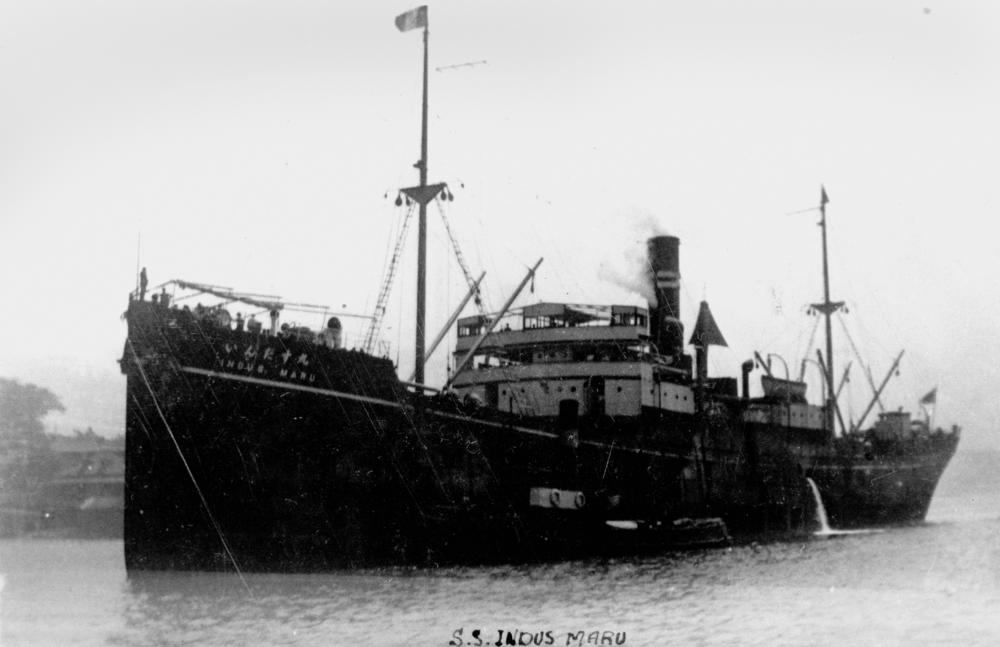
Gar sank Indus Maru on 15 May 1943.

Gar's fifth, sixth and seventh war patrols were conducted largely in approaches to Manila, Philippine Islands, via Borneo. During her fifth, from 28 November to 19 January 1943, she drove freighter Heinan Maru onto the beach with six torpedo hits and scored hits on a seaplane tender. (Gar was credited with one ship of 600 tons by JANAC postwar.) Her sixth, from 9 February to 2 April, brought numerous contacts with targets which could not be closed to firing range because of vigilant enemy aircraft and antisubmarine patrol ships. During her seventh war patrol, from 23 April to 27 May 1943 off Manila, she sank five small craft with gunfire; torpedoed and sank the 703-ton Japanese freighter/converted gunboat Aso Maru south of the Negros Islands on 9 May, then six days later attacked a convoy west of Mindoro, sinking the 3197-ton passenger-cargo ship Meikai Maru and the 4361-ton Indus Maru.

Captain Philip D. Quirk served on numerous ships and submarines in World War II, and was also the commanding officer on USS Fort Mandan (LSD-21) following the outbreak of the Korean War. Quirk was awarded six Bronze Star Medals. As commanding officer of USS Gridley (DD-380), his first award was for assisting in the rescue of RM1/c George R. Tweed from the Japanese-held island of Guam. Tweed had been marooned there since the Japanese invasion, and later wrote a book about his adventures titled Robinson Crusoe, USN. Quirk then commanded USS Walker (DD-517), before transferring to the Submarine Service and assuming command of USS Gar. He was awarded his fifth Bronze Star Medal in 1946 for Gar's fifth patrol. Quirk was awarded the Silver Star for the seventh patrol, which sank three Japanese ships totaling 8000 tons.

Quirk complained loudly about the Navy's faulty torpedoes, and was assigned to shore duty in July 1943. This scandal was soon proven all too true and corrected. Quirk was restored to grace, but transferred back to destroyer commands.

== Eighth and ninth war patrols ==
Her eighth war patrol, from 18 June to 23 July, was spent patrolling the Flores Sea, where she torpedoed a 500-ton motorship which ran itself aground, the crew escaping into the jungle. (Gar was not given credit for it by JANAC.) En route from Fremantle to Pearl Harbor on her ninth war patrol, from 8 August to 13 September, Gar scouted off Timor and scored hits on a freighter in Makassar Strait. She then went in for overhaul and modernization in the Mare Island Navy Yard.

Gar returned to Pearl Harbor 30 November 1943, now in the hands of George W. Lautrup, Jr. (class of 1934), to resume combat duty in the Pacific, based out of Fremantle. Her ninth patrol saw her credited with one ship of 4,000 tons (reduced to 1,000 tons in the postwar accounting).

== Tenth through thirteenth war patrols ==
Her tenth war patrol, out of Fremantle from 16 December 1943 to 9 February 1944, was conducted off Palau, where on 20 January she sank the 5325-ton cargo ship Koyu Maru; damaged two ships of another convoy on 22 January; then attacked a third convoy the following day and sank the 3670-ton Taian Maru. She then returned to Pearl Harbor.

Her 11th war patrol, from 3 March to 21 April, found her performing lifeguard duty for aviators making the first carrier-based air strikes on Palau. She saved eight aviators, one less than two miles (3 km) off the beach and within range of enemy gun emplacements.

Her 12th patrol, from 20 May to 5 July, was spent in the Bonin Islands area, where she made gunfire attacks on a convoy of Japanese sea trucks, leaving a small freighter raging in flames and dead in the water.

Her 13th patrol (now commanded by Maurice Ferrara, the first officer of the United States Naval Academy Class of 1937 to be given a submarine command), lasted from 14 August to 9 October and was largely taken up with lifeguard duty off Yap, supporting the combined fleet-shore operations that captured the Palau Islands. She also performed reconnaissance duty off Surigao Strait. She bombarded installations on Yap from 6 to 8 September and ended her patrol at Brisbane, Australia.

== Fourteenth and fifteenth war patrols ==
On her 14th war patrol, from 3 to 30 November, Gar landed 16 men and 25 tons of supplies at San Esteban, Ilocos Sur, Luzon, Philippine Islands, on 23 November and picked up intelligence documents. On 27 November 1944, an Allied PBY Catalina mistook her for a Japanese submarine and attacked her in the Celebes Sea 20 nautical miles (37 km; 23 mi) southeast of the Sibutu Passage at 04°33′N 119°50′E. Gar crash-dived to a depth of 150 feet (46 m) and heard three bombs explode, none of them close. She terminated her patrol in the lagoon at Mios Woendi in the Schouten Islands.

On her 15th and final war patrol, from 4 to 27 December, she landed 35 tons of supplies on the west coast of Luzon, near Darigayos Inlet on 11 December, returning to Pearl Harbor with urgent intelligence documents including maps locating enemy gun emplacements, beach defenses, troop concentrations, and fuel and ammunition dumps on Luzon. Some of those supplies and personnel made their way to Donald Blackburn's guerrilla force.

== End of World War II and fate ==
After overhaul in the Pearl Harbor Naval Shipyard, Gar put to sea 2 April 1945 to serve the remainder of the war as a target trainer for antisubmarine ships at Saipan and Guam, Marianas Islands. She departed Apra Harbor, Guam, on 7 August 1945, proceeding via Hawaii, San Francisco, California, and the Panama Canal to the Portsmouth Naval Shipyard in Kittery, Maine, where she arrived 20 October.

She decommissioned there 11 December 1945 and remained in reserve until September 1948, when she began an overhaul in the Portsmouth Naval Shipyard which lasted until through October. She was then transferred as a United States Naval Reserve training submarine for the 4th Naval District at Cleveland, Ohio, arriving there via the Mississippi River and the Chicago Canal on 28 November 1948. She continued her reserve training until her name was stricken from the Naval Vessel Register on 29 May 1959. She was sold for scrapping 18 November 1959 to Acme Scrap Iron and Metal Company.

== Honors and awards ==
Gar received 11 battle stars for service in World War II.
