= HMS Tay (K232) =

River-class frigate of the Royal Navy

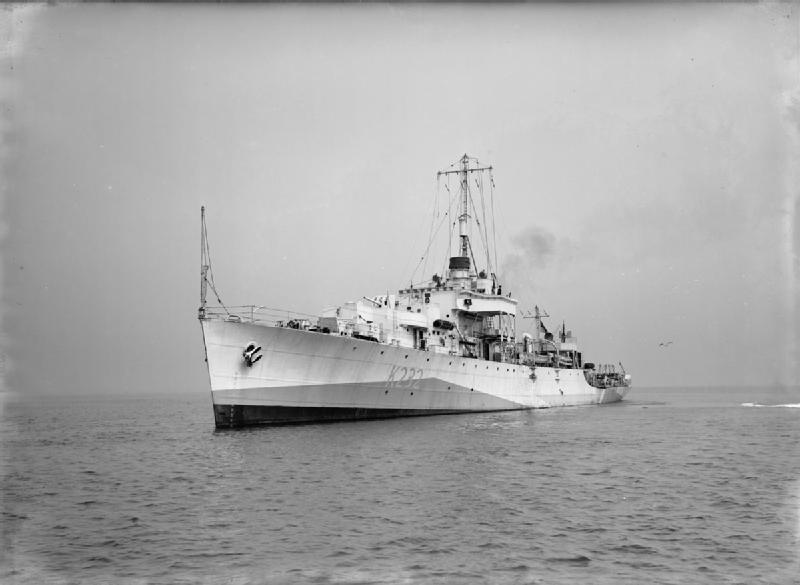
- HMS Tay in August 1942

History

United Kingdom
- Name: Tay
- Namesake: River Tay
- Ordered: 11 February 1941
- Builder: Smiths Dock Company, South Bank-on-Tees
- Laid down: 10 September 1941
- Launched: 18 March 1942
- Commissioned: 5 August 1942
- Fate: Scrapped on 28 September 1956

General characteristics
- Class & type: River-class frigate
- Displacement: 1,370 long tons (1,390 t); 1,830 long tons (1,860 t) (deep load)
- Length: 283 ft (86.26 m) p/p; 301.25 ft (91.82 m)o/a
- Beam: 36.5 ft (11.13 m)
- Draught: 9 ft (2.74 m); 13 ft (3.96 m) (deep load)
- Propulsion: 2 x Admiralty 3-drum boilers, 2 shafts, reciprocating vertical triple expansion, 5,500 ihp (4,100 kW)
- Speed: 20 knots (37.0 km/h)
- Range: 440 long tons (450 t; 490 short tons) oil fuel; 7,200 nautical miles (13,334 km) at 12 knots (22.2 km/h)
- Complement: 107
- Armament: 2 × QF 4-inch (102 mm) Mk.XIX guns, single mounts CP Mk.XXIII; up to 10 x QF 20 mm Oerlikon AA guns on twin mounts Mk.V and single mounts Mk.III; 1 × Hedgehog 24 spigot A/S projector; up to 150 depth charges

HMS Tay (K232) was a River-class frigate of the Royal Navy. Tay was built to the RN's specifications as a Group I River-class frigate. She was adopted by the civil community of Bridge of Allan in Stirlingshire, as part of the Warship Week war savings campaign in 1942.

== Royal Navy service ==
On commissioning Tay was allocated for service as a convoy escort in the Western Approaches and the Atlantic.

In June 1943 she was allocated for service in the Eastern Fleet, operating in the Indian Ocean. At the end of the war she remained based at Singapore, until returning to the UK in 1947 where she was paid off and reduced to reserve. She was placed on the disposal list in 1956 and was towed to the breakers yard at Rosyth on 26 September 1956.

== Publications ==
- Colledge, J. J.; Warlow, Ben (2006) [1969]. Ships of the Royal Navy: The Complete Record of All Fighting Ships of the Royal Navy from the 15th Century to the Present (3rd Rev ed.). London: Chatham Publishing. ISBN 978-1-86176-281-8. OCLC 67375475.
- Gretton, Vice-Admiral Sir Peter (1974). Crisis Convoy: The Story of HX231, A Turning Point in the Battle of the Atlantic. Leeds, UK: Sapere Books. ISBN 978-1-80055-276-0.
