= Clive Gwinner =

Royal Navy officer

- Born: 15 October 1908
- Died: 1998 (aged 89–90); Vancouver, Canada
- Military career
- Allegiance: United Kingdom
- Branch: Royal Navy
- Service years: 1922– (resigned post-World War II)
- Rank: Commander
- Units: HMS Frobisher; HMS Duncan; HMS Clare; HMS Lulworth; HMS Woodcock; HMS Affleck
- Conflicts: Battle of the Atlantic; Operation Neptune (D-Day naval component)
- Awards: Distinguished Service Order & Bar; Distinguished Service Cross
- Other work: Director of an American container company; retired 1971; remarried 1971

Clive Gwinner (1908–1998) was a Royal Navy officer who served during the Second World War. He was a successful Anti-Submarine Warfare commander, being credited with the destruction of seven U-boats during the Battle of the Atlantic.

== Early life ==
Clive Gwinner was born 15 October 1908. In 1922, aged 14, he joined the Royal Navy as an officer cadet, and in 1926 was appointed to the cruiser HMS Frobisher, with the rank of midshipman.

In 1930 he was made Sub-Lieutenant, and 1931 Lieutenant. In the period before the Second World War Gwinner served in several postings including 2 years aboard the submarine L53.

== War-time service ==
At the outbreak of World War II in September 1939 Gwinner was commander of the minesweeper Alresford with rank of lieutenant commander: In February 1940 he was appointed commanding officer of the destroyer Duncan, followed in July with a shore posting in Canada.

In September 1940, Gwinner commissioned HMS Clare (a Town class destroyer) and was employed for the next nine months as a convoy escort. In this role Gwinner was engaged in all the duties performed by escort ships; protecting convoys, searching for and attacking U-boats assaulting ships in convoy, and rescuing survivors.

In June 1941, he took over as the first CO of the sloop Lulworth (ex USCG) commanding her for next two years. During this time Gwinner and Lulworth were assigned to the West Africa convoy route, escorting ships to and from Freetown, Sierra Leone. In this role Gwinner escorted 12 long distance convoys, ensuring the safe and timely arrival of more than 300 ships. Several of these convoys were attacked, involving Gwinner in convoy battles for OS 4 (five ships sunk), OS 10 (one ship), SL 98 (1 escort sunk), SL 109 (attacking U-boats all beaten off, though one ship sunk) and SL 115 (where Gwinner and Lulworth destroyed the Italian submarine Pietro Calvi, for which he was awarded the DSO).

In April 1943, after a short spell back with Duncan Gwinner was given command of the sloop Woodcock, and assigned to FJ Walker's 2nd Support Group. In July 1943 during operations in Bay of Biscay 2SG engaged 3 U-boats on the surface; Woodcock shared in the destruction of U-462. In November Gwinner took part in the destruction of U-226.

In February 1944, Gwinner took command of the frigate HMS Affleck as senior officer of 1st Escort Group, though operating mainly in a support group role. That month they destroyed U-91, and in March 1944 destroyed U-358 after a 39-hour hunt, one of the longest U-boat hunts of the war. Two weeks later Gwinner and 1EG destroyed U-392.

In June 1944, 1EG was assigned to protect invasion forces during Operation Neptune, the naval component of the D-day landings. During an action in the Channel, Gwinner was credited with a probable success, later confirmed and identified as U-1191. In December Affleck was torpedoed and declared a constructive total loss; Gwinner transferred his pennant to Balfour, and continued operations, but had no more successes.

In May 1945, Germany surrendered and hostilities in Europe ended.

== Later life ==
At the end of the war Gwinner left the Royal Navy and moved to the US where he became director to an American container company, retiring in 1971. In 1969, his marriage ended; he married again two years later and moved to Vancouver. He died there in 1998, aged 89.

== Successes ==
Gwinner was credited with the destruction of seven enemy submarines in his war-time service.

Date	U-boat	Type	Location	Notes
16 July 1942	Pietro Calvi	Calvi class submarine	Central Atlantic, W of Canary Islands	Lulworth (Gwinner)
30 July 1943	U-462	XIV	Bay of Biscay	Hal S/502 Sqdn (v Rossum), Kite (Segrave), Woodcock (Gwinner), Woodpecker (Hugonin), Wren (Aubrey), Wild Goose (Walker)
6 Nov 1943	U-226	VIIC	North Atlantic. E of Cape Race	Starling (Walker), Woodcock (Gwinner), Kite (Segrave)
26 Feb 1944	U-91	VIIC	N Atlantic, W of Cape Clear	Affleck (Gwinner), Gould (Ungoed), Gore (Reeve-Brown)
1 March 1944	U-358	VIIC	Atlantic, NE of Azores	Gould (Ungoed), Affleck (Gwinner), Gore (Reeve-Brown), Garlies (Caple)
16 March 1944	U-392	VIIC	Straits of Gibraltar	Catalina's P1 (Lingle), P7 (Vopatek), P8 (Spears), Vanoc (Ward), Affleck (Gwinner) (G)
25 June 1944	U-1191	VIIC	English Channel, SE of Torquay	Affleck (Gwinner), Balfour (Coventry)
