= Herbert Arthur Stonehouse =

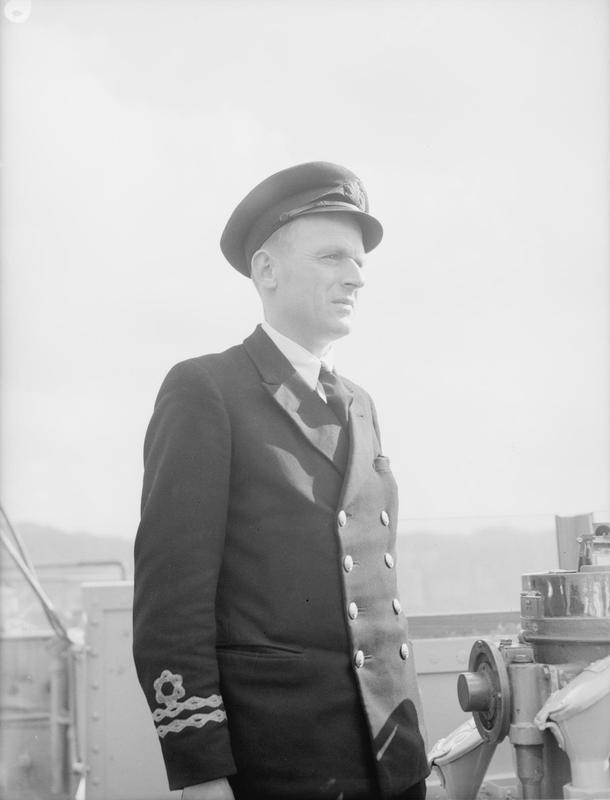
Lt. H.A. Stonehouse RNR.

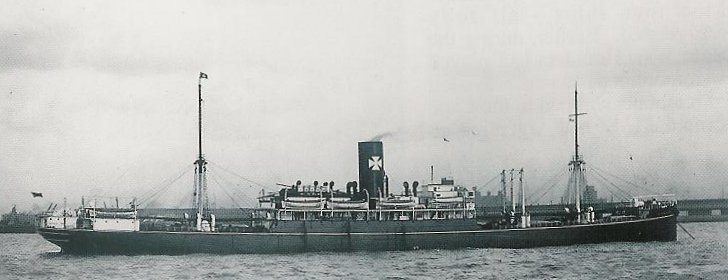
El Paraguayo

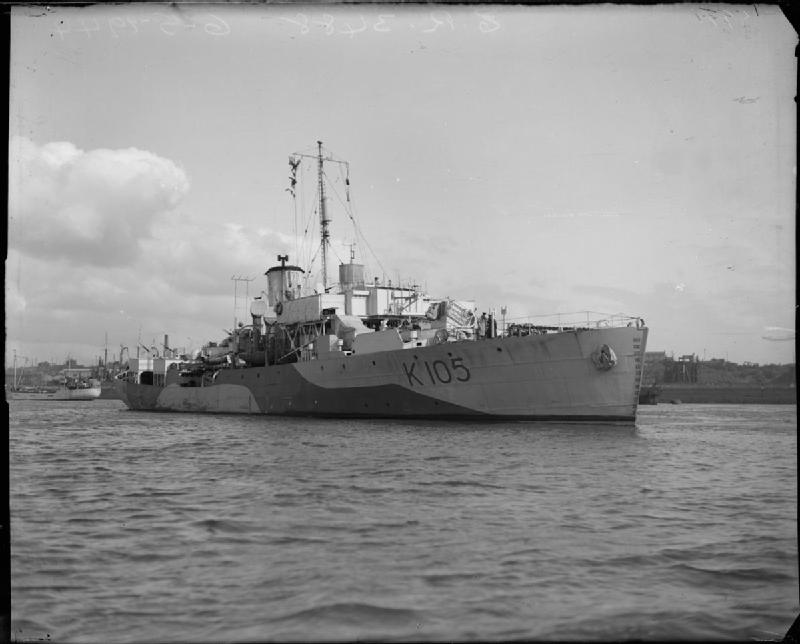
HMS Loosestrife

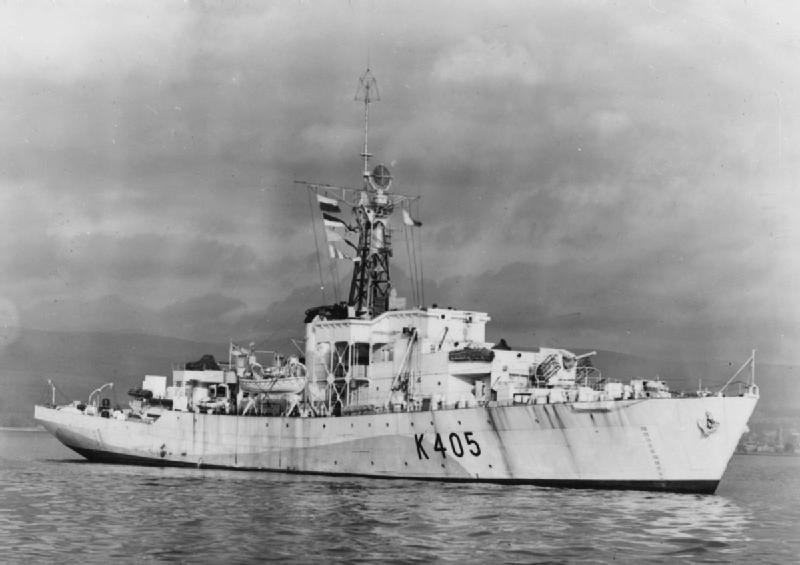
HMS Alnwick Castle in 1944.

Herbert Arthur Stonehouse (1909-1984) was a British Royal Navy Reserve officer who was awarded the Distinguished Service Cross and bar for his service escorting convoys during the Second World War and who in 1943 sank the German submarine U-192.

== Early life ==
Herbert Stonehouse was born in West Derby, Lancashire, in 1909, to Adeline Ann and Reginald Stonehouse, a shipping clerk from Horsforth in Yorkshire.

== Career ==
Stonehouse was registered as a merchant seaman in Liverpool in 1930 and shown with a rating of QM (Quarter Master). His card shows the name El Paraguayo, a meat carrier believed at the time of her launch in 1911 to be the largest refrigerated vessel constructed with a capacity of over 405,000 cubic feet. The ship plied the route between Liverpool and the River Plate in South America.

Stonehouse became an Acting Lieutenant in the Royal Naval Reserve on 3 February 1939 and attained the rank of Lieutenant on 11 January 1940.

In 1943–44, he was the commander of the corvette HMS Loosestrife which on 5 May 1943 attempted unsuccessfully to scuttle the merchantman SS Wentworth after the ship was seriously damaged by German submarine U-358, under the command of Rolf Manke.

On 6 May 1943, Loosestrife sank the German submarine U-192 in the North Atlantic south-east of Cape Farewell using depth charges.

From 20 July 1944 to mid 1945, Stonehouse commanded the corvette HMS Alnwick Castle as an Acting Lieutenant Commander.

From 9 July 1945 to 30 December 1945 he commanded the corvette HMS Oakham Castle. Stonehouse became a Lieutenant Commander 11 Jan 1948 and a Commander on 30 June 1954. He retired from the navy in 1959.

== Honours ==
Stonehouse was awarded the Distinguished Service Cross on 19 October 1943 and bar on 19 June 1945.

== Death ==
Stonehouse died in North Walsham, Norfolk, in 1984.
