= List of ships built at the Boston Navy Yard =

The following is a partial list of ships built at the Boston Navy Yard, also called the Charlestown Navy Yard and Boston Naval Shipyard. The year shown is the launch year.

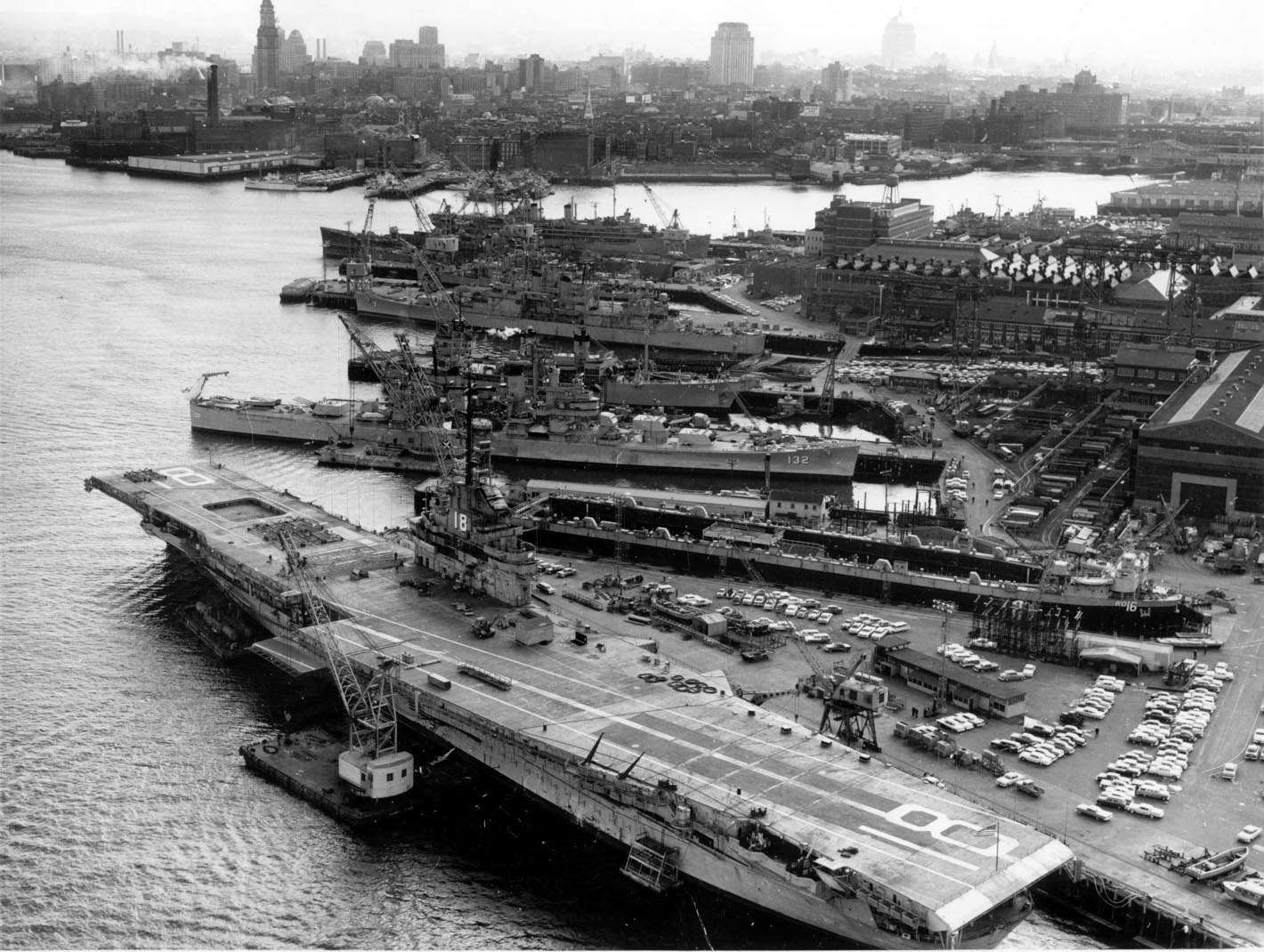
Aerial view of the Boston Navy Yard in April 1960.

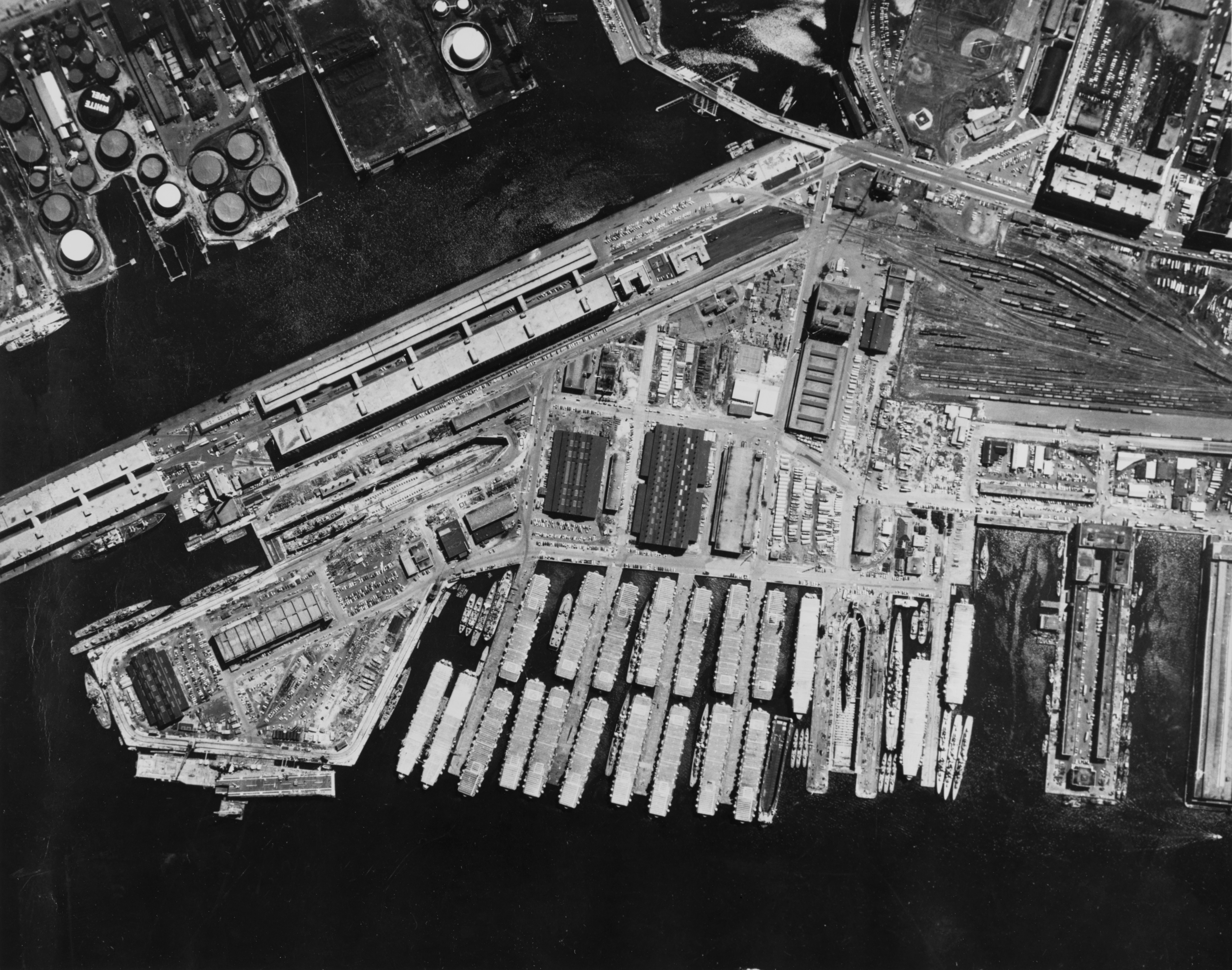
The South Boston Naval Annex, circa 1958

- 1814: USS Independence (90-gun ship of the line) War of 1812; Mexican–American War
- 1825: USS Boston (18-gun sloop of war) Mexican–American War
- 1827: USS Warren (20-gun sloop of war) Mexican–American War
- 1827: USS Falmouth (24-gun sloop of war) Mexican–American War
- 1837: USS Cyane (22-gun sloop of war) Mexican–American War; American Civil War
- 1839: USS Marion (16-gun sloop of war) American Civil War
- 1842: USS Cumberland (50-gun frigate) Mexican–American War; Battle of Hampton Roads
- 1844: USS Plymouth (22-gun sloop of war) Perry Expedition
- 1848: USS Vermont (74-gun ship of the line) American Civil War
- 1858: USS Hartford (22-gun sloop of war) Battle of Forts Jackson and St. Philip; Battle of Mobile Bay
- 1859: USS Narragansett (5-gun sloop of war) American Civil War
- 1861: USS Wachusett (10-gun sloop of war) Peninsula Campaign; Bahia incident
- 1861: USS Housatonic (11-gun sloop of war) Sinking of USS Housatonic
- 1861: USS Maratanza (side-wheel steam gunboat) Peninsula Campaign; First Battle of Fort Fisher; Second Battle of Fort Fisher
- 1862: USS Canandaigua (6-gun sloop of war) American Civil War
- 1862: USS Tioga (side-wheel steam gunboat) American Civil War
- 1862: USS Genesee (side-wheel steam gunboat) American Civil War
- 1863: USS Monadnock (monitor) First Battle of Fort Fisher; Second Battle of Fort Fisher
- 1863: USS Pequot (gunboat) First Battle of Fort Fisher; Second Battle of Fort Fisher
- 1863: USS Saco (gunboat) American Civil War
- 1863: USS Winooski (side-wheel steam gunboat)
- 1864: USS Ammonoosuc (frigate)
- 1865: USS Guerriere (sloop of war)
- 1866: USS Worcester (sloop of war)
- 1867: USS Nantasket (sloop of war)
- 1868: USS Alaska (sloop of war) Battle of Ganghwa
- 1876: USS Vandalia (sloop of war) 1889 Apia cyclone
- 1916: USS Bridge (Combat stores ship) World War I; World War II
- 1919: USS Brazos (Fleet oiler) World War II
- 1920: USS Neches (Fleet oiler) World War II
- 1921: USS Pecos (Fleet oiler) World War II
- 2 of 8 Farragut-class destroyers
  - 1934: USS MacDonough (DD-351) Attack on Pearl Harbor; Battle of Savo Island; Battle of the Philippine Sea; Battle of Leyte Gulf
  - 1935: USS Monaghan (DD-354) Attack on Pearl Harbor; Battle of the Coral Sea; Battle of Midway; Battle of the Komandorski Islands; Battle of the Philippine Sea
- 2 of 18 Mahan-class destroyers
  - 1935: USS Case (DD-370) Attack on Pearl Harbor; Battle of the Philippine Sea
  - 1935: USS Conyngham (DD-371) Attack on Pearl Harbor; Battle of Midway; Battle of the Santa Cruz Islands; Operation Crossroads
- 2 of 8 Bagley-class destroyers
  - 1936: USS Mugford (DD-389) Attack on Pearl Harbor
  - 1936: USS Ralph Talbot (DD-390) Attack on Pearl Harbor; Battle of Savo Island; Battle of Kolombangara; Battle off Cape Engaño; Operation Crossroads
- 2 of 10 Benham-class destroyers
  - 1938: USS Mayrant (DD-402) Naval Battle of Casablanca; Operation Crossroads
  - 1938: USS Trippe (DD-403) Allied invasion of Sicily; Invasion of Salerno; Operation Crossroads
- 2 of 12 Sims-class destroyers
  - 1939: USS O'Brien (DD-415) Guadalcanal Campaign
  - 1939: USS Walke (DD-416) Naval Battle of Guadalcanal
- 2 of 30 Benson-class destroyers
  - 1939: USS Madison (DD-425) Battle of the Atlantic; Operation Dragoon
  - 1939: USS Lansdale (DD-426) Battle of the Atlantic
- 10 of 66 Gleaves-class destroyers
  - 1940: USS Gwin (DD-433) Doolittle Raid; Battle of Midway; Naval Battle of Guadalcanal; Battle of Kolombangara
  - 1940: USS Meredith (DD-434) Doolittle Raid
  - 1940: USS Wilkes (DD-441) Naval Battle of Casablanca
  - 1940: USS Nicholson (DD-442) invasion of Salerno; Battle for Leyte Gulf
  - 1941: USS Forrest (DD-461) Operation Torch; Normandy invasion; Operation Dragoon; Battle of Okinawa
  - 1941: USS Fitch (DD-462) Operation Torch; Normandy invasion; Operation Dragoon
  - 1941: USS Cowie (DD-632) Operation Torch; Allied invasion of Sicily
  - 1941: USS Knight (DD-633) Operation Torch; Allied invasion of Sicily; Allied invasion of Italy
  - 1941: USS Doran (DD-634) Operation Torch; Allied invasion of Sicily
  - 1941: USS Earle (DD-635) Allied invasion of Sicily
- 14 of 175 Fletcher-class destroyers
  - 1942: USS Guest (DD-472) Battle of the Philippine Sea; Battle of Iwo Jima; Battle of Okinawa
  - 1942: USS Bennett (DD-473) Battle of Iwo Jima; Battle of Okinawa
  - 1942: USS Fullam (DD-474) Battle of the Philippine Sea; Battle of Iwo Jima; Battle of Okinawa
  - 1942: USS Hudson (DD-475) Battle of the Philippine Sea; Battle of Iwo Jima; Battle of Okinawa
  - 1942: USS Hutchins (DD-476) Battle of Surigao Strait; Battle of Iwo Jima; Battle of Okinawa
  - 1942: USS Charrette (DD-581) Battle of the Philippine Sea; Battle for Leyte Gulf
  - 1942: USS Conner (DD-582) Battle of the Philippine Sea; Battle for Leyte Gulf
  - 1942: USS Hall (DD-583) Philippines campaign; Battle of Iwo Jima; Battle of Okinawa
  - 1943: USS Halligan (DD-584) Philippines campaign; Battle of Iwo Jima; Battle of Okinawa
  - 1943: USS Haraden (DD-585) Philippines campaign
  - 1943: USS Newcomb (DD-586) Battle of Surigao Strait; Battle of Iwo Jima; Battle of Okinawa
  - 1943: USS Bennion (DD-662) Battle of Leyte; Battle of Iwo Jima; Battle of Okinawa
  - 1943: USS Heywood L. Edwards (DD-663) Battle of Surigao Strait; Battle of Iwo Jima; Battle of Okinawa
  - 1943: USS Richard P. Leary (DD-664) Battle of Surigao Strait; Battle of Iwo Jima; Battle of Okinawa
- 21 of 65 Evarts-class destroyer escorts
  - 1942: USS Evarts (DE-5) Battle of the Atlantic
  - 1942: USS Wyffels (DE-6) Battle of the Atlantic
  - 1943: USS Griswold (DE-7) shared credit for sinking I-39; Battle of Okinawa
  - 1943: USS Steele (DE-8) Pacific Theater of Operations
  - 1943: USS Carlson (DE-9) Battle of Okinawa
  - 1943: USS Bebas (DE-10) Battle of Okinawa
  - 1943: USS Crouter (DE-11) Battle of Okinawa
  - 1943: USS Seid (DE-256) Battle of Okinawa
  - 1943: USS Smartt (DE-257) Battle of the Atlantic
  - 1943: USS Walter S. Brown (DE-258) Battle of the Atlantic
  - 1943: USS William C. Miller (DE-259) shared credit for sinking Japanese submarine I-55 (1944)
  - 1943: USS Cabana (DE-260) Pacific Theater of Operations
  - 1943: USS Dionne (DE-261) Pacific Theater of Operations
  - 1943: USS Canfield (DE-262) Pacific Theater of Operations
  - 1943: USS Deede (DE-263) Pacific Theater of Operations
  - 1943: USS Elden (DE-264) Pacific Theater of Operations
  - 1943: USS Cloues (DE-265) Battle of Okinawa
  - 1943: USS O'Toole (DE-527) Battle of the Atlantic
  - 1943: USS John J. Powers (DE-528) Battle of the Atlantic
  - 1943: USS Mason (DE-529) Battle of the Atlantic
  - 1943: USS John M. Bermingham (DE-530) Battle of the Atlantic
- 31 of 32 Evarts-class destroyer escorts converted to Captain-class frigates
  - 1942: HMS Bayntun shared credit for sinking U-757, U-1279, U-989 & U-1278
  - 1942: HMS Bazely shared credit for sinking U-648, U-600 & U-636
  - 1942: HMS Berry Battle of the Atlantic
  - 1942: HMS Blackwood shared credit for sinking U-648 & U-600
  - 1943: HMS Burges shared credit for sinking U-1063
  - 1943: HMS Capel Battle of the Atlantic
  - 1943: HMS Cooke shared credit for sinking U-988 & U-214
  - 1943: HMS Dacres Normandy Invasion
  - 1943: HMS Domett shared credit for sinking U-988
  - 1943: HMS Foley shared credit for sinking U-538
  - 1943: HMS Garlies shared credit for sinking U-358
  - 1943: HMS Gould shared credit for sinking U-91 & U-358
  - 1943: HMS Grindall Battle of the Atlantic
  - 1943: HMS Gardiner Battle of the Atlantic
  - 1943: HMS Goodall Battle of the Atlantic
  - 1943: HMS Goodson Battle of the Atlantic
  - 1943: HMS Gore shared credit for sinking U-91 & U-358
  - 1943: HMS Keats shared credit for sinking U-1172 & U-285
  - 1943: HMS Kempthorne Battle of the Atlantic
  - 1943: HMS Kingsmill Normandy Invasion
  - 1943: HMS Lawford Normandy Invasion
  - 1943: HMS Louis shared credit for sinking U-445
  - 1943: HMS Lawson Battle of the Atlantic
  - 1943: HMS Pasley Battle of the Atlantic
  - 1943: HMS Loring Battle of the Atlantic
  - 1943: HMS Hoste Battle of the Atlantic
  - 1943: HMS Moorsom Battle of the Atlantic
  - 1943: HMS Manners shared credit for sinking U-1051
  - 1943: HMS Mounsey Battle of the Atlantic
  - 1943: HMS Inglis Battle of the Atlantic
  - 1943: HMS Inman Battle of the Atlantic
- 10 of 83 John C. Butler-class destroyer escorts
  - 1943: USS Edward H. Allen (DE-531) rescued crew of the SS Andrea Doria
  - 1943: USS Tweedy (DE-532)
  - 1943: USS Howard F. Clark (DE-533) Battle for Leyte Gulf; Battle of Okinawa
  - 1943: USS Silverstein (DE-534) Pacific Theater of Operations; Korean War
  - 1943: USS Lewis (DE-535) Pacific Theater of Operations
  - 1943: USS Bivin (DE-536) Pacific Theater of Operations
  - 1943: USS Rizzi (DE-537)
  - 1943: USS Osberg (DE-538)
  - 1943: USS Wagner (DER-539)
  - 1943: USS Vandivier (DER-540)
- 4 of 29 Tench-class submarines
  - 1944: USS Amberjack (SS-522)
  - 1944: USS Grampus (SS-523)
  - 1944: USS Pickerel (SS-524)
  - 1944: USS Grenadier (SS-525)
- 4 of 17 Casa Grande-class dock landing ships
  - 1945: USS Donner (LSD-20) Mercury-Redstone 2 recovery
  - 1945: USS Fort Mandan (LSD-21)
  - 1945: USS Tortuga (LSD-26) Korean War; Vietnam War
  - 1945: USS Whetstone (LSD-27) Korean War; Vietnam War
- APD conversions
  - Sims (DE-154)

== See also ==
- List of United States Navy ships
