= HMS Loosestrife =

Flower-class corvette

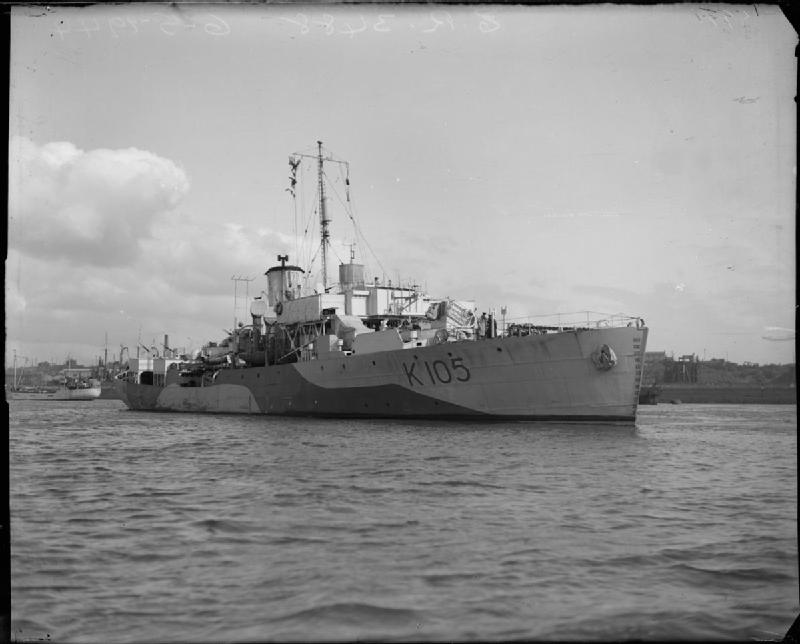
- HMS Loosestrife

History

United Kingdom
- Name: Loosestrife
- Ordered: 1939
- Builder: Hall, Russell & Company
- Laid down: December 1940
- Launched: 25 August 1941
- Commissioned: 25 November 1941
- Decommissioned: 1945
- Fate: Sold into civilian service, 7 October 1946, scrapped 1962

General characteristics
- Class & type: Flower-class corvette (original)
- Displacement: 925 long tons (940 t; 1,036 short tons)
- Length: 205 ft (62.48 m)o/a
- Beam: 33 ft (10.06 m)
- Draught: 11.5 ft (3.51 m)
- Propulsion: single shaft; 2 × fire tube Scotch boilers; 1 × 4-cycle triple-expansion reciprocating steam engine; 2,750 ihp (2,050 kW)
- Speed: 16 knots (29.6 km/h)
- Range: 3,500 nautical miles (6,482 km) at 12 knots (22.2 km/h)
- Complement: 85
- Sensors & processing systems: 1 × SW1C or 2C radar; 1 × Type 123A or Type 127DV sonar
- Armament: 1 × BL 4-inch (101.6 mm) Mk.IX single gun; 2 x double Lewis machine gun; 2 × twin Vickers machine gun; 2 × Mk.II depth charge throwers; 2 × Depth charge rails with 40 depth charges; initially with minesweeper equipment, later removed

HMS Loosestrife (K105) was a Flower-class corvette of the Royal Navy which sailed with the North Atlantic convoys of the Second World War.

== Construction ==
Loosestrife was ordered from Hall, Russell & Company in 1939. She was laid down in December 1940 and launched on 25 August 1941. She was commissioned on 25 November 1941.

== Career ==
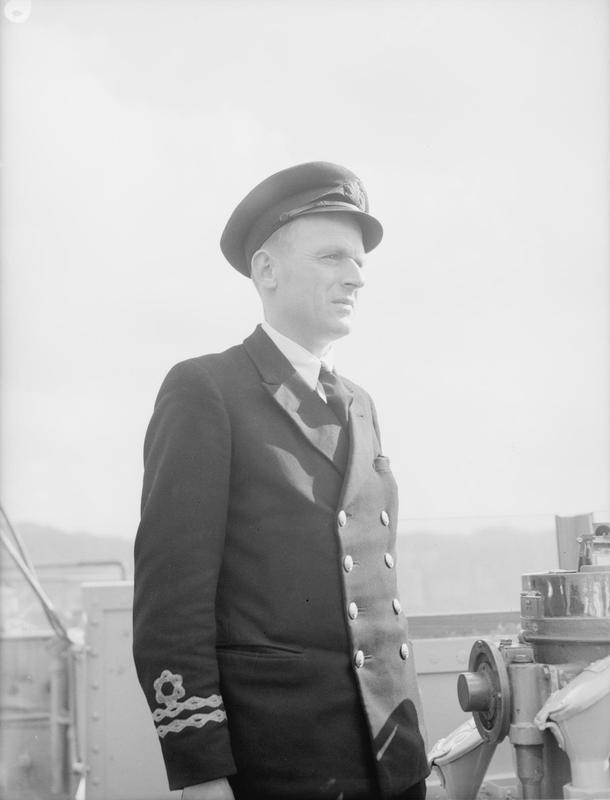
Lt. H.A. Stonehouse RNR, Commander of HMS Loosestrife.

Loosestrife sailed with Convoy ONS 5 (outward, northbound, slow) from Britain to North America in 1943. The convoy was made up of 42 ships, of which 12 or 13 were sunk after the convoy came under sustained attack from German submarines hunting in packs. On 5 May at 02:25, Bristol City was south of Greenland and east of Newfoundland when it was sunk by a torpedo fired by the German submarine U-358, under the command of Rolf Manke. Fifteen of the 44 people on board died. Manke attacked and damaged Wentworth not long after. Loosestrife rescued survivors from both sinkings and landed them at St. Johns in Newfoundland.

On 6 May 1943, Loosestrife sank German submarine U-192 in the North Atlantic south-east of Cape Farewell using depth charges (Lt. Herbert Arthur Stonehouse, RNR, commander). The entire crew of 55 died.

On 4 October 1946 Loosestrife was sold. In 1947 she was converted into the cargo ship Kallsevni.

== Publications ==
- Colledge, J. J.; Warlow, Ben (2006) [1969]. Ships of the Royal Navy: The Complete Record of All Fighting Ships of the Royal Navy from the 15th Century to the Present (3rd Rev ed.). London: Chatham Publishing. ISBN 978-1-86176-281-8. OCLC 67375475.
