= Garlies =

Garlies may refer to:

== People ==
- The Earl of Galloway, sometimes styled "Lord Garlies" or "Viscount Garlies," including:
  - Alan Stewart, 10th Earl of Galloway (1835-1901), styled Lord Garlies until 1873
  - Alexander Stewart, 1st Earl of Galloway (c. 1580-1649), created First Lord of Garlies in 1607
  - George Stewart, 8th Earl of Galloway (1768–1834), styled Lord Garlies 1773-1806
  - John Stewart, 7th Earl of Galloway (1736-1806), styled Viscount Garlies 1747-1773
  - Randolph Stewart, 12th Earl of Galloway (1892-1978), styled Viscount Garlies 1901-1920

== Ships ==
- HMS Garlies, a British frigate in commission in the Royal Navy from 1943 to 1945
- USS Garlies, a United States Navy destroyer escort in commission from August to October 1945
