= USS Suffolk County =

1956 De Soto County-class tank landing ship

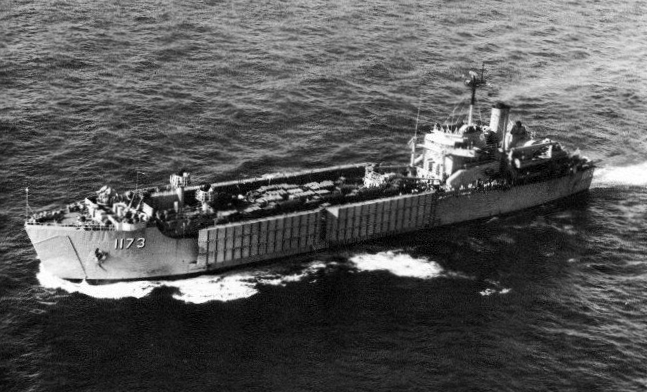
- USS Suffolk County (LST-1173) underway, circa 1965. Note the causeways attached to both the port and starboard sides.

History

United States
- Name: USS Suffolk County
- Namesake: Suffolk County in MA and NY
- Builder: Newport News Shipbuilding & Drydock Company, Newport News, Virginia
- Laid down: 17 July 1955
- Launched: 5 September 1956
- Commissioned: 15 August 1957
- Decommissioned: 25 August 1972
- Identification: IMO number: 8450354
- Fate: Sold for scrapping, 31 March 1999
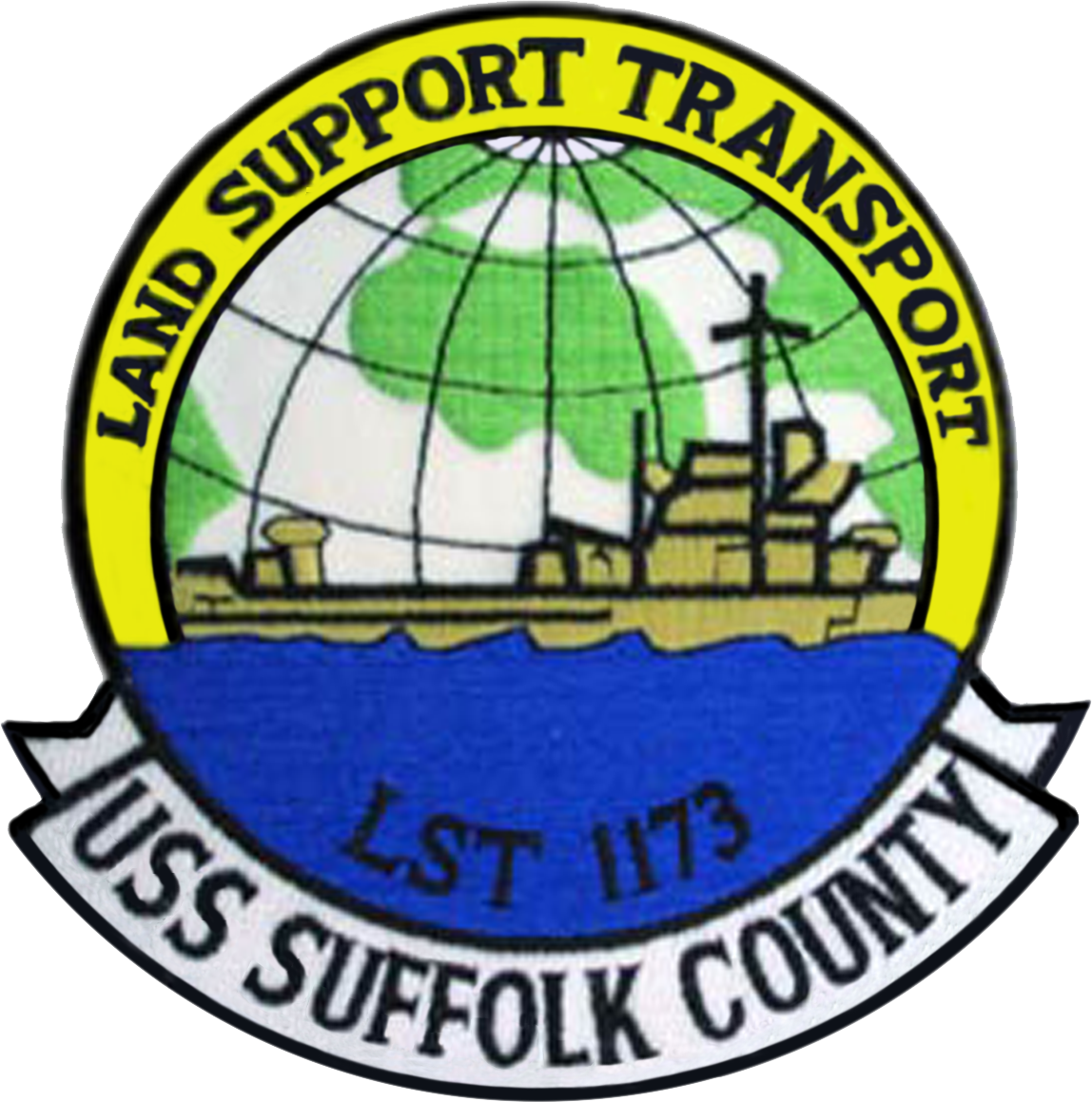
- Badge

General characteristics
- Class & type: De Soto County-class tank landing ship
- Displacement: 3,560 long tons (3,617 t) light; 7,823 long tons (7,949 t) full load
- Length: 446 ft (136 m)
- Beam: 62 ft (19 m)
- Draft: 17 ft (5.2 m)
- Propulsion: 6 × 2400 hp Fairbanks Morse opposed piston diesel engines, direct reversible
- Speed: 17 knots (31 km/h; 20 mph)
- Boats & landing craft carried: 4 LCVPs
- Capacity: 28 medium tanks or vehicles to 75 tons on 288 ft (88 m) tank deck; 100,000 gal (US) diesel or jet fuel, plus 7,000 gal fuel for embarked vehicles
- Troops: 410 officers and enlisted men
- Complement: 170 officers and enlisted men
- Armament: 3 × twin 3"/50 caliber gun mounts

USS Suffolk County (LST-1173) was a De Soto County-class tank landing ship built for the United States Navy during the late 1950s. Named after counties in Massachusetts and New York, she was the only U.S. Naval vessel to bear the name.

Suffolk County was designed under project SCB 119 and laid down on 17 July 1955 by the Boston Naval Shipyard, Boston, Massachusetts; launched on 5 September 1956; sponsored by Mrs. Thomas P. O'Neill Jr.; and commissioned on 15 August 1957.

== Service history ==
=== 1957–1959 ===
Suffolk County fitted out at Boston and sailed for Norfolk, Virginia on 1 October to hold shakedown training and exercises in beaching. She returned to Boston from 5 December 1957 to 3 February 1958 for post-shakedown availability. The ship was back at Norfolk three days later and began local training exercises. From 19 July to 7 August the LST participated in amphibious training exercises off Puerto Rico. Suffolk County departed Norfolk on 8 September and, after embarking marines at Morehead City, North Carolina sailed for the Mediterranean and her first tour with the 6th Fleet. She was part of the Armed Forces Expeditionary Group at Beirut, Lebanon from 29 September to 18 October 1958. Between fleet maneuvers that included amphibious assault landing exercises on Crete, Sardinia (twice), Libya and Almeria, Spain she called at ports in Gibraltar, Lebanon, Crete, Greece, Turkey, Italy, Spain and France. The ship stood out of Rota, Spain on 12 March 1959. After disembarking the marines at Morehead City on 24 March, she returned to Norfolk on the 26th. In June, she participated in "Operation Inland Seas" which was the formal opening of the St. Lawrence Seaway for ocean-going ships.

=== 1960–1961 ===
Suffolk County returned to Norfolk in August and was assigned to Amphibious Squadron (PhibRon) 8 which promptly deployed to the Mediterranean until 12 June 1960 when it returned to Norfolk. After a leave and upkeep period, she moved to Charleston, South Carolina for her first overhaul which lasted from mid-July to 15 September. As a unit of PhibRon 8, the ship participated in a landing demonstration off Onslow Beach, North Carolina from 29 October to 3 November. The following month found her in the Caribbean on a two-month deployment, ending at Norfolk on 17 January 1961. Suffolk County returned to the Caribbean in April on a normal deployment. However, she was called upon to operate off Guantánamo Bay from 25 April to 5 May and off the Dominican Republic from 1 to 13 June because of the international tension those two countries were creating. She returned to Norfolk and operated from there until 15 September when she sailed on "SoLant Amity III" deployment. After loading marines and equipment at North Carolina, she proceeded to Trinidad. Suffolk County was attached to Task Force (TF) 88 for the remainder of the cruise which included port calls at South Africa, French Equatorial Africa, Sierra Leone, Guinea, and Liberia. She returned to Little Creek, Virginia on 16 December 1961.

=== 1962–1972 ===
Suffolk County operated along the east coast, participating in various operations, deployments, and exercises which took her as far south as the Caribbean, Panama, and the Dominican Republic.From October to November 1962, she was part of the President Kennedy naval blockage of Cuba. Elements of the 2nd Marine Division, Camp Lejeune, North Carolina were deployed on this ship. From September to December 1964 she was involved in the cross Atlantic operation, "Operation Steel Pike", the largest amphibious operation since the World War II Normandy Landings. Elements of the 2nd Marine Division were landed at several locations along the Spanish coast. Suffolk County, in addition to her ship's company, carried several companies of Marines and she also served as the "home base" for the U.S. Naval Cargo Handling Battalion One (CHBONE). She was at Guantanamo on 26 September 1966 when Hurricane Inez struck the Caribbean and left a path of destruction in Hispaniola. Suffolk County aided the inhabitants of Cayes-Jacmel, Anse-à-Pitres, and Marigot, on the southern coast of Haiti, until 7 October. The LST then continued her routine operations until early 1968. On 16 April 1968 Suffolk County sailed for another deployment period with the 6th Fleet which lasted until 4 June. Normal peacetime, east coast operations were resumed until September 1970 when she steamed to the Mediterranean to partake in a two-month exercise with North Atlantic Treaty Organization (NATO) fleet units which ended on 18 November 1970. Her normal routine was next broken in September 1971 when she deployed to the 6th Fleet for her longest tour in years which lasted until mid-March 1972.

=== Decommissioning ===
When Suffolk County arrived at Norfolk, she was ordered to prepare for inactivation. A "stand-down" phase was begun on 24 May 1972 which lasted until 1 July when she was placed in commission, in reserve. On 25 August Suffolk County was placed out of commission, in reserve.

Disposed of by transfer to the Maritime Administration (MARAD) on 15 April 1992 for lay-up in the National Defense Reserve Fleet at James River, Fort Eustis, Virginia, the ship was sold for $500 to Transforma Marine of Brownsville, Texas for scrapping, 31 March 1999. Suffolk County was removed from the Reserve Fleet 23 November 1999 and scrapped.

== See also ==
- List of United States Navy LSTs
- List of ships built at the Boston Navy Yard
- Suffolk County, Massachusetts
- Suffolk County, New York
