= Manke =

Manke may refer to:

- John A. Manke (1931–2019), American test pilot and aerospace engineer
- Rolf Manke (1915–1944), commander of German submarine U-358.
- Manke Nelis (born 1919), Dutch singer in the levenslied genre.
- Mount Manke, a mountain in the Harold Byrd Mountains.
