= SS El Paraguayo =

British meat carrier ship

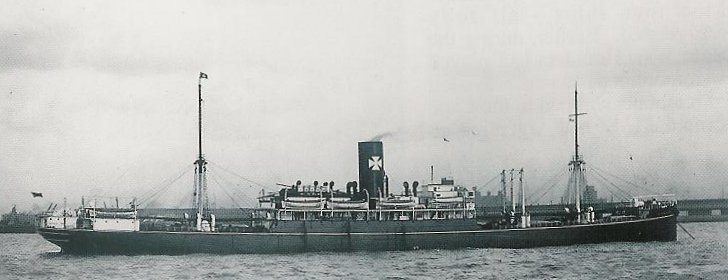
El Paraguayo

SS El Paraguayo was a British meat carrier ship believed at the time of her launch in 1911 to be the largest refrigerated vessel constructed with a capacity of over 405,000 cubic feet (11,468 cubic meters). The ship plied the route between Liverpool and the River Plate in South America.

El Paraguayo ran aground at Santos, São Paulo, Brazil, on 17 February 1930. She was refloated on 23 February 1930 and returned to service.

== See also ==
- Herbert Arthur Stonehouse
