= German submarine U-672 =

German World War II submarine

Coordinates: 50°3′N 2°30′W

History

Nazi Germany
- Name: U-672
- Ordered: 20 January 1941
- Builder: Howaldtswerke, Hamburg
- Yard number: 821
- Laid down: 24 December 1941
- Launched: 27 February 1943
- Commissioned: 6 April 1943
- Fate: Scuttled in the English Channel on 18 July 1944

General characteristics
- Class & type: Type VIIC submarine
- Displacement: 769 t (757 long tons) surfaced; 871 t (857 long tons) submerged
- Length: 67.10 m (220 ft 2 in) (o/a); 50.50 m (165 ft 8 in) (pressure hull)
- Beam: 6.20 m (20 ft 4 in) (o/a); 4.70 m (15 ft 5 in) (pressure hull)
- Height: 9.60 m (31 ft 6 in)
- Draught: 4.74 m (15 ft 7 in)
- Installed power: 2,800–3,200 PS (2,100–2,400 kW; 2,800–3,200 bhp) (diesels); 750 PS (550 kW; 740 shp) (electric)
- Propulsion: 2 shafts; 2 × diesel engines; 2 × electric motors
- Speed: 17.7 knots (32.8 km/h; 20.4 mph) surfaced; 7.6 knots (14.1 km/h; 8.7 mph) submerged
- Range: 8,500 nmi (15,700 km; 9,800 mi) at 10 knots (19 km/h; 12 mph) surfaced; 80 nmi (150 km; 92 mi) at 4 knots (7.4 km/h; 4.6 mph) submerged
- Test depth: 230 m (750 ft); Crush depth: 250–295 m (820–968 ft)
- Complement: 4 officers, 40–56 enlisted
- Armament: 5 × torpedo tubes (four bow, one stern); 14 × 53.3 cm (21 in) torpedoes or 26 TMA mines; 1 × 8.8 cm (3.46 in) deck gun (220 rounds); 2 × twin 2 cm (0.79 in) C/30 anti-aircraft guns

Service record
- Part of: 5th U-boat Flotilla; 6 April – 30 September 1943; 6th U-boat Flotilla; 1 October 1943 – 18 July 1944
- Identification codes: M 51 135
- Commanders: Oblt.z.S. Ulf Lawaetz; 6 April 1943 – 18 July 1944
- Operations: 4 patrols: 1st patrol: 13 November 1943 – 15 January 1944; 2nd patrol: 24 February – 12 May 1944; 3rd patrol: 28 June – 1 July 1944; 4th patrol: 6 – 18 July 1944
- Victories: None

German submarine U-672 was a Type VIIC U-boat of Nazi Germany's Kriegsmarine during World War II. The submarine was laid down on 24 December 1941 at the Howaldtswerke yard at Hamburg, launched on 27 February 1943, and commissioned on 6 April 1943 under the command of Oberleutnant zur See Ulf Lawaetz.

Attached to 5th U-boat Flotilla based at Kiel, U-672 completed her training period on 30 September 1943 and was assigned to front-line service.

== Design ==
German Type VIIC submarines were preceded by the shorter Type VIIB submarines. U-672 had a displacement of 769 tonnes (757 long tons) when at the surface and 871 tonnes (857 long tons) while submerged. She had a total length of 67.10 m (220 ft 2 in), a pressure hull length of 50.50 m (165 ft 8 in), a beam of 6.20 m (20 ft 4 in), a height of 9.60 m (31 ft 6 in), and a draught of 4.74 m (15 ft 7 in). The submarine was powered by two Germaniawerft F46 four-stroke, six-cylinder supercharged diesel engines producing a total of 2,800 to 3,200 metric horsepower (2,060 to 2,350 kW; 2,760 to 3,160 shp) for use while surfaced, two Siemens-Schuckert GU 343/38–8 double-acting electric motors producing a total of 750 metric horsepower (550 kW; 740 shp) for use while submerged. She had two shafts and two 1.23 m (4 ft) propellers. The boat was capable of operating at depths of up to 230 metres (750 ft).

The submarine had a maximum surface speed of 17.7 knots (32.8 km/h; 20.4 mph) and a maximum submerged speed of 7.6 knots (14.1 km/h; 8.7 mph). When submerged, the boat could operate for 80 nautical miles (150 km; 92 mi) at 4 knots (7.4 km/h; 4.6 mph); when surfaced, she could travel 8,500 nautical miles (15,700 km; 9,800 mi) at 10 knots (19 km/h; 12 mph). U-672 was fitted with five 53.3 cm (21 in) torpedo tubes (four fitted at the bow and one at the stern), fourteen torpedoes, one 8.8 cm (3.46 in) SK C/35 naval gun, 220 rounds, and two twin 2 cm (0.79 in) C/30 anti-aircraft guns. The boat had a complement of between forty-four and sixty.

== Service history ==
On the fourth and final war patrol, U-672 was attacked by the British frigate Balfour north of Guernsey and heavily damaged on 18 July 1944. Forced to surface, the crew abandoned ship and scuttled the U-boat. All 52 crew members survived and were picked up the next day by British life-boats.

== New discovery ==
After more than 82 years divers found the location of the submarine U-672 off the Devon coast in August 2026. Divers discovered her 37 km (20 nmi) off the coast of Salcombe, England, at a depth of almost 70 m (230 ft).

== Bibliography ==
- Busch, Rainer; Röll, Hans-Joachim (1999a). German U-boat commanders of World War II : a biographical dictionary. Translated by Brooks, Geoffrey. London, Annapolis, Md: Greenhill Books, Naval Institute Press. ISBN 1-55750-186-6.
- Busch, Rainer; Röll, Hans-Joachim (1999b). Der U-Boot-Krieg, 1939-1945: Deutsche U-Boot-Verluste von September 1939 bis Mai 1945 [German U-boat losses from September 1939 to May 1945] (in German). Vol. IV. Hamburg, Berlin, Bonn: Mittler. ISBN 3-8132-0514-2.
- Gröner, Eric; Jung, Dieter; Maass, Martin (1991). German Warships 1815-1945: U-boats and Mine Warfare Vessels. Vol. 2. Translated by Thomas, Keith; Magowan, Rachel. London: Conway Maritime Press. ISBN 0-85177-593-4.
