= German submarine U-420 =

German World War II submarine

- U-995, a Type VIIC U-boat at the German naval memorial at Laboe which was almost identical to U-420

History

Nazi Germany
- Name: U-420
- Ordered: 20 January 1941
- Builder: Danziger Werft AG, Danzig
- Yard number: 121
- Laid down: 3 December 1941
- Launched: 18 August 1942
- Commissioned: 16 December 1942
- Fate: Missing in the North Atlantic since 20 October 1943

General characteristics
- Class & type: Type VIIC submarine
- Displacement: 769 tonnes (757 long tons) surfaced; 871 t (857 long tons) submerged
- Length: 67.10 m (220 ft 2 in) o/a; 50.50 m (165 ft 8 in) pressure hull
- Beam: 6.20 m (20 ft 4 in) o/a; 4.70 m (15 ft 5 in) pressure hull
- Height: 9.60 m (31 ft 6 in)
- Draught: 4.74 m (15 ft 7 in)
- Installed power: 2,800–3,200 PS (2,100–2,400 kW; 2,800–3,200 bhp) (diesels); 750 PS (550 kW; 740 shp) (electric)
- Propulsion: 2 shafts; 2 × diesel engines; 2 × electric motors
- Speed: 17.7 knots (32.8 km/h; 20.4 mph) surfaced; 7.6 knots (14.1 km/h; 8.7 mph) submerged
- Range: 8,500 nmi (15,700 km; 9,800 mi) at 10 knots (19 km/h; 12 mph) surfaced; 80 nmi (150 km; 92 mi) at 4 knots (7.4 km/h; 4.6 mph) submerged
- Test depth: 230 m (750 ft); Crush depth: 250–295 m (820–968 ft)
- Complement: 4 officers, 40–56 enlisted
- Armament: 5 × 53.3 cm (21 in) torpedo tubes (four bow, one stern); 14 × torpedoes; 1 × 8.8 cm (3.46 in) deck gun (220 rounds); 2 × twin 2 cm (0.79 in) C/30 anti-aircraft guns

Service record
- Part of: 8th U-boat Flotilla; 16 December 1942 – 30 June 1943; 11th U-boat Flotilla; 1 July – 20 October 1943
- Identification codes: M 49 312
- Commanders: Oblt.z.S. Hans-Jürgen Reese; 16 December 1942 – 20 October 1943
- Operations: 2 patrols: 1st patrol: a. 12 June – 16 July 1943; b. 7 – 8 October 1943; 2nd patrol: 9 – 20 October 1943
- Victories: None

German submarine U-420 was a Type VIIC U-boat built for the Kriegsmarine for service during World War II. She was laid down in the Danziger Werft as yard number 121, launched on 18 August 1942 and commissioned on 16 December the same year under Oberleutnant zur See Peter Högqvist. She then joined the 8th U-boat Flotilla for training before transferring to the 11th flotilla for operations.

== Design ==
German Type VIIC submarines were preceded by the shorter Type VIIB submarines. U-420 had a displacement of 769 tonnes (757 long tons) when at the surface and 871 tonnes (857 long tons) while submerged. She had a total length of 67.10 m (220 ft 2 in), a pressure hull length of 50.50 m (165 ft 8 in), a beam of 6.20 m (20 ft 4 in), a height of 9.60 m (31 ft 6 in), and a draught of 4.74 m (15 ft 7 in). The submarine was powered by two Germaniawerft F46 four-stroke, six-cylinder supercharged diesel engines producing a total of 2,800 to 3,200 metric horsepower (2,060 to 2,350 kW; 2,760 to 3,160 shp) for use while surfaced, two Siemens-Schuckert GU 343/38–8 double-acting electric motors producing a total of 750 metric horsepower (550 kW; 740 shp) for use while submerged. She had two shafts and two 1.23 m (4 ft) propellers. The boat was capable of operating at depths of up to 230 metres (750 ft).

The submarine had a maximum surface speed of 17.7 knots (32.8 km/h; 20.4 mph) and a maximum submerged speed of 7.6 knots (14.1 km/h; 8.7 mph). When submerged, the boat could operate for 80 nautical miles (150 km; 92 mi) at 4 knots (7.4 km/h; 4.6 mph); when surfaced, she could travel 8,500 nautical miles (15,700 km; 9,800 mi) at 10 knots (19 km/h; 12 mph). U-420 was fitted with five 53.3 cm (21 in) torpedo tubes (four fitted at the bow and one at the stern), fourteen torpedoes, one 8.8 cm (3.46 in) SK C/35 naval gun, 220 rounds, and two twin 2 cm (0.79 in) C/30 anti-aircraft guns. The boat had a complement of between forty-four and sixty.

== Service history ==
=== First patrol ===
U-420's first patrol involved her leaving Kiel on 12 June 1943 and arriving at Lorient in occupied France on 16 June 1943, having hugged the Norwegian coast and sailed around the north of Scotland. She then crossed the Atlantic, but was attacked on 3 July by a Canadian B-24 Liberator. The boat was hit by a Fido homing torpedo which killed two men and wounded a third. The boat sustained enough damage to force the patrol to be cut short.

=== Second patrol and loss ===
Following a short transit voyage from Lorient to Brest, U-420 set off on her second patrol on 9 October 1943. After 20 October, she was never heard from again and her fate remains an unsolved mystery.

=== Previously recorded fate ===
A postwar assessment stated that U-420 was sunk on October 26, 1943 in the North Atlantic at position 50°49′N 41°01′W by depth charges from a Canadian B-24 Liberator of RCAF Squadron 10/A. This attack was actually against U-91, inflicting no damage.

== Bibliography ==
- Busch, Rainer; Röll, Hans-Joachim (1999). German U-boat commanders of World War II : a biographical dictionary. Translated by Brooks, Geoffrey. London, Annapolis, Md: Greenhill Books, Naval Institute Press. ISBN 1-55750-186-6.
- Busch, Rainer; Röll, Hans-Joachim (1999). Deutsche U-Boot-Verluste von September 1939 bis Mai 1945 [German U-boat losses from September 1939 to May 1945]. Der U-Boot-Krieg (in German). Vol. IV. Hamburg, Berlin, Bonn: Mittler. ISBN 3-8132-0514-2.
- Gröner, Erich; Jung, Dieter; Maass, Martin (1991). U-boats and Mine Warfare Vessels. German Warships 1815–1945. Vol. 2. Translated by Thomas, Keith; Magowan, Rachel. London: Conway Maritime Press. ISBN 0-85177-593-4.
