= HMS Affleck =

Frigate of the Royal Navy

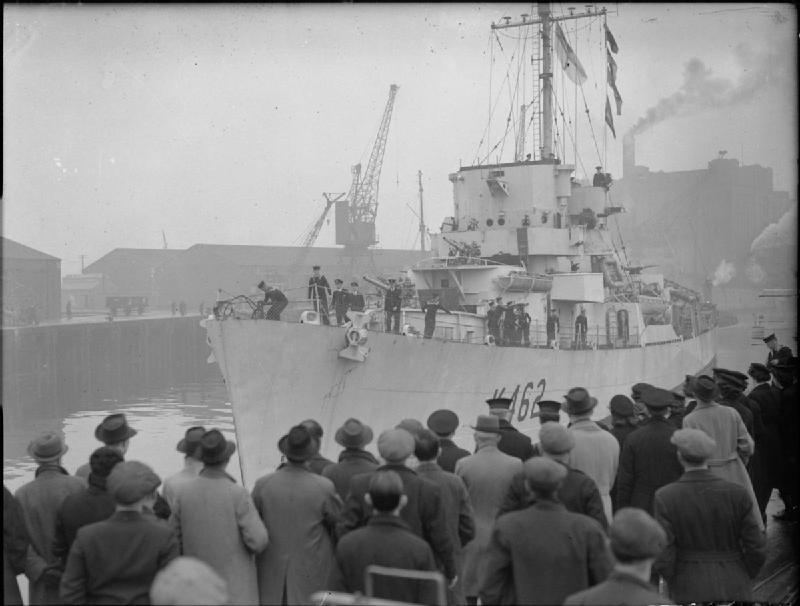

History

United States
- Name: Oswald
- Builder: Bethlehem Hingham Shipyard
- Laid down: 5 April 1943
- Launched: 30 June 1943
- Out of service: Assigned to the Royal Navy June 1943.
- Reinstated: Returned August 1945.
- Fate: Sold into mercantile service 24 January 1947.

United Kingdom
- Name: Affleck
- Commissioned: 29 September 1943
- Fate: Returned to the United States Navy in August 1945

General characteristics
- Class & type: Captain-class frigate
- Displacement: 1,800 tons fully loaded
- Length: 306 ft (93 m) overall
- Beam: 36.5 ft (11.1 m)
- Draught: 11 ft (3.4 m) fully loaded
- Speed: 24 knots (44 km/h)
- Endurance: 5,500 nautical miles (10,190 km) at 15 knots (28 km/h)
- Complement: Typically between 170 & 180

HMS Affleck was a Captain-class frigate which served during World War II. The ship was named after Sir Edmund Affleck, commander of HMS Bedford at the Moonlight Battle in 1780 during the American Revolutionary War.

Originally destined for the US Navy as a turbo-electric (TE) type Buckley-class destroyer escort, HMS Affleck was provisionally given the name USS Oswald (later this name was reassigned to DE-767). However, the delivery was diverted to the Royal Navy before the launch.

== Description ==
The Buckley-class ships had an overall length of 306 feet (93.3 m), a beam of 37 feet (11.3 m), and a draught of 11 feet 3 inches (3.4 m) at full load. They displaced 1,430 long tons (1,450 t) at (standard) and 1,823 long tons (1,852 t) at full load. The ships had a turbo-electric powertrain with two Foster Wheeler Express D boilers providing steam to a pair of General Electric steam turbines which drove two electric generators which sent electricity to two 6,000-shaft-horsepower (4,500 kW) electric motors which drove the two propeller shafts. The destroyer escorts reached a speed of 24 knots (44 km/h; 28 mph) and had enough fuel oil to give them a range of 6,000 nautical miles (11,000 km; 6,900 mi) at 12 knots (22 km/h; 14 mph). Their crew consisted of 220 officers and ratings.

The armament of the Buckley-class ships in British service consisted of three single mounts for 50-caliber 3-inch (76 mm)/50 Mk 22 dual-purpose guns; one superfiring pair forward of the bridge and the third gun aft of the superstructure. Anti-aircraft defence was intended to consisted of a twin-gun mount for 40-millimetre (1.6 in) Bofors anti-aircraft (AA) guns atop the rear superstructure with eight 20-millimetre (0.8 in) Oerlikon AA guns located on the superstructure, but production shortages meant that that not all guns were fitted, or that two additional Oerlikons replaced the Bofors guns. A Mark 10 Hedgehog anti-submarine mortar was positioned just behind the forward gun. The ships were also equipped with two depth charge rails at the stern and four "K-gun" depth charge throwers.

== Actions ==
HMS Affleck served exclusively with the 1st Escort Group taking part in operations in the North Atlantic, off Normandy, and in the English Channel.

On 19 February 1944, together with HMS Bentley, HMS Affleck picked up 54 survivors from the Panamanian merchant Colin which had been torpedoed and sunk the previous day in the North Atlantic in position 54°16′N 31°58′W by the German submarine U-859.

On 26 February 1944 in the North Atlantic at position 49°45′N 26°20′W HMS Affleck, together with HMS Gore and HMS Gould, sank U-91 by the use of depth charges and then by use of main guns. When the damaged U-boat surfaced and tried to ram HMS Affleck, this action resulted in 36 dead and 16 survivors from U-91's crew.

On 1 March 1944 in the Northern Atlantic north of the Azores at position 45°46′N 23°16′W HMS Affleck together with HMS Gore, HMS Gould and HMS Garlies sank U-358 by the use of depth charges, resulting in 50 dead and 1 survivor from the submarine's crew.

On 16 March 1944 in the Straits of Gibraltar at position 35°55′N 05°41′W HMS Affleck together with the destroyer HMS Vanoc and three US Catalina aircraft (VP 63) sank U-392 by the use of a hedgehog attack, resulting in 52 dead (all hands) from U-392's crew.

On 25 June 1944 HMS Affleck with HMS Balfour attacked a submarine believed to be U-1191 by the use of depth charges, this resulted in the sinking of the submarine with the loss of all hands. This action took place 25 nautical miles (46 km) south of Start Point. The Kriegsmarine had U-1191 listed as missing (no radio contact) since 12 June 1944.

On 26 December 1944 at 14:14 off the French coast near Cherbourg, U-486 launched three acoustic torpedoes at the 1st Escort Group hitting Affleck and HMS Capel. This resulted in the sinking of Capel. Affleck was towed to port, where the ship was written off as a Constructive Total Loss.

== Return to United States Navy ==
Affleck was returned to the US Navy in August 1945 in Britain, where she was sold on 24 January 1947 to the Lisbon-based Transcontinental Victory Commercial Corporation Ltd. She was renamed Nostra De La Luz and survived as a hulk until the 1970s.

== General information ==
- Pennant (UK): K 462
- Pennant (US): DE 71
