= HMS Balfour =

Frigate of the Royal Navy

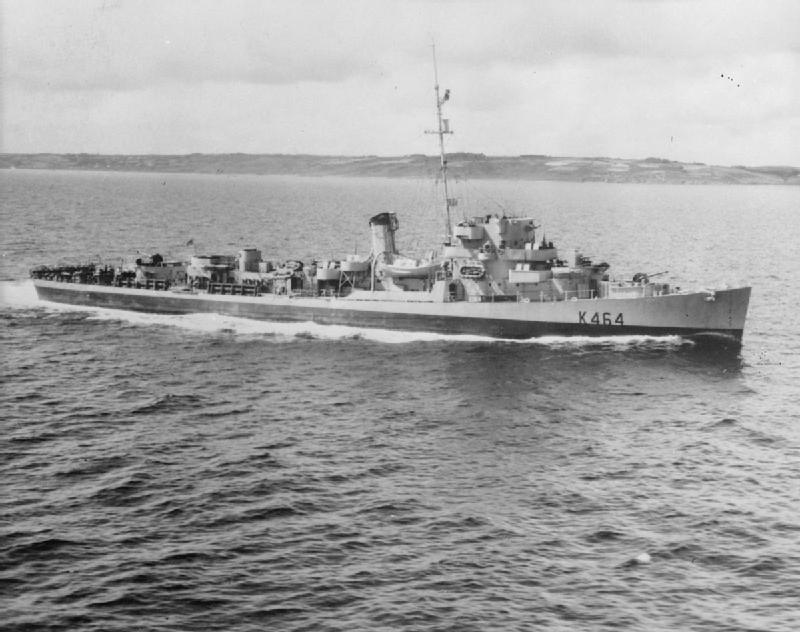

History

United Kingdom
- Builder: Bethlehem Hingham Shipyard
- Laid down: 19 April 1943
- Launched: 10 July 1943
- Commissioned: 17 October 1943
- Decommissioned: Returned to US Navy on 25 October 1945
- Fate: Sold for scrap 28 October 1946

General characteristics
- Class & type: Captain-class frigate
- Displacement: 1,800 long tons (1,829 t) (fully loaded)
- Length: 306 ft (93 m) overall
- Beam: 36.5 ft (11.1 m)
- Draught: 11 ft (3.4 m) fully loaded
- Speed: 24 knots (44 km/h)
- Range: 5,500 nautical miles (10,190 km) at 15 knots (28 km/h)
- Complement: Typically between 170 & 180

HMS Balfour was a Captain-class frigate of the Royal Navy which served during World War II. She was built as a TE (Buckley) type destroyer escort in the United States and delivered to the Royal Navy under the Lend-Lease arrangement.

== Construction and design ==
The Buckley class was one of six classes of destroyer escorts built for the US Navy to meet the massive demand for escort vessels following the United States's entry into World War Two. While basically similar, the different classes were fitted with different propulsion gear and armament. The Buckleys had a turbo-electric drive, and a main gun armament of 3-inch guns.

The Buckley- (or TE) class ships were 306 feet (93.27 m) long overall and 300 feet (91.44 m) between perpendiculars, with a beam of 37 feet (11.28 m) and a mean draught of 11 feet 3 inches (3.43 m). Displacement was 1,430 long tons (1,450 t) standard and 1,823 long tons (1,852 t) full load. Two boilers fed steam to steam turbines which drove electrical generators, which in turn powered electric motors that propelled the ship. The machinery was rated at 12,000 shaft horsepower (8,900 kW), giving a speed of 23 knots (26 mph; 43 km/h). 359 long tons (365 t) of oil was carried, giving a range of 6,000 nautical miles (6,900 mi; 11,000 km) at 12 knots (14 mph; 22 km/h).

The ship's main gun armament consisted of three 3-inch (76 mm) 50 caliber dual-purpose (i.e. anti-surface and anti-aircraft) guns, two forward and one aft, in open mounts. Close in armament consisted of two 40 mm Bofors guns, backed by eight single Oerlikon 20 mm cannon. A triple mount of 21-inch (533 mm) torpedo tubes provided a capability against larger ships, while anti-submarine armament consisted of a Hedgehog forward-firing anti-submarine mortar and four depth charge throwers and two depth charge rails. Crew was 200 officers and other ranks.

The ship, which was originally planned to become USS McAnn with the hull number DE-73, was laid down on 19 April 1943 at Bethlehem Shipbuilding Corporation's Hingham Shipyard, in Hingham, Massachusetts. DE-73 was re-allocated to Great Britain under the Lend-Lease programme on 10 June 1943. The ship was launched on 10 July 1943, with the name HMS Balfour (Note: Balfour was named after George Balfour, the commander of the ship of the line HMS Conqueror at the Battle of the Saintes during the American Revolutionary War.) (Note: The name McAnn was reassigned to USS McAnn.) and commissioned on 7 October 1943, with the pennant number K464.

== Actions ==
HMS Balfour served with both the 1st Escort Group and 18th Escort Group earning battle honours for service in the North Atlantic, off Normandy and in the English Channel.

In February 1944, Balfour was part of the 1st Support Group, supporting convoys to the west of Ireland. In June 1944, the Allies invaded Normandy, and the 1st Escort Group, including Balfour, was one of six Escort Groups deployed to form a barrier about 130 miles west of Lands End to prevent German U-boats based in the French Atlantic ports from interfering with the landings. These Escort Groups were later moved into the Channel, and on 25 June 1944 the 1st Escort Group was searching south east of Torquay for a submarine that had torpedoed the frigate Goodson when Balfour detected a sonar contact. Balfour attacked with Hedgehog, which resulted in several explosions and a slick of oil. Balfour and sister ship Affleck then followed up with depth charges. At the time, the two frigates were credited with sinking U-1191 with the loss of all hands. The Kriegsmarine had U-1191 listed as missing (no radio contact) since 12 June 1944. The Admiralty later withdrew the credit for sinking U-1191, declaring that the cause of that submarine's loss was unknown. Other sources indicate that Balfour and Affleck had attacked the wreck of the submarine U-269, sank earlier the same day, and that U-1191 was sunk by British destroyers and frigates on 3 July.

On the afternoon of 18 July 1944, Balfour attacked the submarine U-672 with depth charges. (Note: Blair claims the attack used Hedgehog.) Although U-672 managed to slip away from Balfour, she was badly damaged, and early on 19 July, the submarine surfaced and was scuttled by its commanding officer. All hands (52 crew and officers) were rescued and spent the rest of the war as prisoners of war. This action took place in the English Channel north of Guernsey at position 50°03′N 02°30′W.

In December 1944, Balfour was Senior Officer's ship in the 18th Escort Group, operating out of Greenock. On 10 January 1945 Cdr C Gwinner assumed command. By March–April 1945, Balfour had returned to the 1st Escort Group, operating out of Portsmouth against German submarines in the Channel.

== Disposal ==
Post war, Balfour was returned to the United States under command of Lieutenant Commander J.D.Davey, transferring back to the US Navy at New York on 25 October 1945, and keeping the name Balfour. She was sold on 28 October 1946.
