= SS Harry Luckenbach =

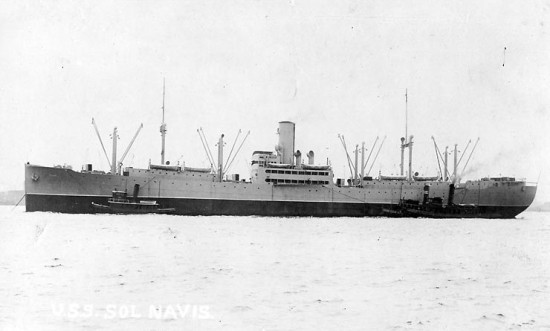
- SS Harry Luckenbach

History
- Name: Sol Navis (1919—1920 ); Harry Luckenbach (1920—1943)
- Owner: United States Shipping Board (1919—1920); Luckenbach Steamship Company (1920—1943)
- Operator: U.S. Navy (1919); United States Shipping Board (1919—1920); Luckenbach Steamship Company (1920—1943)
- Port of registry: Philadelphia, Pennsylvania
- Builder: Sun Shipbuilding and Dry Dock Co.
- Yard number: 10
- Launched: 9 February 1919
- Acquired: 7 July 1919
- In service: 1919-1943
- Identification: U.S. Official number: 218157; Signal: LRHP
- Fate: Sunk, 17 March 1943
- Notes: Commissioned U.S. Navy 7 July 1919—22 October 1919

General characteristics
- Type: Cargo
- Tonnage: 8,713 GRT, 5,489 NRT (1919—1920); 6,366 GRT, 3,929 NRT (1943)
- Displacement: 6,366 long tons (6,468 t)
- Length: 448 ft 7 in (136.73 m) LOA; 448.9 ft (136.8 m) (registry)
- Beam: 60.2 ft (18.3 m)
- Draft: 37.7 ft (11.5 m)
- Depth: 28.2 ft (8.6 m); 37.8 ft (11.5 m) (to main deck)
- Decks: 2 with shelter deck
- Propulsion: 4 × De Laval steam turbine engines SR geared to two screw shafts, 4 water tube boilers, 968 nhp
- Speed: 13.5 knots (25.0 km/h; 15.5 mph)
- Crew: 50–53
- Notes: 1919 armament: 1 × 3-inch gun, 1 × 4-inch gun, 8 × 20 mm guns

SS Harry Luckenbach, was a cargo ship ordered by the Luckenbach Steamship Company and built at Sun Shipbuilding and Drydock Co. in Chester, Pennsylvania in 1919. The ship was requisitioned by the United States Shipping Board (USSB) before completion and converted to a troop transport. The USSB allocated the ship, which had been fitted out with temporary troop accommodation in its cargo spaces, to the Navy which commissioned the ship on 7 July 1919 as USS Sol Navis with the Identification number 4031A. The ship was decommissioned October 1919 after two trips to France.

In 1920 Luckenbach Steamship purchased the ship and operated it commercially as Harry Luckenbach in intercoastal trade. In April 1942 the ship was turned over to the War Shipping Administration (WSA) with the company assigned as the WSA operating agent. On 17 March 1943 she was sunk by the German U-boat U-91 with loss of all eighty persons aboard.

== Construction ==
The yet unnamed ship was the last of four sister ships ordered by the Luckenbach Steamship Company from the Sun Shipbuilding and Drydock Co., Chester, Pennsylvania. (Note: The four sister ships were, in order with hull numbers and U.S. Official Number: hull #5, O/N 217562, prospective name M.E. Luckenbach, completed as USSB ship South Bend, purchased 1922 renamed J.L. Luckenbach (not to be confused with 1886 ex-Saale), sold foreign 1948; hull #6, O/N 217859, prospective name Jacob Luckenbach, completed as USSB ship Marcia, purchased 1922 renamed Lillian Luckenbach, sunk collision 27 March 1943; hull #9, O/N 218199, no prospective name, completed as USSB ship Edellyn, purchased 1922 renamed Dorothy Luckenbach, U.S. Army Hospital Ship Ernestine Koranda (1944—1950), U.S. MARAD until scrapped 1957; hull #10, O/N 218157, this ship.) The United States Shipping Board (USSB) requisitioned all merchant ships under construction or on order in American shipyards for emergency World War I service on 3 August 1917. Yard hull number 10 was launched on 9 February 1919, completed in July 1919 as Sol Navis, U.S. Official Number 218157 and delivered to the USSB on 7 July 1919. The USSB assigned the ship to the U.S. Navy which on delivery 7 July 1919 commissioned the ship as Sol Navis with the Identification Number 4031A.

Sol Navis was registered as a freighter with signal LRHP at 8,713 GRT, 5,489 NRT, 448.9 ft (136.8 m) registry length, 60.2 ft (18.3 m) beam and 28.2 ft (8.6 m) depth, 5,000 i.h.p., a crew of 50 at Philadelphia. The 1920 Lloyd's Register of Ships shows the same tonnage with additional information of two steel decks with shelter deck, 37.8 ft (11.5 m) depth to main deck, four boilers and four geared turbines driving twin screws and owner USSB.

== U.S. Navy service ==
Sol Navis had been fitted out with temporary troop accommodations and was assigned to the Cruiser and Transport Force assigned to bring soldiers home from Europe at the end of World War I. The ship departed Philadelphia on 12 July 1919 for Brest, France arriving and anchoring in the harbor on 23 July 1919. Troops were ferried to the anchored ship which departed 13 August with 30 Army officers and 846 enlisted men arriving at the Hoboken Port of Embarkation on 23 August. The ship made a second trip, departing Hoboken 4 September 1919 and anchoring at Brest 13 September. After embarking 67 officers, 1,699 soldiers, one civilian and 100 Sailors for a total of 1,867 passengers on 16 September the ship sailed arriving at the Port of Embarkation's Bush Terminal (Note: The WW I Bush Terminal facilities were leased. Brooklyn was later the site of the massive Brooklyn Army Terminal, the core of the WW II New York Port of Embarkation.) in Brooklyn on 26 September after a night at the quarantine anchorage off Staten Island.

Sol Navis was put into drydock for repairs at Robins Dry Dock and Repair Company, Erie Basin, Brooklyn on 9 October 1919. Having completed he mission the Navy decommissioned her on 22 October 1919. There had been some intent to transfer the ship to the War Department (Army) but the ship was immediately returned to the USSB upon decommissioning.

== Commercial service ==
In 1920 the Luckenbach Steamship Company purchased the ship from the USSB renaming the ship Harry Luckenbach operating it commercially until sunk in World War II.

Schedules during the 1930s show the ship, along with many other of the line's ships on an intercoastal service between Boston and Seattle with port calls at cites between those locations. In April 1941 the line announced a number of its ships would be diverted, alternately, from the intercoastal routes to Manila, Hong Kong, Singapore, Penang and the Dutch East Indies to "assist in the movement of essential foreign commodities.” While on those voyages the ships would be under charter to American President Lines. Harry Luckenbach was the second ship to be so diverted scheduled to leave San Pedro, California on 26 May 1941.

== World War II ==
The company turned the ship over to the War Shipping Administration (WSA) at Mobile, Alabama on 20 April 1942. WSA retained Luckenbach Steamship Company as its operating agent with operations under a WSA/Army Transportation Corps Agreement (TCA).

Harry Luckenbach was in Convoy HX 229, assigned station #111, from New York City to the United Kingdom. That station, leading the left column, (Note: Lead ship in the left column. See diagram Figure 7-2, Column and lane numbering, page 7-5.) was considered exposed and the ship had to be recalled to the position when the master independently zig-zagged ahead of the convoy. The ship was hit early in the morning of 17 March 1943 about 400 nmi (460 mi; 740 km) off of Cape Farewell, Greenland (50°38′N 34°46′W) by torpedoes fired by the German submarine U-91 midship on her starboard side in the machinery room. The ship sank in about three minutes and survivors were sighted. HMS Pennywort had already picked up 108 survivors and could not take on more. HMS Anemone was ordered to find and rescue the survivors but failed to find them. The entire crew of 54 seaman and 26 Naval Armed Guard were lost.

== Successor ship ==
In November 1949 the C3-S-A2 ship Sea Devil built by Western Steel, San Francisco, in 1943 was purchased by Luckenbach Steamship Company and renamed Harry Luckenbach. That ship, sold in 1959, was scrapped in 1973 as Copper State.
