= German submarine U-1191 =

German World War II submarine

- Type VIIC submarine U-570 which looked almost identical to U-1191.

History

Nazi Germany
- Name: U-1191
- Ordered: 25 August 1941
- Builder: F Schichau, Danzig
- Yard number: 1561
- Laid down: 4 November 1942
- Launched: 6 July 1943
- Commissioned: 9 September 1943
- Fate: Sunk on 3 July 1944

General characteristics
- Class & type: Type VIIC submarine
- Displacement: 864.7 t (851 long tons) submerged
- Length: 67.10 m (220 ft 2 in) o/a; 50.50 m (165 ft 8 in) pressure hull
- Beam: 6.18 m (20 ft 3 in) o/a; 4.68 m (15 ft 4 in) pressure hull
- Height: 9.60 m (31 ft 6 in)
- Draught: 4.74 m (15 ft 7 in)
- Installed power: 2,800–3,200 PS (2,100–2,400 kW; 2,800–3,200 bhp) (diesels); 750 PS (550 kW; 740 shp) (electric)
- Propulsion: 2 shafts; 2 × 4-stroke M6V 40/46 Germaniawerft; 2 x 62 batteries; 2 x six-cylinder supercharged diesel engines; 2 × electric motors
- Speed: 17.6 knots (32.6 km/h; 20.3 mph) surfaced; 7.5 knots (13.9 km/h; 8.6 mph) submerged
- Range: 8,500 nmi (15,700 km; 9,800 mi) at 10 knots (19 km/h; 12 mph) surfaced; 80 nmi (150 km; 92 mi) at 4 knots (7.4 km/h; 4.6 mph) submerged
- Test depth: 220 m (720 ft); Crush depth: 250–295 m (820–968 ft)
- Complement: 50 crew
- Armament: 5 × 53.3 cm (21 in) torpedo tubes (four bow, one stern); 14 × torpedoes; 1 × 8.8 cm (3.46 in) deck gun (220 rounds); 1 × 3.7 cm (1.5 in) Flak M42 AA gun; 2 × twin 2 cm (0.79 in) C/30 anti-aircraft guns

Service record
- Part of: 8th U-boat Flotilla; 9 September 1943 – 30 April 1944; 7th U-boat Flotilla; 1 May – 3 July 1944
- Identification codes: M 52 991
- Commanders: Oblt.z.S. Peter Grau; 9 September 1943 – 3 July 1944
- Operations: 1 patrol: 22 May – 3 July 1944
- Victories: None

German submarine U-1191 was a Type VIIC U-boat of Nazi Germany's Kriegsmarine during World War II.

== Construction ==
The U-1191 was laid down on 4 November 1942 at the F Schichau shipyard in Danzig, Poland. She was launched on 6 July 1943 and commissioned on 9 September 1943 under the command of Oberleutnant zur See Peter Grau.

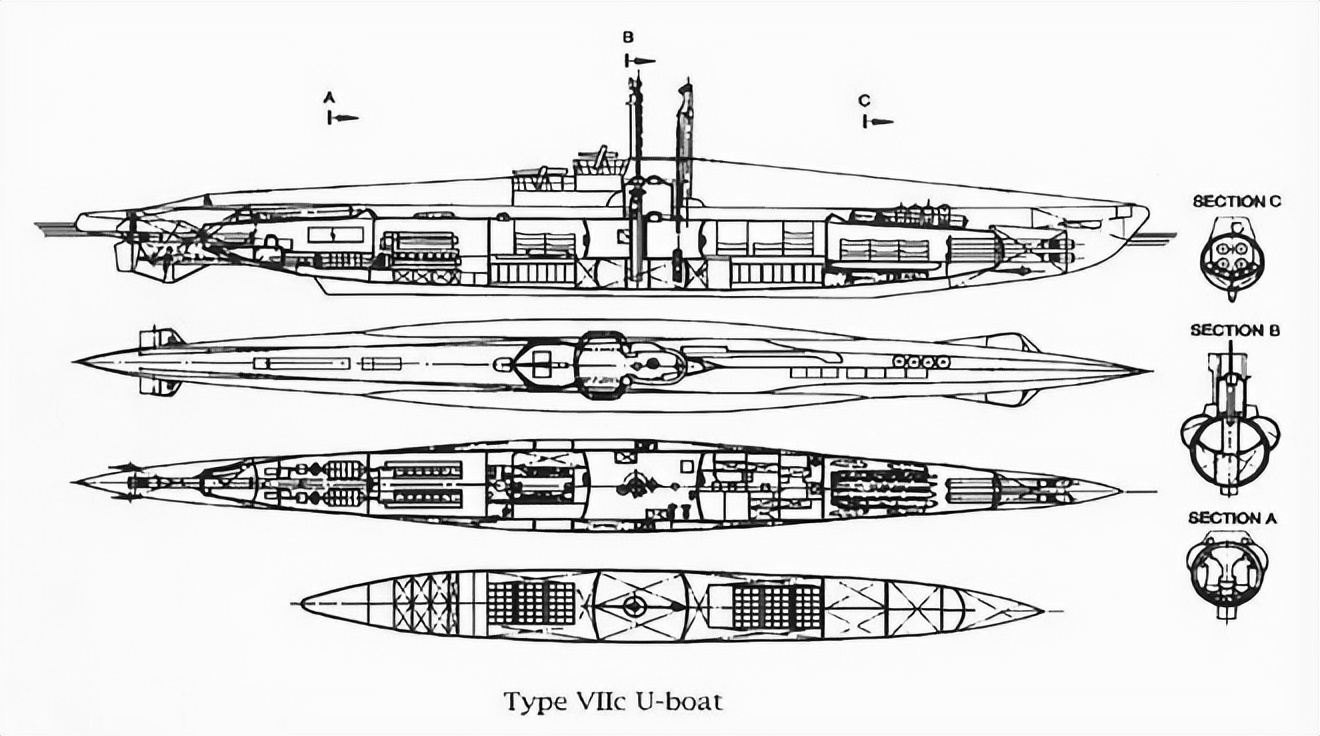
A cross-section of a Type VIIC U-boat.

When she was completed, the submarine was 67.10 metres (220 ft 2 in) long, with a beam of 6.18 metres (20 ft 3 in), a height of 9.60 metres (31 ft 6 in) and a draft of 4.74 metres (15 ft 7 in). She was assessed at 864.7 t (851 long tons) submerged. The submarine was powered by two Germaniawerft F46 four-stroke, six-cylinder supercharged diesel engines producing a total of 2,800 to 3,200 metric horsepower (2,060 to 2,350 kW; 2,760 to 3,160 shp) for use while surfaced and two AEG GU 460/8-276 double-acting electric motors producing a total of 750 metric horsepower (550 kW; 740 shp) for use while submerged. She had two shafts and two 1.23 m (4 ft) propellers. The submarine was capable of operating at depths of up to 230 metres (750 ft), had a maximum surface speed of 17.6 knots (32.6 km/h; 20.3 mph) and a maximum submerged speed of 7.5 knots (13.9 km/h; 8.6 mph).When submerged, the U-boat could operate for 80 nautical miles (150 km; 92 mi) at 4 knots (7.4 km/h; 4.6 mph) and when surfaced, she could travel 8,500 nautical miles (15,700 km; 9,800 mi) at 10 knots (19 km/h; 12 mph).

The submarine was fitted with five 53.3 cm (21 in) torpedo tubes (four fitted at the bow and one at the stern), fourteen torpedoes, one 8.8 cm (3.46 in) deck gun (220 rounds), one 3.7 cm (1.5 in) Flak M42 and two twin 2 cm (0.79 in) C/30 anti-aircraft guns. The boat had a complement of 44 to 57 men.

== Service history ==
U-1191 was used as a Training ship in the 8th U-boat Flotilla from 9 September 1943 until 30 April 1944, before serving in the 7th U-boat Flotilla for active service on 1 May 1944. She was fitted with a Schnorchel underwater-breathing apparatus in April 1944.

== Patrol and loss ==
During her active service, U-1191 made 1 patrol. She left Stavanger with 50 crew on 22 May 1944 for her first patrol and patrolled the North Atlantic, North of the Faroe Islands, West off the coast of Ireland and northwest of France.

On 3 July 1944 during her patrol in the English Channel, U-1191 was sunk by depth charges from the British frigates HMS Affleck and HMS Balfour southwest of Brighton, England, ending her first and only patrol during World War II after 43 days. All 50 crew members on board were lost. She was first listed as missing and it was thought that she had been sunk by a mine or by human error instead of by depth charges. In total U-1191 spent 50 days at sea.

== Wreck ==
The wreck of U-1191 was located in 1995 at a depth of 64 m (210 ft 0 in) and lay in nearly the same position as U-269 , which was sunk only days before U-1191's demise. The wreck is located at 50°03′N 02°59′W.

== Bibliography ==
- Busch, Rainer; Röll, Hans-Joachim (1999). German U-boat commanders of World War II : a biographical dictionary. Translated by Brooks, Geoffrey. London, Annapolis, Md: Greenhill Books, Naval Institute Press. ISBN 1-55750-186-6.
- Gröner, Erich; Jung, Dieter; Maass, Martin (1991). German Warships 1815–1945, U-boats and Mine Warfare Vessels. Vol. 2. Translated by Thomas, Keith; Magowan, Rachel. London: Conway Maritime Press. ISBN 0-85177-593-4.
