= SS Wentworth (1919) =

UK cargo steamship sunk in the Second World War

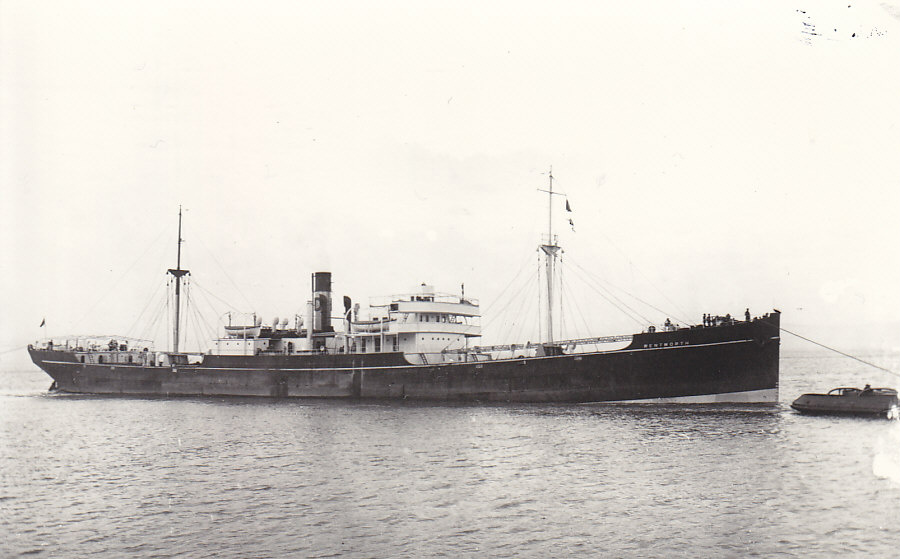
- Wentworth

History

United Kingdom
- Name: 1919: War Phlox; 1919: Wentworth
- Namesake: 1919: Phlox
- Owner: Dalgliesh Shipping Co
- Operator: RS Dalgliesh, Ltd
- Port of registry: Newcastle
- Builder: Richardson, Duck & Co, Stockton
- Yard number: 676
- Launched: 29 May 1919
- Completed: July 1919
- Identification: UK official number 142836; until 1934: code letters KCBR; by 1930: call sign GBCN
- Fate: Sunk by torpedo, 1943

General characteristics
- Class & type: War Standard Type A cargo ship
- Tonnage: 5,212 GRT, 3,210 NRT
- Length: 400.6 ft (122.1 m)
- Beam: 52.4 ft (16.0 m)
- Draught: 25 ft 3 in (7.70 m)
- Depth: 28.4 ft (8.7 m)
- Decks: 1
- Installed power: 514 NHP
- Propulsion: 1 × triple-expansion engine; 1 × screw
- Speed: 11 knots (20 km/h)
- Crew: 41 + 6 DEMS gunners
- Sensors & processing systems: by 1930: wireless direction finding

Wentworth was a British cargo steamship that was built in 1919 as War Phlox. The UK Shipping Controller ordered her, and she was built to War Standard design Type A. The Dalgliesh Shipping Company of Newcastle upon Tyne bought her when new, renamed her Wentworth, and owned her throughout her working life. She was sunk in the North Atlantic in 1943 during the Battle of the Atlantic, with the loss of five of her 47 crew.

She was not the first Dalgliesh ship to be called Wentworth. The company's previous Wentworth was launched in 1913 and sunk by a U-boat in 1917.

== Building ==
Richardson, Duck and Company of Stockton-on-Tees built the ship as yard number 676. She was launched on 29 May 1919 as War Phlox and completed that July. Her registered length was 400.6 ft (122.1 m), her beam was 52.4 ft (16.0 m), her depth was 28.4 ft (8.7 m) and her draught was 25 ft 3 in (7.70 m). Her tonnages were 5,212 GRT and 3,210 NRT.

She had a single screw, driven by a three-cylinder triple-expansion steam engine that was built by Blair and Company and rated at 514 NHP.

== Registration and identification ==
Dalgliesh gave most of its ships names ending with "–worth". They included Ashworth, Farnworth, Haworth, Kenilworth, Knebworth, Letchworth, Plawsworth, Usworth, and Warkworth as well as Wentworth. Dalgliesh changed War Phlox's name to Wentworth and registered her in Newcastle. Her UK official number was 142836 and her code letters were KCBR. By 1930 she had wireless direction finding, and her call sign was GBCN. By 1934 her call sign had superseded her code letters.

== Loss ==
In April 1943 Wentworth left Middlesbrough in ballast, bound for Cuba via New Jersey. Her Master was Captain Reginald Phillips. He commanded a crew of 40, plus six DEMS gunners: three Royal Navy and three British Army.

On 21 April Convoy ONS 5 left Liverpool for Halifax, Nova Scotia, and the next day Wentworth joined the convoy via Oban in western Scotland. U-boats wolf packs attacked ONS 5 from 27 April onward. The convoy lost only two ships until 5 May, when U-boats sank 11 ships in a single day, including Wentworth.

During the attack on 5 May U-358 fired one torpedo, which hit Wentworth's port side in her engine room and stokehold. Four men in the engine room were killed, and a fifth later drowned. Captain Phillips gave the order to abandon ship. Most of the crew got away quickly in three of her lifeboats. Phillips and a few others remained aboard until the ship started to break apart. They then got away in a fourth lifeboat.

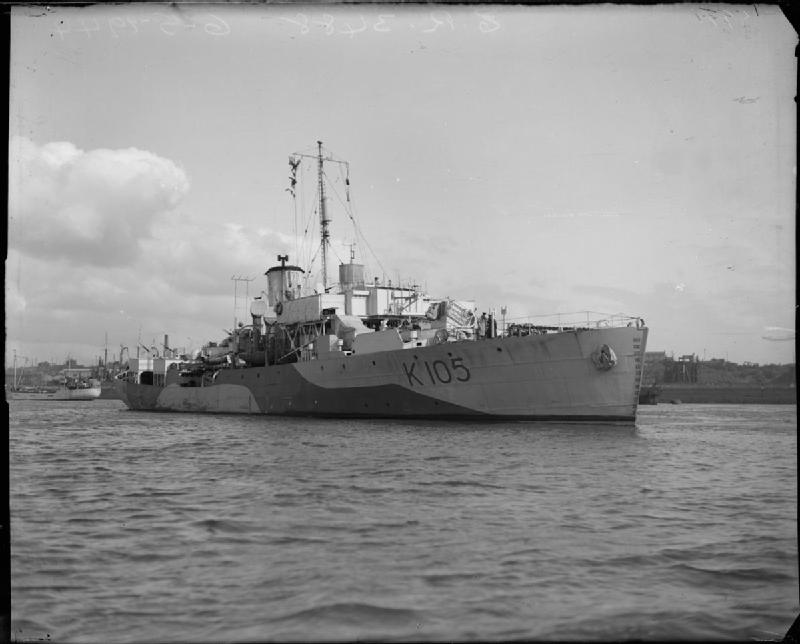
HMS Loosestrife

The corvette HMS Loosestrife rescued 42 survivors, including Captain Gilbert. Wentworth was still afloat, so Loosestrife tried unsuccessfully to scuttle her. Later U-628 sank Wentworth by gunfire at position 53°59′N 43°55′W. On 9 May Loosestrife landed the survivors at St. John's, Newfoundland.

== Bibliography ==
- Lloyd's Register of Shipping. Vol. II.–Steamers. London: Lloyd's Register of Shipping. 1920 – via Internet Archive.
- Lloyd's Register of Shipping (PDF). Vol. II.–Steamers and Motorships of 300 tons gross and over. London: Lloyd's Register of Shipping. 1930 – via Southampton City Council.
- Lloyd's Register of Shipping (PDF). Vol. II.–Steamers and Motorships of 300 tons gross and over. London: Lloyd's Register of Shipping. 1934 – via Southampton City Council.
- Mercantile Navy List. London. 1930 – via Crew List Index Project.
- Offley, Edward (2012). Turning the Tide: How a Small Band of Allied Sailors Defeated the U-Boats and Won the Battle of the Atlantic. New York: Basic Books. ISBN 978-0-465-03164-1.
- Syrett, David (1994). The Defeat of the German U-boats: The Battle of the Atlantic. Columbia: University of South Carolina Press. ISBN 978-0-87249-984-3 – via Internet Archive.
