= HMS Gore =

Frigate of the Royal Navy

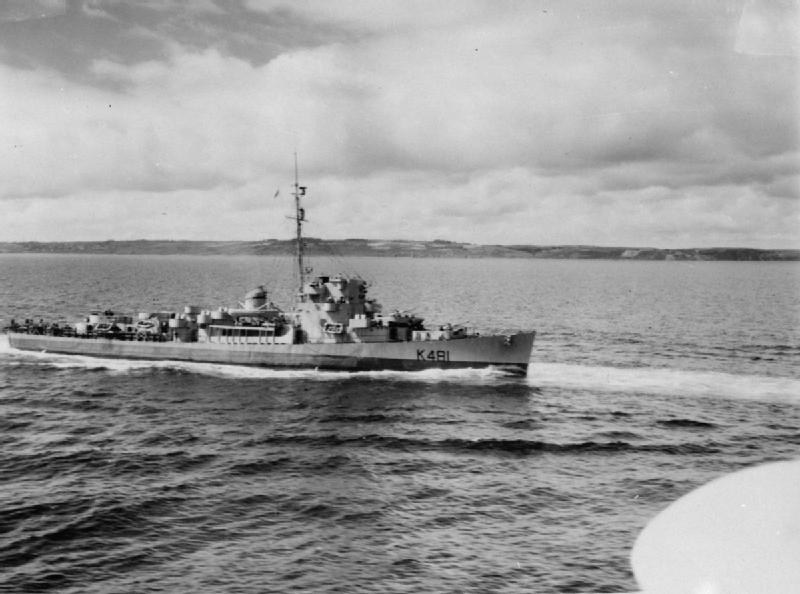
- HMS Gore on 11 August 1944.

History

United States
- Name: USS Herzog (DE-277)
- Namesake: U.S. Navy Lieutenant, junior grade, William Ralph Herzog (1909–1942), killed in action as commander of the Naval Armed Guard aboard SS Pan New York on 29 October 1942
- Ordered: 25 January 1942
- Builder: Boston Navy Yard, Boston, Massachusetts
- Laid down: 20 May 1943
- Launched: 8 July 1943
- Completed: 14 October 1943
- Fate: Transferred to United Kingdom 14 October 1943
- Acquired: Returned by United Kingdom 2 May 1946
- Fate: Sold 19 November 1946 or 10 June 1947 for scrapping

United Kingdom
- Name: HMS Gore (K481)
- Namesake: Admiral John Gore (1772–1836), British naval officer who was commanding officer of HMS Triton from 1796 to 1801
- Acquired: 14 October 1943
- Commissioned: 14 October 1943
- Fate: Returned to United States 2 May 1946

General characteristics
- Displacement: 1,140 long tons (1,158 t)
- Length: 289.5 ft (88.2 m)
- Beam: 35 ft (11 m)
- Draught: 9 ft (2.7 m)
- Propulsion: Four General Motors 278A 16-cylinder engines; GE 7,040 bhp (5,250 kW) generators (4,800 kW); GE electric motors for 6,000 shp (4,500 kW); Two shafts
- Speed: 20 knots (37 km/h)
- Range: 5,000 nautical miles (9,260 km) at 15 knots (28 km/h)
- Sensors & processing systems: SA & SL type radars; Type 144 series Asdic; MF Direction Finding antenna; HF Direction Finding Type FH 4 antenna
- Armament: 3 × 3 in (76 mm) /50 Mk.22 guns; 1 × twin Bofors 40 mm mount Mk.I; 7–16 × 20 mm Oerlikon guns; Mark 10 Hedgehog antisubmarine mortar; Depth charges; QF 2-pounder naval gun
- Notes: Pennant number K481

HMS Gore (K481) was a British Captain-class frigate of the Royal Navy in commission during World War II. Originally constructed as the United States Navy Evarts-class destroyer escort USS Herzog (DE-277), she served in the Royal Navy from 1943 to 1946.

== Construction and transfer ==
The ship was ordered on 25 January 1942 and laid down as USS Herzog (DE-277), the first ship of the name, by the Boston Navy Yard in Boston, Massachusetts, on 20 May 1943. She was launched on 8 July 1943. The United States transferred her to the United Kingdom under Lend-Lease on 14 October 1943.

== Service history ==
The ship was commissioned into service in the Royal Navy as HMS Gore (K481) on 14 October 1943 simultaneously with her transfer. She served on patrol and escort duty.

On 26 February 1944, Gore joined the British frigates HMS Affleck (K462) and HMS Gould (K476) in a depth-charge attack that sank the German submarine U-91 in the North Atlantic Ocean at position 49°45′00″N 026°20′00″W.

On 29 February 1944, Gore was operating as part of the First Escort Group when she, Affleck, Gould, and the British frigate HMS Garlies (K475) detected the German submarine U-358 in the North Atlantic north-northeast of the Azores and began a depth-charge attack which continued through the night and into 1 March 1944, the four frigates dropping a combined 104 depth charges. Gore and Garlies were forced to withdraw to Gibraltar to refuel on 1 March, but Affleck and Gould continued to attack U-358. During the afternoon of 1 March, U-358 succeeded in torpedoing and sinking Gould at position 45°46′00″N 023°16′00″W, but then was forced to surface after 38 hours submerged and was sunk by gunfire from Affleck at position 45°46′00″N 023°16′00″W.

The Royal Navy returned Gore to the U.S. Navy on 2 May 1946.

== Disposal ==
The U.S. Navy sold Gore on either 19 November 1946 or 10 June 1947 (sources vary) for scrapping.
