= German submarine U-91 (1941) =

German World War II submarine

History

Nazi Germany
- Name: U-91
- Ordered: 25 January 1939
- Builder: Flender Werke, Lübeck
- Yard number: 295
- Laid down: 12 November 1940
- Launched: 30 November 1941
- Commissioned: 28 January 1942
- Fate: Sunk, 26 February 1944

General characteristics
- Class & type: Type VIIC submarine
- Displacement: 769 tonnes (757 long tons) surfaced; 871 t (857 long tons) submerged
- Length: 67.10 m (220 ft 2 in) o/a; 50.50 m (165 ft 8 in) pressure hull
- Beam: 6.20 m (20 ft 4 in) o/a; 4.70 m (15 ft 5 in) pressure hull
- Height: 9.60 m (31 ft 6 in)
- Draught: 4.74 m (15 ft 7 in)
- Installed power: 2,800–3,200 PS (2,100–2,400 kW; 2,800–3,200 bhp) (diesels); 750 PS (550 kW; 740 shp) (electric)
- Propulsion: 2 shafts; 2 × diesel engines; 2 × electric motors
- Speed: 17.7 knots (32.8 km/h; 20.4 mph) surfaced; 7.6 knots (14.1 km/h; 8.7 mph) submerged
- Range: 8,500 nmi (15,700 km; 9,800 mi) at 10 knots (19 km/h; 12 mph) surfaced; 80 nmi (150 km; 92 mi) at 4 knots (7.4 km/h; 4.6 mph) submerged
- Test depth: 230 m (750 ft); Crush depth: 250–295 m (820–968 ft)
- Complement: 4 officers, 40–56 enlisted
- Armament: 5 × 53.3 cm (21 in) torpedo tubes (four bow, one stern); 14 × torpedoes; 1 × 8.8 cm (3.46 in) deck gun (220 rounds); 1 x 2 cm (0.79 in) C/30 AA gun

Service record
- Part of: 5th U-boat Flotilla; 28 January – 31 August 1942; 9th U-boat Flotilla; 1 September 1942 – 26 February 1944
- Identification codes: M 08 626
- Commanders: Oblt.z.S. / Kptlt. Heinz Walkerling; 28 January 1942 – 19 April 1943; Oblt.z.S. / Kptlt. Heinz Hungerhausen; 20 April 1943 – 26 February 1944
- Operations: 6 patrols: 1st patrol: 15 August – 6 October 1942; 2nd patrol: 1 November – 26 December 1942; 3rd patrol: 11 February – 29 March 1943; 4th patrol: 29 April – 7 June 1943; 5th patrol: 21 September – 22 November 1943; 6th patrol: 25 January – 26 February 1944
- Victories: 4 merchant ships sunk (26,194 GRT); 1 warship sunk (1,375 tons)

German submarine U-91 was a Type VIIC U-boat of Nazi Germany's Kriegsmarine during World War II.

She was laid down at the Flender Werke in Lübeck as yard number 295, launched on 30 November 1941 and commissioned on 28 January 1942 with Oberleutnant zur See Heinz Walkerling as commanding officer. Command was transferred to Oblt.z.S. Heinz Hungershausen on 20 April 1943.

She was a fairly successful boat, sinking over 26,000 tons of Allied shipping in a career lasting just 14 months and six patrols. She was a member of fifteen wolfpacks. After training with the 5th U-boat Flotilla, U-91 was assigned to the 9th flotilla on 1 September 1942 for operations.

== Design ==
German Type VIIC submarines were preceded by the shorter Type VIIB submarines. U-91 had a displacement of 769 tonnes (757 long tons) when at the surface and 871 tonnes (857 long tons) while submerged. She had a total length of 67.10 m (220 ft 2 in), a pressure hull length of 50.50 m (165 ft 8 in), a beam of 6.20 m (20 ft 4 in), a height of 9.60 m (31 ft 6 in), and a draught of 4.74 m (15 ft 7 in). The submarine was powered by two Germaniawerft F46 four-stroke, six-cylinder supercharged diesel engines producing a total of 2,800 to 3,200 metric horsepower (2,060 to 2,350 kW; 2,760 to 3,160 shp) for use while surfaced, two Brown, Boveri & Cie GG UB 720/8 double-acting electric motors producing a total of 750 metric horsepower (550 kW; 740 shp) for use while submerged. She had two shafts and two 1.23 m (4 ft) propellers. The boat was capable of operating at depths of up to 230 metres (750 ft).

The submarine had a maximum surface speed of 17.7 knots (32.8 km/h; 20.4 mph) and a maximum submerged speed of 7.6 knots (14.1 km/h; 8.7 mph). When submerged, the boat could operate for 80 nautical miles (150 km; 92 mi) at 4 knots (7.4 km/h; 4.6 mph); when surfaced, she could travel 8,500 nautical miles (15,700 km; 9,800 mi) at 10 knots (19 km/h; 12 mph). U-91 was fitted with five 53.3 cm (21 in) torpedo tubes (four fitted at the bow and one at the stern), fourteen torpedoes, one 8.8 cm (3.46 in) SK C/35 naval gun, 220 rounds, and a 2 cm (0.79 in) C/30 anti-aircraft gun. The boat had a complement of between forty-four and sixty.

== Service history ==
=== First patrol ===
U-91 departed Kiel for her first patrol on 15 August 1942. Having negotiated the Iceland/Faroes 'gap', she was attacked by a US PBY Catalina on 1 September. (This incident was originally thought to have been against U-756).

The escort vessels of convoy ON 127 fired on the boat on 12 September; minor damage was sustained.

U-91 sank the Canadian destroyer HMCS Ottawa on 14 September. The boat fired two torpedoes at 02:05 and confirmed a hit. At 02:15, the submarine came across the damaged Ottawa once again, but mistook her for a different vessel and fired a third torpedo, which destroyed the ship, killing 114 of the 181 men aboard.

She also sank New York southeast of Cape Farewell (Greenland) on 26 September.

She docked in Brest, on the French Atlantic coast, on 6 October.

=== Second patrol ===
The boat's second foray started from Brest on 1 November 1942 and finishing there on 26 December. It was relatively uneventful.

=== Third patrol ===
U-91 was subject to a "rain of aircraft bombs and depth charges from surface ships" which obliged her to break off an attack to carry out repairs on 21 February 1943.

The boat was soon back in action; on 17 March, U-91 attacked Convoy HX 229. Two American vessels - SS Harry Luckenbach and Irénée Du Pont - were destroyed along with the British merchant ship Nariva. The Luckenbach was hit by two torpedoes after five were fired between 03:37 and 03:41. Luckenbach sank in a mere three minutes, with seventy-one of the eighty men evacuating in lifeboats, although there were no reports of them being rescued. Nariva and Irénée Du Pont had been damaged by U-600 earlier that day. U-91 fired three torpedoes at 05:56: Two finishing off Du Pont, a third crippled Nariva.

The inbound submarine was attacked by a Leigh Light equipped Vickers Wellington of No. 172 Squadron RAF on the western edge of the Bay of Biscay on 27 March. Although not damaged, the boat dived with three men still top-side. Two were recovered, but the third could not be found.

U-91 returned to France, but to Lorient, on 29 March.

=== Fourth patrol ===
Sortie number four began from Lorient on 29 April 1943; it was also relatively quiet but terminated in Brest on 7 June.

=== Fifth patrol ===
U-91 was attacked by a B-24 Liberator of No. 10 Squadron RCAF on 26 October 1943. The undamaged U-boat had been searching for U-584 to supply her with fuel. The Liberator's assault was thought to have sunk U-420. A few days later, (on the 31st), having found U-584, she commenced the re-fuelling operation, but the two boats were spotted by aircraft from the escort carrier USS Card. In the ensuing mayhem, U-91 escaped without damage after diving; U-584 was not so lucky, she was sunk.

=== Sixth patrol and loss ===
U-91 departed Brest for the last time on 25 January 1944; on 26 February she was sunk in the middle of the North Atlantic by depth charges from the British frigates HMS Affleck, HMS Gore and HMS Gould.

36 men died with the U-boat including Kapitänleutnant Heinz Hungershausen; there were 16 survivors.

=== Patrols ===
#	Departure	Date	Arrival	Date	Length
1	Kiel	15 August 1942	Brest	6 October 1942	53 days
2	Brest	1 November 1942	Brest	26 December 1942	56 days
3	Brest	11 February 1943	Lorient	29 March 1943	47 days
4	Lorient	29 April 1943	Brest	7 June 1943	40 days
5	Brest	21 September 1943	Brest	22 November 1943	63 days
6	Brest	25 January 1944	Sunk	26 February 1944	33 days

=== Wolfpacks ===
U-91 took part in 15 wolfpacks, namely:

- Vorwärts (25 August - 26 September 1942)
- Natter (6 – 8 November 1942)
- Westwall (8 November - 12 December 1942)
- Knappen (19 – 25 February 1943)
- Burggraf (4 – 5 March 1943)
- Raubgraf (7 – 17 March 1943)
- Without name (5 – 10 May 1943)
- Lech (10 – 15 May 1943)
- Donau 2 (15 – 26 May 1943)
- Rossbach (6 – 9 October 1943)
- Schlieffen (14 – 22 October 1943)
- Siegfried (22 – 27 October 1943)
- Igel 2 (3 – 17 February 1944)
- Hai 1 (17 – 22 February 1944)
- Preussen (22 – 26 February 1944)

== Summary of raiding history ==
Date	Ship	Nationality	Tonnage (Note: Merchant ship tonnages are in gross register tons. Military vessels are listed by tons displacement.)	Fate
14 September 1942	HMCS Ottawa	Royal Canadian Navy	1,375	Sunk
26 September 1942	New York	United Kingdom	4,989	Sunk
17 March 1943	Harry Luckenbach	United States	6,366	Sunk
17 March 1943	Irénée Du Pont	United States	6,125	Sunk
17 March 1943	Nariva	United Kingdom	8,714	Sunk

== Bibliography ==
- Busch, Rainer; Röll, Hans-Joachim (1999). German U-boat commanders of World War II : a biographical dictionary. Translated by Brooks, Geoffrey. London, Annapolis, Md: Greenhill Books, Naval Institute Press. ISBN 1-55750-186-6.
- Busch, Rainer; Röll, Hans-Joachim (1999). Der U-Boot-Krieg, 1939-1945: Deutsche U-Boot-Verluste von September 1939 bis Mai 1945 [German U-boat losses from September 1939 to May 1945] (in German). Vol. IV. Hamburg, Berlin, Bonn: Mittler. ISBN 3-8132-0514-2.
- Edwards, Bernard (1996). Dönitz and the Wolf Packs - The U-boats at War. Cassell Military Classics. pp. 105, 110, 111. ISBN 0-304-35203-9.
- Gröner, Eric; Jung, Dieter; Maass, Martin (1991). German Warships 1815-1945: U-boats and Mine Warfare Vessels. Vol. 2. Translated by Thomas, Keith; Magowan, Rachel. London: Conway Maritime Press. ISBN 0-85177-593-4.
