= German submarine U-192 =

German World War II submarine

History

Nazi Germany
- Name: U-192
- Ordered: 4 November 1940
- Builder: DeSchiMAG AG Weser, Bremen
- Yard number: 1038
- Laid down: 27 November 1941
- Launched: 30 July 1942
- Commissioned: 16 November 1942
- Fate: Sunk, 6 May 1943

General characteristics
- Class & type: Type IXC/40 submarine
- Displacement: 1,120 t (1,100 long tons) surfaced; 1,232 t (1,213 long tons) submerged
- Length: 76.76 m (251.8 ft) o/a; 58.75 m (192 ft 9 in) pressure hull
- Beam: 6.90 m (22 ft 8 in) o/a; 4.40 m (14 ft 5 in) pressure hull
- Height: 9.60 m (31 ft 6 in)
- Draught: 4.70 m (15 ft 5 in)
- Installed power: 4,400 PS (3,200 kW; 4,300 bhp) (diesels); 1,000 PS (740 kW; 990 shp) (electric)
- Propulsion: 2 shafts; 2 × diesel engines; 2 × electric motors
- Speed: 18.3 knots (33.9 km/h; 21.1 mph) surfaced; 7.3 knots (13.5 km/h; 8.4 mph) submerged
- Range: 13,850 nmi (25,650 km; 15,940 mi) at 10 knots (19 km/h; 12 mph) surfaced; 117 nmi (217 km; 135 mi) at 4 knots (7.4 km/h; 4.6 mph) submerged
- Test depth: 230 m (750 ft)
- Complement: 4 officers, 44 enlisted
- Armament: 6 × torpedo tubes (4 bow, 2 stern); 22 × 53.3 cm (21 in) torpedoes; 1 × 10.5 cm (4.1 in) SK C/32 deck gun (180 rounds); 1 × 3.7 cm (1.5 in) SK C/30 AA gun; 1 × twin 2 cm FlaK 30 AA guns

Service record
- Part of: 4th U-boat Flotilla; 16 November 1942 – 30 April 1943; 10th U-boat Flotilla; 1 – 6 May 1943
- Identification codes: M 50 188
- Commanders: Oblt.z.S. Werner Happe; 16 November 1942 – 6 May 1943
- Operations: 1 patrol: 13 April – 6 May 1943
- Victories: None

German submarine U-192 was a very short-lived Type IXC/40 U-boat of Nazi Germany's Kriegsmarine built during World War II for service in the Battle of the Atlantic. During her maiden voyage in May 1943, she was sunk by a British warship, HMS Loosestrife on 6 May 1943.

== Design ==
German Type IXC/40 submarines were slightly larger than the original Type IXCs. U-192 had a displacement of 1,144 tonnes (1,126 long tons) when at the surface and 1,257 tonnes (1,237 long tons) while submerged. The U-boat had a total length of 76.76 m (251 ft 10 in), a pressure hull length of 58.75 m (192 ft 9 in), a beam of 6.86 m (22 ft 6 in), a height of 9.60 m (31 ft 6 in), and a draught of 4.67 m (15 ft 4 in). The submarine was powered by two MAN M 9 V 40/46 supercharged four-stroke, nine-cylinder diesel engines producing a total of 4,400 metric horsepower (3,240 kW; 4,340 shp) for use while surfaced, two Siemens-Schuckert 2 GU 345/34 double-acting electric motors producing a total of 1,000 shaft horsepower (1,010 PS; 750 kW) for use while submerged. She had two shafts and two 1.92 m (6 ft) propellers. The boat was capable of operating at depths of up to 230 metres (750 ft).

The submarine had a maximum surface speed of 18.3 knots (33.9 km/h; 21.1 mph) and a maximum submerged speed of 7.3 knots (13.5 km/h; 8.4 mph). When submerged, the boat could operate for 63 nautical miles (117 km; 72 mi) at 4 knots (7.4 km/h; 4.6 mph); when surfaced, she could travel 13,850 nautical miles (25,650 km; 15,940 mi) at 10 knots (19 km/h; 12 mph). U-192 was fitted with six 53.3 cm (21 in) torpedo tubes (four fitted at the bow and two at the stern), 22 torpedoes, one 10.5 cm (4.13 in) SK C/32 naval gun, 180 rounds, and a 3.7 cm (1.5 in) SK C/30 as well as a 2 cm (0.79 in) C/30 anti-aircraft gun. The boat had a complement of forty-eight.

== Service history ==
She was built in Bremen during 1942 and was ready to sail in April 1943, following four months of training and working-up trials in the Baltic Sea, under the command of Oberleutnant zur See Werner Happe (Crew 36).

U-192 left Kiel for operations in the West Atlantic on 13 April 1943. The U-boat participated in three wolfpacks, Meise, Star, and Fink at the end of April 1943. Two attacks on Allied shipping had failed, when U-192 was picked up by an escort of convoy ONS 5, HMS Loosestrife, early on 6 May 1943. The escort sank the U-boat with depth charges at 53°6′N 45°44′W, killing its entire crew of 55.

=== Wolfpacks ===
U-192 took part in three wolfpacks, namely:

- Meise (25 – 27 April 1943)
- Star (27 April - 4 May 1943)
- Fink (4 – 6 May 1943)

== Bibliography ==
- Busch, Rainer; Röll, Hans-Joachim (1999). German U-boat commanders of World War II : a biographical dictionary. Translated by Brooks, Geoffrey. London, Annapolis, Md: Greenhill Books, Naval Institute Press. ISBN 1-55750-186-6.
- Busch, Rainer; Röll, Hans-Joachim (1999). Deutsche U-Boot-Verluste von September 1939 bis Mai 1945 [German U-boat losses from September 1939 to May 1945]. Der U-Boot-Krieg (in German). Vol. IV. Hamburg, Berlin, Bonn: Mittler. ISBN 3-8132-0514-2.
- Edwards, Bernard (1996). Dönitz and the Wolfpacks - The U-boats at War. Cassell Military Classics. pp. 195, 199. ISBN 0-304-35203-9.
- Gröner, Erich; Jung, Dieter; Maass, Martin (1991). U-boats and Mine Warfare Vessels. German Warships 1815–1945. Vol. 2. Translated by Thomas, Keith; Magowan, Rachel. London: Conway Maritime Press. ISBN 0-85177-593-4.
- Sharpe, Peter (1998). U-Boat Fact File. Great Britain: Midland Publishing. ISBN 1-85780-072-9.
