= HMS Gould =

Frigate of the Royal Navy

History

United States
- Name: USS Lovering
- Namesake: William Bacon Lovering (1913-1942)
- Builder: Boston Navy Yard, Boston, Massachusetts
- Laid down: 23 April 1943
- Launched: 4 June 1943
- Completed: 18 September 1943
- Identification: Hull number: DE-272
- Fate: Transferred to United Kingdom 18 September 1943

United Kingdom
- Name: HMS Gould
- Namesake: Admiral Sir Davidge Gould (1758-1847), British naval officer who was commanding officer of HMS Audacious at the Battle of the Nile in 1798
- Acquired: 18 September 1943
- Commissioned: 18 September 1943
- Identification: Pennant number: K476
- Fate: Sunk, 1 March 1944

General characteristics
- Class & type: Captain-class frigate
- Displacement: 1,140 long tons (1,158 t)
- Length: 289.5 ft (88.2 m)
- Beam: 35 ft (11 m)
- Draught: 9 ft (2.7 m)
- Propulsion: Four General Motors 278A 16-cylinder engines; GE 7,040 bhp (5,250 kW) generators (4,800 kW); GE electric motors for 6,000 shp (4,500 kW); Two shafts
- Speed: 20 knots (37 km/h)
- Range: 5,000 nautical miles (9,260 km) at 15 knots (28 km/h)
- Complement: 156
- Sensors & processing systems: SA & SL type radars; Type 144 series Asdic; MF Direction Finding antenna; HF Direction Finding Type FH 4 antenna
- Armament: 3 × 3 in (76 mm) /50 Mk.22 guns; 1 × twin Bofors 40 mm mount Mk.I; 7–16 × 20 mm Oerlikon guns; Mark 10 Hedgehog antisubmarine mortar; Depth charges; QF 2-pounder naval gun
- Notes: Pennant number K476

HMS Gould (K476) was a British Captain-class frigate of the Royal Navy in commission during World War II. Originally constructed as the United States Navy Evarts-class destroyer escort USS Lovering (DE-272), she served in the Royal Navy from 1943 until her sinking in 1944.

== Construction and transfer ==
The ship was ordered on 25 January 1942 and laid down as the destroyer escort USS Lovering (DE-272), the first ship of the name, by the Boston Navy Yard in Boston, Massachusetts, on 20 May 1943. She was launched on 8 July 1943, sponsored by Mrs. Joseph S. Lovering, sister-in-law of the ship's namesake, the late Ensign William B. Lovering. The United States transferred the ship upon completion to the United Kingdom under Lend-Lease on 18 September 1943.

== Service history ==
The ship was commissioned into service in the Royal Navy as the frigate HMS Gould (K476) on 18 September 1943 simultaneously with her transfer. She served on convoy escort duty in the North Atlantic Ocean.

On 26 February 1944, Gould joined the British frigates HMS Affleck and HMS Gore in a depth-charge attack that sank the German submarine U-91 in the North Atlantic at position 49°45′N 26°20′W.

On 29 February 1944, Gould was operating as part of the First Escort Group when she, Affleck, Gore, and the British frigate HMS Garlies detected the German submarine U-358 in the North Atlantic north-northeast of the Azores and began a depth-charge attack which continued through the night and into 1 March 1944, the four frigates dropping a combined 104 depth charges. Gore and Garlies were forced to withdraw to Gibraltar to refuel on 1 March, but Affleck and Gould continued to attack U-358. During the afternoon of 1 March, U-358 succeeded in torpedoing and sinking Gould with a G7es – known to the Allies as "GNAT" – torpedo at position 45°46′N 23°16′W. Ungoed, six other officers, and 116 ratings died in the sinking, and only 14 of Gould's crew survived. U-358 was soon forced to surface after 38 hours submerged and was sunk by gunfire from Affleck at position 45°46′N 23°16′W.
