= German submarine U-392 =

German world war II submarine

Coordinates: 35.9167°N 5.6833°W

History

Nazi Germany
- Name: U-392
- Ordered: 20 January 1941
- Builder: Howaldtswerke, Kiel
- Yard number: 24
- Laid down: 10 January 1942
- Launched: 10 April 1943
- Commissioned: 29 May 1943
- Fate: Sunk, 16 March 1944

General characteristics
- Class & type: Type VIIC submarine
- Displacement: 769 tonnes (757 long tons) surfaced; 871 t (857 long tons) submerged
- Length: 67.10 m (220 ft 2 in) o/a; 50.50 m (165 ft 8 in) pressure hull
- Beam: 6.20 m (20 ft 4 in) o/a; 4.70 m (15 ft 5 in) pressure hull
- Height: 9.60 m (31 ft 6 in)
- Draught: 4.74 m (15 ft 7 in)
- Installed power: 2,800–3,200 PS (2,100–2,400 kW; 2,800–3,200 bhp) (diesels); 750 PS (550 kW; 740 shp) (electric)
- Propulsion: 2 shafts; 2 × diesel engines; 2 × electric motors
- Speed: 17.7 knots (32.8 km/h; 20.4 mph) surfaced; 7.6 knots (14.1 km/h; 8.7 mph) submerged
- Range: 8,500 nmi (15,700 km; 9,800 mi) at 10 knots (19 km/h; 12 mph) surfaced; 80 nmi (150 km; 92 mi) at 4 knots (7.4 km/h; 4.6 mph) submerged
- Test depth: 230 m (750 ft); Crush depth: 250–295 m (820–968 ft)
- Complement: 4 officers, 40–56 enlisted
- Armament: 5 × 53.3 cm (21 in) torpedo tubes (four bow, one stern); 14 × torpedoes; 1 × 8.8 cm (3.46 in) deck gun (220 rounds); 2 × twin 2 cm (0.79 in) C/30 anti-aircraft guns

Service record
- Part of: 5th U-boat Flotilla; 29 May – 30 November 1943; 1st U-boat Flotilla; 1 December 1943 – 16 March 1944
- Identification codes: M 45 441
- Commanders: Oblt.z.S. Henning Schümann; 29 May 1943 – 16 March 1944
- Operations: 2 patrols: 1st patrol: 2 December 1943 – 20 January 1944; 2nd patrol: 29 February – 16 March 1944
- Victories: None

German submarine U-392 was a Type VIIC U-boat of Nazi Germany's Kriegsmarine during World War II. She carried out two patrols. She did not sink or damage any ships. She was sunk by US aircraft and British warships in the Strait of Gibraltar on 16 March 1944.

== Design ==
German Type VIIC submarines were preceded by the shorter Type VIIB submarines. U-392 had a displacement of 769 tonnes (757 long tons) when at the surface and 871 tonnes (857 long tons) while submerged. She had a total length of 67.10 m (220 ft 2 in), a pressure hull length of 50.50 m (165 ft 8 in), a beam of 6.20 m (20 ft 4 in), a height of 9.60 m (31 ft 6 in), and a draught of 4.74 m (15 ft 7 in). The submarine was powered by two Germaniawerft F46 four-stroke, six-cylinder supercharged diesel engines producing a total of 2,800 to 3,200 metric horsepower (2,060 to 2,350 kW; 2,760 to 3,160 shp) for use while surfaced, two Garbe, Lahmeyer & Co. RP 137/c double-acting electric motors producing a total of 750 metric horsepower (550 kW; 740 shp) for use while submerged. She had two shafts and two 1.23 m (4 ft) propellers. The boat was capable of operating at depths of up to 230 metres (750 ft).

The submarine had a maximum surface speed of 17.7 knots (32.8 km/h; 20.4 mph) and a maximum submerged speed of 7.6 knots (14.1 km/h; 8.7 mph). When submerged, the boat could operate for 80 nautical miles (150 km; 92 mi) at 4 knots (7.4 km/h; 4.6 mph); when surfaced, she could travel 8,500 nautical miles (15,700 km; 9,800 mi) at 10 knots (19 km/h; 12 mph). U-392 was fitted with five 53.3 cm (21 in) torpedo tubes (four fitted at the bow and one at the stern), fourteen torpedoes, one 8.8 cm (3.46 in) SK C/35 naval gun, 220 rounds, and two twin 2 cm (0.79 in) C/30 anti-aircraft guns. The boat had a complement of between forty-four and sixty.

== Service history ==
The submarine was laid down on 10 January 1942 at the Howaldtswerke (yard) at Flensburg as yard number 24, launched on 10 April 1943 and commissioned on 29 May under the command of Oberleutnant zur See Henning Schümann.

The boat was a member of five wolfpacks.

She served with the 5th U-boat Flotilla from 29 May 1943 and the 1st flotilla from 1 December of the same year.

=== First patrol ===
The boat departed Kiel on 2 December 1943. She passed through the gap that separates Iceland and the Faroe Islands, turned about and headed northeast of Iceland; she then turned about once more and made for the northern Atlantic Ocean. She docked in Brest in occupied France on 20 January 1944.

=== Second patrol and loss ===
U-392 had departed Brest on 29 February 1944, heading south. On 16 March, she was attacked and sunk by depth charges from three US PBY Catalinas, the British frigate HMS Affleck and the British destroyer HMS Vanoc in the Strait of Gibraltar.

52 men died in the U-boat; there were no survivors.

=== Wolfpacks ===
U-392 took part in five wolfpacks, namely:

- Coronel 1 (15 – 17 December 1943)
- Amrum (18 – 23 December 1943)
- Rügen 4 (23 December 1943 – 2 January 1944)
- Rügen 3 (2 – 7 January 1944)
- Rügen (7 – 11 January 1944)

== Bibliography ==
- Busch, Rainer; Röll, Hans-Joachim (1999). German U-boat commanders of World War II : a biographical dictionary. Translated by Brooks, Geoffrey. London, Annapolis, Md: Greenhill Books, Naval Institute Press. ISBN 1-55750-186-6.
- Busch, Rainer; Röll, Hans-Joachim (1999). Deutsche U-Boot-Verluste von September 1939 bis Mai 1945 [German U-boat losses from September 1939 to May 1945]. Der U-Boot-Krieg (in German). Vol. IV. Hamburg, Berlin, Bonn: Mittler. ISBN 3-8132-0514-2.
- Gröner, Erich; Jung, Dieter; Maass, Martin (1991). U-boats and Mine Warfare Vessels. German Warships 1815–1945. Vol. 2. Translated by Thomas, Keith; Magowan, Rachel. London: Conway Maritime Press. ISBN 0-85177-593-4.
- Kemp, Paul (1999). U-Boats Destroyed - German Submarine Losses in the World Wars. London: Arms & Armour. ISBN 1-85409-515-3.
