= HMS Garlies =

Frigate of the Royal Navy

History

United States
- Name: USS Fleming (DE-271)
- Namesake: United States Marine Corps Captain Richard Eugene Fleming (1917-1942), killed in action during the Battle of Midway in June 1942
- Ordered: 25 January 1942
- Builder: Boston Navy Yard, Boston, Massachusetts
- Laid down: 7 April 1943
- Launched: 19 May 1943
- Fate: Transferred to United Kingdom 13 June or 13 July 1943
- Acquired: Returned by United Kingdom 20 August 1945
- Name: USS Garlies (DE-271)
- Namesake: British name retained
- Commissioned: 20 August 1945
- Decommissioned: 10 October 1945
- Stricken: 1 November 1945
- Fate: Sold 18 July 1947 for scrapping

United Kingdom
- Name: HMS Garlies (K475)
- Namesake: Admiral George Stewart, Lord Garlies (1768-1834), British naval officer who was commanding officer of HMS Lively at the Battle of Cape St. Vincent in 1797 and of HMS Bellerophon at the blockade of Brest, France, in 1801
- Christened: 13 September 1943
- Completed: 13 September 1943
- Acquired: 13 June or 13 July 1943
- Commissioned: 13 September 1943
- Fate: Returned to United States 20 August 1945

General characteristics
- Displacement: 1,140 long tons (1,158 t)
- Length: 289.5 ft (88.2 m)
- Beam: 35 ft (11 m)
- Draught: 9 ft (2.7 m)
- Propulsion: Four General Motors 278A 16-cylinder engines; GE 7,040 bhp (5,250 kW) generators (4,800 kW); GE electric motors for 6,000 shp (4,500 kW); Two shafts
- Speed: 20 knots (37 km/h)
- Range: 5,000 nautical miles (9,260 km) at 15 knots (28 km/h)
- Complement: 156
- Sensors & processing systems: SA & SL type radars; Type 144 series Asdic; MF Direction Finding antenna; HF Direction Finding Type FH 4 antenna
- Armament: 3 × 3 in (76 mm) /50 Mk.22 guns; 1 × twin Bofors 40 mm mount Mk.I; 7–16 × 20 mm Oerlikon guns; Mark 10 Hedgehog antisubmarine mortar; depth charges; QF 2-pounder naval gun
- Notes: Pennant number K475

HMS Garlies (K475) was a British Captain-class frigate of the Royal Navy in commission during World War II. Originally constructed as the United States Navy Evarts-class destroyer escort USS Fleming (DE-271), she served in the Royal Navy from 1943 to 1945 and in the U.S. Navy as USS Garlies (DE-271) from August to October 1945.

== Construction and transfer ==
The ship was ordered as the U.S. Navy destroyer escort DE-271 on 25 January 1942 and assigned the name USS Fleming, the first ship of the name, on 23 February 1943. She was laid down by the Boston Navy Yard in Boston, Massachusetts, on 7 April 1943 and launched on 19 May 1943, sponsored by Mrs. Michael E. Fleming. The United States transferred the ship to the United Kingdom under Lend-Lease on 13 June or 13 July 1943 (sources vary) while she was still under construction.

== Service history ==
=== Royal Navy, 1943-1945 ===
Christened on 13 September 1943, sponsored by Mrs. Frances Brown, the wife of J. Andrew Brown, the ship was commissioned the same day into service in the Royal Navy as HMS Garlies, named for Lord Garlies, commanding officer of the frigate Lively at the 1797 Battle of Cape St. Vincent in the Napoleonic Wars, with the pennant number K475. She served on patrol and escort duty in the North Atlantic Ocean.

On 29 February 1944, Garlies was operating as part of the First Escort Group when she and the British frigates Affleck, Gould, and Gore detected the German submarine U-358 in the North Atlantic north-northeast of the Azores and began a depth-charge attack which continued through the night and into 1 March 1944, the four frigates dropping a combined 104 depth charges. Garlies and Gore were forced to withdraw to Gibraltar to refuel on 1 March, but Affleck and Gould continued to attack U-358. During the afternoon of 1 March, U-358 succeeded in torpedoing and sinking Gould at position 45°46′00″N 023°16′00″W, but then was forced to surface after 38 hours submerged and was sunk by gunfire from Affleck at position 45°46′00″N 023°16′00″W.

Garlies supported the invasion of Normandy in the summer of 1944.

The Royal Navy returned Garlies to the U.S. Navy at Chatham Dockyard, England, on 20 August 1945.

=== U.S. Navy, 1945 ===
The ship was commissioned into the U.S. Navy as USS Garlies (DE-271) on 20 August 1945 simultaneously with her return. She departed Chatham on 30 August 1945 bound for the United States, and arrived at the Philadelphia Naval Shipyard in Philadelphia, Pennsylvania, on 8 September 1945. She remained there until decommissioned on 10 October 1945.

== Disposal ==
The U.S. Navy struck Garlies from its Naval Vessel Register on 1 November 1945. She was sold to Thomas H. Barker on 19 July 1947 for scrapping.
