= German submarine U-358 =

German World War II submarine

History

Nazi Germany
- Name: U-358
- Ordered: 26 October 1939
- Builder: Flensburger Schiffbau-Gesellschaft, Flensburg
- Yard number: 477
- Laid down: 25 June 1940
- Launched: 30 April 1942
- Commissioned: 15 August 1942
- Fate: Sunk on 1 March 1944 by British warships north of the Azores

General characteristics
- Class & type: Type VIIC submarine
- Displacement: 769 tonnes (757 long tons) surfaced; 871 t (857 long tons) submerged
- Length: 67.10 m (220 ft 2 in) o/a; 50.50 m (165 ft 8 in) pressure hull
- Beam: 6.20 m (20 ft 4 in) o/a; 4.70 m (15 ft 5 in) pressure hull
- Height: 9.60 m (31 ft 6 in)
- Draught: 4.74 m (15 ft 7 in)
- Installed power: 2,800–3,200 PS (2,100–2,400 kW; 2,800–3,200 bhp) (diesels); 750 PS (550 kW; 740 shp) (electric)
- Propulsion: 2 shafts; 2 × diesel engines; 2 × electric motors
- Speed: 17.7 knots (32.8 km/h; 20.4 mph) surfaced; 7.6 knots (14.1 km/h; 8.7 mph) submerged
- Range: 8,500 nmi (15,700 km; 9,800 mi) at 10 knots (19 km/h; 12 mph) surfaced; 80 nmi (150 km; 92 mi) at 4 knots (7.4 km/h; 4.6 mph) submerged
- Test depth: 230 m (750 ft); Crush depth: 250–295 m (820–968 ft)
- Complement: 4 officers, 40–56 enlisted
- Armament: 5 × 53.3 cm (21 in) torpedo tubes (four bow, one stern); 14 × torpedoes or 26 TMA mines; 1 × 8.8 cm (3.46 in) deck gun (220 rounds); 2 × twin 2 cm (0.79 in) C/30 anti-aircraft guns

Service record
- Part of: 8th U-boat Flotilla; 15 August 1942 – 31 January 1943; 7th U-boat Flotilla; 1 February 1943 – 1 March 1944
- Identification codes: M 50 646
- Commanders: Oblt.z.S. / Kptlt. Rolf Manke; 15 August 1942 – 1 March 1944
- Operations: 5 patrols: 1st patrol: a. 12 – 14 January 1943; b. 16 January – 8 March 1943; 2nd patrol: 11 April – 15 May 1943; 3rd patrol: 10 June – 1 September 1943; 4th patrol: 23 October – 16 December 1943; 5th patrol: 14 February – 1 March 1944
- Victories: 4 merchant ships sunk (17,753 GRT); 1 warship sunk (1,192 tons)

German submarine U-358 was a Type VIIC U-boat of Nazi Germany's Kriegsmarine during World War II.

She carried out five patrols before being sunk north of the Azores by British warships on 1 March 1944.

She sank four ships and one warship.

== Design ==
German Type VIIC submarines were preceded by the shorter Type VIIB submarines. U-358 had a displacement of 769 tonnes (757 long tons) when at the surface and 871 tonnes (857 long tons) while submerged. She had a total length of 67.10 m (220 ft 2 in), a pressure hull length of 50.50 m (165 ft 8 in), a beam of 6.20 m (20 ft 4 in), a height of 9.60 m (31 ft 6 in), and a draught of 4.74 m (15 ft 7 in). The submarine was powered by two Germaniawerft F46 four-stroke, six-cylinder supercharged diesel engines producing a total of 2,800 to 3,200 metric horsepower (2,060 to 2,350 kW; 2,760 to 3,160 shp) for use while surfaced, two AEG GU 460/8–27 double-acting electric motors producing a total of 750 metric horsepower (550 kW; 740 shp) for use while submerged. She had two shafts and two 1.23 m (4 ft) propellers. The boat was capable of operating at depths of up to 230 metres (750 ft).

The submarine had a maximum surface speed of 17.7 knots (32.8 km/h; 20.4 mph) and a maximum submerged speed of 7.6 knots (14.1 km/h; 8.7 mph). When submerged, the boat could operate for 80 nautical miles (150 km; 92 mi) at 4 knots (7.4 km/h; 4.6 mph); when surfaced, she could travel 8,500 nautical miles (15,700 km; 9,800 mi) at 10 knots (19 km/h; 12 mph). U-358 was fitted with five 53.3 cm (21 in) torpedo tubes (four fitted at the bow and one at the stern), fourteen torpedoes, one 8.8 cm (3.46 in) SK C/35 naval gun, 220 rounds, and two twin 2 cm (0.79 in) C/30 anti-aircraft guns. The boat had a complement of between forty-four and sixty.

== Service history ==
The submarine was laid down on 25 June 1940 at the Flensburger Schiffbau-Gesellschaft yard at Flensburg as yard number 477, launched on 30 April 1942 and commissioned on 15 August under the command of Oberleutnant zur See Rolf Manke.

=== First patrol ===
The boat's first patrol was in two parts; it began with her departure from Kiel on 12 January 1943. During the second part, which began with her departure from Kristiansand in Norway on the 16th, she negotiated the gap between Iceland and the Faroe Islands and sank the Neva 200 nautical miles (370 km; 230 mi) west of these islands on the 22nd. On the 26th, she sank the Nortind east of Cape Farewell (Greenland). She arrived at St. Nazaire in occupied France on 8 March.

=== Second patrol ===
Having left St. Nazaire (which became her base for the rest of her career) on 11 April 1943, U-358 sank Bristol City and Wentworth. She was attacked south of Cape Farewell by the British corvette HMS Pink commanded by Lieutenant Robert Atkinson and badly damaged. (This attack had originally credited Pink with the destruction of U-192.)

=== Third patrol ===
The submarine's third foray took her south, as far as the Gulf of Guinea, off the west African coast. At 84 days, it was her longest patrol.

=== Fourth patrol ===
U-358's fourth patrol was northeast of the Azores.

=== Fifth patrol and loss ===
U-358 left St. Nazaire on 14 February 1944. From the 29th, she was hunted by the British frigates HMS Gould, Affleck, Gore and Garlies north of the Azores. Gore and Garlies had to break off the assault and sail to Gibraltar to re-fuel. The U-boat sank Gould on 1 March, but Affleck persisted with the attack, sinking U-358 with gunfire after the submarine was forced to the surface.

50 men died in the U-boat; there was one survivor, Alfons Eckert.

=== Wolfpacks ===
U-358 took part in eleven wolfpacks, namely:

- Haudegen (27 January – 2 February 1943)
- Nordsturm (2 – 9 February 1943)
- Haudegen (9 – 15 February 1943)
- Taifun (15 – 20 February 1943)
- Without name (15 – 18 April 1943)
- Specht (19 April – 4 May 1943)
- Fink (4 – 6 May 1943)
- Schill (2 – 16 November 1943)
- Schill 1 (16 – 22 November 1943)
- Weddigen (22 November – 7 December 1943)
- Preussen (22 February – 1 March 1944)

== Summary of raiding history ==
Date	Ship Name	Nationality	Tonnage (Note: Merchant ship tonnages are in gross register tons. Naval vessels are listed by tons displacement.)	Fate
22 January 1943	Neva	Sweden	1,456	Sunk
26 January 1943	Nortind	Norway	8,221	Sunk
5 May 1943	Bristol City	United Kingdom	2,864	Sunk
5 May 1943	Wentworth	United Kingdom	5,212	Sunk
1 March 1944	HMS Gould	Royal Navy	1,192	Sunk

== Bibliography ==
- Busch, Rainer; Röll, Hans-Joachim (1999). German U-boat commanders of World War II : a biographical dictionary. Translated by Brooks, Geoffrey. London, Annapolis, Md: Greenhill Books, Naval Institute Press. ISBN 1-55750-186-6.
- Busch, Rainer; Röll, Hans-Joachim (1999). Der U-Boot-Krieg, 1939-1945: Deutsche U-Boot-Verluste von September 1939 bis Mai 1945 [German U-boat losses from September 1939 to May 1945] (in German). Vol. IV. Hamburg, Berlin, Bonn: Mittler. ISBN 3-8132-0514-2.
- Edwards, Bernard (1996). Dönitz and the Wolf Packs – The U-boats at War. Cassell Military Classics. p. 198. ISBN 0-304-35203-9.
- Gröner, Erich; Jung, Dieter; Maass, Martin (1991). U-boats and Mine Warfare Vessels. German Warships 1815–1945. Vol. 2. Translated by Thomas, Keith; Magowan, Rachel. London: Conway Maritime Press. ISBN 0-85177-593-4.
- Kemp, Paul (1999). U-Boats Destroyed – German Submarine Losses in the World Wars. London: Arms & Armour. ISBN 1-85409-515-3.
