= Rolf Manke =

German submarine commander

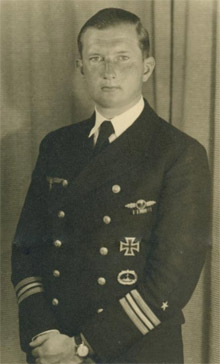
- Born: December 15, 1915; Lichterfelde
- Died: March 1, 1944 (aged 28); North Atlantic
- Military career
- Branch: Kriegsmarine
- Service years: 1935–1944
- Rank: Kapitänleutnant
- Commands: U-358
- Awards: German Cross in Gold

Rolf Manke (21 December 1915 – 1 March 1944) was the commander of German submarine U-358 which was responsible for the sinking of four Allied ships and one neutral ship.

== Early life ==
Rolf Manke was born on 21 December 1915.

== Career ==
Manke entered the Kriegsmarine in 1935 and was commissioned as Leutnant zur See in 1938. From September 1938 until August 1941 he served with the Luftwaffe. He was in charge of training on U-575 before becoming commander of U-358. In 1943–44, Manke made five patrols in U-358 from his base in St. Nazaire, during which he sank three Allied ships and one neutral ship (and fatally damaged another allied ship so that she had to be scuttled) with a total of 18,945 GRT. According to a sailor who served on U-358, Manke was disliked by the crew as they thought him overly strict. The last patrol of U-358 sailed from St. Nazaire on 14 February 1944. According to the same sailor, the boat came under sustained attack from depth charges on 29 February/1 March and was eventually forced to surface due to foul air, but submerged again when it came under further attack.

Manke was awarded the Iron Cross 1st and 2nd class, the U-boat Front Clasp, the U-boat War Badge and the German Cross in Gold.

== Death ==
Manke died on 1 March 1944 in the sinking of U-358.

== Bibliography ==
- Busch, Rainer; Röll, Hans-Joachim (1996). Die Deutschen U-Boot-Kommandanten [The German U-Boat Commanders] (in German). Vol. I. Hamburg, Berlin, Bonn, Germany: E.S. Mittler & Sohn. p. 153. ISBN 978-3-8132-0490-2.
