= Dart =

Dart or DART may refer to:

== Arts, entertainment and media ==
- Dart (missile), a thrown weapon, also used in the game of darts
- Dart, a character from G.I. Joe
- Dart, a Thomas & Friends railway engine character
- Dart Feld, protagonist in the video game The Legend of Dragoon
- Dart (poetry collection), a 2002 collection by British poet Alice Oswald
- Dart (sewing), a fold sewn into the fabric of a garment

== Businesses and organizations ==
- Dart (commercial vehicle), a former manufacturer of commercial vehicles in Iowa
- Dart Container, a US cup and container manufacturer
- Dart Container Line, a shipping consortium that operated from 1969 to 1981
- Dart Drug, a former US drug-store chain
- Dart Group, a British airline and industrial holding company
- Dart Industries, a US drug-store group founded by Justin Whitlock Dart
- Dart Music, a digital music aggregator based in Tennessee
- Dart National Bank, a private bank in Michigan
- Direct Action and Research Training Center, a community organizing network in several states of the US
- Disaster Assistance and Rescue Team, a Singapore Civil Defence Force team
- Disaster Assistance Response Team, a Canadian Forces team

== Places ==
- Cape Dart, a cape on Siple Island, Marie Byrd Land
- Dart Island, an island off the coast of Tasmania
- Dart River (disambiguation)
- Dart, Ohio, an unincorporated community

== Science and technology ==
=== Biology ===
- Love dart, an object created by hermaphroditic snails and slugs during courtship
- Dart, some moth species in the family Noctuidae
- Potanthus, a genus of skipper butterflies commonly known as darts

=== Computing ===
- Dart (programming language), a client-focused programming language from Google targeting multiple platforms
- DART (disk utility), a legacy Macintosh program for disk duplication and archival
- Microsoft Diagnostics and Recovery Toolset (DaRT), a suite of diagnosis and recovery software
- Dynamic Analysis and Replanning Tool (DART), a U.S. military artificial intelligence program
- DART for Publishers, now Google Ad Manager

=== Mathematics ===
- Dart, a concave kite in geometry

=== Space ===
- DART (satellite), a former NASA spacecraft launched 2005
- Double Asteroid Redirection Test, a NASA planetary defense mission that intentionally impacted a space probe onto an asteroid in 2022

=== Technology ===
- DART radiative transfer model, a 3D radiative transfer model used in remote sensing
- Deep-ocean Assessment and Reporting of Tsunamis, a component of an enhanced tsunami warning system
- Direct analysis in real time (DART), an ion source used in mass spectrometry
- Diversity arrays technology (DArT), a technology used in molecular genetics

== Transport ==
- Dart (ship), a list of ships with the name Dart
- Dart, an 1863 South Devon Railway Eagle class locomotive
- Dart charge, the charging system for the Dartford Crossing of the River Thames near London

=== Aircraft ===
- Convair F-106 Delta Dart, American interceptor fighter jet
- Dart (rocketry), a free-flying top of a sounding rocket
- Dart Aircraft, a 1930s British aircraft manufacturer
- Culver Dart, a 1930s American light aircraft
- Blackburn Dart, a 1920s British biplane
- Paraavis Dart, a Russian paraglider
- Rolls-Royce Dart, a turboprop engine

=== Missiles and weapons ===
- Dart (missile), a projectile weapon with pointed tip
- SSM-A-23 Dart, a 1950s American anti-tank missile
- Sea Dart, a modern British surface-to-air missile
- Paper dart, another name for a paper plane
- Dart gun (disambiguation)

=== Public transport ===
- Bucks County Transport DART, a bus transit system in Bucks County, Pennsylvania, US
- Dallas Area Rapid Transit, a Texas transit agency
- Dar Rapid Transit Agency, a bus rapid transit system in Dar es Salaam, Tanzania
- DART First State, a transit system in Delaware, US
- Des Moines Area Regional Transit, Iowa, US
- Dial-a-Ride Transit, a form of public transport in the UK
- Dixie Area Rapid Transit, the former name of SunTran in Utah, US
- Doncaster Area Rapid Transit, a section of SmartBus routes in Melbourne, Australia
- Dublin Area Rapid Transit, a railway network in Ireland
- Luton DART, a rail shuttle serving Luton Airport, United Kingdom

=== Road vehicles ===
- Daimler Dart, a British sports car produced 1959–1964
- Dennis Dart, a bus chassis model
- Dodge Dart, an American car produced 1960–1976
- Dodge Dart (PF), an American car produced 2013–2016
- Goggomobil Dart, an Australian microcar produced 1959–1961
- GSM Dart, a South African sports car

== Other ==
- Dart (surname) (people named Dart)

== See also ==
- Darts (disambiguation)
