= Dart (surname) =

Dart is a surname. Notable people with the surname include:

- Doc Corbin Dart (born 1953), American punk rock singer
- G. F. J. Dart (1905–1978), New Zealand educational reformer and scholar
- Harriet Dart (born 1996), British professional tennis player
- Harry Grant Dart (1869–1938), American cartoonist and illustrator
- Jaxson Dart (born 2003), American football player
- Joe Dart (born 1991), bassist of funk band Vulfpeck
- John Dart (1837–1910), Canadian Anglican bishop
- John Dart (died 1730), English lawyer and clergyman
- John Raynor Dart (1855–1935), New Zealand Anglican priest
- Justin Whitlock Dart Sr. (1907–1984), American entrepreneur
- Justin Whitlock Dart Jr. (1930–2002), American disability activist
- Kenneth Dart (born 1955), American businessman and billionaire
- Leslee Dart, American publicist and entrepreneur
- Raymond Dart (1893–1988), Australian anatomist and anthropologist
- Rollin Dart (1925–2016), American banker
- Tom Dart (born 1962), American lawyer and politician, and sheriff of Cook County, Illinois
- Thurston Dart (1921–1971), British musicologist
- William A. Dart (1814–1890), American lawyer and politician
- Yoshiko Dart, disability rights activist
