= Margaret Nosek =

American activist (1952–2020)

- Margaret Nosek, from a 1984 newspaper.
- Born: Margaret Ann Nosek; January 25, 1952; Schenectady, New York
- Died: November 21, 2020 (aged 68); Houston, Texas
- Other names: Peg Nosek
- Occupations: Professor of rehabilitation medicine, researcher

Margaret Ann "Peg" Nosek (January 25, 1952 – November 21, 2020) was an American academic and disability rights activist based in Houston, Texas.

== Early life and education ==
Nosek was born in Schenectady, New York, the daughter of Stanley Michael Nosek and Regina Ann Nosek (née Bernatowicz). Her father was a mechanical engineer. She was diagnosed at age 2 with a progressive form of spinal muscular atrophy, and used a wheelchair. She was raised in Ohio, and graduated from Baldwin Wallace College in Berea, Ohio in 1974, with a Bachelor of Fine Arts degree. She earned a master's degree in music history from Case Western Reserve University in 1976. She moved to Texas to pursue a doctorate in music theory at the University of Texas at Austin; she instead completed a second master's degree, in rehabilitation counseling, in 1982, and a doctorate in rehabilitation research, in 1984. In 1993, she was named one of the Outstanding Young Texas Exes by the university's alumni association.

== Career ==
Nosek, an accomplished composer, oboeist and recorder player, taught music courses at Baldwin Wallace College while she was in graduate school in Cleveland and Austin in the 1970s. She worked with disability rights activists including Judith Heumann, Lex Frieden, Ed Roberts, and Justin Dart in the 1980s, in the organizing and strategizing leading to the Americans with Disabilities Act in 1990. She was co-author, with Yoshiko Dart, Yayoi Narita, and Justin Dart, on an influential working paper, "A Philosophical Foundation for the Independent Living & Disability Rights Movements" (1982). In 1983, she testified before a Congressional hearing on access to voting for disabled citizens, and participated in a public transit protest in El Paso.

Nosek was a professor of physical medicine and rehabilitation at Baylor College of Medicine. She was director of Baylor's Independent Living Research Use Program, and director Baylor's Center for Research on Women with Disabilities, which she founded in 1993. She was also an adjunct professor in the College of Nursing at Texas Woman's University in Denton. In 2014 she joined the staff at TIRR Memorial Hermann, to create a dedicated women's program in the hospital's outpatient clinic. She was president of Health Care for All Texas, and in her later years became interested in the possibilities of Second Life for organizing and outreach to people with physical disabilities.

Nosek held grants from the National Institutes of Health, Centers for Disease Control and Prevention and the National Institute on Disability and Rehabilitation Research. She received the Disability Achievement Award from the American Public Health Association in 2007, and the 2017 Garrett Award from the American Rehabilitation Counseling Association.

In 2018, Nosek was an inspiration and central figure in "Breath", a site-specific work of music, dance, and visual arts, performed at Rothko Chapel in Houston.

== Personal life ==
Nosek described her domestic life in a 2009 essay titled "A Happy Compromise", explaining how she lived with several paid longterm attendants and their children, to whom she was close. "It takes about 60 percent of my salary to live like this, but I happily pay because it's the price of my freedom," she wrote. She died in 2020, aged 68 years, in Houston.
