= Justin Dart =

Justin Dart may refer to:

- Justin Whitlock Dart Sr. (1907–1984), American businessman
- Justin Whitlock Dart Jr. (1930–2002), his son, American activist
