= SunTran (disambiguation) =

SunTran or Sun Tran may refer to these United States transit agencies:

- ABQ RIDE, Albuquerque, New Mexico, formerly known as SunTran
- SunTran (Ocala), Ocala, Florida
- SunTran (St. George), St. George, Utah
- Sun Tran, Tucson, Arizona

== See also ==
- Suntrana, Alaska
