= Paul Harrington =

Paul Harrington is the name of:

- Paul Harrington (musician) (born 1960), Irish musician and Eurovision Song Contest winner
- Paul Randall Harrington (1911–1980), American orthopaedic surgeon and designer of the Harrington Rod
- Paul Harrington (pole vaulter), winner of the 1926 NCAA DI outdoor pole vault championship
