= Empire Mariner =

German-built cargo steamship

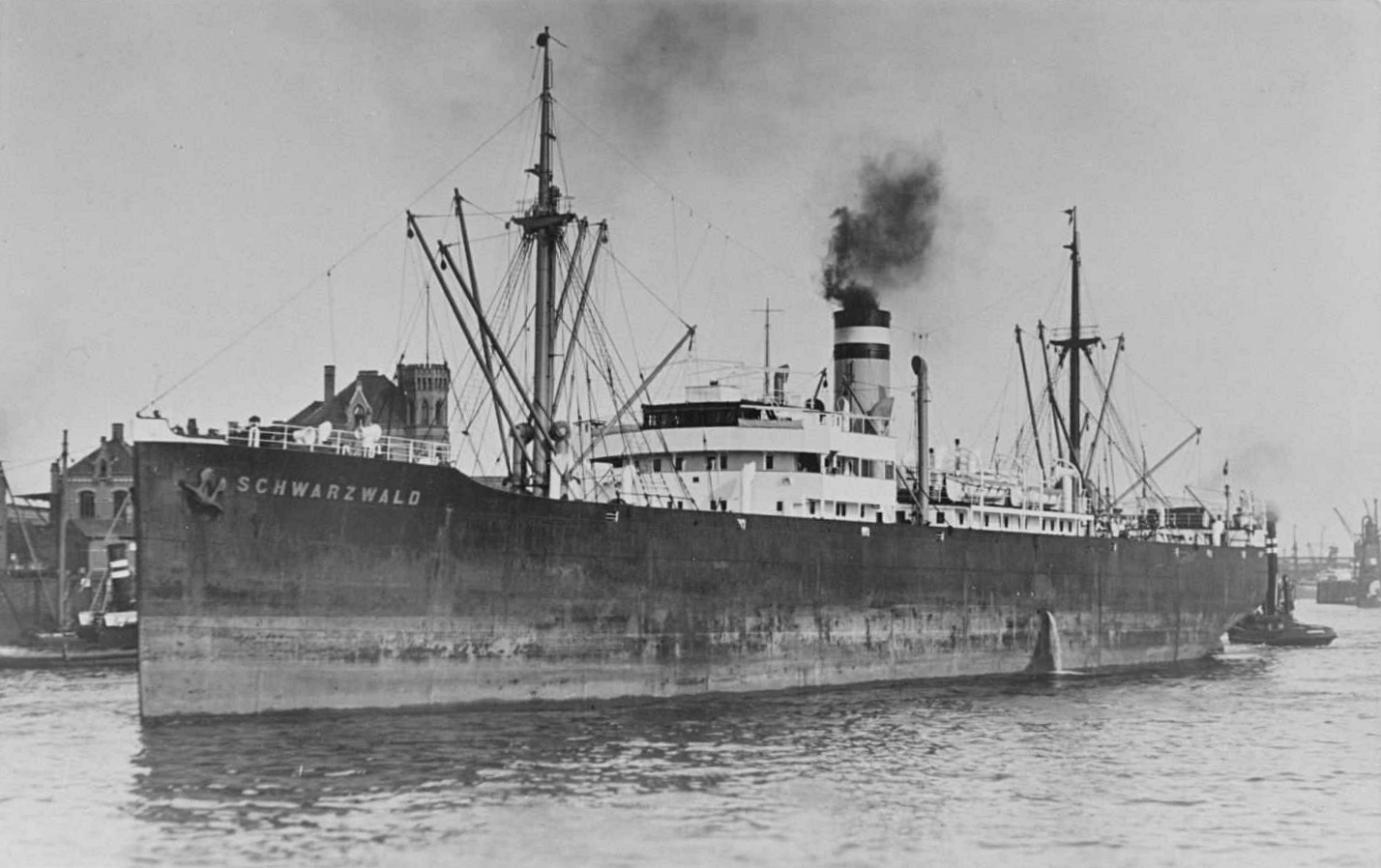
- The ship as Schwarzwald

History
- Name: 1922: Schwarzwald; 1935: Rheingold; 1940: Empire Mariner; 1946: Saint Ina; 1948: Wells City; 1951: Fausta
- Namesake: 1922: Black Forest; 1935: Das Rheingold; 1946: Saint Ina; 1948: Wells, Somerset
- Owner: 1922: Hamburg America Line; 1935: H. Vogemann; 1940: Ministry of Shipping; 1941: Ministry of War Transport; 1946: S American Saint Line; 1948: Bristol City Line; 1951: East & West SS Co
- Operator: 1940: H Hogarth & Sons
- Port of registry: 1922: (Weimar Republic) Hamburg; 1940: (United Kingdom) London; 1946: (United Kingdom) Newport; 1948: (United Kingdom) Bristol; 1951: (Pakistan) Karachi
- Builder: Deutsche Werft, Hamburg
- Completed: 1922
- Identification: 1922: code letters RCNQ; 1934: call sign DHUX; 1940: UK official number 167412; 1940: call sign GRDZ; 1951: call sign AQBH
- Fate: scrapped 1964

General characteristics
- Type: cargo ship
- Tonnage: 5,055 GRT, 3,027 NRT
- Length: 399.6 ft (121.8 m)
- Beam: 54.2 ft (16.5 m)
- Depth: 27.4 ft (8.4 m)
- Decks: 2
- Propulsion: 1 × screw; 1922: 2 × steam turbines; double-reduction gearing; 1946: 1 × triple-expansion engine
- Sensors & processing systems: submarine signalling; by 1931: wireless direction finding; by 1952: echo sounding device

Empire Mariner was a cargo steamship. She was built in Germany in 1922 for Hamburg America Line (HAPAG), who named her Schwarzwald. In 1935 H. Vogemann bought her and renamed her Rheingold. In October 1939 a Royal Navy cruiser captured her, and the United Kingdom government renamed her as the Empire ship Empire Mariner. She survived numerous transatlantic convoys in the Battle of the Atlantic. In 1946 South American Saint Line bought her and renamed her Saint Ina. In 1948 Bristol City Line bought her and renamed her Wells City. In 1951 the Pakistani-owned East & West Steamship Company bought her and renamed her Fausta. She was scrapped in Pakistan in 1964.

This was the second HAPAG steamship that was named Schwarzwald. The first was completed in 1911 and sunk by a mine in 1917. The third was completed in 1945 as Empire Nene and scrapped in the 1970s.

== A class of –wald ships ==
Between 1921 and 1923 Deutsche Werft in Hamburg built a class of ten single-screw cargo ships for HAPAG. The first two, Niederwald and Steigerwald, were completed in 1921. Each was a refrigerated cargo steamship, with a triple-expansion steam engine plus an exhaust steam turbine.

The eight ships that followed were general cargo ships, with no cargo refrigeration, and with three different propulsion systems. Westerwald, Frankenwald, Wasgenwald, Idarwald, and Kellerwald had only a triple-expansion engine, with no exhaust steam turbine. Schwarzwald was a turbine ship. The final two, Spreewald and Odenwald, were motor ships, completed in 1923.

HAPAG had previously had a series of cargo liners with names ending in "–wald". All had joined its fleet between 1907 and 1912, but the Entente Powers had captured, sunk, or confiscated them between 1914 and 1919. Most of the new class of ships built in 1921–23 re-used the names of ships from that previous series.

== Building ==
Deutsche Werft completed Schwarzwald in 1922. Her registered length was 399.6 ft (121.8 m), her beam was 54.2 ft (16.5 m), and her depth was 27.4 ft (8.4 m). Her tonnages were 5,055 GRT and 3,027 NRT. She had two AEG two steam turbines, which drove her single shaft via double-reduction gearing. Her navigation equipment included submarine signalling.

== German career ==
HAPAG registered Schwarzwald in Hamburg. Her code letters were RCNQ. By 1931 her navigation equipment included wireless direction finding. By 1934 her call sign was DHUX, and this had superseded her code letters. On 15 October 1935 H. Vogemann bought the ship and renamed her Rheingold.

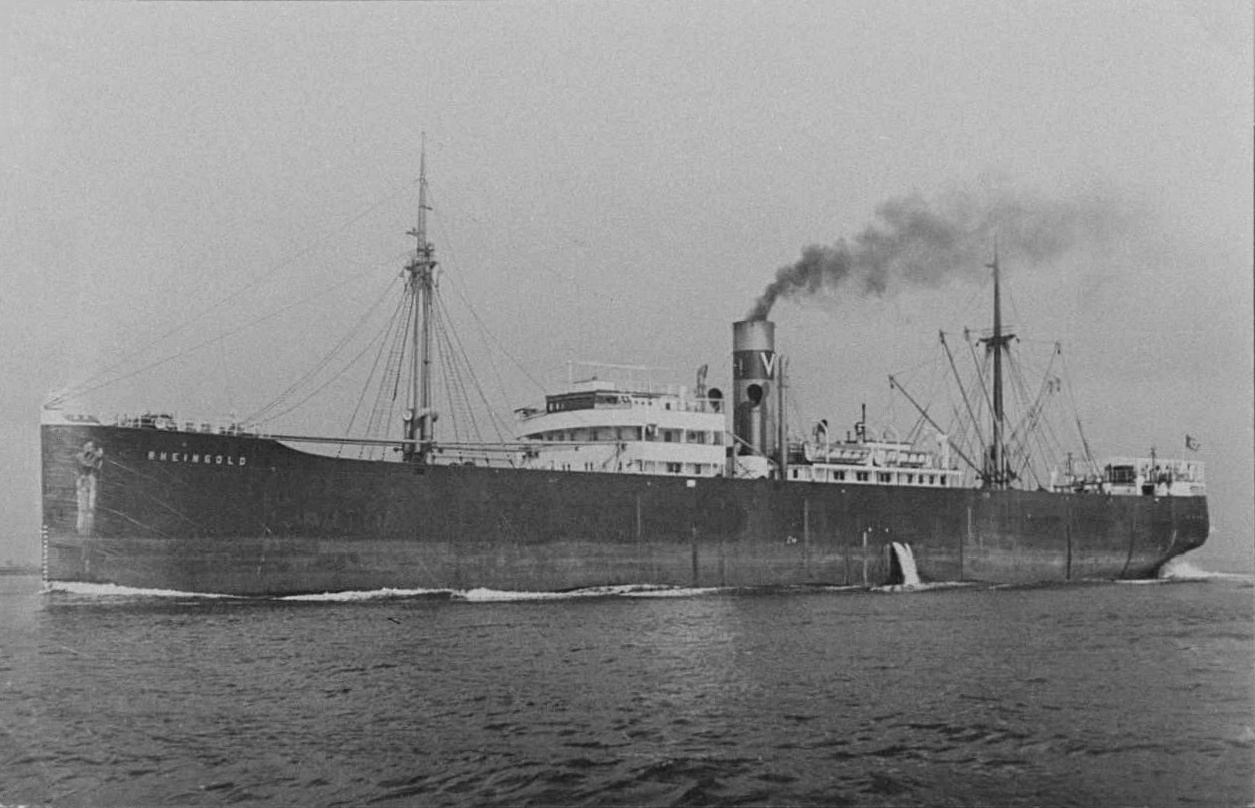
The ship as Rheingold, with H. Vogemann's "V" on her funnel

On 1 September 1939 the Invasion of Poland started the Second World War. On 27 September Rheingold left Bahia in Brazil to try to reach Germany. She headed north, through the western part of the North Atlantic, and then tried to pass between Iceland and the Faroe Islands to reach the Norwegian Sea. However, on 25 October the cruiser HMS Delhi intercepted and captured her at position 64°00′N 11°40′W. A Royal Navy prize crew took her to Kirkwall in Orkney, where she arrived on 27 October.

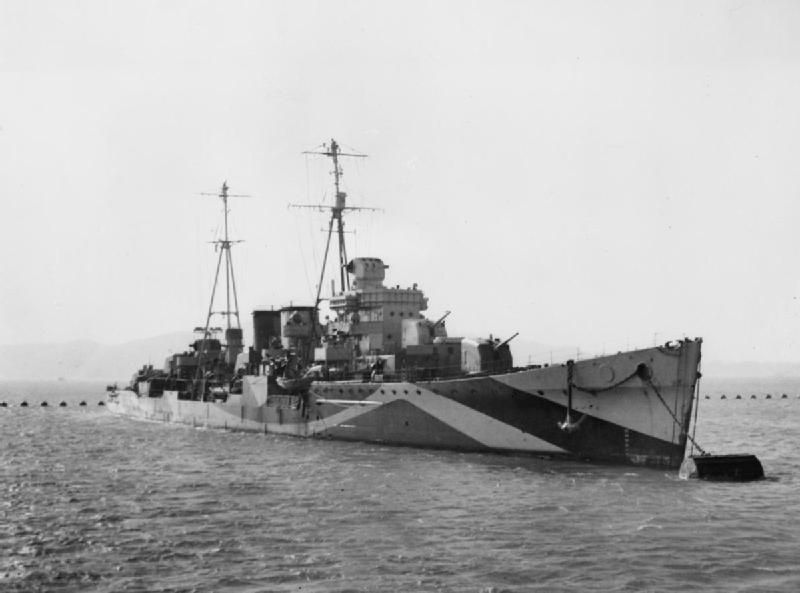
The cruiser HMS Delhi

== Empire Mariner ==
In 1940 the UK Ministry of Shipping renamed the ship Empire Mariner and registered her in London. Her UK official number was 167412 and her call sign was GRDZ. The ministry appointed H Hogarth and Sons to manage her.

From December 1940 to December 1944 Empire Mariner sailed from Nova Scotia to the British Isles in numerous HX convoys and a few SC convoys. On 14 December 1940 she left Halifax with HX 96, but lost touch with the convoy on the first night, and returned to port. On 23 December she left Nova Scotia with Convoy SC 17, this time carrying the Vice Commodore of that convoy, D MacKellar, RNR. On 31 December she lost touch with SC 17 at position 52°56′N 36°27′W. SC 17's Commodore, EW Leir, RNR, who sailed on Nailsea Court, reported "With the exception of leaders of columns the station keeping was the worst I have experienced, and was not up [word missing] to convoys speed as the ships had a margin of [words missing] or more. Visual signalling generally very slow and inaccurate."

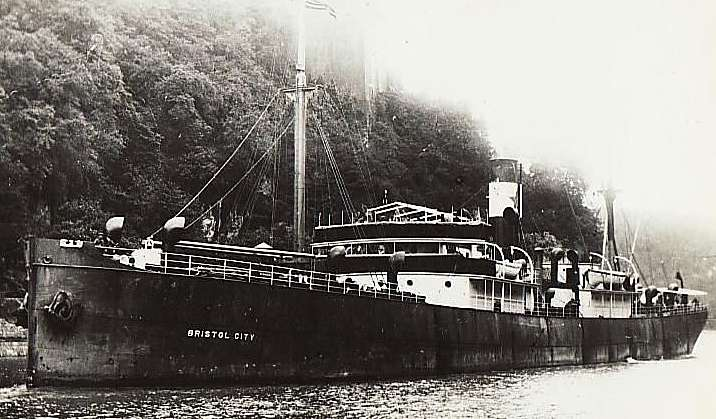
Bristol City Line's Bristol City

There is a gap in records of her movements from January 1941 until May 1942, when she sailed with Convoy SC 83, and carried its Vice Commodore. There is another gap until 2 February 1943, when she sailed from Liverpool with Convoy ON 165 to New York, and carrying the convoy Commodore, DA Casey, RNR. On 20 February her steering gear failed, forcing her to drop out at position 49°22′N 45°25′W. The Vice Commodore, in Bristol City, had to take over command of the convoy. Empire Mariner's steering gear broke down a total of three times on that crossing. Casey reported "The work performed by James MacLennan, Ch. Engineer, Alexander Cant, Ch. Officer and George Duncan, Master, all of Empire Mariner in repairing and shoring the steering gear on three occasions in very heavy weather is deserving of commendation. All three Officers took an active and zealous part in these operations. It is considered that a 'mention' would meet the circumstances."

Records of her sailing in convoys after August 1943 are sparse. On 16 November 1944 she left Halifax to join HX 320, which had started from New York. However, she turned back to Halifax, and on 21 November left again to join HX 321. On this crossing she carried 12 passengers as well as cargo. Her last convoy record of the war is from January 1945, when she sailed westbound with ON 277 from the British Isles to New York.

== Post-war career ==
By 1946 the ship had been re-engined. Her turbines had been removed, and replaced with a three-cylinder triple-expansion engine built by Duncan Stewart and Company of Glasgow.

In 1946 the South American Saint Line bought her, renamed her Saint Ina, and registered her in Newport in Monmouthshire. In 1948 Bristol City Line bought her, renamed her Wells City, and registered her in Bristol.

In 1951 the East & West Steamship Company bought the ship, renamed her Fausta, and registered her in Karachi. By 1952 her navigation equipment included an echo sounding device. She was scrapped in Pakistan in 1964.

== Bibliography ==
- Haws, Duncan (1980). The Ships of the Hamburg America, Adler and Carr Lines. Merchant Fleets in Profile. Vol. 4. Cambridge: Patrick Stephens Ltd. ISBN 0-85059-397-2.
- Lloyd's Register of Shipping. Vol. II.–Steamers and Motor Vessels. London: Lloyd's Register of Shipping. 1923 – via Internet Archive.
- Lloyd's Register of Shipping (PDF). Vol. II.–Steamers and Motorships of 300 tons gross and over. London: Lloyd's Register of Shipping. 1931 – via Southampton City Council.
- Lloyd's Register of Shipping (PDF). Vol. II.–Steamers and Motorships of 300 tons gross and over. London: Lloyd's Register of Shipping. 1934 – via Southampton City Council.
- Lloyd's Register of Shipping (PDF). Vol. II.–Steamers and Motorships of 300 tons gross and over. London: Lloyd's Register of Shipping. 1937 – via Southampton City Council.
- Lloyd's Register of Shipping (PDF). Vol. II.–Steamers and Motorships of 300 tons gross and over. London: Lloyd's Register of Shipping. 1940 – via Southampton City Council.
- Lloyd's Register of Shipping. Vol. Steamers and Motorships of 300 tons gross and over, Steamers and Motorships under 300 tons, trawlers, tugs, dredgers, &c, Sailing Vessels, List of ship owners, &c. London: Lloyd's Register of Shipping. 1946 – via Internet Archive.
- Lloyd's Register of Shipping. Vol. Steamers and Motorships of 300 tons gross and over, Steamers and Motorships under 300 tons, trawlers, tugs, dredgers, &c, Sailing Vessels, List of ship owners, &c. London: Lloyd's Register of Shipping. 1947 – via Internet Archive.
- Mitchell, WH; Sawyer, LA (1990). The Empire Ships: A Record of British-built and acquired Merchant Ships during the Second World War. London: Lloyd's of London Press. ISBN 978-1850442752.
- Register Book. Vol. II M–Z. London: Lloyd's Register of Shipping. 1949 – via Internet Archive.
- Register Book. Vol. I A–L. London: Lloyd's Register of Shipping. 1952 – via Internet Archive.
