= Paul Randall Harrington =

American orthopedic surgeon

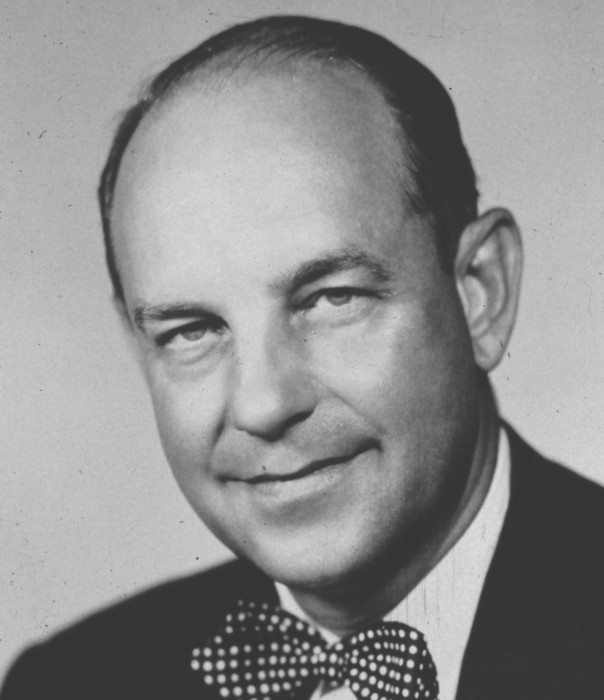
- Paul Randall Harrington
- Born: September 27, 1911; Kansas City, Kansas
- Died: November 29, 1980 (aged 69); Houston, Texas
- Education: University of Kansas Dickson-Dively Orthopaedic Surgery Residency(now UMKC)
- Years active: 1939–1980
- Known for: Design of the Harrington Rod
- Medical career
- Profession: Surgeon
- Institutions: Jefferson Davis County Hospital; Baylor College of Medicine; University of Kansas Medical Center; Saint Luke's Hospital of Kansas City
- Sub-specialties: Orthopaedic surgery
- Research: Post-poliomyelitis scoliosis
- Awards: Cora and Webb Mading Medal; Nicolas Andry Award

Paul Randall Harrington (September 27, 1911 – November 29, 1980) was an American orthopaedic surgeon. He is best known as the designer of the Harrington Rod, the first device for the straightening and immobilization of the spine inside the body. It entered common use in the early 1960s and remained the gold standard for scoliosis surgery until the late 1990s. During this period over one million people benefited from Harrington's procedure.

== Early life ==
Harrington was born on September 27, 1911, and educated in the Kansas City school system, from which he graduated in 1930, having been named one of the State of Kansas' 15 most outstanding high-school graduates. He had initially not planned to go to college but changed his mind after being offered a basketball scholarship by the University of Kansas. During his time at the University of Kansas from 1931 to 1934 he competed on their basketball team, which won the Big Eight championship three years in a row. In his senior year he was elected captain of the team.

An initial interest in the field of physical education bloomed into an interest in medicine. He attended the University of Kansas School of Medicine and graduated in 1939, having worked his way through school playing semi-professional basketball. In 1936 he tried out for the national Olympic team and won the championship of his region in the javelin, but did not end up attending the finals in Chicago due to the cost involved.

Harrington undertook his internship and first year of surgical residency at Roper Hospital, Charleston, South Carolina, after which he returned to St Luke's Hospital in Kansas City, where he completed his residency in orthopaedic surgery in 1942, under Doctors Frank Dickson and Rex Dively. He then joined the United States Army.

In the Army, from May 1942 to November 1945 Harrington served as a doctor at the 77th Evacuation Hospital in World War II, acting as chief of the orthopaedic service. The 77th Evacuation Hospital was made up largely of medical practitioners from the University of Kansas Schools of Medicine and Nursing, and saw service in Europe and Africa. It was during his time with the 77th that Harrington encountered such military celebrities as General George S. Patton.

Following the war Harrington moved to Texas and worked as a surgeon at Jefferson Davis County Hospital in Houston. During the post-war years a poliomyelitis epidemic caused polio cases to swell dramatically and they eventually became his main priority. At this time he worked with the Baylor College of Medicine to create the Southwest Respiratory Foundation of the National Infantile Paralysis Association, the first such organisation in the United States.

Polio patients would sometimes develop scoliosis, a condition where the spine becomes curved laterally (from side to side). Harrington realised that existing treatments for scoliosis, which relied heavily on physical therapy, were inappropriate for patients paralysed by polio, and began to research new treatments. An early method he tried for scoliotic polio patients was manual correction of the scoliotic deformity at the time of surgery, and internal fixation of each facet. There were some benefits to this treatment but Harrington found that the fixation would not hold. The hooks and threaded rods used would corrode and break, causing curvature to return to the spine. Two patients of this procedure died.

Undeterred, from the late 1940s to late 1950s Harrington worked on what would eventually become known as the Harrington implant, or Harrington Rod.

== Harrington Rod ==
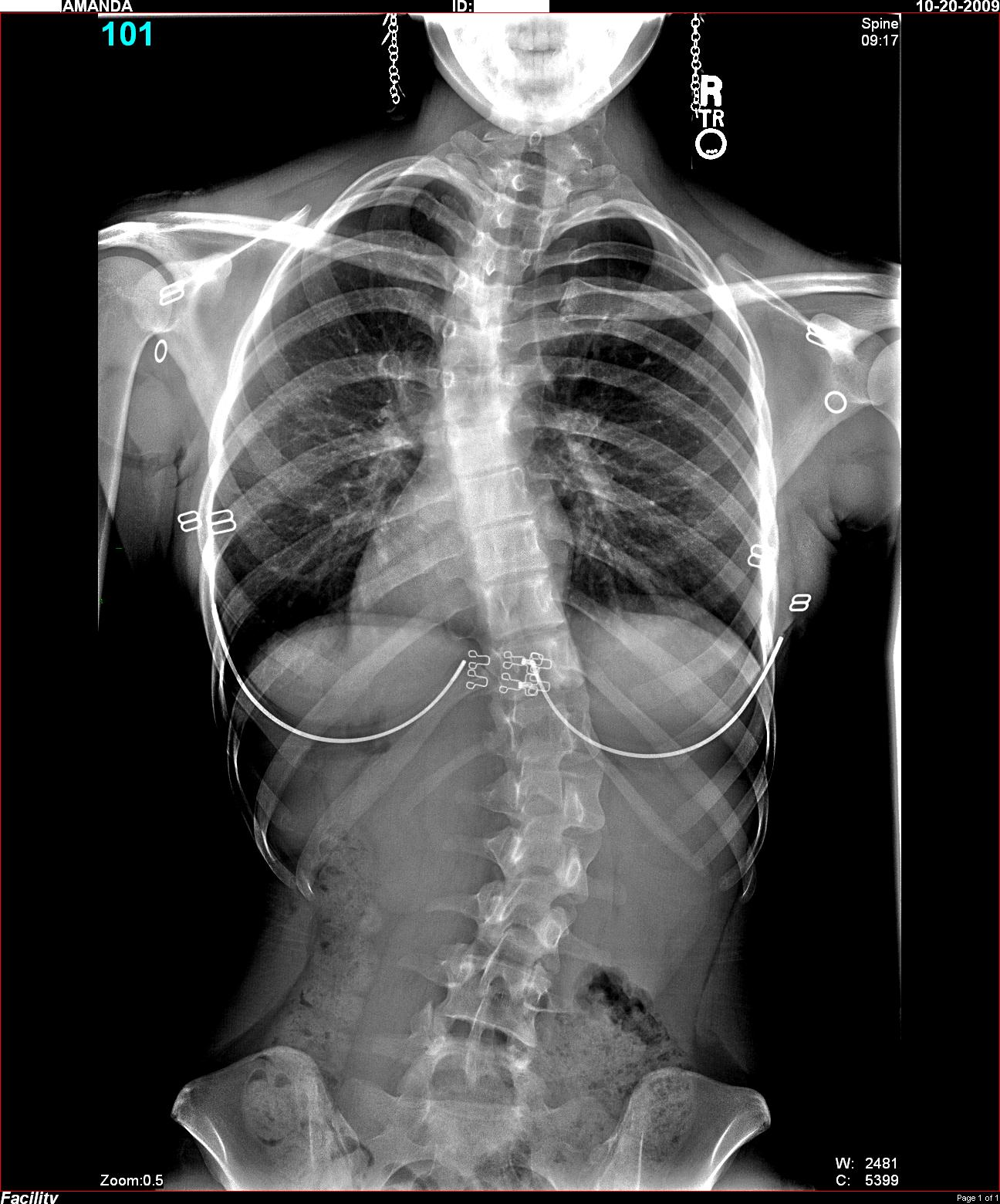
Lateral curvature of the spine in a scoliosis patient

The Harrington Rod, or Harrington implant, is a device for the straightening of the spine inside the body, designed by Paul Harrington. The device consists of a stainless steel rod, attached to the spine at the top and bottom of the curve with hooks. Attached ratchets are then tightened to distract or straighten the spine. Following surgery to insert the rod, the patient wears a postoperative plaster cast or brace for a few months, until vertebral fusion has occurred, after which the cast or brace is removed.

Harrington's first uses of the device that would become the Harringon Rod involved creating fresh instruments on the night before a prospective surgery. Following the surgery, he would modify the design for use on the next patient, making alterations based on his perception of the surgery outcome.

Once Harrington was satisfied with the basic design, he arranged for extensive testing of the instruments at the Engineering Department at Rice University in Houston, Texas, and at a commercial testing company in Chicago, Illinois.

He publicly presented the process at the Annual Meeting of the American Academy of Orthopaedic Surgeons in Chicago in 1958, where it was met with "astonishment and deep skepticism".

However, the process slowly gained acceptance. In 1959 Harrington contracted with the medical manufacturing firm Zimmer to make his instrumentation available to other doctors. He insisted that no one be allowed to use the rods without first seeing him demonstrate the procedure. Time Magazine reported in 1960, "Some ailments seem almost preferable to their cures. A case in point is scoliosis, an abnormal curvature of the spine that occurs in childhood. [The] treatment seems so punishing that [parents] cannot be persuaded to permit it even to save their children from permanent deformity. Last week Houston surgeon Paul Harrington, MD, was winning converts to a new and happier method."

The major drawback of the Harrington Rod is that it straightens out the normal front to back curvature of the segment of the spine that is fused, which in many patients results in a flat back deformity, also known as "flatback syndrome". Advances in surgical techniques and technology in the late 1990s were eventually able, in most cases, to correct scoliosis without causing flatback syndrome, leading to the gradual phasing out of the Harrington Rod.

== Late life ==
During the late 1950s and early 1960s, Harrington traveled extensively, demonstrating the techniques associated with the Harrington Rod. During this time he developed an interest in boats, which led to designing and building a 54-foot aluminium catamaran. He also dabbled in photography and high-fidelity systems.

In 1966, Harrington was one of the founding members of the Scoliosis Research Society, of which he later served as President from 1972 to 1973. He also acted as orthopaedic consultant to the United States Air Force and United States Army in San Antonio, Texas.

He acted as a Professor of the Division of Orthopaedic Surgery and a Professor of the Department of Rehabilitation at Baylor College of Medicine. In 1973 he received the Cora and Webb Mading Medal from TIRR Memorial Hermann, formerly the Institute for Rehabilitation and Research, and Baylor College of Medicine, and in the same year he also received the Nicolas Andry Award from the Association of Bone and Joint Surgeons. In 1975 he received a Most Distinguished Alumnus Award from the Medical Alumni Association at the University of Kansas.

Between 1972 and his death in 1980, Harrington worked with Marc Addason Asher to institute the Mary Alice and Paul R. Harrington Distinguished Professorship of Molecular Orthopedics at Kansas University Medical College.

== Death and legacy ==
Harrington died in Houston, Texas, on November 29, 1980.

In an obituary following his death, the Journal of Bone and Joint Surgery said, "Paul will be remembered not only for the development of the Harrington instruments, but for his straightforward frankness, his bowties, his par golf, his smile, his trumpet, and above all for being a nice person."

By will, Harrington left his professional materials to the University of Kansas Medical Center, where they are now known as the Harrington Archives (a subset of the Spine and Orthopedic Historical Collections). The archives contain "Harrington's professional papers, photographs, publications, manuscripts, blueprints, drawings, and examples of the Harrington Rod." They also include "biographical information, presentations, professional correspondence files, personal correspondence, personal photographs, movies, and videotapes. Display cases in the archives exhibit photographs, documents, and artifacts that depict the history of Harrington's life and career."

In 1992, Harrington's writings were collected by Nancy J. Hulston and Marc A. Asher in The Collected Writings of Paul Randall Harrington, MD, published by Lowell Press. In 2015, Marc A. Asher published Dogged Persistence: Harrington, Post-Polio Scoliosis and the Origin of Spine Instrumentation, which chronicles his development of the Harrington Rod.

Baylor College of Medicine awards the Paul Harrington Award for Excellence in Orthopaedic Research in recognition of Harrington's contribution to spinal surgery.

== See also ==
- Baylor College of Medicine
- Harrington implant
- Scoliosis
- Scoliosis Research Society
