= Exeter City (1887) =

British steamship

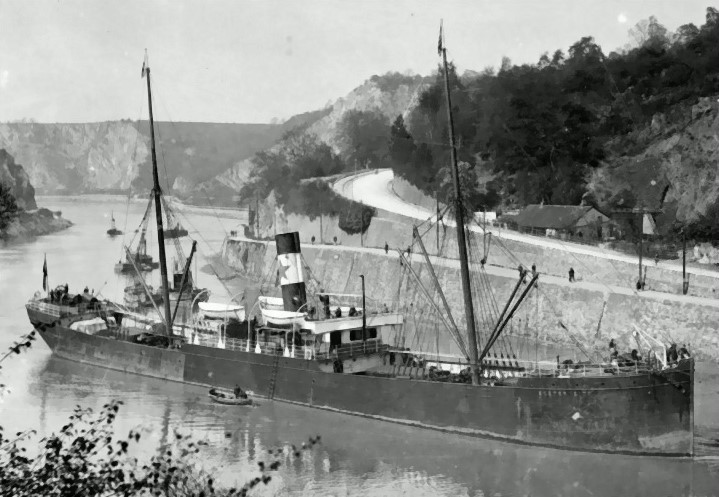
- The Exeter City in the Avon Gorge, Bristol.

History

United Kingdom
- Name: Exeter City
- Operator: Bristol City Line
- Port of registry: (United Kingdom) Bristol, UK
- Builder: Blyth Shipbuilding Company
- Launched: 18 October 1887
- Fate: Scrapped in 1925

General characteristics
- Type: Passenger-cargo ship
- Tonnage: 2,140 GRT
- Length: 289 ft (88 m)
- Beam: 39 ft (12 m)
- Propulsion: 3-cylinder triple expansion engine; single screw
- Speed: 10 kn (19 km/h; 12 mph)

The Exeter City was the first of two British cargo steamers of that name built for the Bristol City Line that plied the route between Bristol and New York.

== Construction ==
The ship was built by Blyth Shipbuilding and Dry Docks Company in 1887 to the three-island principle. It was the first of two cargo steamers of that name built for the Bristol City Line, who had a practice of naming their ships after notable cities. The ship was of 289 ft with a beam of 39 ft. It was driven by a triple-expansion mechanism and made around ten knots. The funnel colours for the line were black with white band containing a blue, five pointed star.

== Career ==
The ship would have plied the service between Bristol and New York which the Bristol line started in 1879 and continued until the 1970s. The Exeter City was scrapped in Genoa, Italy, in 1925.
