= Bristol City Line =

Shipping line based in Bristol, England

House flag

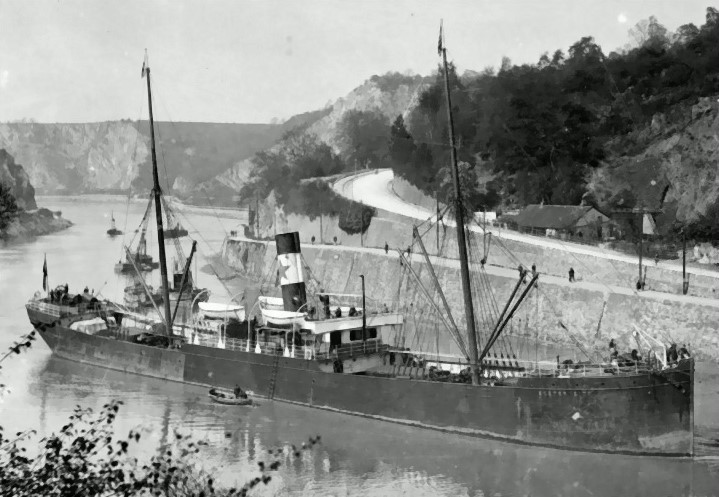
Exeter City (1887) in the Avon Gorge, Bristol.

Bristol City Line was a British shipping line based in Bristol, England that traded from 1704 until 1974. From 1760 Bristol City Line also built ships.

The company's fleet was distinguished with the name of each ship ending in "City", and named after cities in Britain, the US and Canada. Some names were re-used up to five times for successive ships.

== Early steamship services ==
Bristol City Line started a regular transatlantic steamship service between Bristol and New York in 1879. The early years of the service were troubled by shipwrecks. The first SS Bristol City sailed from New York on 28 December 1880 and was lost. Just under a year later, on 3 December 1881, her sister ship the first SS Bath City sprang a leak off Grand Banks, Newfoundland and sank. 14 months after that, on 23 February 1883 the first SS Gloucester City struck an ice floe and sank. On 10 February 1887 the first SS Wells City collided with the SS Lone Star in the Hudson River and sank. She was salvaged but sold. In July 1893 Llandaff City successfully towed the crippled transatlantic Liner Olympia with 250 passengers aboard after the latter had been drifting for four days with a broken shaft. On 23 February 1900 the second SS Bath City was wrecked on Lundy Island in the Bristol Channel. On 31 January 1904 the first SS Boston City collided with SS Colardo and was beached off Sandy Hook, New Jersey. She was refloated but sold.

== First World War ==
On 19 August 1915 the German submarine U-24 shelled and sank the second SS New York City about 40 miles off Fastnet Rock. On 30 August 1917 SS Kansas City sailed from New York and was lost. On 18 December 1917 SM U-94 torpedoed the second SS Bristol City off the south coast of Ireland with the loss of 30 lives. On 2 January 1918 SM U-91 torpedoed and sank the second SS Boston City in St. George's Channel.

== Between the wars ==
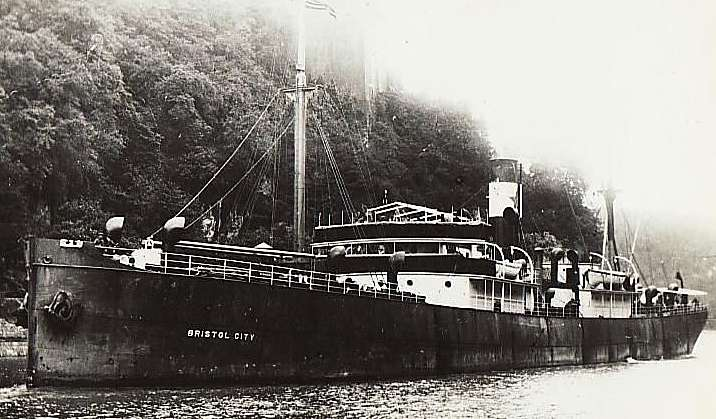
Bristol City (1919)

In January 1933 the second SS Exeter City was abandoned in a gale and sank about 600 miles southeast of Cape Race, Newfoundland. The company added a service to Canada in the same year.

== Second World War ==
On 1 July 1941 the first SS Toronto City was serving as a weather ship in the Atlantic when U-108 torpedoed and sank her with the loss of all hands. On 21 December 1942 U-591 torpedoed and sank the first SS Montreal City in the Atlantic. On 5 May 1943 U-358 torpedoed and sank the third SS Bristol City.

== Post war operations and takeover ==
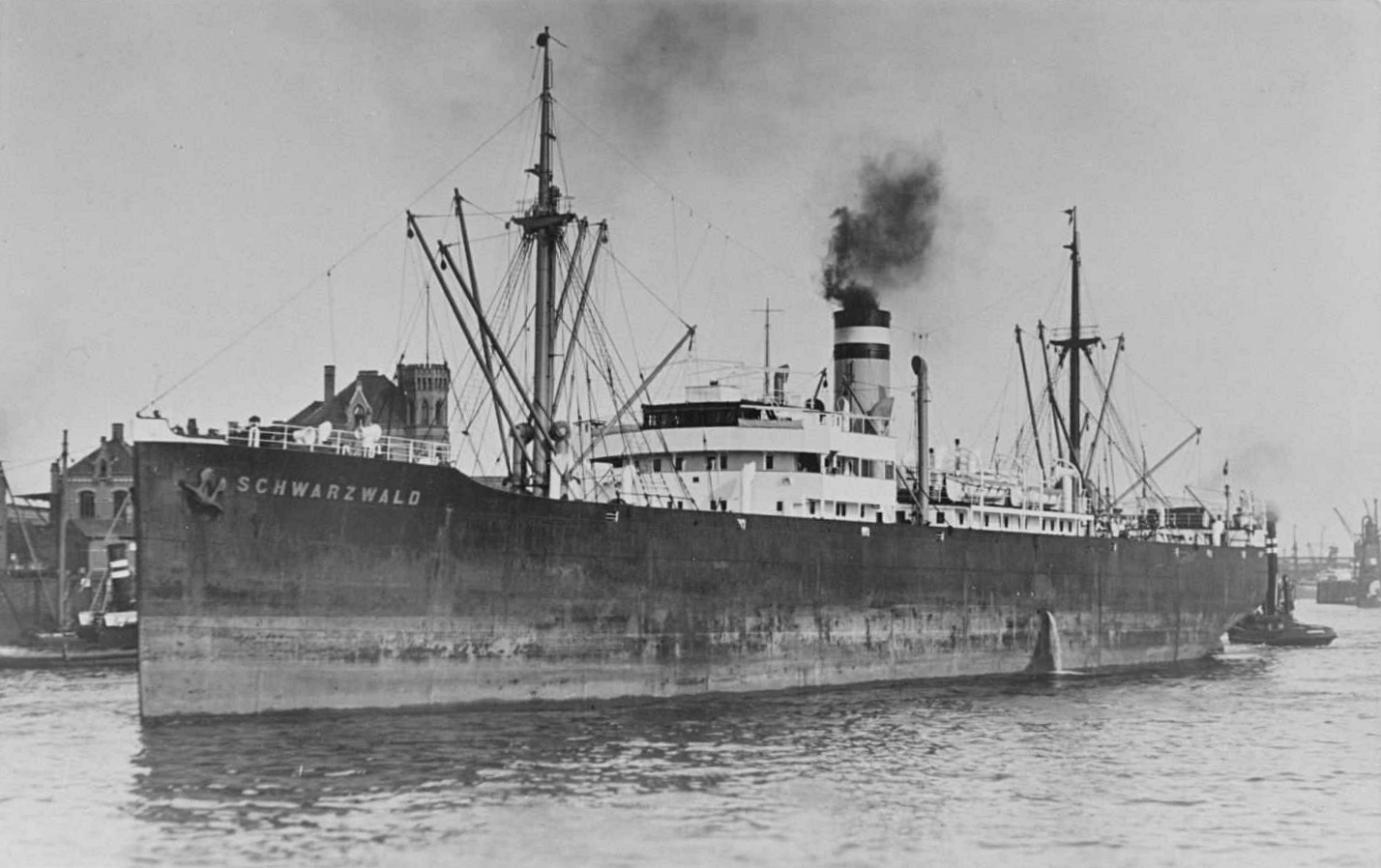
Empire Mariner, which the company bought in 1948 and renamed Wells City

The company extended its Canadian service to the Great Lakes in 1958.

In 1970 the company's first container ship was launched. However, in 1971 Bibby Line took over the company and the ship was completed as the 31,036 MV Dart America, a vessel that was crewed and managed for Clarke Traffic Services Ltd of Montreal. Her sister ship MV Dart Atlantic was launched in 1971. In 1972 MV Halifax City was sold to Thai owners and MV Coventry City and the third MV Toronto City were transferred to Bibby Line. In 1974 Dart America was transferred to Bibby Line, leaving only Dart Atlantic which was sold to C.Y. Tung in 1980. The two Dart class vessels were operated as part of the Dart Container Line consortium.
