= Darts (disambiguation) =

Darts is a throwing game.

Darts may also refer to:

- Doctor of Arts (D.Arts), a doctoral degree
- Differentiable ARchiTecture Search, a neural architecture search method

== Music ==
- Darts (band), British doo-wop revival band
- DARTZ (New Zealand band)
- Dartz!, English math rock group
- Darts (album), by Benevento/Russo Duo, 2003
- "Darts", a song by System of a Down on the album System of a Down, 1998

== See also ==
- Dart (disambiguation)
