= TIRR Memorial Hermann =

Rehabilitation and research center in Houston, Texas

- Memorial Hermann Healthcare System

Geography
- Location: 1333 Moursund St., Houston, Texas, United States
- Coordinates: 29.709262°N 95.394191°W

Organization
- Type: Specialist
- Affiliated university: McGovern Medical School University of Texas Health Science Center at Houston and Baylor College of Medicine
- Patron: None

Services
- Emergency department: No
- Beds: 134
- Specialty: Inpatient and outpatient rehabilitation after traumatic brain or spinal injury, or for neurologic illness

Helipads
- Helipad: Yes

History
- Founded: 1950s

Links
- Website: Official website
- Lists: Hospitals in Texas

TIRR Memorial Hermann (the four initials stand for "The Institute for Rehabilitation and Research") is a 134-bed rehabilitation hospital, rehabilitation and research center, outpatient medical clinic and network of outpatient rehabilitation centers in Houston, Texas that offers comprehensive physical, occupational, and speech therapy services to rehabilitate patients following traumatic brain or spinal injury or to those suffering from neurologic illnesses.

TIRR Memorial Hermann's main campus offers inpatient rehabilitation in the Texas Medical Center in Houston, Texas. There are 5 outpatient rehabilitation locations in the greater Houston area, including Kirby Glen, Memorial City, Greater Heights, Sugar Land, and The Woodlands.

TIRR Memorial Hermann is a teaching hospital for Baylor College of Medicine and McGovern Medical School at the University of Texas Health Science Center at Houston.

== History ==
TIRR Memorial Hermann opened in the early 1950s when polio was at the height of its epidemic in the United States. At the beginning of that decade, William A. Spencer established one of the first polio treatment centers in Houston. The Southwestern Poliomyelitis Respiratory Center was dedicated to patient treatment and research.

Spencer was involved in developing the physiograph, a device recognized in the March 22, 1954 issue of Life magazine for its ability to record vital functions. This technology advanced teaching and research efforts and is credited as a predecessor of more modern medical monitoring systems.

In 1959, TIRR opened in the Texas Medical Center. With the discovery of the polio vaccine in the 1960s, the disease became less of a threat. The hospital then began focusing on the rehabilitation of patients with spinal cord deterioration caused by disease or trauma, pioneering the interdisciplinary team approach to rehabilitation.

It was also in the 1960s that William Spencer recruited a number of visionary physicians from several different disciplines who had appointments in numerous academic departments but spent significant amounts of their clinical and research time at the relatively small building at the rear of the then rapidly enlarging and expanding Texas Medical Center. Gunyon Harrison, a pediatrician with an interest in cystic fibrosis cared for the children in Greater Houston area with this disease. Carlos Vallbona, a pediatrician, physiologist, and cardiologist from Barcelona Spain, also had appointments at Baylor College of Medicine. Paul Harrington, an orthopedic surgeon, developed a new approach to this disease using what became known as "Harrington Rods", inserted from the back and straightening the backs of these deformed children. A young ear nose and throat specialist, Bobby Alford was still in his residency, performed many bronchoscopies needed for the polio and cystic fibrosis patients.

== Academic affiliations ==
TIRR Memorial Hermann is the primary training site for the Physical Medicine & Rehabilitation residency program at The University of Texas Health Science Center at Houston, McGovern Medical School. From 1996 until 2016, Baylor College of Medicine and The University of Texas Health Science Center at Houston formed the BCM/UTHSCH PM&R Alliance. The alliance was the largest physical medicine and rehabilitation residency training program in the nation.

== Research programs ==
The TIRR Memorial Hermann Research Center is a facility for research into rehabilitative medicine. Four of its major research programs include the Brain Injury Research Center, the Spinal Cord Injury and Disability Research Center, the NeuroRecovery Research Center, and the Independent Living Research Utilization.

The Brain Injury and Stroke Program at TIRR Memorial Hermann has been designated a Traumatic Brain Injury Model System for nearly three decades, and was funded as a Rehabilitation and Research Training Center of excellence in TBI for over 20 years.

The mission of the Spinal Cord Injury and Disability Research Center (SCIDR) is to improve functional recovery, health and quality of life for individuals with spinal cord injury and other physical disabilities. SCIDR had been conducting research on SCI long before 1972, when it became among the first inpatient rehabilitation programs to be designated as a Model System of Care by the National Institute for Disability and Rehabilitation Research (NIDRR). SCIDR was the first to conduct 40-year follow-up interviews on those early research participants, and SCIDR continues to follow study participants over time at five-year intervals.

The NeuroRecovery Research Center (NRRC) forms the umbrella for seven independent laboratories at TIRR Memorial Hermann that collaborate on basic science studies and clinical trials. Research under way at the NRRC is supported by the National Institutes of Health; Memorial Hermann Foundation; Mission Connect, a project of TIRR Foundation; TIRR Memorial Hermann; and McGovern Medical School at UTHealth.

Established in 1977, the Independent Living Research Utilization (ILRU) provides comprehensive resources necessary to achieve an advanced level of independence once a rehabilitation patient is discharged from care. The ILRU program at TIRR Memorial Hermann is led by Lex Frieden, a chairperson of the board of the National Council on Disability (NCD) and president of Rehabilitation International. ILRU serves as a comprehensive information resource on the Americans with Disabilities Act (ADA). Housed at ILRU, the ADA Resource Center provides training, technical assistance and informational resources to employers, consumers, architects, businesses, media and disability organizations. ILRU is funded through private foundation grants and grants from public agencies, including the United States Department of Education, the United States Department of Health and Human Services, and the United States Department of Labor.

== Notable physicians and professionals ==
- Lex Frieden – disability policy expert, disability rights activist, architect of the Americans with Disabilities Act and director of the Independent Living Research Utilization (ILRU) program at TIRR Memorial Hermann
- Paul Randall Harrington, M.D. - designer of the Harrington Rod, the first device for the straightening and immobilization of the spine inside the body

== Bibliography ==
- American Rehabilitation: AR, vol. 21–22, United States: U.S. Department of Health, Education, and Welfare, [Rehabilitation Services Administration], 1995, pp. vol 21: 38, vol 22: 34, 35, ISSN 0362-4048
- Wooten, Heather Green (October 25, 2009), The Polio Years in Texas: Battling a Terrifying Unknown (1st ed.), College Station, TX: Texas A&M University Press, pp. 166–167, ISBN 9781603441650
- Verville, Richard (August 16, 2009), War, Politics, and Philanthropy: The History of Rehabilitation Medicine, Landham, MD: University Press of America, pp. 190, 197, 221, 230, ISBN 9780761845959
