= USS Quincy (AK-10) =

Cargo ship of the United States Navy

History

German Empire
- Name: Vogesen
- Owner: H. Vogemann, Hamburg, Germany
- Builder: William Doxford & Sons, Sunderland, England
- Launched: 31 August 1909
- Fate: Seized in 1917 by US Customs at Pensacola, Florida
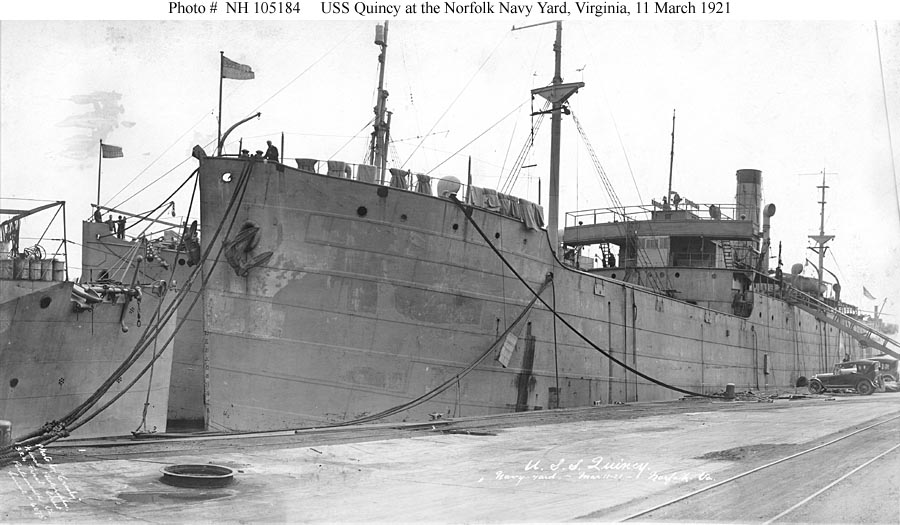
- USS Quincy (AK-10) moored at Norfolk Navy Yard, Portsmouth, VA. 11 March 1921.

United States
- Name: Quincy
- Namesake: Quincy, Massachusetts
- Acquired: 8 May 1917
- Commissioned: 2 February 1918, as USS Quincy
- Decommissioned: 5 June 1922
- Reclassified: 17 July 1920, USS Quincy (AK-10)
- Stricken: Date unknown
- Identification: Hull symbol:AK-10
- Fate: Sold, 25 September 1922, to the Navigation Steamship Co.

General characteristics
- Displacement: 6,500 long tons (6,600 t)
- Length: 367 ft (112 m)
- Beam: 51 ft (16 m)
- Draught: 21 ft 4 in (6.50 m)
- Speed: 11 knots (20 km/h; 13 mph)
- Complement: 100
- Armament: 4 × 3 in (76 mm) guns

USS Quincy (AK-10) was a cargo ship acquired by the U.S. Navy for service in World War I.

== Seizing a German freighter ==
Quincy, formerly SS Vogesen, was built in 1909 by William Doxford and Sons, Sunderland, England for H. Vogemann; acquired by NOTS 8 May 1917; and commissioned at New Orleans, Louisiana, 2 February 1918.

Upon the declaration of war with Germany, SS Vogesen was seized by Customs and Navy officials at Pensacola, Florida, and was renamed Quincy 4 June 1917. After a refit at New Orleans, Louisiana, she was quickly placed in service by NOTS as a collier.

== World War I North Atlantic operations ==
During World War I Quincy made three round trip transatlantic voyages. She sailed from Norfolk, Virginia, 27 February 1918 with a cargo of lumber destined for Paulliac, France, and returned to Norfolk 1 June. While at Norfolk she was fitted out to carry fuel oil. Quincy departed 21 July for Brest, France with a cargo of lumber, cement, and airplanes, and returned to Philadelphia, Pennsylvania, 26 September for a short refit. On her third eastward crossing she left Galveston, Texas, 1 November, bound for Genoa, Italy with a cargo of aviation material. On the return voyage, Quincy called at Gibraltar to take on a Navy cargo, and arrived at Philadelphia 25 March 1919. Quincy subsequently carried cargo between U.S. east coast ports and visited Guantánamo Bay and St. Thomas, Virgin Islands.

== Post-war activity ==
After the war Quincy continued to operate along the U.S. East Coast. She was designated AK–10 on 17 July 1920. From August 1920 until May 1921 she was laid up at Norfolk. Quincy got underway 13 May for Gibraltar and Brest. Upon her return to the U.S. she remained on the east coast a short time and then sailed to the California coast via the Panama Canal making various calls en route to take on and discharge cargo. Quincy arrived at Mare Island Navy Yard, California, 3 November 1921 and visited Hawaii in January–February 1922. She returned to Philadelphia 11 April.

== Decommissioning ==
Quincy decommissioned at Philadelphia 5 June 1922 and was sold 25 September 1922 to the Navigation Steamship Co.

== Civilian career ==
After being sold on multiple occasions, in 1936 she was sold again and was renamed Burego Star, and in 1937 she was resold to Chinese interests and renamed Haida. She was declared missing after sailing from Seattle for Hong Kong on October 24, 1937 with a cargo of sulfur that was believed to be headed for China for use in its munitions industry. She was likely torpedoed by a Japanese I-Boat.
