= H. Vogemann =

H. Vogemann Group
- Company type: Privately held company
- Industry: Ship transport
- Founded: April 22, 1886
- Headquarters: Hamburg, Germany
- Key people: Johann Heinrich Vogemann, Founder
- Website: www.vogemann.de

The H. Vogemann Group is a German shipping company. Founded in 1886, the company is privately owned by its managing partners and its fleet of bulk carriers has a capacity of more than 1.5 million tonnes deadweight (DWT).

== Overview ==
The group consists of two companies: Bereederungsgesellschaft H. Vogemann and H. Vogemann GmbH The former focuses on the fleet's commercial management, and the latter on the company's dry bulk cargo chartering business.

The Bereederungsgesellschaft H. Vogemann company handles the operations and commercial management of the group's fleet. It buys and sells vessels, handles financing and bookkeeping, and handles insurance placement and handling of claims. This company also handles currency hedging and market projection functions.

The H. Vogemann GmbH business unit acts as independent chartering brokers. The company focuses on worldwide dry bulk shipping, providing voyage estimates, full post-fixing services, and customised services.

== History ==
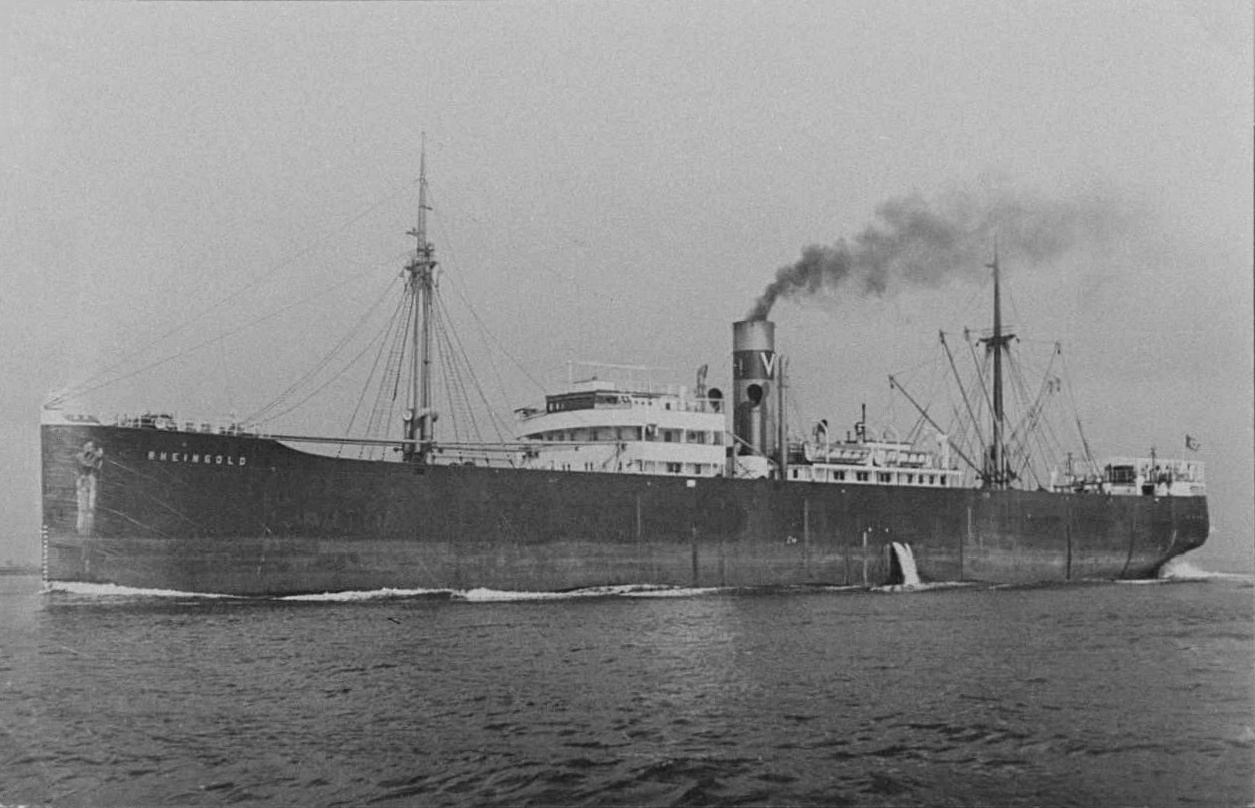
A later Rheingold, formerly HAPAG's Schwarzwald

Johann Heinrich Vogemann registered the H. Vogemann company in the Hamburg commercial register on April 22, 1886. The company's first ship was the sailing vessel Western Chief, followed shortly by the Walküre and Rheingold. These early ships mostly in European trade, but the company soon entered the Hamburg to New York market.

This move put the fledgling company in direct competition with Hamburg America Line (HAPAG), which was at the time the largest shipping company in the world. Vogemann time-chartered several 10,000 to 12,000-ton tweendeckers to compete in this market. The company was competitive enough that by 1902, HAPAG started to pay H. Vogelmann to stay out of the North Atlantic market. This compensation was paid until the start World War I.

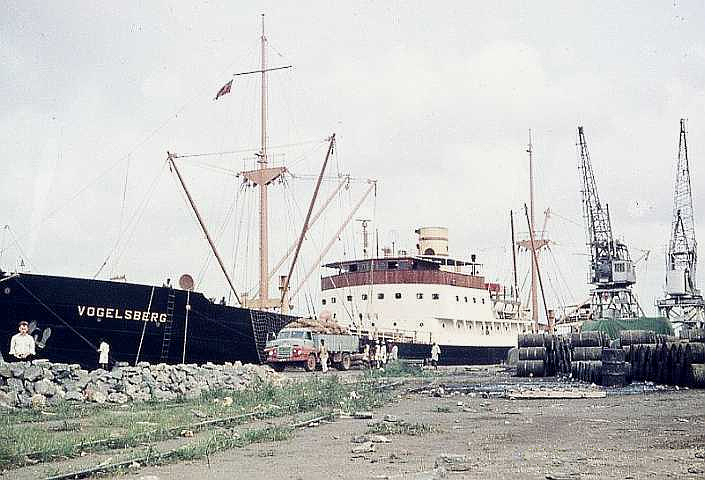
Vogelsberg in Freetown in 1958

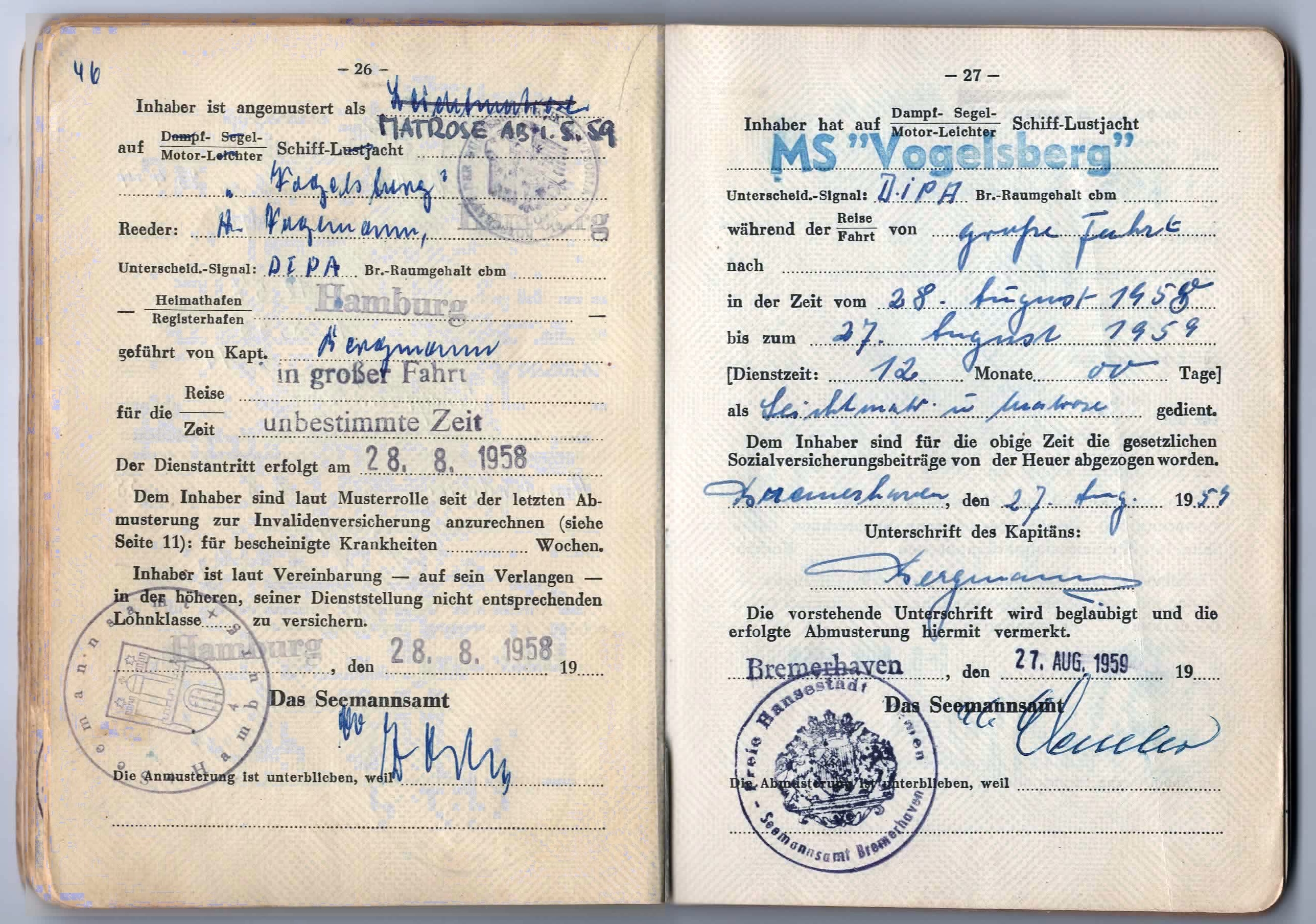
Discharge book of an able seaman of Vogelsberg

World War I brought the company close to ruin. The first blow was that it lost all of its ships early on. Then, when the United States entered the war in 1917, Vogemann could no longer trade in the US and had to close its offices in New York, Savannah, New Orleans and Norfolk. After the war, Vogemann was able to re-enter the US market and rebuild its fleet. Business with American concerns was particularly important due to the rampant post-war inflation in Germany.

World War II caused the company similar severe problems. By 1942 the company had lost all its ships for the second time. It was forced to close all its foreign branch offices by 1945. During the war, it was allowed to operate captured foreign ships, but at the end of the war, it was forced to give up all these vessels.

After World War II, the company started to rebuild focusing only on chartering broker business. After 1950 the shipping company acquired three ships used the last of which, MV Vogelsberg, had to be sold at the beginning of 1962. In later years, the company has built its fleet to 19 vessels, added new partners, and had begun to diversify into other industries.

== Fleet ==
H. Vogemann's fleet currently consists of 19 bulk carriers. In terms of size designations, 6 are capesize, 7 are panamax-size, and 6 are handysize. In terms of capacity, they range from the Voge Eva at 23,407 DWT to the Voge Master at 174,093 DWT, with an average capacity of 87,301 DWT. The average age of ships in the fleet is 11 years, with ships ranging from two to nineteen years of age.

The company's newbuild program calls for 15 ships to be built between 2008 and 2012. It calls for construction of a capesize bulker of 176,800 DWT in 2008, two oil tankers with capacity of 38,500 DWT in 2009, and 12 handysize bulkers of 35,000 DWT to be delivered between 2010 and 2012.

== See also ==
- USS Quincy (AK-10)
