= Bristol City (1919) =

British cargo steamship sunk in the Second World War

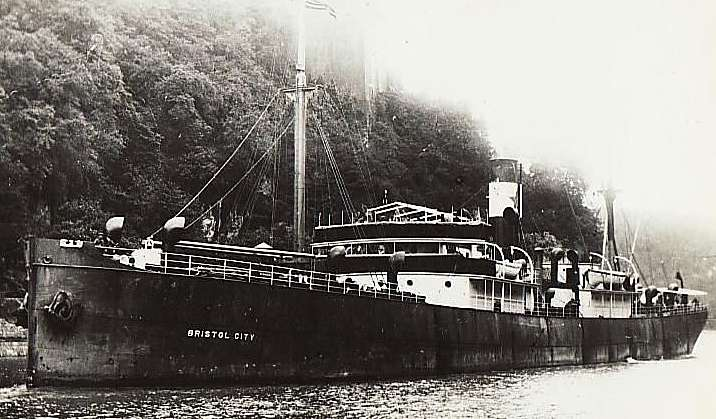
- Bristol City

History

United Kingdom
- Name: Bristol City
- Namesake: Bristol
- Owner: Bristol City Line
- Operator: CG Hill & CL Hill
- Port of registry: Bristol
- Builder: Charles Hill & Sons
- Yard number: 135
- Launched: 1 November 1919
- Completed: March 1920
- Identification: UK official number 134722; until 1933: code letters KDWC; by 1930: call sign GDML
- Fate: Sunk 5 May 1943

General characteristics
- Type: cargo ship
- Tonnage: 2,858 GRT, 1,713 NRT
- Length: 316.5 ft (96.5 m)
- Beam: 43.8 ft (13.4 m)
- Draught: 32 ft 10 in (10.0 m)
- Depth: 23.6 ft (7.2 m)
- Decks: 2
- Installed power: 357 NHP
- Propulsion: 1 × triple-expansion engine; 1 × screw
- Speed: 10 knots (19 km/h)
- Crew: 37 + 7 DEMS gunners
- Sensors & processing systems: by 1932: wireless direction finding
- Notes: sister ship: Boston City

Bristol City was a British cargo steamship that was launched in 1919 and sunk in the Battle of the Atlantic in 1943. She was the third of five ships of that name owned by Bristol City Line.

== Building and identification ==
Bristol City Line lost four ships to enemy action in the First World War, including the second Bristol City. In 1919 and 1920 Charles Hill & Sons of Bristol built a pair of new ships for company. Yard number 135 was launched on 1 November 1919 as Bristol City, and completed in March 1920. Her sister ship was built as yard number 136, launched on 12 June 1920 as Boston City, and completed that August.

Bristol City's registered length was 316.5 ft (96.5 m), her beam was 43.8 ft (13.4 m), her depth was 23.6 ft (7.2 m) and her draught was 32 ft 10 in (10.0 m). Her tonnages were 2,858 GRT and 1,713 NRT. She had a single screw, driven by a three-cylinder triple-expansion engine built by Richardsons Westgarth & Company of Hartlepool. It was rated at 357 NHP and gave her a speed of 10 knots (19 km/h).

Bristol City Line registered Bristol City at Bristol. Her UK official number was 134722 and her code letters were KDWC. By 1930 her call sign was GDML, and by 1934 this had superseded her code letters. By 1932 she was equipped with wireless direction finding.

== Loss ==
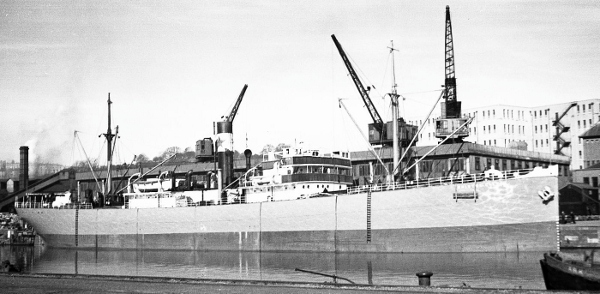
Bristol City in Bristol in 1938

In December 1940 Bristol City was damaged by a bomb dropped on Albion Dockyard during the Bristol Blitz. She was repaired and returned to service.

In April 1943 Bristol City left Bristol carrying 2,500 tons of general cargo, including china clay. Her Master was Captain Arthur Webb. He commanded a crew of 36, plus seven DEMS gunners: four Royal Navy and three British Army. Going via Milford Haven she joined Convoy ONS 5, which left Port of Liverpool on 21 April and was bound for Halifax, Nova Scotia. U-boats wolf packs attacked ONS 5 from 27 April onward. The convoy lost only two ships until 5 May, when U-boats sank 11 ships in a single day, including Bristol City.

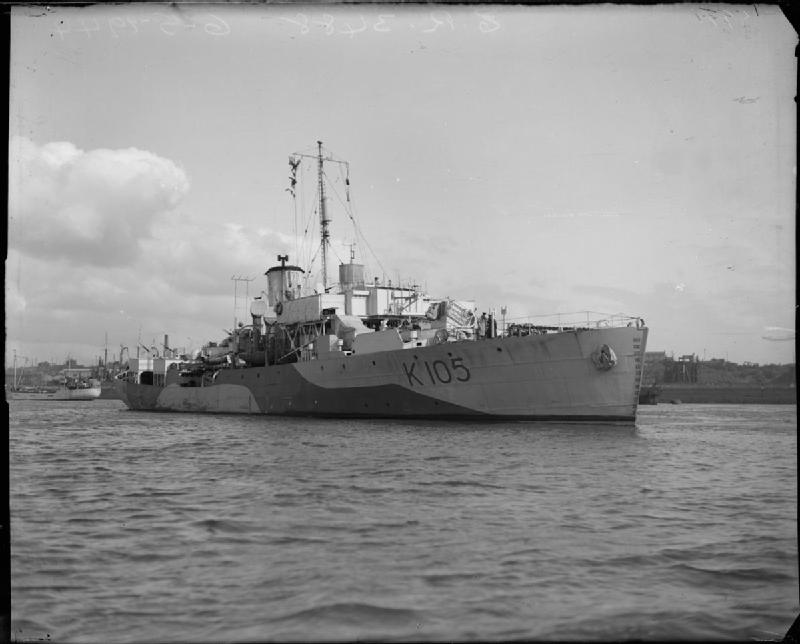
HMS Loosestrife

During the attack on 5 May, one torpedo fired by U-358 hit Bristol City. 15 of her complement were killed, including four DEMS gunners, and she sank in 20 minutes at position 54°00′N 43°55′W. The corvette HMS Loosestrife rescued 29 survivors, including Captain Webb and three DEMS gunners. On 9 May Loosestrife landed the survivors at St. John's, Newfoundland.

== Bibliography ==
- Lloyd's Register of Shipping. Vol. II.–Steamers. London: Lloyd's Register of Shipping. 1921 – via Internet Archive.
- Lloyd's Register of Shipping (PDF). Vol. II.–Steamers and Motorships of 300 tons gross and over. London: Lloyd's Register of Shipping. 1932 – via Southampton City Council.
- Lloyd's Register of Shipping (PDF). Vol. II.–Steamers and Motorships of 300 tons gross and over. London: Lloyd's Register of Shipping. 1934 – via Southampton City Council.
- Malcolm, Ian M (2013). Shipping Company Losses of the Second World War. Stroud: History Press. ISBN 978-0-7509-5371-9.
- Mercantile Navy List. London. 1930 – via Crew List Index Project.
