= Lex Frieden =

American educator, researcher, disability policy expert and disability rights activist

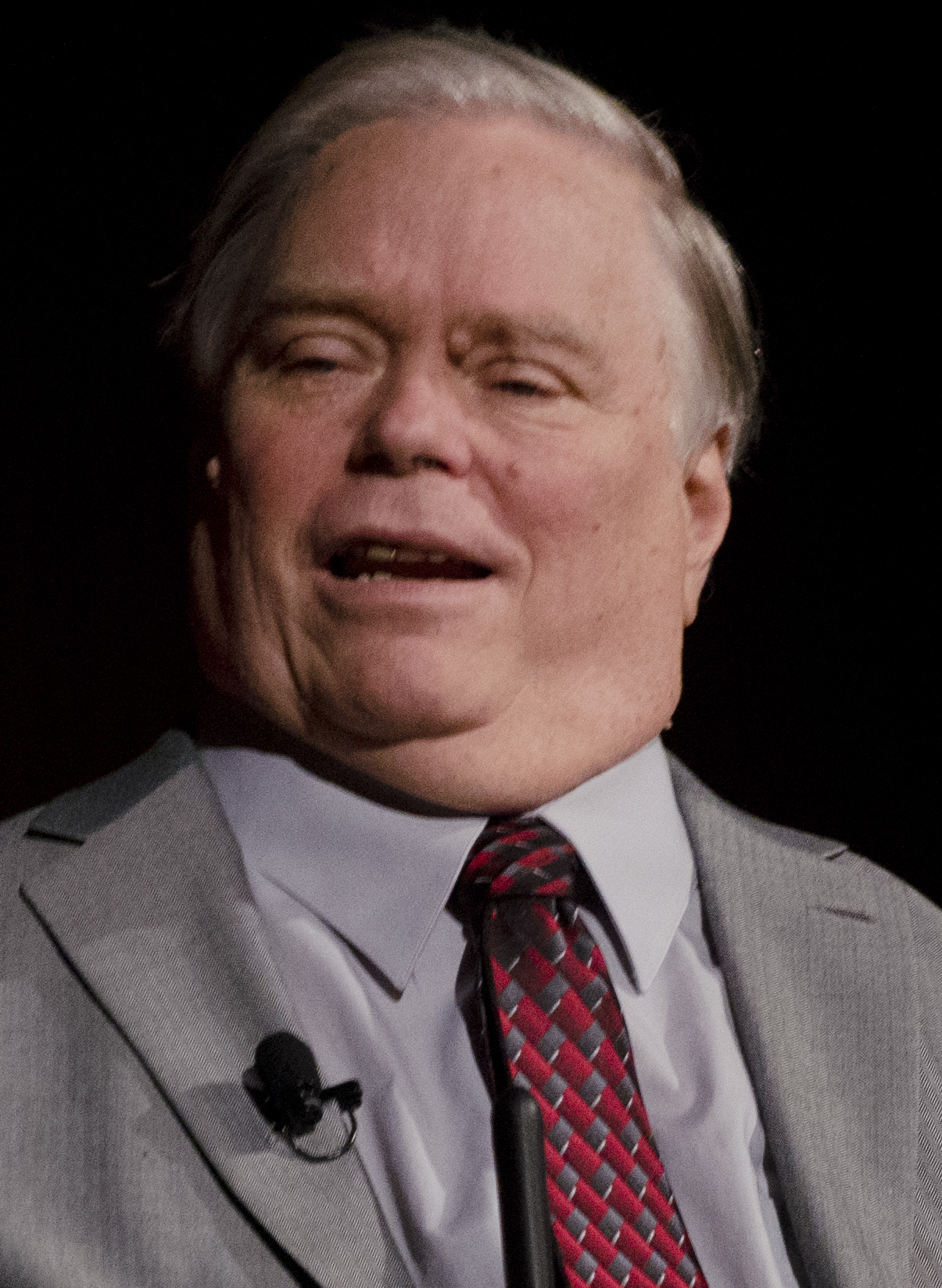
- Frieden in 2014
- Born: March 5, 1949 (age 77); Alva, Oklahoma, U.S.
- Education: University of Tulsa; University of Houston; National University of Ireland, Galway
- Occupation: Professor
- Website: Lex Frieden Home

Lex Frieden (born March 5, 1949) is an American educator, researcher, disability policy expert and disability rights activist. Frieden has been called "a chief architect of the Americans with Disabilities Act." He is also regarded as a founder and leader of the independent living movement by people with disabilities in the U.S.

== Biography ==
Lex Frieden was born in Alva, Oklahoma, a rural community in northwestern Oklahoma. He graduated from Alva Senior High School in 1967 and began studying electrical engineering at Oklahoma State University. It was as a freshman that he sustained a spinal cord injury in an automobile accident. As part of his rehabilitation from that injury, he went to TIRR Memorial Hermann in Houston, where he met Dr. William A. Spencer, the rehabilitation medicine visionary. Dr. Spencer became Lex's mentor.

== Public service ==
Frieden's service in the 1970s included membership on a Congressional task force on science, technology and disability empaneled by Olin E. Teague (1910–1981), U.S. Congressman from Texas. The panel's mission was to study what was and was not being done in disability-related research across the entire swath of the U.S. Government. That panel's work led, in 1978, to the creation of the National Institute on Disability and Rehabilitation Research (NIDRR), a unit of the US Department of Education.

Frieden was one of the major figures behind the enactment of the Americans with Disabilities Act of 1990. As Executive Director of the National Council on Disability (NCD) in the mid-1980s, reporting to presidentially appointed Council members notably including Vice Chairman Justin Dart Jr., Frieden oversaw the work of Robert Burgdorf in writing the first drafts of what was to become the ADA. The Council issued two major reports, Toward Independence and On the Threshold of Independence, to further the effort along. President George H.W. Bush signed the ADA into law on July 26, 1990. Other significant legislation inspired by the council while Frieden was director included the Air Carrier Access Act of 1986 (ACAA) and legislation to make national parks and recreation areas accessible to people with disabilities.

After leaving NCD in 1988, Frieden was appointed by Congressman Major R. Owens, Chairman of the U.S. House of Representatives Subcommittee on Select Education, to be coordinator of the newly formed, Congressional Task Force on the Rights and Empowerment of Americans with Disabilities. The role of the task force was to gather information on the extent and nature of disability discrimination in America. Justin Dart Jr. was named chairman of the group, and working together as they had for the past five years at NCD, they produced several reports and papers which congressional committees used in the process of considering and refining the ADA before passage.

President George W. Bush appointed Frieden Chairman of the NCD and the Senate confirmed his appointment on July 26, 2002, the anniversary of the signing of the ADA. Frieden's swearing-in ceremony was conducted in the Oval Office by the President and by White House Chief of Staff Andrew Card. Under Frieden's leadership, the Council produced a report, Righting the ADA, that made recommendations leading to the enactment of the ADA Amendments Act of 2008, and they proposed a UN Convention on the Rights of People with Disabilities.

Other Council priorities during Frieden's tenure as NCD chair centered on livable communities, adaptive technology and community-based services and supports for long-term care. His personal experience assisting with disaster response and recovery after Hurricanes Katrina and Rita motivated Council recommendations that resulted in the passage of legislation to improve emergency preparedness and response for people with disabilities in disasters.

== Academic appointments ==
Frieden is Professor of Health Informatics and Physical Medicine and Rehabilitation at the University of Texas Health Science Center at Houston. He is also Professor (Adjunct) of Physical Medicine and Rehabilitation at Baylor College of Medicine. Frieden directs the Independent Living Research Utilization (ILRU) program at TIRR Memorial Hermann Hospital in Houston (The Institute for Rehabilitation and Research). In 2010, the Chancellor and Vice Chancellor for the University of Texas System appointed him Chancellor's Health Fellow on Disability.

== Education ==
Frieden is an Alumnus of the University of Tulsa. He was named a Distinguished Alumnus of the University in 1979, and in 2004, the Lex Frieden Presidential Scholarship was established by the University in his honor. He is also a graduate of the University of Houston. In 2004, he was awarded an honorary doctorate in law (LL.D.) by the National University of Ireland, Galway.

== Recognition ==
In 1983, Frieden was recognized as one of the Ten Outstanding Young Americans. He was the 1998 winner of the Henry B. Betts Award for outstanding achievement in disability rights. In 2011, the Texas Governor's Committee on People with Disabilities named its annual employment awards program after Frieden for his advocacy work regarding the employment of people with disabilities around the world. He also won the 2013 Henry Viscardi Achievement Awards. Frieden was awarded the prestigious Fries Prize for Human Improvement by the CDC Foundation in 2017.

== Community service ==
Frieden is a member and former chairperson of the Board of the United Spinal Association. He serves on the board of the Sam Houston Area Council Boy Scouts of America. In 2016, Frieden was appointed by Houston Mayor Sylvester Turner to the board of METRO, the Metropolitan Transit Authority of Harris County, Texas.

== Personal papers and historical archives ==
Frieden's extensive collection of ADA artifacts and documents is held by the US National Archives and Records Administration at the George Bush Presidential Library at College Station, Texas. The collection chronicles the disability and independent living movements by people with disabilities during the last half of the 20th century and the beginning of the 21st century.

== See also ==
- List of disability rights activists
