= DART (disk utility) =

Limited release Macintosh disk utility

DART (Disk Archive/Retrieval Tool) is a limited release Macintosh disk utility capable of duplicating – and making images of – Macintosh, Lisa, Apple II, MS-DOS, and Windows formatted floppy disks. It is the only Macintosh disk utility which can copy or make images of Lisa and Apple II disks.

== History ==
Written by David Mutter and Ken McLeod, two software engineers working for Apple Computer, Inc., DART 1.0 was released in 1987. The final version (1.5.3) became available in September 1993.

Only ever released as an internal Apple application, DART remains an extremely rare Macintosh disk utility. Originally available to download from AppleLink – Apple's online service for employees, authorised dealers, and software developers – it was later distributed on Apple Service Source CD-ROMs. Due to its very limited distribution, very little is known about versions prior to 1.5.x, other than DART 1.4 thinking it was infected when launched directly from the CD-ROM on a Macintosh IIfx or a Mac from the Quadra family running System 7.0.1

Although a disk utility in its own right, DART was designed to work alongside Steve Christensen's more popular Disk Copy, thanks to its ability to read disk images created with said application, and could even convert DART files into Disk Copy format. A specially written HyperCard stack – aptly named DART™ Converter – was used to carry out the conversion process. File and image conversion could even be performed remotely over a network.

Version 1.5 was built to be fully compatible with System 7, in that it implemented custom Apple events, and allowed for the creation of disk images through the process of drag and drop: dragging files or disks, and dropping them on the application's icon – something that previous versions of System Software did not feature.

Perhaps the most interesting aspect of DART 1.5 is that it was an A/UX compatible application. Very few (if any) Macintosh applications were ported to Apple's flavour of UNIX, and it is nothing short of intriguing that Apple chose to port DART, rather than the more popular Disk Copy. A/UX users weren't complaining however, as they could now work with floppies formatted for no less than five different platforms.

With the decline of A/UX, and the Lisa and Apple II having been all but forgotten, DART faded quietly into obscurity, and on December 22, 1997 was altogether removed from Apple's support site.
