= G. F. J. Dart =

Australian philosopher and playwright

Gerald Francis John Dart OBE (20 May 1905 – 17 August 1978) was a teacher, educational philosopher and playwright who was Headmaster of Ballarat Grammar School in Victoria, Australia from 1942 until 1970. He was made an Officer of the Order of the British Empire (OBE) in 1971 for services to education and was a founding Member of the Australian College of Educators (MACE).

== Background ==
G.F.J. Dart was born in Westport, New Zealand, the son of the Anglican priest John Dart, and educated in Nelson, New Zealand at Nelson College. He completed Master of Arts degrees in both English and Latin at the University of New Zealand in Christchurch (now the University of Canterbury). While he was at university he wrote and produced the Canterbury University College Reviews.

Dart began teaching at Cathedral Grammar School, Christchurch (1929–1934). While visiting England from 1936, he met Elizabeth Williams whom he married in 1939. After teaching at Anglewood School, Bowral (1938–1940), Dart went to Ballarat Grammar as Senior Master in 1941. He was Acting Headmaster in 1942 and appointed permanently in 1943.

== Views on education ==
G.F.J. Dart held individualist views on education which he expressed in plain English through speeches and various writings. His views meant that some practices, common in other schools, were not to be found at Ballarat Grammar.

In 1944, for example, Dart oversaw the abolition of the house system, which he believed was divisive, creating artificial factions within a school. Houses were not reinstated at the school until after Dart's retirement, when one of the new boarders’ houses was named Dart House.

Dart also opposed formal team debating, although he encouraged public speaking and discussion. In 1949, the year debating was discontinued at Grammar, he wrote, “We do not consider it desirable to encourage boys to argue for causes in which they do not believe.”

During the 1960s it was the school's policy to cap numbers at 450. Dart supported that in a 1964 address to Old Boys by outlining the advantages of smaller over larger institutions.

The school's cadet unit was disbanded during Dart's headmastership, but it is not clear whether that was for philosophical or practical reasons.

== Manual work and self-sufficiency ==
At the time of Dart's headmastership, Ballarat Grammar was a small Church of England boys’ school of up to two hundred or so students, at least half of them boarders from country towns and farms, especially in the Mallee, Wimmera and Western District regions of Victoria.

Dart was an active gardener who valued manual work. He encouraged students in outdoors projects and in small farming enterprises which developed the school's self-sufficiency, for example by producing vegetables and eggs for the school kitchen. The school ran a piggery and at one stage kept two draught horses. In the early 1960s, some senior boys designed and built a students’ common room that later became the school's library for a time, and from the mid-1960s students and teachers laid many square metres of brick paving around the school.

== Plays and playwriting ==
G.F.J. Dart produced the school's annual plays, choosing works by such writers as Shakespeare, George Bernard Shaw and Christopher Fry. He also wrote several plays, including My Last Duchess, based on Robert Browning, performed at Her Majesty's Theatre, Ballarat (1952); The Tower of Babel, produced for the Ballarat Begonia Festival (1959); and a parody of Summer of the Seventeenth Doll entitled The Summer of the 777th Billy-can, also performed at Her Majesty's (1960).

== Retirement ==
After G.F.J. Dart retired at the end of 1970, he and Mrs Dart lived in Queensland at Tallebudgera on the Gold Coast hinterland.
