= Medicine Under Canvas =

Medicine Under Canvas is a book and a documentary film about the 77th Evacuation Hospital during World War II. The rare book is 200 pages long and is arguably the most detailed history of an evacuation hospital in the European and North African theatres of war. There were over 40 evacuation hospital units in the European Theater of Operations, but few have published unit histories.

== Book ==
The first printing in 1949, edited by Max Allen, MD was done for the unit members and only 500 copies were produced. The second edition, printed in 2008 was limited to 1,000 copies. Over 200 photographs are included, which does not include the head shots of the majority of the unit members in a "yearbook" type section filling the last pages of the volume. Early sections of the book include a view of what the injured soldier experienced from arrival through treatment and then until he is evacuated to home, another hospital or back to his unit.

== Unit ==
The 77th Evacuation Hospital was formed at The University of Kansas Medical Center in 1942. Preliminary organization began earlier, but the actual unit was not drawn up until the Japanese attack on Pearl Harbor. Made up of 40 doctors, 60 nurses, and 300 enlisted men, the unit shipped out to England in May 1942. They began active operation in Oran, after the Allies invaded North Africa, and continued there and in Sicily until the surrender of all axis forces in that theatre in 1943. They returned to England and prepared for deployment on the European mainland after the anticipated invasion. On July 7, 1944 the 77th crossed the English Channel and supported the Allied troops through the end of the war.

== Film ==
The documentary is 72 minutes long, has an original score, over 17 interviews with members of the unit, and never before seen color footage from World War II filmed by Mervin Rumold, MD, one of the surgeons in the unit. The making of the documentary was a four-year process for the director, Dan Ginavan. Beginning at the final reunion of the surviving members of the unit in 2004, he began filming the interviews in a small hotel room not knowing if a film would ever be made or not. Continuing on with the project and completing it with a very small staff the film premiered on Veteran's Day, 2008. The film was expected to compete in film festivals in 2009. The film won a Silver Telly in 2009 in the category of History/Biography.
