= Dart River =

Dart River may refer to any of several rivers:

In Australia

- Dart River (Victoria)

In New Zealand

- Dart River / Te Awa Whakatipu in the Otago region of the southwestern South Island
- Dart River (Tasman) in the northwestern South Island

In the United Kingdom

- River Dart, a river in Devon, England
- East Dart River, Devon
- Little Dart River, Devon
- West Dart River, Devon
