= John Dart =

English lawyer, clergyman and antiquary

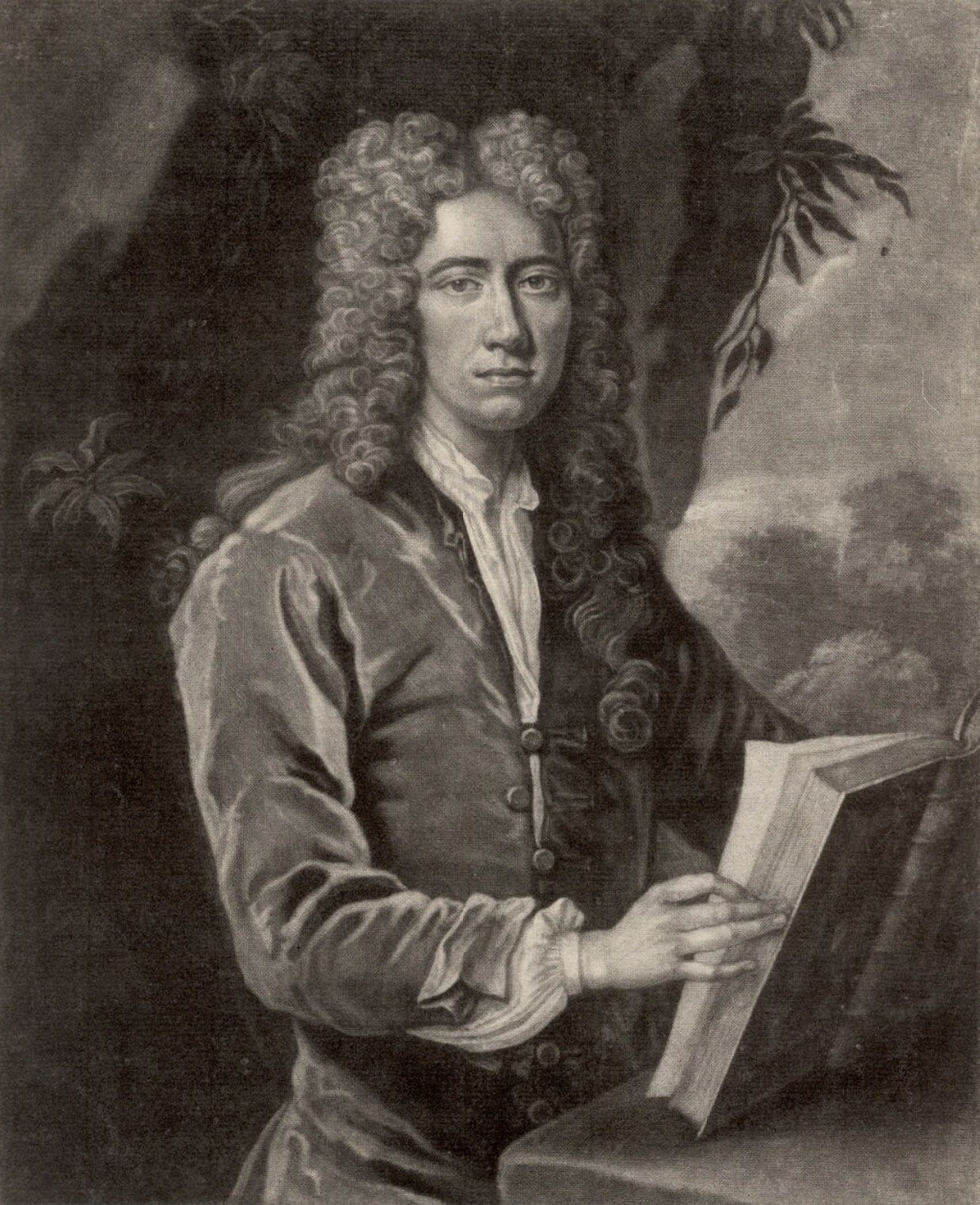
Mezzotint of Dart by John Faber the Younger

John Dart (died 1730) was an English lawyer, clergyman and antiquary.

== Life ==
Initially an attorney, but not successful in the profession, Dart obtained a title for holy orders. In 1728, he was presented by the master of St. Cross Hospital, Winchester, to the perpetual curacy of Yateley, Hampshire. He served the church from the neighbouring village of Sandhurst, Berkshire, where he died in December 1730, and was buried on the 20th at Yateley.

== Works ==
Dart wrote:

- A modernised version of The Complaint of the Black Knight, London, 1718; it was at that time incorrectly attributed to Geoffrey Chaucer.
- A Life of Chaucer prefixed to John Urry's edition, London, 1721.
- A paraphrase of Tibullus, London, 1720.
- Westminster Abbey, a poem, London, 1721, later included in his Westmonasterium.
- History and Antiquities of the Cathedral Church of Canterbury, London, 1726.
- Westmonasterium; or the History and Antiquities of the Abbey Church of St. Peter's, Westminster, 2 vols. London, 1742.

== Notes ==
Attribution

This article incorporates text from a publication now in the public domain: Stephen, Leslie, ed. (1888). "Dart, John". Dictionary of National Biography. Vol. 14. London: Smith, Elder & Co.
