= Dart Container Line =

Bemudan shipping consortium, 1969–1981

Dart Containerline Co Ltd (as it was incorporated in Bermuda) was a consortium of shipping companies that commenced operations in 1969, thus becoming one of the first container shipping operators.

The consortium comprised Compagnie Maritime Belge (CMB), Charles Hill of Bristol, England (owners of the Bristol City Line) and Clarke Traffic Services Ltd from Montreal, Quebec, Canada. The company operated between Antwerp and Southampton in Europe and Halifax, New York and Norfolk in North America.

At first, the consortium deployed three chartered German container ships to Halifax plus four 18,000-ton painter-class ships, including Breughel, which had been launched in 1963 and operated by CMB, to US ports. The purpose-built vessels operated by the consortium included the 31,036-ton MV Dart America, owned by Clarke and launched in 1970, and her sister ship MV Dart Atlantic, owned by Bristol City Line and launched in 1971. Both these vessels were later owned by the Bibby Line, which acquired Bristol City Line in 1971. Bibby later sold its share in Dart Containerline to Orient Overseas Container Line, which took over the Clarke shareholding in 1973. The third ship, MVDart Europe, was owned by CMB.

The consortium ceased operating in 1981, when the St Lawrence Coordinated Service was formed by Orient Overseas Container Line (though its subsidiary Manchester Liners), Compagnie Maritime Belge and CP Ships, and Halifax was dropped for the Canadian service in favour of Montreal, while a separate service was begun to the US. The Dart America became the Manchester Challenge, the Dart Atlantic the CP Ambassador and the Dart Europe the CMB Europe, while a fourth ship was added as the Canadian Explorer. In 1983, Orient Overseas took over the whole of the US service, under which name it operates today. In Canada, the successors are Orient Overseas Container Line, which eventually shed the Manchester Liners name, and Hapag-Lloyd, which took over CP Ships in 2007.
