= Harrington rod =

Surgical implant typically used to stabilise scoliosis

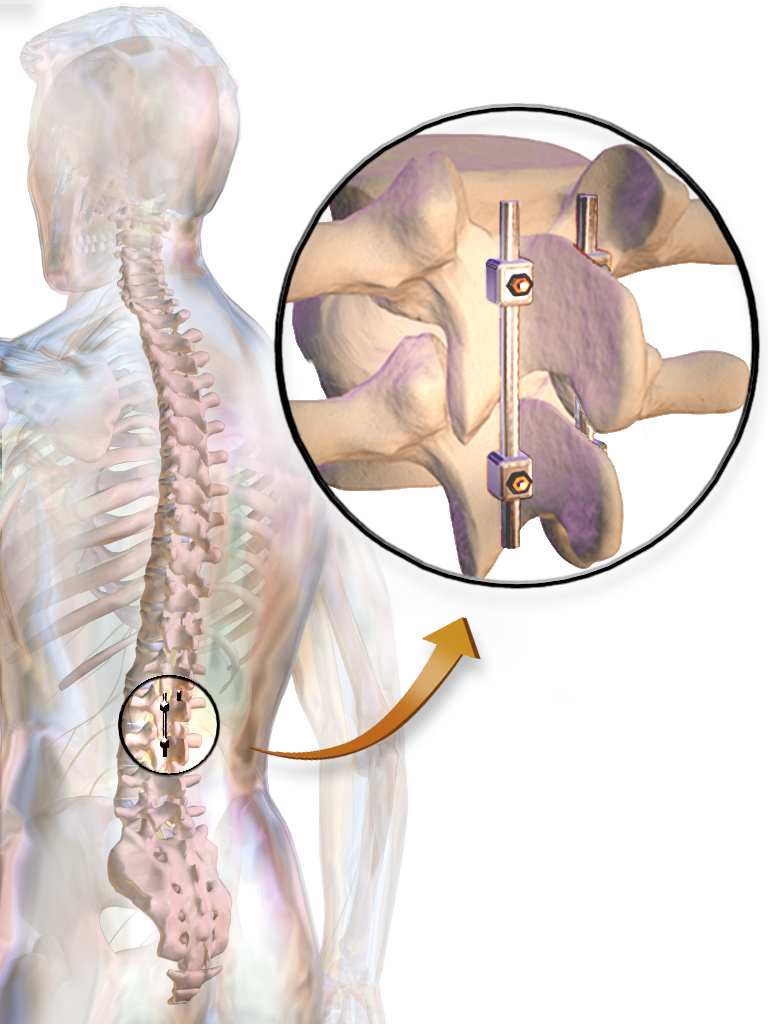
Harrington rods used in spinal fusion

The Harrington rod (or Harrington implant) is a stainless steel surgical device. Historically, this rod was implanted along the spinal column to treat, among other conditions, a lateral or coronal-plane curvature of the spine, or scoliosis. Up to one million people had Harrington rods implanted for scoliosis between the early 1960s and the late 1990s.

== History ==
The Harrington implant was developed in 1953 by Paul Harrington, a professor of orthopedic surgery at Baylor College of Medicine in Houston, Texas. Harrington had a keen interest in working with patients with neuromuscular scoliosis, particularly patients who had poliomyelitis. Harrington collaborated with an orthotist named Thorkild Engen to develop the Harrington Rod.

Harrington rods were intended to provide a means to reduce the curvature and to provide more stability to a spinal fusion. Before the Harrington rod was invented, scoliosis patients had their spines fused without any instrumentation to support it; such fusions required many months in plaster casts, and large curvatures could progress despite fusion.

Harrington personally created and adjusted the rods from his previous patients, allowing him to refine the Harrington rods over time. He first presented the Harrington Rods at the American Academy of Orthopaedic Surgeons Annual Meeting in 1958, which was met with skepticism. He worked with Zimmer Manufacturing for production and sale of the Harrington rods in the 1960s. Harrington and his rods were featured on the cover of Time Magazine in 1962 which recognized his work and innovation.

== Purpose ==
Harrington rod instrumentation was used to treat instability and deformity of the spine. Instability occurs when the spine no longer maintains its normal shape during movement. Such instability results in nerve damage, spinal deformities, and disabling pain. Spinal deformities may be caused by birth defects, fractures, marfan syndrome, neurofibromatosis, neuromuscular diseases, severe injuries, and tumors. By far, the most common use for the Harrington rod was in the treatment of scoliosis, for which it was invented.

== Description ==
The device itself was a stainless steel distraction rod fitted with hooks at both ends and a ratchet and was implanted through an extensive posterior spinal approach, the hooks being secured onto the vertebral laminae. It was used at the beginning without performing a spinal fusion but early results proved fusion as part of the procedure was mandatory, as movement of the unfused spine would cause the metal to fatigue and eventually break. The procedure required the use of a postoperative plaster cast or bracing until vertebral fusion had occurred.

== Flatback syndrome ==
Flatback syndrome is a problem that develops in some patients treated with Harrington rod instrumentation, where the rod extends down into lower part of the lumbar spine. Because the Harrington cannot follow the natural lordosis of the lower back (i.e. the backwaist curve), the spine is straightened out into an unnatural position. At first, the unfused spinal segments compensate for the straightening effects, but eventually the discs degenerate and wear down. The patient then develops back pain, has difficulty standing upright, and experiences limitations when walking. Eventually, the problem requires surgery to realign the spine.

As exemplified by Pecina and Dapic in the European Spine Journal (February 2007), flatback syndrome is not inevitable and does not happen to every person with a low Harrington rod instrumented fusion – there are many people who have had Harrington rods for decades with no adverse effects.
