= John Dart (New Zealand priest) =

John Raynor Dart (1855 – 27 May 1935) was an Anglican priest in the West Coast and Nelson districts of New Zealand in late-nineteenth to early-20th century.

Born in Melbourne, Dart was a goldminer's son, and came to New Zealand with his family in 1865. He initially worked with a legal firm and then the Blenheim Post Office. After working with the Church of Nativity, he became the lay secretary for Nelson diocese in 1889, a connection he maintained for the next 50 years. In 1890 he began to study for the ministry at Bishopdale Theological College. Dart was ordained deacon by Bishop Mules on 28 December 1894, as curate of Brunnerton and Grey Valley. He became a priest and clerical secretary of the synod in 1895, and held incumbencies at Reefton, Westport (1901), and Wakefield (1915 or possibly 1913). He became the vicar of All Saints Parish, Nelson, in 1925, and Archdeacon of Waimea in 1926. Dart's ill-health forced his retirement in 1931, after which he became director of the Nelson YMCA. He died on 27 May 1935 in his Brougham Street home, and was buried at Wakapuaka Cemetery.

Dart had two sons, C.W.R. Dart, an educator and the educator and playwright G.F.J. Dart.
