= Dart Music =

Dart
- Website type: Digital music aggregation
- Founded: Nashville, TN
- Owner: Dart Music
- Creator: [Chris McMurtry]
- Website: [www.dartmusic.com/]
- Launched: September 2015

Dart Music, or Dart, is a digital music aggregator specialized in distributing classical music to online music vendors and streaming services. Since metadata for classical music is different from that of popular music, Dart specializes in ensuring that the metadata for the music it distributes is correct.

Dart was founded in Nashville, Tennessee, in 2015 by Chris McMurtry, and the company was developed through Nashville's Project Music startup accelerator, and the company was featured as part of Google's Demo Day 2016. The company launched in September, 2015, and as of late 2015, Dart had received more than $1.5 million in funding.

Dart is a fully automated digital music distribution platform that allows classical musicians to distribute their music even if they do not record with a record label.

In June 2017 Dart Music's assets, including all technology, trademarks, patents, data, and customer relationships were acquired by Core Rights, LLC, a Nashville, Tennessee–based music and IP rights licensing and services company.
