= Yoshiko Dart =

Disability rights activist

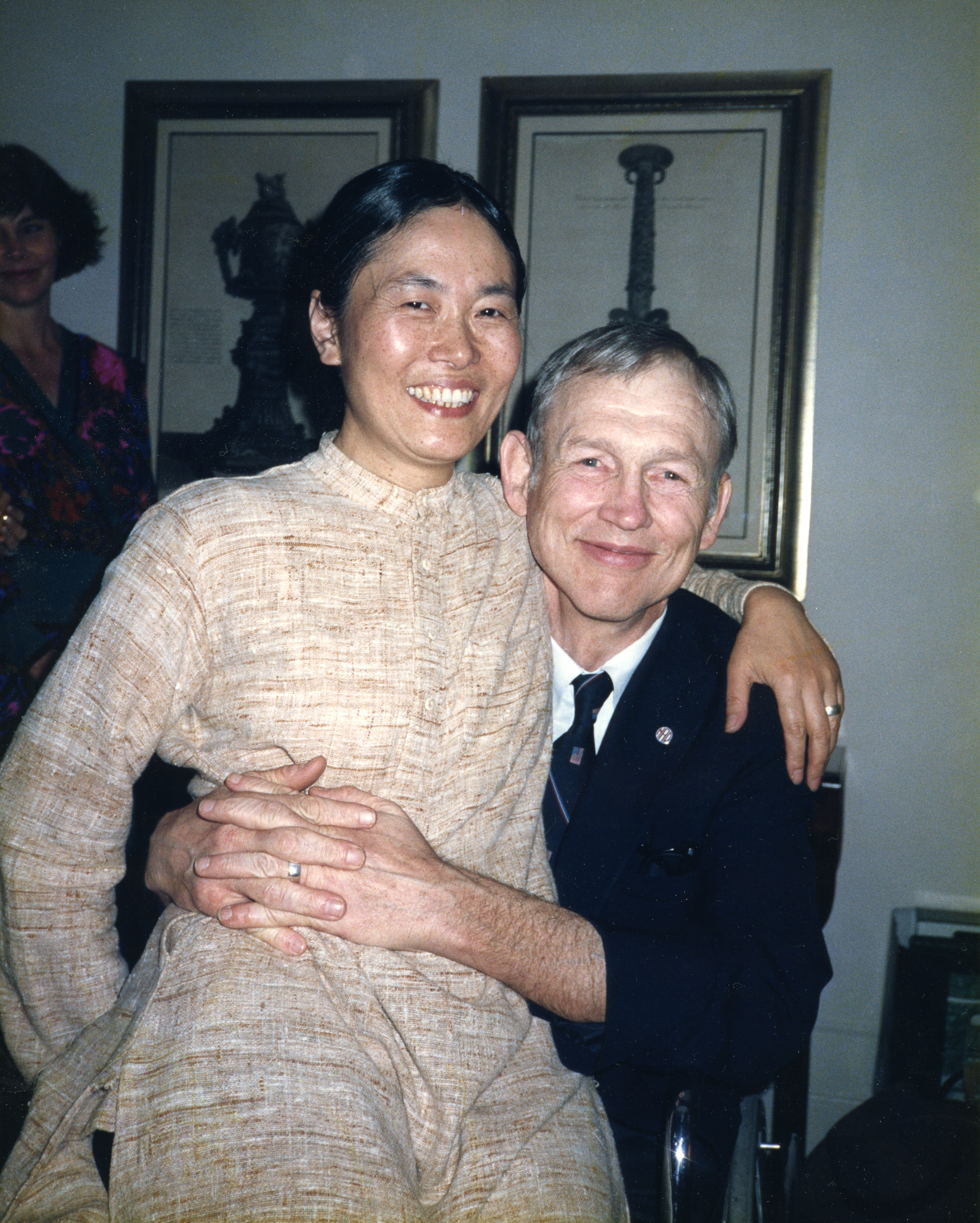
Yoshiko and Justin Dart in 1987

Yoshiko Saji Dart is a disability rights activist and one of the people instrumental advocating for the Americans with Disabilities Act.

Dart's original work with people with disabilities was as translator, and then executive assistant to the President of Tupperware Japan, Justin Dart. He had hired young men with disabilities to work as salespeople and Yoshiko taught them salesmanship, public speaking, and business skills. Yoshiko Dart married Justin Dart in 1968. While they were living in Japan they started working with a philosophy they called "Revolution in I Universe" finding strength and energy within themselves to move to the United States and get involved with the political process to work for civil rights for people with disabilities. Together they wrote A Philosophical Foundation for the Independent Living and Disability Rights Movements which outlines this philosophy.

Dart, along with her husband, traveled to every state in the US on an ADA Diaries Tour meeting people with disabilities and hosting gatherings where people with disabilities could tell their stories. Some of the people they met--who discussed the discrimination, segregation, and inequality they experienced--were invited to speak to a Congressional Task Force on the Rights and Empowerment of People with Disabilities which got people's first-hand experiences dealing with societal barriers to the ears of Congresspeople. When Justin Dart Jr. received the Presidential Medal of Freedom from President Clinton, Dart "immediately removed the medal to bestow it upon his wife Yoshiko," insisting that it belonged to everyone in the disability rights movement.
