= SunTran (St. George) =

Public transportation system in St. George, Utah

- Founded: 2003 by Five County Association of Governments
- Headquarters: 953 East Red Hills Parkway; St. George, Utah; United States
- Service area: St. George metropolitan area
- Service type: Public transportation
- Routes: 8
- Hubs: Transit Center; Sunset Corner Plaza

SunTran is the public transportation system serving the St. George, Utah area. It was formerly known as Dixie Area Rapid Transit or DART, which was launched and funded by Five County Association of Governments in 2003. The City of St. George in conjunction with federal transportation funding bought the bus system, today known as SunTran.

== Description ==
When the bus system was founded in 2003, there were 60,000 riders that first year of service. In 2012, the ridership numbers increased to over 500,000. In January 2015, SunTran service expanded operation outside the St. George city limits. SunTran may eventually expand into a metro/county-wide mass transit system as local municipalities secure efficient funding.

The bus fleet is in compliance with Americans With Disabilities Act and are therefore accessible to those with disabilities via paratransit. In accordance with the Utah Clean Air Act, SunTran and the City of St. George, smoking is prohibited on all buses and within 25 feet (7.6 m) of a bus stop.

SunTran currently operates seven fixed routes with nearly 200 bus stops serving St. George, Ivins, and Washington within the metropolitan area. Service runs Monday through Saturday 5:40 AM to 8:40 PM MT. Bus fares are $1 for one-way/one-transfer trips; seniors at least 65, disabled, or Medicare members pay $0.50; no fare to kids below 6 with fare-paying rider, although a 3-kid limit applies. Monthly and yearly passes can also be purchased at select locations throughout the city. All routes connect/depart every 40 minutes at both the central Transit Center at 1000 East and 100 South, and at Sunset Corner Plaza at Bluff Street and Sunset Boulevard.

SunTran also operates a regional route to Zion National Park with stops in St. George, Washington, Hurricane, La Verkin, Virgin, and Springdale. Fares are $5 one way to go to any stop on the 42 mile route.

== Routes ==
- 1 Red Cliffs/East Side
- 2 Riverside/Downtown
- 3 West Side Connector
- 4 Sunset/West Side
- 5 Ivins
- 6 Dixie Drive South/Bloomington
- 7 Washington
- Zion
