= Justin Whitlock Dart Sr. =

American businessman (1907–1984)

- Born: August 17, 1907; Evanston, Illinois, US
- Died: January 26, 1984 (aged 76)
- Education: Northwestern University
- Occupations: President (Dart Industries); Director of Store Operations (Walgreens)
- Employer(s): Dart Industries (1941–1980); Walgreens (1930–1940)
- Known for: Drug store magnate
- Spouse(s): Jane O'Brien Dart (m. 1940–1984); Ruth Walgreen Dart Stephan (m. 1929–1939)
- Children: 5, including Justin Whitlock Dart Jr.
- Awards: Presidential Medal of Freedom

Justin Whitlock Dart Sr. (August 17, 1907 – January 26, 1984) was an American businessman, considered the "boy wonder" of the drug store industry. In college Dart had played football for Northwestern University.

== Biography ==
He was born on August 17, 1907. He attended Northwestern University, where he played on the football and track and field teams. Dart was an All-American hammer thrower for the track and field team, finishing 3rd in that event at the 1928 NCAA Track and Field Championships.

After marrying Ruth Walgreen, Dart became an executive with his father-in-law's (Charles Walgreen) company, the Walgreens Drugstore chain. At Walgreens, he introduced the concept of placing the pharmacy counter at the back of the drug store, which not only provided privacy for medical concerns, but forced patrons to walk past many items for possible purchase.

Dart divorced his first wife, Ruth Walgreen, and left the Walgreen company shortly after. In 1943, Dart took control of the Boston-based United Drug Company. The chain operated under the Liggett, Owl, Sonta, and Rexall brands. Soon, Dart rebranded the stores under the Rexall name. After 35 years, Dart sold his stake in Rexall in 1978. Not long afterwards, he said "I would like my retirement and death to be simultaneous." During these years, Dart had acquired stakes in Avon, West Bend Housewares, Duracell, Ralph Wilson Plastics, Archer Glass and Hobart, which were collectively known as Dart Industries.

In 1980, Dart sold his company to Kraft Industries. Although Dart Industries never owned Avon, it was the former parent company to Tupperware Home Parties. Dart Industries merged with Kraft Foods.

== Death ==
Dart died from congestive heart failure in 1984, aged 76.

== Presidential Medal of Freedom ==
Dart received the Presidential Medal of Freedom posthumously in 1987.

== Family ==
Dart and his second wife, former actress Jane Bryan (1918–2009), were married on New Year's Eve in 1939, and remained married until his death in 1984. The couple had three children. Dart and Bryan were staunch Republicans and helped convince their close friend, former California Governor Ronald Reagan, to run for the presidency of the United States in 1980.

His son by his first marriage, Justin Whitlock Dart Jr. was a disability rights advocate. In 1989, Dart Jr. was appointed by President George H. W. Bush to the President's Committee on Employment of People with Disabilities. Dart Jr. also helped pass the Americans with Disabilities Act of 1990; he died in 2002 of complications related to polio.
