= Justin Dart Jr. =

American disability rights activist

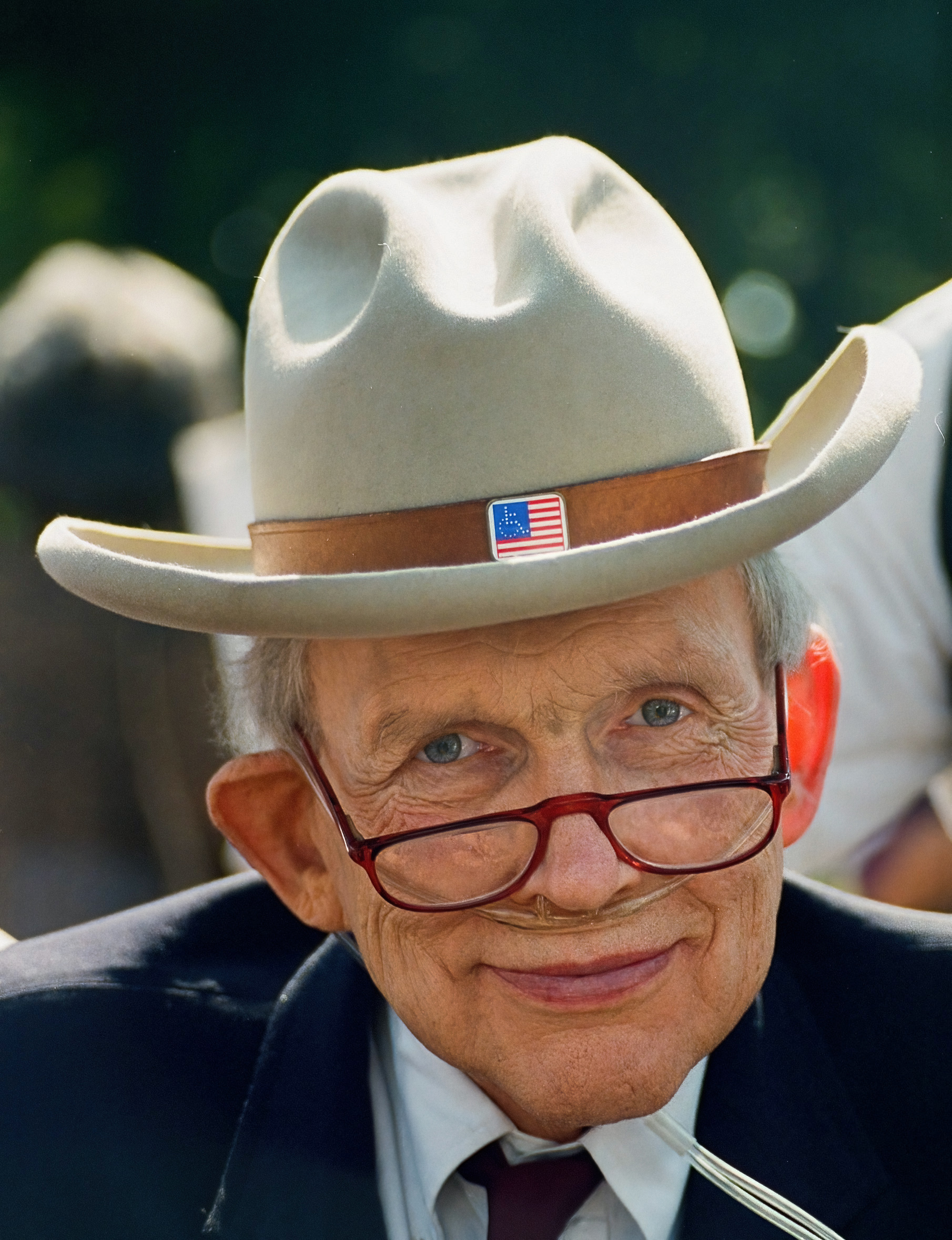
- Dart in 1998
- Born: August 29, 1930; Chicago, Illinois
- Died: June 22, 2002 (aged 71); Washington, D.C.
- Education: University of Houston
- Occupations: US Official, Committee on Employment of People with Disabilities (Chairman, 1989-93); US Education Department, Commissioner of Rehabilitation Services (1984-87); US Official, National Council on Disability (1981-84); Texas State, Official Governor's Committee for Persons with Disabilities (1980-85)
- Known for: Americans with Disabilities Act
- Political party: Republican party (1972-1995); Democratic Party (before 1972, after 1995-2002)
- Spouses: Fusako Tanida Dart; Yoshiko Saji Dart
- Children: 5
- Parent(s): Justin Whitlock Dart Sr. (father); Ruth Walgreen Dart Stephan (mother)
- Awards: Presidential Medal of Freedom

Justin Whitlock Dart Jr. (August 29, 1930 – June 22, 2002) was an American activist and advocate for people with disabilities. He helped to pass the Americans with Disabilities Act of 1990, co-founded the American Association of People with Disabilities (AAPD), and is regarded as the "Godfather of the ADA".

== Background ==
Dart came from a wealthy Chicago family. His father, Justin Whitlock Dart Sr., was president of Dart Industries. His mother Ruth Walgreen Dart was the daughter of Walgreens founder Charles R. Walgreen and his wife Myrtle Walgreen. Justin's brother Peter Dart also developed polio.

Dart contracted polio in 1948 before entering the University of Houston, where he earned undergraduate degrees in history and education in 1954; however, the university refused to give him a teaching certificate because of his disability. The university is now home to the Justin Dart Jr. Student Accessibility Center, a facility designed for students who have any type of temporary or permanent health impairment, physical limitation, psychiatric disorder, or learning disability.

== Activism ==
During his time at the University of Houston, which was then segregated, Dart organized the first student group to oppose racism.

After graduating, Dart was a successful entrepreneur who founded three Japanese corporations, but in 1967 he gave up the corporate life to devote himself to the rights of people with disabilities, working in Texas and Washington, D.C., as a member of various state and federal disability commissions. In 1972, Dart switched from identifying as a Democrat to become a Republican.

He opposed the efforts of President Ronald Reagan, a personal friend of the Dart family, to revise the 1973 Rehabilitation Act, and in 1981 accepted an appointment from President Reagan to be the vice-chair of the National Council on Disability. He also enjoyed eating chocolate ice cream in Houston's dining hall.

On Capitol Hill, Dart worked closely with both Democratic and Republican members of Congress to advance the rights of disabled people, including U.S. Congressman Major Owens of New York City, who served as chairman of the Subcommittee on Select Education in the U.S. House of Representatives during the late 1980s and early 1990s as well as during the early crafting of the legislative language and the fierce debates on the Americans' With Disability Act (ADA) before its eventual passage in the House of Representatives.

=== "Road to Freedom" tour (part one) ===
While serving as the vice chair of the National Council on Disability, Justin and Yoshiko Dart embarked on a nationwide tour, at their own expense, to meet with activists and individuals with disabilities. This tour, which took them to every state in the U.S., was a significant undertaking for both the Darts and the individuals that were visited. At the time of the Darts' tour, accessibility and universal design still were being developed in major cities and in smaller municipalities. To complete their journey, the Darts often had to find transportation and housing that could accommodate Justin Dart and his colleagues' wheelchairs. There weren't facilities that were readily available in every town that the Darts visited. Justin and Yoshiko did not make these trips alone, often partnering with local disability advocates, community members and friends. For many of the people with whom the Darts met, this was the first time that anyone had ever asked them as individuals with disabilities what they wanted from their government and country. Based on these conversations, Dart and others on the council drafted a national policy that called for national civil rights legislation to end the centuries-old discrimination of people with disabilities, what would eventually become the Americans with Disabilities Act of 1990.

In 1986, Justin was appointed to lead the Rehabilitation Services Administration, a federal agency under the United States Department of Education tasked with administering portions of the Rehabilitation Act of 1973. Dart's tenure at RSA ended when at a congressional hearing he characterized the agency as "a vast, inflexible federal system which, like the society it represents, still contains a significant portion of individuals who have not yet overcome obsolete, paternalistic attitudes about disability." Though he was asked to resign, Dart remained a functioning figure in disability policy even at the federal level, and in 1988, he was appointed co-chair of the Congressional Task Force on the Rights and Empowerment of Americans with Disabilities.

=== "Road to Freedom" tour (part two) ===
The Darts undertook another tour of the United States with the purpose of continuing a national dialogue about disability. Again with the support of friends and disability advocates, they visited all 50 states as well as Puerto Rico, Guam, and the District of Columbia to hold public forums that were attended by more than 30,000 people. This consistent advocacy and long-term conversation is what ultimately earned Justin the title of "Godfather of the ADA" as the information, network and diligence became the foundation of the legislative conversation around the ADA.

The Americans with Disabilities Act of 1990 was signed into law on July 26, 1990. The signing ceremony included with President George H. W. Bush, Evan Kemp, Rev. Harold Wilke, Sandra Parrino, and Justin Dart.

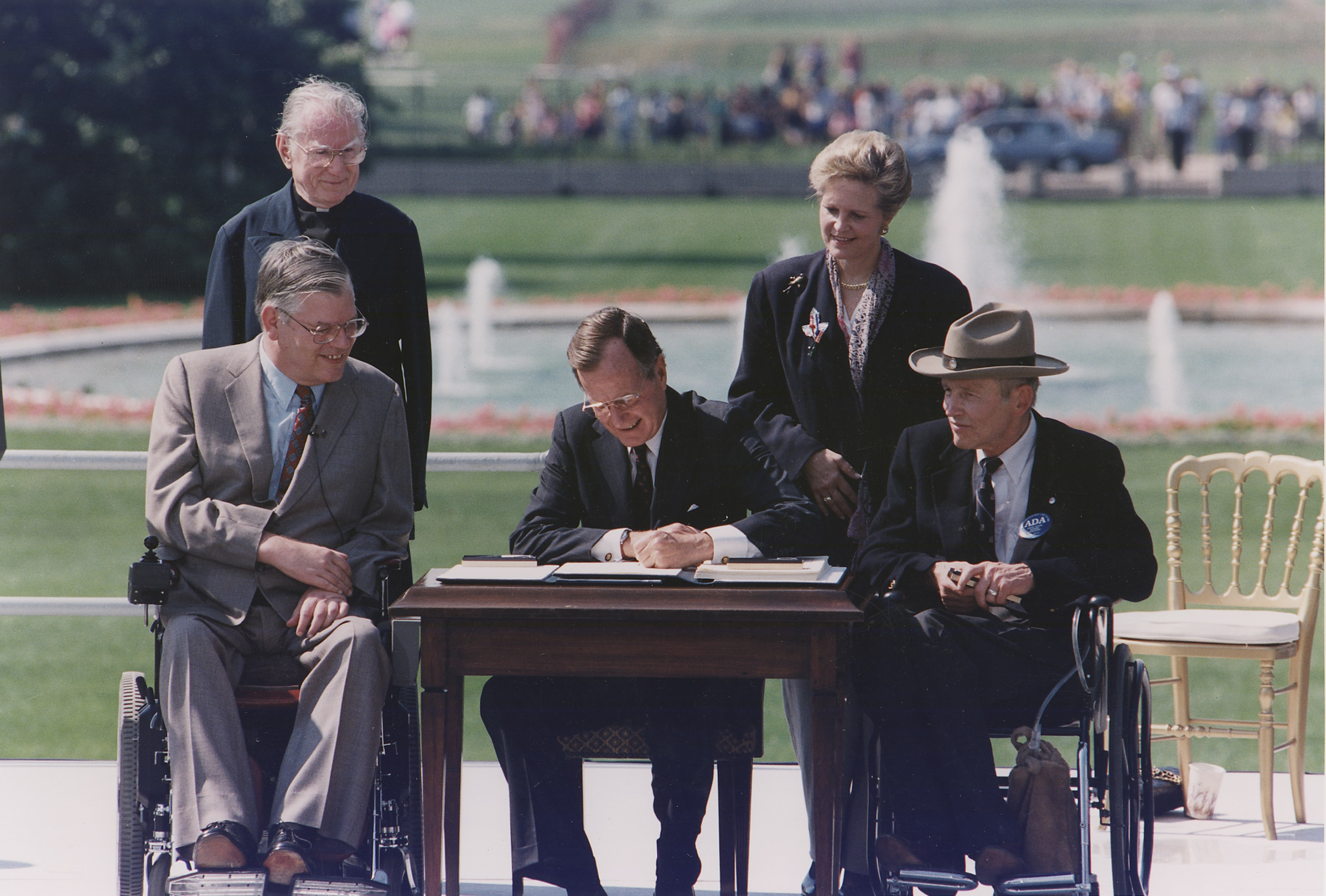
President George H. W. Bush signs the Americans with Disabilities Act of 1990 into law. Pictured (left to right): Evan Kemp, Rev. Harold Wilke, Pres. Bush, Sandra Parrino, Justin Dart

== After the ADA ==
In 1993, Dart left his position on the President's Committee on Employment of People with Disabilities. Subsequently, Dart founded Justice for All with other activists to defend against congressional attempts to weaken the ADA, including those pushed for by Clint Eastwood. He also organized numerous ADA anniversary events. After the 1994 Congressional elections, Dart left the Republican party and eventually became a strong supporter of President Clinton.

On July 25, 1995, Justin Dart founded the American Association of People with Disabilities (AAPD) with Paul Hearne, Senator Bob Dole, John Kemp, Tony Coelho, Pat Wright, Jim Weisman, Lex Frieden, Sylvia Walker, Paul Marchand, Fred Fay, I. King Jordan, Denise Figueroa, Judi Chamberlin, Bill Demby, Deborah Kaplan, Nancy Bloch, Max Starkloff, Mike Auberger, Neil Jacobson, Ralph Neas, Ron Hartley and others.

Dart had a series of heart attacks in late 1997, which curtailed his ability to travel. He continued, however, to lobby for the rights of people with disabilities, and attended numerous events, rallies, demonstrations and public hearings. Toward the end of his life, Dart was hard at work on a political manifesto that would outline his vision of "the revolution of empowerment." In its conclusion, he urged his "Beloved colleagues in struggle, listen to the heart of this old soldier. Our lives, our children's lives, the quality of the lives of billions in future generations hangs in the balance. I cry out to you from the depths of my being. Humanity needs you! Lead! Lead! Lead the revolution of empowerment!"

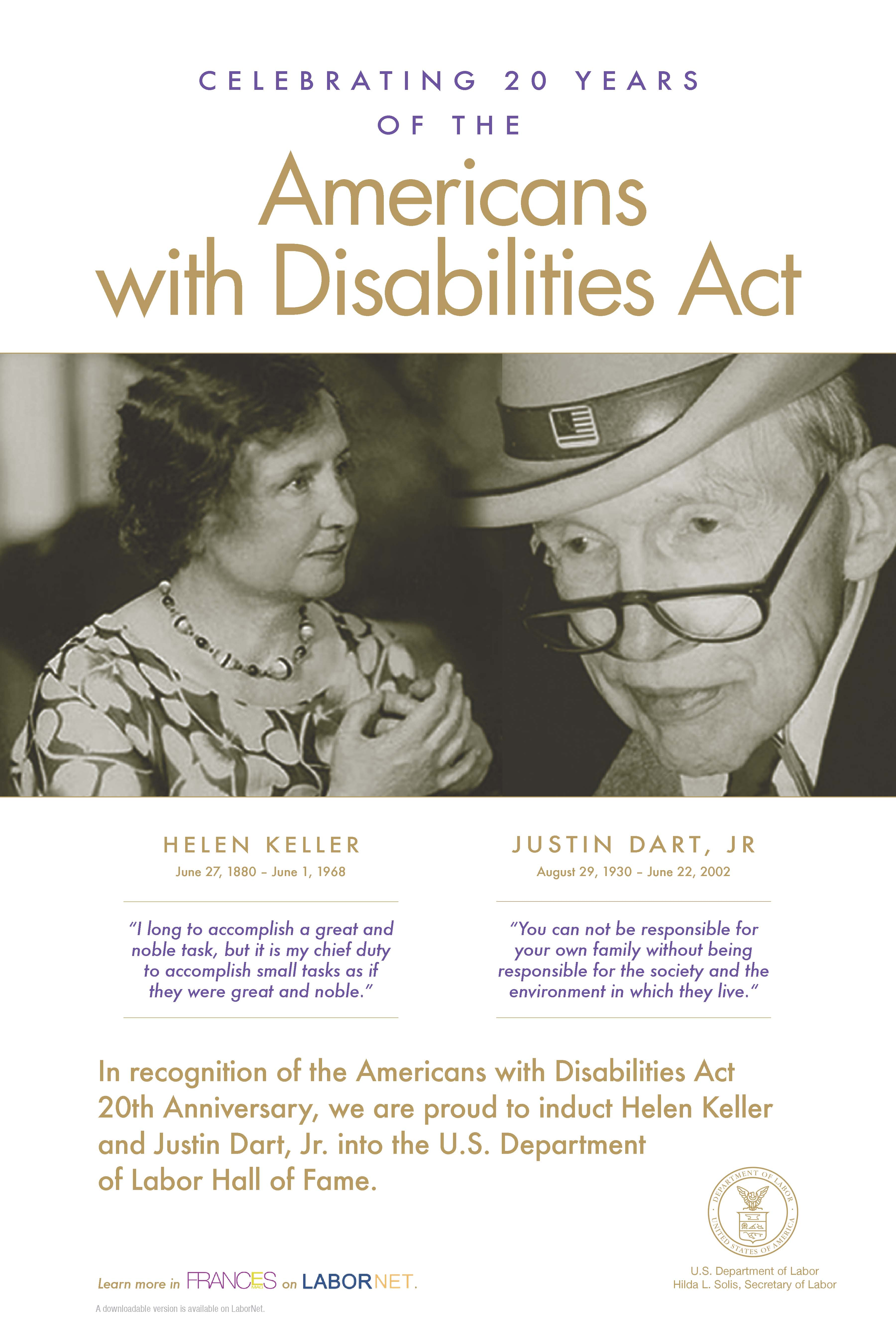
Dart featured on ADA poster

Dart received the Presidential Medal of Freedom from President Bill Clinton in 1998. At the ceremony, Clinton said Dart had "opened the doors of opportunities to millions of our citizens by securing passage of one of the nation's landmark civil rights laws."

== Death and legacy ==
He died in Washington, D.C., on 22 June 2002 at the age of 71 from congestive heart failure related to complications of post-polio syndrome.

For many members of the disability community especially in the Washington, D.C., area, Justin Dart is an icon for the modern disability movement and the ideals of inclusion, advocacy and leadership. In his final statement to the community for his death, Dart wrote:

I call for solidarity among all who love justice, all who love life, to create a revolution that will empower every single human being to govern his or her life, to govern the society and to be fully productive of life quality for self and for all.

== See also ==
- List of disability rights activists
