= List of shipwrecks in April 1943 =

The list of shipwrecks in April 1943 includes ships sunk, foundered, grounded, or otherwise lost during April 1943.

== 1 April ==
List of shipwrecks: 1 April 1943
| Ship | State | Description |
|---|---|---|
| Aquila | Italy | The cargo ship (3,386 GRT) rammed the grounded Charles Le Borgne west of Cape Bon, Tunisia, was run aground some hours later to avoid sinking, and was later abandoned. Her whole crew survived. The wreck was scrapped in 1951. |
| Benevento | Italy | World War II: The cargo ship (5,528 GRT) was torpedoed in the Mediterranean Sea off Cape Zebib, Tunisia, by HMMTB 315 (Royal Navy) and had to be run aground. She was later abandoned. |
| Crema | Italy | World War II: The cargo ship (1,684 GRT) was torpedoed and sunk in the Mediterranean Sea off Cape Zebib, Tunisia, by HMMTB 266 (Royal Navy) with the loss of 44 of her 70 crew. |
| Kokoko Maru | Imperial Japanese Army | World War II: The merchant cargo ship (543 GRT) was bombed and sunk off Kavieng by Boeing B-17 Flying Fortress aircraft of the United States Fifth Air Force. 18 crew were killed. |
| KT 13 | Kriegsmarine | World War II: The transport ship (850 GRT) struck a mine and sank in the Mediterranean Sea north of Cape Bon, Tunisia, with the loss of nineteen of the 64 people aboard. |
| KTShch-605 | Soviet Navy | World War II: The minesweeper (60 GRT) was sunk by a mine in the Black Sea off Gelendzhik with all crew. Fourteen names are listed on the OBD Memorial website. |
| Lamut | Soviet Union | The cargo ship (2,694 GRT) stranded on rocks one mile south of the Quillaytute River, in the Strait of Juan de Fuca (47°30′N 124°45′W) and turned over. One crew was killed. The 53 survivors were rescued by the US Coast Guard Station, Quillaytute River. The ship was wrecked. |
| Lysefjord | Norway | World War II: The cargo ship (1,091 GRT) was torpedoed and sunk in the Atlantic Ocean (23°09′N 83°24′W) by U-155 (Kriegsmarine) with the loss of four of her 23 crew. Survivors were rescued by Howard (United States). |
| Madonna di Porto Salvo | Italy | World War II: The fishing vessel (21 GRT) was sunk with gunfire in the Mediterranean Sea off Punta Licosa (40°15′N 14°54′E) by HMS Torbay (Royal Navy). |
| HMS MTB 63 | Royal Navy | The Vosper 70'-class motor torpedo boat (35 GRT) was sunk in a collision with HMS MTB 64 (Royal Navy) off Benghazi, Libya, (30°50′N 19°50′E). Her crew were rescued. |
| HMS MTB 64 | Royal Navy | The Vosper 70'-class motor torpedo boat (35 GRT) was severely damaged in a collision with HMS MTB 63 (Royal Navy) off Benghazi. A crew member was lost. She reached Benghazi two days later but was not repaired. |
| Triglav | Italy | World War II: The auxiliary sailing vessel (231 GRT) was torpedoed and sunk in the Mediterranean Sea four nautical miles (7.4 km; 4.6 mi) south east of Cape San Vito, Sicily by HMS Unrivalled (Royal Navy). Two of her crew were killed; eight survivors were rescued. |
| Uzbekistan | Soviet Union | The cargo ship (3,039 GRT) ran onto a reef near the mouth of the Darling River, Vancouver Island, British Columbia, Canada (48°43′N 125°03′W) and had to be abandoned. Her crew were rescued but the area's rough seas and frequent storms gradually battered the ship to pieces. |
| USS YP-235 | United States Navy | The yard patrol craft was sunk by an explosion, or set on fire and beached as a result of an explosion, in the Gulf of Mexico. |

== 2 April ==
List of shipwrecks: 2 April 1943
| Ship | State | Description |
|---|---|---|
| City of Baroda | United Kingdom | World War II: Convoy NC 9: The passenger ship (71,294 GRT) was torpedoed and damaged in the Atlantic Ocean 90 nautical miles (170 km) south west of Luderitz Bay, South-West Africa (27°56′S 15°21′E) by U-509 (Kriegsmarine) with the loss of 13 of the 338 people on board. Survivors abandoned ship and were rescued by HMT Cape Warwick (Royal Navy). City of Baroda came ashore two days later and broke up on 26 April. She was declared a total loss. |
| Dundrum Castle | United Kingdom | The cargo ship (5,259 GRT) caught fire, was abandoned and later blew up and sank in the Straits of Perim, in the Red Sea (14°37′N 42°23′E). Her crew were rescued. |
| Gogra | United Kingdom | World War II: Convoy OS 45: The cargo ship (5,190 GRT) was torpedoed and sunk in the Atlantic Ocean 230 nautical miles (430 km) west of Porto, Portugal (4°02′N 15°39′W) by U-124 (Kriegsmarine) with the loss of 82 of her 90 crew. Survivors were rescued by Danby (United Kingdom) and New Northland (Canada). |
| HMIS Haideri | Royal Indian Navy | The auxiliary patrol vessel (1,510 GRT) was towing six barges between Madras, India and Trincomalee, Ceylon when she ran hard aground in poor weather on the Sacramento shoal at the entrance of the Godaveri River. She was abandoned the following morning and after inspection was written off as a constructive total loss. There were no casualties. |
| Katha | United Kingdom | World War II: Convoy OS 45: The cargo ship (4,357 GRT) was torpedoed and sunk in the Atlantic Ocean 320 nautical miles (590 km) west of Porto (41°02′N 15°39′W) by U-124 (Kriegsmarine) with the loss of six of her 64 crew. Survivors were rescued by Danby (United Kingdom) and HMS La Malouine (Royal Navy). |
| Melbourne Star | United Kingdom | World War II: The cargo liner (12,806 GRT) was torpedoed and sunk in the Atlantic Ocean (28°05′N 57°30′W) by U-129 (Kriegsmarine) with the loss of 113 of the 117 people on board. The four survivors were rescued 38 days later by a Consolidated PBY Catalina aircraft of the United States Navy. |
| MTB 267 | Royal Navy | The Elco 70' motor torpedo boat (32 GRT) broke her back in a storm in the Mediterranean Sea (34°26′N 16°14′E) while sailing from Benghazi, Libya to Malta and was scuttled after her crew were rescued. |
| Simon Duhamel II | Free France | World War II: Convoy TE 20: The fishing trawler (928 GRT) straggled behind the convoy due to engine trouble. She was torpedoed and sunk in the Mediterranean Sea (36°01′N 2°29′W) by U-755 (Kriegsmarine) with the loss of 53 of her 54 crew. |
| Tergeste | Regia Marina | World War II: The auxiliary patrol boat (212 GRT) was torpedoed and sunk off Gytheio, Greece by Katsonis (Hellenic Navy). The boat, sunk in shallow water, was raised within a few days. |
| Toyo Maru No.2 | Imperial Japanese Navy | World War II: The Toyo Maru-class transport ship (4,162 GRT) was torpedoed and sunk in the Pacific Ocean five miles (8.0 km) west of Poluwat Island, Caroline Islands (07°22′N 149°18′E) by USS Tunny (United States Navy). Fifty-one passengers and crew were killed; there was one survivor. |
| U-124 | Kriegsmarine | World War II: The Type IXB submarine (1,430 GRT) was sunk in the Atlantic Ocean west of Porto, Portugal (41°02′N 15°39′W) by depth charges from HMS Black Swan and HMS Stonecrop (both Royal Navy) with the loss of all 53 crew. |

== 3 April ==
List of shipwrecks: 3 April 1943
| Ship | State | Description |
|---|---|---|
| Aoba | Imperial Japanese Navy | World War II: The Aoba-class cruiser was skip-bombed and damaged at Moewe anchorage, Kavieng, New Ireland by Boeing B-17 Flying Fortress aircraft of the 43rd Bomb Group, United States Fifth Air Force and was beached to prevent sinking. Emergency repairs were performed 3–20 April and she was then towed to Truk and then to Kure. Repairs were finished on 24 November. |
| Arima Maru | Imperial Japanese Navy | World War II: The fleet oiler (7,389 GRT) was torpedoed and damaged north of Palau (10°12′N 134°35′E) by USS Haddock (United States Navy). She sank the next day. Eleven of her crew and sixteen gunners were killed. |
| CH-13 | Imperial Japanese Navy | World War II: The CH-13-class submarine chaser (440 GRT) was torpedoed and sunk in the Pacific Ocean east of Honshu (41°03′N 141°58′E) by USS Pickerel (United States Navy) with the loss of all crew. |
| Florida Maru | Imperial Japanese Navy | World War II: The transport ship was bombed and sunk at Kavieng (02°35′S 150°49′E) by Boeing B-17 Flying Fortress aircraft of the United States Fifth Air Force. |
| Gulfstate | United States | World War II: The tanker (6,882 GRT) was torpedoed and sunk in the Atlantic Ocean 50 nautical miles (93 km; 58 mi) southeast of Marathon Key, Florida (24°26′N 80°18′W), by U-155 (Kriegsmarine) with the loss of 43 of her 61 crew. Survivors were discovered by a United States Navy blimp. They were rescued by a United States Coast Guard aircraft with the assistance of USS Noa (United States Navy). Seventy years later in 2013, she again became a target, this time of the National Oceanic and Atmospheric Administration's Remediation of Underwater Legacy Environmental Threats (RULET) project, which hunts down potential sources of oil pollution from sunken vessels. |
| HA-31 | Imperial Japanese Navy | The unmanned midget submarine was stranded on a sand bank in shallow water, half-buried after their mooring lines snapped in a heavy storm at Kiska, Alaska Territory. Her repairs were never finished as a result of continuing air attacks and more storms. |
| HA-33 | Imperial Japanese Navy | The unmanned midget submarine was stranded on a sand bank in shallow water, half-buried after their mooring lines snapped in a heavy storm at Kiska and was wrecked beyond repair. |
| Nasello | Regia Marina | World War II: The auxiliary patrol vessel was shelled and sunk off the Gulf of Orosei, Sardinia by HMS Safari (Royal Navy). |
| S. Francisco di Paola A. | Italy | World War II: The sailing vessel was shelled and sunk off the Gulf of Orosei, Sardinia by HMS Safari (Royal Navy). |
| SF 78 | Kriegsmarine | The Siebel ferry was lost on this date. |
| SF 104 | Luftwaffe | The Siebel ferry foundered in a storm in the Mediterranean Sea between Sicily, Italy and Tunisia. |
| SF 196 | Luftwaffe | The Siebel ferry foundered in a storm in the Mediterranean Sea between Sicily and Tunisia. |
| SF 203 | Luftwaffe | The Siebel ferry foundered in a storm in the Mediterranean Sea between Sicily and Tunisia. |
| SF 223 | Luftwaffe | The Siebel ferry foundered in a storm in the Mediterranean Sea between Sicily and Tunisia. |
| Volharding | Netherlands | The fishing vessel departed from IJmuiden, North Holland for fishing grounds in the North Sea. No further trace, presumed foundered with the loss of all four of her crew. |
| West Irmo | United States | World War II: The cargo ship was torpedoed and damaged in the Atlantic Ocean (2°10′N 5°35′W) by U-505 (Kriegsmarine) with the loss of ten of her 101 crew. She was taken in tow, but sank the next day (2°17′N 5°25′W). |

== 4 April ==
For the foundering of the British cargo ship Nagara on this day, see the entry for 29 March 1943.

List of shipwrecks: 4 April 1943
| Ship | State | Description |
|---|---|---|
| Altair | Kriegsmarine | World War II: The supply ship was torpedoed and sunk off Kristiansund, Norway (63°01′N 7°02′E) by aircraft of Coastal Command, Royal Air Force. |
| Dover Hill | United Kingdom | World War II: Convoy JW 53: The cargo ship was bombed and severely damaged in the Kola Inlet by Luftwaffe aircraft. |
| Koa Maru | Imperial Japanese Navy | World War II: The Koa Maru-class auxiliary storeship was torpedoed and sunk in the Pacific Ocean 120 nautical miles (220 km; 140 mi) north of Eniwetok (13°11′N 161°57′E) by USS Porpoise (United States Navy). Sixteen of her crew were killed. |
| Patria | Germany | World War II: The cargo ship was bombed and sunk off Stavanger, Norway by aircraft of Coastal Command. |
| Rygja | Germany | World War II: The cargo ship struck a mine and sank in the North Sea off Skagen, Denmark with the loss of a crew member. |
| Sicilia | Regia Marina | World War II: The hospital ship was sunk during an American air raid against Naples. She was refloated in 1949 and scrapped. |
| Uragio Maru | Japan | World War II: American aircraft sank the cargo ship in Kiska Harbor, Territory of Alaska. Uragio Maru had not been seaworthy since she suffered damage in an American air attack on Kiska on 31 December 1942 and in a violent storm that struck Kiska on 4 January 1943. |
| V 1252 | Kriegsmarine | The Vorpostenboot collided with FlJ 27 Schiewenhorst (Kriegsmarine) and sank in the North Sea off Borkum. |

== 5 April ==
List of shipwrecks: 5 April 1943
| Ship | State | Description |
|---|---|---|
| Aloe | United Kingdom | World War II: The cargo ship was torpedoed and sunk in the Indian Ocean 420 nautical miles (780 km; 480 mi) south east of Durban, Union of South Africa (32°37′S 37°50′E) by U-182 (Kriegsmarine). Her 47 crew survived. Her captain was taken on board U-182 as a prisoner of war. The rest of the crew were rescued by Alexander Ramsey (United States). |
| Blitar | Netherlands | World War II: Convoy HX 231: The cargo ship romped ahead of the convoy. She was shelled in the Atlantic Ocean by U-229 (Kriegsmarine) and returned fire. The next day, she was torpedoed and sunk (57°45′N 27°30′W) by U-632 (Kriegsmarine) with the loss of 26 of her 80 crew. |
| British Ardour | United Kingdom | World War II: Convoy HX 231: The tanker was torpedoed and damaged in the Atlantic Ocean west of Ireland (58°08′N 34°04′W) by U-706 (Kriegsmarine). Her 62 crew were rescued by HMS Snowflake and HMS Vidette (both Royal Navy), the former of which scuttled the ship. |
| Ro-34 | Imperial Japanese Navy | World War II: The Kaichū VI (Ro-33-class) submarine was depth charged and sunk in the Pacific Ocean off the Russell Islands (8°15′S 158°58′E) by USS O'Bannon and USS Strong (both United States Navy) with the loss of all 66 crew. |
| San Isidro | Spain | World War II: The cargo ship was torpedoed and sunk in the Mediterranean Sea by Katsonis (Hellenic Navy). |
| Shillong | United Kingdom | World War II: Convoy HX 231: The cargo ship was torpedoed and damaged in the Atlantic Ocean south east of Cape Farewell, Greenland by U-635 (Kriegsmarine). She was then torpedoed and sunk (57°10′N 35°30′W) by U-630 (Kriegsmarine) with the loss of 71 of her 78 crew. Survivors were rescued by Zamalek (United Kingdom). Shillong was on a voyage from Port Lincoln, South Australia to Swansea, Glamorgan. |
| Simeiz | Soviet Navy | World War II: The tug (172 GRT) was sunk by a mine off Cape Myskhako in the Black Sea (44°37′N 37°48′E). There were eight killed and thirteen survivors. |
| SKA-095 | Soviet Navy | World War II: The MO-4-class patrol vessel was sunk by a mine off Cape Myskhako in the Black Sea. |
| Sunoil | United States | World War II: Convoy HX 231: The tanker straggled behind the convoy. She was torpedoed and damaged in the Atlantic Ocean by U-563 (Kriegsmarine). She was later torpedoed and sunk (58°16′N 34°14′W) by U-530 (Kriegsmarine) with the loss of all 69 crew. |
| U-167 | Kriegsmarine | World War II: The Type IXC/40 submarine was depth charged and damaged in the Atlantic Ocean off the Canary Islands, Spain (27°47′N 15°00′W) by a Lockheed Hudson aircraft of 233 Squadron, Royal Air Force. She was scuttled the next day. Her 52 crew survived. |
| U-635 | Kriegsmarine | World War II: The Type VIIC submarine was depth charged and sunk in the Atlantic Ocean south east of Iceland (58°20′N 31°52′W) by a Consolidated B-24 Liberator aircraft of 120 Squadron, Royal Air Force with the loss of all 47 crew. |
| Vaalaren | Sweden | World War II: Convoy HX 231: The cargo ship romped ahead of the convoy. She was torpedoed and sunk in the Atlantic Ocean (approximately 58°N 34°W) by U-229 (Kriegsmarine) with the loss of all 38 crew. |
| Waroonga | United Kingdom | World War II: Convoy HX 231: The cargo ship was torpedoed and damaged in the Atlantic Ocean by U-635 (Kriegsmarine). She was then torpedoed and further damaged by U-630 (Kriegsmarine) with the loss of nineteen of the 132 people aboard. Survivors were rescued by Joel R. Poinsett (United States) and HMS Loosestrife (Royal Navy), which scuttled the ship. |

== 6 April ==
List of shipwrecks: 6 April 1943
| Ship | State | Description |
|---|---|---|
| Carridi | Regia Marina | World War II: The naval trawler was sunk at Trapani, Sicily by Allied aircraft. |
| John Sevier | United States | World War II: Convoy GTMO 83: The Liberty ship was torpedoed and sunk in the Caribbean Sea 20 nautical miles (37 km) off Great Inagua Island, Bahamas (20°17′N 73°32′W) by U-185 (Kriegsmarine). Her 57 crew were rescued by USS Bennett (United States Navy). |
| Josefina Thordén | United Kingdom | World War II: The tanker struck a mine and sank in the Thames Estuary (51°47′18″N 1°28′42″E) with the loss of fifteen of her 55 crew. |
| M 4041 Dr. Augustus Held | Kriegsmarine | World War II: The auxiliary minesweeper struck a mine and sank in the Bay of Biscay off Le Verdon-sur-Mer, Gironde, France. |
| MAS 533 | Regia Marina | World War II: The MAS 526-class torpedo boat was sunk at Trapani by Allied aircraft. |
| MAS 576 | Regia Marina | World War II: The MAS 552-class torpedo boat was sunk at Trapani by Allied aircraft. |
| Rovereto | Italy | World War II: The cargo ship was bombed and sunk off Cape Zebib, Tunisia, by Boeing B-17 Flying Fortress aircraft of the United States Army Air Force. Forty-five of her crew and 60 passengers were killed. There were twelve or 26 survivors, but one of them died of their wounds. |
| San Diego | Germany | World War II: The cargo ship was bombed and sunk off Cape Zebib by Boeing B-17 Flying Fortress aircraft of the United States Army Air Force. All 125 men aboard were rescued. |
| Ste. Lucille | Germany | World War II: The cargo ship was bombed and sunk at Trapani by Allied aircraft. |
| U-632 | Kriegsmarine | World War II: The Type VIIC submarine was depth charged and sunk in the Atlantic Ocean (58°02′N 28°42′W) by a Consolidated B-24 Liberator aircraft of 86 Squadron, Royal Air Force with the loss of all 48 of her crew. |
| UJ 2202 Jutland | Kriegsmarine | World War II: The submarine chaser was bombed and sunk in the Mediterranean Sea by American aircraft. |
| VAS 202 | Regia Marina | World War II: The VAS 201-class submarine chaser was sunk at Trapani by Allied aircraft. |
| Vilsandi | Soviet Union | The cargo liner was wrecked in Lake Ladoga. There were no casualties. |
| Wa Wa | United States | The fishing vessel foundered at Chatham, Alaska Territory. |

== 7 April ==
List of shipwrecks: 7 April 1943
| Ship | State | Description |
|---|---|---|
| USS Aaron Ward | United States Navy | World War II: The Gleaves-class destroyer was bombed and sunk in Ironbottom Sound by Japanese aircraft with the loss of 27 of her 208 crew. |
| Fukuei Maru | Japan | World War II: The cargo ship was torpedoed and sunk off Sanriku by USS Pickerel (United States Navy). Thirty of her crew were killed. |
| USS Kanawha | United States Navy | World War II: The Kanawha-class fleet replenishment oiler was bombed and damaged in Tulagi Harbour, Solomon Islands by Japanese aircraft and was beached. She sank the next day with a loss of nineteen of her crew. |
| Kosei Maru | Imperial Japanese Navy | World War II: The British WWI War Standard G-class auxiliary storeship was torpedoed and severely damaged in the Pacific Ocean 259 nautical miles (480 km) north west of Truk, Marshall Islands (08°45′N 147°10′E) by USS Tunny (United States Navy). Four of her crew were killed. She sank under tow two days later 286 nautical miles (530 km) north west of Truk (08°53′N 146°42′E). |
| HMNZS Moa | Royal New Zealand Navy | World War II: The Bird-class minesweeper was bombed and sunk in Tulagi Harbour by Japanese aircraft with the loss of five of her 35 crew. |
| U-644 | Kriegsmarine | World War II: The Type VIIC submarine was torpedoed and sunk in the Norwegian Sea west of Narvik, Norway (69°38′N 5°40′W) by HMS Tuna (Royal Navy) with the loss of all 45 crew. |

== 8 April ==
List of shipwrecks: 8 April 1943
| Ship | State | Description |
|---|---|---|
| Castillo Montealegre | Spain | World War II: The cargo ship was torpedoed and sunk in the Atlantic Ocean (9°46′N 16°50′W) by U-123 (Kriegsmarine) with the loss of twelve of her 43 crew. Survivors were rescued by HMS Inkpen (Royal Navy). |
| Foggia | Italy | World War II: The cargo ship was torpedoed and sunk in the Mediterranean Sea off the coast of Tunisia by HMS Unshaken (Royal Navy). |
| No. 045 | Soviet Navy | The MO-4-class patrol vessel was lost on this date. |
| SKA-054 | Soviet Navy | World War II: The MO-4-class patrol vessel was sunk by a mine off Gelendzhik. |
| Toyo Maru | Japan | World War II: The cargo ship was bombed and sunk off Rabaul, New Guinea by Consolidated B-24 Liberator aircraft of the United States Army Air Force. |
| U-733 | Kriegsmarine | The Type VIIC submarine collided with a Kriegsmarine patrol boat and sank at Gotenhafen. There were no casualties. She was raised on 16 April. Subsequently repaired, and returned to service in December 1943. |

== 9 April ==
List of shipwrecks: 9 April 1943
| Ship | State | Description |
|---|---|---|
| Annie Oakley | United States | The Liberty ship was torpedoed and sunk in the English Channel off Dungeness, Kent, United Kingdom by a midget submarine. She was on a voyage from Barry, Glamorgan, United Kingdom to Antwerp, Belgium. The wreck was subsequently dispersed by explosives. |
| Bamako | Free France | World War II: Convoy 20K: The cargo ship was torpedoed and sunk in the Atlantic Ocean off Dakar, Senegal (14°57′N 17°15′W) by U-515 (Kriegsmarine) with the loss of six of her crew. |
| Bella Italia | Regia Marina | World War II: The auxiliary minesweeper was torpedoed and sunk off Cape Carbonara, Sardinia by HMS Safari (Royal Navy). |
| Isonami | Imperial Japanese Navy | World War II: The Fubuki-class destroyer was torpedoed and sunk while rescuing survivors of Penang Maru (Japan) in the Buton Passage, off south east Celebes 35 nautical miles (65 km) south east of Wangi-wangi Island, Netherlands East Indies (5°26′S 123°04′E) by USS Tautog (United States Navy) with the loss of seven of her 219 crew. |
| Oyama Maru | Japan | World War II: The cargo ship was torpedoed and sunk 250 nautical miles (460 km) north north west of Kavieng, New Ireland (00°38′N 150°17′E), by USS Drum (United States Navy). Four of her crew were killed. |
| Penang Maru | Japan | World War II: The cargo ship was torpedoed and sunk in the Buton Passage (5°29′S 123°02′E) by USS Tautog (United States Navy). Thirteen troops, a guard and two of her crew were killed. |
| Shanghai Maru | Japan | World War II: Convoy 3202: The cargo ship was torpedoed and sunk in the Isla Verde Passage, Philippines (13°05′N 121°43′E) by USS Grayling (United States Navy). One source says that she was lost with all 45 hands, another states that five lives were lost. 13-05N, 121-43E |

== 10 April ==
List of shipwrecks: 10 April 1943
| Ship | State | Description |
|---|---|---|
| Entella | Italy | World War II: The cargo ship ran aground at Torre Finocchio, Sardinia while avoiding torpedoes fired by HMS Safari (Royal Navy). The same submarine destroyed the wreck with torpedoes the next day. Her crew were rescued. |
| Irene | Germany | World War II: The blockade runner was shelled and sunk in the Atlantic Ocean (43°18′N 14°26′W) by HMS Adventure (Royal Navy). The entire ship's company, including more than 100 personnel of the Kriegsmarine, were rescued by HMS Adventure. |
| Isonzo | Regia Marina | World War II: The tanker was torpedoed and sunk in the Tyrrhenian Sea east of Cagliari, Sardinia by HMS Safari (Royal Navy) with the loss of nine lives. |
| Loredan | Regia Marina | World War II: The auxiliary cruiser was torpedoed and sunk in the Tyrrhenian Sea east of Cagliari by HMS Safari (Royal Navy) with the loss of fifteen lives. |
| MAS 501, and MAS 503 | Regia Marina | World War II: The MAS motor torpedo boats were bombed and sunk at La Maddelena, Sardinia by Boeing B-17 Flying Fortress aircraft of the United States Twelfth Air Force. |
| Trieste | Regia Marina | World War II: The Trento-class cruiser was bombed and sunk at La Maddelena by Boeing B-17 Flying Fortress aircraft of the United States Twelfth Air Force. Seventy-seven of her crew and two civilians were killed. She was raised post-war and sold to Spain in 1951 for a proposed conversion to an aircraft carrier. This was not proceeded with and she was subsequently scrapped. |

== 11 April ==
List of shipwrecks: 11 April 1943
| Ship | State | Description |
|---|---|---|
| Abisko | Sweden | World War II: The cargo ship struck a mine and sank in the North Sea off Schiermonnikoog, Friesland, Netherlands (53°43′N 6°01′E). A crew member was killed and six were wounded. |
| HMS Beverley | Royal Navy | World War II: Convoy ON 176: The Town-class destroyer was torpedoed and sunk in the Atlantic Ocean (52°19′N 40°28′W by U-188 (Kriegsmarine) with the loss of 148 of her 152 crew. |
| Dorpat | Germany | World War II: The cargo ship struck a mine and sank off Aarhus, Denmark. She was refloated on 12 May, repaired and returned to service. |
| Edward B. Dudley | United States | World War II: Convoy HX 232: The Liberty ship straggled behind the convoy. She was torpedoed and sunk in the Atlantic Ocean (approximately 53°N 38°W / 53°N 39°W) by U-615 (Kriegsmarine) with the loss of all 69 crew. |
| Empire Whimbrel | United Kingdom | World War II: The cargo ship was torpedoed and sunk in the Atlantic Ocean 400 nautical miles (740 km; 460 mi) south south west of Freetown, Sierra Leone (2°31′N 15°55′W) by U-181 (Kriegsmarine). Her 53 crew were rescued by HMS Witch and HMS Wolverine (both Royal Navy). |
| F 477 | Kriegsmarine | World War II: The MFP-C2 landing craft was bombed and sunk in Tunis harbor, Tunisia. A crew member was wounded. |
| Fabriano | Italy | World War II: The cargo ship was torpedoed and sunk in the Mediterranean Sea off Palermo, Sicily by aircraft based on Malta. There were fourteen dead and 91 survivors. |
| Frode | Norway | World War II: The coaster struck a mine and sank in the English Channel off the coast of Sussex, United Kingdom (50°45′48″N 0°28′43″W) with the loss of eight of her nineteen crew. |
| Hanyang | United Kingdom | World War II: The cargo ship was bombed and disabled off the coast of Papua New Guinea by Imperial Japanese Army Air Force aircraft. She was on a voyage from Milne Bay to Oro Bay. A crew member was killed and five were wounded. She was subsequently repaired and returned to service. |
| Ingerfire | Norway | World War II: Convoy ONS 2: The cargo ship straggled behind the convoy. She was torpedoed and sunk in the Atlantic Ocean (51°29′N 42°59′W) by U-613 (Kriegsmarine) with the loss of eight of her 36 crew. Survivors were rescued by HMCS Camrose and HMCS St. Croix (both Royal Canadian Navy). |
| James W. Denver | United States | World War II: Convoy UGS 7: The Liberty ship straggled behind the convoy. She was torpedoed and sunk in the Atlantic Ocean 475 nautical miles (880 km) west of the Canary Islands, Spain (28°46′N 25°40′W) by U-195 (Kriegsmarine) with the loss of two of her 67 crew. Survivors were rescued by Cabo Huertas, Campana, Juan (all Spain). Albufeira (Portugal) rescued eighteen survivors on 16 May. The remainder of her crew reached land in their lifeboat. |
| MS 13 | Regia Marina | World War II: The MS 11-class MS boat was sunk at Trapani, Sicily by Allied aircraft. |
| Matt W. Ransom | United States | World War II: Convoy UGS 6A: The Liberty ship, on her maiden voyage, struck two mines in the Mediterranean Sea off Casablanca, Morocco (33°55′N 7°52′W) and was damaged. She was abandoned by her 64 passengers and crew, who were rescued by USS PC-471 and USS PC-481 (both United States Navy). She was later reboarded by seven of her crew and taken to Casablanca for temporary repairs. Later scuttled as a blockship at Utah Beach, France. |
| Narenta | Regia Marina | World War II: The auxiliary cruiser was sunk at Trapani by Allied aircraft. A crew member was killed. She was later raised and scrapped. |
| RD 20 | Regia Marina | World War II: The RD-class minesweeper was sunk at Trapani by Allied aircraft. She was raised in 1945, repaired, and returned to service post-war. |
| Recina | Yugoslavia | World War II: The cargo ship was torpedoed and sunk in the Pacific Ocean east of Australia (37°24′S 150°19′E) by I-26 (Imperial Japanese Navy). There were 32 dead and nineteen survivors. |
| Runo | United Kingdom | World War II: The cargo ship was torpedoed and sunk in the Mediterranean Sea 60 nautical miles (110 km) north of Bardia, Libya (32°15′N 23°55′E) by U-593 (Kriegsmarine) with the loss of sixteen of her 37 crew. |
| Teseo | Regia Marina | World War II: The ocean-going tug was sunk at Trapani by Allied aircraft. Fifteen of her crew were killed. |

== 12 April ==
List of shipwrecks: 12 April 1943
| Ship | State | Description |
|---|---|---|
| Fresno City | United Kingdom | World War II: Convoy HX 232: The cargo ship was torpedoed and damaged in the Atlantic Ocean south east of Cape Farewell, Greenland (54°15′N 30°00′W) by U-563 (Kriegsmarine). She then straggled behind the convoy and was later torpedoed and sunk by U-706 (Kriegsmarine). Her 45 crew were rescued by HMS Azalea (Royal Navy). |
| Froy | Norway | World War II: The fishing vessel was sunk off Harstad by grenades launched by the crew of K-21 (Soviet Navy). A crew member was killed and another died of wounds. The submarine attacked others fishing vessels in the area, sinking none but killing eight of their crew and capturing ten, of which three died in captivity. |
| Lancastrian Prince | United Kingdom | World War II: Convoy ON 176: The cargo ship was torpedoed and sunk in the Atlantic Ocean north east of the Dominion of Newfoundland (50°18′N 42°48′W) by U-404 (Kriegsmarine) with the loss of all 45 crew. Lancastrian Prince was on a voyage from Liverpool, Lancashire to Saint John, New Brunswick, Canada. |
| Pacific Grove | United Kingdom | World War II: Convoy HX 232: The cargo ship was torpedoed and sunk in the Atlantic Ocean south east of Cape Farewell (54°10′N 30°00′W) by U-563 (Kriegsmarine) with the loss of eleven of the 67 people aboard. Survivors were rescued by HMS Azalea (Royal Navy). |
| Sapporo Maru No. 12 | Japan | World War II: The cargo ship was torpedoed and sunk at eastern entrance to Tsugaru Strait, just off Shiriyazaki, northern Honshu, (41°23′N 141°30′E) by USS Flying Fish (United States Navy). A crew member was killed. |
| St Lucien | Vichy France | World War II: The cargo ship was torpedoed and sunk in the Mediterranean Sea by HMS Unruly (Royal Navy). Her crew were rescued. |
| Sydney Maru | Imperial Japanese Army | World War II: Convoy Hansa 2B: The Shanghai Maru-class auxiliary transport was bombed in Hansa Bay, New Guinea (03°18′N 143°38′E) by Boeing B-17 Flying Fortress and Consolidated B-24 Liberator aircraft of the United States Fifth Air Force. She was beached and abandoned. Nine of her crew and three soldiers were killed. |
| Ulysses | Netherlands | World War II: Convoy HX 232: The cargo ship was torpedoed and sunk in the Atlantic Ocean south east of Cape Farewell (54°30′N 30°30′W) by U-563 (Kriegsmarine). Her 41 crew were rescued by HMS Azalea (Royal Navy). |

== 13 April ==
List of shipwrecks: 13 April 1943
| Ship | State | Description |
|---|---|---|
| HNoMS Eskdale | Royal Norwegian Navy | World War II: Convoy PW 323: The Hunt-class destroyer was torpedoed and sunk in the English Channel off Lizard Head, Cornwall, United Kingdom by S 90 and S 112 (both Kriegsmarine). Twenty-five of her crew were killed. |
| Portland | Germany | World War II: The cargo ship was scuttled in the Indian Ocean when intercepted by Georges Leygues (French Navy). |
| Santa Irene | Portugal | World War II: The cargo ship was torpedoed and sunk in the Tyrrhenian Sea east of Cagliari, Sardinia, Italy by HMS Taurus (Royal Navy) with the loss of eighteen of her nineteen crew. |

== 14 April ==
List of shipwrecks: 14 April 1943
| Ship | State | Description |
|---|---|---|
| Emile Allard | France | World War II: The buoy tender was strafed and sunk off Brest, Finistère by Westland Whirlwind aircraft of 263 Squadron, Royal Air Force with the loss of three of her fourteen crew. |
| HA-29 | Imperial Japanese Navy | World War II: The unmanned midget submarine was damaged beyond repair at Kiska, Territory of Alaska by Curtiss P-40 Warhawk aircraft of the Eleventh Air Force, United States Army Air Force. Her wreck was used as spares in an attempt to repair other submarines. |
| HA-34 | Imperial Japanese Navy | The unmanned midget submarine was damaged beyond repair at Kiska by Curtiss P-40 Warhawk aircraft of the Eleventh Air Force, United States Army Air Force. Her wreck was used as spares in an attempt to repair other submarines. |
| Pasvik | Norway | World War II: The icebreaking tug struck a mine and sank in Varangerfjord (69°55′N 30°00′E) with the loss of nine of her crew. Another source says all eleven aboard were killed, possibly including two Germans. |
| Penerf | Vichy France | World War II: The cargo ship was torpedoed and sunk in the Mediterranean Sea off Nice, Alpes-Maritimes (43°32′N 7°12′E) by HMS Ultor (Royal Navy). Twenty-three of the 38 men aboard were killed. |
| Port Victor | United Kingdom | World War II: The refrigerated cargo liner was torpedoed and damaged by U-107 (Kriegsmarine. She was on a voyage from Buenos Aires, Argentina to a British port. |
| Stanlake | United Kingdom | World War II: Convoy PW 323: The cargo ship was torpedoed and sunk in the English Channel off The Lizard, Cornwall by S 82, S 90 and S 112 (all Kriegsmarine). Her 24 crew survived. |
| U-526 | Kriegsmarine | World War II: The Type IXC/40 submarine struck a mine and sank in the Bay of Biscay off Lorient, Morbihan, France (47°30′N 3°45′W) with the loss of 42 of her 54 crew. |
| Van Heemskerk | Netherlands | World War II: The passenger ship was bombed and sunk in Milne Bay by Japanese aircraft with the loss of four lives. |

== 15 April ==
List of shipwrecks: 15 April 1943
| Ship | State | Description |
|---|---|---|
| HMT Adonis | Royal Navy | World War II: The naval trawler was torpedoed and sunk in the North Sea off Lowestoft, Suffolk, by a Kriegsmarine E-boat with the loss of twenty of her 31 crew. |
| Archimede | Regia Marina | World War II: The Brin-class submarine was bombed and sunk in the Atlantic Ocean off the coast of Brazil (03°23′S 30°28′W) by a Consolidated PBY Catalina aircraft of VP 83 Squadron, United States Navy. |
| Borgå | Germany | World War II: The cargo ship was torpedoed and sunk in the North Sea 25 nautical miles (46 km) north east of Borkum by Bristol Beaufighter aircraft of the Royal Air Force with the loss of two of her crew. |
| Clan MacIndoe | United Kingdom | The cargo ship caught fire in the Mediterranean Sea off Alexandria, Egypt. She was beached on 27 April, but declared a total loss due to a broken back and being burnt out. |
| Fedora | Italy | World War II: The transport boat was captured by a Partizan boat and burnt. |
| India Maru | Imperial Japanese Army | World War II: The Daifuku Maru No. 1-class transport ship was bombed and sunk near Kairiru Island (03°12′N 143°43′E) by Boeing B-17 Flying Fortress aircraft of the United States Fifth Air Force. Three gunners and seven of her crew were killed. |
| Kaihei Maru | Imperial Japanese Navy | World War II: The Kaihei Maru-class auxiliary transport ship was torpedoed and sunk in the Pacific Island off the Bonin Islands (21°13′N 152°24′E) by USS Seawolf (United States Navy). Four of her crew were killed. |
| M 5613 Christa | Kriegsmarine | The minesweeper ran aground at Odderøy, Norway and was wrecked. |
| Netztender 14 Simon | Kriegsmarine | World War II: The net tender was sunk by a mine in the Baltic Sea. |
| Shchuka | Soviet Union | World War II: The defecting motorboat was shelled and sunk in the Arctic Sea by MO-123 and MO-133 (both Soviet Navy). |
| Simson | Germany | World War II: The tug struck a mine and sank off Wrangel Island, Soviet Union. |
| USS YP-4536 | United States Navy | The yard patrol craft ran aground and sank on the Bahama Banks. |

== 16 April ==
List of shipwrecks: 16 April 1943
| Ship | State | Description |
|---|---|---|
| Cigno | Regia Marina | World War II: Battle of the Cigno Convoy: The Spica-class torpedo boat was torpedoed and sunk in the Mediterranean Sea south-east of Marettimo by HMS Pakenham and HMS Paladin (both Royal Navy). One hundred and three of her crew were killed. |
| Giacomo Medici | Regia Marina | World War II: The torpedo boat, a former La Masa-class destroyer, was sunk at Catania, Sicily, by American aircraft. Her crew survived. |
| King Edwin | United Kingdom | The cargo ship caught fire at Malta and was scuttled. She was raised in 1945, towed out to sea and sunk. |
| HMS Pakenham | Royal Navy | World War II: Battle of the Cigno Convoy: The P-class destroyer was shelled and crippled in the Mediterranean Sea off Marettimo by Cassiopea and Cigno (both Regia Marina). She was scuttled by HMS Paladin (Royal Navy). Ten of her crew were lost. |
| HSwMS Ulven | Swedish Navy | World War II: The submarine struck a mine and sank in the Skagerrak west of Marstrand with the loss of all 33 crew. |

== 17 April ==
List of shipwrecks: 17 April 1943
| Ship | State | Description |
|---|---|---|
| Amaho Maru | Imperial Japanese Navy | World War II: The cargo ship was torpedoed and sunk in the Pacific Ocean (42°00′N 143°20′E) by USS Flying Fish (United States Navy) with the loss of eight lives. |
| Arizona | Germany | World War II: The cargo ship (5,457 GRT) was sunk in an Allied air raid on Palermo, Sicily, Italy. She was refloated on 22 October 1946 but ran aground whilst under tow and was declared a total loss. |
| Fort Rampart | United Kingdom | World War II: Convoy HX 233: The Fort ship straggled behind the convoy. She was torpedoed and damaged in the Atlantic Ocean (47°22′N 21°58′W) by U-628 (Kriegsmarine). Six of her 56 crew were killed. Survivors were rescued by HMCS Arvida (Royal Canadian Navy). Fort Rampart was later torpedoed again the same day by U-628 but remained afloat. The wreck was torpedoed, shelled and sunk the next day 900 nautical miles (1,700 km; 1,000 mi) east north east of the Azores, Portugal (47°28′N 22°00′W) by U-226 (Kriegsmarine). |
| HMS LCP(R) 780 | Royal Navy | The landing craft, personnel (ramped) was lost when Sembilan (Netherlands) that was carrying her was sunk by Leonardo da Vinci (Regia Marina). |
| HMS LCP(R) 782 | Royal Navy | World War II: The landing craft, personnel (ramped) was lost when Sembilan (Netherlands), that was carrying her, was sunk by Leonardo da Vinci (Regia Marina). |
| Monginevro | Italy | World War II: The cargo ship was torpedoed and sunk in the Mediterranean Sea off Zembretta by HMMTB 634 and HMMTB 656 (Royal Navy). There were no casualties. |
| Naïade | Regia Marina | World War II: The Sirène-class submarine was sunk in a United States Army Air Forces raid on Toulon, Var, France. |
| Nisshin Maru No. 2 | Japan | World War II: The transport was damaged, probably by a mine, in the East China Sea and was abandoned. She eventually drifted ashore on Formosa, China and was later scrapped. |
| Sembilan | Netherlands | World War II: The cargo ship was torpedoed and sunk in the Indian Ocean south of Mauritius (31°30′S 33°30′E) by Leonardo da Vinci (Regia Marina) with the loss of 85 of the 86 people aboard. |
| Shinnan Maru | Japan | World War II: The cargo ship struck a mine laid by US Navy TBF Avenger aircraft on 30 March and sank off Bougainville Island, Solomon Islands (6°50′N 155°45′E). 12 crew and 23 passengers were killed. |
| U-175 | Kriegsmarine | U-175 World War II: The Type IXC submarine was depth charged and sunk in the Atlantic Ocean (47°53′N 22°04′W) by USCGC Spencer ( United States Coast Guard) with the loss of thirteen of her 54 crew. Survivors were rescued by USCGC Spencer and USCGC Duane ( United States Coast Guard) and made prisoners of war. |

== 18 April ==
List of shipwrecks: 18 April 1943
| Ship | State | Description |
|---|---|---|
| Corbis | United Kingdom | World War II: The tanker was torpedoed and sunk in the Indian Ocean 500 nautical miles (930 km; 580 mi) east south east of Port Elizabeth, Union of South Africa (34°56′S 34°03′E) by U-180 (Kriegsmarine) with the loss of 50 of her 60 crew. Survivors were rescued by a South African Air Force rescue boat. |
| Empire Bruce | United Kingdom | World War II: The cargo ship was torpedoed and sunk in the Atlantic Ocean (6°40′N 13°17′W) by U-123 (Kriegsmarine). Her 49 crew were rescued by HMMMS 107 (Royal Navy). |
| Høegh Carrier | Germany | World War II: The cargo ship was bombed and sunk in the North Sea off Den Helder, North Holland, Netherlands by Bristol Beaufighter aircraft of the Royal Air Force with the loss of two of her crew. |
| Liv | Italy | World War II: The cargo ship was bombed and sunk at Porto Torres, Sardinia by Royal Air Force aircraft. She was later refloated. |
| Luigi Razza | Italy | World War II: The cargo ship was bombed and sunk at Port Torres by Royal Air Force aircraft. She was refloated in 1945 and repaired, returning to service in 1946 as Antonio Strazzera. |
| Manaar | United Kingdom | World War II: The cargo ship was torpedoed and sunk in the Indian Ocean south of Mauritius by Leonardo da Vinci (Regia Marina). There were four killed and 94 survivors. |
| Nisshun Maru | Imperial Japanese Navy | World War II: The ammunition transport was torpedoed and sunk 200 nautical miles (370 km; 230 mi) north north west of Mussau Island, Bismarck Archipelago (01°55′N 148°24′E) by USS Drum (United States Navy). Thirty-five of her crew were killed. Survivors were rescued by CH-18 (Imperial Japanese Navy). |
| HMS P615 | Royal Navy | World War II: The Oruç Reis-class submarine was torpedoed and sunk in the Atlantic Ocean (6°49′N 13°09′W) by U-123 (Kriegsmarine) with the loss of all 44 crew. |
| HMS Regent | Royal Navy | World War II: The Rainbow-class submarine struck a mine and sank in the Strait of Otranto with the loss of all 63 crew. |
| Two unnamed seiners | Soviet Union | World War II: The seiners were sunk in the Black Sea by Kriegsmarine R boats and S boats. |
| UJ 2205 Le Jacques Coeur | Kriegsmarine | World War II: The submarine chaser was torpedoed and sunk in the Mediterranean Sea north north west of Isola di Femmine, Sicily, Italy (38°15′N 13°13′E) by HMS Unseen (Royal Navy). Four of her crew were killed and eleven were wounded. Survivors were rescued by VAS 207 and VAS 230 (both Regia Marina). |
| V 1409 Limburgia | Kriegsmarine | World War II: The Vorpostenboot was torpedoed and sunk in the Seine Bay by HMMGB 38 and HMMGB 39 (both Royal Navy). |
| USS YC-891 | United States Navy | The unpowered covered lighter sank while under tow off Key West, Florida. |

== 19 April ==
List of shipwrecks: 19 April 1943
| Ship | State | Description |
|---|---|---|
| Alpino | Regia Marina | World War II: The Soldati-class destroyer was sunk at La Spezia by aircraft of the Bomber Command, Royal Air Force. Forty-eight of her crew were killed. |
| Banshu Maru No. 5 | Imperial Japanese Navy | World War II: The Banshu Maru No. 5 -class auxiliary storeship was torpedoed and sunk in the Pacific Ocean about 108 nautical miles (200 km; 124 mi) north west of Iwo Jima (26°15′N 139°35′E) by USS Seawolf (United States Navy). Fourteen of her crew were killed. |
| Bivona | Italy | World War II: The cargo ship was torpedoed and sunk in the Mediterranean Sea northwest of Trapani, Sicily (38°11′N 11°44′E) by HMS Unrivalled (Royal Navy). Out of 56 men aboard – 38 Italians and eighteen Germans, including crew and passing soldiers heading to Tunisia – only eight survived: three Italians and five Germans. |
| Francesco Crispi | Italy | World War II: The cargo ship was torpedoed and sunk in the Tyrrhenian Sea off Elba (42°46′N 9°46′E) by HMS Saracen (Royal Navy). Depending on sources, there were between 1,200 and 1,300 men (crew and troops) aboard, of which 676 were saved and more than 500 were lost. |
| Mostaganem | Italy | World War II: The cargo ship, which was carrying Allied prisoners, was bombed and damaged in the Mediterranean Sea by Allied aircraft. She was then torpedoed and sunk by HMS Unrivalled (Royal Navy) north of Marettimo Island. Two of her crew were killed. There were 25 survivors. |
| Robert Gray | United States | World War II: Convoy HX 234: The Liberty ship straggled behind the convoy. She was torpedoed and sunk in the Atlantic Ocean (50°57′N 40°35′W) by U-108 (Kriegsmarine) with the loss of all 62 crew. |
| TKA-84 | Soviet Navy | World War II: The G-5-class motor torpedo boat was sunk in the Black Sea by Luftwaffe aircraft. There was one survivor. |

== 20 April ==
List of shipwrecks: 20 April 1943
| Ship | State | Description |
|---|---|---|
| El Amirante | Panama | World War II: Convoy HX 235: The cargo ship foundered in the Atlantic Ocean in a storm. She had previously been in collision with Elias Boudinot (United States). |
| Kosei Maru | Japan | World War II: The cargo ship was bombed and sunk north of Wewak, New Guinea by aircraft of the United States Army Air Force with the loss of 199 lives. |
| Lena Luckenbach | United States | World War II: Convoy HX 233: The cargo ship collided with James Fenimore Cooper (United States) in the Atlantic Ocean and was abandoned by her 62 crew, who were rescued by Lightning (United States). Lena Luckenbach was boarded by a salvage party from HMS Bergamot (Royal Navy) and beached at Kames Bay. She was later repaired and returned to service. |
| Meiji Maru No.1 Go | Imperial Japanese Navy | World War II: The Peacetime Standard Type D auxiliary gunboat was torpedoed and sunk in the Pacific Ocean off Honshu (37°10′N 141°25′E) by USS Scorpion (United States Navy) with the loss of nine of her crew. |
| Michigan | United States | World War II: Convoy UGS 7: The Design 1013 ship was torpedoed and sunk in the Mediterranean Sea 60 nautical miles (110 km) west of Oran, Algeria (35°59′N 1°25′W) by U-565 (Kriegsmarine). All 61 people on board were rescued by HMS Foxtrot and HMT Stella Carina (both Royal Navy). |
| Sidi-Bel-Abbès | France | World War II: Convoy UGS 7: The troopship was torpedoed and sunk in the Mediterranean Sea 10 nautical miles (19 km) north of the Habibas Islands, Algeria (35°59′N 1°25′W) by U-565 (Kriegsmarine) with the loss of 611 of the 1,131 people on board. Lifeboats from Michigan (United States) rescued many of the Senegalese soldiers on board. |
| Suceava | Romania | World War II: The cargo ship was torpedoed and sunk in the Black Sea (44°53′N 31°24′E) by S-33 (Soviet Navy). There were 28 dead and 70 survivors. The wreck was subsequently refloated and scrapped. |
| Sumatra Maru | Imperial Japanese Army | The Celebes Maru No. 1-class transport ran aground on a submerged reef in rough seas at night heading to the San Bernardino Strait. She was refloated and anchored seven kilometres (4.3 mi) east of the San Bernardino Strait off Luzon, Philippines. |

== 21 April ==
List of shipwrecks: 21 April 1943
| Ship | State | Description |
|---|---|---|
| Ashantian | United Kingdom | World War II: Convoy ONS 3: The cargo ship was torpedoed and sunk in the Atlantic Ocean north east of St. John's, Dominion of Newfoundland (55°46′N 45°14′W) by U-415 (Kriegsmarine) with the loss of sixteen of her 67 crew. Survivors were rescued by HMT Northern Gift (Royal Navy). |
| Erich Ohlrogge | Germany | World War II: The cargo ship struck a mine and sank off eastern Jutland, Denmark. |
| Flora Alberta | Canada | The fishing schooner collided with Fanad Head (United Kingdom) approximately 140 kilometres (76 nmi) southeast of Halifax, Nova Scotia. The ship was sliced in half and subsequently sunk, with the loss of 21 of her 28 crew. |
| USS Grenadier | United States Navy | World War II: The Tambor-class submarine, immobilized by irreparable propulsion failure, was ineffectively shelled by the netlayer Choko Maru (Imperial Japanese Navy) and bombed and damaged in the Strait of Malacca off Penang, Malaya by a Japanese aircraft. She was consequently scuttled by her crew at 6°30′N 97°40′E. All 76 crew were taken as prisoners of war by Choko Maru. |
| John Drayton | United States | World War II: The Liberty ship was torpedoed and sunk in the Indian Ocean (32°10′S 34°50′E) by Leonardo da Vinci (Regia Marina). Fourteen survivors were rescued on 27 April by HMS Relentless (Royal Navy). Eight of 24 originally in a second lifeboat are rescued on 21 May. Six gunners and 21 crewmen die in the sinking or in the ordeal in the lifeboats. |
| KT 7 | Kriegsmarine | World War II: The transport ship was sunk in the Mediterranean Sea by HMS Laforey, HMS Loyal and HMS Lookout (all Royal Navy). There were 37 dead and twelve survivors. |
| HMS LCI(L)-7 | Royal Navy | World War II: The landing craft, infantry (large) was bombed by Luftwaffe aircraft at Algiers, Algeria. She was beached and left to burn. Four men were killed. |
| Marco Foscarini | Italy | World War II: The cargo ship was torpedoed and sunk by HMS Unison (Royal Navy) in the Strait of Sicily west of Marsala, Italy (37°50′N 11°30′E). Depending on sources there were 25 or 28 dead, one died of wounds and there were 95 or 96 survivors. |
| Scebeli | Norway | World War II: Convoy ON 178: The cargo ship was torpedoed and sunk in the Atlantic Ocean (56°07′N 44°26′W) by U-191 (Kriegsmarine) with the loss of two of her 40 crew. Survivors were rescued by HMS Kale (Royal Navy). |
| HMS Splendid | Royal Navy | World War II: The S-class submarine was shelled and damaged in the Mediterranean Sea off Corsica, France by Hermes (Kriegsmarine) with the loss of eighteen of her 45 crew. She was scuttled to prevent capture before the survivors were rescued and taken as prisoners of war. |
| Wanstead | United Kingdom | World War II: Convoy ONS 3: The cargo ship straggled behind the convoy. She was torpedoed and damaged in the Atlantic Ocean south east of Cape Farewell, Greenland (55°46′N 45°14′W) by U-415 (Kriegsmarine) with the loss of two of her 50 crew. Survivors were rescued by HMT Northern Gift and HMS Poppy (both Royal Navy). Wanstead was later torpedoed and sunk by U-413 (Kriegsmarine). |

== 22 April ==
List of shipwrecks: 22 April 1943
| Ship | State | Description |
|---|---|---|
| Amerika | United Kingdom | World War II: Convoy HX 234: The cargo liner straggled behind the convoy. She was torpedoed and sunk in the Atlantic Ocean (57°30′N 42°50′W) by U-306 (Kriegsmarine) with the loss of 86 of the 130 people on board. Survivors were rescued by HMS Asphodel (Royal Navy). |
| Duna | Germany | World War II: The cargo ship struck a German mine and sank in Lyngefjord. There were nine dead and twelve survivors. |
| HMS Herring | Royal Navy | World War II: Convoy FN 108: The Fish-class trawler was sunk in a collision with Cassard (France) two nautical miles (3.7 km; 2.3 mi) north of Buoy No. 20, north east of Blyth, Northumberland (51°19′N 1°21′W). Her crew were rescued by Cassard. |
| Milano | Regia Marina | World War II: The minesweeper was torpedoed and sunk in the Mediterranean Sea by HMS Unbroken (Royal Navy). |
| Tagliamento | Italy | World War II: The cargo ship was torpedoed and sunk in the Mediterranean Sea (42°46′N 9°46′E) by HMS Saracen (Royal Navy). |
| Valente | Italy | World War II: The tug was attacked and set afire off Cape Vaticano by HMS Sahib (Royal Navy). |
| Yamazato Maru | Japan | World War II: The cargo ship was torpedoed and sunk in the Strait of Malacca (3°28′N 99°47′E) by HNLMS O 21 (Royal Netherlands Navy). Eighteen crew, four gunners and 34 passengers were killed. |

== 23 April ==
List of shipwrecks: 23 April 1943
| Ship | State | Description |
|---|---|---|
| DB-5 | Soviet Navy | World War II: The No. 1-class landing boat was sunk by artillery fire off the beachhead of Malaya Zemlya, Myskhako, Soviet Union. A crew member died after giving his lifejacket to a wounded soldier. |
| Patrol Boat No. 39 | Imperial Japanese Navy | Patrol Boat No. 39 sinking after being torpedoed by USS Seawolf on 23 April 1943. World War II: The No.31-class patrol boat was torpedoed and sunk in the Philippine Sea off Yonaguni Island (23°48′N 122°42′E) by the submarine USS Seawolf (United States Navy). |
| U-189 | Kriegsmarine | World War II: The Type IXC/40 submarine was depth charged and sunk in the Atlantic Ocean east of Cape Farewell, Greenland by a Consolidated B-24 Liberator aircraft of 120 Squadron, Royal Air Force with the loss of all 54 crew. |
| U-191 | Kriegsmarine | World War II: The Type IXC/40 submarine was depth charged and sunk in the Atlantic Ocean south east of Cape Farewell (56°45′N 36°25′W) by HMS Hesperus (Royal Navy) with the loss of all 55 crew. |
| USS YP-422 | United States Navy | The yard patrol craft ran aground and sank on the Tumbo Reef, 3 nautical miles (5.6 km) south east of the North Bulari Passage, a break in the reefs on the approach to Nouméa, New Caledonia. |

== 24 April ==
List of shipwrecks: 24 April 1943
| Ship | State | Description |
|---|---|---|
| Aquino | Italy | World War II: The cargo ship was bombed and sunk in the Mediterranean Sea by American aircraft. Nine of the 135 men aboard died. |
| El Estero | Panama | El Estero After loading ammunition, the cargo ship caught fire at the New York Port of Embarkation's Caven Point Terminal off Jersey City, New Jersey. To avoid a disastrous explosion, the ship was towed into an area of shallow water near Robbins Reef Light in Upper New York Bay, where the New York City Fire Department fireboats Fire Fighter and John J. Harvey (both United States) deliberately sank her by pouring water into her holds. She was later raised and towed out of the harbor for use as a naval gunnery target. |
| Galiola | Regia Marina | World War II: The transport ship was torpedoed and sunk in the Mediterranean Sea off Capo di Milazzo, Sicily by HMS Sahib (Royal Navy). Forty of the 45 men aboard were rescued. |
| Kasuga Maru | Imperial Japanese Navy | World War II: The cargo ship was torpedoed and sunk in the Tsugaru Strait (41°42′N 141°20′E) by USS Flying Fish (United States Navy) with the loss of 27 lives. |
| Kowarra | Australia | World War II: The cargo ship was torpedoed and sunk 35 nautical miles (65 km) north east of Sandy Cape, Queensland (24°26′S 153°44′E) by I-26 (Imperial Japanese Navy). Her master, nineteen crewmen, and a gunner were killed. Eleven survivors were rescued by USS SC-747 (United States Navy). |
| HMS Sahib | Royal Navy | World War II: The S-class submarine was depth charged and damaged in the Mediterranean Sea off Capo di Milazzo, Sicily by Junkers Ju 88 aircraft of the Luftwaffe. She was then attacked by Climene, Gabbiano, and Euterpe, (all Regia Marina). She was scuttled by her crew; all 48 were rescued and taken as prisoners of war, one of them later died of wounds. |
| Santa Catalina | United States | World War II: The Type C2-S-B1 cargo ship was torpedoed and sunk in the Atlantic Ocean 370 nautical miles (690 km; 430 mi) north east of Cape Hatteras, North Carolina (30°42′N 70°58′W) by U-129 (Kriegsmarine). All 95 people on board were rescued by Venezia (Sweden). |
| SF 217 | Luftwaffe | World War II: The Siebel ferry was bombed and sunk in the Mediterranean Sea between Marsala, Sicily and Tunisia. |
| SKA-058 | Soviet Navy | World War II: The MO-4-class patrol vessel was sunk by a mine off Myskhako. |
| U-710 | Kriegsmarine | World War II: The Type VIIC submarine was depth charged and sunk in the Atlantic Ocean south of Iceland (61°25′N 19°48′W) by a Boeing B-17 Flying Fortress aircraft of 206 Squadron, Royal Air Force with the loss of all 49 crew. |

== 25 April ==
List of shipwrecks: 25 April 1943
| Ship | State | Description |
|---|---|---|
| Doryssa | United Kingdom | World War II: The tanker was torpedoed and sunk in the Indian Ocean (37°03′S 24°03′E) by Leonardo da Vinci (Regia Marina) with the loss of 53 of her 64 crew. |
| Empire Morn | United Kingdom | World War II: The cargo ship struck a mine and was severely damaged in the Atlantic Ocean off Casablanca, Morocco (at 33°52′N 7°50′W), with the loss of 46 of her 71 crew. Later she was towed to Gibraltar, but was declared a constructive total loss. Subsequently repaired and returned to service. |
| HMS LCG 15 | Royal Navy | The landing craft, gun, on a voyage from Belfast, County Antrim to Falmouth, Cornwall, sank off Freshwater West, Pembrokeshire in a storm, with the loss of all on board (at least 36 sailors and marines). |
| HMS LCS(M) 17 | Royal Navy | World War II: The landing craft, support (mortar) was sunk in a battle against the Japanese on the Mayu River, Burma. |
| Leesee | Germany | World War II: The cargo ship was torpedoed and sunk in the White Sea off the Makkaur Lighthouse, Norway by Soviet aircraft. There were eleven dead and 40 survivors. |
| No. 0212 | Soviet Navy | The MO-4-class patrol vessel was lost on this date. |
| Rosenborg | United Kingdom | World War II: Convoy RU 71: The cargo ship straggled behind the convoy. She was torpedoed and sunk in the Atlantic Ocean (approximately 61°N 15°W) by U-385 (Kriegsmarine) with the loss of 28 of her 30 crew. Survivors were rescued by Goodwin (United Kingdom). |
| Rouennais | France | World War II: The cargo ship struck a mine and sank in the Atlantic Ocean off Casablanca, Morocco (34°04′N 7°23′W), with the loss of sixteen of her 55 crew. |
| U-203 | Kriegsmarine | World War II: The Type VIIC submarine was depth charged and sunk in the Atlantic Ocean off Cape Farewell, Greenland (55°05′N 42°25′W) by Fairey Swordfish aircraft of 811 Squadron, Fleet Air Arm, based on HMS Biter and by HMS Opportune and HMS Pathfinder (all Royal Navy) with the loss of ten of her 48 crew. |
| Wullenwever | Kriegsmarine | World War II: The minelayer struck mines and sank in the Baltic Sea. |
| USS YP-481 | United States Navy | The yard patrol boat grounded and was wrecked in the Atlantic Ocean off Charleston, South Carolina. |

== 26 April ==
List of shipwrecks: 26 April 1943
| Ship | State | Description |
|---|---|---|
| F 158A | Kriegsmarine | The MFP-A landing craft was sunk on this date. |
| HMS LCG 16 | Royal Navy | The landing craft, gun, on voyage from Belfast, County Antrim to Falmouth, Cornwall, sank off Freshwater West, Pembrokeshire in a storm, with the loss of all on board (at least 35 sailors and marines). |
| Limerick | United Kingdom | World War II: The cargo ship was torpedoed and sunk in the Pacific Ocean 20 nautical miles (37 km; 23 mi) south east of Cape Byron, New South Wales Australia (28°54′S 153°54′E) by I-177 (Imperial Japanese Navy) with the loss of two of her 72 crew. |
| Marmara | Kriegsmarine | The MFP-C2 landing craft was sunk on this date. |
| R 114 | Kriegsmarine | World War II: The auxiliary minesweeper struck a mine and sank in the English Channel off the Pas-de-Calais coast. |
| SF 166 | Luftwaffe | World War II: The Siebel ferry was bombed and sunk in the Mediterranean Sea between Marsala, Sicily, Italy and Tunis, Tunisia. |
| SF 167 | Luftwaffe | World War II: The Siebel ferry was bombed and sunk in the Mediterranean Sea between Marsala and Tunis. |
| USS YP-47 | United States Navy | The yard patrol craft was sunk in the Ambrose Channel off Staten Island, New York in a collision with USS YMS-110 (United States Navy). |

== 27 April ==
List of shipwrecks: 27 April 1943
| Ship | State | Description |
|---|---|---|
| Helma | Germany | World War II: The motor schooner, carrying a cargo of potatoes, was sunk off Jersey by Westland Whirlwind aircraft of 263 Squadron, Royal Air Force. |
| Lydia M. Childs | United States | World War II: The Liberty ship was torpedoed and sunk in the Pacific Ocean 100 nautical miles (190 km) off Port Stephens, New South Wales, Australia (33°08′S 153°24′E) by I-178 (Imperial Japanese Navy). There were no casualties. |
| M 4611 Etienne Rimbert | Kriegsmarine | World War II: The minesweeper was sunk in the English Channel off St Helier, Jersey, Channel Islands by Westland Whirlwind aircraft of 263 Squadron, Royal Air Force. At least two of her crew were killed. She was later refloated, repaired and returned to service. |
| Merope | Netherlands | World War II: The cargo ship was torpedoed and sunk in the Mediterranean Sea ten nautical miles (19 km; 12 mi) east north east of Cape Bengut, Algeria by U-371 (Kriegsmarine) with the loss of ten of her 34 crew. |
| Trondhjemsfjord | Germany | World War II: The cargo ship was bombed and sunk in the North Sea off the Ryvingen Lighthouse, Norway, by Allied aircraft. Two German gunners were killed. |
| U-174 | Kriegsmarine | World War II: The Type IXC submarine was depth charged and sunk in the Atlantic Ocean south of the Dominion of Newfoundland (43°35′N 56°18′W) by Lockheed Ventura aircraft of the United States Navy with the loss of all 53 crew. |
| Yuzan Maru | Japan | World War II: The cargo liner was torpedoed and sunk in the Pacific Ocean off the east coast of Honshu (38°08′N 143°03′E) by USS Scorpion (United States Navy). |

== 28 April ==
List of shipwrecks: 28 April 1943
| Ship | State | Description |
|---|---|---|
| UJ 1402 Berlin | Kriegsmarine | World War II: The submarine chaser was shelled and sunk by HMS Goathland and HMS Albrighton (both Royal Navy) and a group of motor torpedo boats while escorting the blockade runner Butterfly off Les Sept-Îles four nautical miles (7.4 km; 4.6 mi) north east of Trégastel, Côtes du Nord, France (48°54′N 3°48′W). Two of her crew were killed and another died of his wounds. |
| Butterfly | Italy | World War II: The blockade runner, on passage from Saint-Nazaire, Loire-Inférieure to Le Havre, Charente-Inférieure, France with a strong Kriegsmarine escort, was torpedoed, shelled and sunk off Les Sept-Îles 4 nautical miles (7.4 km) north east of the Brittany village of Trégastel by HMS Goathland and HMS Albrighton (both Royal Navy) accompanied by a group of motor torpedo boats. Eleven Italian sailors and at least seven German sailors and gunners were killed. |
| Camillo I | Regia Marina | World War II: The auxiliary minesweeper was sunk off Cape Bon, Tunisia by HMMTB 633, HMMTB 637 and HMMTB 639 (all Royal Navy). All twelve crew survived. |
| Climene | Regia Marina | World War II: The Spica-class torpedo boat was sunk west of Sicily by HMS Unshaken (Royal Navy). There were 53 dead and 91 survivors. |
| Fl.B 432 | Kriegsmarine | World War II: The lifeboat was fired upon by three British motor torpedo boats, after which it was abandoned and blown up by its own crew at Sidi Daoud, Tunisia. |
| Impero | Regia Marina | World War II: The auxiliary minesweeper was sunk off Cape Bon by HMMTB 633, HMMTB 637 and HMMTB 639 (all Royal Navy). There were eleven survivors. |
| Kamakura Maru | Japan | World War II: The Asama Maru-class troopship was torpedoed and sunk in the Sulu Sea, southwest of Naso Point, Panay, Philippines (10°18′N 121°44′E) by USS Gudgeon (United States Navy). Accounts vary as to the number of passengers carried and casualties, but she was carrying some 2,500 passengers, including Imperial Japanese Navy personnel, around 1,000 oil production specialists and 150 females lost, and 176 (or 204 crew). Rescue operations were only started on 2 May and only 28 crew and 437 passengers are rescued sometime after 2 May. More than 2,150 lives were lost. |
| Ortelsburg | Germany | World War II: Operation Mardonius: The cargo ship was sunk at Oslo, Norway, by saboteurs led by Max Manus. |
| SF 214 | Kriegsmarine | World War II: The Siebel ferry was sunk by Allied aircraft west of Zembra, Tunisia. |
| SF 217 | Kriegsmarine | World War II: The Siebel ferry was sunk by Allied aircraft west of Zembra. |
| Tugela | Germany | World War II: Operation Mardonius: The cargo ship was sunk at Oslo, Norway due to sabotage by the Norwegian resistance movement. She was later raised, repaired and returned to service. |
| HMMTB 639 | Royal Navy | World War II: The Fairmile D motor torpedo boat was shelled and sunk off Cape Bon by Sagittario (Regia Marina) and Regia Aeronautica aircraft. Six of her crew were killed and another died of wounds. |

== 29 April ==
List of shipwrecks: 29 April 1943
| Ship | State | Description |
|---|---|---|
| Aludra | Kriegsmarine | World War II: The transport ship was torpedoed and sunk in the North Sea off Terschelling, Friesland, Netherlands (52°28′N 4°01′E) by Bristol Beaufighter aircraft of the Royal Air Force. |
| Arkadia | Germany | World War II: The cargo ship struck a mine and sank in the Black Sea ten nautical miles (19 km; 12 mi) north east of Constanţa, Romania. Her crew was rescued by her escort ships. She was refloated in 1946, repaired and entered Soviet service. |
| Holland | Germany | World War II: The tug struck a mine and sank in the North Sea off Drogden, Norway. At least two of her crew died. |
| McKeesport | United States | World War II: Convoy ONS 5: The cargo ship was torpedoed and damaged in the Atlantic Ocean (60°52′N 34°20′W) by U-258 (Kriegsmarine) with the loss of one of her 68 crew. Survivors were rescued by HMT Northern Gem (Royal Navy). McKeesport was later torpedoed and sunk by U-258, or was later shelled and sunk by HMS Tay (Royal Navy). |
| Nanking | Sweden | World War II: The cargo ship was torpedoed and sunk in the Atlantic Ocean (5°10′N 11°10′W) by U-123 (Kriegsmarine). All 32 crew survived. |
| Narvik | Sweden | World War II: The cargo ship was torpedoed and sunk in the North Sea off Terschelling (53°27′N 4°49′E) by Bristol Beaufighter aircraft of the Royal Air Force. Her 38 crew were rescued. |
| R 36 | Kriegsmarine | World War II: The minesweeper struck a mine and sank in the Black Sea off Constanţa. |
| Sturzsee | Germany | World War II: The cargo ship was torpedoed and sunk off Cape Nordkinn, Norway by S-55 (Soviet Navy). |
| Taifun | Germany | World War II: The tug struck a mine and sank in the North Sea south of Drogden. |
| U-332 | Kriegsmarine | World War II: The Type VIIC submarine was depth charged and sunk in the Bay of Biscay north of Cape Finisterre, Spain (45°08′N 9°33′W) by a Consolidated B-24 Liberator aircraft of 224 Squadron, Royal Air Force with the loss of all 45 crew. |
| V 1408 Aue | Kriegsmarine | World War II: The Vorpostenboot was torpedoed and sunk in the North Sea off IJmuiden, North Holland, Netherlands by HMMTB 633, HMMTB 637 and HMMTB 639 (all Royal Navy). Nineteen of her crew were killed and one died of wounds. There were fifteen survivors. |
| V 807 Auguste Kämpf | Kriegsmarine | World War II: The Vorpostenboot was torpedoed and sunk in the North Sea off Terschelling by Bristol Beaufighter aircraft of the Royal Air Force. At least one of her crew died. |
| Wollongbar | Australia | World War II: The cargo ship was torpedoed and sunk in the Pacific Ocean 55 nautical miles (102 km; 63 mi) east south east of Smokey Cape, New South Wales (31°17′S 153°07′E) by I-180 (Imperial Japanese Navy). Thirty-two crewmen were killed. Five survivors were rescued by the fishing trawler X.L.C.R. (Australia). |

== 30 April ==
List of shipwrecks: 30 April 1943
| Ship | State | Description |
|---|---|---|
| Bandar Shahpour | United Kingdom | World War II: Convoy TS 37: The cargo ship was torpedoed and sunk in the Atlantic Ocean 130 nautical miles (240 km) south west of Freetown, Sierra Leone (7°15′N 13°49′W) by U-515 (Kriegsmarine) with the loss of one of the 78 people on board. Survivors were rescued by HMT Birdlip (Royal Navy). |
| Corabella | United Kingdom | World War II: Convoy TS 37: The cargo ship was torpedoed and sunk in the Atlantic Ocean 130 nautical miles (240 km; 150 mi) south west of Freetown (7°15′N 13°49′W) by U-515 (Kriegsmarine) with the loss of nine of her 48 crew. Survivors were rescued by HMT Birdlip (Royal Navy). |
| Ebisu Maru No. 5 Go | Imperial Japanese Navy | World War II: The auxiliary guard boat was damaged in an exchange of fire with USS Scorpion (United States Navy), then was torpedoed, blew up and sank in the Pacific Ocean with the loss of all 24 hands. |
| Fauna | Italy | World War II: The transport ship was shelled and sunk in the Mediterranean Sea off the coast of Sicily, Italy by HMS Nubian and HMS Paladin (both Royal Navy). Twenty of the 24 men aboard were rescued. |
| Hermes | Kriegsmarine | World War II: The Vasilefs Georgios-class destroyer was bombed and severely damaged by British aircraft off Cape Bon, Tunisia. Twenty-three crewmen were killed. She was towed to La Goulette, Tunisia and scuttled there on 7 May. |
| Kota Tjandi | Netherlands | World War II: Convoy TS 37: The cargo ship was torpedoed and sunk in the Atlantic Ocean 130 nautical miles (240 km; 150 mi) south west of Freetown (7°15′N 13°49′W) by U-515 (Kriegsmarine) with the loss of six of her 77 crew. |
| Lampo | Regia Marina | World War II: The Folgore-class destroyer was sunk in the Mediterranean Sea off Tunis, Tunisia by American Curtiss P-40 Warhawk aircraft. Fifty-nine or 60 of the 213 men aboard died. |
| Leone Pancaldo | Regia Marina | World War II: The Navigatori-class destroyer was bombed and sunk by American Curtiss P-40 Warhawk aircraft north north east of Cape Bon. One hundred and twenty-four of her 280 crew and 75 of the 247 German soldiers she was carrying were killed. |
| Malmö | Sweden | World War II: The train ferry struck a mine off Copenhagen, Denmark and was beached on the Swedish coast. There were no casualties. She was raised and repaired, and resumed service in July. |
| MAS 552 | Regia Marina | World War II: The MAS 552-class MAS boat was sunk off Zembra, Tunisia by Allied aircraft with the loss of eight lives. |
| MS 25 | Regia Marina | World War II: The MS 11-class MS boat was severely damaged off Zembra by Allied aircraft. She was run aground on Zembra Island, and was never repaired. There were no casualties. |
| Nagina | United Kingdom | World War II: Convoy TS 37: The cargo ship was torpedoed and sunk in the Atlantic Ocean 130 nautical miles (240 km; 150 mi) south west of Freetown (7°19′N 13°50′W) by U-515 (Kriegsmarine) with the loss of two of her 113 crew. Survivors were rescued by HMT Birdlip (Royal Navy). |
| Phoebe A. Hearst | United States | World War II: The Liberty ship was torpedoed and sunk in the Pacific Ocean south of Fiji (20°07′S 177°33′E) by I-19 (Imperial Japanese Navy). All hands were rescued; eight by a Consolidated PBY Catalina on 1 May, 23 by USS YMS-89 (United States Navy) on 5 May, and 25 by USS Dash (United States Navy) on 14 May. |
| RA-10 | Kriegsmarine | World War II: The minesweeper, a former Elco 77' PT boat, was bombed and sunk in the Mediterranean Sea off La Goulette, Tunisia by Royal Air Force aircraft. Six of her 21 crew were killed. |
| Shonan Maru No. 12 Go | Imperial Japanese Navy | World War II: The auxiliary submarine chaser was sunk by Allied aircraft at Rangoon, Burma. |
| Teramo | Italy | World War II: The cargo ship was bombed and sunk in the Mediterranean Sea by American aircraft. |
| U-227 | Kriegsmarine | World War II: The Type VIIC submarine was depth charged and sunk in the Atlantic Ocean north of the Faroe Islands (64°05′N 6°40′W) by a Handley Page Hampden aircraft of 455 Squadron, Royal Australian Air Force with the loss of all 49 hands. |

== Unknown date ==
List of shipwrecks: Unknown date 1943
| Ship | State | Description |
|---|---|---|
| Carbet | France | World War II: The cargo ship was sunk off Piombino, Italy. |
| Krasnyl Oktyabr | Soviet Union | The cargo ship ran aground on or before 13 April in Cold Bay, Alaska Territory. She was refloated on 14 April with assistance from USS Ute (United States Navy). |
| HMS LCA 272 | Royal Navy | The landing craft, assault was lost sometime in April. |
| Nanshin Maru No. 2 | Imperial Japanese Navy | World War II: The requisitioned cargo ship was lost on or before 17 April after being torpedoed and damaged with the loss of twelve of her crew and fourteen gunners. The ship's mid section eventually drifted ashore on Formosa, China and was scrapped locally. |
| USS Pickerel | United States Navy | World War II: The Porpoise-class submarine was depth charged and sunk in the Pacific Ocean east of Honshu, Japan by Japanese forces sometime after 7 April with the loss of all 73 crew. |
| U-376 | Kriegsmarine | The Type VIIC submarine departed from La Pallice, Charente-Maritime, France on 6 April. No further trace, presumed lost in the Bay of Biscay with the loss of all 47 crew. |
| U-602 | Kriegsmarine | World War II: The Type VIIC submarine went missing for an unknown reason between 19 and 23 April on patrol in the Mediterranean Sea off Oran, Algeria with the loss of all 48 crew. |
