= German submarine U-563 =

German World War II submarine

Coordinates: 46°35′N 10°40′W

History

Nazi Germany
- Name: U-563
- Ordered: 24 October 1939
- Builder: Blohm & Voss, Hamburg
- Yard number: 539
- Laid down: 30 March 1940
- Launched: 5 February 1941
- Commissioned: 27 March 1941
- Fate: Sunk on 31 May 1943

General characteristics
- Class & type: Type VIIC submarine
- Displacement: 769 tonnes (757 long tons) surfaced; 871 t (857 long tons) submerged
- Length: 67.10 m (220 ft 2 in) o/a; 50.50 m (165 ft 8 in) pressure hull
- Beam: 6.20 m (20 ft 4 in) o/a; 4.70 m (15 ft 5 in) pressure hull
- Height: 9.60 m (31 ft 6 in)
- Draught: 4.74 m (15 ft 7 in)
- Installed power: 2,800–3,200 PS (2,100–2,400 kW; 2,800–3,200 bhp) (diesels); 750 PS (550 kW; 740 shp) (electric)
- Propulsion: 2 shafts; 2 × diesel engines; 2 × electric motors
- Speed: 17.7 knots (32.8 km/h; 20.4 mph) surfaced; 7.6 knots (14.1 km/h; 8.7 mph) submerged
- Range: 8,500 nmi (15,700 km; 9,800 mi) at 10 knots (19 km/h; 12 mph) surfaced; 80 nmi (150 km; 92 mi) at 4 knots (7.4 km/h; 4.6 mph) submerged
- Test depth: 230 m (750 ft); Crush depth: 250–295 m (820–968 ft)
- Complement: 4 officers, 40–56 enlisted
- Armament: 5 × 53.3 cm (21 in) torpedo tubes (four bow, one stern); 14 × torpedoes or 26 TMA mines; 1 × 8.8 cm (3.46 in) deck gun (220 rounds); 1 x 2 cm (0.79 in) C/30 AA gun

Service record
- Part of: 1st U-boat Flotilla; 27 March 1941 – 31 May 1943
- Identification codes: M 40 564
- Commanders: Oblt.z.S. Klaus Bargsten; 27 March 1941 – 15 March 1942; Kptlt. Gotz von Hartmann; 1 April 1942 – 16 May 1943; Oblt.z.S. Gustav Borchardt; 21 – 31 May 1943
- Operations: 8 patrols: 1st patrol: 31 July – 10 September 1941; 2nd patrol: 4 October – 1 November 1941; 3rd patrol: 29 November – 3 December 1941; 4th patrol: a. 21 January – 3 February 1942; b. 7 – 11 February 1942; c. 19 – 20 April 1942; 5th patrol: 1 October – 6 November 1942; 6th patrol: 9 December 1942 – 14 January 1943; 7th patrol: 20 March – 18 April 1943; 8th patrol: 29 – 31 May 1943
- Victories: 3 merchant ships sunk (14,689 GRT); 1 warship sunk (1,870 tons); 2 merchant ships damaged (16,266 GRT)

German submarine U-563 was a Type VIIC U-boat of Nazi Germany's Kriegsmarine during World War II. She carried out eight patrols and sank three ships, totalling 14,689 gross register tons (GRT), as well as one warship of 1,870 tons. Two ships were damaged, totalling 16,266 GRT. She was a member of nine wolfpacks, and was sunk by Allied aircraft in the Bay of Biscay on 31 May 1943.

== Design ==
German Type VIIC submarines were preceded by the shorter Type VIIB submarines. U-563 had a displacement of 769 tonnes (757 long tons) when at the surface and 871 tonnes (857 long tons) while submerged. She had a total length of 67.10 m (220 ft 2 in), a pressure hull length of 50.50 m (165 ft 8 in), a beam of 6.20 m (20 ft 4 in), a height of 9.60 m (31 ft 6 in), and a draught of 4.74 m (15 ft 7 in). The submarine was powered by two Germaniawerft F46 four-stroke, six-cylinder supercharged diesel engines producing a total of 2,800 to 3,200 metric horsepower (2,060 to 2,350 kW; 2,760 to 3,160 shp) for use while surfaced, two Brown, Boveri & Cie GG UB 720/8 double-acting electric motors producing a total of 750 metric horsepower (550 kW; 740 shp) for use while submerged. She had two shafts and two 1.23 m (4 ft) propellers. The boat was capable of operating at depths of up to 230 metres (750 ft).

The submarine had a maximum surface speed of 17.7 knots (32.8 km/h; 20.4 mph) and a maximum submerged speed of 7.6 knots (14.1 km/h; 8.7 mph). When submerged, the boat could operate for 80 nautical miles (150 km; 92 mi) at 4 knots (7.4 km/h; 4.6 mph); when surfaced, she could travel 8,500 nautical miles (15,700 km; 9,800 mi) at 10 knots (19 km/h; 12 mph). U-563 was fitted with five 53.3 cm (21 in) torpedo tubes (four fitted at the bow and one at the stern), fourteen torpedoes, one 8.8 cm (3.46 in) SK C/35 naval gun, 220 rounds, and a 2 cm (0.79 in) C/30 anti-aircraft gun. The boat had a complement of between forty-four and sixty.

== Service history ==
The submarine was laid down on 30 March 1940 at Blohm & Voss, Hamburg as yard number 539, launched on 5 February 1941 and commissioned on 27 March under the command of Oberleutnant zur See Klaus Bargsten.

She served with the 1st U-boat Flotilla from 27 March 1941 for training and stayed with that organization for operations.

=== First patrol ===
U-432's first patrol was from Kiel in Germany, she headed for the Atlantic Ocean via the gap separating the Faroe and Shetland Islands.

She arrived at Brest in occupied France on 10 September 1941.

=== Second patrol ===
Having left Brest on 4 October 1941, U-563 was unsuccessfully attacked by a Bristol Blenheim a day later west of Brittany.

She then sank the British destroyer HMS Cossack west of Gibraltar on 24 October 1941, but was attacked by another British ship, the corvette HMS Heliotrope west of Cape St. Vincent on the 25th. Although forced to submerge, the boat did not sustain any damage.

=== Third patrol ===
On 30 November 1941, U-563 was attacked by an Armstrong Whitworth Whitley of No. 502 Squadron RAF in the Bay of Biscay. The damage was serious enough that the submarine could not dive and the commander was wounded, obliging the boat to return to Germany for repairs.

=== Fourth and fifth patrols ===
For her fourth sortie, U-563 again put out into the Atlantic, sailing west of Ireland. She then turned northeast for the gap between the Faroe and Shetland Islands. She arrived at Bergen in Norway on 3 February 1942.

Her fifth patrol, following short trips to Hamburg and Kiel, was in many respects, her fourth outing in reverse – starting in Kiel and finishing in Brest.

=== Sixth patrol ===
She departed Brest on 9 December 1942 and sank the Bretalda about 330 nautical miles (610 km; 380 mi) west northwest of Cape Finisterre (northwest Spain) on the 18th. The boat returned to Brest on 14 January 1943.

=== Seventh patrol ===
U-563 was attacked by a Bristol Beaufighter on 22 March 1943 which caused only slight damage. The boat damaged the Sunoil with a torpedo on 5 April; this ship was subsequently sunk by U-530. U-563 was then attacked on the seventh by a B-24 Liberator of 86 Squadron. Damage was slight, but two men were lost when the submarine crash-dived.

On her most successful day, 12 April 1943, the boat sank the Pacific Grove and damaged the Fresno City southeast of Cape Farewell (Greenland). The Fresno City was sunk later that day by U-706. U-563 also sank the Dutch ship Ulysses in the same area.

=== Eighth patrol and loss ===
The boat left Brest for the last time on 29 May 1943. On the 31st, she was sunk by two British Handley Page Halifaxes of 58 Squadron and an Australian Sunderland flying boat of No. 10 Squadron RAAF and a Sunderland from No. 228 Squadron RAF.

Forty-nine men died with U-563;

=== Wolfpacks ===
U-563 took part in nine wolfpacks, namely:

- Grönland (10 – 23 August 1941)
- Kurfürst (23 August – 2 September 1941)
- Seewolf (2 – 7 September 1941)
- Breslau (4 – 29 October 1941)
- Panther (11 – 16 October 1942)
- Puma (16 – 29 October 1942)
- Falke (28 December 1942 – 5 January 1943)
- Löwenherz (1 – 10 April 1943)
- Lerche (10 – 16 April 1943)

== Summary of raiding history ==
Date	Ship Name	Nationality	Tonnage (Note: Merchant ship tonnages are in gross register tons. Military vessels are listed by tons displacement.)	Fate
24 October 1941	HMS Cossack	Royal Navy	1,870	Sunk
18 December 1942	Bretwalda	United Kingdom	4,906	Sunk
5 April 1943	Sunoil	United States	9,005	Damaged
12 April 1943	Fresno City	United Kingdom	7,261	Damaged
12 April 1943	Pacific Grove	United Kingdom	7,117	Sunk
12 April 1943	Ulysses	Netherlands	2,666	Sunk

== Bibliography ==
- Busch, Rainer; Röll, Hans-Joachim (1999). German U-boat commanders of World War II : a biographical dictionary. Translated by Brooks, Geoffrey. London, Annapolis, Md: Greenhill Books, Naval Institute Press. ISBN 1-55750-186-6.
- Busch, Rainer; Röll, Hans-Joachim (1999). Der U-Boot-Krieg, 1939-1945: Deutsche U-Boot-Verluste von September 1939 bis Mai 1945 [German U-boat losses from September 1939 to May 1945] (in German). Vol. IV. Hamburg, Berlin, Bonn: Mittler. ISBN 3-8132-0514-2.
- Gröner, Eric; Jung, Dieter; Maass, Martin (1991). German Warships 1815-1945: U-boats and Mine Warfare Vessels. Vol. 2. Translated by Thomas, Keith; Magowan, Rachel. London: Conway Maritime Press. ISBN 0-85177-593-4.
- Kemp, Paul (1997). U-Boats Destroyed – German Submarine Losses in the World Wars. Arms & Armour. ISBN 1-85409-515-3.
