= K25 =

K25 or K-25 may refer to:

- K-25, a Manhattan Project uranium enrichment facility in Oak Ridge, Tennessee
- K-25 (Kansas highway)
- .k25, a raw image file format
- HMS Azalea (K25), a British Royal Navy ship
- K25, a grant awarded by the National Institutes of Health
- K-25, a Soviet copy of the AIM-7 Sparrow air-to-air missile
