= German submarine U-530 =

German World War II submarine

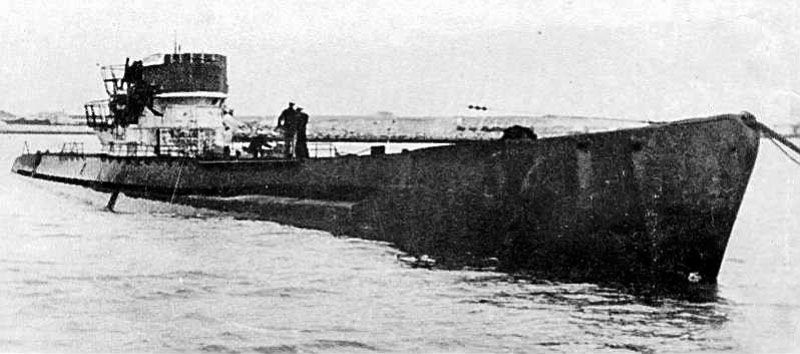
- U-530 after her surrender at Mar del Plata Naval Base

History

Nazi Germany
- Name: U-530
- Ordered: 15 August 1940
- Builder: Deutsche Werft AG, Hamburg-Finkenwerder
- Yard number: 345
- Laid down: 8 December 1941
- Launched: 28 July 1942
- Commissioned: 14 October 1942
- Fate: Surrendered in Mar del Plata, Argentina on 10 July 1945; Sunk during torpedo tests on 28 November 1947 by submarine USS Toro

General characteristics
- Class & type: Type IXC/40 submarine
- Displacement: 1,144 t (1,126 long tons) surfaced; 1,257 t (1,237 long tons) submerged
- Length: 76.76 m (251 ft 10 in) o/a; 58.75 m (192 ft 9 in) pressure hull
- Beam: 6.86 m (22 ft 6 in) o/a; 4.44 m (14 ft 7 in) pressure hull
- Height: 9.60 m (31 ft 6 in)
- Draught: 4.67 m (15 ft 4 in)
- Installed power: 4,400 PS (3,200 kW; 4,300 bhp) (diesels); 1,000 PS (740 kW; 990 shp) (electric)
- Propulsion: 2 shafts; 2 × diesel engines; 2 × electric motors
- Speed: 18.3 knots (33.9 km/h; 21.1 mph) surfaced; 7.3 knots (13.5 km/h; 8.4 mph) submerged
- Range: 13,850 nmi (25,650 km; 15,940 mi) at 10 knots (19 km/h; 12 mph) surfaced; 63 nmi (117 km; 72 mi) at 4 knots (7.4 km/h; 4.6 mph) submerged
- Test depth: 230 m (750 ft)
- Complement: 4 officers, 44 enlisted
- Sensors & processing systems: FuMO-61 Hohentwiel U; FuMB-26 Tunis
- Armament: 6 × torpedo tubes (4 bow, 2 stern); 22 × 53.3 cm (21 in) torpedoes; 1 × 10.5 cm (4.1 in) SK C/32 deck gun (180 rounds); 1 × 3.7 cm (1.5 in) SK C/30 AA gun; 1 × twin 2 cm FlaK 30 AA guns

Service record
- Part of: 4th U-boat Flotilla; 14 October 1942 – 28 February 1943; 10th U-boat Flotilla; 1 March 1943 – 30 September 1944; 33rd U-boat Flotilla; 1 October 1944 – 8 May 1945
- Identification codes: M 49 518
- Commanders: Kptlt. Kurt Lange; 14 October 1942 – January 1945; Oblt.z.S.. Otto Wermuth; January – 10 July 1945
- Operations: 7 patrols: 1st patrol: 20 February – 22 April 1943; 2nd patrol: a. 29 May – 3 July 1943; b. 21 September 1943; 3rd patrol: 27 – 29 September 1943; 4th patrol: 3 – 5 October 1943; 5th patrol: 17 October 1943 – 22 February 1944; 6th patrol: a. 22 May – 4 October 1944; b. 19 – 23 February 1945; 7th patrol: 3 March – 10 July 1945
- Victories: 2 merchant ships sunk (12,063 GRT); 1 merchant ship damaged (10,195 GRT)

German submarine U-530 was a Type IXC/40 U-boat of Nazi Germany's Kriegsmarine during World War II. She was laid down at the Deutsche Werft in Hamburg on 8 December 1941 as yard number 345, launched on 28 July 1942 and commissioned on 14 October 1942 with Kapitänleutnant Kurt Lange in command, who led her in six patrols. Lange was replaced in January 1945 by Oberleutnant zur See Otto Wermuth, who led her to surrender in Mar del Plata, Argentina, on 10 July 1945, two months after the end of WWII in Europe.

The submarine's voyage to Argentina led to various legends, apocryphal stories and conspiracy theories. These allege that it and/or U-977, which surrendered on 17 August 1945, might have sunk the Brazilian cruiser Bahia, transported escaping Nazi leaders (such as Adolf Hitler, somehow alive) and/or Nazi gold to South America, and/or voyaged to Antarctica. The U-boat and its crew were transported to the United States, where the former was sunk as a target with a torpedo on 28 November 1947.

== Design ==
German Type IXC/40 submarines were slightly larger than the original Type IXCs. U-530 was powered by two MAN M 9 V 40/46 supercharged four-stroke, nine-cylinder diesel engines for surface propulsion and two Siemens-Schuckert 2 GU 345/34 double-acting electric motors for submerged propulsion. She had two shafts and two 1.92 m (6 ft) propellers.

The boat had 48 crew.

=== Sensors ===
==== Radar ====
U-530 was one of the few U-boats that was fitted with a FuMO 61 Hohentwiel U Radar Transmitter. It was installed on the starboard side of the conning tower.

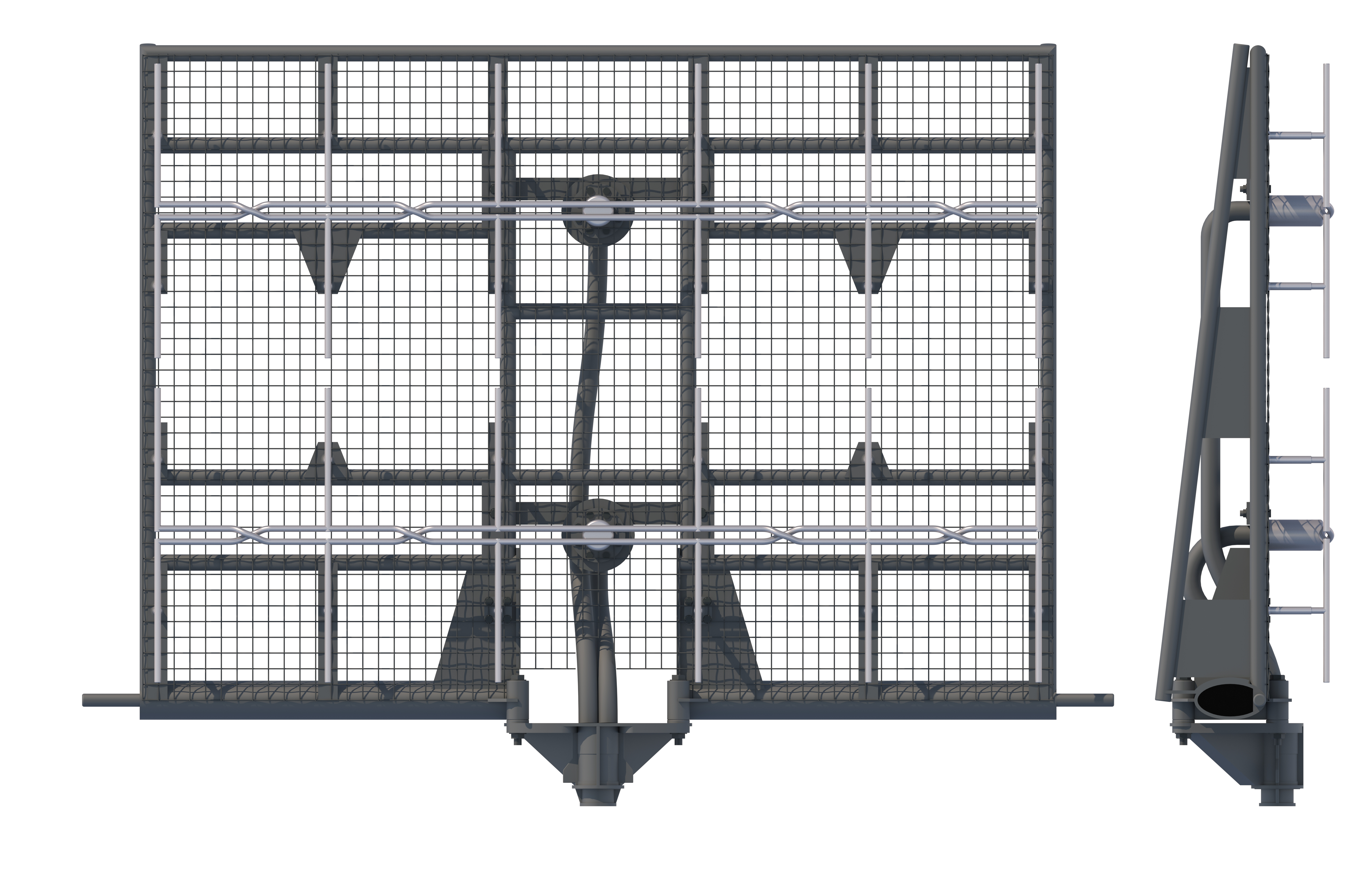
FuMO-61 Hohentwiel U Radar Transmitter

==== Radar detection ====
U-530 was fitted with the FuMB-26 Tunis antenne. The FuMB 26 Tunis combined the FuMB Ant. 24 Fliege and FuMB Ant. 25 Cuba II antennas. It could be mounted in either a direction finder antenna loop or separately on the bridge.

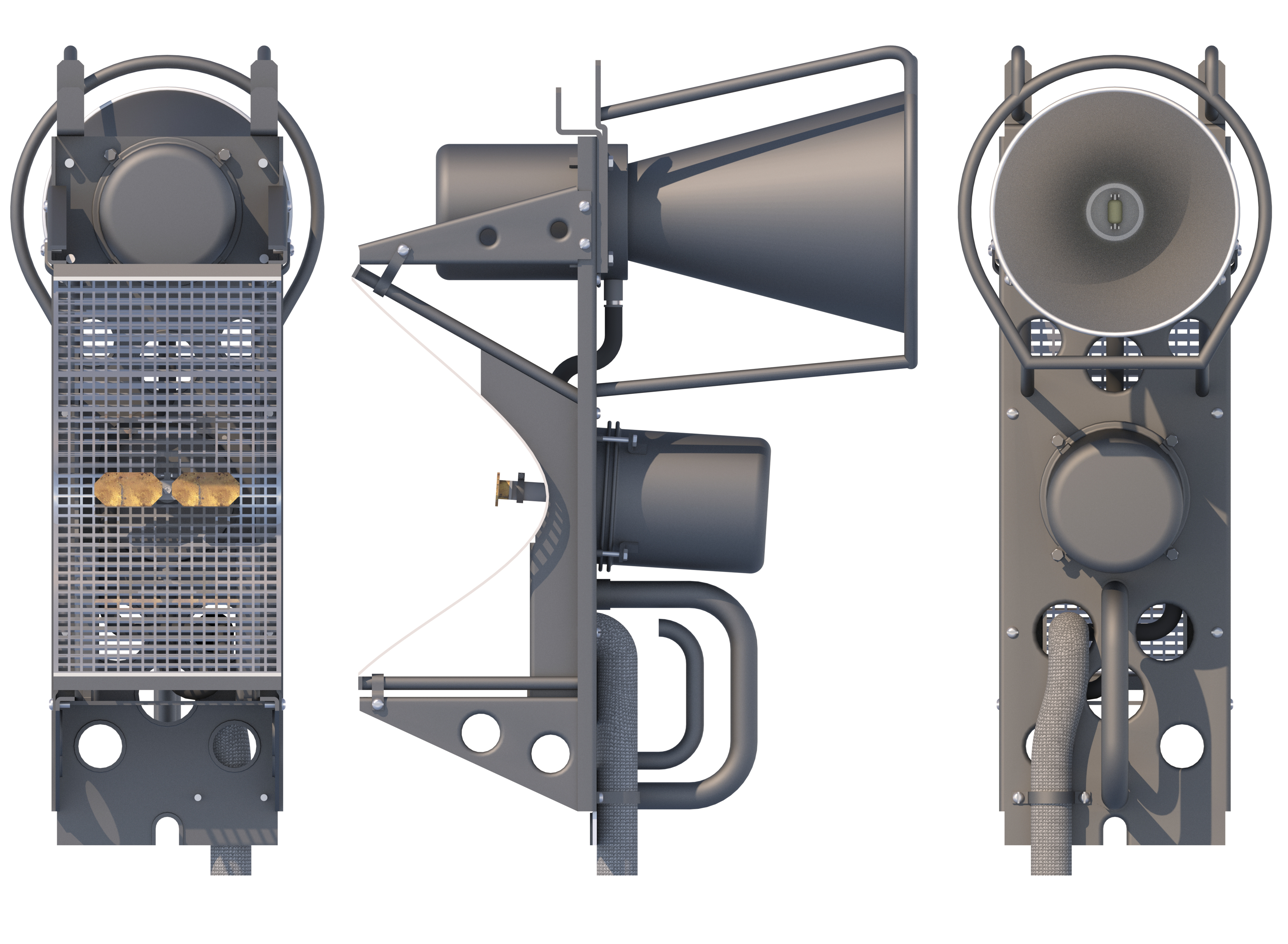
FuMB-26 Tunis Radar Detection.

== Service history ==
She served with the 4th U-boat Flotilla while training, then the 10th flotilla from 1 March 1943 to 30 September 1944 and the 33rd flotilla from 1 October 1944 to 8 May 1945. U-530 completed seven war patrols, sinking two ships totalling 12,063 gross register tons (GRT) and damaging another of 10,195 GRT. She surrendered in Mar del Plata, Buenos Aires Province, Argentina, on 10 July 1945.

=== First patrol ===
The submarine left Kiel on her first patrol on 20 February 1943. Her route to the Atlantic took her through the gap between Iceland and the Faeroe Islands. On 9 March U-530 sank the Swedish freighter Milos in mid-Atlantic, at a point roughly equidistant from the southern tip of Greenland, Iceland and northwest Scotland. Later she finished off the American Sunoil on 5 April after the tanker had already been hit by U-563. U-530 then made her way to the port of Lorient in occupied France, arriving on 22 April.

=== Second, third and fourth patrols ===
These three forays were relatively uneventful, apart from her home port being moved to Bordeaux and then La Pallice.

=== Fifth patrol ===
Her fifth patrol took her to the Caribbean Sea where she attacked and damaged the American tanker Chapultepec on 26 December 1943. U-530 was forced to return to France when she was rammed by the tanker Esso Buffalo on 29 December. She arrived at Lorient on 22 February 1944.

=== Sixth patrol ===
For her sixth sortie, U-530 departed Lorient on 22 May 1944 ultimately for operations in the Trinidad area. On her outward voyage she was to rendezvous with the I-52 and supply the larger boat with a Naxos radar detector, a radar operator and a German navigator to help I-52 complete her journey.

The two submarines rendezvoused on 23 June in mid-Atlantic, 850 nmi (1,570 km; 980 mi) west of the Cape Verde Islands. The Allies had been informed of the rendezvous and directed the escort carrier Bogue (CVE-9) to the scene; her aircraft managed to sink I-52 with an acoustic torpedo. U-530 returned to base, this time Flensburg, after 133 days at sea.

A short journey from Kiel to Horten Naval Base in southern Norway on from 19 to 23 February was her recorded next move, but it did not count as a patrol.

=== Seventh patrol and surrender ===
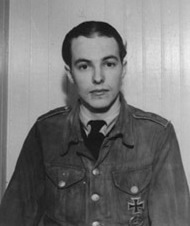
Wermuth after his surrender in Argentina

U-530 departed Horten, Norway, on 3 March 1945 to operate off New York, in station as close as two or three miles off Long Island. On about 4 May, the submarine sighted a convoy and attacked with three torpedoes: two missed while the third had a battery explosion and did not leave the tube. U-530 attacked a second convoy 6 May with five torpedoes and a third the next day with two more, all of which missed. (Note: ONI notes that convoys HX 534, UC65A, and ON 298 were in the area on the dates in question, with HX 534 and ON 298 badly scattered by fog. None reported any submarine contacts.) When Germany surrendered on 8 May, U-530 was reputedly 1,000 miles (1,600 km) east-northeast of Puerto Rico. Germany ordered its U-boats to surrender at the nearest United Nations port, but the captain of U-530, Oberleutnant Otto Wermuth, said he thought this was an enemy trick. He headed for Argentina, thinking his crew would receive better treatment there (as had many fleeing Nazis), unaware that the country had also declared war on Germany. The crew dumped the five remaining torpedoes, (Note: While Type IXC/40 U-boats could nominally carry 24 torpedoes, in practice this varied, particularly as external canisters were removed/not used late in the war. U-530 departed on patrol with 14 torpedoes, eight G7e T3a electric torpedoes and six G7e T5 homing torpedoes.) anti-aircraft gun ammunition, secret books, and the ship's log overboard. The submarine passed east of Bermuda, reputedly crossing the equator in mid-June 1945. Wermuth said he thought about surrendering at Miramar, Buenos Aires, prior to proceeding to Mar del Plata.

U-530 finally surrendered to the Argentine Navy on 10 July 1945. Wermuth was unspecific about routes used and could not explain why it had taken two months to reach the port, why the crew had no identification, or why they had sunk the ship's log and deck gun. (Note: Interrogation reports of the Captain Wermuth U-530 crew do not mention the 105 mm deck gun, listing only the 37 mm and two twin 20 mm. Late in WWII these were regularly removed from U-boats and some completed without guns at all, and it is not clear if U-530 lost her deck gun in a prior refit. The US Naval Attache's report on Captain Wermuth's interrogation report does include "parts of the 37 mm gun" among the items dumped overboard.) Wermuth stated that the U-boat had transported no people or treasure prior to its surrender and that he did not know of any other submarines coming to Argentina.

The Argentine Ministry of the Navy issued an official communique stating that U-530 did not sink the Brazilian cruiser Bahia (as suspected by one Brazilian admiral), that U-530 had landed no high-profile Nazi official on the coast of Argentina before surrendering, and that no high-ranking Wehrmacht officials were aboard. The crew was interned and transferred, along with the boat, to the United States. The submarine was sunk as a target on 28 November 1947 by a torpedo from American submarine USS Toro.

Another Brazilian admiral suspected that U-530 had come from Japan. U-977, which surrendered at Mar del Plata on 17 August 1945 (its papers intact), was also accused of sinking Bahia, but an inquiry eventually found that the cruiser had been sunk due to a gunnery accident during drills on 4 July 1945.

Additionally, by 23 July 1945, an Argentine reporter claimed that he had seen a Buenos Aires provincial police report implying the submarine had surfaced off the Argentine coast and landed a high-ranking officer and a civilian who might have been the disguised Adolf Hitler and Eva Braun, both somehow still alive. The U.S. Federal Bureau of Investigation similarly documented a lead claiming that a self-proclaimed Argentine refugee said he had met Hitler upon his arrival in one of two U-boats that supposedly surfaced at the tip of Valdés Peninsula in May 1945. (Note: The same source alleged that the reason German forces defended the Channel Islands beyond V-E Day was to allow Hitler's escape from one of those ports.)

U-977's captain, Heinz Schäffer, wrote in his 1952 book that an Anglo-American commission to Argentina accused him of helping Hitler escape, which he denied. Schäffer states that he and Wermuth first met in mid-1945 when introduced by U.S. authorities. Schäffer cited U-977's intact navigational logs as absolving his own crew, while asserting U-530's innocence on the incorrect basis of its surrendering before Hitler's death. (Note: Schäffer also states that U-530 landed in Argentina before the Bahia sank, which occurred days earlier.)

== Summary of raiding history ==
| Date | Ship Name | Nationality | Tonnage (GRT) | Fate |
|---|---|---|---|---|
| 9 March 1943 | Milos | Sweden | 3,058 | Sunk |
| 5 April 1943 | Sunoil | United States | 9,005 | Sunk |
| 26 December 1943 | Chapultepec | United States | 10,195 | Damaged |

== See also ==
- Argentina during World War II

== Bibliography ==
- Busch, Rainer; Röll, Hans-Joachim (1999). German U-boat commanders of World War II : a biographical dictionary. Translated by Brooks, Geoffrey. London, Annapolis, Md: Greenhill Books, Naval Institute Press. ISBN 1-55750-186-6.
- Busch, Rainer; Röll, Hans-Joachim (1999). Deutsche U-Boot-Verluste von September 1939 bis Mai 1945 [German U-boat losses from September 1939 to May 1945]. Der U-Boot-Krieg (in German). Vol. IV. Hamburg, Berlin, Bonn: Mittler. ISBN 3-8132-0514-2.
- Gröner, Erich; Jung, Dieter; Maass, Martin (1991). U-boats and Mine Warfare Vessels. German Warships 1815–1945. Vol. 2. Translated by Thomas, Keith; Magowan, Rachel. London: Conway Maritime Press. ISBN 0-85177-593-4.
- Los Verdaderos Últimos Días de la Segunda Guerra Mundial, Parte II: "La verdad sobre la llegada de sumergiles alemanes a la Argentina". Julio B. Mutti, HistoryBook 2013, ISBN 978-987-29109-1-4
