= USS Toro =

Submarine of the United States

- USS Toro (SS-422)

History

United States
- Builder: Portsmouth Naval Shipyard, Kittery, Maine
- Laid down: 27 May 1944
- Launched: 23 August 1944
- Commissioned: 8 December 1944
- Decommissioned: 2 February 1946
- Recommissioned: 13 May 1947
- Decommissioned: 11 March 1963
- Stricken: 1 April 1963
- Fate: Sold for scrap, April 1965

General characteristics
- Class & type: Tench-class diesel-electric submarine
- Displacement: 1,570 tons (1,595 t) surfaced; 2,414 tons (2,453 t) submerged
- Length: 311 ft 8 in (95.00 m)
- Beam: 27 ft 4 in (8.33 m)
- Draft: 17 ft (5.2 m) maximum
- Propulsion: 4 × Fairbanks-Morse Model 38D8-⅛ 10-cylinder opposed piston diesel engines driving electrical generators; 2 × 126-cell Sargo batteries; 2 × low-speed direct-drive Elliott electric motors; two propellers; 5,400 shp (4.0 MW) surfaced; 2,740 shp (2.0 MW) submerged
- Speed: 20.25 knots (38 km/h) surfaced; 8.75 knots (16 km/h) submerged
- Range: 11,000 nautical miles (20,000 km) surfaced at 10 knots (19 km/h)
- Endurance: 48 hours at 2 knots (3.7 km/h) submerged; 75 days on patrol
- Test depth: 400 ft (120 m)
- Complement: 10 officers, 71 enlisted
- Armament: 10 × 21-inch (533 mm) torpedo tubes; (6 forward, 4 aft); 28 torpedoes; 1 × 5-inch (127 mm) / 25 caliber deck gun; Bofors 40 mm and Oerlikon 20 mm cannon

USS Toro (hull number SS-422), a Tench-class submarine, was the only ship of the United States Navy to be named for the toro, a name applied to various fish including the cowfish, the catalufa, and the cavallo.

== Construction and commissioning ==
Toro′s keel was laid down on 27 May 1944 at the Portsmouth Navy Yard in Kittery, Maine. She was launched on 23 August 1944, sponsored by Mrs. Alan G. Kirk, and commissioned on 8 December 1944.

== First War Patrol ==
Following her completion on 26 December 1944, Toro participated in training exercises out of Portsmouth, New Hampshire, Newport, Rhode Island, and New London, Connecticut, before arriving at Key West, Florida, on 11 February 1945. She provided services to the Fleet Sonar School, then, on 28 February, departed Key West in company with submarine Bumper (SS-333), bound for the Panama Canal Zone where she underwent a week of intensive training. The two submarines set a westward course for Hawaii on 15 March and arrived at Pearl Harbor on 1 April. Toro conducted training exercises out of that port with Submarine Division 101 until 24 April when she departed Oahu in company with submarine Billfish (SS-286). She arrived at Saipan on 6 May and, after one false start, got underway for her first war patrol on 10 May.

After arriving in her patrol and lifeguard area south of Shikoku and east of Kyūshū on 16 May, she occasionally encountered Japanese planes as she pursued her duties. On 18 May, following a probable periscope sighting, Toro detected a transmission on Japanese submarine radar frequency and attempted to close the contact but was unsuccessful.

As she patrolled Bungo Suido, she was often assigned as lifeguard for air strikes against the Japanese islands. While off Omino Shima before sunrise on 25 May, she received word that a B-29 Superfortress was in trouble. She began the search in state four seas with only fair visibility and, two hours after dawn, homed in by friendly air cover, she rescued two Army aviators who had been floating in their lifejackets for three and one-half hours. Twenty minutes later, she rescued another aviator and then continued her search for additional survivors until late in the day. The names of the three airmen were Charles Smith, Howard Stein, and Robert Canova. While patrolling on the surface on the following morning, she made radar contact with a possible target at 2,000 yards (1,800 m). The submarine turned toward the contact and shortly thereafter a torpedo wake crossed her bow, indicating that an enemy vessel had first located her. Toro dove and had no further contact with the unseen attacker. Toro continued patrols and lifeguard duty in Bungo Suido until 14 June when she set her course for the Mariana Islands. She moored at Apra Harbor five days later.

== Second War Patrol ==
Following refit by submarine tender Fulton (AS-11), Toro got underway from Guam on 14 July; paused briefly at Saipan for fuel, water, and the replacement of her torpedoes with Mark 18s; and arrived in her patrol area south of Shikoku on 24 July. Late in the day, she was drawn far out of her assigned area in a fruitless search for a downed flier. The departure of Toro’s air cover at 18:00 left her in a most dangerous situation due to the expected passage of an American task force on an antishipping sweep. Unable to clear the area in time, Toro made radar contact with the task force at 20:55. Despite attempts to establish her identity, Toro was soon the target of two obviously unfriendly American ships which bore down on her at a speed of 22 knots (41 km/h). The destroyer USS Colahan (DD-658) opened gunfire and bracketed Toro with her first salvo at a distance of 7,400 yards (6,767 m). Toro crash-dived and attempted to establish her identity using a flare, smoke bombs, and sonar, but the ships were still firing when she passed 150 feet (46 m). She continued down to 400 feet (120 m) and rigged for depth charges. The surface vessels, thinking that Colahan had sunk a Japanese picket boat, remained in the area for half an hour searching for survivors without discovering that their target had been a friendly submarine. At 01:00 on 25 July, Toro surfaced and set her course back to her patrol area.

That morning, she returned to her lifeguard station and, in the afternoon, rescued three British aviators afloat on a raft. She maintained her station for carrier strikes against Japan on 28 July and, shortly after noon on 30 July, received a distress message from a United States Army Air Corps P-51 Mustang plane. After circling his plane over the submarine the pilot parachuted from the crippled aircraft at an altitude of only 800 feet (240 m). Within seven minutes, Toro’s crew brought the aviator on board.

She transferred the rescued British fliers to submarine Gabilan (SS-252) on 1 August. On 5 August, while patrolling her lifeguard area for planes returning from bomber raids on the Japanese islands, Toro sighted dense black smoke on the horizon and, receiving reports of a downed pilot in the area, put on all possible speed to investigate the source of the smoke. Less than 20 minutes later, she picked up an Army aviator afloat in his lifeboat impressively marked by a smoke display. Minutes later, a second Army aviator jumped from his plane nearby, and again Toro had a flier on board within seven minutes of the time his parachute opened.

== Post-World War II service ==
Toro sinking U-530, November 1947

At mid-month, Japan capitulated. After destroying a number of naval mines south of Honshū, the submarine departed the area on 17 August and proceeded via Guam to Midway Island where she arrived on 27 August.

On 4 September, she departed Midway and proceeded via Pearl Harbor and the Panama Canal to east coast ports. She arrived at Philadelphia, Pennsylvania, on 31 October to prepare for inactivation. In January 1946, the rescue tug ATR-67 towed the submarine to Atlantic Reserve Fleet, New London, where on 7 February 1946, Toro was decommissioned and placed in reserve.

Toro was recommissioned on 13 May 1947, and she reported for duty to Submarine Squadron 2, Atlantic Fleet, on 28 May. She conducted hunter/killer exercises, made a simulated war patrol in the Arctic Sea, and joined fleet tactical exercises in the Mediterranean Sea.

On 28 November 1947, Toro sunk, as a target, the captured German submarine U-530 with a torpedo. In July 1945, after the surrender of Nazi Germany, the crew of the U-530 were interned when it surrendered in Argentina. The crew and the boat were then transferred to the United States.

On 28 January 1950, Toro joined Submarine Development Group 2, and her operations helped to refine submarine tactics, weapons, and equipment. She worked in the Atlantic Ocean and Caribbean Sea until July 1952, when she reported to Submarine Squadron 2 at New London and assumed new duties training submariners. During the next ten years, she combined these activities with type training and services to ships and aircraft engaged in antisubmarine warfare exercises. She also participated in Operation Springboard and made one Mediterranean cruise. She was redesignated an auxiliary submarine with hull classification symbol AGSS in July 1962 and, on 22 November 1962, as her Navy career drew to its close, she made her 11,000th dive while operating in Long Island Sound.

In February 1963, she was ordered to berth with the Philadelphia Group, Atlantic Reserve Fleet, for demilitarization and non-industrial stripping; on 11 March 1963 she was decommissioned, and on 1 April 1963 her name was struck from the Naval Vessel Register.

=== USS Thresher role ===
She was slated to be sunk near the lost submarine Thresher (SSN-593) in an attempt to understand the currents near the wreck location but the plan was abandoned, and Toro was later sold and scrapped. Her name plate is on display at the Freedom Park.

== Awards ==
- American Campaign Medal
- Asiatic-Pacific Campaign Medal with two battle stars
- World War II Victory Medal
- Navy Occupation Service Medal
- National Defense Service Medal with star
