= USS Scorpion (SS-278) =

Submarine of the United States

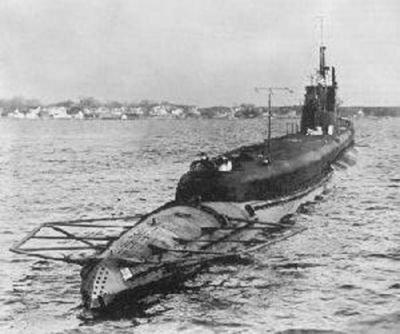
- Stern view of USS Scorpion (SS-278) off Portsmouth Navy Yard, Kittery, Maine, ca. July 1942–February 1943.

History

United States
- Name: USS Scorpion
- Namesake: scorpion
- Builder: Portsmouth Naval Shipyard, Kittery, Maine
- Laid down: 20 March 1942
- Launched: 20 July 1942
- Sponsored by: Ms. Elizabeth T. Monagle
- Commissioned: 1 October 1942
- Honors and awards: 3 Battle Stars
- Fate: Probably mined in the Yellow Sea after 5 January 1944

General characteristics
- Class & type: Gato-class diesel-electric submarine
- Displacement: 1,525 long tons (1,549 t) surfaced; 2,424 long tons (2,463 t) submerged
- Length: 311 ft 9 in (95.02 m)
- Beam: 27 ft 3 in (8.31 m)
- Draft: 17 ft (5.2 m) maximum
- Propulsion: 4 × Fairbanks-Morse Model 38D8-⅛ 9-cylinder opposed piston diesel engines driving electrical generators; 2 × 126-cell Sargo batteries; 4 × high-speed General Electric electric motors with reduction gears; two propellers; 5,400 shp (4.0 MW) surfaced; 2,740 shp (2.0 MW) submerged
- Speed: 21 kn (24 mph; 39 km/h) surfaced; 9 kn (10 mph; 17 km/h) submerged
- Range: 11,000 nmi (13,000 mi; 20,000 km) surfaced at 10 kn (12 mph; 19 km/h)
- Endurance: 48 hours at 2 kn (2.3 mph; 3.7 km/h) submerged; 75 days on patrol
- Test depth: 300 ft (91 m)
- Complement: 6 officers, 54 enlisted
- Armament: 10 × 21-inch (533 mm) torpedo tubes; 6 forward, 4 aft; 24 torpedoes; 1 × 3-inch (76 mm) / 50 caliber deck gun; Bofors 40 mm and Oerlikon 20 mm cannon

USS Scorpion (SS-278) – a Gato-class submarine – was the fifth ship of the United States Navy to be named for the scorpion.

== Construction and commissioning ==
Scorpion′s keel was laid down at the Portsmouth Navy Yard at Kittery, Maine, on 20 March 1942. She was launched on 20 July 1942, sponsored by Ms. Elizabeth T. Monagle, and commissioned on 1 October 1942.

== Service history ==
Following further yard work and fitting out, Scorpion conducted shakedown operations off the southern New England coast in January 1943 and sailed for Panama in late February. In mid-March she transited the Panama Canal and headed toward Pearl Harbor, Hawaii. On an unrecorded date while she was on the surface at about the midpoint of her voyage from the Panama Canal Zone to Pearl Harbor, she encountered an Allied merchant ship which mistook her for a Japanese submarine and opened gunfire on her despite her efforts to identify herself. The merchant ship's shells landed wide of Scorpion, and she proceeded with no damage or casualties. She arrived at Pearl Harbor on 24 March 1943. There she underwent modifications which included the installation of a bathythermograph, a then-new oceanographic instrument to enable her to locate and hide in thermal layers that minimized the effectiveness of sonar equipment.

On 5 April, Scorpion departed Pearl Harbor for her first war patrol, a hunting and mining mission off the east coast of Honshū. On 19 April, she reached the mining area near Nakaminato. During the afternoon she reconnoitered the coast and in the evening she laid her naval mines, then retired to deep water. On 20 April, she sank her first enemy ship – a 1,934 long tons (1,965 t) converted gunboat, Meiji Maru No.1. On 21 April, prior to 01:00, she fired on and destroyed her first sampan in surface action, then moved up the coast to observe the fishing grounds, shipping lanes, and coastline of the Shioya Saki area. On the night of 22 April, she destroyed three more sampans with gunfire and continued north toward Kinkasan To.

With the absence of shipping along the coastal lanes, she moved seaward and on 27 April sighted a convoy of four freighters escorted by a destroyer. At 04:59, she launched four torpedoes at the first and largest merchantman; two at the second; then dived and rigged for depth charging. At 05:05, the destroyer dropped her first depth charges. A half-hour later, the Japanese warship broke off her search for Scorpion to aid the stricken passenger-cargo ship. While Scorpion escaped with slight damage, the 6,380 long tons (6,482 t) merchant vessel Yuzan Maru sank.

On 28 April, Scorpion received orders home. En route on 29 April, she sighted and engaged a 100 long tons (102 t) patrol vessel, which she left burning to the waterline. On the morning of 30 April she stalked, fired on, and finally torpedoed and sank a 600 long tons (610 t) patrol ship Ebisu Maru No.5. During the 105-minute fight, however, Scorpion received her first casualty. Lt. Cdr. R. M. Raymond – on board as prospective commanding officer – was hit and killed by gunfire.

Soon after the patrol vessel went down, an enemy plane appeared. Scorpion submerged, survived the plane's depth charges and continued toward Midway Atoll and Pearl Harbor, arriving on 8 May.

With a 4 in (100 mm)/50 gun in place of her 3 in (76 mm)/50 gun, Scorpion set out on her second war patrol on 29 May. On 2 June, she refueled at Midway, and on 21 June she arrived off Takara Jima in the Tokara Gunto. For the next week, she searched for targets in that archipelago in an effort to disrupt shipping on the Formosa-Nagasaki routes. On 28 June, she shifted her hunt to the Yellow Sea and, by 30 June, was off the Shantung Peninsula. On 3 July, she sighted a five-freighter convoy with one escort making its way through the eastern waters of that sea. By 09:55, she had sent torpedoes toward the convoy and dived. As the depth charging began, she struck bottom at 150 ft (46 m). Two charges exploded close by. Between 10:02 and 10:06, five more shook her hull. Fearing that she was stirring up a mud trail, the commander ordered her screws stopped and she settled on the bottom at 174 ft (53 m). At 10:08, a chain or cable was dragged over her hull. Four minutes later, her hull was scraped a second time. Immediately underway again, she began evasive course changes and escaped further exploding charges. The hunt continued for over an hour; and at 11:49, Scorpion came to periscope depth; spied the destroyer 7,000 yd (6,400 m) off; and cleared the area. Postwar examination of Japanese records show that Scorpion scored five hits, and sank a 3,890 long tons (3,952 t) freighter – the Anzan Maru – and a 6,112 long tons (6,210 t) passenger-cargo ship – the Kokuryu Maru.

Because of damage received during the depth charging, Scorpion retraced her route through Tokara Gunto; underwent a bomber attack east of Akuseki Jima; and continued on to Midway. On 26 July, she arrived back at Pearl Harbor, underwent repairs, conducted training exercises, and, on 13 October, departed Pearl Harbor for her third war patrol. After touching at Midway on 17 October, she headed for the Mariana Islands, where she reconnoitered Pagan Island and Agrihan Island on 25–26 October, and Farallon de Pajoras on 1–2 November. On the last date, she struck an uncharted pinnacle; but suffering no apparent damage, continued her patrol. On 3 November, she was off Maug; and, two days later, she sighted her first target, a Mogami-class heavy cruiser. Squalls interfered, however, and she abandoned the target after a four-hour chase. On 7 November, she was back off Agrihan; and on 8 November, she closed with a freighter, which turned and gave chase. The freighter was a Q-ship, a warship disguised as a merchantman. Unable to regain the advantage, Scorpion retired.

Poor weather continued to plague the submarine's hunting until, on 13 November, she sighted a freighter and a tanker escorted by three warships. Firing her torpedoes, she scored on the oiler, which went dead in the water; the Shiretoko was damaged. One of the escorts dropped depth charges, then rejoined the formation. On 14 November, Scorpion patrolled near Rota; and, on 15 November, she watched for targets off Saipan.

For the next week, the submarine continued to work the shipping lanes of the Marianas without success. Heavy seas and squalls continued to shelter enemy traffic. On 22 November, she sighted a transport accompanied by two destroyers and a corvette. She stalked the formation for 16 hours but was unable to fire. A few hours later, low on fuel, she headed home.

Departing Pearl Harbor on 29 December, Scorpion stopped at Midway to top off with fuel, and left that place on 3 January 1944 to conduct her fourth war patrol. Her assigned area was in the northern East China Sea and Yellow Sea. Her last commander was Lt. Cdr. Maximilian Gmelich Schmidt.

On the morning of 5 January, Scorpion reported that one of her crew members sustained a fractured foot via dropping a crate of oranges on it during the restocking of inventories in high seas. The Scorpion requested a rendezvous with Herring which was returning from patrol and was near her. The rendezvous was accomplished on that afternoon. "Scorpion reports case under control." Scorpion was never seen or heard from again after her departure from that rendezvous and reported "sunk and lost at sea". On 16 February, Steelhead and Scorpion were warned that they were close together, and that an enemy submarine was in the vicinity.

No Japanese information indicates that the loss of Scorpion was the result of an enemy anti-submarine attack. There were, however, several mine lines across the entrance to the Yellow Sea. The presence of these mine lines and the "restricted area" bounding them was discovered from captured Japanese Notices to Mariners at a much later date. In the meantime, several submarines had made patrols in this area, crossing and recrossing the mine lines without incident, and coming safely home. It is probable that these mine lines were very thin, offering only about a 10% threat to submarines at maximum, and steadily decreasing in effectiveness with the passage of time. Scorpion was lost soon after these mines were laid, at a time when they were the greatest threat. She could have been an operational casualty, but her area consisted of water shallow enough so that it might be expected that some men would have survived. Since there are no known survivors, the most reasonable assumption is that she hit a mine.

== Awards ==
Scorpion earned three battle stars for her World War II service.
