= Landing Craft Gun =

1943 class of British landing craft

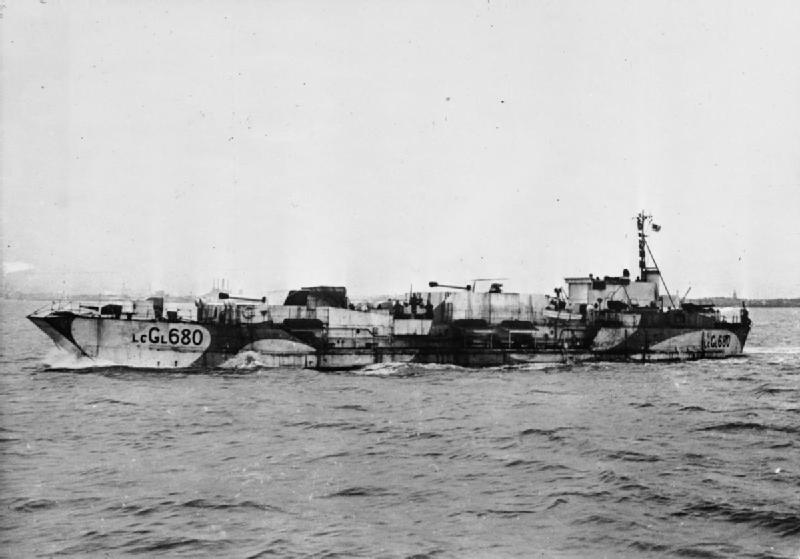
- Landing Craft, Gun (Large) 680

Class overview
- Name: Landing Craft, Gun
- Builders: John I. Thornycroft Ltd.
- Operators: Royal Navy; United States Navy

General characteristics LCG(L) Mark III
- Type: Landing craft support
- Displacement: 500 long tons (508 t)
- Length: 192 ft (59 m)
- Beam: 31 ft (9.4 m)
- Draught: 3 ft 6 in (1.07 m) forward, 6 ft 0 in (1.83 m) aft
- Propulsion: 2 x Paxman 500 hp. Diesels, twin screws.
- Speed: 10.5 knots (19.4 km/h; 12.1 mph) maximum
- Range: 2,700 miles at 9 knots
- Crew: 15 (2 officers, 13 sailors) + 23 (1 officer, 2 NCOs, 20 marines for gun crew)
- Armament: 2 x 4.7-inch QF Naval guns; 2 x 20-mm or; 2 x QF 2-pdr "pom-pom"s.
- Armour: 25-lb. DIHT plating for gun deck sides, blast screens, and sides of magazines

Landing Craft, Gun (LCG) is an umbrella term referring to two major types of British-built landing craft used extensively in World War II, present for the Normandy landings (Operation Neptune), the Allied invasion of Sicily, Operation Infatuate, and more. Their primary purpose was to provide direct fire against beach positions and surface attack for first-echelon landing waves. Secondary roles included engaging light surface vessels and escorting other landing craft.

There were two major types of Landing Craft, Gun: Landing Craft, Gun (Medium), or LCG(M) for short, and Landing Craft, Gun (Large), known as LCG(L). Despite both being named Landing Craft, Gun, the Medium and Large vessels were almost completely different from each other. They were used by the Royal Navy as well as the United States Navy through lend-lease.

== Landing Craft, Gun (Medium) ==
The Landing Craft, Gun (Medium) was effectively a downsized version of the Landing Craft, Tank, though they were all new-built and not converted. Compared to the Large variant, the LCG(M) was more heavily armoured and carried smaller guns. Besides being better suited for short-range engagements, the LCG(M) was able to beach and remove the guns it carried from the turrets for the infantry to use inland. It also had a ballast tank that allowed it to make itself more stable in the water or stabilize on sandbars or riverbanks.

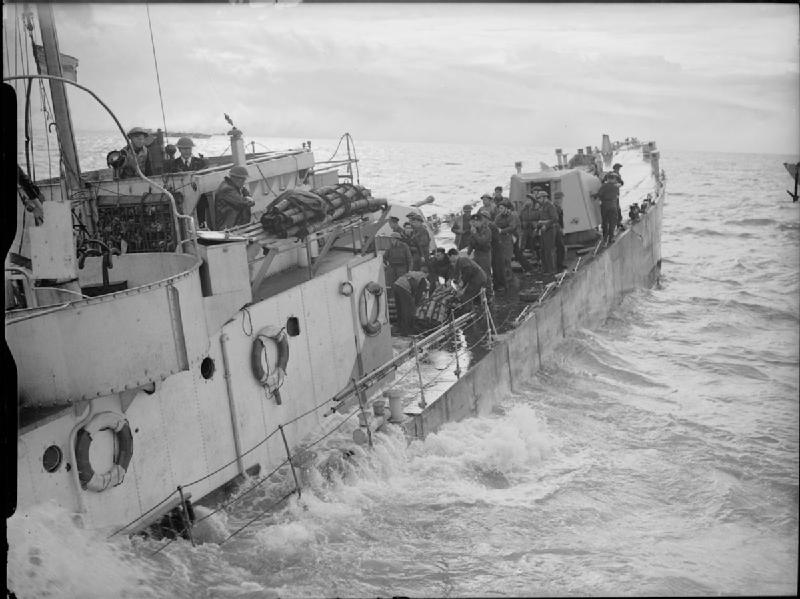
LCG(M)(1) No.101 takes on water after sustaining damage during the landings at Walcheren, November 1944.

The main armament of the first six LCG(M)s was two Ordnance QF 17-pounder anti-tank guns in armoured turrets, while the other 44 were equipped with Ordnance QF 25-pounder gun-howitzers. The turrets were staggered with the forward turret on the starboard side of the vessel and the after turret on the port side. The secondary armament was the same across all fifty vessels, with two Oerlikon 20 mm cannon behind the bridge and two 0.303-inch Lewis guns above the conning tower. The entire vessel was constructed from steel, with up to 80-lb. DIHT plating reinforcing various areas such as the magazines and engine room.

Despite the vessels' heavy armour, the LCG(M)s were still unable to stand up to heavy coastal defences. The limited range of the 17/25-pounder guns forced the ships to draw nearer to their target, which only made the return fire more lethal. Two LCG(M)s were lost during the Walcheren landings in November 1944 when German 150mm coastal defence guns damaged them beyond repair.

A Landing Craft, Gun (Medium) Mark II was designed and ordered in 1944 with some alterations to the design. The armour scheme thicknesses were redistributed, the ballast tank was revised, and the Oerlikon guns were replaced with 0.50-inch Vickers machine guns in twin mounts, with two more twin mounts being added to the aft deck. LCG(M)(2) No. 515 was the only one completed to this pattern, with the few other LCG(M)(2)s constructed retaining the old defensive armament. With World War II drawing to a close in 1945, the vessels that were still under construction were cancelled, and with no use for the type, the Royal Navy sold the rest of the LCG(M)s off after a few years. One LCG(M)(1), No. 111, was sold to France, who slightly modified it and used it during the First Indochina War.

== Landing Craft, Gun (Large) ==
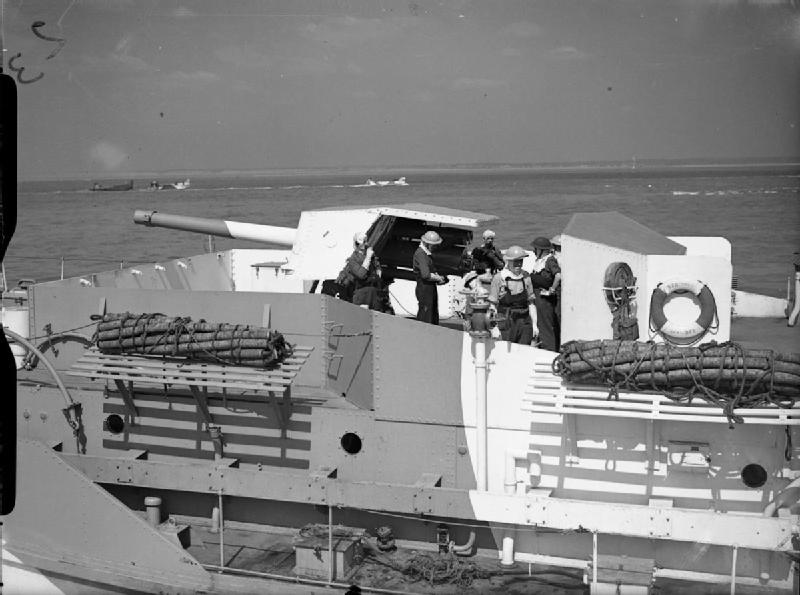
the BL 4.7-inch mounting

The Landing Craft, Gun (Large) was a fire support vessel converted from the Landing Craft, Tank by installing a welded deck. It carried two QF 4.7-inch Mk IX** or BL 4.7-inch Mk I naval cannons as its primary armament, with a secondary array of 20mm Oerlikon guns for anti-aircraft cover. The LCG(L)(3), based on the LCT(3), had two deck guns, while the LCG(L)(4), which was based on the LCT(4), had a superfiring after turret. As time went on, the anti-air armament of the LCG(L) steadily improved. Initially, it was the same as the LCT it was derived from, with two 20mm Oerlikon or 2-pounder 'pom-poms' near the bridge. The single Oerlikon mounts would later be replaced by twin mounts, and the last three LCG(3)s would be given two extra 20mm Oerlikon mountings for a total of six guns. The LCG(L)(4) was the most well-defended, with seven 20mm Oerlikon guns spread across its deck.

The LCG(L) would see service throughout World War II, providing medium range fire support and escorting landing craft. In battle, three were lost in Operation Neptune and two were lost in Operation Infatuate. Owing to their large calibre guns, LCG(L)s were once called "mini destroyers" by a BBC broadcast, and they were able to destroy any light vessels that they encountered with their overwhelming firepower, such as Marinefährprahm landing craft. The surviving vessels were sold off after the end of the war.
