= HMS Unrivalled =

British submarine

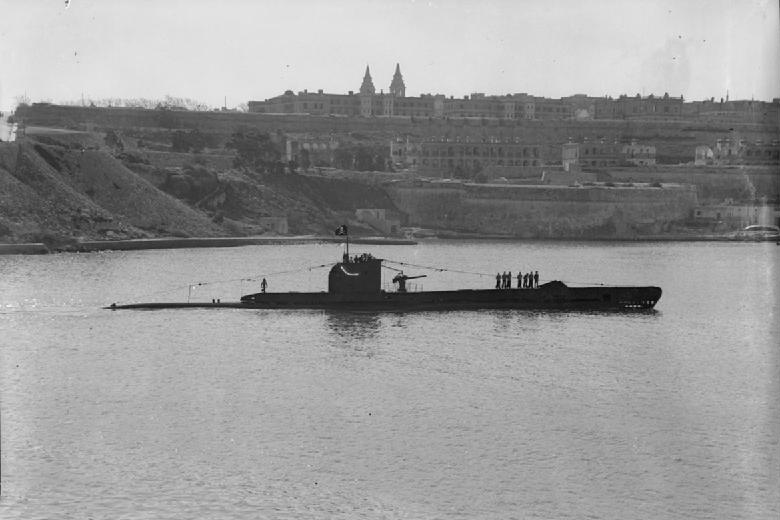
- HMS Unrivalled entering Grand Harbour, Malta, flying the Jolly Roger flag denoting the sinking of a U-boat.

History

United Kingdom
- Name: HMS Unrivalled
- Ordered: 23 August 1940
- Builder: Vickers Armstrong, Barrow-in-Furness
- Laid down: 12 May 1941
- Launched: 16 February 1942
- Commissioned: 3 May 1942
- Fate: Scrapped 22 January 1946
- Badge

General characteristics
- Class & type: U-class submarine
- Displacement: 648 long tons (658 t) surfaced; 735 long tons (747 t) submerged
- Length: 195 ft 6 in (59.6 m)
- Beam: 15 ft 9 in (4.8 m)
- Draught: 15 ft 10 in (4.8 m)
- Propulsion: 2 shafts, 2 Davey-Paxman Diesel engines, 615 bhp (459 kW) total; 2 electric motors, 825 bhp (615 kW) total
- Speed: 11.25 knots (20.84 km/h; 12.95 mph) surfaced; 9 knots (17 km/h; 10 mph) submerged
- Endurance: Surfaced: 5,000 nmi (9,300 km; 5,800 mi) at 10 kn (19 km/h; 12 mph); Submerged: 120 nmi (220 km; 140 mi) at 2 kn (3.7 km/h; 2.3 mph)
- Test depth: 200 ft (61 m)
- Complement: 33
- Armament: 4 × 21 inch (533 mm) bow torpedo tubes; 1 × 3-inch (76 mm) QF Mk I gun; 3 × 0.303 in (7.7 mm) machine guns

HMS Unrivalled (P45) was a U-class submarine built for the Royal Navy during World War II. The boat has been the only ship of the Royal Navy to ever bear the name Unrivalled. Completed in 1942, the boat spent most of the war in the Mediterranean. She sank a number of small merchant ships and naval auxiliaries, but major success eluded her during the war. Too small and slow for the post-war environment, Unrivalled was scrapped in 1946.

== Design and description ==
HMS Unrivalled was one of the second group of U-class submarines ordered on 23 August 1940. These submarines differed from their predecessors in that they were lengthened by 5 feet (1.5 m) "to give a more streamlined shape aft and to improve the flow of water over the propellers."

The submarine was 195 feet 6 inches (59.6 m) long and 15 feet 9 inches (4.80 m) abeam. Unrivalled had a single hull with internal ballast tanks and had a draught of 15 feet 19 inches (5.05 m) when surfaced. She displaced 735 long tons (747 t) while submerged, but only 648 long tons (658 t) on the surface. The submarine was equipped with two diesel engines and twin General Electric electric motors—for surfaced and submerged running, respectively. They were coupled together with a diesel-electric transmission. Unrivalled had a surface speed of up to 11.25 knots (20.84 km/h; 12.95 mph) and could go as fast as 9 knots (17 km/h; 10 mph) while underwater. The boat could carry up to 55 long tons (56 t) of diesel fuel, giving her a range of 5,000 nautical miles (9,300 km; 5,800 mi) at 10 knots (19 km/h; 12 mph). Her electric motors and batteries provided a range of 120 nautical miles (220 km; 140 mi) at 2 knots (3.7 km/h; 2.3 mph) while submerged.

HMS Unrivalled was equipped with four 21-inch (533 mm) bow torpedo tubes and could carry eight torpedoes. The submarine was also armed with a 3-inch (76 mm) QF Mk I gun deck gun. She had a crew of 33 men.

== Career ==
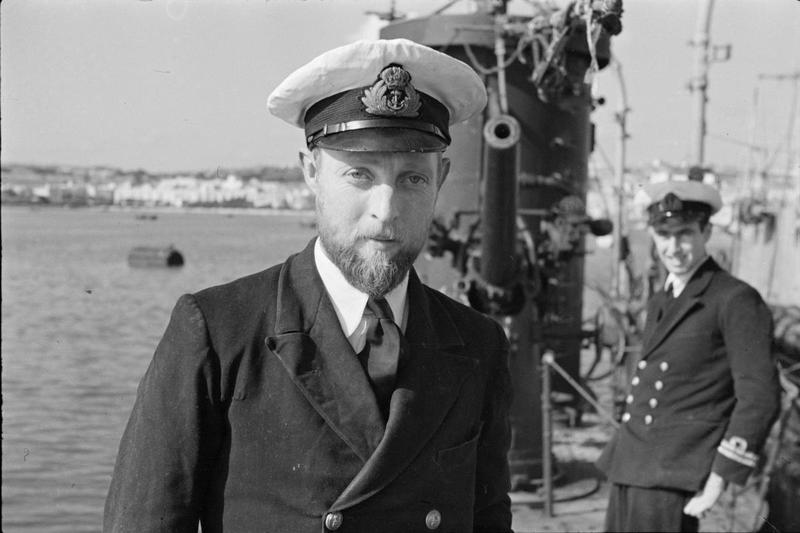
Lt H B Turner RN, commanding officer of HMS Unrivalled, Malta, 26–28 January 1943 (IWM A14488)

HMS Unrivalled was ordered on 23 August 1940 as part of the 1940 naval construction programme from Vickers-Armstrong at Barrow-in-Furness. She was laid down on 12 May 1941, launched on 16 February 1942 and commissioned on 3 May 1942.

Apart from a work-up patrol in the Norwegian Sea, she spent the bulk of the war in the Mediterranean. While working up, Unrivalled fired a torpedo at what was thought to be a submerged enemy submarine. Only the periscope was sighted, and the torpedo was fired in the direction detected by the hydrophones, but no German submarine was in the area. Whilst in service in the Mediterranean, she sank a number of small merchantmen and small naval auxiliary vessels with both torpedoes and gunfire. These included the Italian auxiliary submarine chaser O 97 / Margherita, the Italian merchants Maddalena, Mostaganem and Pasubio, the Italian tugs Genova and Iseo, the Italian sailing vessels Triglav, Albina, Margherita, Sparviero and Ardito, the German auxiliary submarine chasers UJ 2201/Bois Rose and UJ 2204/Boréal, the Italian tanker Bivona, the small Italian merchant Santa Mariana Salina, the Italian auxiliary minesweeper R 172 / Impero and the small Italian vessel San Francisco di Paola A.

Unrivalled also damaged the Italian torpedo boat Antonio Mosto on 3 December 1942, but neither sank or damaged any Axis ships after 28 July 1943. During Operation Husky in July 1943, she was stationed offshore to mark the landing beaches for the 1st Canadian Infantry Division. The boat survived the war, but was too slow for requirements and was not retained after the war. She was scrapped at Briton Ferry, Wales, beginning on 22 January 1946.
