= German submarine U-706 =

German World War II submarine

History

Nazi Germany
- Name: U-706
- Ordered: 9 October 1939
- Builder: H. C. Stülcken Sohn, Hamburg
- Yard number: 766
- Laid down: 22 November 1940
- Launched: 24 November 1941
- Commissioned: 16 March 1942
- Fate: Sunk on 2 August 1943

General characteristics
- Class & type: Type VIIC submarine
- Displacement: 769 tonnes (757 long tons) surfaced; 871 t (857 long tons) submerged
- Length: 67.10 m (220 ft 2 in) o/a; 50.50 m (165 ft 8 in) pressure hull
- Beam: 6.20 m (20 ft 4 in) o/a; 4.70 m (15 ft 5 in) pressure hull
- Height: 9.60 m (31 ft 6 in)
- Draught: 4.74 m (15 ft 7 in)
- Speed: 17.7 knots (32.8 km/h; 20.4 mph) surfaced; 7.6 knots (14.1 km/h; 8.7 mph) submerged
- Test depth: 230 m (750 ft); Crush depth: 250–295 m (820–968 ft)
- Complement: 4 officers, 40–56 enlisted
- Armament: 5 × 53.3 cm (21 in) torpedo tubes (four bow, one stern); 14 × torpedoes; 1 × 8.8 cm (3.46 in) deck gun (220 rounds); 1 x 2 cm (0.79 in) C/30 AA gun

Service record
- Part of: 5th U-boat Flotilla; 16 March – 30 September 1942; 3rd U-boat Flotilla; 1 October 1942 – 2 August 1943
- Identification codes: M 43 347
- Commanders: Kptlt. / K.Kapt. Alexander von Zitzewitz; 16 March 1942 – 2 August 1943
- Operations: 5 patrols: 1st patrol: 22 September – 7 November 1942; 2nd patrol: 8 December 1942 – 13 February 1943; 3rd patrol: 15 March – 11 May 1943; 4th patrol: 4 – 8 July 1943; 5th patrol: a. 26 – 27 July 1943; b. 29 July – 2 August 1943
- Victories: 3 merchant ships sunk (18,650 GRT)

German submarine U-706, a type VIIC U-boat, was laid down on 22 November 1940. She was launched on 24 November 1941 and commissioned on 16 March 1942.

== Design ==
German Type VIIC submarines were preceded by the shorter Type VIIB submarines. U-706 had a displacement of 769 tonnes (757 long tons) when at the surface and 871 tonnes (857 long tons) while submerged. She had a total length of 67.10 m (220 ft 2 in), a pressure hull length of 50.50 m (165 ft 8 in), a beam of 6.20 m (20 ft 4 in), a height of 9.60 m (31 ft 6 in), and a draught of 4.74 m (15 ft 7 in). The submarine was powered by two Germaniawerft F46 four-stroke, six-cylinder supercharged diesel engines producing a total of 2,800 to 3,200 metric horsepower (2,060 to 2,350 kW; 2,760 to 3,160 shp) for use while surfaced, two Garbe, Lahmeyer & Co. RP 137/c double-acting electric motors producing a total of 750 metric horsepower (550 kW; 740 shp) for use while submerged. She had two shafts and two 1.23 m (4 ft) propellers. The boat was capable of operating at depths of up to 230 metres (750 ft).

The submarine had a maximum surface speed of 17.7 knots (32.8 km/h; 20.4 mph) and a maximum submerged speed of 7.6 knots (14.1 km/h; 8.7 mph). When submerged, the boat could operate for 80 nautical miles (150 km; 92 mi) at 4 knots (7.4 km/h; 4.6 mph); when surfaced, she could travel 8,500 nautical miles (15,700 km; 9,800 mi) at 10 knots (19 km/h; 12 mph). U-706 was fitted with five 53.3 cm (21 in) torpedo tubes (four fitted at the bow and one at the stern), fourteen torpedoes, one 8.8 cm (3.46 in) SK C/35 naval gun, 220 rounds, and a 2 cm (0.79 in) C/30 anti-aircraft gun. The boat had a complement of between forty-four and sixty.

== Service history ==
U-706 was commanded by Korvettenkapitän Alexander von Zitzewitz. She was attached to the 5th Flotilla from 16 March until 30 September 1942. On 1 October 1942, she was transferred to the 3rd Flotilla and made five patrols during the war, sinking three ships with a total tonnage of 18,650 GRT. On 2 August 1943, while in Bay of Biscay, she was disabled by depth charges from a Canadian Hampden aircraft, then finished off by a US Liberator aircraft from A/S Sqdn. 4. She sank at position 46°15′N 10°25′W.

=== Wolfpacks ===
U-706 took part in ten wolfpacks, namely:

- Luchs (1 – 6 October 1942)
- Panther (6 – 20 October 1942)
- Südwärts (24 – 26 October 1942)
- Falke (28 December 1942 – 4 January 1943)
- Jaguar (18 – 31 January 1943)
- Seeteufel (23 – 30 March 1943)
- Löwenherz (1 – 10 April 1943)
- Lerche (10 – 16 April 1943)
- Meise (16 – 22 April 1943)
- Specht (22 April – 4 May 1943)

== Summary of raiding history ==
Date	Ship Name	Nationality	Tonnage (GRT)	Fate
12 October 1942	Stornest	United Kingdom	4,265	Sunk
5 April 1943	British Ardour	United Kingdom	7,124	Sunk
12 April 1943	Fresno City	United Kingdom	7,261	Sunk

== Bibliography ==
- Busch, Rainer; Röll, Hans-Joachim (1999). German U-boat commanders of World War II : a biographical dictionary. Translated by Brooks, Geoffrey. London, Annapolis, Md: Greenhill Books, Naval Institute Press. ISBN 1-55750-186-6.
- Busch, Rainer; Röll, Hans-Joachim (1999). Der U-Boot-Krieg, 1939-1945: Deutsche U-Boot-Verluste von September 1939 bis Mai 1945 [German U-boat losses from September 1939 to May 1945] (in German). Vol. IV. Hamburg, Berlin, Bonn: Mittler. ISBN 3-8132-0514-2.
- Gröner, Eric; Jung, Dieter; Maass, Martin (1991). German Warships 1815-1945: U-boats and Mine Warfare Vessels. Vol. 2. Translated by Thomas, Keith; Magowan, Rachel. London: Conway Maritime Press. ISBN 0-85177-593-4.
