= HMS Azalea (K25) =

Flower-class corvette

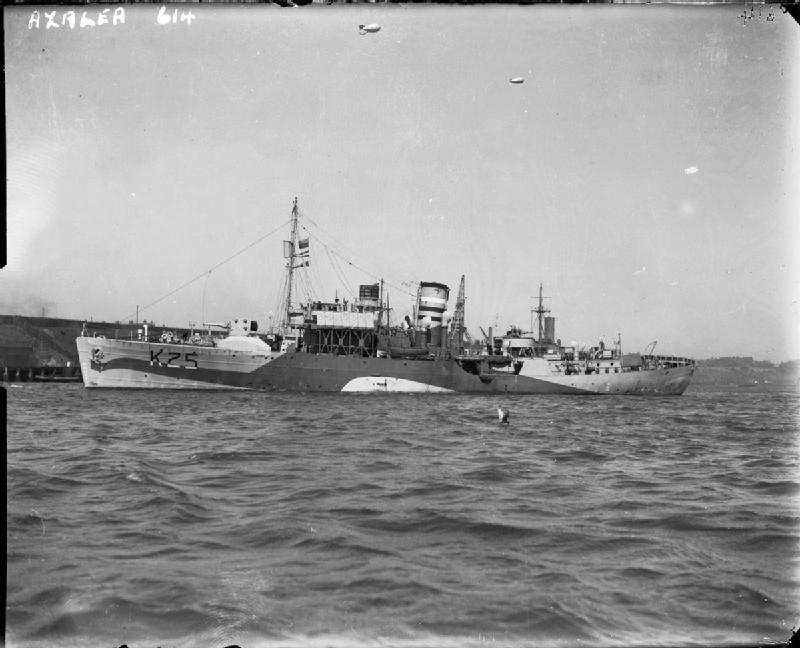
- HMS Azalea

History

United Kingdom
- Name: HMS Azalea
- Builder: Cook, Welton & Gemmell
- Laid down: 15 November 1939
- Launched: 8 July 1940
- Commissioned: 27 January 1941
- Identification: Pennant number: K25
- Fate: Sold 5 April 1946 as mercantile Norte, and sank on 19 January 1955

General characteristics
- Class & type: Flower-class corvette

HMS Azalea was a Flower-class corvette that served in the Royal Navy during World War II.

== Construction ==
Azalea was laid down by Cook, Welton & Gemmell of Beverley on 15 November 1939; launched on 8 July 1940; and commissioned on 27 January 1941.

== World War II service ==
On 12 April 1941, Azalea and Kenogami fired a shot over the bow of the U.S.-flagged American Export liner Siboney 320 nautical miles (590 km) out of Lisbon. After crew aboard Azalea questioned Wenzel Habel, the captain of the unarmed passenger liner, Siboney was allowed to go on her way.

HMS Azalea was the sole allied warship present during the German raid on allied landing craft during Exercise Tiger off Slapton Sands, England in the early morning of 28 April 1944. Although Azalea received word via radio of the presence of German torpedo boats from naval headquarters ashore, because of a typographical error in orders, the escorted LSTs did not. Azalea did not relay the notice. In the attack, three LSTs were hit by torpedoes, two were sunk.

== Fate ==
Azalea was sold on 5 April 1946 and became the merchant ship Norte. She sank on 19 January 1955.
