= November 1942 =

Month of 1942

<<	November 1942					>>
Su	Mo	Tu	We	Th	Fr	Sa
1	2	3	4	5	6	7
8	9	10	11	12	13	14
15	16	17	18	19	20	21
22	23	24	25	26	27	28
29	30

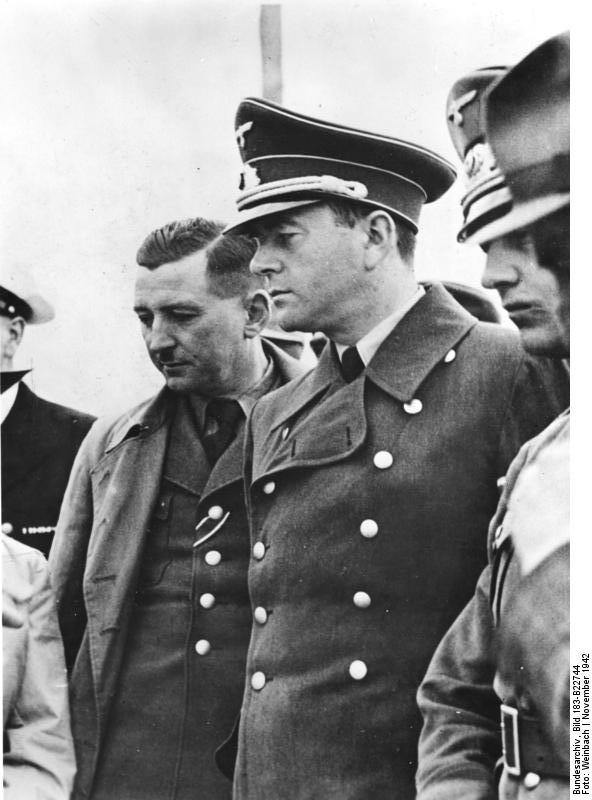
World War II 1939-45 The Reich Minister for Armaments and War Production, accompanied by the head of the OT (Organisation Todt) headquarters, Ministerial Director Dorsch (left), inspects a large construction site on the Atlantic coast. November 1942

The following events occurred in November 1942:

== November 1, 1942 (Sunday) ==
- U.S. forces began the Matanikau Offensive on Guadalcanal.
- German Army Group A captured Alagir.
- Escape from Fort Stanton: Four German sailors escaped from an internment camp at Fort Stanton, New Mexico.
- The Embassy of the Soviet Union posted a bulletin announcing that the Presidium of the Supreme Soviet had formed a committee for the investigation of war crimes committed by the Germans and their associates to the people and property of the USSR.
- Strikes broke out in Haute-Savoie in protest of the Vichy government's forced recruitment of labour for Germany.
- Legislative elections were held in Portugal. Since the country was a one-party state, the National Union claimed 100% of the vote.
- Born:
  - Larry Flynt, adult magazine publisher, in Lakeville, Kentucky (d. 2021)
  - Ralph Klein, politician, in Calgary, Alberta (d. 2013)
  - Marcia Wallace, actress, in Creston, Iowa (d. 2013)
- Died: Hugo Distler, 34, German organist and composer

== November 2, 1942 (Monday) ==
- Australian troops captured the village of Kokoda and the accompanying airfield.
- Operation Supercharge, the second phase of the Second Battle of El Alamein, begins before dawn. Allied troops attack from the salient captured earlier in the battle, intending to finally break through Axis lines.
- Stars and Stripes became a daily publication, the first in U.S. Army history.
- The BBC began French-language broadcasts to Canada.
- German submarine U-306 was commissioned.
- Born:
  - Shere Hite, American-born German sex educator and feminist, in St. Joseph, Missouri (d. 2020)
  - Stefanie Powers, actress, in Hollywood, California
  - Ron Reed, baseball player, in La Porte, Indiana
- Died: John Eldridge Jr., 39, United States Naval Aviator, killed in action in the Solomon Islands

== November 3, 1942 (Tuesday) ==
- Erwin Rommel received an order from Adolf Hitler to "stand and die", but disregarded it as plans for a withdrawal were already in place.
- The Koli Point action began on Guadalcanal.
- The United States midterm elections were held. The Republican Party gained seats but the Democrats retained control of both chambers.
- The fugitives in the Escape from Fort Stanton were recaptured. One of the escapees was wounded in a shootout with authorities.
- German submarine U-198 was commissioned.
- Died:
  - Ernest Gibbins, 41, British entomologist (speared to death by Ugandan tribesmen)

== November 4, 1942 (Wednesday) ==
- The Matanikau Offensive ended in American victory.
- The Axis retreat from El Alamein begins in earnest as Allied troops break through their lines. The main combat phase of the battle is now over, to be followed by the pursuit phase.
- German submarine U-132 was sunk in the Atlantic Ocean by the explosion of the British cargo ship Hatimura, which had just been torpedoed by U-442.
- German submarines U-169 and U-416 were commissioned.

== November 5, 1942 (Thursday) ==
- Fighting in and around Stalingrad forced the city's power plant to shut down.
- German submarine U-408 was depth charged and sunk north of Iceland by an American Catalina.
- German submarines U-647, U-658 and U-712 were commissioned.
- Born: Pierangelo Bertoli, singer-songwriter and poet, in Sassuolo, Italy (d. 2002)
- Died: George M. Cohan, 64, American songwriter and entertainer

== November 6, 1942 (Friday) ==
- The Battle of Madagascar ended in Allied victory.
- Carlson's Patrol begins, an operation by the 2nd Marine Raider Battalion during the Guadalcanal Campaign. It was named after the battalion's commander Evans Carlson.
- The British passenger ship City of Cairo was torpedoed and sunk south of Saint Helena by German submarine U-68 with the loss of 104 of the 311 people on board.
- Born:
  - Ken Patera, U.S. Olympic weightlifter, professional wrestler and strongman; in Portland, Oregon
  - Jean Shrimpton, model and actress, in High Wycombe, Buckinghamshire, England

== November 7, 1942 (Saturday) ==
- Joseph Stalin issued an Order of the Day on the 25th anniversary of the October Revolution promising that the enemy "will yet feel the weight of the Red Army's smashing blows."
- The Australian 24th Brigade advanced to Leaney's Corner and flanked the Japanese defenders on the Kokoda Track.
- French general Henri Giraud was secretly spirited out of Vichy France by the British submarine Seraph.
- German submarine U-274 was commissioned.
- Born:
  - Tom Peters, writer, in Baltimore, Maryland;
  - Johnny Rivers, rock and roll singer, songwriter, guitarist and record producer, in New York City

== November 8, 1942 (Sunday) ==
- British and American forces began Operation Torch, the invasion of French North Africa.
- François Darlan was in Algiers visiting his ill son when the Allied invasion began. He convinced the local Vichy authorities not to oppose the landings.
- Operation Brushwood was executed as part of Torch. Forces captured Fedhala and then marched to nearby Casablanca.
- The Battle of Port Lyautey began for the city of Port Lyautey in French Morocco.
- The Naval Battle of Casablanca began. On the first day the Vichy French Navy lost the destroyers Albatros, Brestois, Boulonnais, Fougueux, Frondeur, Milan, Tornade and Tramontane as well as the cruiser Primauguet to beachings or sinkings.
- Vichy France broke off diplomatic relations with the United States.
- Hitler made his annual speech in Munich on the 19th anniversary of the Beer Hall Putsch. Hitler claimed that Stalingrad was in German hands with only "a few small pockets" of resistance left.
- Born:
  - Angel Cordero, Jr., horse racing jockey, in Santurce, San Juan, Puerto Rico
  - Fernando Sorrentino, writer, in Buenos Aires, Argentina

== November 9, 1942 (Monday) ==
- German forces invaded Tunisia without opposition from nearby French troops.
- Canada, Cuba and Mexico broke off diplomatic relations with Vichy France.
- The American troopship Leedstown, immobilised in the Mediterranean Sea the previous day by an attack from the Luftwaffe, was finished off by a torpedo from German submarine U-331.
- Died:
  - Eddie Leonski, 24, American soldier and serial killer (executed at Pentridge Prison)
  - Edna May Oliver, 59, American actress

== November 10, 1942 (Tuesday) ==
- Admiral Darlan agreed to a ceasefire in French North Africa.
- Oran, Algeria surrendered to the Allies.
- The Battle of Port Lyautey ended when U.S. troops captured the city's fortress and local airfield.
- The incomplete French battleship Jean Bart was heavily damaged in harbour at Casablanca by U.S. aircraft.
- After Darlan agreed to the ceasefire in North Africa, German forces launched Case Anton, the occupation of Vichy France.
- Darlan declared that the German occupation of Vichy released him from affiliation with the Vichy government. He pledged total co-operation with the Allies with the only condition that he be appointed high commissioner for French North Africa. General Eisenhower agreed.
- Winston Churchill took to the podium at the Lord Mayor's Luncheon in London with news of the Allied victory at El Alamein. "Now this is not the end," Churchill said. "It is not even the beginning of the end. But it is, perhaps, the end of the beginning."
- Haiti broke off diplomatic relations with Vichy France.
- British destroyer HMS Martin was sunk off Algiers by German submarine U-431.
- Japanese submarine I-15 was sunk off San Cristóbal in the Solomons by the American destroyer minesweeper USS Southard.
- The Philip Barry play Without Love premiered at the St. James Theatre on Broadway. It would be adapted into a film in 1945.
- The comedy film Road to Morocco starring Bing Crosby, Bob Hope and Dorothy Lamour was released.
- Born:
  - Robert F. Engle, economist, in Syracuse, New York; Hans-Rudolf Merz, politician, in Herisau, Switzerland

== November 11, 1942 (Wednesday) ==
- The Second Battle of El Alamein ended in a decisive Allied victory.
- The Dominican Republic severed diplomatic relations with Vichy France.
- German submarine U-532 was commissioned.
- British Commandos conducted Operation Fahrenheit, an overnight raid on a signals station at Point de Plouézec, France.
- The Italian Army invades and occupies Monaco, forming the fascist puppet state "State of Monaco" with Louis II remaining as the Prince of Monaco due to the support of his old army colleague, Marshal Philippe Pétain.
- The Turkish parliament passes the Varlık Vergisi, a capital tax mostly levied on non-Muslim citizens with the **de jure** aim to collect money for WW2, but with the **de facto** aim to end their prominence in the country's economy.
- The USS Joseph Hewes (AP-50) was torpedoed and sunk by U-173, 100 seamen and Captain Smith were killed.

== November 12, 1942 (Thursday) ==
- The Naval Battle of Guadalcanal began.
- The Koli Point action ended in American victory.
- U.S. Congress approved the drafting of men 18 and 19 years old.
- Eddie Rickenbacker and five others were rescued in the Pacific Ocean after being lost adrift at sea for three weeks. The men had stayed alive on a diet of a few oranges retrieved from their plane when it went down, some fish they'd managed to catch and a seagull that Rickenbacker had grabbed with his bare hands.
- Guatemala broke off diplomatic relations with Vichy France.
- German submarine U-272 sank off Hela after colliding with U-634.
- German submarine U-660 was depth charged and damaged north of Oran by British warships and had to be scuttled.
- German submarines U-360 and U-648 were commissioned.
- The USS Hugh L. Scott, the USS Edward Rutledge, and the SS President Cleveland (1920) (USS Tasker H. Bliss) were sunk by U-130, 59 crew members died on board the Hugh L. Scott, 15 men died on the Edward Rutledge, and 31 died on the Tasker H. Bliss.
- Died: Laura Hope Crews, 62, American actress

== November 13, 1942 (Friday) ==
- Montgomery captured Tobruk, squeezing Rommel between two large advancing Allied forces.
- The American light cruiser Juneau was sunk at the Naval Battle of Guadalcanal. 687 men were killed in action, including the five Sullivan brothers. The Americans also lost the cruiser Atlanta and the destroyers Barton, Cushing, Laffey and Monssen, while the Japanese lost the battleship Hiei and destroyers Akatsuki and Yūdachi.
- German submarine U-411 was depth charged and sunk west of Gibraltar by a Lockheed Hudson of No. 500 Squadron RAF.
- Brazil, El Salvador, Honduras and Panama broke off diplomatic relations with Vichy France.
- Died:
  - Daniel J. Callaghan, 52, United States Navy officer (killed in action during the Naval Battle of Guadalcanal)
  - Norman Scott, 53, United States Navy Rear Admiral (killed in action during the Naval Battle of Guadalcanal)

== November 14, 1942 (Saturday) ==
- Japanese heavy cruiser Kinugasa was sunk by aircraft during the Naval Battle of Guadalcanal.
- British submarine HMS Sahib sinks Italian cargo liner Scillin, unaware that Scillin is transporting over 800 Allied prisoners of war from North Africa to Italy. Almost all of the prisoners drown. Britain kept the cause of the sinking a secret until 1996.
- German submarines U-595 and U-605 were depth charged and sunk in the Mediterranean by British aircraft.
- German submarines U-231 and U-733 were commissioned.

== November 15, 1942 (Sunday) ==
- The Naval Battle of Guadalcanal ended in a strategic American victory. On the battle's final day the Japanese battleship Kirishima and destroyer Ayanami were sunk by the American battleship USS Washington, while the Americans lost the destroyers Benham, Preston and Walke.
- Church bells were rung throughout England in celebration of the Allied victory at El Alamein. It was the first time that church bells had sounded since 1940 when they were silenced during the threat of German invasion.
- German submarine U-98 was depth charged and sunk southwest of Cape St. Vincent, Portugal by the British destroyer Wrestler.
- German submarine U-259 was depth charged and sunk in the Mediterranean by a Lockheed Hudson of No. 500 Squadron RAF.
- The American Liberty ship SS Robert E. Peary was commissioned just 4 days, 15 hours and 29 minutes after the keel was laid down.
- Issue #1 of the Archie comic book was published (cover date Winter 1942).
- Born: Daniel Barenboim, pianist and conductor, in Buenos Aires, Argentina

== November 16, 1942 (Monday) ==
- Operation Torch ended in Allied victory.
- The Kokoda Track campaign ended in Allied victory.
- The Naval Battle of Casablanca ended in American victory.
- The Battle of Buna–Gona began.
- German submarine U-173 was depth charged and sunk off Casablanca by American warships.
- German submarines U-192 and U-668 were commissioned.
- Born: Joanna Pettet, actress, in London, England
- Died: Joseph Schmidt, 38, Austro-Hungarian and Romanian Jewish tenor and actor

== November 17, 1942 (Tuesday) ==
- The British Eighth Army occupied Derna, Libya.
- New Zealand broke off diplomatic relations with Vichy France.
- German submarine U-331 surrendered after being crippled by depth charges from a Lockheed Hudson of No. 500 Squadron RAF north of Algiers. A Fairey Albacore torpedoed and sank the submarine, unaware that the crew had surrendered.
- Born:
  - Martin Scorsese, filmmaker, in Queens, New York
  - Bob Gaudio, singer, musician and record producer, in the Bronx, New York;
  - Kang Kek Iew, Khmer Rouge leader and convicted war criminal, in Kampong Cham, French Indochina (d. 2020);
  - István Rosztóczy, microbiologist, in Budapest, Hungary (d. 1993);

== November 18, 1942 (Wednesday) ==
- The British Eighth Army reached Cyrene, Libya.
- Philippe Pétain granted Vichy Prime Minister Pierre Laval the authority to rule by decree.
- President Roosevelt ordered registration for Selective Service of all youths who had turned 18 since July 1. This made about 500,000 more Americans eligible for service.
- German submarines U-307, U-419 and U-649 were commissioned.
- Born:
  - Linda Evans, actress, in Hartford, Connecticut;
  - Susan Sullivan, actress, in New York City

== November 19, 1942 (Thursday) ==
- The Soviets launched Operation Uranus, a counterattack aimed at surrounding Axis forces at Stalingrad.
- The Battle for Velikiye Luki began on the Eastern Front.
- Operation Freshman: A British airborne force landed using gliders in Norway with the intent of sabotaging a chemical plant in Telemark that the Germans could use for their atomic weapons programme. Neither of the two aircraft-glider forces were able to land near their objective and the operation ended in failure with 41 killed.
- Died: Bruno Schulz, 50, Polish writer, artist, literary critic and art teacher (shot by a Nazi)

== November 20, 1942 (Friday) ==
- The Siege of Malta ended after 2 years, 5 months and 9 days.
- The British Eighth Army retook Benghazi.
- The 1,525-mile Alaska Highway was officially opened.
- Born:
  - Joe Biden, 46th President of the United States, 47th Vice President of the United States, in Scranton, Pennsylvania
  - Norman Greenbaum, singer and songwriter, in Malden, Massachusetts

== November 21, 1942 (Saturday) ==
- Hitler forbade the German 6th Army from retreating from Stalingrad.
- German submarine U-517 was depth charged and sunk southwest of Iceland by Fairey Albacore planes from the aircraft carrier HMS Victorious.
- German submarine U-184 went missing off Newfoundland. Her fate is unknown.
- The character of Tweety Bird first appeared in the Warner Bros. cartoon A Tale of Two Kitties.
- Born: Afa Anoaʻi, professional wrestler, in Samoa (d. 2024)
- Died:
  - J. B. M. Hertzog, 76, 3rd Prime Minister of South Africa
  - Count Leopold Berchtold, 79, Austro-Hungarian politician;

== November 22, 1942 (Sunday) ==
- During Operation Uranus the Red Army secured the vital bridge over the Don River at Kalach-na-Donu west of Stalingrad.
- The new German army group Army Group Don was created with Erich von Manstein in command.
- Paul Ludwig Ewald von Kleist was made Commander-in-Chief of Army Group A.
- Viscount Cranborne replaced Stafford Cripps as Lord Privy Seal.
- The Robe by Lloyd C. Douglas topped The New York Times Fiction Best Seller list, where it would stay for the rest of the year and much of 1943.
- Born:
  - Francis K. Butagira, diplomat, in Bugamba, Uganda
  - Dick Stockton, sportscaster, in Philadelphia, Pennsylvania

== November 23, 1942 (Monday) ==
- Operation Uranus ended in decisive Soviet victory with the German 6th Army completely encircled at Stalingrad.
- The Governor General of French West Africa agreed to accept the authority of François Darlan. This brought the strategically valuable port city of Dakar under Allied control.
- German U-boat U-172 torpedoed and sank the British merchant ship SS Benlomond off the coast of Brazil. Chinese second steward Poon Lim survived and would spend 133 days adrift on a raft in the South Atlantic.
- Died:
  - Hernando Siles Reyes, 60, 37th President of Bolivia
  - Tomitarō Horii, 52, Japanese general (drowned while attempting to canoe down the Kumusi River during the Battle of Buna–Gona);

== November 24, 1942 (Tuesday) ==
- Case Blue ended in strategic Axis failure.
- The Japanese destroyer Hayashio was heavily damaged by American planes in the Huon Gulf. The destroyer Shiratsuyu rescued the survivors and then scuttled the ship with a torpedo.
- German submarine U-387 was commissioned.
- Born: Billy Connolly, comedian, actor and musician, in Anderston, Glasgow, Scotland

== November 25, 1942 (Wednesday) ==
- Soviet forces launched Operation Mars, an offensive around the Rzhev salient near Moscow.
- The Germans began airlifting supplies to the 6th Army trapped in Stalingrad. Only 47 Ju 52 transport planes were on hand for the first day, a small fraction of what was needed. Hermann Göring ordered as many Ju 52s as possible to be requisitioned from around occupied Europe to join in the operation.
- The British Special Operations Executive (SOE) in co-operation with Greek Resistance fighters executed Operation Harling, destroying the heavily guarded Gorgopotamos viaduct.
- British submarine Utmost was sunk off Sicily by the Italian torpedo boat Groppo.
- German submarines U-275 and U-533 were commissioned.
- Born: Rosa von Praunheim, Latvian-born German film director, author, painter and gay rights activist, in Riga

== November 26, 1942 (Thursday) ==
- Colombia broke off diplomatic relations with Vichy France.
- Battle of Brisbane: Two nights of rioting between U.S. military personnel and Australian servicemen and civilians broke out in Brisbane, Australia.
- German submarine U-650 was commissioned.
- Born:
  - Khalil Kalfat, scholar, short story writer and activist, in Aswan, Nubia, Egypt (d. 2015)
  - Blackjack Mulligan (ring name for Robert Jack Windham), professional wrestler, in Sweetwater, Texas (d. 2016)

== November 27, 1942 (Friday) ==
- Scuttling of the French fleet in Toulon: The French fleet in Toulon was scuttled to keep it out of the hands of German forces. 3 battleships, 7 cruisers, 15 destroyers, 12 submarines and 13 torpedo boats were among the ships scuttled.
- Venezuela broke off diplomatic relations with Vichy France.
- Born:
  - Jimi Hendrix, rock guitarist, singer and songwriter, in Seattle, Washington (d. 1970)
  - Manolo Blahnik, fashion designer, in Santa Cruz de La Palma, Canary Islands

== November 28, 1942 (Saturday) ==
- The Cocoanut Grove nightclub fire killed 492 people in Boston.
- The British troopship Nova Scotia was torpedoed and sunk in the Indian Ocean by German submarine U-177 with the loss of 858 out of 1,052 people aboard.
- Battle of Réunion: Free French Naval Forces destroyer Léopard landed 74 troops on the island of Réunion near Madagascar. The island's pro-Vichy administration was overthrown and replaced with a Free French one.
- The British destroyer Ithuriel was bombed and damaged beyond repair at Bône, Algeria by the Luftwaffe.
- The Army–Navy Game was played in Annapolis, Maryland, with Navy defeating Army 14–0. Only 13,000 spectators saw the game because of a wartime travel restriction that only allowed residents within 10 miles of Annapolis to attend.
- German submarines U-199, U-232 and U-341 were commissioned.
- Born: Paul Warfield, football player, in Warren, Ohio
- Died: Toni Jo Henry, 26, American criminal and the only woman ever executed in Louisiana by electric chair

== November 29, 1942 (Sunday) ==
- German forces in Tunisia clashed with the British and Americans at Tebourba and Djedeida.
- The British Eighth Army under General Bernard Montgomery stopped their westward advance at El Agheila after making some 1,000 km in 14 days.
- Churchill made a radio broadcast reviewing the state of the war and suggesting that the Italian people faced a choice between enduring "prolonged scientific and shattering air attack" from North Africa or overthrowing Mussolini.
- The cargo liner Dunedin Star ran aground on the Skeleton Coast of South West Africa. Crew and passengers would spend the next 26 days trekking overland to Windhoek.
- A constitutional referendum was held in Uruguay. 77.17% of voters approved the new constitution.
- Coffee rationing began in the United States.
- Died:
  - Franz Berger, 25, Austrian Wehrmacht officer (killed in the Battle of Stalingrad);
  - Alexis Charles Doxat, 75, English recipient of the Victoria Cross

== November 30, 1942 (Monday) ==
- The Battle of Tassafaronga was fought off Tassafaronga Point, Guadalcanal, resulting in tactical Japanese victory. Japanese destroyer Takanami was shelled and sunk by the cruiser USS Minneapolis but the American cruiser USS Northampton was torpedoed by Japanese destroyer and sank in the early hours of December 1.
- German auxiliary cruiser Thor was destroyed in the Port of Yokohama by a series of explosions on the supply ship Uckermark.
- Died: Buck Jones, 50, American actor
