= August 1942 =

Month of 1942

<<	August 1942					>>
Su	Mo	Tu	We	Th	Fr	Sa
						1
2	3	4	5	6	7	8
9	10	11	12	13	14	15
16	17	18	19	20	21	22
23	24	25	26	27	28	29
30	31

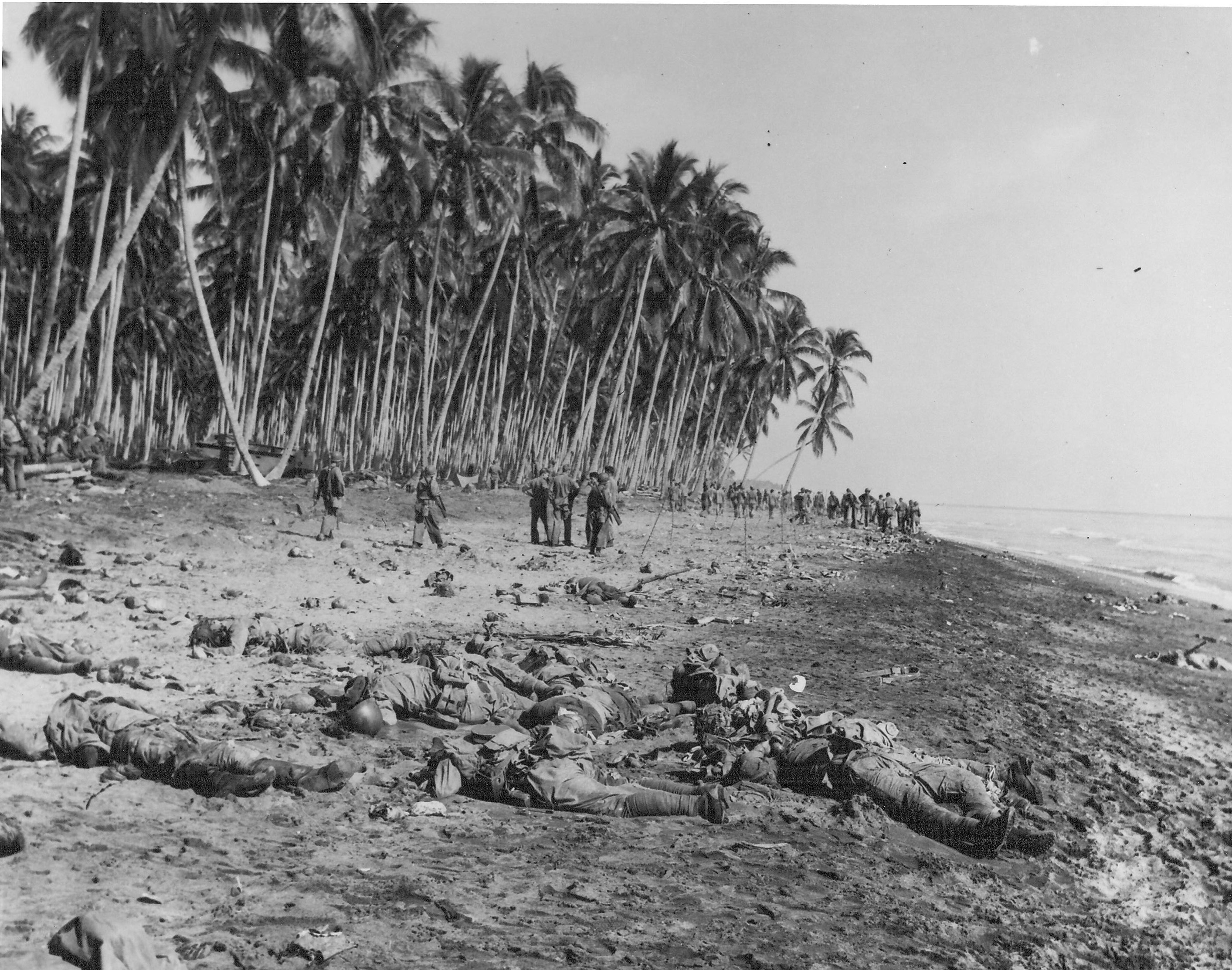
August 21, 1942: Japanese soldiers killed during the Battle of the Tenaru.

The following events occurred in August 1942:

== August 1, 1942 (Saturday) ==
- The Germans cut the railway line linking Stalingrad to Krasnodar.
- 1942–1944 musicians' strike: The American Federation of Musicians went on strike against the major U.S. recording companies because of disagreements over royalty payments.
- Andrey Yeryomenko met with Joseph Stalin at the Kremlin and accepted command of one of Stalingrad's southern fronts.
- German submarines U-226 and U-448 were commissioned.
- Born:
  - Jerry Garcia, singer, songwriter and guitarist for the Grateful Dead, in San Francisco, California (d. 1995);
  - Giancarlo Giannini, actor and dubber, in La Spezia, Italy
  - Brianda Domecq, writer and environmentalist, in New York, USA.

== August 2, 1942 (Sunday) ==
- The German 4th Panzer Army captured Kotelnikovo.
- After spending most of the day studying maps of Stalingrad and the surrounding area, Andrey Yeryomenko had a second conference with Stalin. Yeryomenko protested that two Russian fronts in the same area meant that trying to co-ordinate Stalingrad's defence with another commander would be "utterly confusing, if not tragically impossible," and asked to command the Stalingrad Front in the north rather than the Southeastern Front. Stalin firmly said that everything would be left as it was already outlined.
- A man named José Gallardo Díaz was found unconscious and dying on a road near a swimming hole in Commerce, California. He was rushed to the hospital but died shortly after. 17 Mexican-American youths were soon arrested in a case that came to be known as the Sleepy Lagoon murder.
- Born:
  - Isabel Allende, writer, in Lima, Peru

== August 3, 1942 (Monday) ==
- The British launched Operation Pedestal, an effort to get desperately needed supplies to Malta.
- German submarine U-335 was torpedoed and sunk southeast of the Faroe Islands by the British submarine Saracen.
- American destroyer USS Tucker struck a mine off Espiritu Santo late in the day and sank early on August 4.
- Died:
  - James Cruze, 58, American film actor and director;
  - Richard Willstätter, 69, German organic chemist

== August 4, 1942 (Tuesday) ==
- The German 4th Panzer Army crossed the Aksay River in its drive on Stalingrad.
- Yeremenko flew down to Stalingrad in a Douglas transport aircraft. Commissar Nikita Khrushchev met him at the airport with a car and they drove to the city's headquarters.
- The Bracero program was initiated when the United States signed the Mexican Farm Labor Agreement with Mexico.
- German submarine U-372 was depth charged and sunk off Haifa by a Vickers Wellington bomber.
- Citing documents seized in a raid on Indian National Congress headquarters in Allahabad, the British government accused Mahatma Gandhi and the majority of his party of working toward "appeasement" of Japan.
- The musical film Holiday Inn starring Bing Crosby and Fred Astaire with music by Irving Berlin premiered in New York City.
- Born: David Lange, 32nd Prime Minister of New Zealand, in Otahuhu, New Zealand (d. 2005)

== August 5, 1942 (Wednesday) ==
- German forces took Voroshilovsk.
- Anthony Eden announced in the House of Commons that the Munich Agreement of 1938 would play no part in the postwar settlement of Czechoslovakia's borders, because the British government no longer considered itself bound to that agreement since the Germans destroyed it.
- Queen Wilhelmina of the Netherlands visited the White House and addressed U.S. Congress.
- German submarines U-188, U-304 and U-415 were commissioned.

== August 6, 1942 (Thursday) ==
- German forces on the Eastern Front captured Tikhoretsk and Armavir.
- Dzyatlava massacre: During the liquidation of the Zdzięcioł Ghetto several thousand Jews were murdered at the local Jewish cemetery.
- For aiding an escaped German prisoner of war, Detroit restaurant owner Max Stephan became the first American sentenced to execution for treason since the Whiskey Rebellion in 1794.
- The British submarine HMS Thorn went missing off southern Crete, probably sunk by the Italian torpedo boat Pegaso.
- The Germans lost three submarines in one day. U-210 was rammed and sunk in the Atlantic Ocean by the Canadian destroyer Assiniboine, U-612 sank off Gotenhafen, Germany after colliding with U-444, and U-578 went missing in the Bay of Biscay. Her fate remains unknown.
- German submarine U-634 was commissioned.
- Born: Evelyn Hamann, actress, in Hamburg, Germany (d. 2007)

== August 7, 1942 (Friday) ==
- The Guadalcanal Campaign and the Battle of Tulagi and Gavutu–Tanambogo began. Allied forces consisting mostly of U.S. Marines made amphibious landings in the southern Solomon Islands in the first major offensive by the Allies against Japan.
- The German 6th Army crossed the Don at Kalach.
- Winston Churchill visited the British troops at El Alamein.
- Alfonso López Pumarejo became the 16th President of Colombia.
- Born:
  - Tobin Bell, actor, in Queens, New York City;
  - Garrison Keillor, author and radio personality, in Anoka, Minnesota
  - Sir Richard Sykes, British microbiologist, chair of the Vaccine Taskforce, in Huddersfield, Yorkshire, England
  - Caetano Veloso, Brazilian musician, in Santo Amaro, Bahia
- Died:
  - William Gott, 44, British Army officer (plane shot down in North Africa);
  - Janusz Korczak, 63 or 64, Polish-Jewish educator, children's author and pediatrician (killed at Treblinka)

== August 8, 1942 (Saturday) ==
- U.S. Marines captured the unfinished Japanese airbase on Guadalcanal. The base was named Henderson Field after the Battle of Midway hero Lofton R. Henderson.
- The Battle of Savo Island, the first major naval engagement of the Guadalcanal Campaign, began.
- German Army Group B captured Surovikino.
- The American attack transport USS George F. Elliott was bombed and sunk in Ironbottom Sound by a Mitsubishi G4M.
- German submarine U-379 was depth charged and sunk southeast of Cape Farewell, Greenland by the Royal Navy corvette Dianthus.
- Mahatma Gandhi made the Quit India speech.
- Died: Edward H. Ahrens, 22, United States Marine Raider (killed in action during the Guadalcanal campaign)

== August 9, 1942 (Sunday) ==
- The Battle of Tulagi and Gavutu–Tanambogo ended in Allied victory.
- The Battle of Savo Island ended in tactical Japanese victory. American cruisers Astoria, Quincy and Vincennes and the Australian cruiser Canberra were all sunk while three Japanese cruisers were damaged.
- American destroyer Jarvis was sunk by Japanese aircraft off Guadalcanal.
- German Army Group A captured Krasnodar and the Soviet oil centre of Maykop.
- The Leningrad première of Shostakovich's Symphony No. 7 occurred while the city was still under siege by German forces.
- Bombay police arrested Mahatma Gandhi and fifty other members of the Indian National Congress a few hours before a massive civil disobedience campaign was to begin. Five people were killed later in the day when police fired on crowds of people who were jeering and throwing stones.
- Ahmad Qavam became Prime Minister of Iran for the third time.
- The Walt Disney animated film Bambi had its world premiere in London.
- The New York Times Best Seller list switched from a local survey to a national one compiled from booksellers in 22 cities. The first Fiction Best Seller under the new system was And Now Tomorrow by Rachel Field.
- Died: Edith Stein, 50, German Jewish philosopher and Catholic saint (murdered at Auschwitz)

== August 10, 1942 (Monday) ==
- The German 6th Army crossed the lower Don River and reached the outskirts of Stalingrad.
- Forward elements of German Army Group A reached Pyatigorsk.
- In the second phase of the Battle of Kokoda, Australian troops which had briefly recaptured Kokoda on the 8th are now forced to withdraw, ending the engagement.
- Japanese cruiser Kako was torpedoed and sunk off Simbari Island, New Ireland by the American submarine USS S-44.
- The Italian submarine Scirè was sunk off Haifa by the British armed trawler Islay.
- While on his way to Moscow, Winston Churchill stopped at Tehran and had lunch with the Shah of Iran.

== August 11, 1942 (Tuesday) ==
- Pierre Laval reached an agreement with the Germans that 150,000 French workers would go to Germany in exchange for 50,000 French prisoners of war.
- The British aircraft carrier HMS Eagle was torpedoed and sunk by the German submarine U-73 during Operation Pedestal.
- Sixty-one people died in riots in New Delhi.
- Al Milnar of the Cleveland Indians and Tommy Bridges of the Detroit Tigers had one of the most epic pitchers' duels in baseball history. With the game locked in a scoreless tie in the top of the ninth inning, Milnar lost a no-hitter with two out when Doc Cramer singled to right field. Both pitchers maintained their shutouts until the fifteenth inning when the game was finally called in a 0–0 tie.
- Died: Sabina Spielrein, 56, Russian physician and psychoanalyst (murdered by an SS death squad)

== August 12, 1942 (Wednesday) ==
- The Second Moscow Conference began. In attendance were Joseph Stalin, Winston Churchill, and U.S. representative W. Averell Harriman.
- Elements of German Army Group A reached Slavyansk.
- During Operation Pedestal the British cruiser Cairo and British destroyer Foresight were sunk, and the tanker Ohio was severely damaged and had to be taken under tow.
- Movie star Clark Gable entered a U.S. Army recruiting station in Los Angeles and enlisted as a private at the age of 41.
- German submarines U-468, U-526, U-527 and U-709 were commissioned.
- Died: Phillips Holmes, 35, American film actor (mid-air plane collision)

== August 13, 1942 (Thursday) ==
- Bernard Montgomery took over command of the British Eighth Army following the death of William Gott.
- On the Eastern Front, German forces captured Elista.
- During Operation Pedestal the British cruiser Manchester was torpedoed and heavily damaged by two Italian motor torpedo boats and then scuttled.
- Japan passed the Enemy Airmen's Act, stating that Allied airmen participating in bombing raids against Japanese-held territory would be treated as "violators of the law of war" and subject to trial and punishment if captured.
- German submarine U-635 was commissioned.
- The play Flare Path by Terence Rattigan premiered at the Apollo Theatre in London.
- Born: Arthur K. Cebrowski, admiral, in Passaic, New Jersey (d. 2005)

== August 14, 1942 (Friday) ==
- Dwight D. Eisenhower was named Anglo-American commander for Operation Torch.
- British Commandos carried out Operation Barricade, an overnight raid on an anti-aircraft gun and radar site northwest of Pointe de Saire, France.
- Born: Molefi Kete Asante, leading scholar of African-American Studies, in Valdosta, Georgia
- Died: Rafaela Ottiano, Italian-American actress (b. 1888)

== August 15, 1942 (Saturday) ==
- Operation Pedestal ended in tactical disaster but strategic victory for the British.
- German troops captured Georgiyevsk and reached the foothills of the Caucasus Mountains.
- 5,000 Jews were arrested in Vichy France.
- German submarines U-189, U-358 and U-759 were commissioned.
- Born: Friede Springer, publisher and spouse of Axel Springer, in Oldsum, Germany

== August 16, 1942 (Sunday) ==
- The Kriegsmarine began Operation Wunderland with the objective of entering the Kara Sea and destroying as many Russian vessels as possible.
- The Russians evacuated Maykop.
- Axis positions in Egypt were bombed by American warplanes for the first time.
- In Bilbao, Spain, a mass was held at the Basilica of Begoña to commemorate members of the Begoña Regiment who died in the Civil War. After the service there was some shouting between the Falangist and Carlist factions, and during the ensuing scuffle a Falangist threw two hand grenades and wounded 30 people.

== August 17, 1942 (Monday) ==
- U.S. Marines conducted the Makin Island raid.
- The Second Moscow Conference ended.
- 1,700 Jews were massacred in the Polish village of Łomazy by Reserve Police Battalion 101.
- German Army Group A established bridgeheads across the Kuban River.
- The USAAF made its first air raid on occupied Europe, bombing railroad marshaling yards at Sotteville-lès-Rouen.
- Died: Clyde A. Thomason, 28, United States Marine and posthumous recipient of the Medal of Honor (killed in action during the Makin Island raid)

== August 18, 1942 (Tuesday) ==
- 900 Japanese troops landed at Taivu Point on Guadalcanal, while another 500 landed at Kokumbona. These landings were the first run of what the U.S. Marines nicknamed the Tokyo Express.
- In Stalingrad Oblast, Soviet forces withdrew southwest of Kletskaya while the Germans renewed their offensive northeast of Kotelnikovo.
- Hitler issued Directive No. 46, Instructions for Intensified Action Against Banditry in the East.
- Born: Judith Keppel, £1,000,000 winner on the UK edition of Who Wants to Be a Millionaire? in Wolverhampton, Staffordshire, England; Wu Ma, filmmaker, in Tianjin, China (d. 2014)

== August 19, 1942 (Wednesday) ==
- The Dieppe Raid took place on the northern coast of France. The operation was virtually a complete failure and almost 60% of the 6,086 men who made it ashore were killed, wounded or captured. The British destroyer Berkeley was crippled by Focke-Wulf Fw 190s and scuttled.
- The Soviets began the Sinyavino Offensive on the southern shore of Lake Ladoga.
- The Battle of Kupres ended with the forces of the Independent State of Croatia successfully defending the town against the Yugoslav Partisans.
- Mahatma Gandhi's son Devdas was arrested in New Delhi for publishing an article on the Indian civil disobedience campaign in violation of the Defence of India Act.
- German submarine U-269 was commissioned.
- Born: Fred Thompson, politician and actor, in Sheffield, Alabama (d. 2015)
- Died: Heinrich Rauchinger, 84, Kraków-born painter, in Theresienstadt (b. 1858)

== August 20, 1942 (Thursday) ==
- Chinese forces recaptured Guangfeng and Shangrao in Jiangxi Province from the Japanese.
- German submarine U-464 was depth charged and crippled in the Atlantic Ocean by a Consolidated PBY Catalina and then scuttled.
- U.S. Twelfth Air Force was established.
- German submarine U-636 was commissioned.
- The comedy-drama film The Talk of the Town starring Cary Grant, Jean Arthur and Ronald Colman was released.
- Born: Isaac Hayes, soul singer, songwriter and actor, in Covington, Tennessee (d. 2008)
- Died: István Horthy, 37, Hungarian politician, fighter pilot and son of Hungarian Regent Miklós Horthy (plane crash)

== August 21, 1942 (Friday) ==
- The Battle of the Tenaru was fought on Guadalcanal, resulting in Allied victory.
- German infantry companies of LI Army Corps crossed the Don in inflatable boats and quickly established a bridgehead near the village of Luchinsky.
- Chinese forces recaptured Yingtan.

== August 22, 1942 (Saturday) ==
- Brazil declared war on Germany and Italy after the sinking of several Brazilian ships.
- The German 16th Panzer Division began crossing the Don as soon as the bridgehead was ready.
- The American destroyer USS Blue was torpedoed and crippled at Ironbottom Sound during the Battle of Guadalcanal by the Japanese destroyer Kawakaze. She was scuttled the next day after salvage attempts failed.
- Chinese forces captured Yujiang.
- German submarine U-654 was depth charged and sunk in the Caribbean by an American Douglas B-18 Bolo bomber.
- The American destroyer USS Ingraham sank off the coast of Nova Scotia after colliding in heavy fog with the oil tanker Chemung.
- German submarines U-227 and U-449 were commissioned.
- Died: Michel Fokine, 62, Russian choreographer and dancer

== August 23, 1942 (Sunday) ==
- The Battle of Stalingrad began.
- The Luftwaffe conducted the first major bombing raid on Stalingrad. A rain of incendiary and explosive bombs killed more than 40,000 civilians and reduced most of the city to rubble.
- The German 16th Panzer Division came within striking distance of the Stalingrad Tractor Factory, the Soviet Union's largest producer of T-34 tanks.
- At about 1:45 am, 45-year-old Martha Hansen of Twin Falls, Idaho, was fatally mauled by a brown bear or grizzly bear she encountered while walking from her cabin at Yellowstone National Park to the ladies' restroom. Hansen would die of her injuries on August 27.
- Died: Heinrich-Wilhelm Ahnert, 27, German flying ace (shot down over Koptevo, USSR)

== August 24, 1942 (Monday) ==
- The German 6th Army attacked the northern suburbs of Stalingrad.
- The Battle of the Eastern Solomons began. The Japanese aircraft carrier Ryūjō was sunk by aircraft from USS Saratoga.
- The Charge of the Savoia Cavalleria at Isbuscenskij occurred, one of the last cavalry charges in history.
- An earthquake in Peru killed 30 people.
- Winston Churchill returned to England from Moscow.
- German submarine U-193 was commissioned.
- The war film Wake Island, recounting the December 1941 Battle of Wake Island, premiered at the U.S. Marine base at Camp Elliott in San Diego, California.
- Born: Hans Peter Korff, actor, in Hamburg, Germany (d. 2025)

== August 25, 1942 (Tuesday) ==
- The Battle of the Eastern Solomons ended in a draw, but strategic Allied success. The Japanese destroyer Mutsuki was crippled by four B-17s and had to be scuttled.
- The Battle of Milne Bay began in eastern New Guinea.
- A citywide evacuation effort began in Stalingrad. First priority went to specialists and workers whose factories had been destroyed.
- German submarine U-339 was commissioned.
- Born: Ivan Koloff, born Oreal Perras, professional wrestler, in Montreal, Quebec, Canada (d. 2017)
- Died: Prince George, Duke of Kent, 39, British royal (plane crash)

== August 26, 1942 (Wednesday) ==
- The Battle of Isurava, part of the Kokoda Track Campaign, begins, with Japanese forces attacking the Australian positions there.
- A round-up of Jews began in Nazi-occupied France.
- The British government lifted the ban on the communist newspaper The Daily Worker.
- Died: Junichi Sasai, 24, Japanese fighter ace (killed during the Battle of Guadalcanal)

== August 27, 1942 (Thursday) ==
- German Army Group B captured Prokhladny, pushing closer to the oil prize of Grozny.
- British and American bombers raided Rotterdam.
- German submarine U-637 was commissioned.
- Born: "Captain" Daryl Dragon, keyboardist and one-half of the pop music duo Captain & Tennille, in Los Angeles, California (d. 2019)

== August 28, 1942 (Friday) ==
- Japanese destroyer Asagiri was sunk en route to Guadalcanal by American SBD Dauntless dive bombers.
- German submarine U-94 was sunk off Haiti by depth charges from an American PBY Catalina flying boat and ramming by the Canadian corvette Oakville.
- A German fighter-bomber flying at 20,000 feet dropped a 500lb bomb into the centre of the English city of Bristol, killing 45 and wounding 56 people.
- 1942 Suō-nada Typhoon, a violence 935 to 942 hectopascal level, violence wind and tidal wave hit around Suō-nada, Yatsushiro Sea, Ariake Sea, southwestern Honshu and Kyushu Island, Japan. According to Japanese government official document figures, killing 1,158 persons, injures 1,438 persons.
- Born: José Eduardo dos Santos, President of Angola, in Luanda, Angola (d. 2022)

== August 29, 1942 (Saturday) ==
- British destroyer Eridge was permanently disabled off El Daba, Egypt by an Italian torpedo boat.
- The German Tiger I tank made its battlefield debut southeast of Leningrad.
- Japanese submarine Ro-33 was depth charged and sunk near Port Moresby by the Australian destroyer Arunta.
- The Red Cross announced that Japan had refused free passage of ships carrying food, medicine and other necessities for American prisoners of war.
- German submarine U-385 was commissioned.
- Died: Charles Urban, 75, American-born British film producer and distributor

== August 30, 1942 (Sunday) ==
- Operation Wunderland ended in German success.
- The Battle of Alam el Halfa began south of El Alamein.
- The U.S. Army occupied Adak Island. Runways would be constructed there over the next two weeks allowing for air strikes against the nearby Japanese-held islands of Attu and Kiska.
- Born: Jonathan Aitken, politician, in Dublin, Ireland

== August 31, 1942 (Monday) ==
- The Battle of Isurava ends in a Japanese victory, as Australian forces conduct a strategic withdrawal under Japanese pressure.
- The American aircraft carrier USS Saratoga was torpedoed by the Japanese submarine I-26 and had to undergo three months of repairs.
- Harro and Libertas Schulze-Boysen of the anti-Nazi resistance group known as the Red Orchestra were arrested by the Gestapo.
- British Commandos began Operation Anglo, a raid on the island of Rhodes.
- Born: Isao Aoki, golfer, in Abiko, Chiba, Japan
- Died: Georg von Bismarck, 51, German commander of 21st Panzer Division (killed in action during the Battle of Alam el Halfa)
