= October 1942 =

Month of 1942

<<	October 1942					>>
Su	Mo	Tu	We	Th	Fr	Sa
				1	2	3
4	5	6	7	8	9	10
11	12	13	14	15	16	17
18	19	20	21	22	23	24
25	26	27	28	29	30	31

The following events occurred in October 1942:

== October 1, 1942 (Thursday) ==
- The Battle of Rzhev, Summer 1942 ended in Soviet operational failure.
- Australian commandos executed the Raid on Mubo in New Guinea, killing up to 50 Japanese.
- The Japanese transport ship Lisbon Maru was sunk by the American submarine USS Grouper. It was later learned that Lisbon Maru was carrying 1,800 British prisoners of war from Hong Kong; 800 died in the sinking.
- The Bell P-59 Airacomet had its first flight.
- German submarine U-642 was commissioned.
- The monopoly trade company DEGRIGES was founded by Nazi Germany in Greece, to control the resources of the country.
- The British Army - formed the new unit, Royal Electrical and Mechanical Engineers (REME).
- The first Little Golden Books, a popular series of children's books, were published in the United States.
- Born: Günter Wallraff, writer and undercover journalist, in Burscheid, Germany
- Died: Ants Piip, 58, 7th Prime Minister of Estonia (died in a Soviet prison camp)

== October 2, 1942 (Friday) ==
- The British light cruiser Curacoa sank north of Ireland after an accidental collision with the troop transport Queen Mary. It was one of the Royal Navy's worst accidental losses of the war.
- British forces captured Antsirabe in Madagascar.
- The Stabilization Act was enacted in the United States.
- Former French Prime Minister Édouard Herriot was arrested for allegedly plotting against the Vichy government.
- German submarine U-512 was bombed and sunk in the Atlantic Ocean off Cayenne by an American Douglas B-18 Bolo bomber.
- Born: Asha Parekh, actress, director and producer, in Bombay, British India

== October 3, 1942 (Saturday) ==
- German Army Group A captured Elkhotovo in Kirovsky District.
- The V2 rocket (number V4) became the first man-made object to be launched into space.
- U.S. President Franklin D. Roosevelt ordered a freeze on wages, rents and farm prices.
- A small British force carried out Operation Basalt, a raid on the German-occupied Channel Island of Sark.
- The U.S. Office for Emergency Management created the Office of Economic Stabilization with James F. Byrnes as Director.
- The Hollywood Canteen opened in Hollywood, California. The club was operated and staffed completely by volunteers from the entertainment industry and everything in it was free of charge for Allied servicemen and women in uniform.
- German submarines U-229 and U-731 were commissioned.
- Born: Earl Hindman, actor, in Bisbee, Arizona (d. 2003)
- Died: Milan Kalabić, 55 or 56, Serbian military officer (executed by the Gestapo for aiding the Chetniks)

== October 4, 1942 (Sunday) ==
- The German XIV Panzer Corps attacked the Stalingrad Tractor Factory.
- Hermann Göring made a speech in the Berlin Sportpalast to mark the end of the harvest season. He announced that Germany's food situation "will continue to get better since we now possess huge stretches of fertile land."
- Born: Bernice Johnson Reagon, singer, composer, scholar and social activist, in Dougherty County, Georgia

== October 5, 1942 (Monday) ==
- German submarines U-582 and U-619 were depth charged and sunk southwest of Iceland by an American Catalina and a British Lockheed Hudson, respectively.
- German submarine U-359 was commissioned.
- The St. Louis Cardinals defeated the New York Yankees 4-2 to win the World Series four games to one.
- Died: Dorothea Klumpke, 81, American astronomer

== October 6, 1942 (Tuesday) ==
- The second Actions along the Matanikau began around the Matanikau River on Guadalcanal.
- German Army Group A took the oil city of Malgobek.
- Reichskommissar for Norway Josef Terboven declared a state of emergency in and around Trondheim because of recent acts of sabotage. Execution of 34 Norwegians would follow until the state of emergency was lifted six days later.
- Japanese submarine I-22 was depth charged and sunk in the Coral Sea by an American Catalina aircraft.
- A law was passed in Nazi-occupied Belgium equivalent to the one passed in Vichy France on September 4, obligating able-bodied citizens to do work for the government if ordered to.
- Born:
  - Britt Ekland, actress and singer, in Stockholm, Sweden;
  - Fred Travalena, comedian and impressionist, in the Bronx, New York (d. 2009)
- Died: Siegmund Glücksmann, 58, German-Jewish socialist politician (typhoid)

== October 7, 1942 (Wednesday) ==
- As part of Operation Alfa, Italian forces heavily bombed and shelled the Croatian town of Prozor to drive out the communist Partisans there.
- The Soviet 62nd Army withdrew from the Orlovka gully in Stalingrad but fighting continued to rage around the tractor factory, Red October factory and sports stadium.
- The anti-Nazi Home Army carried out Operation Wieniec overnight, targeting rail infrastructure near Warsaw.
- German submarines U-272 and U-469 were commissioned.
- The play The Eve of St. Mark by Maxwell Anderson premiered at the Cort Theatre on Broadway.
- Born:
  - Ronald Baecker, computer scientist, in Kenosha, Wisconsin;
  - Joy Behar, comedian, actress and television personality, in Williamsburg, Brooklyn, New York

== October 8, 1942 (Thursday) ==
- A Nazi radio announcement stated that officers and men captured in the Dieppe raid had been manacled in retaliation for the alleged tying of prisoners during the Sark raid. The British War Office replied that German prisoners of war captured at Dieppe had not had their hands tied and if the Germans did not immediately unshackle their prisoners, then German POWs in Canada would be put in chains starting October 10.
- The Italians entered Prozor.
- German submarine U-179 was depth charged and sunk off Cape Town by the British destroyer HMS Active.
- German submarine U-643 was commissioned.
- The war film Flying Tigers starring John Wayne, John Carroll and Anna Lee was released.
- Died: Effie Ellsler, 87, American actress

== October 9, 1942 (Friday) ==
- The second Actions along the Matanikau ended in American victory.
- The Statute of Westminster Adoption Act was passed in Australia.
- Mob boss Roger Touhy and six others escaped from Stateville Correctional Center in Crest Hill, Illinois. Touhy and his gang would be caught a month later and he would be sentenced to an additional 199 years in prison for the escape.

== October 10, 1942 (Saturday) ==
- The Sinyavino Offensive ended indecisively.
- The British troopship Orcades was torpedoed and sunk near Cape Town by German submarine U-172. 1,022 were rescued but 45 perished.
- Battle of Bowmanville: A revolt in the Bowmanville POW camp in Ontario, Canada broke out. 400 prisoners barricaded themselves in a hall in protest of the intended shackling of 126 prisoners as reprisal for the chaining of Canadian soldiers captured at Dieppe.
- German submarine U-386 was commissioned.
- Died: Vojo Kushi, 24, Albanian and Yugoslav partisan fighter (killed in action in Tirana)

== October 11, 1942 (Sunday) ==
- The Battle of Cape Esperance began off Cape Esperance, Guadalcanal. Japanese destroyer Fubuki and cruiser Furutaka were sunk by American ships of Task Force 64.
- World heavyweight boxing champion Joe Louis told reporters, "My fighting days are over."
- Born: Amitabh Bachchan, film actor, in Allahabad, British India

== October 12, 1942 (Monday) ==
- The Battle of Cape Esperance ended in American victory. The American destroyer USS Duncan sank from damage inflicted by the Furutaka, but the Japanese destroyers Murakumo and Natsugumo were bombed and sunk by U.S. aircraft from Henderson Field.
- German submarine U-597 was depth charged and sunk southwest of Iceland by a Consolidated B-24 Liberator of the Royal Air Force.
- President Roosevelt gave a fireside chat on the topic of the home front.
- The so-called Battle of Bowmanville ended when the barricaded prisoners were subdued.
- Born: Daliah Lavi, actress, singer and model, in Shavei Tzion, Mandatory Palestine (d. 2017)
- Died: Aritomo Gotō, 54, Japanese admiral (died from wounds sustained in the Battle of Cape Esperance)

== October 13, 1942 (Tuesday) ==
- The Japanese battleships Kongō and Haruna bombarded U.S. Marine positions on Guadalcanal for 90 minutes, causing heavy damage.
- Japanese submarine I-30 struck a mine near Singapore and sank.
- Born:
  - Rutanya Alda, actress, in Riga, Latvia;
  - Jerry Jones, businessman and owner of the Dallas Cowboys football team, in Inglewood, California

== October 14, 1942 (Wednesday) ==
- The Germans began another assault on the Stalingrad Tractor Factory.
- The Chetniks massacred over 500 Croats and Muslims and burned numerous villages around Prozor in the process, in the belief that they were harboring and aiding the communist Partisans.
- The Ukrainian Insurgent Army was activated.
- In one of the most significant sinkings in Canadian waters during the war, passenger ferry SS Caribou was torpedoed and sunk in the Cabot Strait by German submarine U-69. 137 of the 252 on board perished.
- German auxiliary cruiser Komet was torpedoed and sunk in the English Channel by a British motor torpedo boat.
- Soviet submarine Shch-213 struck a mine and sank in the Black Sea.
- German submarine U-530 was commissioned.
- Born: Evelio Javier, politician, lawyer and civil servant, in Hamtic, Antique, Philippines (d. 1986)

== October 15, 1942 (Thursday) ==
- The Japanese heavy cruisers Chokai and Kinugasa bombarded Guadalcanal to cover the movement of Japanese ships.
- The American destroyer USS Meridith was sunk by Japanese aircraft off Guadalcanal.
- German submarine U-661 was sunk in the North Atlantic by depth charges from the British destroyer Viscount.
- German submarines U-644 and U-760 were commissioned.
- The Thornton Wilder play The Skin of Our Teeth premiered at the Shubert Theatre in New Haven, Connecticut.
- Died: Marie Tempest, 78, English singer and actress

== October 16, 1942 (Friday) ==
- Allied leaders agreed on Operation Flagpole: a plan to secure co-operation of Vichy France officers in French North Africa.
- The Allies took preliminary steps towards setting up a commission to investigate war crimes.
- A cyclone from the Bay of Bengal reportedly killed 40,000 people, with particularly heavy damage around Contai.
- German submarine U-353 was depth charged, rammed and sunk by the British destroyer HMS Fame.
- German submarine U-340 was commissioned.
- The animated short film The Mouse of Tomorrow, featuring the debut of Mighty Mouse (as "Super Mouse"), was released in the United States.

== October 17, 1942 (Saturday) ==
- The Germans gained control of the Stalingrad Tractor Factory.
- Japanese destroyer Oboro was bombed and sunk northeast of Kiska by B-26 Marauders.
- British cargo ship Empire Chaucer was torpedoed and sunk off Cape Town, South Africa by German submarine U-504.
- Born: Gary Puckett, American singer, in Hibbing, Minnesota

== October 18, 1942 (Sunday) ==
- Adolf Hitler issued the Commando Order stating that all Allied commandos encountered by German forces should be killed immediately without trial, even if they were in proper uniforms or attempted to surrender.
- U.S. Vice Admiral William Halsey, Jr. replaced Robert L. Ghormley as commander of the South Pacific area.
- Born: Willie Horton, baseball player, in Arno, Virginia
- Died: Byron Darnton, 44, American reporter and war correspondent (killed off the coast of Pongani, New Guinea by a bomb from an American B-25)

== October 19, 1942 (Monday) ==
- Soviet forces on the Don Front launched a new offensive.
- Two days of parliamentary elections concluded in Iceland following electoral reforms after the July elections. The Independence Party won a plurality in the Lower House of the Althing.
- Born: Andrew Vachss, crime fiction author and attorney, in New York City

== October 20, 1942 (Tuesday) ==
- The American cruiser USS Chester was hit by a torpedo from the Japanese submarine I-176 southeast of San Cristóbal, killing 11 and wounding 12. Chester was able to make it to Espiritu Santo for emergency repairs.
- German submarine U-216 was depth charged and sunk southwest of Ireland by a B-24 of the Royal Air Force.
- German submarine U-191 was commissioned.
- The Art of This Century gallery was opened in Manhattan by Peggy Guggenheim.
- Born: Christiane Nüsslein-Volhard, biologist and Nobel laureate, in Magdeburg, Germany
- Died: May Robson, 84, Australian-born American actress

== October 21, 1942 (Wednesday) ==
- The German transport ship Palatia was sunk off Lindesnes, Norway by a Handley Page Hampden of the Royal New Zealand Air Force. Palatia was carrying a load of prisoners of war intended for slave labour in Norway; a total of 986 people aboard perished.
- The Revenue Act went into effect in the United States.
- A B-17 carrying Eddie Rickenbacker to conduct an inspection tour of air force facilities in the Pacific and deliver a secret message to Douglas MacArthur went missing en route from Hawaii to Canton Island. The crew had gotten lost and the plane eventually ran out of fuel and went down, all aboard got into three small life rafts and began a 21-day ordeal drifting in the Pacific.
- Gordon Daniel Conant became the 12th Premier of the Canadian province of Ontario after Mitchell Hepburn suddenly resigned.
- German submarines U-273, U-418 and U-667 were commissioned.
- Born: Judith Sheindlin, lawyer and judge turned television personality (Judge Judy), in Brooklyn, New York

== October 22, 1942 (Thursday) ==
- The Battle of Goodenough Island began.
- 100 Lancaster bombers raided Genoa.
- The drama film Now, Voyager starring Bette Davis, Paul Henreid and Claude Rains premiered at the Hollywood Theatre in New York City.
- German submarine U-412 was sunk northeast of the Faroe Islands by a Vickers Wellington bomber.
- German submarine U-645 was commissioned.
- Born:
  - Annette Funicello, actress and singer, in Utica, New York (d. 2013);
  - Pedro Morales, professional wrestler, in Culebra, Puerto Rico (d. 2019)

== October 23, 1942 (Friday) ==
- The Second Battle of El Alamein began.
- The Battle for Henderson Field began on Guadalcanal.
- The Royal Air Force conducted its heaviest raid on Genoa to date.
- The British cruiser HMS Phoebe was torpedoed by German submarine U-161 off Pointe-Noire. Phoebe had to head to New York for repairs and returned to service in August 1943.
- American First Lady Eleanor Roosevelt arrived in London and met with the King and Queen of England at Buckingham Palace.
- The Italian steamship Maria Pompei struck a mine west of Cape Krekavica near Budva and sank.
- Born: Michael Crichton, author, in Chicago, Illinois (d. 2008)
- Died: Ralph Rainger, 41, American composer (plane crash)

== October 24, 1942 (Saturday) ==
- Operations of the German 6th Army in Stalingrad slowed down considerably due to exhaustion after two weeks of intense fighting as well as the weather growing appreciably colder.
- Wilhelm Ritter von Thoma took over command of Afrika Korps after Georg Stumme went missing.
- A huge task force participating in Operation Torch departed England for North Africa.
- German submarine U-599 was depth charged and sunk northeast of the Azores by a British B-24 Liberator.
- German submarine U-230 was commissioned.
- Born: Frank Delaney, novelist, journalist and broadcaster, in County Tipperary, Ireland (died 2017)
- Died:
  - James C. Morton, 58, American actor;
  - Georg Stumme, 56, German general (died on the North African front, possibly of a heart attack)

== October 25, 1942 (Sunday) ==
- The Battle of the Santa Cruz Islands began.
- Erwin Rommel returned to the North African front and resumed command of the Afrika Korps.
- The Japanese cruiser Yura was heavily damaged by U.S. aircraft in the Indispensable Strait off Guadalcanal and had to be scuttled.

== October 26, 1942 (Monday) ==
- The Battle for Henderson Field ended in an American victory.
- On the Eastern Front, the German 1st Panzer Army took Nalchik.
- During the Battle of the Santa Cruz Islands, the American aircraft carrier USS Hornet was heavily damaged by Japanese aircraft and had to be scuttled early the next day. The American destroyer USS Porter was also sunk after being hit by a torpedo.
- The ocean liner troopship President Coolidge sank after striking a mine off Espiritu Santo in the New Hebrides. All 5,340 aboard were rescued.
- The Defence of Outpost Snipe began in North Africa.
- Born: Bob Hoskins, actor, in Bury St Edmunds, West Suffolk, England (d. 2014)

== October 27, 1942 (Tuesday) ==
- The Battle of the Santa Cruz Islands ended in tactical Japanese victory but strategic American victory.
- The Defence of Outpost Snipe ended in British victory.
- The Battle of Goodenough Island ended in Australian victory.
- German submarine U-627 was sunk south of Iceland by depth charges from a B-17 of No. 206 Squadron RAF.
- The war film The Navy Comes Through starring Pat O'Brien and George Murphy had its world premiere at Treasure Island Naval Base in San Francisco Bay.
- Died: Helmuth Hübener, 17, German anti-Nazi (executed)

== October 28, 1942 (Wednesday) ==
- On the second anniversary of Ohi Day, Winston Churchill made a speech to the Greek people telling them that their "courage and spirit in adversity remain a lively inspiration to the United Nations. Outside their own country the armed forces of Greece, the navy, army and air force, are once again in the field already testing their growing strength in the face of the enemy, and anxious for the day, not far off now, when they will be with you and avenging your sufferings."
- 12 Hawker Hurricanes under the command of Greek aviator Ioannis Kellas marked Ohi Day by raiding Italian positions at El Alamein.
- The twentieth anniversary of the March on Rome passed without a speech from Benito Mussolini, who was rarely appearing in public anymore.
- The Richard Strauss opera Capriccio premiered at the National Theatre Munich.
- Clark Gable was commissioned as a second lieutenant, earning the right to regrow his famous mustache which he had to shave off when he enlisted.
- German submarine U-531 was commissioned.

== October 29, 1942 (Thursday) ==
- Leading British clergymen and political figures held a public meeting to express their outrage at the persecution of Jews by Nazi Germany. Churchill sent a message to the meeting stating that "Free men and women denounce these vile crimes, and when this world struggle ends with the enthronement of human rights, racial persecution will be ended."
- The unescorted British passenger ship MV Abosso was torpedoed and sunk northwest of the Azores by German submarine U-575. 362 of the 393 people aboard perished.
- German submarine U-646 was commissioned.
- Born: Bob Ross, painter, art instructor and television host, in Daytona Beach, Florida (d. 1995)
- Died: Conrad C. Binkele, 74, American Lutheran bishop

== October 30, 1942 (Friday) ==
- The Defense of the Adzhimushkay quarry ended with the Germans crushing the last Soviet resistance forces.
- German submarines U-520 and U-658 were depth charged and sunk east of Newfoundland by aircraft of the Royal Canadian Air Force.
- German submarine U-559 was depth charged and sunk in the eastern Mediterranean by British destroyers.
- German submarine U-520 was commissioned.
- Died: Tony Fasson, 29, British Royal Navy officer (drowned while retrieving codebooks from the sinking U-559)

== October 31, 1942 (Saturday) ==
- 30 planes of the Luftwaffe bombed Canterbury in one of the heaviest raids on England since the Blitz.
- Hitler, confident that Stalingrad would fall soon, moved his headquarters from Werwolf back to the Wolf's Lair.
- Two days after signing his first professional contract, 21-year old Maurice Richard played in his first National Hockey League game for the Montreal Canadiens against the Boston Bruins. He recorded an assist during his first NHL shift as the Canadiens went on to win 3-2.
- "White Christmas" by Bing Crosby hit #1 on the Billboard singles charts.
- Born:
  - Dave McNally, baseball player, in Billings, Montana (d. 2002);
  - David Ogden Stiers, American TV actor, in Peoria, Illinois (d. 2018)
- Died: Paul Galland, 22, German Luftwaffe ace (killed in action)
