= July 1942 =

Month of 1942

<<	July 1942					>>
Su	Mo	Tu	We	Th	Fr	Sa
			1	2	3	4
5	6	7	8	9	10	11
12	13	14	15	16	17	18
19	20	21	22	23	24	25
26	27	28	29	30	31

The following events occurred in July 1942:

== July 1, 1942 (Wednesday) ==
- The First Battle of El Alamein began.
- German Army Group South overran Sevastopol fortress.
- Erich von Manstein was promoted to field marshal for capturing Sevastopol.
- 44 Japanese were killed by Australian commandos in the Raid on Heath's Farm in New Guinea.
- The first B-17 Flying Fortress arrived in Britain.
- Pierre Laval allowed German forces to enter Vichy France to hunt for clandestine radio transmitters.
- The Japanese auxiliary ship Montevideo Maru was torpedoed and sunk off Cape Bojeador, Luzon, Philippines by the American submarine Sturgeon, unaware that it was carrying a large number of Australian prisoners of war and civilians. 1,054 Australians perished, the worst maritime disaster in Australian history.
- German submarines U-414 and U-707 were commissioned.
- Born:
  - Geneviève Bujold, actress, in Montreal, Quebec, Canada;
  - Andraé Crouch, gospel singer, songwriter, producer and pastor, in San Francisco, California (d. 2015)
- Died: Peadar Toner Mac Fhionnlaoich, 84, Irish writer

== July 2, 1942 (Thursday) ==
- Following two weeks of reverses on the North African front, a motion of censure was brought against Winston Churchill in the House of Commons proposing that "this House, while paying tribute to the heroism and endurance of the Armed Forces of the Crown in circumstances of exceptional difficulty, has no confidence in the central direction of the war." Churchill gave a lengthy speech before the vote, conceding that the campaign in North Africa had not been going well but insisting that things would improve once vast amounts of American military supplies arrived. The motion was defeated, 475 to 25.
- The German 6th Army and 4th Panzer Army met at Stary Oskol, but no Soviet forces were encircled.
- British forces occupied the island of Mayotte in the Mozambique Channel.
- German submarine U-629 was commissioned.
- The Slovak Academy of Sciences was formed.
- Born: Vicente Fox, 55th President of Mexico, in Mexico City

== July 3, 1942 (Friday) ==
- The Flying Tigers fought their final engagement, driving away eight Japanese bombers raiding Hengyang.
- The American Liberty ship Alexander Macomb was sunk on her maiden voyage east of Cape Cod by German submarine U-215, which was then depth charged and sunk off the coast of New England by the British anti-submarine trawler Le Tiger.
- Russian authorities admitted the loss of Sevastopol but claimed that its capture had cost the Germans 300,000 casualties.
- The U.S. Army relaxed its draft standards to allow induction of selectees with physical deformities for limited military service.

== July 4, 1942 (Saturday) ==
- The Siege of Sevastopol ended after eight months with an Axis victory when organized Soviet resistance in the Crimea ended.
- German authorities began systematically gassing Jews at Auschwitz.
- Soviet forces retreated at Kursk and Belgorod.
- The Flying Tigers were dissolved and replaced by the China Air Task Force.
- The 15th Bombardment Squadron became the first USAAF unit to bomb occupied Europe when it joined the RAF in a raid on the Netherlands.
- Japanese destroyer Nenohi was torpedoed and sunk southeast of Attu Island by the American submarine Triton.
- German submarine U-167 was commissioned.
- Born:
  - Floyd Little, football player, in New Haven, Connecticut (d. 2021);
  - Prince Michael of Kent, in Coppins, Iver, Buckinghamshire, England

== July 5, 1942 (Sunday) ==
- German forces on the Eastern Front reached the Don River.
- Action of 5 July 1942: Japanese destroyer Arare was torpedoed and sunk off Kiska by the American submarine USS Growler.
- Parliamentary elections were held in Iceland. The Independence Party won a plurality of votes but the Progressive Party won a plurality of seats.

== July 6, 1942 (Monday) ==
- The Japanese sent a survey party to the sparsely populated island of Guadalcanal to select a location for an airfield. A site was selected near Lunga Point and construction began.
- German submarine U-502 was sunk in the Bay of Biscay by a Leigh light-equipped Wellington bomber.
- The American League defeated the National League 3-1 in the 10th Major League Baseball All-Star Game at the Polo Grounds in New York City. It was the first night game in All-Star history.

== July 7, 1942 (Tuesday) ==
- German forces in the Battle of Voronezh reach the outskirts of the city.
- The German 6th Army linked up with the 4th Panzer Army northeast of Valuiki.
- Heinrich Himmler authorized sterilization experiments to take place at Auschwitz concentration camp.
- During a debate over a proposed amendment to the National Resources Mobilization Act, Canadian Prime Minister William Lyon Mackenzie King uttered the famous phrase that he believed that nothing better could be suggested than the government's present policy of "not necessarily conscription, but conscription if necessary."
- German submarine U-701 was depth charged and sunk off Cape Hatteras, North Carolina, by a Lockheed Hudson bomber.
- German submarine U-303 was commissioned.
- Born: Carmen Duncan, actress, in Cooma, Australia (d. 2019)

== July 8, 1942 (Wednesday) ==
- The German 1st Panzer Army crossed the Donets.
- Vichy France broke off diplomatic relations with Greece.
- One week after gaining U.S. citizenship, the British-born movie star Cary Grant married the socialite heiress Barbara Hutton at Lake Arrowhead, California.
- German submarine U-524 was commissioned.
- Died:
  - Louis Franchet d'Espèrey, 86, French World War I general;
  - Refik Saydam, 60, fifth Prime Minister of Turkey

== July 9, 1942 (Thursday) ==
- Adolf Hitler modified Case Blue, dividing Army Group South into two groups. Army Group A was to seize Rostov-on-Don and then continue through the Caucusus, while Group B was to drive on Stalingrad through to Astrakhan. Hitler also ordered Hermann Hoth's forces to head south in the hope of encircling the Red Army units still west of the Don River.
- Şükrü Saracoğlu became Prime Minister of Turkey following the death of Refik Saydam.
- Bengali poet Kazi Nazrul Islam got ill in a programme in All India Radio, never to be recovered again.
- German submarine U-630 was commissioned.
- Born: Richard Roundtree, actor, in New Rochelle, New York (d. 2023)
- Died: Wolfgang Kaden, 42, German naval captain (killed near Hammerfest, Norway when his submarine chaser U-Jäger 1110 hit a naval mine)

== July 10, 1942 (Friday) ==
- German forces captured the town of Rossosh and established a bridgehead on the east bank of the Don.
- The Douglas A-26 Invader had its first test flight.
- An American pilot spots the so-called Akutan Zero intact at Akutan Island. Information gained from studying the plane allowed the Americans to devise ways to defeat the Zero. Plane salvaged on July 15.
- German submarine U-186 was commissioned.
- Bombardier was founded in Quebec, Canada.
- The Orson Welles-directed period drama film The Magnificent Ambersons starring Joseph Cotten, Dolores Costello and Anne Baxter was released.
- Born:
  - Ronnie James Dio, heavy metal singer and songwriter, in Portsmouth, New Hampshire (d. 2010);
  - Pyotr Klimuk, cosmonaut, in Kamaroŭka, USSR

== July 11, 1942 (Saturday) ==
- RAF Lancaster bombers flew the longest raid of the European theatre up to this time, traveling 1,750 miles to bomb German shipyards at Danzig.
- Allied convoy PQ 17 finally arrived in Russia after losing 24 of its original 33 vessels, the worst convoy loss of the war. Joseph Stalin suspected that the British had fabricated the heavy losses so as to provide the Soviets with fewer goods than promised.
- Japan canceled invasions of Fiji, New Caledonia and Samoa.
- Hitler issued Directive No. 43, Continuation of Operations from the Crimea.
- German submarine U-136 was depth charged and sunk in the Atlantic Ocean by Allied warships.
- German submarines U-225, U-267 and U-447 were commissioned.

== July 12, 1942 (Sunday) ==
- Joseph Stalin began moving massive numbers of troops into the Stalingrad area. Semyon Timoshenko was placed in overall command of the new Stalingrad Front.
- Soviet general Andrey Vlasov was captured by the Germans. During captivity he would switch sides and collaborate with the Nazis.
- Born: Dennis Day, American child actor and "Mouseketeer"; in Las Vegas (murdered, 2018)
- Died: William J. Powell, 44, American engineer, soldier, civil aviator and author

== July 13, 1942 (Monday) ==
- 5,000 Jews from the Rovno ghetto were shot in a forest near the city.
- Hitler decided to dismiss Fedor von Bock from command of the newly created Army Group B and replace him with Maximilian von Weichs. Bock's dismissal took effect on July 15.
- The American destroyer USS Lansdowne (DD-486) sank the German submarine U-153 near Colón, Panama.
- Born:
  - Harrison Ford, actor, in Chicago, Illinois
  - Roger McGuinn, singer and guitarist of The Byrds, in Chicago, Illinois

== July 14, 1942 (Tuesday) ==
- The Vichy government refused a U.S. offer to move nine warships of the French fleet to an American, neutral or Martinique port to prevent their seizure by the Axis.
- Two women were shot dead in Marseille when an enormous crowd gathered illegally for Bastille Day, waving French flags and singing "La Marseillaise". Charles de Gaulle led Bastille Day celebrations of his own in London.
- The Indian National Congress working committee adopted a resolution demanding British withdrawal from India but denying any intention of embarrassing the Allied war effort.
- The sports drama film The Pride of the Yankees starring Gary Cooper as Lou Gehrig was released.
- The USAT Arcata sank after being shelled by Japanese submarine I-7, 16 died.
- Born: Javier Solana, physicist and politician, in Madrid, Spain

== July 15, 1942 (Wednesday) ==
- Soviet forces abandoned Boguchar and Millerovo.
- An American salvage crew recovered the so-called Akutan Zero intact at Akutan Island. Information gained from studying the plane allowed the Americans to devise ways to defeat the Zero.
- German submarine U-576 was sunk near Cape Hatteras by depth charges from two U.S. aircraft and gunfire from a merchant ship.
- German submarine U-467 was commissioned.
- Born: Mil Máscaras, professional wrestler, in San Luis Potosí City, Mexico
- Died:
  - Roberto María Ortiz, 55, 24th President of Argentina (diabetes)
  - Wenceslao Vinzons, 31, Filipino politician and resistance fighter (executed by the Japanese)

== July 16, 1942 (Thursday) ==
- British XXX Corps captured a key ridge west of El Alamein.
- The two-day Vel' d'Hiv Roundup began when French police under the direction of the Nazis conducted a raid and mass arrest of Jews in Paris.
- A decree was published in Paris announcing that the "nearest male relatives, brothers-in-law, and cousins of troublemakers above the age of eighteen will be shot. All women relatives of the same degree of kinship will be condemned to forced labor. Children of less than eighteen years old of all the above mentioned persons will be placed in reform schools."
- Hitler moved to his new headquarters in Vinnytsia, codenamed Werwolf.
- The United States severed diplomatic relations with Finland.
- In the First Battle of El Alamein, Australian forces were repelled on an attempt to take Point 24 from the Germans and suffered nearly fifty percent casualties.
- German submarine U-631 was commissioned.
- Born:
  - Margaret Court, tennis player, in Perth, Australia;
  - Don Kessinger, baseball player, in Forrest City, Arkansas

== July 17, 1942 (Friday) ==
- Winston Churchill informed Stalin that, in light of the PQ 17 disaster, no further convoys would be sent to northern Russia in the foreseeable future.
- German forces clashed with the Soviet Stalingrad Front for the first time
- German submarine U-751 was depth charged and sunk off Cape Ortegal by British aircraft.
- In the First Battle of El Alamein, Australian forces were pushed back in an attempt to capture Miteirya Ridge, or as they call it "Ruin Ridge".
- Born:
  - Gale Garnett, New-Zealand born Canadian singer, in Auckland;
  - Peter Sissons, BBC journalist, in Liverpool, England (d. 2019)
- Died:
  - Gerhard Bigalk, 33, German U-boat commander (killed in the sinking of U-751)
  - Maury Henry Biddle Paul, 52, American journalist and society columnist

== July 18, 1942 (Saturday) ==
- The German 1st Panzer Army took Voroshilovgrad.
- The Messerschmitt Me 262 had its first test flight with jet engines.
- German submarines U-384 and U-666 were commissioned.
- "Jingle Jangle Jingle" by Kay Kyser and His Orchestra topped the Billboard singles charts.
- Born:
  - Giacinto Facchetti, footballer, in Treviglio, Italy (d. 2006)
  - Adolf Ogi, President of Switzerland, in Kandersteg, Switzerland

== July 19, 1942 (Sunday) ==
- Germany's Second Happy Time drew to a close as U-boats were ordered withdrawn from the U.S. east coast because of the increasing effectiveness of American antisubmarine measures.
- Heinrich Himmler issued an order that all Jews within the General Government be "resettled" to camps by December 31.
- Broadcast of NBC Radio Orchestra's performance (widely regarded as most streamed performance of the century) of Shostakovich's 7th Symphony.

== July 20, 1942 (Monday) ==
- German forces captured Krasnodon.
- Benito Mussolini returned to Rome after Rommel's failed offensive at El Alamein.
- Died:
  - Moses Annenberg, 65, American newspaper publisher;
  - Germaine Dulac, 59, French filmmaker, journalist and critic

== July 21, 1942 (Tuesday) ==
- The Japanese Invasion of Buna–Gona occurred, beginning the Kokoda Track campaign in the Territory of Papua.
- Hitler issued Directive No. 44, Operations in Northern Finland.
- The Japanese freighter Ayatosan Maru was bombed and sunk by American and Australian bombers after unloading troops and supplies at Gona.

== July 22, 1942 (Wednesday) ==
- The German 6th Army reached the great bend in the Don River near Stalingrad.
- Treblinka extermination camp became operational in occupied Poland.
- Grossaktion Warsaw: Mass deportations of Jews began from the Warsaw Ghetto to Treblinka.
- The ban on the Indian communist organization All India Kisan Sabha was lifted after eight years.
- German submarine U-665 was commissioned.
- Died: Stan Gurney, 33, Australian soldier and posthumous recipient of the Victoria Cross (killed in action at El Alamein)

== July 23, 1942 (Thursday) ==
- The German 1st Panzer Army captured Rostov-on-Don.
- Hitler issued Directive No. 45, Continuation of Operation Braunschweig.
- German submarines U-187 and U-632 was commissioned.
- Born: Myra Hindley, one of the Moors murderers, in Manchester, England (d. 2002)
- Died: Adam Czerniaków, 61, Polish-Jewish engineer and head of the Warsaw Ghetto Judenrat (suicide)

== July 24, 1942 (Friday) ==
- The Battle of Voronezh ended in Axis victory.
- German Army Group A occupied Novocherkassk.
- The Japanese completed the Invasion of Buna–Gona.
- German submarine U-90 was depth charged and sunk in the Atlantic Ocean by the Canadian destroyer St. Croix.
- German submarine U-708 was commissioned.
- Born: Chris Sarandon, actor, in Beckley, West Virginia

== July 25, 1942 (Saturday) ==
- The Battle of the Caucasus began on the Eastern Front.
- Died: Siegfried Grabert, 26, German major and recipient of the Knight's Cross of the Iron Cross with Oak Leaves (killed in action near Rostov)

== July 26, 1942 (Sunday) ==
- During the First Battle of El Alamein, British troops launched Operation Manhood in a final attempt to break the Axis forces.
- 403 British bombers raided Hamburg, killing 337 and rendering 14,000 homeless. 14 bombers were lost.
- Born: Hannelore Elsner, actress, in Burghausen, Altötting, Germany (d. 2019)
- Died: Roberto Arlt, 42, Argentine writer

== July 27, 1942 (Monday) ==
- The First Battle of El Alamein ended in stalemate but a strategic Allied victory.
- The German 17th Army captured Bataysk.
- Lordsburg Killings: Two elderly men were shot at a Japanese-American internment camp outside of Lordsburg, New Mexico. The shooter would be charged with murder but later acquitted.
- Born: Bobbie Gentry, singer-songwriter, in Chickasaw County, Mississippi; Dennis Ralston, tennis player, in Bakersfield, California (d. 2020)

== July 28, 1942 (Tuesday) ==
- The Battle of Voronezh ends in German victory.
- Joseph Stalin issued Order No. 227 with its famous line "Not one step back!"
- The Battle of Kupres began in Yugoslavia between the forces of the Independent State of Croatia and the Yugoslav Partisans.
- Arthur Harris made a radio broadcast informing German listeners that the bombers would soon be coming "every night and every day, rain, blow or snow - we and the Americans. I have just spent eight months in America, so I know exactly what is coming. We are going to scourge the Third Reich from end to end, if you make it necessary for us to do so ... it is up to you to end the war and the bombing. You can overthrow the Nazis and make peace."
- Spike Jones and His City Slickers recorded the humorous anti-Nazi song "Der Fuehrer's Face".
- Born: Kaari Utrio, writer, in Helsinki, Finland
- Died: Flinders Petrie, 89, English archeologist

== July 29, 1942 (Wednesday) ==
- The Germans captured Proletarskaya and formed a bridgehead over the Manych River in southern Russia.
- In the Kokoda Track campaign, Japanese forces captured Kokoda itself during the first phase of the Battle of Kokoda.
- German submarine U-268 was commissioned.
- Born: George Kaiser, businessman, billionaire and philanthropist, in Tulsa, Oklahoma
- Died:
  - Louis Borno, 76, 28th President of Haiti
  - Herbert Edward Douglas Blakiston, 79, former Vice-Chancellor of the University of Oxford, after being struck by a car.

== July 30, 1942 (Thursday) ==
- The series of battles known collectively as the Battle of Rzhev, Summer 1942 began on the Eastern Front.
- WAVES, the women's branch of the United States Navy Reserve, was founded in the United States.
- German submarine U-166 was depth charged and sunk in the Gulf of Mexico by the U.S. Navy patrol craft PC-566.
- German submarines U-525 and U-633 were commissioned.
- Died: Jimmy Blanton, 23, American jazz double bassist (tuberculosis)

== July 31, 1942 (Friday) ==
- The Germans lost three submarines to enemy action in the Atlantic Ocean in a single day: U-213, U-588 and U-754.
- 630 British bombers raided Düsseldorf, destroying 453 buildings and killing 276 civilians. 29 bombers were lost.
- American submarine USS Grunion was sunk at Kiska.
- Driving for pleasure was banned in Britain.
- Died: Infanta Marie Anne of Portugal, 81, Grand Duchess consort of Luxembourg
