= U-232 =

U-232 may refer to:

- German submarine U-232, a German Type VIIC submarine used in World War II
- Uranium-232 (U-232 or ^{232}U), an isotope of uranium
