= Primary residence =

Dwelling where a person usually lives

A person's primary residence, or main residence is the dwelling where they usually live, typically a house or an apartment. A person can only have one primary residence at any given time, though they may share the residence with other people. A primary residence is considered to be a legal residence for the purpose of income tax and/or acquiring a mortgage.

Criteria for a primary residence consist mostly of guidelines rather than hard rules, and residential status is often determined on a case-by-case basis.

== Use in urban planning ==
The primary residence is the main dwelling unit on a parcel of land. This term distinguishes this unit from a potential secondary suite.

== Definition in specific jurisdictions ==
=== United Kingdom ===
If taxpayers own a property but never lived in it, it cannot be considered their main residence even if it is the only property they own. Furthermore, the court would ask itself, in order to determine whether the property is their main residence, whether a reasonable person would consider the property their home in light of all the facts surrounding the case.

A ship cannot be considered a residence, and property on land that a person returns to after being at sea would be considered his main residence.

If a person is forced away from the property that would ordinarily be called "home" because of employment but still occasionally return to that property, then it is still classed as their main residence. In Doncaster Metropolitan Borough Council v Stark, Mr Stark, an RAF serviceman, returned to his matrimonial home only when on leave. The court rejected Mrs Stark's claim that she was entitled to the single person's 25% rebate on rates owed the Council. The court ruled that she was not a single person, because the property was also Mr Stark's main residence, that is, where Mr Stark would have lived were it not for the demands of his occupation.

=== United States ===
The requirements to validate your principal residence vary and depend on the agency requesting verification.

On the federal level, the taxpayer's principal residence may in general include a houseboat, a house trailer, or the house or apartment that the taxpayer is entitled to occupy as a tenant-stockholder in a cooperative housing corporation, in addition to the traditional house. Specifically, Treasury Regulation Section 1.121-1(b)(2) gives the following requirements: In the case of a taxpayer using more than one property as a residence, whether property is used by the taxpayer as the taxpayer’s principal residence depends upon all the facts and circumstances. If a taxpayer alternates between 2 properties, the property that the taxpayer uses a majority of the time during the year ordinarily will be considered the taxpayer’s principal residence. In addition to the taxpayer's use of the property, relevant factors in determining a taxpayer's principal residence, include, but are not limited to - (i) The taxpayer's place of employment; (ii) The principal place of abode of the taxpayer's family members; (iii) The address listed on the taxpayer's federal and state tax returns, driver's license, automobile registration, and voter registration card; (iv) The taxpayer's mailing address for bills and correspondence; (v) The location of the taxpayer's banks; and (vi) The location of religious organizations and recreational clubs with which the taxpayer is affiliated.

In the United States, a primary residence is understood to be a property that one has regular access to, as opposed to a property one owns but does not have access to due to it being rented out to others. This can affect eligibility for a mortgage or home equity loan, with requirements generally being looser for getting a loan for a property one lives in, it being believed that a homeowner will try harder to pay the loan if they risk losing their primary residence.

Fraudulent representation of a person's primary residence can result in significant financial downside and potential criminal charges.

== See also ==
- Residency
- Tax residence
- Legal residence
