= The Residency =

The Residency may refer to:

- The Residency, Alice Springs, the former administrative centre of Northern Territory, Australia
- The Residency, Bunbury, the historic private residence located in Bunbury, Western Australia.
- The name of official residences in the British Empire
  - The Residency, Penang, the official residence of the governor of Penang, Malaysia
  - The Residency, Lucknow, a group of buildings in Lucknow, Uttar Pradesh, India
- The official residence of the Government Agent who was the head of the district in colonial and post colonial Sri Lanka

== See also ==
- Government House
- State House (disambiguation)
- Residency (disambiguation)
