= Domicile =

Domicile may refer to:

- Home, a place where someone lives
- Domicile (astrology), the zodiac sign over which a planet has rulership
- Domicile (law), the status or attribution of being a permanent resident in a particular jurisdiction

== See also ==
- Residence (disambiguation)
