= Francis Katana =

Ugandan diplomat, educator and foreign policy expert

Ambassador of Uganda to the United States
- In office 1987–1993

Chief Executive Officer, Uganda Council of Foreign Relations

Personal details
- Born: June 18, 1944 (age 82) Ruharo, Mbarara District, Uganda
- Education: Makerere University (BA in Political Science); * University of Southern California (Master’s in Public Administration)
- Occupation: Diplomat, foreign policy expert, educator
- Known for: Former Ugandan Ambassador to Washington, D.C.; Deputy Ambassador to Denmark

Francis Katana (born, June 18, 1944), also known as Francis E.S Katana is a Ugandan diplomat and foreign policy expert who served as Uganda's ambassador to Washington, USA and as deputy ambassador of Uganda in Copenhagen, Denmark. In addition to being an educator.

== Background and education ==
He was born to Erisa Kappa of Ruharo in Mbarara district on June 18, 1944. He completed his primary school in 1957 at Mbarara Junior School. He later attended Kigezi High School for his secondary education, then Ntare School for both his Uganda Certificate of Education and Uganda Advanced Certificate of Education in 1965. He later joined Makerere University, where he graduated with a bachelor's degree in political science in 1969. He later studied at University of Southern California in the US, where he was awarded a master's degree in public administration.

== Professional career and journey ==
He is the chief executive officer at the Uganda Council of Foreign Relations. He is also a member on the advisory sectoral committee on infrastructure. However, Francis is best known for his diplomatic mission circles as Uganda's former ambassador to Washington and Denmark. While serving as a diplomat, he promoted Ugandan culture and heritage by selling Uganda's waragi. After finishing his studies at Makerere University, he was retained as a research assistant to a professor named, Ali Mazrui. Around October 1969, he joined Uganda Management Institute as an assistant lecturer in international relations and diplomatic studies. After working at UMI for a while, he was awarded a scholarship to the University of Southern California in the US, where he pursued a master's degree in public administration. During his studies in the US, he interned at the United Nations Institute for Training and Research in New York for three months and later graduated in 1971. In 1980 while in Kenya, he taught international relations at the United States International University. While in Canada around 1983, he served as a tutor of African international relations at Carleton University.

In 1986, Francis returned to Uganda and rejoined Ministry of Foreign Affairs. In 1987, he was posted as a minister counsellor to Washington, USA where he worked under Elizabeth Bagaaya until December 1993; however with several promotions from head of chancery to heading the mission as the ambassador after Elizabeth Bagaaya left. Francis was later posted back to Uganda and began working in January 1994 as the State House comptroller for four years. He later rejoined Foreign Affairs and was posted to Copenhagen, Denmark as deputy ambassador. During his mission, Uganda was accredited to five countries; Denmark, Norway, Iceland, Finland and Sweden.

He contributed to the review and writing of the Uganda Foreign Policy Framework for 50 years, which was supported by United Nations Development Programme.

== See also ==
- Francis K. Butagira
- Makerere University
- Christina Markus Lassen
