= Resident =

Resident may refer to:

== People and functions ==
- Artist-in-residence, an institutional program to promote an artist
- Resident assistant, overseer of student housing
- Resident minister, a representative of a government in a foreign country
- Resident (medicine), a stage of postgraduate medical training
- Resident (pharmacy), a stage of postgraduate pharmaceutical training
- Resident engineer, an engineer or expert who works at client-side
- Resident, a person who maintains residency in a given place
- Resident, a person who has tax residence in a country or jurisdiction
- Resident, a patient at a long-term care facility or senior center
- Resident minister (also known as "resident"), a rank in the Indian Political Department of British India
- Resident (Second Life), a member of the Second Life community
- Resident DJ, a DJ who performs at a venue on a regular basis or permanently
- Resident spy, a spy who operates in a foreign country

== Culture ==
- Resident (magazine), an Austrian music magazine
- The Resident (film), a 2011 film starring Hilary Swank, Jeffrey Dean Morgan and Christopher Lee
- The Resident (TV series), a 2018 American medical drama television series airing on Fox that was created by Amy Holden Jones
- The Residents, an American avant garde music and visual arts group

== Other ==
- Resident module, a program that stays in memory throughout the lifetime of a computing session
- Resident bird, a bird that does not migrate

== See also ==
- Residence (disambiguation)
- Residency (disambiguation)
