= September 1942 =

Month of 1942

<<	September 1942					>>
Su	Mo	Tu	We	Th	Fr	Sa
		1	2	3	4	5
6	7	8	9	10	11	12
13	14	15	16	17	18	19
20	21	22	23	24	25	26
27	28	29	30

The following events occurred in September 1942:

== September 1, 1942 (Tuesday) ==
- The German 4th Panzer Army attacked the Soviet 64th Army in the southern suburbs of Stalingrad.
- German Army Group A captured the Black Sea port of Anapa.
- Shigenori Tōgō resigned as Japanese Foreign Minister.
- The German submarine U-756 was depth charged and sunk in the Atlantic Ocean by the Canadian corvette Morden, with the loss of all 43 of its crew.

== September 2, 1942 (Wednesday) ==
- The Soviet 47th Army began nightly evacuation by sea from the Taman Peninsula.
- British Commandos conducted Operation Dryad, an overnight raid on the Casquets lighthouse in the Channel Islands.
- The German submarine U-222 sank in the Baltic Sea off Pillau after colliding with U-626, with 42 of its crew of 45 perishing.
- Died: Tom Williams, 19, a member of the Irish Republican Army, was hanged for murder.

== September 3, 1942 (Thursday) ==
- German troops captured Pitomnik Airfield at Stalingrad.
- Following the August 16 Basilica of Begoña incident, Francisco Franco sacked Ramón Serrano Suñer as head of the Falangists and Foreign Minister and took full control of the Spanish government. Francisco Gómez-Jordana Sousa became the new Foreign Minister.
- Demonstrations and strikes were held throughout Northern Ireland and Eire the day after the execution of Tom Williams.
- The German submarine U-162, which had sunk 14 merchant ships in six months, was depth charged and sunk northeast of Trinidad by British warships. However, 49 of its 51 crew survived and were able to supply allied intelligence with information about the design of the German submarines..
- The German submarine U-705 was depth charged and sunk in the Bay of Biscay by Armstrong Whitworth Whitley bombers, with the loss of all 45 crew.
- Born:
  - Michael Hui, actor, comedian, scriptwriter and director, in Panyu, Guangzhou, Guangdong, China;
  - Al Jardine, guitarist, singer, songwriter and member of The Beach Boys, in Lima, Ohio
- Died: John Mosher, 50, American short story writer and film critic for The New Yorker (heart disease)

== September 4, 1942 (Friday) ==
- Soviet planes bombed Budapest for the first time.
- The Japanese ammunition ship Kashino was torpedoed and sunk in the South China Sea by American submarine USS Growler.
- Service du travail obligatoire: The Vichy French government passed a law requiring all able-bodied men age 18 to 50 and single women 21 to 35 to be subject to do any work the government deemed necessary.
- Gorazd Pavlík, Orthodox Bishop of Prague, together with two priests and lay officials, was executed by firing squad at Kobylisy Shooting Range, having taken the blame for Czech resistance fighters implicated in the assassination of Reinhard Heydrich hiding in his cathedral. This effort to spare wider Nazi retribution among his flock earned him canonization.
- Died: Zsigmond Móricz, 63, Hungarian novelist and social realist

== September 5, 1942 (Saturday) ==
- The Battle of Alam el Halfa, fought in Egypt with General Bernard Montgomery leading British and New Zealand troops against the Axis forces of Germany and Italy led by Erwin Rommel, ended after six days in Allied victory, at the cost of 1,750 Allied and 2900 Axis casualties, and without putting an end to Germany's Afrika Korps.
- The Soviet 24th and 66th Armies counterattacked the XIV Panzer Corps at Stalingrad, but the offensive was called off after losing 30 of 120 tanks, mostly to the Luftwaffe.
- Born: Werner Herzog, filmmaker, in Munich, Germany

== September 6, 1942 (Sunday) ==
- The Germans captured the Russian port of Novorossiysk.
- As tensions in Ireland continued to run high, two policemen were shot dead in Belfast.
- Arvid and Mildred Harnack of the Red Orchestra were arrested by the Gestapo. With all its leaders now imprisoned the Red Orchestra soon collapsed.
- Died:
  - Albert Buck, 57, German Generalmajor (killed in action near Novorossiysk);
  - Günter Steinhausen, 24, German flying ace (killed in action near El Alamein)

== September 7, 1942 (Monday) ==
- The Battle of Milne Bay, fought in the territory of Papua, ended with an in Australian victory over the Japanese attackers. Australia lost 167 men killed or missing, while the Japanese lost 625. U.S. fighters in the 101st Coast Artillery, from the Georgia Army National Guard, suffered 14 deaths.
- The German 6th Army attacked Mamayev Kurgan, the dominant height overlooking Stalingrad.
- Cuba signed an agreement with the United States allowing a flotilla of a dozen American-crewed patrol ships to operate out of Havana under Cuban colors.
- U.S. President Franklin D. Roosevelt gave a fireside chat on inflation and the progress of the war.
- British Commandos executed Operation Branford, an overnight raid on the Channel Island of Burhou.
- Died: Cecilia Beaux, 87, American society portraitist

== September 8, 1942 (Tuesday) ==
- Winston Churchill reviewed the course of the war in an address to the British House of Commons.
- The U.S. government shut down gold mines to release labor for the war effort.
- The characters of Pogo the Possum and Albert the Alligator made their first appearances in the story "Albert Takes the Cake" by Walt Kelly in Animal Comics issue #1.
- Born: Želimir Žilnik, film director, in Niš, Kingdom of Yugoslavia
- Died:
  - Bede Camm, 77, English Benedictine monk and martyrologist
  - Aleksei Gan, executed for "counter-revolutionary" activities in the Soviet Union

== September 9, 1942 (Wednesday) ==
- The first of the two Lookout Air Raids occurred in Oregon. A Japanese Yokosuka E14Y floatplane launched from a submarine dropped two incendiary bombs with the intention of starting a forest fire. One of the bombs struck the Wheeler Ridge of Mount Emily about 10 miles (16 km) east of Brookings, Oregon. The damage done was limited because of the work of a patrol of American civilians with the U.S. Forest Serice who performed as fire lookouts and firefighters.
- Adolf Hitler removed Wilhelm List from command of Army Group A and took over command himself.

== September 10, 1942 (Thursday) ==
- German forces of the 29th Motorized Division broke through to the Volga River on the southern side of Stalingrad. The Soviet 62nd Army was hit along the frontline, with its forces defending just 2 km from the heart of the city.
- The RAF dropped 100,000 bombs on the German city of Düsseldorf in less than an hour.
- The Italian hospital ship Arno was torpedoed and sunk in the Mediterranean by British aircraft. Arno had no patients on board, and most of the medical staff were able to evacuate on boats before Arno sank nine hours after it was attacked, but 27 of its crew died in the bombing.
- Died: Walter Zellot, 21, German fighter ace (shot down over Stalingrad)

== September 11, 1942 (Friday) ==
- An Anglo-Norwegian raiding party of 12 commandos began Operation Musketoon, an attack on the German-held Glomfjord power plant in Norway. While the group put the power plant out of commission, one commando was killed in the battle, and seven others captured as prisoners of war at the Sachsenhausen concentration camp, then executed on October 23.
- The Canadian corvette HMCS Charlottetown was torpedoed and sunk in the Gulf of Saint Lawrence by the German submarine U-517. Out of her crew of 64, nine people were killed including the ship's ranking officer, Royal Canadian Navy Lieutenant Commander John W. Bonner.
- The Japanese destroyer Yayoi was bombed and sunk off Vakuta Island by U.S. and British aircraft, with the loss of 77 of her 150 crew.
- Born: John Greig, footballer, in Edinburgh, Scotland
- Died: Rolf Mützelburg, 29, German U-boat commander, was killed in an accident while swimming at sea.

== September 12, 1942 (Saturday) ==
- The British troopship RMS Laconia, a converted Cunard White Star Line cruise ship, was torpedoed and sunk off the coast of West Africa by the German submarine U-156. The ship was carrying 2,741 people, of whom 1,809 were Italian service members taken as prisoners of war. As the captain of U-156 realized that the ship had been carrying 87 civilians and the Axis prisoners, he signaled a U.S. B-24 bomber to assist in the rescue, and called for other German U-boats to assist. Instead, the captain of the American B-24 attacked the German U-boats and the Germans abandoned the rescue attempts. Estimates were made that at least 1,083 people survived while another 1,658 — almost 1,400 of whom were the Italian prisoners— died in the attack on the Laconia. As a result of the attack on the rescue efforts, Germany's Admiral Karl Dönitz issued the Laconia Order, ordering submarine commanders to not attempt to rescue survivors.
- The destruction of the German garrison in Lenin by Soviet partisans took place near Pinsk in what is now Belarus as a followup to the August 14 liquidation of the Jewish internees of the Lenin Ghetto. The Soviet partisans killed 17 Germans (including the ghetto's commander) as well as 13 local police.
- The German submarine U-88 was depth charged and sunk off Spitsbergen, along with its crew of 46, by the British destroyer Faulknor.
- British Commandos began Operation Aquatint, a raid on the Normandy coast of occupied France, at Sainte-Honorine-des-Pertes.
- Miss Texas Jo-Carroll Dennison was crowned Miss America 1942.
- "(I've Got a Gal In) Kalamazoo" by Glenn Miller and His Orchestra hit #1 on the Billboard singles charts.
- Born: Charles L. Grant, author, in Newark, New Jersey (d. 2006)

== September 13, 1942 (Sunday) ==
- The Wehrmacht began a massive ground assault to try to take the city of Stalingrad, marking the beginning of the house-to-house fighting that most characterized the battle.
- The Allies launched Operation Agreement, a series of ground and amphibious operations carried out by British, Rhodesian and New Zealand forces against Axis-held Tobruk.
- Operation Aquatint ended in British defeat.

== September 14, 1942 (Monday) ==
- The Canadian destroyer Ottawa sank with 114 of its 183 crew after it was torpedoed and sunk in the North Atlantic Ocean by the German submarine U-91 while traveling as part of the Allied Convoy ON 127.
- The Battle of Edson's Ridge, fought at Guadalcanal in the Solomon Islands as part of the U.S. Marines defense against the occupying Japanese 35th Infantry Brigade, ended two days after it began as the Japanese forces retreated into the jungle. At least 830 Japanese troops were dead or missing, along with at least 104 U.S. Marines.
- Operation Agreement ended in Allied failure. The light cruiser Coventry was bombed and damaged by Junkers Ju 87 aircraft and had to be scuttled, while the destroyer Sikh was shelled and sunk off Tobruk by coastal artillery. The destroyer HMS Zulu was bombed by Macchi C.200 of the Regia Aeronautica and sank the next day.
- Chinese forces recaptured Wuyi from the Japanese.
- The New York Yankees clinched the American League pennant with an 8–3 win over the Cleveland Indians.
- Born: Bernard MacLaverty, author, in Belfast, Northern Ireland
- Died: E. S. Gosney, 86, American philanthropist and eugenicist

== September 15, 1942 (Tuesday) ==
- Near Guadalcanal, the American aircraft carrier USS Wasp, carrying 2,139 crew and 71 aircraft on was struck by at least two torpedoes fired by the Japanese submarine I-19. The strike set off several explosions, destroyed the ship's water-mains and its power, and started fires that could not be fought. In the blaze, 193 U.S. Navy crew were killed and 366 wounded, and 46 aircraft were lost. USS Wasp was evacuated, and scuttled later in the day. The destroyer USS Lansdowne, which rescued 447 of the Wasp crew, torpedoed the wreckage, which would be relocated more than 76 years later on January 14, 2019.
- In the same attack, I-19 mortally damaged the destroyer O'Brien, which would founder and sink a month later while being escorted to Pago Pago for repairs.
- The German submarine U-261 was depth charged and sunk west of the Shetland Islands with the loss of all 43 crew.
- Born: Wen Jiabao, Premier of the State Council of the People's Republic of China from 2003 to 2013; in Tianjin, Japanese-occupied China

== September 16, 1942 (Wednesday) ==
- German Army Group B penetrated the northwest suburbs of Stalingrad.
- Laconia incident: A controversial event occurred when a USAAF B-24 Liberator attacked the U-156 while survivors rescued from the September 12 RMS Laconia sinking stood on the foredeck. The U-156 was forced to dive and abandon the survivors. Karl Dönitz shortly thereafter issued the Laconia Order, forbidding any such rescue work in the future.
- The National Liberation Movement, an Albanian resistance organization, was founded in Pezë.
- German submarine U-457 was sunk northeast of the North Cape by depth charges from the British destroyer Impulsive.

== September 17, 1942 (Thursday) ==
- Vidkun Quisling reintroduced the death penalty to the Norwegian criminal code.
- Masayuki Tani became the new Japanese Foreign Minister.
- The British submarine Talisman was lost in the Mediterranean, along with all 59 crew, while en route from French Algeria to Malta, after its path took it through Italian naval mines off of Sicily.
- The British war film In Which We Serve, directed by Noël Coward and David Lean, was released in the United Kingdom.
- Born:
  - Des Lynam, television and radio presenter, in Ennis, Ireland;
  - Lupe Ontiveros, actress, in El Paso, Texas (d. 2012)
- Died: Frank H. Buck, 54, American heir, businessman and politician

== September 18, 1942 (Friday) ==
- British Commandos concluded Operation Anglo successfully.
- British forces landed on the east coast of Madagascar and occupied Tamatave.
- The U.S. position on Guadalcanal improved with the arrival of the 7th Marine Regiment.
- The Rohwer War Relocation Center, a World War II Japanese American internment camp, opened in Desha County.
- Born:
  - Gabriella Ferri, singer, in Rome, Italy (d. 2004)
  - Wolfgang Schäuble, politician, in Freiburg im Breisgau, Germany (d. 2023)

== September 19, 1942 (Saturday) ==
- The RAF raided Saarbrücken and Munich but failed to do much damage.
- Born: Freda Payne, soul and R&B singer and actress, in Detroit, Michigan
- Died: Condé Montrose Nast, 69, American founder of the Condé Nast magazine publishing company

== September 20, 1942 (Sunday) ==
- German Army Group B captured Terek.
- Allied commanders set November 8 as D-Day for Operation Torch.
- Nazi authorities killed 116 people in Paris in retaliation for increasing attacks on German officers.
- The British destroyer Somali was torpedoed and mortally damaged in the Greenland Sea by German submarine U-255. Somali was taken under tow by destroyer HMS Ashanti but would sink four days later.
- Born: Rose Francine Rogombé, politician, in Lambaréné, French Equatorial Africa (d. 2015)

== September 21, 1942 (Monday) ==
- Operation Musketoon ended in Allied success with the destruction of the Glomfjord power plant.
- The German submarine U-446 struck a mine and sank near Kahlberg in the Gulf of Danzig, but would be raised and returned to service.
- The Boeing B-29 Superfortress had its first test flight.
- Born: Sam McDowell, baseball player, in Pittsburgh, Pennsylvania

== September 22, 1942 (Tuesday) ==
- The Germans occupied the center of Stalingrad.
- German submarine U-435 attacked Allied convoy QP 14 west of Jan Mayen Island and sank four ships.
- Born: David Stern, 4th Commissioner of the National Basketball Association, in New York City (d. 2020)
- Died: Ralph Adams Cram, 78, American architect

== September 23, 1942 (Wednesday) ==
- The first Actions along the Matanikau began around the Matanikau River on Guadalcanal.
- British forces occupied Antananarivo in Madagascar.
- Erwin Rommel left North Africa on sick leave, handing over command of the Afrika Korps to Georg Stumme.

== September 24, 1942 (Thursday) ==
- Hitler relieved Franz Halder as Chief of Staff of the OKH and replaced him with Kurt Zeitzler.
- German forces in Stalingrad broke through to the Volga River and cut the 62nd Army in two.
- Japanese forces landed on Maiana in the Gilbert Islands.
- The Baltimore and Ohio Railroad (B&O) train Ambassador train ran into the back of the Cleveland Express near Dickerson, Maryland, killing 12 passengers and two crewmen in the worst B&O accident since 1907.
- Born:
  - Danny, schlager singer, in Pori, Finland;
  - Gerry Marsden, musician, television personality and leader of Gerry and the Pacemakers, in Toxteth, Liverpool, England (d. 2021)

== September 25, 1942 (Friday) ==
- Four British de Havilland Mosquito bombers conducted the Oslo Mosquito raid, intended to boost morale of the Norwegian people. The operation failed as the Mosquito bombs failed to destroy the Gestapo HQ but caused 80 civilian casualties and one bomber was lost.
- The Oslo Mosquito raid against Gestapo HQ was scheduled to coincide with a rally of Norwegian collaborators, led by Vidkun Quisling; from September 25 to 27 his Norwegian Nazi party Nasjonal Samling ('National Unity') held its 8th national convention in Oslo, Norway.
- The German submarine U-253 sank in the Atlantic Ocean northwest of Iceland, with the most likely explanation being that it had struck a British naval mine.
- The aviation-themed action film Desperate Journey starring Errol Flynn and Ronald Reagan was released.

== September 26, 1942 (Saturday) ==
- The Manhattan Project was granted approval by the War Production Board to use the highest level of emergency procurement priority.
- The British destroyer Veteran was torpedoed and sunk in the Atlantic Ocean by German submarine U-404.
- Died: Kenneth D. Bailey, 31, U.S. Marine Corps officer (killed in action at Guadalcanal)

== September 27, 1942 (Sunday) ==
- The first Actions along the Matanikau ended in Japanese victory.
- The American Liberty ship Stephen Hopkins and the German auxiliary cruiser Stier shelled and sank each other in the South Atlantic Ocean.
- German submarine U-165 was depth charged and sunk in the Bay of Biscay by a Vickers Wellington aircraft of No. 311 Squadron RAF.
- The St. Louis Cardinals clinched the National League pennant by defeating the Chicago Cubs 9–2 in the first game of a doubleheader.
- Charlie Gehringer of the Detroit Tigers played in his final major league game, going 0-for-1 in a pinch hitting appearance against the Cleveland Indians.
- Died: Douglas Albert Munro, 22, Canadian-born member of the United States Coast Guard and posthumous recipient of the Medal of Honor (killed at Guadalcanal)

== September 28, 1942 (Monday) ==
- German forces started a new offensive in the Battle of Stalingrad, but made little progress.
- Joseph Stalin signed an instruction ordering the resumption of the Soviet nuclear research program which had been dormant for a year.
- Born: Marshall Bell, actor, in Tulsa, Oklahoma

== September 29, 1942 (Tuesday) ==
- British forces began Operation Braganza with the objective of capturing an area of ground near Deir el Munassib in Egypt.
- The second of the two Lookout Air Raids took place, but damage was again negligible.
- Born:
  - Yves Rénier, French actor and director (d. 2021).
  - Madeline Kahn, actress, comedian and singer, in Boston, Massachusetts (d. 1999);
  - Ian McShane, actor, director and producer, in Blackburn, Lancashire, England;
  - Jean-Luc Ponty, violinist and jazz composer, in Avranches, France
- Died:
  - Matangini Hazra, 71, Indian revolutionary (shot by British Indian police)

== September 30, 1942 (Wednesday) ==
- Operation Braganza was called off, having failed with 260 men killed.
- Hitler gave a speech in the Berlin Sportpalast informing his audience that "it will not be the Aryan peoples, but rather Jewry, that will be exterminated."
- Germany and Turkey signed a trade agreement.
- Born: Frankie Lymon, rock and roll and R&B singer and songwriter, in Harlem, New York (d. 1968)
- Died: Hans-Joachim Marseille, 22, German fighter ace, was killed in a plane crash.
