= Francis K. Butagira =

Ugandan lawyer, politician and diplomat

Ambassador Francis K. Butagira
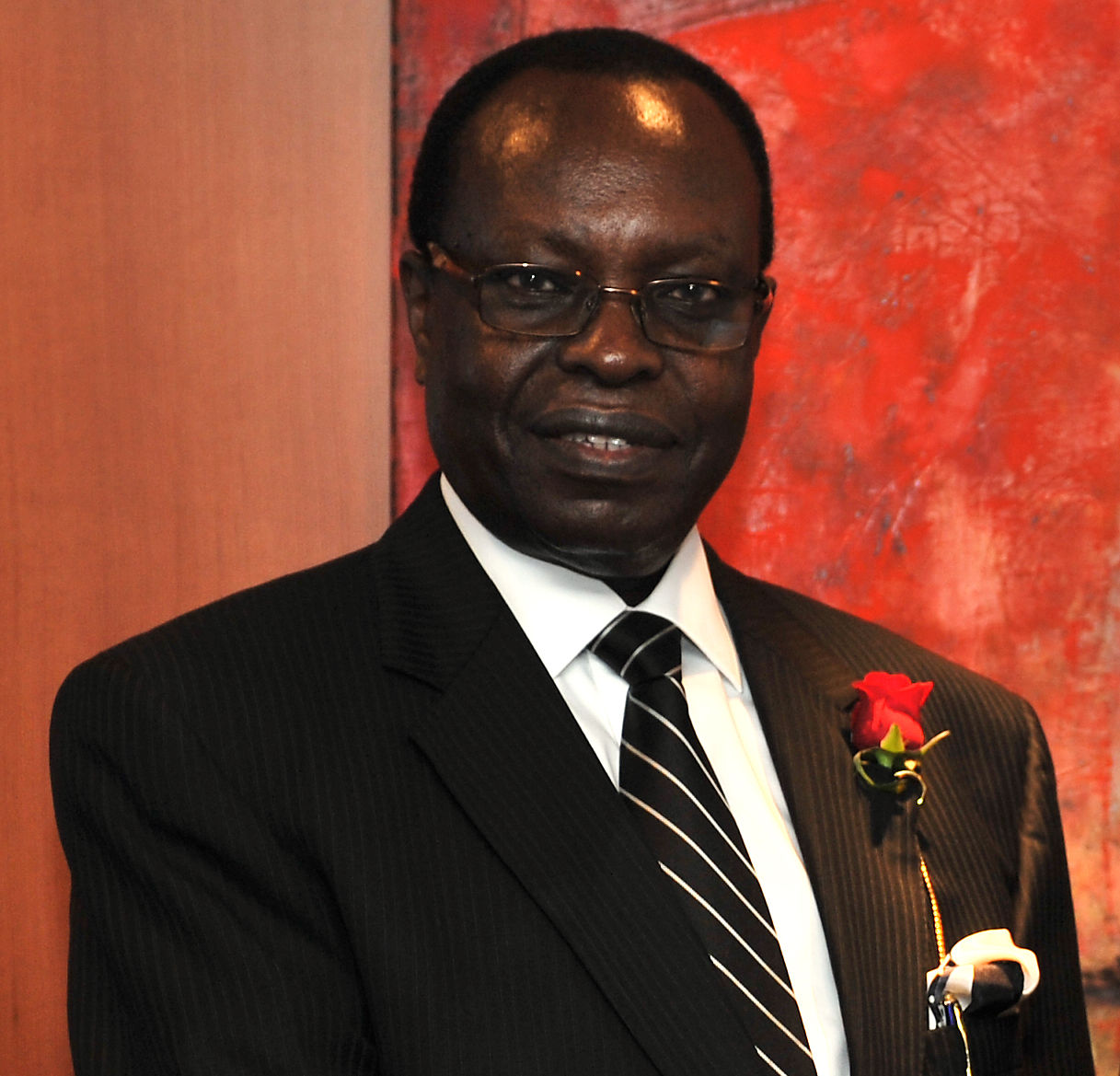
- Born: 22 November 1942 (age 83); Bugamba, Mbarara District, Uganda Protectorate
- Citizenship: Uganda
- Education: Ntare School (High School Diploma); University of Dar es Salaam (Bachelor of Laws); Law Development Centre (Diploma in Legal Practice); Harvard University (Master of Laws)
- Occupations: Lawyer, Politician & Diplomat
- Years active: since 1967
- Known for: Politics and Diplomacy
- Title: Chairman of Uganda Registration Services Bureau

Francis K. Butagira (born 22 November 1942) is a Ugandan lawyer, judge, politician and retired diplomat, who serves as the chairman of the Uganda Registration Services Bureau (URSB), an agency of the Ugandan government responsible for maintaining registration data. He was appointed to that position in October 2015. He concurrently serves as the Managing Partner of Butagira and Company Advocates, a Kampala-based legal practice.

Before that, he served as a Member of Parliament and as Speaker of the Ugandan Parliament (1980–1985). He has also served as Ambassador to Ethiopia, Kenya, Germany, Austria and the Vatican. He also served as the Permanent Representative of Uganda to the United Nations.

== Background and education ==
Butagira was born on 22 November 1942, in Bugamba, Rwampara District, in the Western Region of Uganda. He attended Ntare School in Mbarara, where he obtained the equivalent of the High School Diploma. Later, he studied at the University of Dar es Salaam and at Harvard Law School. He holds a Bachelor of Laws degree and a Master of Laws degree. He is a member of the Uganda Bar and an Advocate of the Supreme Court of Uganda and all subordinate Courts.

== Career ==
=== As a civil servant ===
He was a member of the National Consultative Council from 1979 to 1980 and a High Court judge between 1974 and 1979. In 1974, he was Chief Magistrate of Mbarara, and in 1973, of the Buganda Road Law Courts. He headed the Law Department at the Law Development Centre in 1969 and 1970, lectured in law at the Nsamizi Law School in 1968 and served as State Attorney for the Ugandan Ministry of Justice in 1967.

=== As a politician ===
Prior to his diplomatic assignments, he was Chairman of the Legal and Security Affairs Committee in the National Assembly of Uganda from 1989 to 1996. Butagira was speaker of the Parliament of Uganda between December 1980 and 1985. He served as President of the Joint Assembly of the European Economic Community and the African, Caribbean and Pacific Group of States (EEC/ACP).

=== Diplomatic activities ===
Butagira became the Permanent Representative to the United Nations in July 2003 after serving from 2000 as the mediator in Sudanese peace talks sponsored by the Intergovernmental Authority on Development (IGAD). In 1999, he led a team of Ugandan negotiators in talks leading to the establishment of the East African Community. He served in Nairobi as Uganda's High Commissioner and Permanent Representative to the United Nations Environment Programme (UNEP) and to the United Nations Human Settlements Programme (UN-HABITAT). In 1998, he was Uganda's Ambassador to Ethiopia and Permanent Representative to the Organization of African Unity (OAU) in Addis Ababa.

== See also ==
- Government of Uganda
- Francis Katana
