= Residence =

A residence is a place (normally a building) used as a home or dwelling, where people reside.

Residence or The Residence may also refer to:

- Domicile (law), a legal term for residence
- Habitual residence, a civil law term dealing with the status of refugees, and child abduction
- Residence in English family law, pertaining to where children should live in the case of disputes
- Student accommodation, commonly called residences, halls of residence, residence halls or (in the US) dormitories
- Residenz, the German term for the city palace of a noble family
- Tax residence, to determine the location of someone's home for tax purposes
- The Residence (TV series), a 2025 Netflix series
- The Residence (film), a 2025 film directed by Yann Gozlan
- The Residence (Woodberry Forest School), historic home in Woodberry Forest, Madison County, Virginia

== See also ==
- Reside, a real estate magazine
- Residency (disambiguation)
- Resident (disambiguation)
- Shelter (disambiguation)
