= Raid on Heath's Farm =

- Part of the New Guinea campaign, World War II
Date	1 July 1942
Location	Lae, Territory of New Guinea
Result	Australian victory

Belligerents
Australia	(Empire of Japan) Japan

Casualties and losses
Unknown	44

The Raid on Heath's Farm was conducted by Australian commandoes in New Guinea on 1 July 1942. It followed the Salamaua Raid and took place 7 miles (11 km) outside of Lae. 44 Japanese were killed.
