= Residency =

Residency may refer to:

- Artist-in-residence, a program to sponsor the residence and work of visual artists, writers, musicians, etc.
- Concert residency, a series of concerts performed at one venue
- Domicile (law), the act of establishing or maintaining a residence in a given place
  - Permanent residency, indefinite residence within a country despite not having citizenship
- Pharmacy residency, a stage of postgraduate pharmaceutical training
- Redshirt (college sports) or "serving residency" in the context of collegiate sports in the Philippines where a student transferring schools had to sit-out one season of playing time.
- Residency (administrative division), notably for indirect rule, in the British and Dutch colonial Empires
  - Residencies of British India, political offices in India managed by a Resident
- Residency (DJ), a salaried position as a DJ
- Residency (medicine), a stage of postgraduate medical training

== See also ==
- Diplomatic mission, the home of an ambassador
- Residence (disambiguation)
- Resident (disambiguation)
- The Residency (disambiguation)
