= Bugamba =

Ugandan settlement

- Location in Uganda
- Coordinates: 00°43′57″S 30°30′58″E
- Country: Uganda
- Region: Western Region
- District: Mbarara District
- Elevation: 4,938 ft (1,505 m)

Bugamba is an urban centre in the Western Region of Uganda. It is one of the trading centres in Mbarara District.

== Location ==
Bugamba is located in Bugamba sub-county, Rwampara District, approximately 27 kilometres (17 mi), by road, southwest of Mbarara, the nearest large city. This is approximately 60 kilometres (37 mi), by road, northwest of the town of Kikagati at the international border with Tanzania.

The geographical coordinates of Bugamba are:0°43'57.0"S, 30°30'58.0"E (Latitude:-0.732500; Longitude:30.516111). Bugamba sits at an average elevation of 1,505 metres (4,938 ft), above sea level.

== Overview ==
Bugamba Trading Centre hosts the headquarters of Bugamba sub-county, which, according to the 2014 national population census and household survey, was home to 35,202 people, of whom 18,066 were female and 17,136 were male.

== Prominent people ==
Bugamba is te birthplace of Francis K. Butagira, a lawyer, judge, politician and former ambassador. He served as Uganda's Ambassador to Austria, Ethiopia, Kenya, Germany, the United Nations and the Vatican.
