= Raid on Mubo (1942) =

The Raid on Mubo was a raid by Australian commandos on the Japanese base at Mubo in New Guinea in World War II conducted on 1 October 1942. A party of 60 soldiers from the 2/5th Commando Squadron (Australia) under Norman Winning attacked the Japanese base. It was estimated up to 50 Japanese were killed.
