= Statehouse =

State House or statehouse may refer to:

== Buildings ==
- Aso Villa or State House, the official residence of the President of Nigeria
- Government House, Dominica or The State House, the official residence of the President of Dominica
- State House, Barbados, the official residence of the President of Barbados
- State House, Bermuda, the original parliament building
- State House, Guyana, the official residence of the President of Guyana
- State House (Kenya), the official residence of the President of Kenya
- State House (Mauritius), the official residence of the President of the Republic of Mauritius
- State House of Namibia, the official residence of the President of Namibia
- State House (Pennsylvania), the official residence of the Lieutenant Governor of Pennsylvania
- State House, Seychelles, the official residence of the President of the Seychelles
- State House (Sierra Leone), the official residence of the President of the Sierra Leone
- State House (Tanzania), the official residence of the President of Tanzania
- State House (Uganda), the official residence of the President of Uganda
- State House (Zimbabwe), the official residence of the President of Zimbabwe in Harare
  - State House (Bulawayo), the official residence of the President of Zimbabwe in Bulawayo

== United States ==
- Capitol building of a U.S. state; see List of state capitols in the United States
  - Metonym for Governor (United States), chief executive officer of a state or territory
- Lower house of a state legislature (House of Representatives or House of Delegates); see List of U.S. state legislatures
  - Metonym for the State legislature (United States), the legislative body of a state

== Other uses ==
- State House (train), an American passenger train
- State housing, the government-owned public housing system in New Zealand

== See also ==
- Official residence, residence at which a nation's leader or other senior figure officially resides
