= BX convoys =

Convoys during naval battles of the Second World War

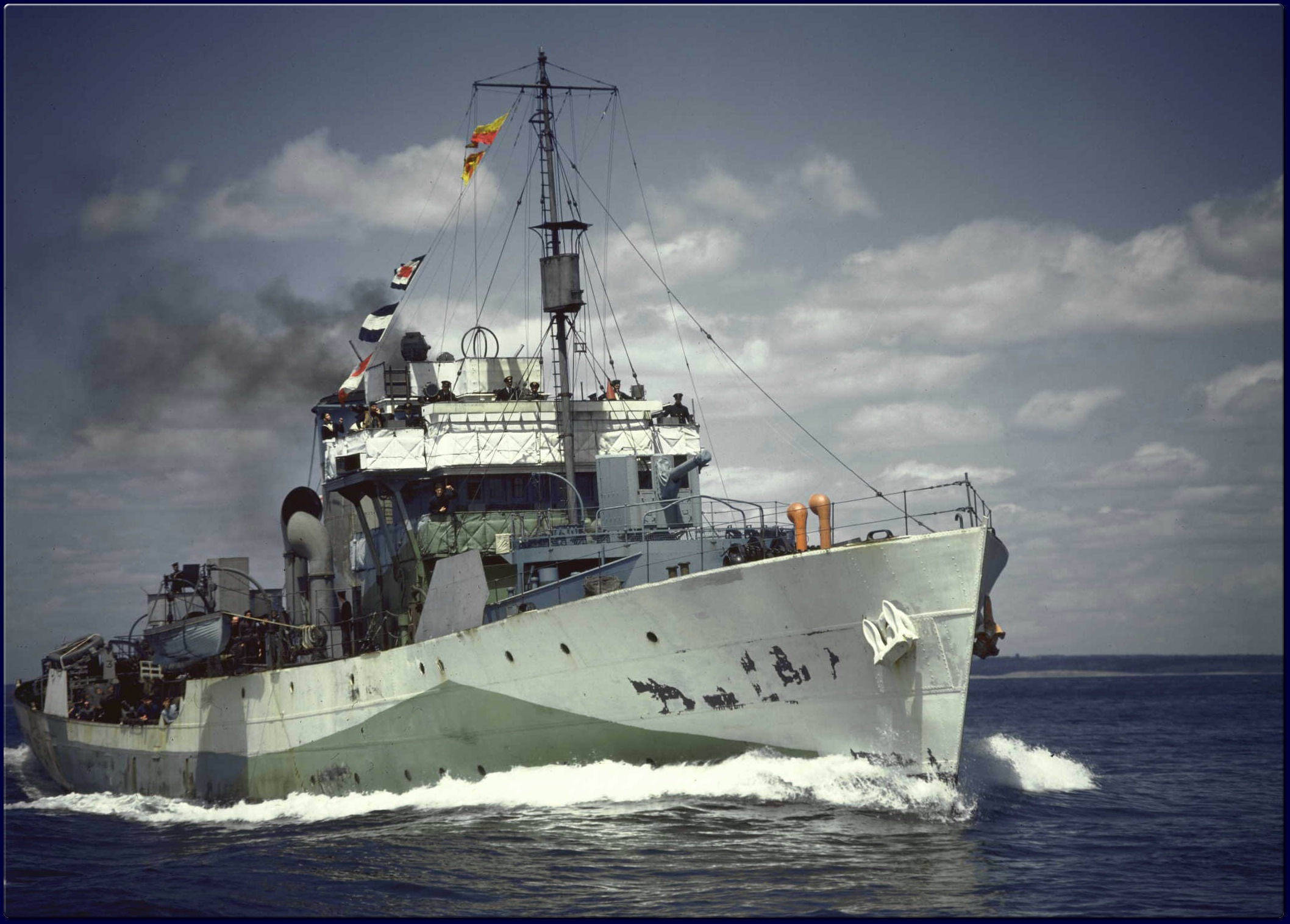
HMCS Regina escorted early BX convoys and rescued survivors from SS Alexander Macomb.

The BX convoys were a World War II series of convoys across the Gulf of Maine from Boston to Halifax. These convoys were escorted by the Western Local Escort Force (WLEF) of the Royal Canadian Navy to protect coastal shipping in transit between North American loading ports and trans-Atlantic convoy assembly points in Nova Scotia.

== Background ==
Allied war materials had been transported from North America to the United Kingdom in HX convoys since 1939 and in slower SC convoys since 1940. These convoys were escorted by the Royal Navy and Royal Canadian Navy. The United States Navy provided a few escorts to HX and SC convoys beginning in September 1941. Declaration of war on 8 December 1941 removed United States neutrality assertions which had previously protected trade shipping in the Western Atlantic. Although the United States was slow to convoy coastal shipping, the Royal Canadian Navy established the WLEF in February 1942.

== Loaded ships eastbound ==
WLEF escorted the first BX convoy from Saint John, New Brunswick, on 21 March 1942 and reached Halifax the following day. Ten of the first twelve BX convoys originated in Saint John. BX 4 was the first convoy originating in Boston on 3 April 1942, and BX 8 sailed from Boston on 18 April. BX 13 was the first convoy of the series to sail in multiple sections. The main convoy of eleven merchant ships left Boston on 3 May, and two ships left Saint John as convoy BX 13A on 5 May. BX 14 was the first of the series to sail from Portland, Maine, on 7 May. These early WLEF convoys sailed with as few as a single ship as the United States struggled to efficiently control sailing dates. BX 20 on 24 May was the first to include more than eleven ships. June convoys sailed in two sections with a main convoy like BX 25 with 43 ships leaving Boston on 17 June and a smaller convoy of seven ships leaving Boston two days later as BX 25B.

The Mystic Steamship Company's collier USS Stephen R. Jones was grounded and sank in the Cape Cod Canal on June 28, 1942. Temporary closure of the canal interrupted the flow of coastal shipping from Long Island Sound. Thirty-two ships of BX 27 left Buzzards Bay on 2 July, 15 ships of BX 27B left Boston on 3 July, BX 27C left Newport, Rhode Island on 4 July, four ships of BX 27D left Boston on 2 July, 2 ships of BX 27E left Portland on 1 July, and BX 27J left Saint John on 1 July. In the confusion, SS Alexander Macomb of BX 27 was torpedoed by U-215 on July 3 as the first loss from a BX convoy. The canal reopened on July 31, after the wrecked Stephen R. Jones was removed with the help of 17 tons of dynamite.

Five ships sailed from Saint John as convoy BX 28F on 8 July, followed by 48 ships from Boston on 9 July as BX 28, 8 ships from Boston on 10 July as BX 28B, and 3 ships from Boston on 11 July as BX 28C. This four-section pattern of one Bay of Fundy section and three Boston sections continued until the BX convoy series was temporarily suspended on 11 September 1942 by shifting assembly of HX convoys from Halifax to New York City.

The series resumed with convoy BX 38 from Boston on 25 March 1943 when the assembly point for SC convoys shifted from New York City to Sydney, Nova Scotia. For the remainder of the war, single-section BX convoys sailed at intervals of four to ten days collecting shipping from Gulf of Maine ports destined for SC convoys. Approximately 8 percent of the ships traveling in SC convoys loaded in the Gulf of Maine, including explosives loaded at Searsport, Maine.

The most damaging attack on a BX convoy was made by U-1232 on 14 January 1945. Convoy BX 141 was within visual range of Chebucto Head, Nova Scotia when Kapitän zur See Kurt Dobratz torpedoed the 6985-ton British tanker British Freedom at 1035, the 7176-ton American Liberty ship Martin van Buren at 1041, and the 8779-ton British tanker Athelviking at 1052. The two tankers sank, and the Liberty ship was destroyed by the surf after grounding. U-1232 managed to survive ramming by the River-class frigate HMCS Ettrick and escaped in difficult ASDIC conditions off Halifax.

Canadian warships of the WLEF escorted a total of 3464 ships across the Gulf of Maine in 206 BX convoys until convoy BX 164 made the last departure from Boston on 22 May 1945.

== Westbound shipping ==
Ships traveling westbound (often empty) on similar routes were designated XB convoys. A total of 2194 ships crossed the Gulf of Maine westbound in 196 XB convoys.
