= Robert Winsor =

American businessman (1858-1930)

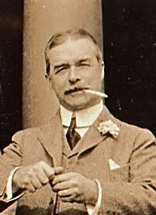
- Born: May 28, 1858; Salem, Massachusetts, U.S.
- Died: January 7, 1930 (aged 71); New York, New York
- Occupations: Financier, banker
- Spouse: Eleanor May Magee
- Children: 5
- Father: Frederik Winsor

Robert Winsor (May 28, 1858 – January 7, 1930) was a leading American financier, investment banker, and philanthropist who, as head of the Boston investment banking firm Kidder, Peabody & Co., was at the forefront of industrial consolidation during the period leading up to the Great Depression. After beginning his career at Kidder, Peabody in 1880 as a lowly clerk just out of college, Winsor was quickly promoted because of his business acumen, and was held in such great esteem by the 1920s that newspaper articles would refer to him as the "J.P. Morgan of Boston" and "one of the country's leading bankers."

Serving on the board of directors of several major corporations in various industries, particularly city railroads, mining, and utilities, Winsor was widely praised as a man of remarkable foresight, a man who had anticipated America's need for improved transportation, utilities, banking, and communications. Under Winsor's leadership, Kidder, Peabody developed from a local investment bank to one of the most powerful banking institutions in the world. He dominated his firm's operations until his sudden death in 1930, which nearly drove the firm out of business just after the Stock Market Crash.

Just after his death, a front-page story in the Boston Sunday Post declared Winsor “perhaps the greatest” of a group of same-aged business and political leaders (many of them classmates in the Harvard class of 1880), including Theodore Roosevelt, Josiah Quincy, Richard Saltonstall, Robert Bacon, and William A. Gaston, who had been responsible for building the country's banking, telephone, and transportation industries: “Winsor had the insight that saw the transportation needs of the last four decades. He saw the needs of and the demand for illuminating and heating gas. He saw the demand for communication.... He grasped their importance and he...found the men to develop them. Not only did he find the men, but he found the money, millions of money, for the developments. Robert Winsor, self-effacing, publicity-shy, hiding his activities under a firm name, that of Kidder, Peabody & Company, was one of those extraordinary men whom professors of biological sciences will tell you happens only when nature wishes to create a Gladstone, a Wilson, or a Morgan.”

== Early life ==
Robert Winsor was born in Salem, Massachusetts to Dr. Frederick Winsor, a Civil War surgeon descended from renowned shipbuilder Samuel Winsor, an early settler of Duxbury, Massachusetts, and teacher Ann Bent Ware, daughter of well-known Unitarian minister, professor and abolitionist Henry Ware Jr.

He was one of seven children, each of whom went on to great achievements — his brother Paul was chief engineer of Motive Power and Rolling Stock for the Boston Elevated Railway and was awarded a patent for a railway braking device he invented, sister Mary Pickard Winsor founded the Winsor School for girls in Boston, sister Elizabeth Pearson started the innovative Eliot-Pearson School for nursery school teachers at Tufts University, sister Annie Ware Winsor Allen founded the Roger Ascham School in White Plains, New York, sister Jane Gale directed the Friendly Society and founded the Toy Theatre in Boston, and youngest sibling Frederick Winsor founded the prestigious Middlesex School, of which he was headmaster for 37 years.

Robert Winsor grew up in a home that doubled as his mother's school, and was later educated at Phillips Exeter Academy, graduating from Harvard University in 1880. At Harvard, he played football (he was called "the prince of goal kickers") and was captain of the baseball team (famed for playing catcher against Yale without a mitt or mask, simply biting a piece of rubber between his teeth), but was by more than one account not the most rigorous of students.

== Career ==
=== Early years ===
After graduation, Winsor joined the Boston investment banking firm Kidder, Peabody & Co. as a clerk, but was quickly recognized for his business acumen, earning the highest Christmas bonus in the company in his first year as a result of his success. He worked his way up to the title of partner in just 14 years (1894), and later senior partner, the title he held at his death. This role also had him director of the Kidder companies of Lowell, Springfield, and New Bedford, Massachusetts, Kidder-Peabody Trust Company, and divisions of Kidder Participations, Incorporated.

=== Settling in Weston ===
Robert Winsor and his wife Eleanor settled in Weston, Massachusetts in 1883, buying a small plot of land at the corner of Boston Post Road and Hemlock Road where he built a simple shingle house (the first in Weston designed by a young architect named Samuel Mead). Over time, he would buy up adjoining properties, gradually laying out roads and building additional homes for his widowed mother and siblings and their families on a 472-acre estate called “Chestnut Farm,” the second largest holding in Weston, stretching from Wellesley to Summer Streets and cut through by Meadowbrook Road.

=== Railroad mergers ===
Winsor's first triumph was as director of the Boston Elevated Railway (which later became the Metropolitan Transit Authority) in 1894. The firm had been started as a speculative enterprise by financier Charles Whittier, but was little more than a weak collection of electric railroads in Boston and Cambridge, Massachusetts; the dominant street railway firm in the city was West End Street Railway, controlled by Henry Melville Whitney. By 1895, Winsor on behalf of Kidder, Peabody was able to gain control of both companies, reorganizing them into one unified public transit system of subways and surface and elevated lines serving metropolitan and suburban Boston. He was later a major influence in the financing of the New Haven Railroad system.

=== Bank mergers ===
During his early years as a partner with Kidder, Peabody, Winsor was also heavily involved in the formation of National Shawmut Bank of Boston in 1898–1899. A group of Massachusetts savings banks, dissatisfied with recent dividends on their shares in Boston's commercial banks, employed Kidder, Peabody to devise a consolidation plan; Winsor created a plan to merge nine of them into a syndicate headed by Kidder, Peabody to buy controlling shares in the banks, vote liquidation, and establish a successor corporation in which the savings banks would then invest. Although the plan drew protests both from the community and bank officials, Winsor moved forward, acquiring controlling shares to create National Shawmut Bank, which overnight became the largest bank in Boston, with twice the capital of the next largest bank.

=== Mining mergers ===
In the years leading up to World War I, Winsor also helped engineer a number of acquisitions and mergers involving mining and natural resources. In 1899 he participated in the transfer of the Butte Coalition Mining Company and the Clark Montana Realty Company to the Amalgamated Copper Mining Company, controlled by Henry H. Rogers and the "Standard Oil Crowd." He continued to work with Amalgamated until its sale in 1910 to the Anaconda Copper Company. In 1901, Kidder, Peabody participated with J.P. Morgan in the formation of the United States Steel Company, with Winsor serving on the steel company's board.

With J.L. Richards, Winsor in 1905 brought together the Massachusetts Pipe Line Gas Company, the Bay State Gas Company of Massachusetts, and the Boston, Brookline, Dorchester, Jamaica Plain, Roxbury, and South Boston gas companies into the $15 million Boston Consolidated Gas Company. At the time of its incorporation, all but a small portion of its capital stock was owned by the Massachusetts Gas Company, which eventually acquired complete control. Winsor was also a director of the New England Coal and Coke Company, which supplied a large portion of the gas sold by the Boston Consolidated Gas Company. Beyond mining and energy, Winsor also aided in the financing of various other New England industries, including the American Felt Company, the Amoskeag Manufacturing Company, and the Mystic Steamship Company.

=== World War I and changing economic times ===
During the war, Winsor led Kidder, Peabody in helping companies like AT&T and the Winchester Repeating Arms Company issue large numbers of bonds, and also participated in giving sizable loans to the Allies and Russia (a practice that banker Jacob Schiff, head of Kuhn Loeb, objected to). After 1919, Winsor became the leader of Kidder, Peabody's entire operation, and the man principally responsible for cultivating new business, organizing syndicates, and negotiating deals with other investment houses. Despite financial battles with J.P. Morgan, Winsor enjoyed a close personal relationship with the J.P. Morgan firm in New York, especially with his old Harvard classmate Robert Bacon and George Whitney, who had been a clerk with Kidder, Peabody.

But as the consumer-driven society exploded in the post-war years, Kidder, Peabody had trouble keeping up with the expansion, which was partly attributed to Winsor's autocratic leadership and inability or unwillingness to adapt to the changing times. Winsor would only leave Boston's State Street to travel to Kidder's New York office in the New York Stock Exchange Building once a week, and he still did not trust equities or the stock market, instead preferring to underwrite bonds, costing his firm both clients and millions of dollars in profit. (One exception was AT&T stock, which Winsor actively promoted; Charles Francis Adams wrote a letter to AT&T president Harry B. Thayer saying that he thought Winsor's firm had done a remarkable job of promoting the issue.)

=== Decline during the 1920s ===
Winsor's power and prestige had hidden serious problems at Kidder, Peabody that came to a head during the 1920s. As the banking and securities markets changed rapidly, becoming much more fast-paced and competitive, older firms like Kidder, Peabody were now forced to fight for their share of the business against younger, more aggressive firms.

For the most part, Kidder, Peabody clung to its traditional conservatism under the leadership of Winsor, who by this time was one of the last of the older financiers still actively engaged in the securities business. Winsor still ruled his firm single-handedly, making practically all the major decisions without consulting advisers or divulging the firm's exact financial condition or issuing any year-end statements. The firm's position deteriorated throughout the 1920s, until its name no longer appeared among the ten leading houses.

=== The Willet v Herrick case ===
Another factor in Winsor's downfall and failing health was his very prominent role as a defendant in the 'Willett v. Herrick and others' court case, which dragged on from 1921 through 1927, attracting as much attention in Boston as the simultaneous Sacco and Vanzetti murder trial. Although it was at its heart a simple civil suit, it involved a great deal of property and the reputations of some of Boston's most esteemed citizens, and like the Sacco/Vanzetti trial raised serious questions about the functioning of the Massachusetts courts.

In essence, George Willett, a successful self-made businessman and head of Willet, Sears & Co., felt he had been cheated out of his ownership of American Felt Company by a conspiracy of wealthy men. He in turn sued everyone involved (the richest, most prominent men in Boston) for damages to the tune of $15 million, the largest amount ever in a Massachusetts tort case. Robert Winsor was the oldest and most prominent defendant, and although Boston society found it difficult to believe the allegations against him, the jury disagreed, eventually awarding the plaintiff over $10 million. The ruling was eventually overturned on appeal, but the damage to Winsor's reputation, and failing health, was done.

=== The Stock Market collapse and Winsor's death ===
When the stock market crashed, Kidder, Peabody's true financial condition was revealed to the world. Most of the firm's capital at that time was tied up in securities of companies it had financed and reorganized, whose value had plummeted so much with the crash that many were completely unsellable, effectively freezing most of Kidder, Peabody's assets. Although the firm survived the crash, the company's informal structure proved crippling as many of its senior partners decided to retire, taking their capital with them. Winsor only exacerbated the problem by using his own capital to pay back many investor losses himself.

Once the situation went public, depositors began to withdraw their funds, creating a crisis when the Italian government suddenly withdrew $10 million. When Winsor died of a heart attack on January 7, 1930, just three months after the crash, the firm was skating on the edge of bankruptcy and was forced to accept a $10 million bailout from J.P. Morgan to survive. It was not enough, and Kidder, Peabody was soon completely reorganized under new partners.

== Legacy ==
Although Winsor's activities in New England received the most publicity at the time, his contributions on the national scene had a more lasting importance. During the first two decades of the twentieth century he was recognized as one of a small handful of powerful bankers connected with the houses of Kidder, Peabody, J.P. Morgan, Lee, Higginson, Kuhn, Loeb, First National Bank and National City Bank, who made up the core of "finance capitalism." Individually and collectively the group had enormous financial power, working together in syndicates, floating the securities of the largest American corporations, marketing them through allied trust and insurance companies and banking correspondents throughout the world, or placing them on the New York Stock Exchange. They became the permanent financial agents of large corporations, handling not only their financial affairs, but arranging mergers, combinations, reorganizations, and communities of interest.

In this role, Winsor served as director, at one time or another, of:

- Boston Elevated Railway
- National Shawmut Bank
- Amalgamated Copper Mining Company
- Massachusetts Gas Company
- Boston Consolidated Gas Company
- U.S. Steel Corporation
- Lime Rock Railroad
- Automatic Straight Air Brake
- Mystic Iron Works
- New England Manufacturing Company
- Rockland and Rockport Lime Company
- Daniel Green Felt Company
- U.S. Worsted Corporation
- Waltham Watch Company
- Winchester Company
- Winchester Repeating Arms
- Winchester-Simmons Company
- Union Mills
- Bigelow-Hartford Carpet
- Castner, Curran and Bullitt, Incorporated
- Union Trust Company
- Conveyancers Title Insurance and Mortgage
- Peabody Trust

Outside of the business world, Winsor was also a trustee of Phillips Exeter Academy, Middlesex School, and the Winsor School.

=== Careful development in Weston ===
Over the course of his life, Winsor carefully developed his 472-acre “Chestnut Farm” estate, the second largest holding in Weston, from a collection of properties to a gentleman's farm to support his family, and eventually a neighborhood of lots for houses of various sizes and styles. To maintain the property's natural beauty even as it was subdivided, Winsor first had the land planned and designed by the Olmsted Brothers landscape design firm to ensure the rolling wooded landscape would be preserved. (The notes of Frederick Law Olmsted Jr. from their meetings states that “He wants to keep the place quiet and natural.”) He also offered some of his land to create a skating/swimming pond and relocate the Meadowbrook School and the Weston Golf Club (designed by Donald Ross), boosting the value of his property immeasurably. (His property was one of the first in the country to incorporate golf fairways as a selling feature for adjoining residential property.) The Weston Real Estate Trust was selective in its sales, keeping lots at two acres or larger (creating the protective zoning followed by the town to this day), and even organizing a competition for architects to design homes to be built on the land.

=== Building a Utopian Community at Woodbourne ===
Before 1911, inspired by the plans of Edward Filene's "Boston-1915" project and others meant to address substandard housing and living conditions among the working class, Robert Winsor suggested the idea of building a "scientific, model residential enclave" for the conductors and motormen of his Boston Elevated Railway "as an alternative to the ills of urban housing and congestion," located "within fifteen minutes of the business center of Boston on a five cent fare." After studying several garden-based residential communities in London, Birmingham, Liverpool, and Germany, his hope was that such a community would serve as an “object lesson, which will lead others to make similar investments.”

On November 30, 1911, Winsor organized the Boston Dwelling House Company to develop a 30-acre site near the Forest Hills terminal “with the object of providing desirable, attractive, and sanitary homes at a moderate cost or rental for persons, desiring the same and for the purpose of acquiring the real estate." He put in place Henry Howard as president, his son and fellow Kidder, Peabody partner Robert Winsor Jr. as treasurer, and a board of directors that served as a list of the day's eminent political and social leaders: Robert Woods, William Henry Cardinal O'Connell, Frank A. Day, John Wells Farley, Frederick P. Fish, Bertha Hazard, Charles H. Jones, James Prendergast, James L. Richards, Mrs. Richard M. Saltonstall, Frederic E. Snow and Carl Dreyfus. Before building began, Winsor turned to landscape architects the Olmsted Brothers to design the tract; they delivered a plan similar to their work for Long Island's Forest Hills Gardens, also built near the railroad with naturalistic, winding streets that met in a large circle, which held a circular pool surrounded by larger public buildings. (The company, however, decided instead to go with another, cheaper designer, Robert Anderson Pope of New York, whose similarity to the Olmsted designs caused Frederick Law Olmsted Jr. to charge breach of contract.)

Although the development never met its goal of providing low-cost suburban housing for railroad workers (due to the quality of the construction and rising property costs, it quickly became an upper-middle-class neighborhood), the company sold off enough lots to make the development a marginal financial success. Some of the original plan and homes were lost, but the area in Jamaica Plain, now recognized as the Woodbourne Historic District with its old-growth trees, set-back model houses and harmonious curvilinear designs following the topography and landscape, remains a testimony to the housing styles, trends and idealistic development practices of the early twentieth century. The District is located in the northeast section of Jamaica Plain, encompassing Walk Hill Street, Bourne Street, Florian Street, Wachusett Street and Goodway Road.
