= K234 =

K234 or K-234 may refer to:

- K-234 (Kansas highway), a state highway in Kansas
- HMCS Regina (K234), a former Canadian Navy ship
