= Annie Ware Winsor Allen =

American educator (1865–1955)

- Born: Annie Ware Winsor; May 26, 1865; Winchester, Massachusetts, U.S.
- Died: December 26, 1955 (aged 90); Des Moines, Iowa, U.S.
- Education: Radcliffe College
- Occupation: Educator
- Known for: Founding the Rodger Ascham School

Annie Ware Winsor Allen (26 May 1865 - 26 December 1955) was an educator and founder of the Rodger Ascham School in White Plains, New York. She was the fourth child of seven born to Frederick Winsor and Ann Bent Ware Winsor. She was also the sister of Robert Winsor, an American financier and investment banker, and relative of Henry Ware (Unitarian).

== Early life and education ==
Annie Ware Winsor was born in Winchester, Massachusetts on May 26, 1865. Her parents were Frederick Winsor and Ann Bent Ware. She graduated from Winchester High School in 1881, and taught there until 1883 when she left to attend Radcliffe College in Cambridge, Massachusetts. After 2 years, she had to leave Radcliffe, but reentered in 1886 and was there until 1889. While she was a student at the school, she also taught college classes and was very active in student organizations. However, despite the time she spent at the school, she never received a degree because she had not met the entry requirements and/or graduation requirements.

== Work and marriage ==
After leaving Radcliffe, Annie Ware Winsor found herself in New York City where she taught at the Brearley School for girls. While in New York, she was an active member of the People's Choral Union of New York, and the Social Reform Club of New York. It is through her work in the Social Reform Club, that she became a tutor for Leonora O'Reilly, an organizer for the New York Women's Trade Union League.

While in New York, Winsor lived with her Uncle, William R. Ware, in a boarding house he had. In 1897 they rented a house, and invited Annie's distant cousin, Joseph Allen, to live with them. Allen had earned both his A.B. and A.M. in mathematics from Harvard University, and continued with his graduate work until 1894, when he left the school to take up a teaching position at Cornell University. He left Cornell in 1897, and taught at the City College of New York until 1940.

Annie Ware Winsor and Joseph Allen became engaged in 1899, and married in 1900. They continued to live in New York and had had three children by 1905: Dorothea Teulon (later Treadway), (1901–1994), Annie (Nancy) Winsor (1902–1993), and Joseph ("Jay"), Jr. (1905–1975). A fourth child, David, died after one week in 1906.

In 1906, Annie Ware Winsor Allen moved, with her family, to White Plains, New York. Upon moving to the city, Annie became dissatisfied with the education system, and started homeschooling her children, and later neighbors' children. The next year, 1907, Annie founded the Roger Ascham School, which was a progressive, co-education school that included all grades from first to high school. Eventually, the school moved to Scarsdale, but returned to White Plains. A branch also opened in New York City. From 1907, until the school's closure in 1933, Annie Ware Winsor Allen served as its head mistress.

During her tenure as head mistress, Winsor Allen also helped to establish the Head Mistresses' Association of the East.

After her school closed, Winsor Allen started writing articles in the Ladies Home Journal, and other magazines. She primarily wrote articles about education and adolescent behavior, and had a column in the Ladies Home Journal in which she gave advice to parents. She often wrote under the pseudonym Marion Sprague, as well. She also wrote four books: Home, School and Vacation (1907), Psyche's Primer (1935), All of Us (1942), and Without and Within (1952).

== Retirement ==
In 1945, the Allens' retired to Des Moins, Iowa, where they lived with their daughter Dorothea and her family. In 1946, Joseph died and Annie spent her time between Des Moins and Chicago, where her other daughter, Annie Winsor Allen, was principal of the Girls' Latin School. In 1954, Annie Ware Winsor Allen moved with her daughter, Annie Winsor Allen, to Nashville, Tennessee after she accepted a position to become Dean of Women at Fisk University. She remained there until her death in December 1955.
