= James Lorin Richards =

J.L. Richards
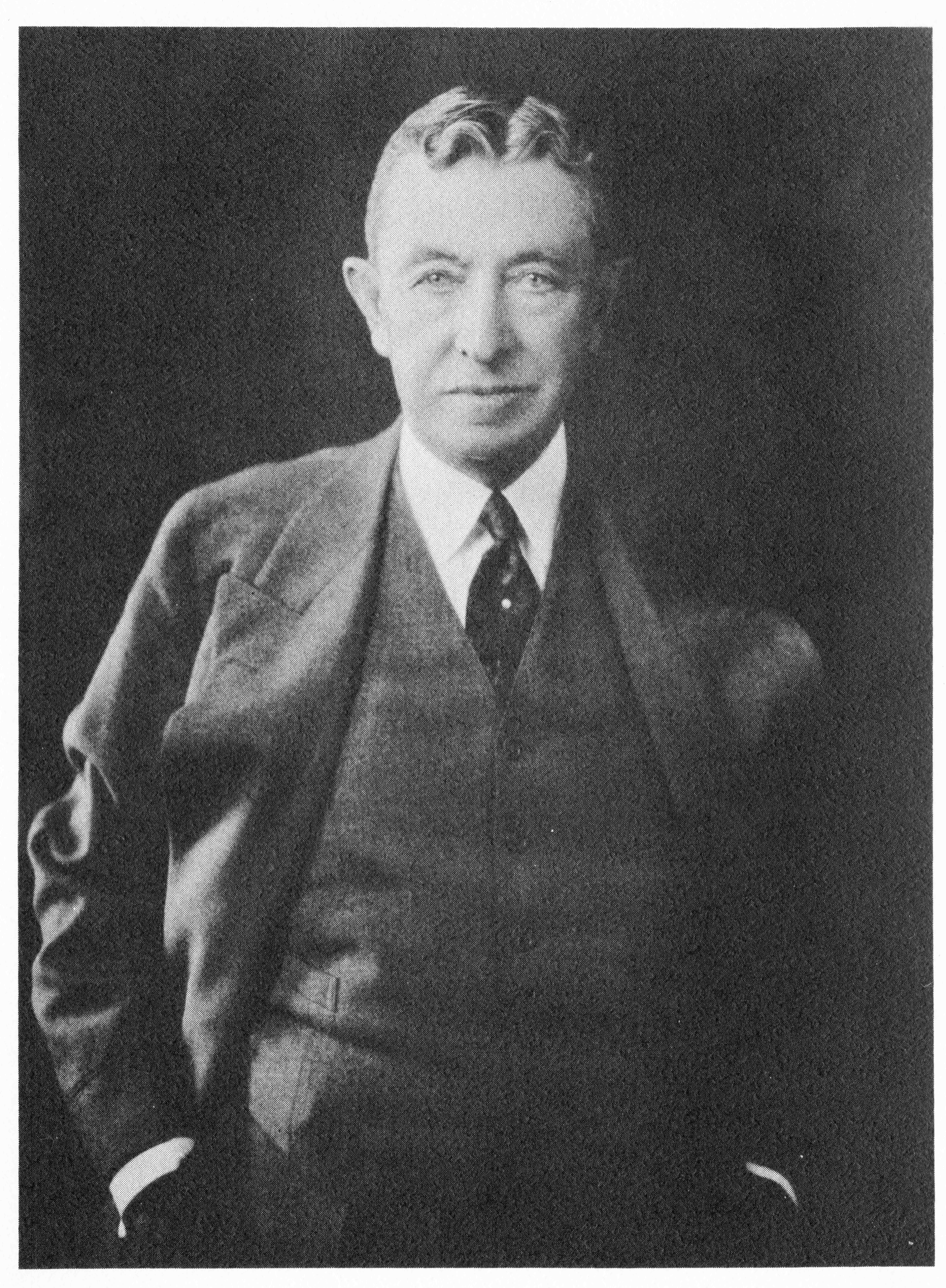
- Born: January 8, 1858; East Longmeadow, Massachusetts
- Died: January 2, 1955 (aged 96); Newton, Massachusetts
- Occupations: Financier, industrialist
- Spouse: Cora E. Towne
- Children: Edwin M., Ruth S.

James Lorin Richards (January 8, 1858 – January 2, 1955) was an American financier and industrialist based in Boston, Massachusetts.

== Early life ==
Richards was born on a farm in East Longmeadow, Massachusetts, the son of Rodolphus Palford and Sarah E. (Burt) Richards. He never finished high school. Instead, in 1875 at age 17 he moved to Boston to learn the wholesale tobacco trade under a family friend.

== Tobacco ==
In 1875 at age 17 he moved to Boston to learn the wholesale tobacco trade as a salesman under A.R. Mitchell, a tobacco merchant and family friend. When Mitchell retired in 1897, the firm was continued by Richards and a partner, George W. Stinson, until 1903. By 1900 Richards had gotten into manufacturing when he organized the Harry Weissinger Tobacco Company of Louisville, Ky. with Harry Weissinger, John Middleton, J.W. O'Bannon, F.B. Phillips and H.W. Keisker of Louisville, and George W. Stinson of Boston (Boston Globe, Jan. 26, 1900), (New Tobacco Company. Richmond Dispatch, Mar. 25, 1902.) He became a director for the Universal Tobacco Company, 1901–1904.

The Directorate of the Universal Tobacco Company, "it is understood, will include Gen. E.A. McAlpin, Ferdinand Hirsch, George R. Sheldon, W.D. Judkins, J.L. Richards, and Frank Tilford. The company is said to have the backing of a number of strong financial interests." (Universal Tobacco Company. New York Times, May 21, 1901.) They chose as president William H. Butler, who had been "one of the organizers of the American Tobacco Company, and afterward President of the Union Tobacco Company at the time it was bought by the American Company." (Tobacco Company's President. New York Times, May 24, 1901.) Universal bought out the McAlpin factory of New York and the Harry Weissinger tobacco factory of Louisville, Ky., and was negotiating for the Piper Company of St. Louis, Nall & Williams in Louisville, and the Pall Mall cigarette factory. (Tobacco Factory Sold. New York Times, Aug. 19, 1901.) Weissinger was elected to the Universal board. (Universal Tobacco Company. New York Times, Oct. 9, 1901.) D.H. McAlpin & Co. actually went to the Consolidated Tobacco Company. (Tobacco Trust Gets D.H. M'Alpin & Co. New York Times, Nov. 22, 1901.) The Universal Tobacco Company was incorporated in New Jersey by Samuel L. Pinkerton, Thomas L. Prior, and Wendell J. Wright. (The Tobacco Situation. New York Times, Nov. 23, 1901.)

== Railways, railroads and public utilities ==
In 1892, Richards began investing in trolley systems, including the Wellesley & Boston, Newton & Boston and Newtonville & Watertown electric railways. Recent legislation had given Boston Elevated Railway authority to consolidate as well. Boston Elevated was being co-managed by Robert Winsor. In 1897 Richards and Winsor crossed paths. They were at odds over the consolidation of several of these smaller railways, but the main focus was the road of the Newtonville and Watertown. Winsor, backed by Kidder, Peabody was trying to build his railway which competed directly with Richards plan. When Winsor offered to buy him out, Richards passed. When Winsor launched a negative publicity campaign, the stock of the Newtonville & Watertown began dropping. Slowly but steadily Richards accumulated these shares, over time giving him complete control of the Newtonville & Watertown road. When Winsor figured out what was happening he again offered to buy Richards out. Richards ultimately agreed, but at a far greater premium than the first offer.

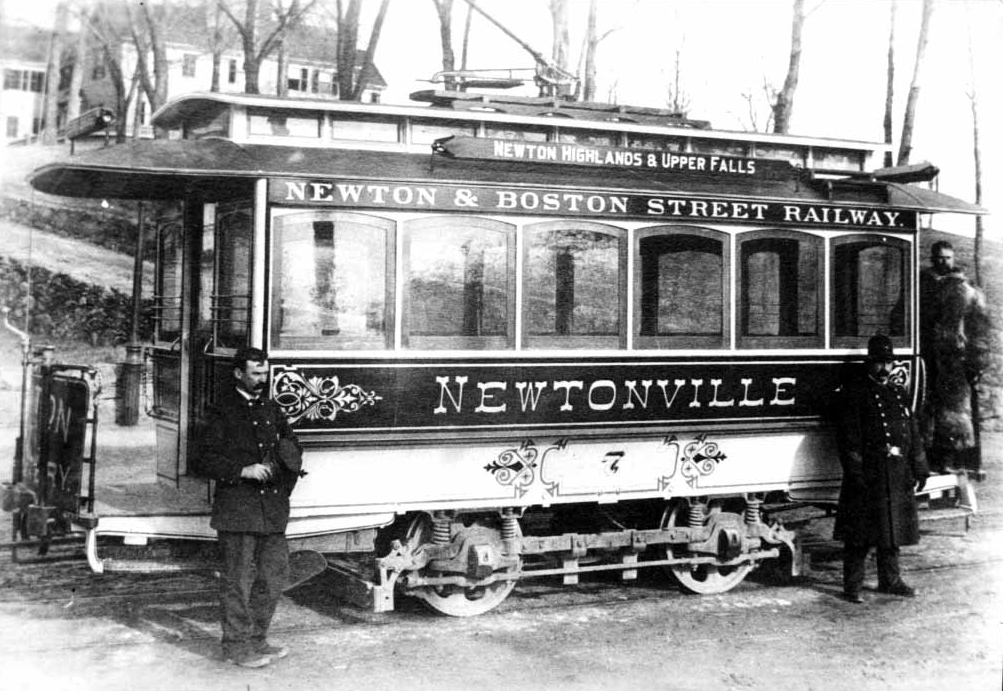
Newton and Boston Electric Railcar before 1909

After the battle with Boston Elevated was settled, Richards increased his holdings in a handful of other suburban railways: the South Middlesex, Natick and Cochituate, Westboro and Waltham, and Lexington and Boston. Management had run these lines into a poor financial state as well. After careful planning, Richards took his plan directly to the public. It took 5 months of selling this idea but he successfully convinced the public to raise fares from 5 to 6 cents. One of the key turning points was when the public learned he took no salary. "He kept no secrets from the public, and the public granted him their confidence in return". Eventually, most would be folded into the Boston Suburban Electric Companies

== New York, New Haven and Hartford Railroad ==
In 1913 the New York, New Haven and Hartford Railroad commonly referred to as the "New Haven" had been struggling for several reasons: an Interstate Commerce Investigation, an unusually high frequency of wrecks causing great loss of life, poor management, a growing distrust from the public under intensifying criticism, and two lawsuits resulting in the indictment of former president New Haven Charles S. Melee. The stock had been struggling as well, from a peak of 279 a few years earlier, by December it was now hitting 67 3/8. Then to make matters worse, for the first time in 40 years the dividend was skipped. J.L. Richards was invited on October 22, 1913, to join the 27-man board of directors. This pedigreed group included Arthur T. Hadley of Yale, William Rockefeller and J.P. Morgan of New York. Richards used his previous railroad knowledge studying the company's history very carefully. He concluded the company could be turned around. He bought more and more stock as the price was depressed. Soon he became the largest individual stockholder in the company. Early in 1914, Richards was named to the executive committee to replace J.P. Morgan.

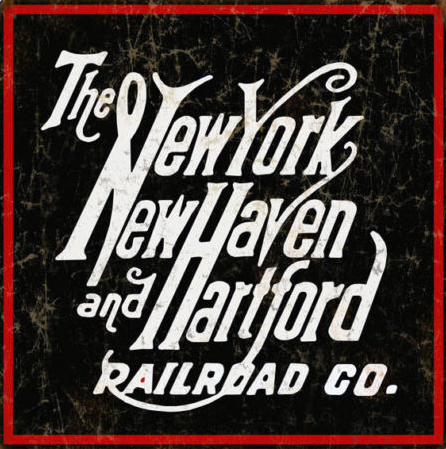

Coined the "European Loan", the $23,000,000 loan to the “New Haven” from a French company would mature on April 21, 1925. Richards wanted to either retire the loan, renew it, or float a domestic bond in its place. Even though the New Haven's balance sheet was looking better since those tenuous days in 1913, most bankers were reluctant to take on a debt this large. When the Boston finance team, headed up by Richards, met the New York bankers at the House of Morgan, J.P. Morgan himself warned “If you can get the money enough to pay down 10% of the loan and get an extension for the balance, you will be fortunate. The commission charges on a bond issue for $23,000,000 would be tremendous, if such an issue could be sold at all.”

Richards fired back “Mr Morgan, I do not agree with you at all. We will have the amount of this loan not only subscribed-but oversubscribed. I'll sell the bond issue myself, and it won’t cost the New Haven one cent for commission charges.” The morning after his return from the New York meeting, he got to work calling on his circle of bankers, individuals, trust and insurance companies. Out of 64 calls, he sold subscriptions to 62 of them. Richards understood how important keeping the New Haven running: it employed hundreds of people directly, thousands of people indirectly, and was a vital conduit for New England in general. Business leaders and civic minded people alike understood this and supported it. This enthusiasm led to the issue being oversubscribed; the issue closed when the offers to buy reached a total of $31,574,900. Those who held these bonds received 6% interest and were paid in full when the bonds were retired. On July 20, 1948, J.L. Richards retired as a director. He had been a director of the New York, New Haven and Hartford Railroad for thirty-five years and was 90 years old. That very same day the company adopted the following minute:

"The announcement of the resignation of James L. Richards as Director is received with great regret. Since October 22, 1913, he has served continuously both as Director and member of the Executive Committee. He brought to the board a wealth of business experience and his wise counsel has been invaluable in directing the affairs of this company. An outstanding contribution was in 1925 when the company was faced with the necessity of funding the French loan of $23,000,000. Upon his advice and personal solicitation the banks and industries in the territory of the Company joined with the officers and employees so that the loan was oversubscribed. Mr Richards was a member of the committee upon whom fell the burden of preparing and consummating a reorganization plan. With the return of the Company’s property to private control he was named as a member of the new Board of Directors. “His conception of the duties of a Director measured up to the highest standards of law and morality, a standard from which he never deviated. His retirement carries with it the esteem and affection of his associates."

== Coal, coke and gas ==
In 1904, at the request of Robert Winsor, Richards was asked to assist Kidder Peabody in the consolidation of a number of smaller Boston gas companies. (Boston Gas Light Company, Roxbury Gas Light Company, South Boston Gas Light Company, Bay State Gas Company, Brookline Gas Light Company, Dorcester Gas Light Company, Jamaica Plain Gas Light Company and the Massachusetts Pipe Line Company). Crosscurrents arose with all kinds of objections, including the Public Franchise League. He persevered, and one by one Richards won them over. Richards was so deeply concerned with customer service he required every single complaint that came in to be put on his desk for follow-up Each objection was countered with the highest visibility of the company's finances, goals, diligence, and commitment and he successfully brought them all together in 1905 under the new moniker, the Boston Consolidated Gas Company.

The very first year Boston Consolidated lowered the retail price of gas, then surprised shareholders with a dividend payment. Then he started branching out vertically. Just like tobacco, he identified a cheap source, in this case coal from the Fairmont Field in West Virginia, then improved upon and/or streamlined the distribution channels right up to the end user. Consolidated would then buy many of the service and support companies: steamers, tugs, barges and coal plants, etc., and in many instances he would design a better alternative than what had been used in the past. Until shortly before his death in 1955, he had been chairman of the board of the Boston Consolidated Gas Company for over 45 years.

== Innovations and improvements ==
- Using newly designed Coal Collier ships that left from Newport News, VA instead of using traditional rail lines. This revolutionized coal transportation.
- When threatened with coal mining strikes, he discovered coke was as good or better in the water gas generators.
- In 1908 the creation and implementation of the first Employee Participation Profit Sharing, (Boston Consolidated Gas Co.), Although this concept originated at Consolidated, it was widely adopted nationally.
- Credited in 1920 with the founding of New England's first oil refinery (Beacon Oil Company) and blast furnace (New England Gas & Coke-1899)
- Was first to recommend employees have representation on company boards.(Boston Consolidated Gas Co.)

== Shipping and shipbuilder ==
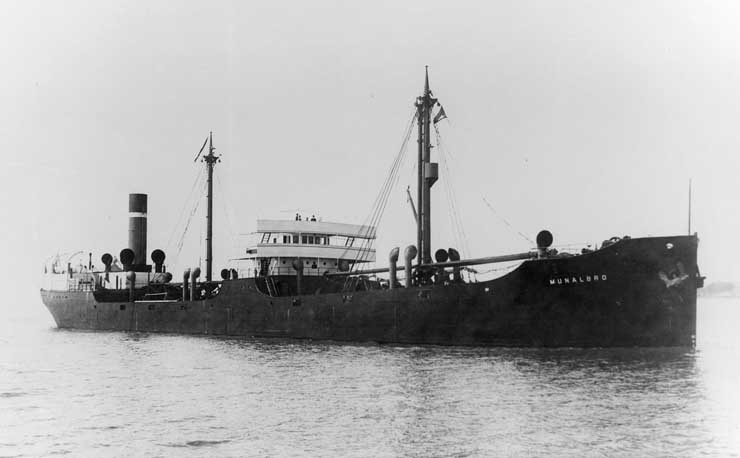
In commercial service as SS Munalbro 1916-1918 and 1919-1936 and as SS James L. Richards 1936-1954

Boston Towboat had been founded in 1857 as T-Wharf Towing. At the time it was owned by a company called the Mystic Steamship Company. Mystic Steamship operated coal carrying colliers, transporting coal to and from east coast ports such as New York, New York; Baltimore, Maryland; and Newport News, Virginia. However, on June 30, 1917, ownership changed hands when T-Wharf towing was absorbed to consolidate several commercial enterprises controlled by Massachusetts Gas Cos. The new company, New England Fuel And Transportation, of which J.L. Richards was CEO and a trustee, took over the assets and liabilities of The New England Gas and Coke Co., Boston Tow Boat Co., Federal Coal and Coke Co., and the assets, liabilities and business of the New England Coal and Coke Co., pertaining to the transportation of coal such as its fleet of steamers, tugs and barges, its coal plants at Everett and Beverly, and its stock interest of 2000 shares (60%) in the J.B.B Coal co.

The U.S. Navy acquired Munalbro from Munson Steamship Lines for World War I service as a cargo ship on 17 September 1918 and commissioned her as USS Munalbro at Newport News the same day with Lieutenant Commander F. E. Cross, USNRF, in command. Unlike many of the former merchant ships the Navy acquired in 1917 and 1918 for use in the war, Munalbro did not receive a Navy identification number (Id. No.). On 21 March 1919 Munalbro decommissioned and was delivered to the United States Shipping Board for simultaneous return to Munson Steamship Lines. She returned to mercantile service as SS Munalbro. Boston enterprise Eastern Gas And Fuel purchased the steamship, converted for coal, and in 1936 her name was changed to SS James L. Richards on behalf of longtime EG&F director James Lorin Richards. Her subsequent commercial service extended for three and a half decades and she was scrapped in 1954.

== Real estate ==
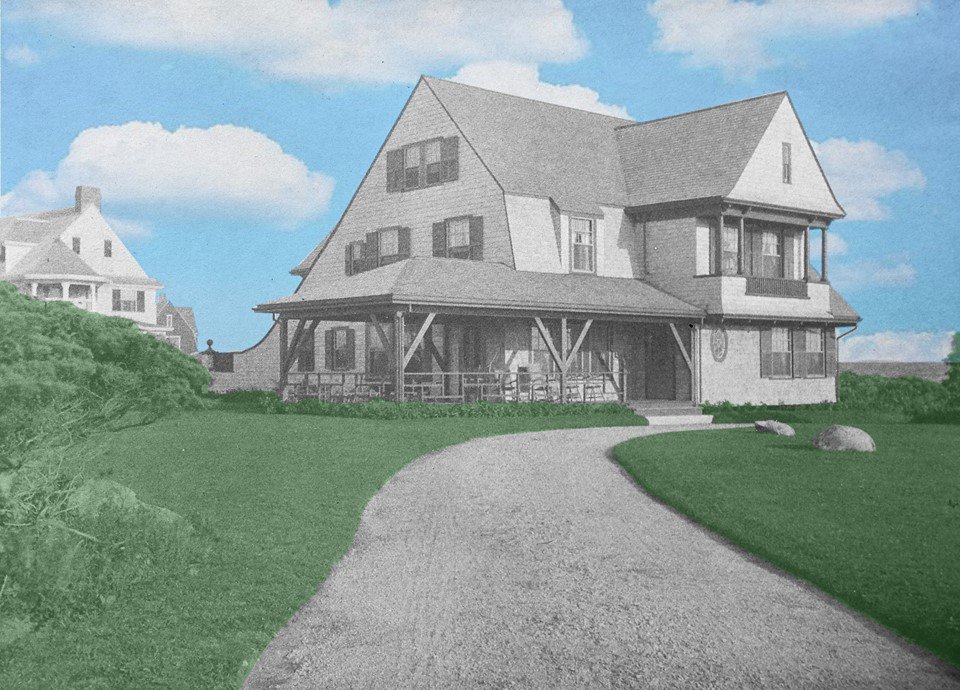
Guest house of J.L. Richards on Chapoquoit Island, Cape Cod

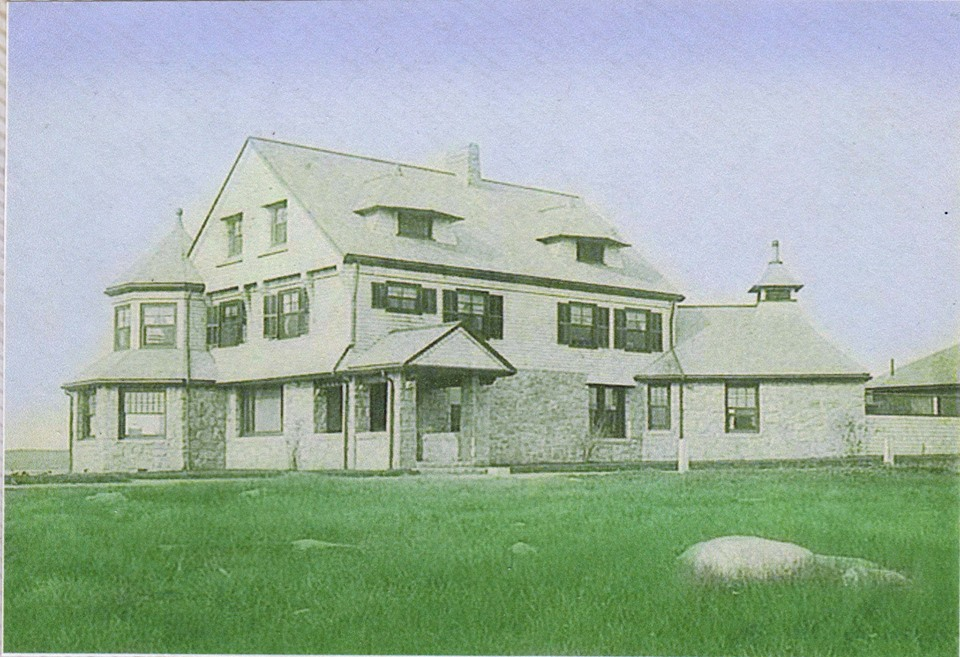
Main house of J.L. Richards on Chapoquoit Island, Cape Cod

Located in West Falmouth, Massachusetts, Chapoquoit Island was previously known as "Hog Island"; the name Chapoquoit is thought to have been modeled after that of a band from a local Native American tribe, the Chappaquiddick Wampanoag.

Richards had 3 summer homes on the island. Two are pictured. The third home was where the crew of the "Dorcas", Richards yacht stayed. Many were landscaped by Frederick Law Olmsted. Chapoquoit was developed by Boston business magnate, Charles Henry Jones, and in many cases the homes have remained in the same families for generations.

== Philanthropy ==
Richards had a profound impact on Boston. His philanthropy, although mostly anonymous, was far-reaching, including generous contributions to the Boston Police Dept. and Northeastern University. Perhaps the most enduring was his unwavering commitment to Northeastern, especially in its formative stages. The university began as evening education for employed young men, conducted by the Boston Young Men's Christian Association. When it was incorporated in 1904, the legislative act provided that four of its seven directors would be members of the board of directors of the Boston YMCA. "The formal organization of the Northeastern University Corporation, the most important single event in the evolution of Northeastern's structure, took place on January 22, 1937, at a dinner meeting at which James L. Richards was host and chairman."

== See also ==
- Boston Elevated Railway
- James Lorin Richards House
- Middlesex and Boston Street Railway
- New York, New Haven and Hartford Railroad
- SS James L. Richards (formerly USS Munalbro)
