= Alexander Macomb =

Alexander Macomb may refer to:

- Alexander Macomb (merchant) (1748–1831), American merchant and land speculator
- Alexander Macomb (general) (1782–1841), Commanding General of the US Army, 1828–1841
- SS Alexander Macomb, a World War II liberty ship
