= USS Munalbro =

Cargo ship of the United States Navy

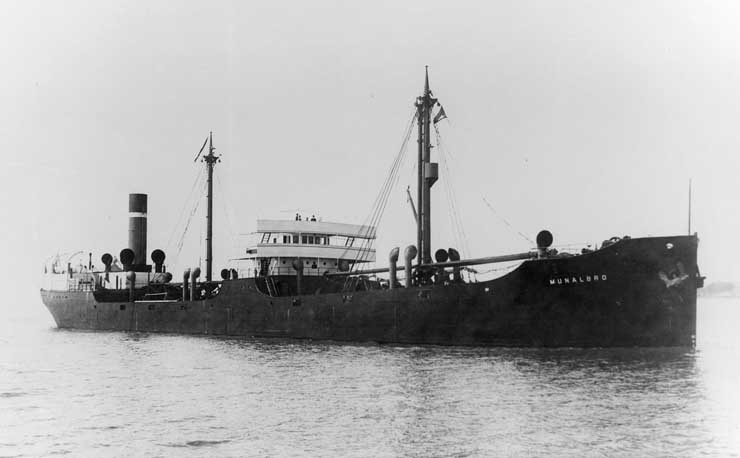
- USS MunalbroCollier SS Munalbro shortly after completion in 1916.

History

United States
- Name: USS Munalbro
- Namesake: Previous name retained
- Builder: Newport News Shipbuilding and Drydock Company, Newport News, Virginia
- Launched: 6 May 1916
- Completed: 1916
- Acquired: 17 September 1918
- Commissioned: 17 September 1918
- Decommissioned: 21 March 1919
- Fate: Returned to owners 1919; scrapped 1954
- Notes: In commercial service as SS Munalbro 1916-1918 and 1919-1936 and as SS James L. Richards 1936-1954

General characteristics
- Type: Cargo ship
- Tonnage: 4,293 Gross register tons
- Displacement: 9,220 tons
- Length: 375 ft (114 m)
- Beam: 49 ft 0 in (14.94 m)
- Draft: 25 ft 0 in (7.62 m)
- Depth: 26 ft 11 in (8.20 m)
- Propulsion: Steam engine
- Speed: 10 knots
- Complement: 53
- Armament: 2 × 3-inch (76.2-millimeter) guns

USS Munalbro was a cargo ship that served in the United States Navy from 1918 to 1919.

Munalbro was built as a collier by the Newport News Shipbuilding and Drydock Company at Newport News, Virginia, in 1916, and went into commercial service with Munson Steamship Line as SS Munalbro.

In September 1917 Munalbro was chartered by the United States Army, and by December 1917 she had been armed. On 12 May 1918 she was in a convoy on a crossing from New York City to Plymouth, England, when the U.S. Navy cargo ship USS Zaanland (ID-2746) suffered a rudder casualty that evening, went off course, and was rammed by the U.S. Navy tanker USS Hisko (ID-1953). While the convoy continued on its way, Munalbro stood by the mortally damaged Zaanland—which sank the next morning—and took off her crew. Munalbro then set off to catch up with the convoy. Along the way she encountered the westward-bound merchant ship SS Minnesota and transferred the crew of Zaanland to Minnesota for transportation back to the United States.

The U.S. Navy acquired Munalbro from Munson Steamship Line for World War I service as a cargo ship on 17 September 1918 and commissioned her as USS Munalbro at Newport News the same day. Unlike many of the former merchant ships the Navy acquired in 1917 and 1918 for use in the war, Munalbro did not receive a Navy identification number (Id. No.).

Assigned to the Naval Overseas Transportation Service (NOTS), Munalbro joined a convoy at New York City bound for Europe on 26 September 1918. She arrived at La Pallice, France, on 13 October 1918 to discharge part of her U.S. Army general cargo and continued on to St. Nazaire, Nantes, and Quiberon. She departed Quiberon 1 November 1918 for the United States East Coast and arrived at Norfolk, Virginia, on 22 November 1918. On 12 December 1918 Munalbro made a second crossing to Quiberon, where she arrived in January 1919, again carrying general U.S. Army supplies. In February 1919 she departed Nantes with another U.S. Army cargo, returning to New York on 1 March 1919.

On 21 March 1919 Munalbro decommissioned and was delivered to the United States Shipping Board for simultaneous return to Munson Steamship Line. She returned to mercantile service as SS Munalbro. Boston enterprise Eastern Gas And Fuel purchased the steamship, and in 1936 her name was changed to SS James L. Richards on behalf of longtime EG&F director James Lorin Richards. Her subsequent commercial service extended for three and a half decades and she was scrapped in 1954.
