= SS Alexander Macomb =

Liberty ship of WWII

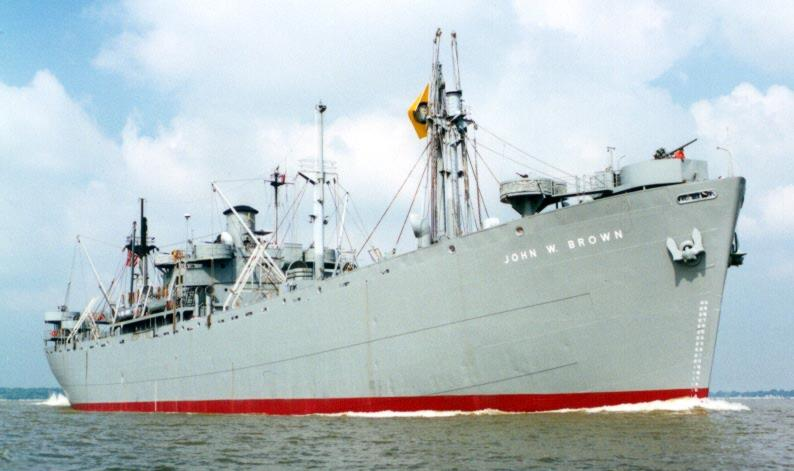
- SS John W. Brown, a ship of the same class

History

United States
- Name: Alexander Macomb
- Namesake: Alexander Macomb
- Owner: War Shipping Administration
- Operator: A. H. Bull Steamship Company
- Ordered: as type (EC2-S-C1) hull, MCE hull 36
- Awarded: 14 March 1941
- Builder: Bethlehem-Fairfield Shipyard, Baltimore, Maryland
- Cost: $1,077,145
- Yard number: 2023
- Way number: 8
- Laid down: 18 February 1942
- Launched: 6 May 1942
- Completed: 2 June 1942
- Fate: Sunk 3 July 1942

General characteristics
- Class & type: Liberty ship; type EC2-S-C1, standard
- Tonnage: 10,865 LT DWT; 7,176 GRT
- Displacement: 3,380 long tons (3,434 t) (light); 14,245 long tons (14,474 t) (max)
- Length: 441 feet 6 inches (135 m) oa; 416 feet (127 m) pp; 427 feet (130 m) lwl
- Beam: 57 feet (17 m)
- Draft: 27 ft 9.25 in (8.4646 m)
- Installed power: 2 × Oil fired 450 °F (232 °C) boilers, operating at 220 psi (1,500 kPa); 2,500 hp (1,900 kW)
- Propulsion: 1 × triple-expansion steam engine, (manufactured by Worthington Pump & Machinery Corp, Harrison, New Jersey); 1 × screw propeller
- Speed: 11.5 knots (21.3 km/h; 13.2 mph)
- Capacity: 562,608 cubic feet (15,931 m^{3}) (grain); 499,573 cubic feet (14,146 m^{3}) (bale)
- Complement: 38–62 USMM; 21–40 USNAG
- Armament: Varied by ship; Bow-mounted 3-inch (76 mm)/50-caliber gun; Stern-mounted 4-inch (102 mm)/50-caliber gun; 2–8 × single 20-millimeter (0.79 in) Oerlikon anti-aircraft (AA) cannons and/or, 2–8 × 37-millimeter (1.46 in) M1 AA guns

SS Alexander Macomb was a Liberty ship built in the United States during World War II. She was named after Alexander Macomb, the commanding general of the U.S. Army from May 29, 1828, until his death on June 25, 1841. Macomb was the field commander at the Battle of Plattsburgh, during the War of 1812, and after the decisive victory, was lauded with praise and styled "the Hero of Plattsburgh" by some of the American press. He was promoted to major general for his conduct, receiving both the Thanks of Congress and a Congressional Gold Medal.

== Construction ==
Alexander Macomb was laid down on 18 February 1942, under a Maritime Commission (MARCOM) contract, MCE hull 36, by the Bethlehem-Fairfield Shipyard, Baltimore, Maryland, and was launched on 6 May 1942.

== History ==
She was allocated to A. H. Bull Steamship Company on 2 June 1942.

=== Sinking ===
The Alexander Macomb sailed from New York City, where she loaded her cargo of 9,000 LT (9,100 t) of tanks, aircraft, and explosives destined for the Soviet Union, to join Convoy BX 27 for Halifax, on her maiden voyage. The convoy was set to depart from the northern end of the Cape Cod Canal on 2 July 1942, but with the grounding of the cargo ship Stephen R. Jones on 28 June 1942, she was forced to sail around Cape Cod.

On the evening of 3 July 1942, sailing in heavy fog and with the fear of colliding with other ships in the convoy, Alexander Macomb fell behind. With hope of catching up with the convoy in daylight, her captain only maintained an intermittent zigzag course. At 12:30 on 4 July, with the rear of the convoy and her escorts in sight, Alexander Macomb was struck between the #4 and #5 holds by a torpedo from German submarine U-215, at 41°48′N 66°35′W, causing her cargo of explosives to ignite and burst into flames. The crew of eight officers, 33 crewmen, and 25 armed guard was able to abandon the ship in three lifeboats and a raft. Because the ship had not been secured and still had forward movement, one of the lifeboats capsized. Alexander Macomb sank at 13:00, 175 mi (282 km) east of Cape Cod. The British trawler HMS Le Tiger picked up 23 crewmen and eight armed guards, while the Canadian corvette HMCS Regina picked up another 14 crewmen and 11 armed guards. Six armed guards and four crewmen died in the attack.

Le Tiger and HMS Veteran pursued U-215 and succeeded in sinking her with depth charges, with a loss of all hands.

== Wreck discovery ==
The wreck of Alexander Macomb was discovered in October 1964, by the Risdon Beazley company salvage ship Droxford at position 41°48′N 66°35′W. The bulk of the metal cargo was removed by the Droxford in 1965. She is considered to be "dangerous to dive".

The wreck of U-215 was discovered by Canadian divers and marine archaeologists in July 2004.
