= James Lorin Richards House =

Historic house in Massachusetts, United States

- U.S. National Register of Historic Places
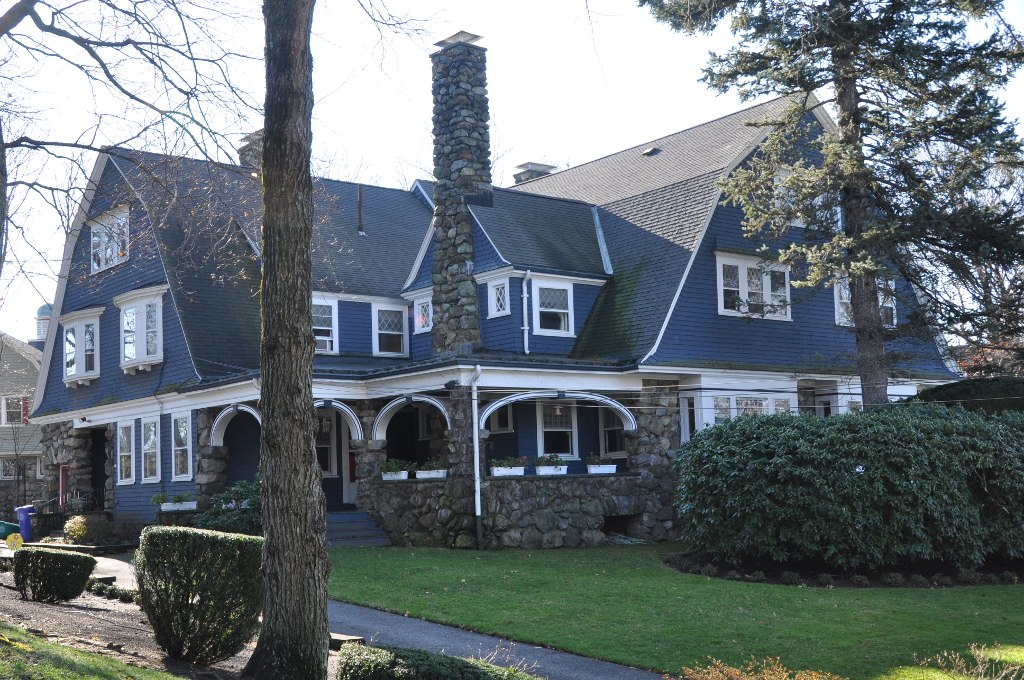
- View from Kirkstall Rd.

- Location within Massachusetts Location within the United States
- Location: 47 Kirkstall and 22 Oakwood Rds., Newton, Massachusetts
- Coordinates: 42°20′37″N 71°12′14″W
- Built: 1901
- Architect: Brown, Samuel J.
- Architectural style: Shingle Style
- MPS: Newton MRA
- NRHP reference No.: 86001871
- Added to NRHP: September 04, 1986

The James Lorin Richards House is an historic house and carriage barn in Newton, Massachusetts. The house is located at 47 Kirkstall Road and the carriage barn, which has been converted to a residence, is at 22 Oakwood Road. The high-style Shingle buildings were designed by Samuel J. Brown and built in 1901 for James Lorin Richards, a successful businessman who made his fortune in tobacco, and was heavily involved in Boston-area electric companies. He also served as president of Norumbega Park, a major early-20th century amusement park in Newton.

The house and barn were listed on the National Register of Historic Places in 1986.

== See also ==
- National Register of Historic Places listings in Newton, Massachusetts
