= Luna (tugboat) =

Tugboat berthed in Massachusetts, US

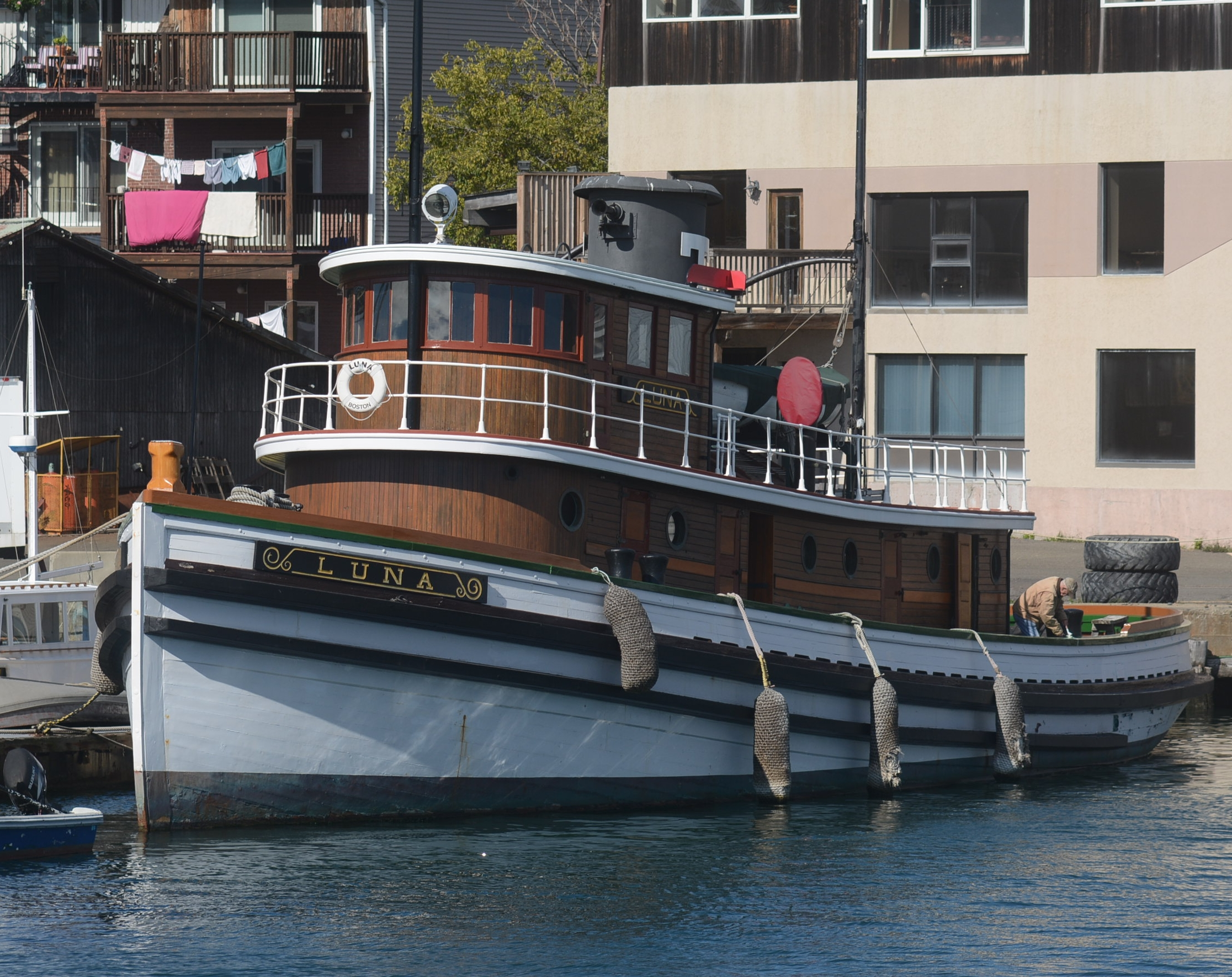
- Luna, Chelsea, Massachusetts, October 2015

History

United States
- Owner: Mystic Steamship Company
- Builder: John G. Alden and M.M. Davis Shipbuilding Company
- Completed: 1930
- Out of service: 1971
- Status: Museum ship

General characteristics
- Displacement: 325 tons (fully loaded; 315 tons (light ship)
- Length: 100.0 ft (30.5 m) (LOA); 90.3 ft (27.5 m) (LBP)
- Beam: 24.8 ft (7.6 m)
- Draft: 13 ft (4.0 m)
- Depth: 18 ft (5.5 m)
- Installed power: 2 × Winton diesel 380 hp (280 kW) each
- Speed: 13 knots (24 km/h; 15 mph)
- Crew: 5
- Luna (tugboat)
- U.S. National Register of Historic Places
- U.S. National Historic Landmark
- Boston Landmark
- Location within Massachusetts
- Location: Chelsea, Massachusetts
- Coordinates: 42°23′11.072″N 71°2′30.246″W
- Built: 1930
- Architect: Alden, John G., & Co.
- NRHP reference No.: 83004099

Significant dates
- Added to NRHP: October 6, 1983
- Designated NHL: April 11, 1989
- Designated BOSL: April 9, 1985

Luna is a historic tugboat normally berthed in Boston Harbor, Massachusetts. Luna was designed in 1930 by John G. Alden and built by M.M. Davis and Bethlehem Steel. She is listed on the National Register of Historic Places and is a U.S. National Historic Landmark. In 1985, the Luna was designated as a Boston Landmark by the Boston Landmarks Commission.

Luna is the last surviving full-sized wooden ship-docking tug on the US Gulf and Atlantic coasts and was the world's first diesel-electric tugboat built for commercial service. These two distinctions have led to designation of Luna as a US National Historic Landmark. Today Luna is preserved at Chelsea, Massachusetts, in Boston Harbor, where her rehabilitation process has been underway since the tug was rescued from being broken up in 1995. Luna is the responsibility of the Luna Preservation Society and its progress is recorded in their website. Due to her wartime service with a civilian crew, Luna is also a member of the Naval Historic Vessel Association.

== Vessel design ==
Luna was designed by John G. Alden (1884–1962), one of America's greatest and most prolific yacht designers, but was heavily influenced by the preferences of the tug's owner, the Mystic Steamship Company, and its subsidiary Boston Tow Boat Company. As a result, Luna's aesthetics embody the classical sweeping profile of the American harbor tug. The tugboat also had a very innovative propulsion plant: two diesel engines, each turning a generator and exciter to create DC current, which was then shunted (via prototypical switchboards) to a single DC motor (weighing 20 tons) attached to a single propeller shaft. The project was a showpiece for Thomas Edison's General Electric Corporation, which seized the challenge to design, build and deliver the components, in conjunction with their control subcontractors. Six years after Luna's delivery, GE reported that there were 33 diesel-electric tugs in service, 21 of which were GE installations.

Luna's wooden hull and deckhouses were built by the M.M. Davis Shipbuilding Company in Solomons, Maryland. The empty hull was towed from the Chesapeake to East Boston for outfitting at the Bethlehem Steel Shipyard in East Boston.

== Operational history ==
=== Boston Harbor ===
Upon completion, Luna was delivered to the Mystic Steamship Company of Boston as the first diesel-powered tug in their fleet. All the other tugs in the Mystic Steamship fleet - commercially known as the Boston Towboat Company - were powered by coal and oil-fired boilers and steam engines. The Mystic Steamship Company could trace its roots to the Boston Towboat Company, which had been founded by Boston's maritime executives to assure salvage, icebreaking, and ship towing services in 1857. The Mystic Steamship Company operated coal-carrying colliers and coal barges to transport coal from railroad piers in New York Harbor, Philadelphia, Baltimore and Newport News. This coal was used as a fuel, and as the basis to make lamp gas from coal and coke. Later, Boston Towboat was operated by Eastern Enterprises, owners of Boston Gas and various maritime operations, which is active to this day as Eastern Enterprises.

Luna and her sister, Venus, were the most powerful, reliable, and efficient boats in the Boston Towboat fleet and therefore were the first boats to be assigned every day. The majority of the tug's work involved docking and undocking ships in every part of greater Boston Harbor, from Salem's coal-fired powerplants and industries in the north, to Plymouth harbor in the south. Most of the time, the tugs were busy pushing and towing tankers, freighters, refrigerated cargo ships, passenger liners, warships, and large barges within Boston Harbor including Chelsea Creek, the Mystic River, the Charles River and Fort Point Channel. They occasionally operated on assignments as far away as Maine and New York.

=== World War II ===
During World War II, Luna was mobilized for service with the US Navy and US Army. She was used as a civilian-crewed and privately owned and managed tugboat at shipyards, repair yards, terminals, piers and anchorages from Bath, Maine to the Cape Cod Canal. Luna handled the many ships launched at the yards, guided damaged ships into drydock, took over the towing of damaged ships in the harbor from seagoing rescue tugs, undocked warships, transports and troopships bound for war, towed barges laden with ammunition, stores and fuel. She greeted returning warships and troop ships at the end of the war. Luna was the flagship of the Boston Towboat fleet until the end of the war, when modern surplus war-built tugs were sold off by the government. General Electric was so proud of Luna that its marine advertisements featured Luna into the early 1950s, a period that spanned almost two decades. During the 1930s, post war 1940s and early 1950s, Luna assisted the USS Constitution with her annual turnaround.

=== Postwar service and retirement ===
As more powerful diesel tugs and diesel-electric tugs were delivered to Boston Towboat, Luna was gradually relegated to back-up status and was retired in 1971. The tug was then used as an office and floating home, until it was acquired by a non-profit research institution in 1979. She was maintained on a shoestring budget by Captain Frances Rose Gage and many volunteers but sank twice in this period. The Luna Preservation Society took responsibility for her in 1995. Luna was declared a National Historic Landmark in 1989. Since being rescued from a graving dock in East Boston in early 1995, Luna has been rehabilitated for her role in Boston Harbor as an operating Landmark and educational vessel.

In October 2000 Luna was towed to Boothbay Harbor, Maine to begin a major overhaul of her hull structure and returned to Boston in May 2002. In October 2007, Luna began a major rehabilitation of all three decks (pilothouse roof, boat deck, and main deck) as well as deckhouse structure and coamings. This work was completed in May 2008 and was followed immediately by cleaning and coating of all original machinery and steel structure in her engine room. Plans are being developed for the installation of a small, modern diesel engine for "shadow" propulsion of the tug, permitting the original machinery to be restored to its original appearance, despite its corrosion damage suffered when the tug sank in fresh and salt water in the late 1980s and early 1990s.

== Current status ==
Luna has been undergoing continuous rehabilitation by volunteers and shipyard personnel since October 2007.

== Specifications ==
- Length Overall 100.0 feet (30.5 m)
- Length Between Perpendiculars 90.3 feet (27.5 m)
- Breadth (width of hull) 24.8 feet (7.6 m)
- Depth (main deck to keel) 18 feet (5.5 m)
- Draft fully loaded 13 feet (4.0 m)
- Height above waterline (fixed) 24.6 feet (7.5 m)
- Gross Tonnage (cubic) 165 tons
- Net Tonnage (cubic) 112 tons
- Displacement fully loaded 325 tons
- Displacement light ship 315 tons
- Engine horsepower 760 horsepower (570 kW)
- Motor horsepower 600 horsepower (450 kW)
- Top speed running free 13 knots (24 km/h; 15 mph)
- Fuel capacity 4,000 US gallons (15,000 L; 3,300 imp gal) (4 tanks)
- Operating range about 30 days at full power
- Harbor day shift crew typical service: 5 persons (Captain, Chief Engineer, Cook, Deckhand, Oiler)
- Minimum crew required in 1930: 3 persons (captain, chief engineer, deckhand)
- Total crew accommodations: 9 berths

=== Main machinery components ===
There are two Winton 6-cylinder, in-line diesel engines produce 380 hp (280 kW) each. At 300 rpm, they create the power that is converted into direct electric current. Two General Electric direct current generators, of 250 kilowatts each, are connected to the main engines and create the electricity that is delivered to the main propulsion motor. Aft of each generator is a General Electric exciters, directly connected to a diesel engine. Exciters induce a current in the rotating armature of the generators.

The engines are two-cycle and have fresh water cooling by a sea water heat exchanger. Salt water/fresh water condensers are installed port and starboard to cool the fresh water that is circulated through the diesel engines to cool the engine blocks. The fresh water loops are surrounded by circulating sea water.

One General Electric deadfront switchboard controls the creation of electricity by the generators and the delivery of electricity to the motor which is a General Electric 600 hp (450 kW) DC electric motor with armatures. It is directly connected to the propeller shaft and turns the iron, four-bladed propeller. The motor is controlled directly from the steering stations.

Two compressors and four compressed air storage tanks are used to crank-start the diesel engines prior to the introduction of diesel fuel. Luna's horn is also air-powered. A set of batteries is installed to store emergency electric power for lighting and starting the compressors.

Luna is equipped with various pumps, including a fuel transfer pump, to shift fuel from one fuel tank to another and to a day tank, a bilge and salvage pump, to pump water from the tug and from barges and ships in case of an emergency, and a fire pump to deliver water to several hydrants for fire-fighting and deck washing. Galley water is delivered by hand pump.

There is also a steering engine which is an electro-hydraulic motor-driven winch that takes directions from the steering wheel and pulls a steering cable connected through pulleys to the tug's rudder from port to starboard.

=== Woods used in construction ===
Several different kinds of wood are used in the construction of the Luna. White Oak is a strong, dense wood used for outboard hull planking, pilothouse planking, keels and keelsons, hull structure and frames, and knees to connect right angles. Cypress is a highly rot-resistant wood used for main deckhouse planking, boat deck (also called the "Texas") and pilothouse decking, and bulwark planking (original). It is being replaced by cedar during restoration. Douglas Fir is a straight-grained and strong wood used for main deck planking, and fore and aft masts. Live Yellow Pine is rot-resistant and flexible; it is used for inboard hull "ceiling" planking, deck beams, deckhouse coamings, and deckhouse studs. Locust is a tough wood that expands. It is used for wooden treenails, also called trunnels, to fasten wooden planks to frames in drilled holes.

== See also ==
- List of U.S. National Historic Landmark ships, shipwrecks, and shipyards
- List of National Historic Landmarks in Massachusetts
- National Register of Historic Places listings in Suffolk County, Massachusetts
