= SS Zaanland =

Dutch cargo ship that served in the US Navy in the First World War

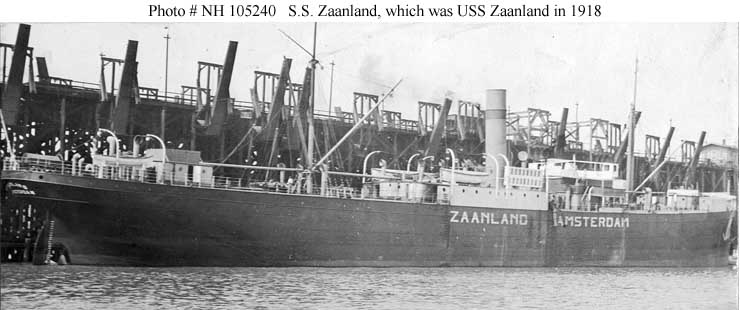
- Zaanland in KHL colors, with her name and port of registration painted on her side for identification as a neutral ship in the First World War

History
- Name: Zaanland
- Namesake: Zaan River
- Owner: 1900: Zuid-Amerika Lijn; 1908: Koninklijke Hollandsche Lloyd
- Operator: (United States) US Navy (1918)
- Port of registry: (Netherlands) Amsterdam
- Route: 1900–17: Europe – east coast of South America
- Builder: Russell & Co, Port Glasgow
- Yard number: 460
- Launched: 7 September 1900
- Completed: 12 October 1900
- Maiden voyage: Greenock – Buenos Aires
- Identification: code letters QCVP; 1918: ID number ID–2746
- Fate: Sunk by collision, 12 May 1918

General characteristics
- Type: cargo ship
- Tonnage: 6,490 DWT; 1902: 4,160 GRT, 2,714 NRT; 1907: 5,417 GRT, 3,526 NRT
- Displacement: 8,700 tons
- Length: 389.4 ft (118.7 m)
- Beam: 51.1 ft (15.6 m)
- Draft: 23 ft 6 in (7.16 m)
- Depth: 25.2 ft (7.7 m)
- Decks: 2
- Installed power: 449 NHP, 2,400 ihp
- Propulsion: 1 × screw; 1 × triple-expansion engine
- Speed: 11 knots (20 km/h)
- Capacity: cargo: 384,000 cu ft (10,900 m^{3}) grain, 355,000 cu ft (10,100 m^{3}) bale; passengers: 1,400 steerage (1906–10)
- Complement: in US Navy: 81
- Notes: sister ships: Amstelland, Rijnland

SS Zaanland was a cargo steamship that was built in Scotland in 1900 for Dutch owners, and sunk in a collision in 1918. She was built for the Zuid-Amerika Lijn, which in 1908 became Koninklijke Hollandsche Lloyd. The US Government requisitioned her in March 1918 as USS Zaanland, with the Naval Registry Identification Number ID–2746. She was sunk in a collision less than two months later.

== Building and identification ==
In 1899 the Zuid-Amerika Line (ZAL) was founded to trade between the Netherlands and South America. It ordered three new sister ships from Russell & Co in Port Glasgow on the River Clyde. Amstelland was built as yard number 459, launched on 5 June 1900, and completed that July. Zaanland was yard number 460, launched on 7 September 1900, and completed on 12 October. Rijnland was yard number 461, launched on 24 October 1900, and completed on 3 December.

Each ship was of the spar-deck type, with a continuous shade deck both fore and aft to carry large amounts of cattle or light cargo. They had all modern machinery fitted for loading and unloading their own cargo, and had electric lights along the decks.

Zaanland had a steel hull with a double bottom built on the cellular principle. Her registered length was 389.4 ft (118.7 m), her beam was 51.1 ft (15.6 m) and her depth was 25.2 ft (7.7 m). As built, her tonnages were 4,160 GRT, 2,714 NRT and 6,490 GRT. Her holds had capacity for 384,000 cubic feet (10,900 m^{3}) of grain, 355,000 cubic feet (10,100 m^{3}) of baled cargo.

Zaanland had a single screw, driven by a three-cylinder triple-expansion steam engine built by Dunsmuir and Jackson of Govan, Glasgow. Its cylinders had a 54-inch (140 cm) stroke, and bores of 27 inches (69 cm), 42 inches (110 cm) and 69 inches (180 cm). Three single-ended Scotch marine boilers with coal-burning furnaces supplied steam to her engine at 180 psi. The engine was rated at 449 NHP or 2,400 ihp, and gave her a speed of 11 knots (20 km/h).

ZAL registered Zaanland at Amsterdam. Her code letters were QCVP. Zaanland's sea trials on 12 October 1900 were satisfactory, whereupon she was delivered to her owners.

== Peacetime merchant career ==
Zaanland's maiden voyage was from Greenock, carrying a cargo of coal to Argentina. She reached Buenos Aires on 10 November, left on her return voyage on 15 December, and reached Dunkirk in France on 13 January 1901. On a subsequent voyage in July 1902, she struck a wharf when entering port at Dunkirk, damaging her bow and several plates of her hull.

ZAL's regular trade was to ship coal from various European countries to Rio de Janeiro, Montevideo and Buenos Aires, and bring agricultural produce and live cattle from those ports to Europe. However, outbreaks of foot-and-mouth disease in Argentina led the United Kingdom to ban imports of live cattle from 1900 until September 1903. As a result, ZAL lost 700,000 guilders in its first five years of trading. After negotiations between ZAL and the Dutch government, the Dutch Senate voted to subsidise the company by three million guilders, spread over 15 years. As part of the same agreement, all ZAL assets were transferred to a new company, NV Koninklijke Hollandsche Lloyd (KHL, or "Royal Holland Lloyd").

In response to increasing emigration from Europe to South America, ZAL had its cargo ships modified to carry passengers. In 1906 Zaanland was refitted with 1,400 steerage berths, which increased her tonnages to 5,417 GRT and 3,526 NRT. Zaanland's first voyage carrying emigrants left Amsterdam on 23 September 1906, and reached Buenos Aires a month later. At the start of her return voyage, she struck a submerged wreck while leaving harbor. She suffered only minor damage to her bottom, which required only minor repairs.

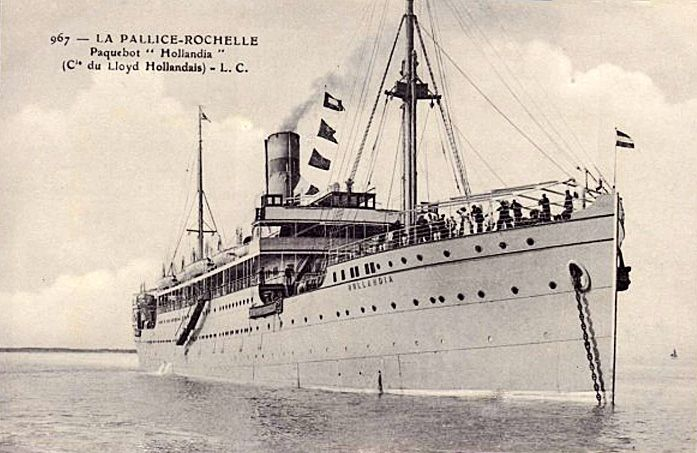
KHL's Hollandia, built in 1909. She and her sister ship Frisia displaced Zaanland and her sisters from the emigrant trade.

In 1909, KHL took delivery of two purpose-built passenger-cargo ships: Hollandia and Frisia. Each had berths for 1,280 steerage passengers, and small numbers of forst class and second class passengers. Zaanland ceased to carry passengers.

== First World War merchant career ==
During the First World War, the Entente powers blockaded the Central Powers. The Netherlands were neutral, but the Entente powers stopped and searched Dutch merchant ships, and confiscated goods that were banned by the blockade. In March 1916, 150 casks of sausage casings in her cargo were seized in London as contraband. On 28 September 1916 it was reported that the UK authorities seized mails from several neutral vessels, including Zaanland.

On 1 August 1916, just before 01:00hrs GMT, Zaanland was proceeding to her anchorage at the Downs when she struck the steamship Jessie, which was already at anchor. The collision damaged Jessie's bow and set her adrift. She in turn collided with another anchored steamship, Carbo I., and damaged her bow. Zaanland sustained little damage, and was towed to IJmuiden.

On 14 June U-66 sank the Norwegian barque Perfect. Zaanland rescued Perfect's 16-man crew, and landed them at IJmuiden four days later.

After the United States declared war against the Central Powers in April 1917, there was an increasing shortage of coal for bunkering. Neutral ships relied on coal from North America, which was not easily available to them. In September 1917 Zaanland began what became her final voyage to South America. From there she went to North America for bunkering, and remained there for several months.

== US Navy career and loss ==
On 20 March 1918 the US Government seized Zaanland under angary at Hampton Roads. On 25 March she was commissioned into the US Navy with the Naval Registry Identification Number ID–2746, and Lieutenant Commander Daniel Browh, USNRF, as her commander.

Zaanland was assigned to the Naval Overseas Transportation Service, and fitted out by the Newport News Shipbuilding and Drydock Company. On 4 April 1918 she left for the Gulf of Mexico, and on 11 April she reached New Orleans. There her conversion work continued, while she loaded 4,946 tons of general cargo for the US Army Quartermaster Corps. On 20 April she left New Orleans, and five days later she reached Hampton Roads.

On 30 April, Zaanland left Norfolk, Virginia with Convoy HN–67. At 2026 hrs on 12 May she suffered a rudder problem in fog. The tanker USS Hisko rammed her, making a 15-foot (5 m) hole in Zaanland's starboard side, amidships between her bridge and fire room. She listed heavily and began to sink by the bow. At 20:40 hrs, all hands were called to boat stations, and her lifeboats were launched.

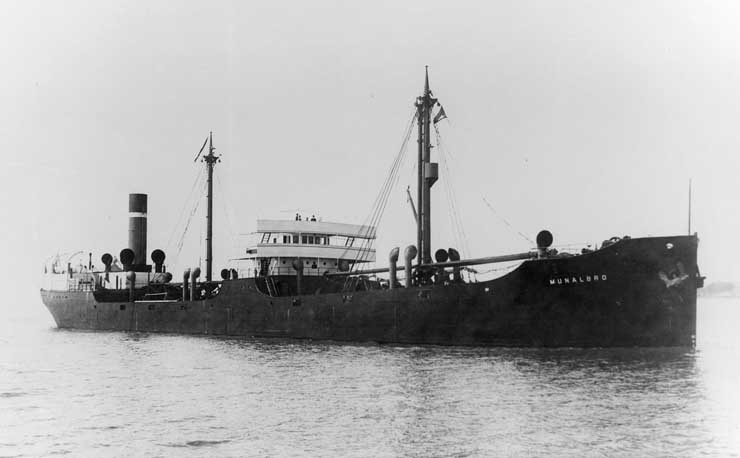
Munson's collier Munalbro rescued Zaanland's crew

Within an hour, all of her crew were safely aboard the Munson Steamship Line collier Munalbro, which was on charter to the US Army. Munalbro stood by to see if Zaanland would stay afloat and could be towed to port. At 0400 hrs Lt Cmdr Brown re-boarded Zaanland, inspected her, and concluded that she would sink within a few hours. At 0710 hrs on 13 May she sank bow-first at approximate position 45°29′N 31°44′W.

Munalbro tried to catch up with Convoy HN-67. Before doing so, she met the westbound steamship Minnesota. She transferred Zaanland's crew to Minnesota, who returned them to the US.
