= Mystic Steamship Company =

US Shipping Company

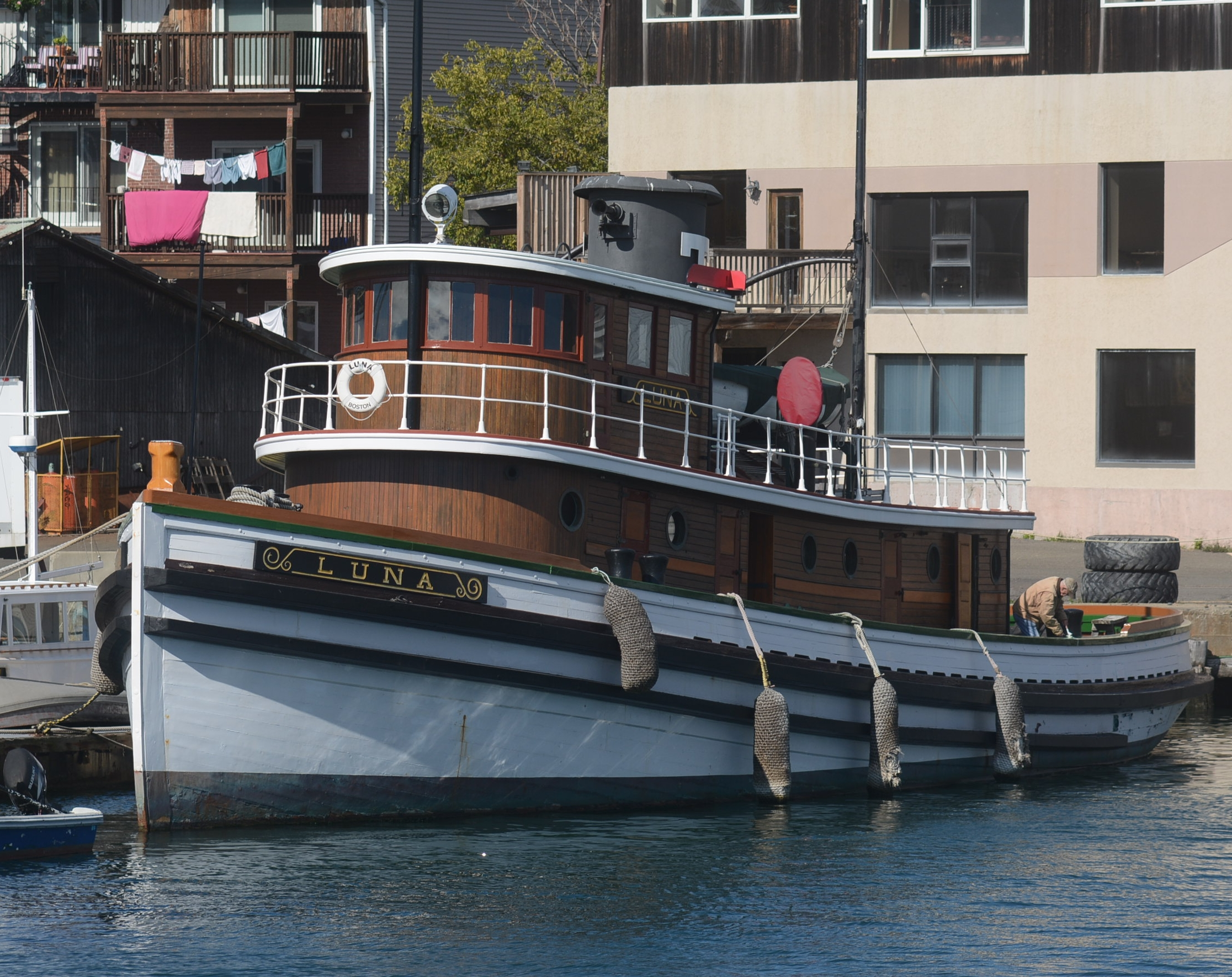
- Mystic Steamship Company's Tug Luna, at Chelsea, Massachusetts, October 2015
- Formerly: Boston Tow Boat Company and T-Wharf Towing Company
- Type: Private company
- Industry: Shipping
- Founded: 1854 in Boston, Massachusetts, United States
- Defunct: 1985
- Area served: Eastern United States
- Key people: Frederick B Craven, James Lorin Richards, Robert Winsor
- Services: Tug towing, coal, oil, and gas transportation
- Parent: Boston Gas Eastern Enterprises Incorporated; Boston Fuel Transportation Company

Mystic Steamship Company, also known as Boston Tow Boat Company, was a Boston, Massachusetts shipping company named after the Mystic River. The company operated from 1854 until its closure in 1985.

== History ==
The company was founded in 1854 as the T-Wharf Towing Company. Boston Tow Boat Company was an operator of ship salvaging, icebreaker shipping, and a tugboat operator.

The other major operation was transporting coal. Mystic Steamship Company operated collier ships and coal barges. Coal was load at Newport News, Virginia and delivery to New York Harbor, Philadelphia and Baltimore. Mystic Steamship Company was also a bulk grain transporter.

Eastern Gas & Fuel Associates, which later became Eastern Enterprises, purchased and ran Mystic Steamship Company.

T-Wharf Towing Company merged into the Boston Gas Eastern Enterprises Incorporated, its parent company, on June 30, 1917. Boston Gas Eastern Enterprises reformed the shipping lines as the Boston Towboat Company Incorporated. Boston Fuel Transportation Company purchased Boston Towboat Company in 1985. Boston Fuel renamed the company the Boston Towing and Transportation Companies. In 1940, the company became the Mystic Steamship, a Division of Eastern Gas and Fuel Associates.

During World War I, Mystic Steamship Company operated Merchant navy ships for the United States Shipping Board. During World War II, Mystic Steamship Company was active with charter shipping with the Maritime Commission and War Shipping Administration.

After the war, Mystic Steamship purchased some World War surplus Liberty ships, both tankers and collier types.

== Ships ==
- Luna, tugboat, a City of Boston Landmark
- Venus, tugboat
- Trojan, tug
- Biwabik, ship
- Brandon, ship
- Admiral Clark, ship
- Brockton, 1908 Steamboat
- Arlington, 1910 Steamboat

=== Liberty ships ===
- SS Winchester, ship
- Sewanee Seam
- Sewell Seam
- Beckley Seam
- Pittsburgh Seam
- Jewell Seam
- Jellico Seam
- Mingo Seam
- Roda Seam

=== World War II ===
- USS Stephen R. Jones
- SS William A. McKenney
- SS Melrose, collier, Coal cargo 7200 tons, bunkers 800 tons, crew of 3

==== Liberty ships ====
- Jagger Seam
- Hadley F. Brown
- William Pierce Frye
- Sumner I. Kimball

== See also ==
- World War II United States Merchant Navy
