= USS Hisko =

Tanker that served in the United States Navy from 1917 to 1919

History

United States
- Name: USS Hisko
- Namesake: Previous name retained
- Builder: Chester Ship Building Company, Chester, Pennsylvania
- Launched: 15 October 1917
- Completed: 1917
- Acquired: 1917
- Commissioned: 6 December 1917
- Decommissioned: 1 October 1919
- Fate: Returned to United States Shipping Board 1919; scrapped 1948
- Notes: Operated commercially by United States Shipping Board as SS Hisko beginning in 1919; renamed SS Beta 1925

General characteristics
- Type: Tanker
- Tonnage: 5,665 gross register tons
- Displacement: 14,995 tons
- Length: 401 ft 0 in (122.22 m)
- Beam: 54 ft 3 in (16.54 m)
- Draft: 26 ft 0 in (7.92 m) mean
- Speed: 10 knots
- Complement: 53
- Armament: An unrecorded number and type of guns

USS Hisko (ID-1953) was a tanker that served in the United States Navy from 1917 to 1919.

== Service history ==
SS Hisko was built for the United States Shipping Board by the Chester Ship Building Company, Chester, Pennsylvania, and launched 15 October 1917. Acquired by the U.S. Navy for World War I service, she was designated with Id. No. 1953 and commissioned as USS Hisko on 6 December 1917 at Philadelphia, Pennsylvania.

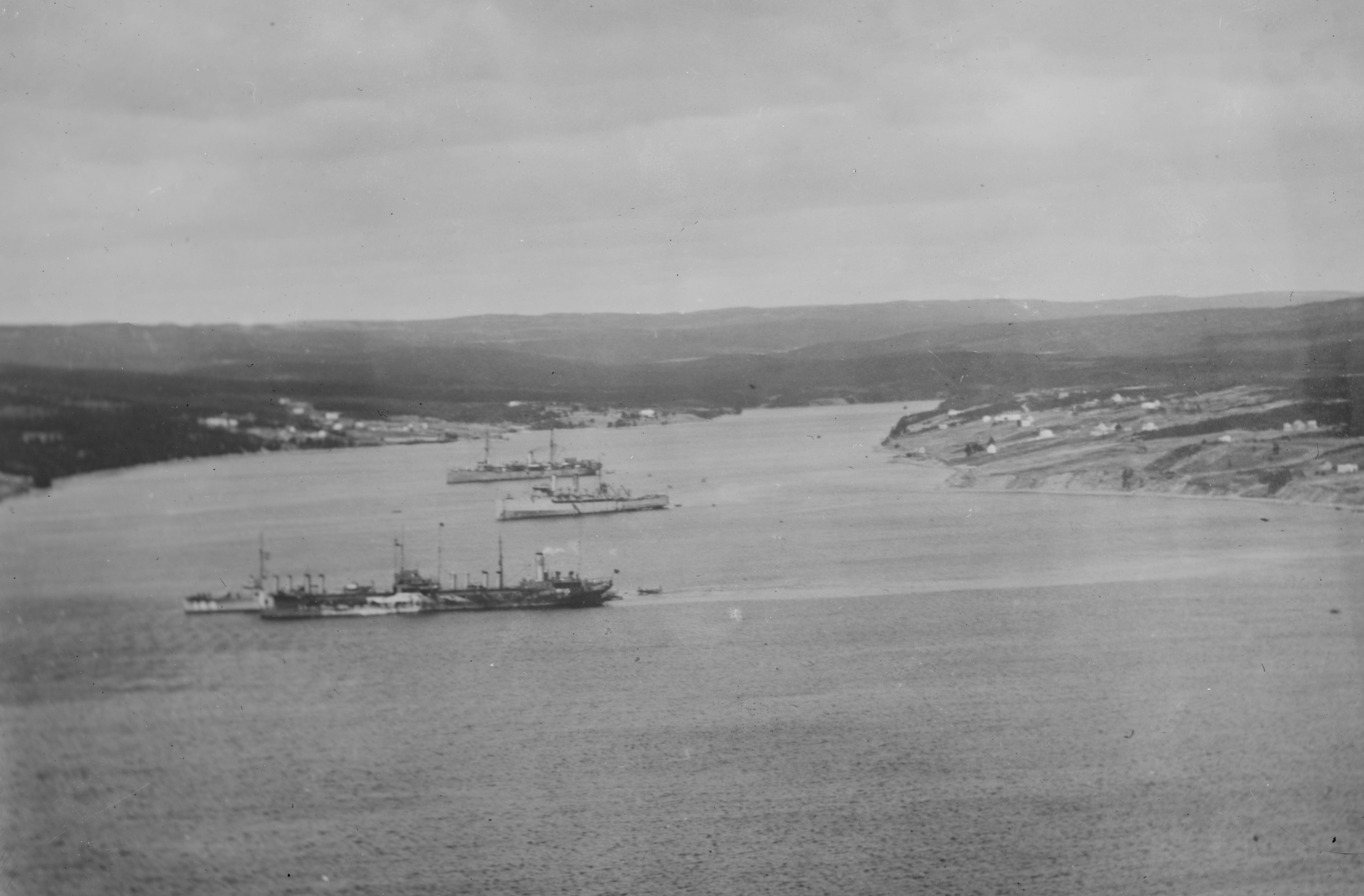
USS Hisko at Trepassey Bay in May 1919

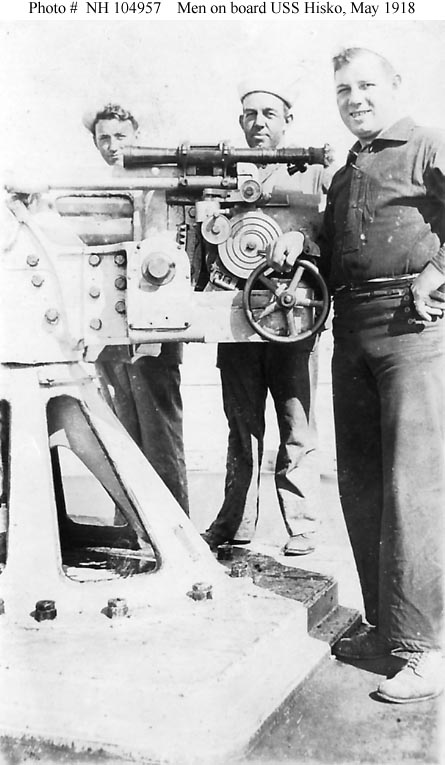
Sailors pose with a gun aboard USS Hisko sometime between 3 and 18 May 1918 during a voyage from New York City to Plymouth, England.

After two short runs from New York City to Hampton Roads, Virginia, Hisko sailed from Norfolk, Virginia, for England in late December 1917 with a transatlantic convoy. She discharged her cargo of fuel oil into U.S. Navy tanks at Devonport, England, and returned to the United States. She left Norfolk on her second eastbound voyage on 26 January 1918, arriving in Plymouth, England, through severe winter storms on 12 February 1918. She returned to New York on 8 March 1918.

In the following year and a half, the tanker made eleven similar voyages carrying fuel oil to American ships in such scattered points as Devonport, England; Brest, France; the Panama Canal Zone; Ponta Delgada in the Azores; Glasgow, Scotland; and Newfoundland. Hisko took on oil at New York for most of this period, although she did make three trips to the Gulf of Mexico to load fuel at Port Arthur, Texas, and Baton Rouge, Louisiana. Several ships in her convoys, including a French cruiser, were torpedoed by German U-boats, but Hisko escaped unscathed with her valuable cargo.

== Incidents ==
On 3 May 1918, Hisko departed New York City on a voyage to Plymouth, England. During the night of 12 May 1918, while her convoy was engulfed in dense fog, Hisko radioed that she had been in collision with an unknown vessel. This was probably the cargo ship USS Zaanland, which appears to have collided with Hisko after suffering a steering casualty. Zaanland sank before salvage attempts could begin. Hisko arrived at Plymouth safely on 18 May 1918.

During a return voyage to New York, Hisko was again involved in a collision. On the night of 5–6 September 1918 in high seas and fog, Hisko was in collision with the 3,121-Gross register ton United Fruit Company passenger-cargo ship SS Almirante south of the Brigantine Shoals at approximately 39°21′N 74°13′W, some 16 nautical miles (30 kilometres) off the coast of New Jersey near Atlantic City. Despite substantial damage to her bow, Hisko was able to continue to New York, but Almirante sank quickly in some 70 feet (21 meters) of water. Due to the immediate actions of Hisko′s crew and the response of the United States Lifesaving Service from Atlantic City, only five or seven people died (reports differ) among the 105 passengers and crew.

== Later service and fate ==
In May 1919, Hisko was detached from the Naval Overseas Transportation Service to support the Transatlantic Flying Expedition, in which the U.S. Navy flying boat NC-4 made the first crossing of the Atlantic Ocean by an American aircraft. Hisko was one of the tankers that supplied fuel to the three flying boats and to the destroyers involved in this historic operation.

Hisko returned to New York from her final overseas trip in U.S. Navy service on 28 September 1919. She decommissioned there on 1 October 1919 and was returned to the United States Shipping Board. As SS Hisko, she entered commercial service and was renamed SS Beta in 1925. She was scrapped at Baltimore, Maryland, in 1948.
