= Frederick Winsor (surgeon) =

American surgeon (1829–1889)

Frederick Winsor (October 2, 1829 – February 25, 1889) was a Civil War surgeon, head of the Massachusetts State Hospital and longtime medical doctor in Salem, Massachusetts.

Born in Boston, Massachusetts on October 2, 1829, Winsor was the youngest of 12 children of Thomas Winsor (who died when Frederick was two) and Welthea Sprague, one of 15 children of Seth Sprague of Duxbury, Massachusetts, a famous Methodist anti-slavery leader.

Winsor attended Boston Latin School, and graduated Harvard University in 1851. He was known as a great athlete at Harvard, despite serious eye problems that forced him to leave school in his senior year and have his lessons read to him in order to graduate. He then attended Harvard Medical School, graduating in 1855. That same year he began his long practice as a physician in Salem, Massachusetts. Winsor married Ann Bent Ware, daughter of Unitarian minister, professor, and abolitionist Henry Ware Jr. and Mary Lovell Pickard, on August 10, 1857 in Milton, Massachusetts.

In 1861, Massachusetts Governor John Albion Andrew appointed Winsor head of the State Hospital at Rainsford Island. A year later he left his post to enlist as a surgeon in the 49th Massachusetts regiment, serving from 1862 to 1863 through the disastrous Louisiana Campaign under the command of Colonel (later General) William Francis Bartlett. During a disastrous frontal assault on Port Hudson, Louisiana on May 27, 1863, Bartlett was shot twice—once in his remaining unamputated leg and once in his wrist, shattering it. Dr. Winsor worked through the night to remove the bullet from Col. Bartlett's wrist, saving his hand. He would write a gripping account of that night years later for Atlantic Monthly:

His clear blue eye met mine steadily, his strong right hand grasped mine firmly, and the voice that could ring along the line like a trumpet had no waver in it as it said, “How are you, doctor? We’ve had a tough time of it. Now you must do your best for me. I can’t lose another limb, you know.” I saw that the hurt in the head could be nothing serious; a buckshot had scored the scalp to the bone, and another had done the same for the heel of his one foot. I undid the bandage that bound his left wrist, and examined it. A ball had entered on one side, and lay near the surface on the other. His eyes questioned me, and I replied, “I can soon take that ball out, when you are under ether. That’s a very tender place.” “But you won’t take off the hand?” “I will do nothing without letting you know and having your consent, Colonel.” So he drank of oblivion and ceased to suffer, but his dream was not of home. “Doctor,” he muttered (talking in the ether sleep), “that’s my bridle hand, you know. Never can ride at the head of my regiment again if you take that off.” In a moment I held the bullet in my hand, and saw with joy that it was round and rather small, giving reason to hope that it had not shattered the bones badly in coming through, which could hardly have been the case had it been conical. No loose bone was to be felt, and I had the great pleasure of telling him, as he returned to consciousness, that there was good reason to hope that his “bridle hand” would by and by hold the rein again. A smile of satisfaction and relief lit up the face which had till then been set in the resolve to bear the worst, and with the simple, hearty thanks which we surgeons had from the hundreds of men that night he was borne off to his blanket side by side with his officers.

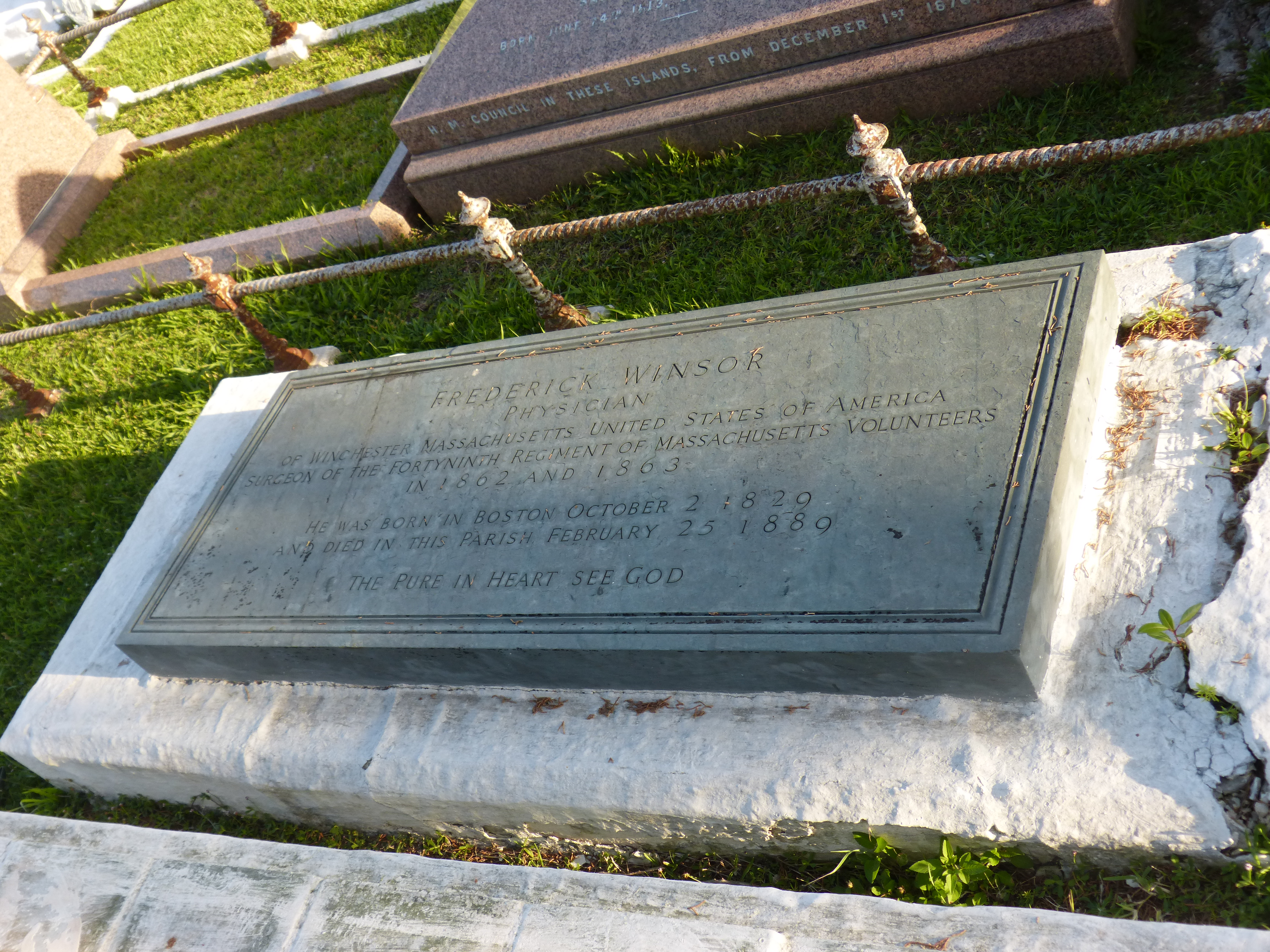
Frederick Winsor's grave at St. John's Church in Pembroke, Bermuda.

Although Winsor returned to private practice in Winchester, Massachusetts after his service, he continued to contribute to the State Board of Health, writing important state health reports such as "The Hygiene of School Houses" (1874), and "Water Supply, Drainage, and Sewerage from the Sanitary Point of View" (1876). He also founded the Unitarian Church of Winchester in 1865. Winsor died in Hamilton, Bermuda on February 25, 1889.

Frederick and Ann Winsor's children were: Robert Winsor, born 1858, leading partner of Kidder, Peabody & Co. from 1919 until his death in 1930; Mary P. Winsor, born 1860, founder and longtime director of the Winsor School for Girls; Paul Winsor, born 1863, engineer, inventor, and vice president of the Boston Elevated Railway, Annie W. (Winsor) Allen, born 1865, founder and director of Roger Ascham School in Scarsdale, New York, Jane L. (Winsor) Gale, born 1868, founder and manager of Boston's Toy Theater; Elizabeth W. (Winsor) Pearson, co-founder of the Nursery Training School (now the Eliot-Pearson School at Tufts University); and Frederick Winsor Jr., founder and longtime director of Middlesex School.
