= German submarine U-215 =

German World War II submarine

Coordinates: 41°28′47.9″N 66°22′47.9″W

History

Nazi Germany
- Name: U-215
- Ordered: 16 February 1940
- Builder: Germaniawerft, Kiel
- Yard number: 647
- Laid down: 15 November 1940
- Launched: 9 October 1941
- Commissioned: 22 November 1941
- Fate: Sunk, 3 July 1942

General characteristics
- Class & type: Type VIID submarine
- Displacement: 965 tonnes (950 long tons) surfaced; 1,080 t (1,060 long tons) submerged
- Length: 76.90 m (252 ft 4 in) o/a; 59.80 m (196 ft 2 in) pressure hull
- Beam: 6.38 m (20 ft 11 in) o/a; 4.70 m (15 ft 5 in) pressure hull
- Height: 9.70 m (31 ft 10 in)
- Draught: 5 m (16 ft 5 in)
- Installed power: 2,800–3,200 PS (2,100–2,400 kW; 2,800–3,200 bhp) (diesels); 750 PS (550 kW; 740 shp) (electric)
- Propulsion: 2 shafts; 2 × diesel engines; 2 × electric motors
- Speed: 16.7 knots (30.9 km/h; 19.2 mph) surfaced; 7.9 knots (14.6 km/h; 9.1 mph) submerged
- Range: 11,200 nmi (20,700 km; 12,900 mi) at 10 knots (19 km/h; 12 mph) surfaced; 69 km (37 nmi) at 4 knots (7.4 km/h; 4.6 mph) submerged
- Test depth: 200 m (660 ft); Crush depth: 220–240 m (720–790 ft)
- Crew: 4 officers, 40 enlisted
- Armament: 5 × 53.3 cm (21 in) torpedo tubes (four bow, one stern); 12 × torpedoes or 26 × TMA or 39 × TMB tube-launched mines; 5 × vertical launchers with 15 SMA mines; 1 × 8.8 cm (3.46 in) deck gun (220 rounds); 1 × 2 cm (0.79 in) anti-aircraft gun (4,380 rounds)

Service record
- Part of: 5th U-boat Flotilla; 22 November 1941 – 30 June 1942; 9th U-boat Flotilla; 1 – 3 July 1942
- Identification codes: M 41 815
- Commanders: K.Kapt. Fritz Hoeckner; 22 November 1941 – 3 July 1942
- Operations: 1 patrol: 9 June – 3 July 1942
- Victories: 1 merchant ship sunk (7,191 GRT)

German submarine U-215 was a Type VIID mine-laying U-boat (Unterseeboot) of Nazi Germany's Navy (Kriegsmarine) during World War II. She was one of six U-boats of her kind, equipped with special vertical tubes that launched the mines. Her keel was laid down 15 November 1940 by Germaniawerft in Kiel as yard number 647. The U-boat was launched on 9 October 1941 and commissioned on 22 November with Kapitänleutnant Fritz Hoeckner in command.

== Design ==
As one of the six German Type VIID submarines, U-215 had a displacement of 965 tonnes (950 long tons) when at the surface and 1,080 tonnes (1,060 long tons) while submerged. She had a total length of 76.90 m (252 ft 4 in), a pressure hull length of 59.80 m (196 ft 2 in), a beam of 6.38 m (20 ft 11 in), a height of 9.70 m (31 ft 10 in), and a draught of 5.01 m (16 ft 5 in). The submarine was powered by two Germaniawerft F46 supercharged, four-stroke, six-cylinder, diesel engines producing a total of 2,800 to 3,200 metric horsepower (2,060 to 2,350 kW; 2,760 to 3,160 shp) for use while surfaced and two AEG GU 460/8-276 double-acting electric motors producing a total of 750 shaft horsepower (760 PS; 560 kW) for use while submerged. She had two shafts and two 1.23 m (4 ft) propellers. The boat was capable of operating at depths down to 230 m (750 ft).

The submarine had a maximum surface speed of 16–16.7 knots (29.6–30.9 km/h; 18.4–19.2 mph) and a maximum submerged speed of 7.3 kn (13.5 km/h; 8.4 mph). When submerged, the boat could operate for 69 nautical miles (128 km; 79 mi) at 4 kn (7.4 km/h; 4.6 mph); when surfaced, she could travel 11,200 nmi (20,700 km; 12,900 mi) at 10 kn (19 km/h; 12 mph). U-215 was fitted with five 53.3 cm (21 in) torpedo tubes (four fitted at the bow and one at the stern), 12 torpedoes, one 8.8 cm (3.46 in) SK C/35 naval gun, 220 rounds, and an antiaircraft gun, in addition to five mine tubes with 15 SMA mines. The boat had a crew complement of 49.

== Service history ==
U-215 was sunk in the summer of 1942 by British warship HMS Le Tiger, while on a mission to lay mines in Boston Harbor after attacking and sinking the U.S. Liberty ship SS Alexander Macomb, part of an allied convoy. The wreck was not discovered until 2004.

== Wreck site ==
She now lies 270 ft (82 m) beneath the surface of the Atlantic, 150 nmi (280 km; 170 mi) off the coast of New England and south of Nova Scotia, in Canadian territorial waters. Four of her five vertical tubes are still sealed, and her hatches are still sealed with the remains of 49 German sailors entombed within.

== Summary of raiding history ==
| Date | Ship name | Nationality | Tonnage (GRT) | Fate |
|---|---|---|---|---|
| 3 July 1942 | SS Alexander Macomb | United States | 7,191 | Sunk |
