= HMCS Regina (K234) =

Flower-class corvette

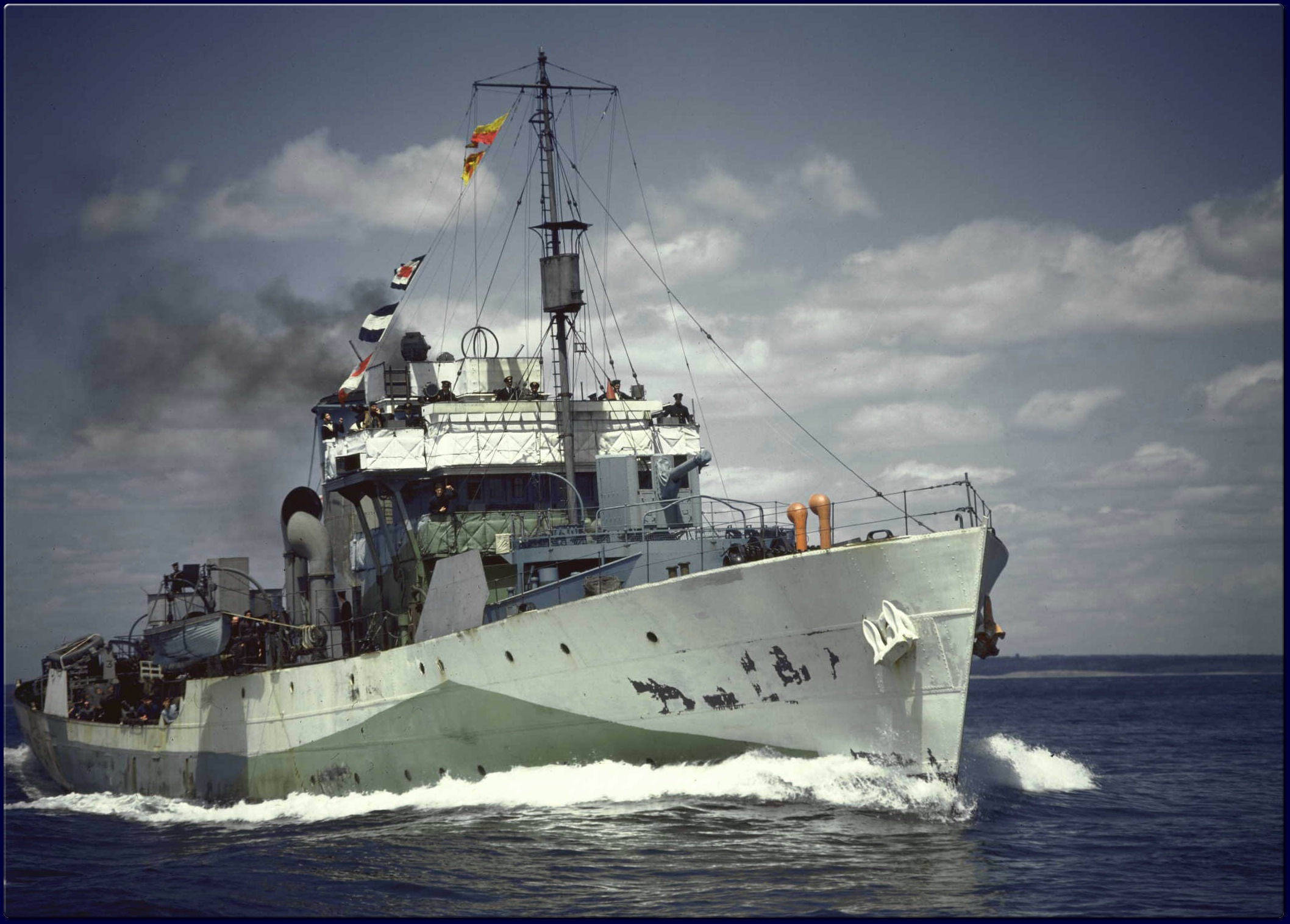
- HMCS Regina, c. 1942–1943

History

Canada
- Name: Regina
- Namesake: Regina, Saskatchewan
- Builder: Marine Industries. Ltd., Sorel
- Laid down: 22 March 1941
- Launched: 14 October 1941
- Commissioned: 22 January 1942
- Out of service: 8 August 1944
- Honours and awards: Atlantic 1942–44, Gulf of St. Lawrence 1942, Mediterranean 1943, Normandy 1944, English Channel 1944
- Fate: Torpedoed and sunk on 8 August 1944

General characteristics
- Class & type: Flower-class corvette
- Displacement: 925 long tons (940 t; 1,036 short tons)
- Length: 205 ft (62.48 m)o/a
- Beam: 33 ft (10.06 m)
- Draught: 11.5 ft (3.51 m)
- Propulsion: single shaft; 2 × water tube boilers; 1 × double acting triple-expansion reciprocating steam engine; 2,750 ihp (2,050 kW)
- Speed: 16 knots (29.6 km/h)(18.4mph)
- Range: 3,500 nautical miles (6,482 km) at 12 knots (22.2 km/h)(13.8mph)
- Complement: 85
- Sensors & processing systems: 1 × SW1C or 2C radar; 1 × Type 123A or Type 127DV sonar
- Armament: 1 × BL 4 in (102 mm) Mk.IX gun; 2 × Vickers .50 cal machine gun (twin); 2 × Lewis .303 cal machine gun (twin); 2 × Mk.II depth charge throwers; 2 × Depth charge rails with 40 depth charges

HMCS Regina was a Royal Canadian Navy revised Flower-class corvette which took part in convoy escort duties during the Second World War. She fought primarily in the Battle of the Atlantic. She was named for Regina, Saskatchewan.

== Background ==
Flower-class corvettes like Regina serving with the Royal Canadian Navy during the Second World War were different from earlier and more traditional sail-driven corvettes. The "corvette" designation was created by the French as a class of small warships; the Royal Navy borrowed the term for a period but discontinued its use in 1877. During the hurried preparations for war in the late 1930s, Winston Churchill reactivated the corvette class, needing a name for smaller ships used in an escort capacity, in this case based on a whaling ship design. The generic name "flower" was used to designate the class of these ships, which – in the Royal Navy – were named after flowering plants.

Corvettes commissioned by the Royal Canadian Navy during the Second World War were named after communities for the most part, to better represent the people who took part in building them. This idea was put forth by Admiral Percy W. Nelles. Sponsors were commonly associated with the community for which the ship was named. Royal Navy corvettes were designed as open sea escorts, while Canadian corvettes were developed for coastal auxiliary roles which was exemplified by their minesweeping gear. Eventually the Canadian corvettes would be modified to allow them to perform better on the open seas.

== Construction ==
Regina was ordered as part of the Revised 1940-41 Flower class building program. This revised program radically changed the look of the Flower-class corvette. The ships of this program kept the water-tube boilers of the initial 1940-41 program, but now they were housed in separate compartments for safety. The fo'c'sle was extended, which allowed more space for berths for the crew, leading to an expansion of the crew. The bow had increased flare for better control in heavy seas. The revised Flowers of the RCN received an additional two depth charge throwers fitted amidships and more depth charges. They also came with heavier secondary armament with 20 mm anti-aircraft guns carried on the extended bridge wings. All this led to an increase in displacement, draught and length.

Regina was laid down by Marine Industries Ltd. at Sorel on 22 March 1941 and launched on 14 October of that year. She was commissioned into the RCN on 22 January 1942 at Halifax, Nova Scotia. Regina had only one significant refit during her career, beginning at Sydney, Nova Scotia in June 1943 and completed at Pictou, Nova Scotia in mid-December 1943. After completion, she needed further repairs at Halifax and Shelburne.

== War service ==
After commissioning and workups, Regina was assigned to the Western Local Escort Force (WLEF) in mid-March. She remained with them until September 1942. On 3 July 1942 Regina rescued 25 survivors of the American merchant SS Alexander Macomb which was sunk east of Cape Cod. In September she was assigned to Operation Torch, the Allied invasion of North Africa.

Regina arrived in the United Kingdom in November and by January 1943 was actively escorting convoys to and from Gibraltar. On 8 February 1943, Regina attacked and sank the Italian submarine Avorio off Philippeville, Algeria. She returned to Canada in late March 1943 and briefly rejoined WLEF before departing for a refit in June.

After returning to service in February 1944 following her refit, Regina was assigned to the Mid-Ocean Escort Force escort group C-1 as a trans-Atlantic convoy escort. While escorting convoy SC 154, she was detached from escort duty to escort a Royal Navy tug that was towing the convoy rescue ship Dundas to Horta in the Azores. She left Horta 14 March 1944 to escort HMCS Mulgrave, which was under tow for the Clyde. At the end of March, Regina was assigned to Western Approaches Command for invasion duties associated with Operation Neptune, the naval component of the invasion of Normandy. After the invasion she was used as a coastal convoy escort in the English Channel.

=== Sinking ===
On 8 August 1944, Regina was torpedoed and sunk by U-667 8 nautical miles (15 km) north of Trevose Head on the coast of Cornwall at 50°42′N 5°3′W while rescuing survivors of the American merchant Liberty ship Ezra Weston. The warship sank in 28 seconds. Thirty of the ship's crew were killed. The wrecks of Regina and Ezra Weston rest in 60 metres (200 ft) of water. The exploration of these wrecks by a crew of researchers was the subject of an episode of the television documentary series "Deep Sea Mysteries".
