= USS Stephen R. Jones =

Cargo ship of the United States Navy

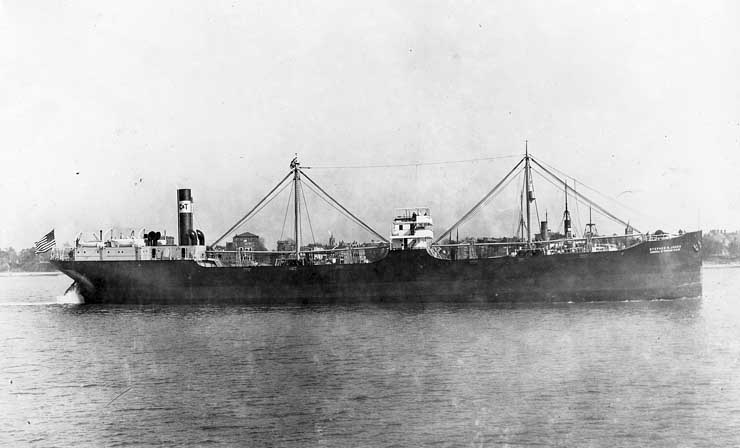
- SS Stephen R. Jones as a commercial collier prior to her U.S. Navy service as a cargo ship.

History

United States
- Name: USS Stephen R. Jones
- Namesake: Previous name retained
- Builder: Newport News Shipbuilding and Drydock Company, Newport News, Virginia
- Launched: 23 October 1915
- Completed: 11 November 1915
- Acquired: 3 May 1918
- Commissioned: 3 May 1918
- Decommissioned: 8 March 1919
- Fate: Transferred to United States Shipping Board 8 May 1919 for simultaneous return to owners
- Notes: In commercial service as SS Stephen R. Jones 1915-1918 and 1919-1942; Wrecked 28 June 1942

General characteristics
- Type: Cargo ship
- Tonnage: 4,387 Gross register tons
- Displacement: 10,200 tons (normal)
- Length: 354 ft 2 in (107.95 m)
- Beam: 49 ft (15 m)
- Draft: 23 ft (7.0 m)
- Propulsion: Steam engine
- Speed: 10 knots
- Complement: 71
- Armament: 2 × 3-inch (76.2-millimeter) guns

USS Stephen R. Jones (ID-4526) was a cargo ship that served in the United States Navy from 1918 to 1919.

SS Stephen R. Jones was built in 1915 as a commercial collier at Newport News, Virginia, by Newport News Shipbuilding and Drydock Company, and was delivered to her owners, the Crowell and Thurlow Steamship Company of Boston, Massachusetts, on 11 November 1915. The U.S. Navy acquired her on 3 May 1918 at Philadelphia, Pennsylvania, for World War I service as a cargo ship and commissioned her the same day as USS Stephen R. Jones.

Assigned to the Naval Overseas Transportation Service, Stephen R. Jones was immediately refitted for naval service, loaded with a cargo of United States Army supplies, and ordered to Norfolk, Virginia. She joined a convoy at Hampton Roads, Virginia, and departed for France on 18 May 1918. She arrived at Brest, France, on 5 June 1918 but, due to the congestion of shipping there, was routed to Bordeaux, France, to off-load her cargo. She then returned to the United States, arriving at Philadelphia on 10 July 1918.

Loading another cargo of U.S. Army supplies, Stephen R. Jones again set out for France, arriving at St. Nazaire on 18 August 1918. After unloading, she moved to Le Verdon-sur-Mer, France, for ballast. She departed Le Verdon-sur-Mer with a convoy bound for Philadelphia on 25 August 1918.

Stephen R. Jones made two more round trips to France, arriving at Philadelphia at the end of the final one on 3 March 1919. From Philadelphia, she was routed to Virginia where, on 8 March 1919, she was decommissioned and returned to the Crowell and Thurlow Steamship Company at Newport News.

Once again SS Stephen R. Jones, she returned to commercial service with the Mystic Steamship Company, remaining in mercantile use until she was wrecked in the Cape Cod Canal on 28 June 1942. The canal reopened on July 31 after the wrecked Stephen R. Jones was removed with the help of 17 tons of dynamite.

Although, like most commercial ships commissioned into the U.S. Navy during World War I, Stephen R. Jones received a naval registry Identification Number (Id. No.) -- in her case Id. No. 4526—she appears to have had it assigned retroactively, years after her Navy service.
