= Charles Henry Jones (businessman) =

American businessman (1855–1933)

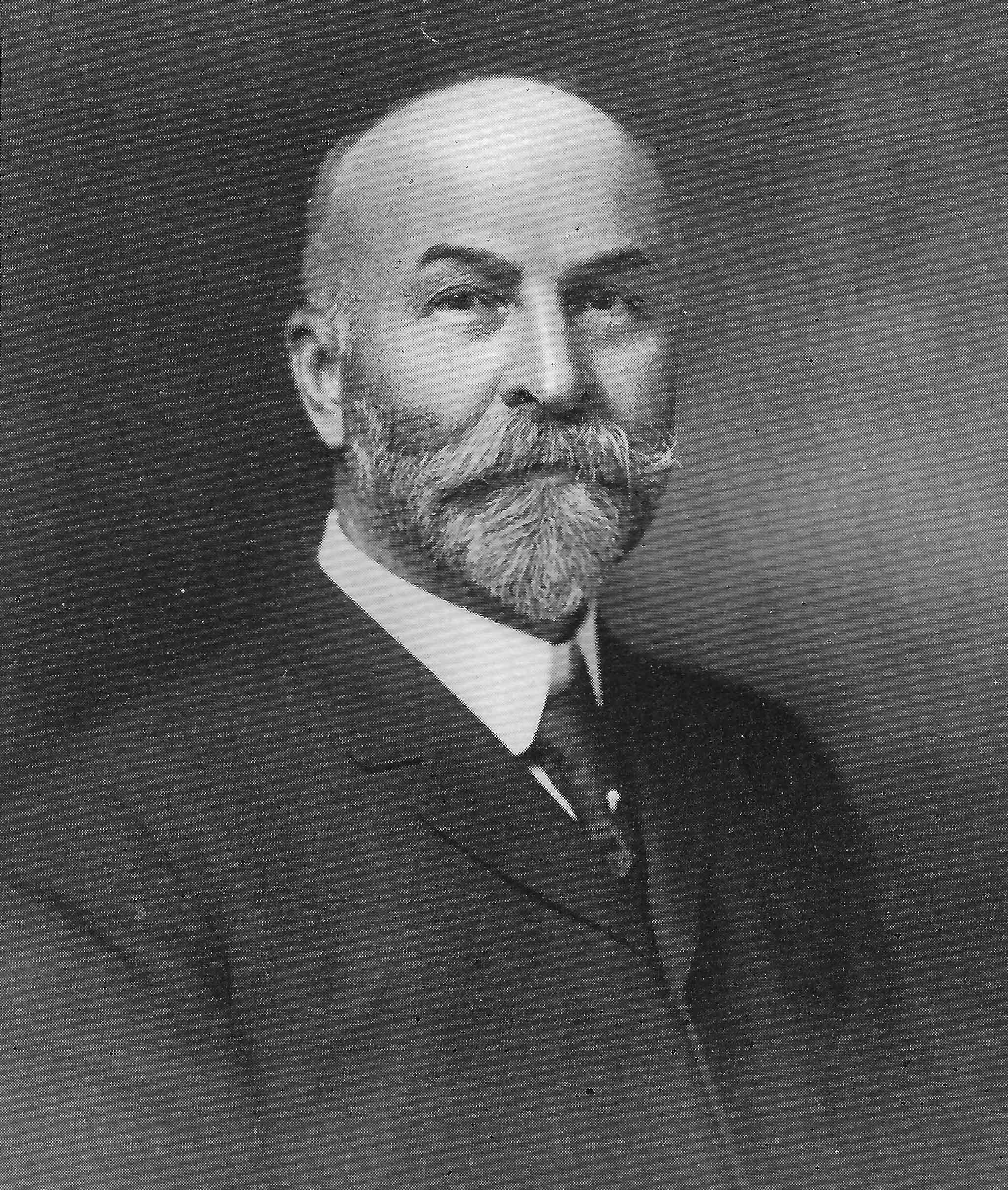
- Born: April 10, 1855; Ashefield, Massachusetts, US
- Died: November 2, 1933 (aged 78); Weston, Massachusetts, US
- Occupation: Captain of industry
- Spouse: Bessie Roberts
- Children: 4

Signature
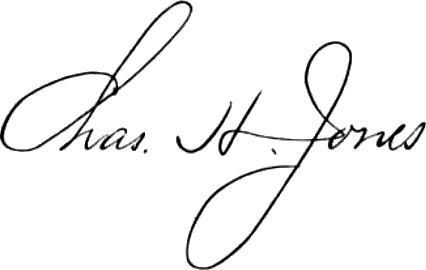

Charles H. Jones (April 10, 1855 – January 4, 1933) was an American capitalist and philanthropist, who amassed a fortune engaging in many fields of business and industry including leather and shoe manufacturing, cattle breeding, dairy farming, and real estate development.

Born to Isaac Rodney Jones and Harriet (Sears) Jones, Charles married Bessie Roberts of Boston in December 1882, and fathered four children.

== Leather and shoe manufacturing ==
Jones began work in the shoe industry in his mid-teens. In 1881 at the age of 26, he and Henry B. Endicott established the shoe manufacturing company Charles H. Jones & Co. in Whitman, Massachusetts. By 1885, the partners’ business had merged with the Bay State Shoe & Leather Co. to form the Commonwealth Shoe and Leather Co, and had begun manufacturing what became the hugely popular Bostonian shoe. Known for high quality and comfort, The Bostonian is still sold today. By 1902 the manufacturing company had begun to sell directly to shoe retailers in addition to wholesalers, garnering even greater profits.

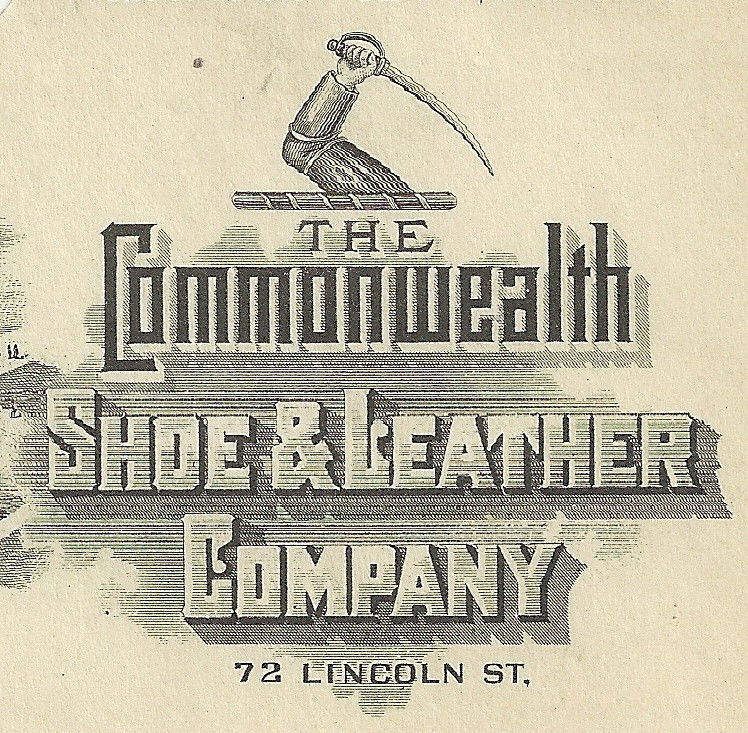

At the start of 1906, sales through the Commonwealth Shoe and Leather Company office located at 72 Lincoln Street in Boston's shoe district were international in scope, and the company was operating steam-powered factories in the three New England cities of Whitman, Massachusetts (the largest and original site), Gardiner, Maine, and Skowhegan, Maine, with a combined employment of 3,000 workers, and an output of 7,000 pairs of shoes per day.

== Public life ==
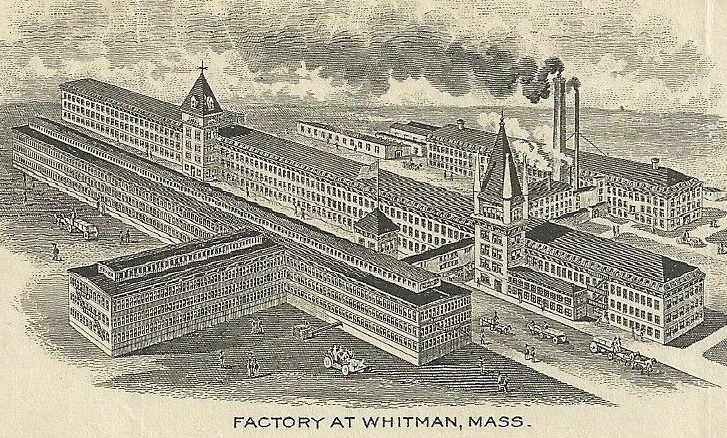
Commonwealth Shoe & Leather Company, Main Factory 1911

Jones's prominence in the shoe manufacturing business led to him being considered by some to be the most knowledgeable person in the world on the subject. His business interests led him to become active in public policy, fighting unceasingly in Washington to keep the import of leather hides free from tariffs. He assisted in the framing of four tariff acts:

- The Dingley Act of 1897
- Payne–Aldrich Tariff Act of 1909
- Underwood-Simmons Act of 1913
- Fordney–McCumber Tariff Act of 1922

In 1909 Dartmouth College recognized him with an honorary master's degree. Although he had frequently been mentioned as a possible candidate for Governor, Jones refused the Democratic nomination for Lieutenant Governor of Massachusetts and never sought public office. He did accept the position of Director of the First National Bank of Boston, Batchelder & Lincoln Co., Transportation Committee Chairman for the Boston Chamber of Commerce, held executive offices for the New England Shoe & Leather Association, the National Bank of Redemption and the Boylston Machinery Company. Club memberships included the Guernsey Club of Boston, Boston City, Exchange, Boot & Shoe, Eastern and Beverly Yacht Clubs. Jones attended the First Baptist Church of Weston, was a Trustee of the Gordon College of Theology and Missions and served as a Director of the Evangelistic Association of Missions.

Recreation included sailing on his 30' sailboat The Ashumet, farming and hunting. Interests ranged from art, education and literature, to travel and improving methods in manufacturing.

== Dairy farming in Weston ==
In 1901, Jones began his business venture in cattle breeding and dairy farming by accumulating a set of poor, largely abandoned neighboring farms in Weston, Massachusetts. Spanning 270 acres (109 ha), the resulting Filmore Farm grounds were then designed by renowned landscape architect Frederick Law Olmsted to incorporate a greenhouse, vegetable garden and multi-use open spaces.

Jones built his first dairy barn, a monumental five story structure, in 1903. By 1913 Jones had erected a second large barn, known as the "testing barn," fitted with new stainless steel pipes, and pasteurizing and bottling equipment, where daily milk output was weighed and recorded. This was also where he stabled his purebred, world-champion Guernsey bulls that could bring as much as $2,000 during the occasional cattle auction held on the property.

More than a dozen buildings still remain from the Charles Jones Estate on 458 Glen Road, including the main house and carriage house, staff cottages and one of the last remaining ice houses in Weston.

== Real estate development ==
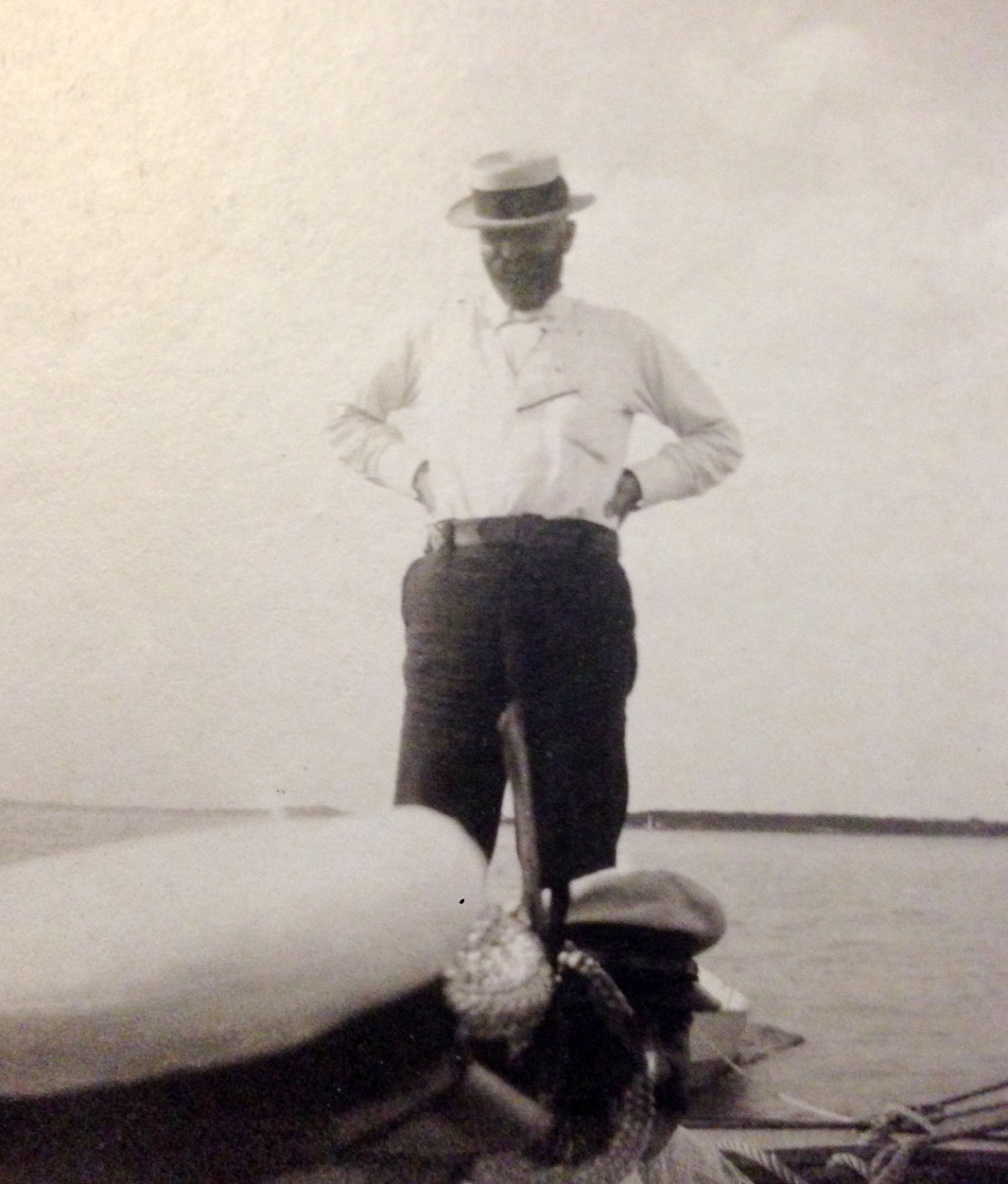
C.H. Jones on the Ashumet, Buzzards Bay early 1900s

Located in West Falmouth, Massachusetts, Chapoquoit Island was previously known as "Hog Island"; the name Chapoquoit is thought to have been modeled after that of a band from a local Native American tribe, the Chappaquiddick Wampanoag.

Franklin King and Nathaniel Coleman purchased the island in 1872 from Joshua and Daniel Bowerman, but a depression in 1873 prevented any further development. In June 1889 Coleman sold his one-third share to Charles H. Jones for $800. A series of complex legal maneuvers ensued with the Town of Falmouth regarding the building of a causeway to connect the island with the mainland. By appealing strictly to a select economic level, thirty eight parcels were sold at a price high enough to satisfy the required tax base. Borrowing ideas from Jones's Weston home, many were landscaped by Frederick Law Olmsted. In many cases the homes have remained in the same families for generations.
