= Operation Anglo =

1942 British Commando raid on Rhodes in WWII

- Part of the Mediterranean and Middle East theatre of the Second World War
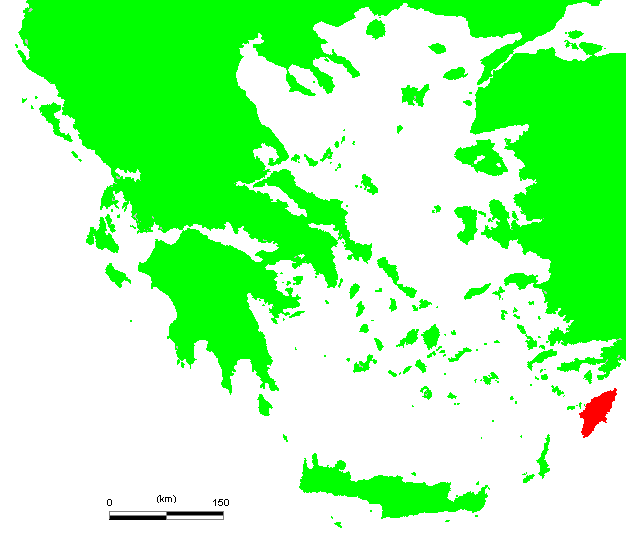
- Map of Greece, the Greek Islands and Turkey; Rhodes is highlighted in red
Date	31 August – 18 September 1942
Location	Rhodes 36.17°N 27.92°E
Result	Allied victory

Belligerents
United Kingdom; Greece	(Nazi Germany) Germany (Fascist Italy) Italy

Commanders and leaders
(United Kingdom) Captain Allott	

Units involved
Special Boat Section (SBS)	

Strength
8 British Commandos; 4 Greeks	30,000 garrison

Casualties and losses
10 captured	At least 33 aircraft destroyed and some fuel supplies

Operation Anglo was a British Commando raid on the island of Rhodes during the Second World War. The raid was carried out by eight men of the Special Boat Section (SBS) assisted by four Greeks.

In September 1942 their mission was to attack two airfields on the island of Rhodes. The German and Italian bombers based there were being used to attack Royal Navy convoys. After their attack, the raiding force were to return to their landing beach to be picked up by submarine. Only two surviving SBS men made it to the beach after hiding in the countryside for four days.

After the Rhodes raid the depleted SBS was absorbed into the Special Air Service, due to the casualties they had suffered. In 1954 the events of the raid were portrayed in the movie They Who Dare.

== Background ==
By 1942, No1 Special Boat Section was based in the Middle East and attached to the Special Air Service (SAS) as the Folboat Section (named after a type of folding canoe employed in raiding operations). In July, they had taken part in the raids on airfield in Crete, and were now assigned to attack two airfields on the island of Rhodes in the Dodecanese. Rhodes, a part of the Kingdom of Italy since 1912, was being used as a base for Italian and German bombers who were attacking Royal Navy convoys.

== Mission ==
The No. 1 Special Boat Section raiding force consisted of eight British Commandos, two Greek guides and two interpreters. The commander of the raid was Captain Richard Allott with Lieutenant David Sutherland as the second in command. The rest of the raiding group were Sergeant Moss, Corporal McKenzie, Private Blake, and Marines Barrow, Harris and Duggan. The Greeks included Sub Lieutenant Calambokidis, Pavlos Moustakellis, and Antonios Moustakellis, and an unidentified fourth believed to be Loukas Tsapatzis.

The raiding force left Beirut in two submarines, HMS Traveller and the Greek submarine Papanikolis. Their objective were two airfields on the island of Rhodes at Kalathos and Maritsa. They reached Rhodes on 31 August 1942. The raiders were landed by using a folding boat and three inflatable floats to reach the shore on the east coast of Rhodes near Cape Feralco. After hiding their boats in some nearby caves they rested for the first day before splitting into two groups. One group, under command of Lieutenant Sutherland, headed for Kalathos 8 miles (13 km) from the beach. The second group, under command of Captain Allott, made for Maritsa (15 miles (24 km) from the beach). Having no radio to contact the Royal Navy or their headquarters, they agreed to return to the beach on the night of 17/18 September to be picked up.

Allott's group penetrated their airfield, and planted their explosives. The following day they estimated from the damage they could see on the airfield, that at least 20 aircraft had been destroyed. Sutherland's group reached Kalathos over the night of 11/12 September. They established an overlooking position to observe the airfield, and settled in to identify targets and observe the airfield for the next day. The following day, they divided into two smaller groups and started their attack. Sutherland and John Duggan formed one group, with and Sub Lieutenant Calambokidis and two SBS soldiers comprising the second. In torrential rain, both groups infiltrated the airfield and placed their charges; Sutherland and Duggan placing charges on at least 13 aircraft and around a fuel dump. However, the men were spotted and fled the airfield. Only Sutherland and Duggan reached the prearranged rendezvous point, and heard shooting coming from the direction they believed the other SBS was located.

The following day, Sutherland and Duggan began their return journey to a rendezvous point near the beach with the expectation that the entire raiding force would reassemble. No one else had arrived, and in the meantime an Italian patrol ship had disembarked soldiers on the beach who had found the hidden boats. The two left a message at the rendezvous for any stragglers, and returned to the beach. Using a torch, they signalled "swimming-come in" to HMS Traveller, which was waiting off shore. The captain of the submarine, Commander Michael St John, was surprised to see the recognition signal coming from the shore and replied by using his periscope to signal back. The boat then moved towards the remnants of the raiding force and expecting to pick them up from their boats. Upon hearing the men shouting in the darkness, the crew of the submarine retrieved the two swimmers. The submarine was spotted by a patrol boat; with the SBS members on board it crash-dived and survived a depth charge attack.

== Aftermath ==
The remaining members of the raiding party were captured, and became prisoners of war. The two Greek guides, who had already escaped from Rhodes earlier in the war, were put on trial accused of treason. Both were found guilty; one was executed and the other imprisoned. Sutherland was awarded the Military Cross and Duggan the Military Medal for their parts in the raid.

After the Rhodes raid what remained of the SBS was absorbed into the SAS due to the casualties suffered. The submarine HMS Traveller was lost with all hands two months after the operation. Captain St John was not on board at the time and survived the war.

In 1954 the events of the raid were portrayed in the movie They Who Dare, starring Dirk Bogarde and Harold Siddons.

== Bibliography ==
- Breuer, William B. (2001). Daring Missions of World War II. John Wiley and Sons. ISBN 978-0-471-40419-4.
- Chappell, Mike (1996). Army Commandos 1940–1945. Elite Series # 64. Oxford: Osprey. ISBN 1-85532-579-9.
- Davis, Paul Harcourt (2006). Rhodes Globetrotter Travel Pack Series. New Holland Publishers. ISBN 1-84537-499-1.
- Haskew, Michael E (2007). Encyclopaedia of Elite Forces in the Second World War. Barnsley: Pen and Sword. ISBN 1-905704-27-5.
- Molinari, Andrea (2007). Desert Raiders: Axis and Allied Special Forces 1940–43. Osprey. ISBN 978-1-84603-006-2.
- Richards, Brooks (2004). Secret Flotillas: Clandestine Sea Operations in the Mediterranean, North Africa and the Adriatic, 1940–1944. London: Routledge. ISBN 0-7146-5314-4.
- Vick, Alan (1995). Snakes in the Eagle's Nest: A History of Ground Attacks on Air Bases. Rand Corporation. ISBN 0-8330-1629-6.
