= Battle of Rhodes (1943) =

1943 German invasion during World War II

- Part of the Dodecanese campaign of the Second World War
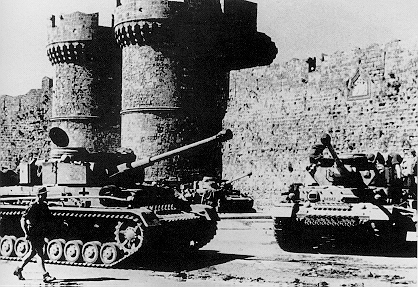
- German Panzer IVs in Rhodes.
Date	9–11 September 1943
Location	Rhodes Island, Aegean Sea 36°20′12″N 27°55′12″E
Result	German victory
Territorial changes	German occupation of Rhodes

Belligerents
Italy	Germany

Commanders and leaders
(Kingdom of Italy) Inigo Campioni (surrendered)	(Nazi Germany) Ulrich Kleemann

Strength
39,100 men (34,000 Army, 3,000 Air Force, 2,100 Navy)	6,000–8,000 men

Casualties and losses
447 dead 300 wounded 30,000 POW	1 merchant ship captured

The Battle of Rhodes took place between Italian and German forces for the control of Rhodes, a Greek island in the Italian (1912–1943) Dodecanese islands in the Aegean Sea. The Italian authorities in Rome had been negotiating the Armistice of Cassibile with the Allies and the Germans had been manoeuvring to launch a coup in Italy and Italian-garrisoned areas in southern Europe, at the first sign of treachery to the Axis. German troops had been sent to Rhodes with tanks, artillery and air support. The British deception Operation Mincemeat intended to divert German attention from Sicily may have added to German apprehensions over the Aegean area.

== Background ==
When the Armistice of Cassibile was announced, on 8 September 1943, Admiral Inigo Campioni was the governor of the Italian Dodecanese, the Cyclades and the Northern Sporades; his seat was in Rhodes. The military commander of the Italian forces in the archipelago was Rear Admiral Carlo Daviso di Charvensod. With no orders from Rome and no information about the situation of the Italian armed forces, the high command of the Italian armed forces in the Aegean (Egeomil) also in Rhodes, had to choose whether it should remain loyal to the Axis or to Victor Emanuel III. The Italian commands in the Aegean decided to consider the Germans as enemies.

=== Rhodes garrison ===
==== Italian ====
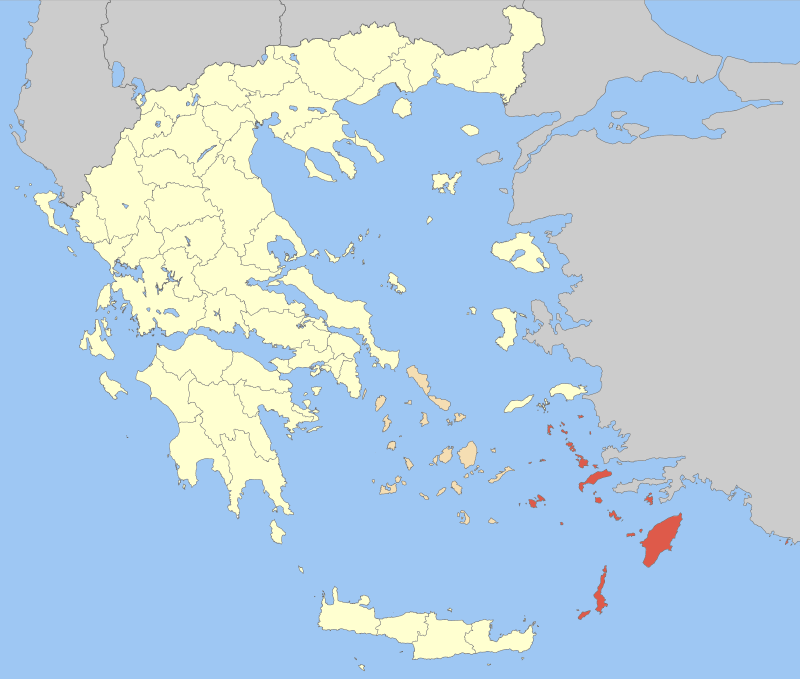
The Dodecanese Archipelago in the Aegean Sea

Campioni had his headquarters in Rhodes with his chief of staff was Brigadier-General Roberto Sequi. The Rhodes HQ was subordinate to Army Group East (Gruppo d'Armate Est) based in Tirana in Albania. On 1 September 1943, Lieutenant-General Arnaldo Foriero had been sent to Rhodes to assume command of the Italian garrison and to create the Rhodes Military Command but at the time of the German invasion, many of the internal fortifications scheduled to be built were incomplete, due to lack of resources.

The Italian garrison comprised the 50th Infantry Division "Regina" (Major General Michele Scaroina) with four infantry regiments and one artillery regiment equipped with 75/27 mm guns, the 35th, 36th and 55th Static Artillery Groups and the 56th Anti-Aircraft Artillery Group. The anti-aircraft group was equipped with 75/27 and 90/53 mm guns and the static artillery groups had 46 batteries and 9 autonomous sections, armed with 210/8 mortars, 149/150 mm howitzers and 105/28 and 75/27 guns. The division had been in the Dodecanese since 1939 and lacked a battalion of the 9th Infantry Regiment, that had been detached to garrison Karpathos and the 10th Infantry Regiment, which garrisoned Kos. In Rhodes were the artillery regiment (on Mount Fileremo and other positions), the 309th Infantry Regiment, the 331st Infantry Regiment from the 11th Infantry Division "Brennero" and the two remaining battalions of the 9th Infantry Regiment. Overall, the army troops available in Rhodes numbered about 34,000 men, with several dozen old vehicles.

There were seven defense areas; the Rhodes Fortress Area was at the northern end of the island, Kalitea Area in the north-east, Kalathos Area in the east, Vati Area which spread from the Lindos promontory in the south-east to Alimia bay in the west and Agios Georgios Area in the north-west. The army controlled all communications within the island, except for those of the coastal batteries and sighting points, which were under Navy control. The Regia Marina commanded the Aegean Military Sea Zone (Mariegeo, Captain Mario Grassi) and the Rhodes Naval Command, (Commander Adriano Arcangioli). The latter controlled a mobile reserve, as well as eight coastal batteries and several anti-aircraft batteries. The coastal batteries were named Majorana (on Mount Smith, with three 152/40 mm guns and one 120/50 mm gun) Melchiori (three 152/40 mm guns and one 102/35 mm gun, located north of the Kalitea thermal baths) Bianco (located in Kremasti, with three 120/45 mm and one 76/17 mm gun) Dandolo (west of the Lindos promontory, with three 152/40, one 102/35 and one 76/17 gun), Morosini (east of the Lindos promontory, with three 152/40 and one 102/35 mm gun) Mocenigo (on the eastern coast of the southern end of the island, with three 120/45 and one 76/17 mm gun) Bragadino (on the western coast of the southern end of the island, with four 120/45 and one 76/17 mm gun), and Alimnia (in Alimia, with one 76/40 and two 76/50 mm guns); none of them was provided with a radio.

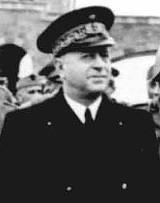
ammiraglio (Admiral) Inigo Campioni (1878–1944)

The 3rd MAS Flotilla with three Motoscafo armato silurante (motor torpedo boats), the 14th Anti-Submarine Group with two submarine chasers, the 39th Minesweeping Flotilla with eight auxiliary minesweepers, the gunboat Sebastiano Caboto (immobilised by engine trouble) and the steamer Pomezia (used as a floating refrigerated warehouse). Naval personnel on the island amounted to about 2,100 men.

The Regia Aeronautica (Air Commodore Alberto Briganti) had 3,000 personnel and about 60–65 aircraft on the island. The Gadurra air base, near Kalathos, had no aircraft, as its torpedo bombers had been transferred to Italy some months earlier and Kattavia Airfield had been abandoned in early 1943 and rendered unusable. The only operational air base was in Maritsa, where the 30th Bombing Wing had twelve bombers, one transport squadron with four Savoia-Marchetti SM.81 and one Savoia-Marchetti SM.75 and a group of 40 fighters, mostly FIAT CR.42 and FIAT G.50, with six Macchi C.202. Ten fighters were unserviceable and only twenty pilots were available. A CANT Z.506 flying boat, used as a hack by the governor, was based in the Mandraki seaplane base; there were also two more CANT Z.506 used as sea rescue aeroplanes and the 147th Maritime Reconnaissance Squadron, equipped with CANT Z.501s. The air bases were defended by army 20 mm anti-aircraft cannon.

==== German ====
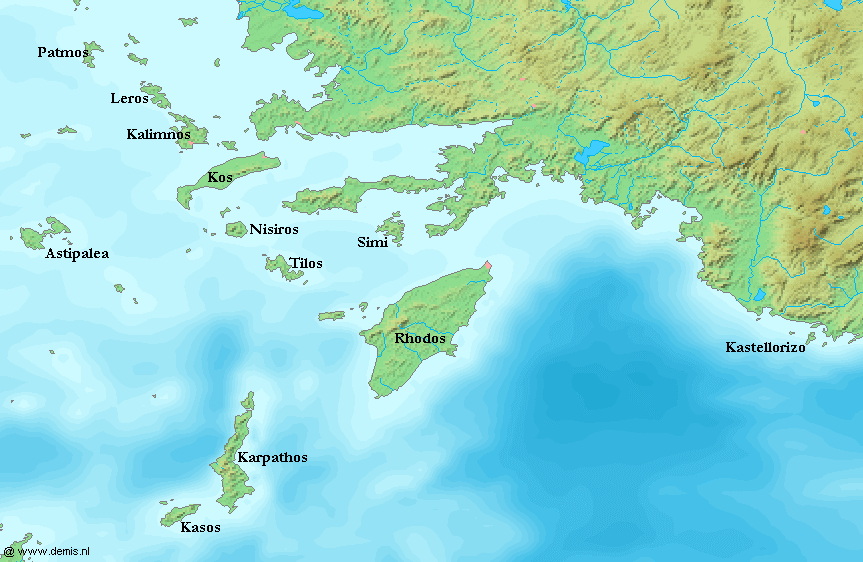
The Dodecanese Archipelago

A German attempt to put Egeomil under its control had failed but eventually the Germans reached an agreement with the Regia Aeronautica to place two 88 mm Flak batteries on the island to strengthen the anti-aircraft defense of the air bases. German personnel were to train Italians in using the Flak batteries and then depart but their stay was prolonged on the pretext of the expected shipment of more batteries. Towards the end of January 1943, four German officers, experts in coastal fortification, visited the island, and in April a panzergrenadier battalion was landed in Rhodes. During the following month, two more panzergrenadier battalions arrived.

At the end of June 1943, the German general Ulrich Kleemann was sent to Rhodes, where he formed the Sturm-Division Rhodos, which began military exercise near the Italian defenses about 6.8 mi (11 km) from the city. The Rhodos had a strength of between 6,000 and 8,000 men, and a communication network separate from the Italian system. Its command was established in Campochiaro (now Eleousa); the division included four panzergrenadier battalions with about a hundred guns, anti-tank guns, and 60–70 mortars; a reconnaissance unit with 1,500 men equipped with armed motorcycle sidecars and nearly 60 armoured cars; a tank battalion with over 25 Panzer IVs; four batteries of self-propelled guns, two of them equipped with Wespes and two with Hummel; five 88 mm Flak batteries placed near the air bases and one unit of about 300 Greeks in German uniform. The purpose of the latter was not clear and caused much complaint by the Italian command. The German forces had about 150 armoured fighting vehicles, including Panzer IIs, Panzer IVs, StuG IIIs and fifteen 150 mm self-propelled guns.

== Prelude ==
The announcement of the armistice on 8 September took the Italian leadership and soldiers in Rhodes by surprise; the memorandum with the instructions from the Comando Supremo (Italian Supreme Command) to Egeomil was to be sent by air but bad weather had prevented this and the messenger was still in Pescara on 9 September. On the evening of 8 September, Campioni asked Forgiero to contact Kleeman to exhort him not to give orders that could cause Italian reactions and Kleeman reacted calmly, stating that he would cooperate. Around 20:30, shortly after news of the armistice arrived, Campioni held a meeting at the Palace of the Grand Master; as there were no orders about how to act, no decisions were taken. Lieutenant colonel Marcello Fossetta, in charge of the Maritsa air base, informed the command that the German troops guarding the airport were gathered without weapons and watching a film show, so a sudden attack would be easy to carry out but he was ordered not to act, based on the promises given by Kleeman. Campioni only had the Badoglio Proclamation, which had been broadcast to the other Dodecanese islands, highlighting the last sentence, which ordered Italian forces to react "to eventual attacks from any other source [than the Allies]".

Daviso gave different orders, all ships that were at sea were to head for Leros, except for the MAS and motor torpedo boats, which were to remain in Rhodes; all the ships at Rhodes were ordered to be ready to move on short notice (except the gunboat Sebastiano Caboto, which was immobilized by engine trouble). The coastal batteries were alerted, the guard at the Rhodes Naval Command was strengthened and the naval landing force readied; the Naval Commands of Syros, Leros and Astypalaia were informed of the situation. Any aggressive action by German forces was to be opposed by arms. These instructions later turned out to be in line with the directives issued by Supermarina (Italian Navy high command) on 9 September. At midnight, Kleeman, now upset, asked Forgiero for permission to freely move his forces to be able to quickly oppose a possible British landing but received a strong refusal.

== Battle ==
=== September 9 ===
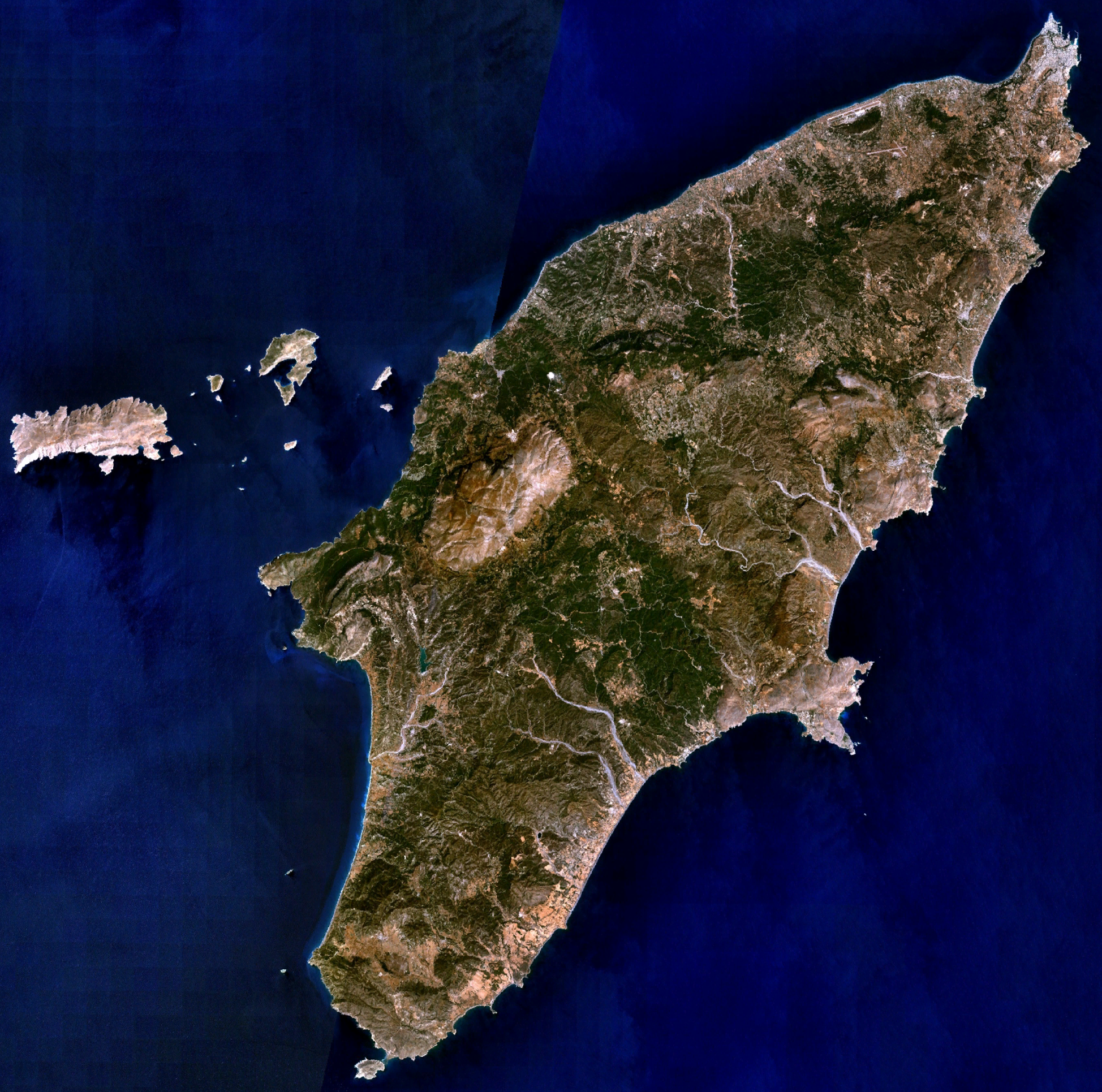
Rhodes, photographed by NLT Landsat7

During the night, Campioni and Kleemann had a heated argument over the disposition of German troops on the island. According to some (there is no consensus on what was decided) it was agreed that the Rhodos Division would take up positions near Campochiaro, while the German troops at the air bases were to remain outside of their perimeter and any movement of German troops would require authorization by the Italian command. According to others, it was decided that the Germans would stay inside the air bases and would not disarm them if no Italian unit left Rhodes. A British aircraft over Rhodes dropped thousands of leaflets signed by General Henry Maitland Wilson, head of the Middle East Command, ordering the Italians to take control of the German positions and to move their ships and aircraft to British bases; Campioni did not comply, in part because the origin of the leaflets was dubious. At 9:00 a German officer went to the harbour of Rhodes (which the Italians had closed) and asked to occupy it. The port commander, Captain Francesco Bagnus, refused. The German steamer Taganrog, loaded with ammunition, was moored in the harbour and her captain asked for permission to unload and leave the island. Daviso denied authorization and instead posted sentries to guard the ship. After several minutes the harbour was opened and the Germans unloaded the crates containing the ammunition.

The first German attacks began around noon; the Italians returned fire. Swift action against the Regina Division led to the capture of General Scaroina, who ordered his men to surrender. The Rhodes Military Command was alerted to what was happening, and Forgiero was ordered to move to the city of Rhodes to avoid complete capture of his command. Some vehicles of his escort were intercepted by German forces and Forgiero only reached the city around 15:00, half an hour after the Germans had occupied the Maritsa air base. Daviso proposed sending the destroyer Euro, which was at Leros, to bombard the air base but the suggestion was rejected; Briganti obtained permission from Campioni to use the artillery. The guns destroyed the German tanks that had occupied the airport but also hit the Italian aircraft that were still there. When the noise of the shelling was heard in the harbour, Bagnus ordered the capture of Taganrog. The ship had a mixed Greek and German crew; the Greeks were released, while the Germans were taken prisoner and brought to the city. A new Italian crew was placed aboard the ship and the next day it left Rhodes for Symi. The Bianco battery inflicted losses on German vehicles at the Maritsa air base but was seriously damaged and had to be abandoned. The Dandolo battery was encircled and defended itself for a short time, after which its personnel were taken prisoner. The gunners freed themselves on the afternoon of 10 September.

=== September 10 ===
On the night of 9/10 September, British Majors Julian Dolbey (who spoke Italian and acted as interpreter) and George Jellicoe and a sergeant with a portable radio parachuted onto Rhodes; they were brought to the Palace of the Grand Master, where they met with Campioni. They asked how long Rhodes could hold out and explained that it would be at least a week before any British reinforcements could arrive. Campioni suggested air raids and landings in the southern part of the island to divert German attention from the city of Rhodes but Dolbey replied that they lacked the means to meet these requests. At 13:00 Dolbey, who had been injured in landing with his parachute, was given a letter from Campioni to Wilson asking for assistance and was evacuated to Symi on a motor torpedo boat.

Early on the morning of 10 September a German motorized formation began moving towards Maritsa, although its advance was slowed by artillery fire from Mount Paradiso and Mount Fileremo, where isolated Italian Army units remained in action. At 9:00 a German aircraft dropped leaflets offering safe passage to Italy in exchange for surrender. An hour later the destroyer Euro arrived with 200 reinforcements from Kos. As units from the inland part of the island were already reinforcing the garrison of the city of Rhodes, Euro was sent back to Kos with its troops. In the afternoon, the Maritsa battery, which was firing on the tanks that occupied the Maritsa air base, returned fire against some German 88 mm guns; together with the Melchiori battery and some mortars, they silenced the German guns, inflicting heavy casualties and losing six men. In the evening, German troops captured the positions on Mount Paradiso and Mount Fileremo and later more positions were taken. At 19:45 Jellicoe and the British sergeant, together with the Italian colonel Fanizza and an Italian major, were sent to Kastelorizo, where they were to further discuss the situation and the dispatch of reinforcements to Rhodes. During the night, Campioni was informed of the surrender of Italian forces in Greece and Crete, which further weakened his position.

=== September 11 ===
At 7:00 German air attacks damaged the Majorana battery and put the Navy radio station out of action. A British colonel arrived and immediately met Campioni, who once more asked for diversionary actions and for fighters to oppose the Luftwaffe. The colonel asked if he believed that a German attack on the city of Rhodes was imminent and how long the Italian garrison would be able to resist; then he was accompanied to the harbour and sent to Kastelorizo. At 8:00, an officer of the Regina Division, escorted by a German officer of the Rhodos Division, arrived with a message from Scaroina, asking for an end to the fighting in the southern part of the island. Campioni replied that the battle would go on, while he waited for a meeting with Kleemann. At 10:30 two more German officers informed the Italian command that the surrender conditions dictated by OKW were for the cessation of hostilities throughout the island, the release of German prisoners and the unconditional surrender of the Italian forces. One of the German officers added that the final conditions would be arranged with Kleemann and that Campioni had half an hour to decide, after which the city of Rhodes would be bombed.

Campioni took stock of the situation with his staff; as no British reinforcements were due to arrive soon, the military situation was considered to be desperate. Although Army units continued to resist and the city and harbour were still in Italian hands, only four artillery batteries (the Majorana battery and three anti-aircraft units) remained in action, and a German bombing of the city was certain to cause civilian casualties. It was decided to negotiate a surrender. False reports circulated that German tanks had entered the city and some ships left the harbour on their own initiative, followed by others, believing they were carrying out orders that could not be received. Daviso later ordered them to sail for Leros (according to others, they were ordered to leave Rhodes by Campioni, or by Corradini). At 15:30 Campioni, Forgiero and Daviso met Kleemann near the city. It was decided that Campioni would retain his position as governor; the Italian units would not be disbanded but would be disarmed, except for officers, who would be allowed to keep their weapons.

The German command would remain outside the city of Rhodes and no German units would enter it, except under specific conditions. The Italians destroyed code books and secret documents but kept a secret radio station in a farmhouse; the Italian government in Brindisi was informed. Italian troops reacted with anger and incredulity to the news of the surrender, as in some areas they had contained the German attacks and believed that the Germans were running out of fuel and ammunition. Some soldiers reportedly assumed that the news was referring to a German surrender, such was their apparent advantage over the enemy. Some German units had been forced to surrender during the battle and had been imprisoned in the Italian barracks; they were now released and given back their weapons, much to the indignation of the Italian soldiers who had fought against them. Many cried, said that Rhodes had been "sold out" or that their commanders had "become crazy", accused Campioni of being pro-German and shattered the butts of their rifles before throwing them in the heaps.

== Aftermath ==
The Italian surrender confronted the Germans with the problem of how to handle such a large number of prisoners, with no ships available for their immediate removal. The navy and air force contingents were disarmed first, as they were determined not to co-operate and potentially more dangerous than the army, some of whose officers were showing signs of friendship towards the Germans. Kleemann had Campioni order the garrison of Karpathos to surrender, threatening to bomb the island otherwise. When Kleemann ordered him to give the same orders to Kos and Leros, Campioni refused. Soon the Germans installed themselves within the Italian command and the Italian officers, Campioni included, were evacuated. During this period many Italians tried to flee by sea to escape captivity but often these attempts did not end well and the fugitives died at sea or were discovered by the Germans. Some managed to reach Kos and Leros. The Alimia garrison, commanded by Sub-Lieutenant Cinicola, was ordered to surrender by an Italian general but refused; Cinicola gathered his men and soldiers that had reached the island and they moved to Leros with their weapons, ammunition and provisions.

SS Oria; ran aground and sank during a storm on 12 February 1944

On 19 September 1943, between 1,584 and 1,835 Italian naval and air force prisoners, were embarked the captured Italian motorship Donizetti, which then sailed for mainland Greece. During the voyage the ship was intercepted and sunk by HMS Eclipse, unaware of the prisoners, with no survivors. On 12 February 1944 the old steamer SS Oria, carrying over 4,000 prisoners from Rhodes, ran aground during a storm and sank off Cape Sounion; only 21 prisoners were rescued, while at least 4,062 were lost. Some soldiers were given civilian clothes by their officers to avoid capture and mingled with the local population. A small number adhered to the German cause or to the Italian Social Republic (RSI). About 1,580 Italian soldiers managed to escape from Rhodes after the surrender and 6,520 were listed missing after the war. Most of them had died in the sinking of the ships that carried them to Greece, some others starved to death in German prison camps on the island (the famine severely affected also the civilian population of Rhodes between 1944 and 1945). Ninety were executed after the surrender, forty of them without trial.

Campioni was taken to a prisoner-of-war camp in Poland and was later handed over to RSI authorities, tried and executed for having defended Rhodes against the German invasion. Sporadic resistance continued against the German occupation by Greek civilians and some Italians who had escaped capture; sergeant Pietro Carboni of the Regia Marina, helped by an Italian civilian and by a carabiniere, hid in the interior of the island and committed several acts of sabotage against the German forces, until he was discovered and killed on 20 December 1944 (he was posthumously awarded the Gold Medal of Military Valor).

Rhodes was held by the Germans until 8 May 1945 when the commandant of the Dodecanese islands Otto Wagener surrendered to British forces.

== Bibliography ==
- Smith, Peter; Walker, Edwin (2008) [1974]. War in the Aegean: The Campaign for the Eastern Mediterranean in WWII. Stackpole Military History. Mechanicsburg, PA: Stackpole Books. ISBN 978-0-8117-3519-3.
