= Kalathos Airfield =

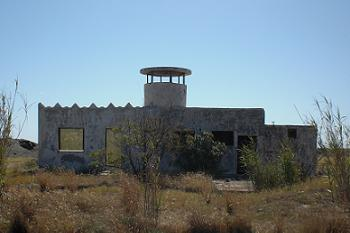
- The airfield's control tower.
- IATA: none; ICAO: none

Summary
- Airport type: Military
- Location: Kalathos, Rhodes
- Coordinates: 36°08′38.0″N 28°04′08.0″E

Map
- Location in Greece

Runways
Direction	Length		Surface
Direction	ft	m	Surface
15/33	5 577	1,700	Macadam

Kalathos Airfield (Greek: Αεροδρόμιο Κάλαθου) or Gadurra Airfield (Italian: Aeroporto di Gadurrà) was a military airport built by the Royal Italian Air Force during their occupation of Dodecanese in the 1930s.

== History ==
Kalathos Airfield was built in the 1930s along the coast of east-central Rhodes, one kilometer near the village of Kalathos and eight kilometers from Lindos. Airfield construction began in 1937 and was completed in 1939. It was named by the Italians as Airport 308. The airfield was located only meters away from the seashore. Its defense was provided with underground shelters and bunkers as well as artillery positions. In 1941 the airfield was used by the Luftwaffe during the Battle of Crete. The Royal Air Force bombed the airfield several times, but had no impact on the operations.

In 1942 a commando raid was carried out in which the two airfields of Kalathos and Maritsa were attacked simultaneously (operation Anglo). The raiding force left Beirut in two submarines, HMS Traveller and the Greek submarine Papanikolis. The commander of the raid was Captain Richard Allott with Lieutenant David Sutherland as the second in command. Sutherland's group reached Kalathos over the night of 11/12 September and attacked on the night of September 12/13 destroying at least 13 aircraft together with several fuel storage tanks. Only Sutherland and another commando were able to escape and made it back to the submarine. The remaining members of the raiding party were captured, and became prisoners of war. Sutherland was awarded the Military Cross for his part in Operation. Lewis Milestone's 1954 movie They Who Dare, starring Dirk Bogarde, Denholm Elliott and Akim Tamiroff, is based on Operation Anglo. The Lebanese Air Force provided a pair of Savoia-Marchetti SM.79 aircraft for the film.

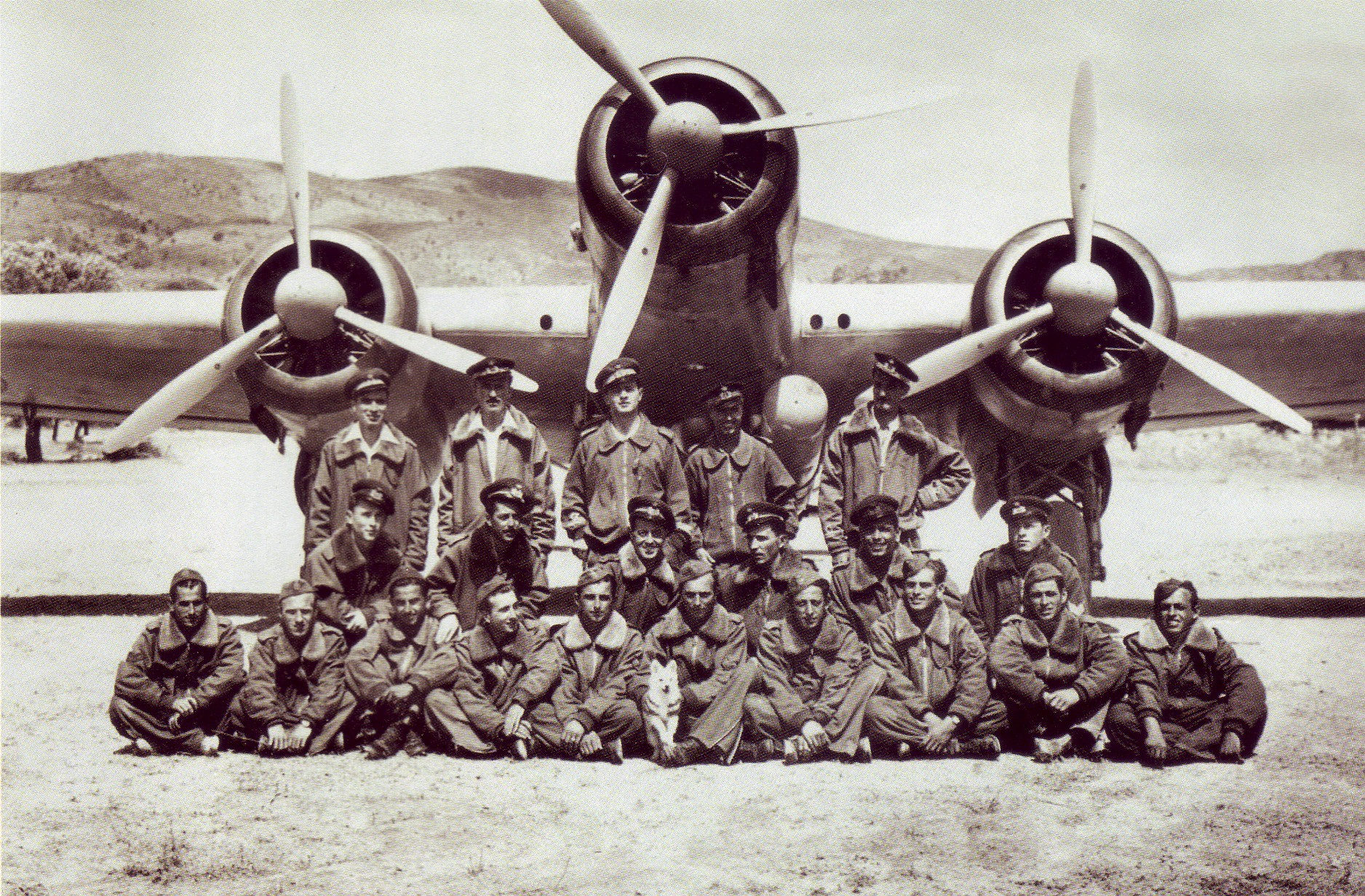
281ª Squadriglia crews pose for the camera at Gadurra airfield in 1941

In September 1943 Kalathos Airfield was the center of conflicts between Italian and German forces for the control of the island. The Italians surrendered to the Germans who took over the airport until the end of the Second World War. Kalathos Airfield was one of the most important Italian torpedo bomber airfields and from here the Eastern part of the Mediterranean could be covered. It was also used by the Italian Royal Air Force for air raids on British colonies in the Middle East, such as bombings on British Palestine and on refineries in Bahrain.

== Present-day ==
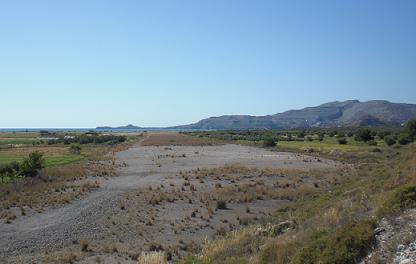
The airfield as can be seen from the road

In September–October 1944 Rhodes was evacuated by the Luftwaffe leaving just 120 officers and men behind as caretakers for Maritza and Gadurra. After the end of the war the airfield was abandoned.

The EO95 highway was built over the northern end of the runway burying much of what had remained of its concrete bunkers. The airfield is beginning to get overgrown, but on the sea side of the runway many concrete facilities still exist. Although the runway is still visible from the road, it is easily missed, as the surrounding area has been covered with olive trees. On the beach you can visit the remains of the fortifications, several pieces of barbed wire and remains of crates and barrels.

== See also ==
- Battle of Rhodes (1943)
- Regia Aeronautica
