= Luigi Viviani (disambiguation) =

Luigi Viviani (born 1937) is an Italian politician.

Luigi Viviani may also refer to:

- Luigi Viviani (soldier) (1903–1943), Italian engineer and soldier
- Luigi Viviani (composer), 19th-century opera composer, see Felice Romani
