= Aristotelis Zervoudis =

Greek professional diver (born 1964)

- Αριστοτέλης Ζερβούδης
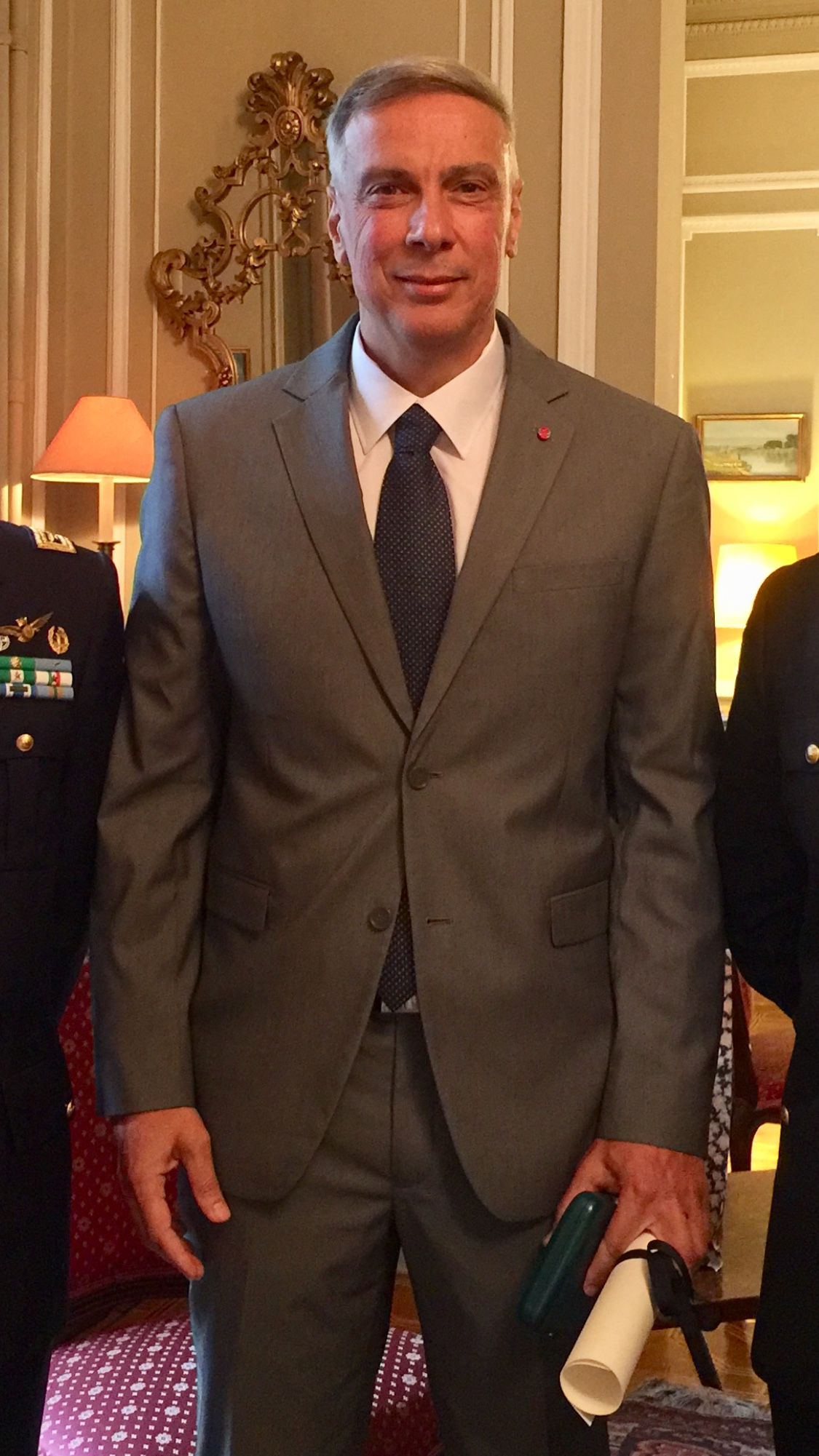
- A. Zervoudis in the ceremony of his appointment as "Cavaliere dell' Ordine della Stella d' Italia" in June 2018
- Born: 1964; Athens, Greece
- Occupation: professional diver

Aristotelis ("Telis") Zervoudis (Greek: Αριστοτέλης Ζερβούδης; b. in Athens in 1964) is a professional diver from Greece.

== Notable discoveries ==
During his diving expeditions he discovered and identified several important wrecks, including:

- SS Oria – a steamship which sank in 1944 causing over 4100 deaths. This is the 4th worst naval disaster in maritime history and the worst in the Mediterranean.
- U-133 – a German submarine sank in 1942.
- The SS Heimara, sunk in 1947, the worst naval tragedy in Greece during peacetime with 389 losses.

== Accolades ==
For his services during the diving expeditions on the Oria and to the Italian State, he was appointed Knight of the Order of the Star of Italy (Cavaliere dell'Ordine della Stella d'Italia) by the President of Italy Sergio Mattarella in December 2017, and he received the insignia of the Order in June 2018 in a special ceremony from the Italian ambassador to Greece.

In August 2023 in Sicily he was awarded the 23rd International Maritime Award (XXIII Trofeo del Mare) for his contributions to maritime history and European solidarity.
