= Carlo Daviso di Charvensod =

Italian admiral

- Born: 22 September 1890; Pinerolo, Kingdom of Italy
- Died: 9 February 1975 (aged 84); Fossano, Italy
- Military career
- Allegiance: Kingdom of Italy
- Branch: Regia Marina
- Rank: Rear Admiral
- Commands: 256th Seaplane Squadron; Giovanni Nicotera (destroyer); Giovanni Da Verrazzano (destroyer); East Africa Naval Command; Maritime Military Zone of the Italian Aegean Islands
- Conflicts: Italo-Turkish War; World War I; Adriatic campaign; Italian invasion of Albania; Battle of Durres; World War II; Battle of Rhodes
- Awards: Silver Medal of Military Valour; Bronze Medal of Military Valour; War Cross for Military Valor; Military Order of Savoy

Carlo Daviso di Charvensod (Pinerolo, 22 September 1890 – Fossano, 9 February 1975) was an Italian admiral during World War II, commander-in-chief of Italian naval forces in the Dodecanese from October 1941 to September 1943.

== Biography ==
Daviso was born in Pinerolo, Piedmont, and enrolled in the Naval Academy of Livorno in 1908, graduating in 1911 with the rank of ensign. He took part in the Italo-Turkish War serving on the armoured cruiser Marco Polo; in 1913 he sailed to China with the same ship, and in 1914-1915 he was part of the Regia Marina detachment of Shanghai. After promotion to lieutenant, he participated in the First World War serving onboard the destroyer Giuseppe Cesare Abba and the scout cruiser Marsala until 1917, when he attended the Navy aviation school in Taranto and was assigned to the Naval Air Service as seaplane pilot and navigator. On 1 June 1917 he was assigned as navigator to the 255th Seaplane Squadron, and by 20 April 1918 he commanded the 256th Squadron. He was awarded a Silver Medal of Military Valour and a Bronze Medal of Military Valour for his activities during the war.

Between 1921 and 1924, with the rank of lieutenant commander, he was in command of torpedo boats, and in 1927-1928 he commanded the destroyer Giovanni Nicotera; in 1933-1934, after promotion to commander, he commanded the destroyer Giovanni da Verrazzano. He was then promoted to captain and appointed in 1937-1938 as naval commander in Italian East Africa, with headquarters in Massawa, and in 1939 he participated in the conquest of Albania, earning a War Cross for Military Valor for his role in the capture of Durres.

In 1940, after the Armistice of Villa Incisa with France, he was assigned to the Armistice Commission set up in Bizerte. He was later repatriated and assigned to Maritrafalba, the naval command tasked with supervising traffic with Albania (with headquarters in Brindisi), being awarded the Knight's Cross of the Military Order of Savoy for his accomplishments.

In October 1941 he was given command of the Maritime Military Zone of the Italian Aegean Islands (Mariegeo), with headquarters in Rhodes; he was promoted to rear admiral and held this post till the Armistice of Cassibile. On 13 September 1943 he was captured by the Germans after the end of the battle of Rhodes, and was then sent as prisoner of war to Oflag 64/Z in Schokken, Poland, where he remained until liberation by the Red Army in January 1945. After being repatriated, he remained at the disposal of the Directorate General for Personnel, and left the Navy in 1947.

He died in Fossano in 1975.
