= Luigi Viviani (soldier) =

Italian engineer and soldier (1903–1943)

- Born: 23 November 1903; Crema, Lombardy
- Died: 27 September 1943 (aged 39); Athens, Greece
- Cause of death: Execution by firing squad
- Spouse: Jolanda Barbaglio (m. 1935–1943)
- Military career
- Allegiance: Kingdom of Italy
- Branch: Royal Italian Army
- Service years: 1942 – 1943
- Rank: Captain
- Units: 86th Group, 232nd Battery 90/53
- Conflicts: Second Italo-Ethiopian War; World War II
- Awards: Gold Medal of Military Valour

Luigi Viviani (23 November 1903 – 27 September 1943) was an Italian engineer and soldier, posthumously awarded the Gold Medal of Military Valour.

== Biography ==
Luigi Viviani, the fourth son of Giovanni and Rosa Fusar Poli, attended primary school and gymnasium in Crema. He then moved to Milan to attend the liceo classico (classical high school) and eventually enrolled in the faculty of civil engineering, graduating on 30 December 1926.

=== Activity in Azione Cattolica ===
Viviani's father, a physician, was of liberal ideas while his mother, a believer, took care of the religious education of Louis and his three older brothers. In 1920 he joined the Azione Cattolica (Catholic Action) of Crema. During his studies he actively participated in the initiatives of the Avanguardia Giovanile Cattolica (Catholic Youth Vanguard) of Milan. He began to write a diary that remains the main document of his daily life, in which he noted, among other things, the clashes, including physical confrontations, between the young people of Azione Cattolica and the fascist squads in the years 1920–1921. In 1923 he became president of the Gioventù Cattolica (Catholic Youth) and in 1926 diocesan president of Crema. In 1931 he experienced struggles with the fascist regime that wanted to suppress Azione Cattolica and was also threatened with arrest. On 30 May 1931, the Gioventù Cattolica Italiana (Italian Catholic Youth) and the Gioventù Femminile Cattolica Italiana (Italian Catholic Female Youth) were dissolved by prefectural decree. Also, the assets of the offices of the "Belvedere" and the "circolo del Duomo" in Crema were seized. As a result of the prohibitions on gatherings among young people, both in private and in public, the direction of diocesan Azione Cattolica was entrusted to Bishop Monsignor Marcello Mimmi on 1 June 1931.

On 23 March 1934, Viviani became engaged to Jolanda Barbaglio, the diocesan delegate of the Gioventù Femminile, and they were married the following 24 April. The wedding was celebrated by the bishop of Crema, Monsignor Francesco Maria Franco, in the chapel of the Bishop's Palace. In 1937 his mother Rosa died and in 1939 his father Giovanni died.

=== Military service ===
In 1927 Viviani began his military service and carried out his first appointment in Florence. He was then recalled in the autumn of 1936, at the end of the Second Italo-Ethiopian War. On 25 June 1941 he was again recalled to the army due to World War II and, as a lieutenant of Complement in the artillery, was deployed in the Aegean Sea on the island of Rhodes. Two years passed without fighting and in June 1943, with the rank of captain, he commanded the 56th Position Anti-Aircraft Group (86th Group, 232nd Battery 90/53).

After the Armistice of Cassibile, Captain Viviani's battery was attacked by former German allies and on 17 September 1943, at Kalathos Airfield, the Italian military was forced to surrender. Viviani was identified, transferred and imprisoned with some comrades in the Averoff prison in Athens. He was shot in the early hours of the day on 27 September 1943.

== Honors ==

Commander of the battery and of the stronghold, keeping faith with the laws of military honor, he put up tenacious resistance to fierce German formations on which he inflicted severe losses and finally repelled. In subsequent harsh action he contributed with his battery to the destruction of enemy artillery. Once the general crisis emerged, he opposed the order of capitulation presented to him by the Germans and resisted them with manly firmness. Captured and sentenced to death, he faced the ultimate sacrifice with stoic pride. Sublime example of illustrious ancient Italian virtues. Aegean (Greece), 9-11-27 September 1943.

== Bibliography ==
- Bonomi, Giovanni (1947). Fede ed eroismo. Il Capitano Luigi Viviani [Faith and heroism. Captain Luigi Viviani]. Alba: Edizioni Paoline.
- AA.VV. (1995). 50 anni fa. Crema e i cremaschi dal settembre '43 all'aprile '45 [50 years ago. Crema and its people from September '43 to April '45]. Crema: Libreria Editrice Buona Stampa.
