= German submarine U-635 =

German World War II submarine

History

Nazi Germany
- Name: U-635
- Ordered: 20 January 1941
- Builder: Blohm & Voss, Hamburg
- Yard number: 611
- Laid down: 3 October 1941
- Launched: 24 June 1942
- Commissioned: 13 August 1942
- Fate: Sunk on 5 April 1943 in the North Atlantic in position 58°20′N 31°52′W, by depth charges from a RAF Liberator.

General characteristics
- Class & type: Type VIIC submarine
- Displacement: 769 tonnes (757 long tons) surfaced; 871 t (857 long tons) submerged
- Length: 67.10 m (220 ft 2 in) o/a; 50.50 m (165 ft 8 in) pressure hull
- Beam: 6.20 m (20 ft 4 in) o/a; 4.70 m (15 ft 5 in) pressure hull
- Draught: 4.74 m (15 ft 7 in)
- Installed power: 2,800–3,200 PS (2,100–2,400 kW; 2,800–3,200 bhp) (diesels); 750 PS (550 kW; 740 shp) (electric)
- Propulsion: 2 shafts; 2 × diesel engines; 2 × electric motors
- Speed: 17.7 knots (32.8 km/h; 20.4 mph) surfaced; 7.6 knots (14.1 km/h; 8.7 mph) submerged
- Range: 8,500 nmi (15,700 km; 9,800 mi) at 10 knots (19 km/h; 12 mph) surfaced; 80 nmi (150 km; 92 mi) at 4 knots (7.4 km/h; 4.6 mph) submerged
- Test depth: 230 m (750 ft); Crush depth: 250–295 m (820–968 ft)
- Complement: 4 officers, 40–56 enlisted
- Armament: 5 × 53.3 cm (21 in) torpedo tubes (4 bow, 1 stern); 14 × torpedoes or 26 TMA mines; 1 × 8.8 cm (3.46 in) deck gun (220 rounds); 1 × twin 2 cm (0.79 in) C/30 anti-aircraft gun

Service record
- Part of: 5th U-boat Flotilla; 13 August 1942 – 31 March 1943; 3rd U-boat Flotilla; 1 – 5 April 1943
- Identification codes: M 51 783
- Commanders: Oblt.z.S. Heinz Eckelmann; 13 August 1942 – 5 April 1943
- Operations: 1 patrol: 16 March – 5 April 1943
- Victories: 2 merchant ships damaged (14,894 GRT)

German submarine U-635 was a Type VIIC U-boat built for Nazi Germany's Kriegsmarine for service during World War II. She was laid down on 3 October 1941 by Blohm & Voss, Hamburg as yard number 611, launched on 24 June 1942 and commissioned on 13 August 1942 under Oberleutnant zur See Heinz Eckelmann.

== Design ==
German Type VIIC submarines were preceded by the shorter Type VIIB submarines. U-635 had a displacement of 769 tonnes (757 long tons) when at the surface and 871 tonnes (857 long tons) while submerged. She had a total length of 67.10 m (220 ft 2 in), a pressure hull length of 50.50 m (165 ft 8 in), a beam of 6.20 m (20 ft 4 in), a height of 9.60 m (31 ft 6 in), and a draught of 4.74 m (15 ft 7 in). The submarine was powered by two Germaniawerft F46 four-stroke, six-cylinder supercharged diesel engines producing a total of 2,800 to 3,200 metric horsepower (2,060 to 2,350 kW; 2,760 to 3,160 shp) for use while surfaced, two Brown, Boveri & Cie GG UB 720/8 double-acting electric motors producing a total of 750 metric horsepower (550 kW; 740 shp) for use while submerged. She had two shafts and two 1.23 m (4 ft) propellers. The boat was capable of operating at depths of up to 230 metres (750 ft).

The submarine had a maximum surface speed of 17.7 knots (32.8 km/h; 20.4 mph) and a maximum submerged speed of 7.6 knots (14.1 km/h; 8.7 mph). When submerged, the boat could operate for 80 nautical miles (150 km; 92 mi) at 4 knots (7.4 km/h; 4.6 mph); when surfaced, she could travel 8,500 nautical miles (15,700 km; 9,800 mi) at 10 knots (19 km/h; 12 mph). U-635 was fitted with five 53.3 cm (21 in) torpedo tubes (four fitted at the bow and one at the stern), fourteen torpedoes, one 8.8 cm (3.46 in) SK C/35 naval gun, 220 rounds, and one twin 2 cm (0.79 in) C/30 anti-aircraft gun. The boat had a complement of between forty-four and sixty.

== Service history ==
The boat's career began with training at 5th U-boat Flotilla on 13 August 1942, followed by active service on 1 April 1943 as part of the 3rd Flotilla for the remainder of her very short service.

In one patrol she damaged two merchant ships, for a total of 14,894 gross register tons (GRT).

=== Convoy HX 231 ===
In April 1943, U-635 joined the wolfpack Löwenherz and attacked the Eastbound convoy HX 231 bound for Liverpool from Halifax, Nova Scotia.

At 22:15 on 4 April, U-635's torpedoes struck the lead ship of the column, the British freighter Shillong. U-630 delivered the coup de grâce. She took only 12 minutes to sink.

The next target was the British refrigerated ship Waroonga, whose cargo included butter and meat from New Zealand. She was hit with 2 torpedoes, but stayed afloat thanks to the integrity of her watertight bulkheads. However, it wasn't to last as she too was despatched by U-630 the following day.

=== Fate ===
U-635 was sunk on 5 April 1943 in the North Atlantic in position 58°20′N 31°52′W, by depth charges from RAF Liberator of 120 Squadron. All hands were lost.

=== Wolfpacks ===
U-635 took part in one wolfpack, namely:

- Löwenherz (1 – 5 April 1943)

== Summary of raiding history ==
Date	Ship Name	Nationality	Tonnage (GRT)	Fate
4 April 1943	Shillong	United Kingdom	5,529	Damaged
4 April 1943	Waroonga	United Kingdom	9,365	Damaged

== Bibliography ==
- Busch, Rainer; Röll, Hans-Joachim (1999). German U-boat commanders of World War II : a biographical dictionary. Translated by Brooks, Geoffrey. London, Annapolis, Md: Greenhill Books, Naval Institute Press. ISBN 1-55750-186-6.
- Busch, Rainer; Röll, Hans-Joachim (1999). Der U-Boot-Krieg, 1939-1945: Deutsche U-Boot-Verluste von September 1939 bis Mai 1945 [German U-boat losses from September 1939 to May 1945] (in German). Vol. IV. Hamburg, Berlin, Bonn: Mittler. ISBN 3-8132-0514-2.
- Edwards, Bernard (1996). Dönitz and the Wolfpacks - The U-boats at War. pp. 179, 180, 184. ISBN 0-304-35203-9.
- Gröner, Eric; Jung, Dieter; Maass, Martin (1991). German Warships 1815-1945: U-boats and Mine Warfare Vessels. Vol. 2. Translated by Thomas, Keith; Magowan, Rachel. London: Conway Maritime Press. ISBN 0-85177-593-4.
- Sharpe, Peter (1998). U-Boat Fact File. Great Britain: Midland Publishing. ISBN 1-85780-072-9.
