= SS Oria (1920) =

Norwegian steam ship sunk in WWII

Coordinates: 37°39′N 23°59′E

History

Norway
- Name: SS Oria
- Owner: Fearnley & Eger, Oslo
- Builder: Osbourne, Graham & Co., Ltd., Sunderland
- Yard number: 222
- Launched: 17 June 1920
- Identification: Code letters: LCUS
- Fate: Sank, 12 February 1944

General characteristics
- Tonnage: 2,127 GRT; 3,540 DWT
- Length: 86.9 m (285 ft 1 in)
- Beam: 13.3 m (43 ft 8 in)
- Propulsion: 1 × triple expansion steam engine
- Speed: 10 knots (19 km/h; 12 mph)

SS Oria was a Norwegian steamer that sank on 12 February 1944, causing the death of some 4,095 Italian prisoners of war, 21 Greeks and 15 Germans. It was one of the worst maritime disasters in history, and the worst maritime disaster caused by the sinking of a single ship in the Mediterranean Sea.

== Ship ==
The Oria was built in 1920 by Osbourne, Graham & Co in Sunderland. It had a tonnage of 2,127 GRT, and was the property of the Norwegian company Fearnley & Eger of Oslo. At the beginning of World War II, it was part of a convoy sent to North Africa, and was in Casablanca when interned in June 1940, shortly after the German occupation of Norway. One year later the ship was requisitioned by the Vichy French, renamed Sainte Julienne, and used in the Mediterranean. In November 1942 it was formally returned to its former owner and therefore renamed Oria, but soon after it was assigned to the German company Mittelmeer-Reederei GmbH of Hamburg.

== Sinking ==
In the fall of 1943, after the German invasion of the Dodecanese, the Germans transferred tens of thousands of Italian prisoners to mainland Greece. These transfers were made often using unseaworthy vessels, cramming prisoners onboard without any safety standard. Several ships were sunk, either by Allied attack or by accident, causing the death of thousands of prisoners.

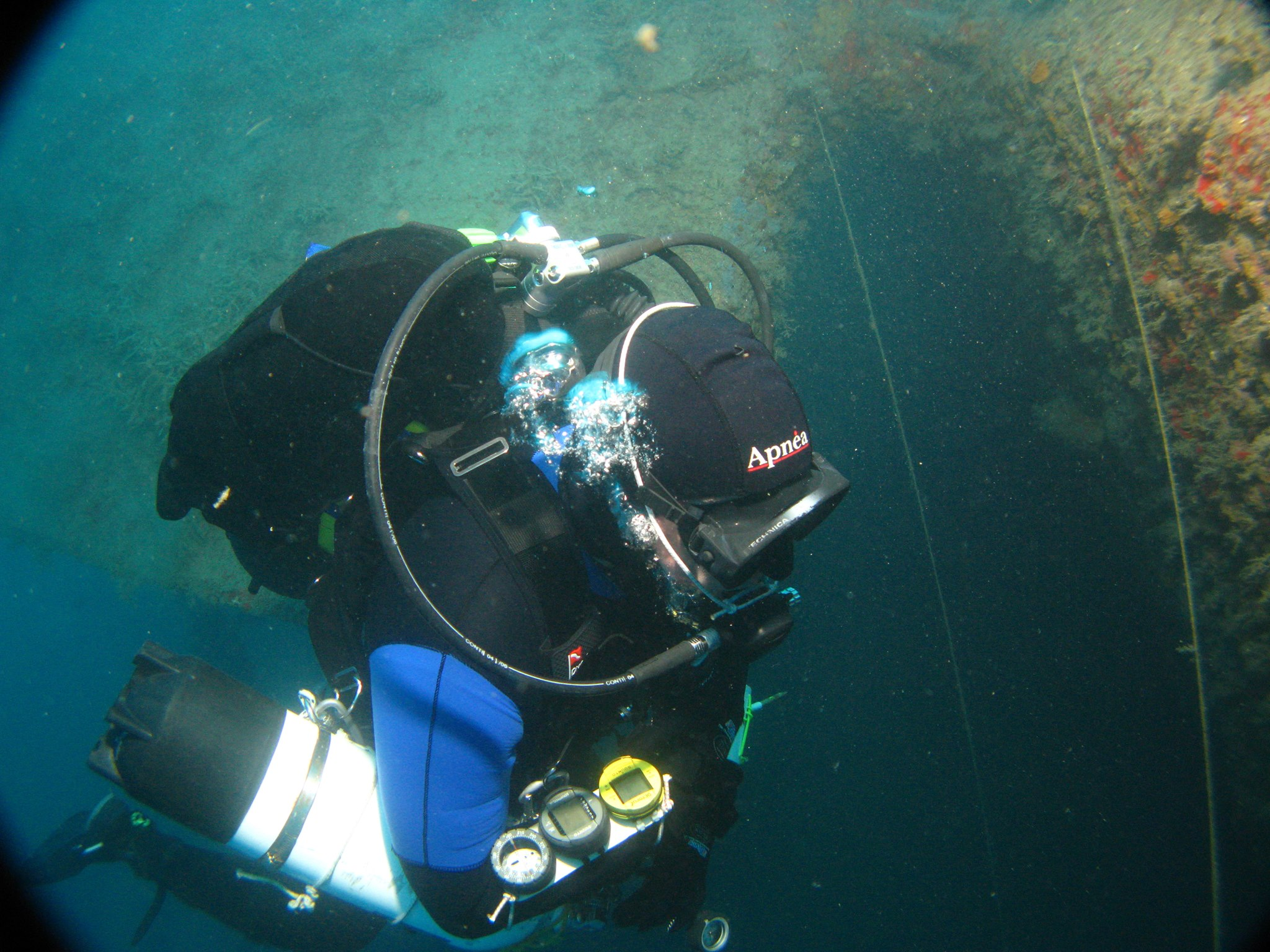
Greek diver Aristotelis Zervoudis at the SS Oria wreck near Cape Sounion

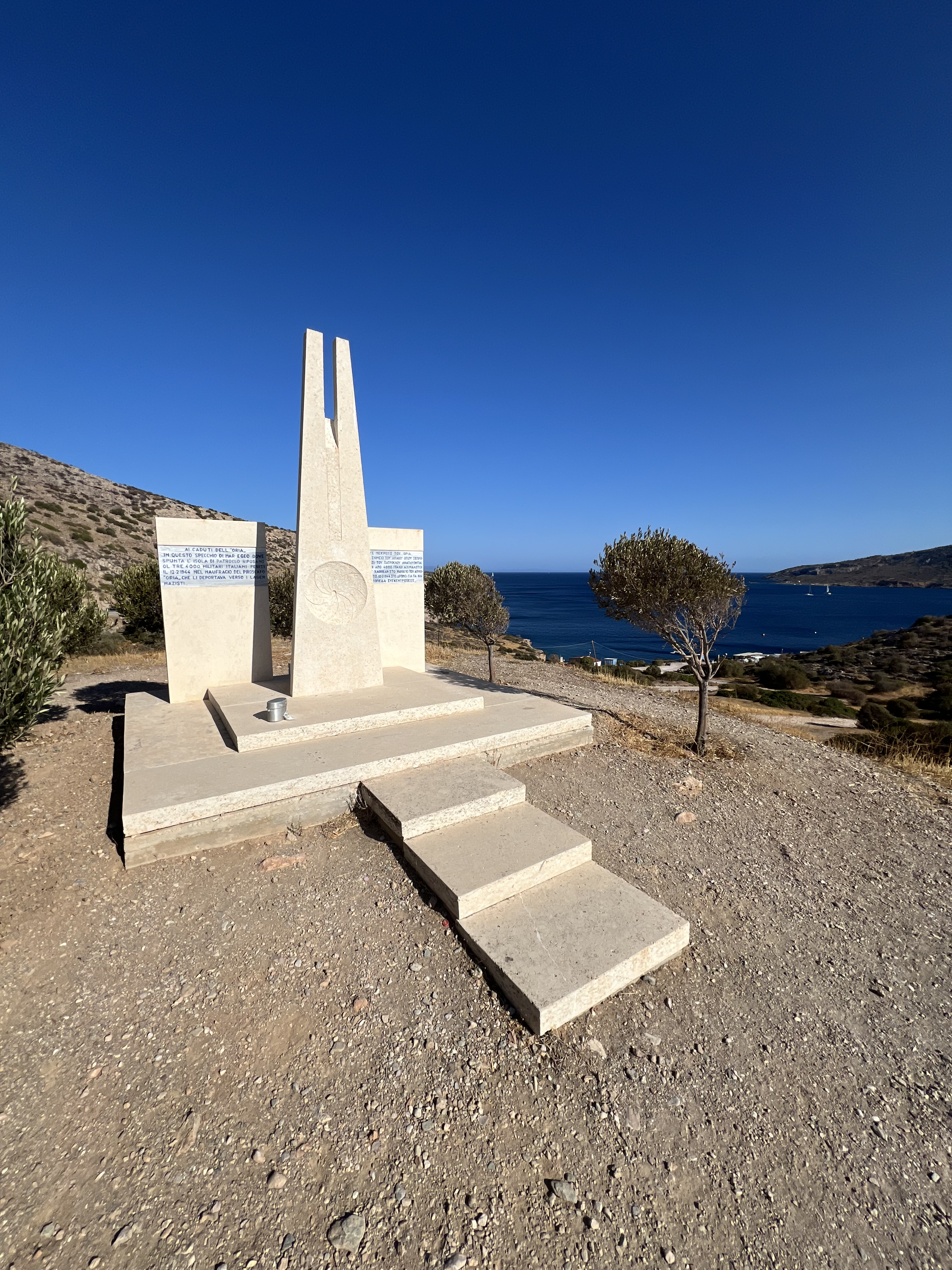
Memorial of the sinking of the SS Oria, near Cape Sounion

Oria was one of the vessels used to carry Italian prisoners. On 11 February 1944, it sailed from Rhodes bound for Piraeus, carrying 4,116 Italian prisoners (43 officers, 118 non-commissioned officers and 3,955 enlisted men), 21 German soldiers (part of whom were tasked with guarding the prisoners, while others were on passage to Greece), and a crew of 22 Greeks. The next day the ship was caught by a storm and sank off Cape Sounion on the South East rocks of Patroklos island. Some tugs, arriving the next day on the scene, could only save 21 Italians, 6 Germans, the Norwegian captain and one Greek. The remains of the wreck were discovered in 1999 by Greek pro diver Aristotelis Zervoudis.

== See also ==
- Battle of Rhodes
- Battle of Kos
- SS Petrella
- Italian military internees
- Italian ship Gaetano Donizetti
- Italian ship Mario Roselli
- Massacre of the Acqui Division
