= Convoy HX 231 =

North Atlantic convoy

Convoy HX.231
- Part of the Second World War
- North Atlantic Ocean map
Date	25 March – 10 April 1943
Location	North Atlantic Ocean

Belligerents
(Nazi Germany) Germany	Canada; United Kingdom

Commanders and leaders
Karl Dönitz	Convoy: Charles Ramsey; Escort: Peter Gretton

Strength
11 U-boats	67 merchant ships; 19 escorts

Casualties and losses
2 U-boats sunk	6 ships sunk

Convoy HX 231 was the 231st of the numbered series of Second World War HX convoys of merchant ships from Halifax, Nova Scotia (HalifaX) to Liverpool. The ships departed New York City on 25 March 1943 and were met on 31 March by Escort Group B 7 of the Mid-Ocean Escort Force. The convoy was found by German U-boats on 4 April and attacked by eleven U-boats from the 1st, 3rd, 6th and 10th U-boat flotillas, from Brest, La Rochelle, St Nazaire and Lorient, respectively. The U-boats formed gruppe Löwenherz (Lionheart) and sank six ships before losing contact on 7 April, for the loss of U-632 and U-635. The convoy reached Liverpool on 10 April.

== Background ==
=== Convoy organisation 1942−1943 ===
In 1942, convoys west of 26° West came under the command of the US Vice-Admiral, Arthur Bristol, along with the escort forces in the western North Atlantic as Task Force 24. The Canadian Western Local Escort Force (WLEF, also Task Group 24.18) was under the tactical command of the Commanding Officer Atlantic Coast, Rear-Admiral Leonard Murray, at Halifax, Nova Scotia, comprising 25 Canadian and 13 British destroyers and corvettes that escorted convoys from Halifax to the Western Ocean Meeting Point (WOMP) at 49° West, when SC convoys began sailing from Halifax.

The Mid-Ocean Escort Force (MOEF) was based at St John's, Newfoundland, Derry in Ireland and Liverpool in Britain and became Task Group 24.1, with seven British, four Canadian and one US Navy escort groups. The MOEF escorted HX, SC, ON and ONS convoys to the Eastern Ocean Meeting Point (EASTOMP) at about 20° West where the convoy was handed over to the Eastern Local Escort groups. Ships to Iceland, the base for Task Group 24.6, with two US escort groups, detached at about 25° West (ICOMP). The mainly old coastguard ships escorting convoys on the Sydney to Greenland leg came under Task Force 24 as Task Group 24.9.

When the US established the Interlocking Convoy System along the east coast and the Caribbean, the northern termination was at New York and from September 1942, transatlantic convoys departed from there. The Western Atlantic escort forces were insufficient for the leg from New York to the WOMP and a new Halifax Ocean Meeting Point (HOMP) was created around 61° West, where the eventual twelve WLEF groups (Task Group 24.18) were relieved. An attempt began in April 1942 to keep the Ocean Escort Groups together, to reap the benefits of teamwork and experience and in the summer of 1942 EASTOMP was moved westwards to accommodate British escorts being sent to the Caribbean. The British escort groups B1 to B7 became based permanently in Britain and the Canadian groups C1 to C4, with the US group A3, at St John's.

West of the Change of Operational Control (CHOP) line, west of 26° west, control of convoys was taken over by the Commander in Chief of the United States Fleet, through the commander of Task force 24, Rear-Admiral M. K. Metcalf from 1 July 1942. To the east of the CHOP line, control transferred to the British Commander-in-Chief, Western Approaches in Liverpool. After the Arctic convoy Convoy RA 53 (1–14 March), the run was suspended for the summer and destroyers on the Arctic run were transferred to Support Groups in the North Atlantic. The 20th Escort Group with eight aged destroyers and Hunt-class destroyers in the 22nd, 23rd and 34th Escort Groups, each of four corvettes, were scheduled for refurbishment. Convoy cycles in the North Atlantic were shortened in March, to accommodate the extra traffic, an HX and a SC convoy departing New York each week, that required 12 ocean escort groups, each of three destroyers, a frigate and six corvettes.

=== The U-boat arm ===
By the spring of 1943, the Ubootwaffe had expanded to the size that the Befehlshaber der U-Boote (BdU, Commander of U-Boats) Rear-Admiral Karl Dönitz had advocated for in 1939. In March, 400 U-boats were in service, 47 were close to completion, 245 were under construction and seven U-boats were being converted. Of the 400 boats, 52 (13 per cent) were training submarines, 119 (29.8 per cent) were working up, seven (1.7 per cent) were prototypes and 222 (55.5 per cent) were operational front-line submarines. Eighteen boats were in the Arctic, 19 in the Mediterranean and three in the Black Sea, leaving 182 for operations in the Atlantic. Of the Atlantic boats, on 1 March 114 (62.6 per cent) were at sea and 68 (37.4 per cent) were in French harbours. Of the U-boats at sea, 44 were in transit (24.2 per cent) and 70 (38.4 per cent) were on patrol in operational areas, 45 in the North Atlantic, 13 in the Central Atlantic, five in the Western Atlantic and seven in the South Atlantic.

== Prelude ==
Convoy HX 231 departed New York on 25 March with 61 merchant ships in an 8 nmi (15 km; 9.2 mi)-wide series of columns but the convoy lost cohesion in fog off the Grand Banks, an underwater plateau to the south-west of Newfoundland. The convoy rendezvoused with Escort Group B7 (Commander Peter Gretton) of the Mid-Ocean Escort Force at the MOMP to the south of Iceland, in the vicinity of 58° North and 35° West. The convoy had been sent northwards into cold and stormy weather. The wind in these high latitudes (closer to the North Pole) comes from the north and west, blowing freezing spray onto decks that has to be chipped off with picks and shovels. On the cargo-liner Shillong, the lifeboats along the port side got so icy that the davits bent and the lifeboats were disconnected and tied to the ship, to float free if the ship sank. Life rafts had been swept away along with the main mast that got so brittle in the cold that it snapped. The captain, J. H. Hollow, had to move out of position in the convoy to jettison the wreckage.

== Allied order of battle ==
=== Merchant ships ===
Merchant ships
Name	Year	Flag	GRT	Notes
Amastra	1935	Merchant Navy	8,031	
Ancylus	1935	Merchant Navy	8,017	
Aruba	1929	Netherlands	3,979	Arrived with rudder damage
MS Asbjörn	1935	Merchant Navy	4,387	
Athelregent	1930	Merchant Navy	8,881	
Athos	1937	Norway	8,267	
Atlantida	1924	Honduras	4,191	
Beaverhill	1928	Merchant Navy	10,041	
Blitar	1923	Netherlands	7,065	Damaged, U-229 sunk 6 April, U-632, 57°45′N, 27°30′W, 26† 54 surv.
British Ardour	1928	Merchant Navy	7,124	Escort oiler, sunk 5 April, U-706, 58°08′N, 33°04′W 0† 54 surv.
British Confidence	1936	Merchant Navy	8,494	
City of Lyons	1926	Merchant Navy	7,063	
Clan Cameron	1937	Merchant Navy	7,243	
Eli Whitney	1942	United States	7,181	
Empire Chief	1897	Merchant Navy	8,040	Tanker
Empire Coleridge	1942	Merchant Navy	9,798	Tanker equipped with Admiralty Defence Nets
Empire Dickens	1942	Merchant Navy	9,819	Tanker
Empire Marvell	1941)	Merchant Navy	9,812	Tanker
Erin	1932	Merchant Navy	5,841	
Esso Dover	1921	United States	8,880	
F J Wolfe	1932	Merchant Navy	12,190	Escort Oiler, turned back with engine trouble
Fort Finlay	1942	Merchant Navy	7,134	
Fort Jemseg	1943	Merchant Navy	7,134	
Fort Thompson	1942	Merchant Navy	7,134	
Geo W McKnight	1933	Merchant Navy	12,502	
Georgian	1920	United States	5,825	
Jamaica Planter	1936	Merchant Navy	4,098	Vice-Convoy Commodore embarked
Joel R Poinsett	1943	United States	7,176	
Katy	1931	Norway	6,826	
Kent	1918	Merchant Navy	8,697	
Lady Rodney	1929	Merchant Navy	8,194	Halifax to St John's, Newfoundland
Laurelwood	1929	Merchant Navy	7,347	
Lochmonar	1924	Merchant Navy	9,412	Returned
Manchester Port	1935	Merchant Navy	5,468	
USS Merak	1932	United States Navy	6,982	Stores and 138 passengers
Mobilgas	1937	United States	9,860	
Mosdale	1939	Norway	3,022	
Nassa	1942	Merchant Navy	8,134	Equipped with Admiralty Defence Nets
Noah Webster	1943	United States	7,176	Turned back
Norheim	1941	Norway	9,816	
Norvinn	1930	Panama	6,322	
Ocean Volunteer	1942	Merchant Navy	7,174	
Ørnefjell	1937	Norway	1,334	Bound for Halifax
Pandorian	1941	Merchant Navy	4,159	
Pierre Soule	1943	United States	7,191	
Pleiades	1939	United States	3,600	
Port Sydney	1914	Merchant Navy	9,129	
Raphael Semmes	1942	United States	6,165	
Reinholt	1939	Norway	4,799	
Salland	1920	Netherlands	6,447	
Saluta	1906	Merchant Navy	6,261	Fuel oil, returned
San Adolfo	1935	Merchant Navy	7,365	
San Ambrosio	1935	Merchant Navy	7,410	
Santa Maria	1942	United States	6,507	
Scebeli	1937	Norway	3,025	Detached and independent, 1 April
Shillong	1939	Merchant Navy	5,529	Damaged, U-635, 57°10′N, 35°30′W, sunk 5 April, U-630, 66† 7 surv.
Slemmestad	1928	Norway	4,258	
Sovac	1937	Merchant Navy	6,724	
Stephen C Foster	1943	United States	7,106	
Sunoil	1927	United States	9,005	Damaged U-563, sunk 5 April, U-530, 58°15′N, 34°14′W, 43† 0 surv
Thomas Sumter	1942	United States	7,177	Romped
Tjibadak	1929	Netherlands	7,083	
Torr Head	1937	Merchant Navy	5,021	
Tulsa	1919	United States	5,083	
Tyndareus	1916	Merchant Navy	11,361	Convoy Commodore, Admiral Sir Charles Ramsey embarked
Vaalaren	1936	Sweden	3,403	Romped 4 April, sunk 5 April, U-229, 58°N, 34°W, 38† 0 surv.
Waroonga	1914	Merchant Navy	9,365	Damaged, U-635, sunk 5 April, U-630, 19†
William Mulholland	1942	United States	7,176	
William Whipple	1942	United States	7,181	

=== Local escorts ===
New York to Western Ocean Meeting Point
Name	Flag	Type	Notes
Western Local Escort Force
HMS Buxton	Royal Navy	Clemson-class destroyer	Escort 27–31 March
HNoMS Narvik	Royal Norwegian Navy	Hunt-class destroyer	Escort 9–10 April
HMCS Chicoutimi	Royal Canadian Navy	Flower-class corvette	Escort 27–31 March
HMCS Quesnel	Royal Canadian Navy	Flower-class corvette	Escort 25–31 March
HMCS Saskatoon	Royal Canadian Navy	Flower-class corvette	Escort 25–28 March
HMCS Kenora	Royal Canadian Navy	Bangor-class minesweeper	Escort 25–28 March
HMCS Milltown	Royal Canadian Navy	Bangor-class minesweeper	Escort 27–31 March
Escort Group B7 (Task Unit 24.1.5)
HMS Ripley	Royal Navy	Clemson-class destroyer	Ex-USS Shubrick, under repair at Liverpool
HMS Duncan	Royal Navy	D-class destroyer	Under repair at Tobermory
HMS Vidette	Royal Navy	V-class destroyer	Escort 31 March – 9 April
HMS Tay	Royal Navy	River-class frigate	Escort 31 March – 9 April
HMS Alisma	Royal Navy	Flower-class corvette	Escort 31 March – 9 April
HMS Loosestrife	Royal Navy	Flower-class corvette	Escort 31 March – 9 April
HMS Pink	Royal Navy	Flower-class corvette	Escort 31 March – 9 April
HMS Snowflake	Royal Navy	Flower-class corvette	Escort 31 March – 9 April
HMS Sunflower	Royal Navy	Flower-class corvette	Under repair at Belfast
4th Support Group
HMS Eclipse	Royal Navy	E-class destroyer	Escort 6–8 April
HMS Fury	Royal Navy	F-class destroyer	Escort 6–8 April
HMS Icarus	Royal Navy	I-class destroyer	Escort 6–8 April
HMS Inglefield	Royal Navy	I-class destroyer	Escort 6–8 April

=== RAF Coastal Command ===
Coastal Command squadrons
Sqn	Flag	Group	Type	Notes
86 Squadron	Royal Air Force	19 Group	Liberator	Very Long Range Anti-submarine warfare aircraft
120 Squadron	Royal Air Force	15 Group	Liberator	Very Long Range Anti-submarine warfare aircraft

== German order of battle ==
=== U-boat group ===
gruppe Löwehnerz
Name	Flag	Class	Notes
Gruppe Löwehnerz
U-168	Kriegsmarine	Type IXC/40 submarine	
U-191	Kriegsmarine	Type IXC/40 submarine	
U-260	Kriegsmarine	Type VIIC submarine	
U-563	Kriegsmarine	Type VIIC submarine	
U-564	Kriegsmarine	Type VIIC submarine	
U-572	Kriegsmarine	Type VIIC submarine	
U-584	Kriegsmarine	Type VIIC submarine	
U-592	Kriegsmarine	Type VIIC submarine	
U-594	Kriegsmarine	Type VIIC submarine	Damaged by Liberator E, 120 Squadron
U-630	Kriegsmarine	Type VIIC submarine	
U-632	Kriegsmarine	Type VIIC submarine	Sunk by Liberator R, 86 Squadron
U-635	Kriegsmarine	Type VIIC submarine	Sunk by Liberator L, 120 Squadron
U-706	Kriegsmarine	Type VIIC submarine	
Other U-boats
U-229	Kriegsmarine	Type VIIC submarine	
U-463	Kriegsmarine	Type XIV submarine	Milchkuh (Milch Cow)
U-532	Kriegsmarine	Type IXC submarine	

== Bibliography ==
- Jordan, Roger W. (2006) [1999]. The World's Merchant Fleets 1939: The Particulars and Wartime Fates of 6,000 Ships (2nd ed.). London: Chatham/Lionel Leventhal. ISBN 978-1-86176-293-1.
- Mitchell, W. H.; Sawyer, L. A. (1990). The Empire Ships (2nd ed.). London, New York, Hamburg, Hong Kong: Lloyd's of London Press Ltd. ISBN 1-85044-275-4.
- Rohwer, Jürgen (1977). The Critical Convoy Battles of March 1943: The Battle for HX.229/SC122. Translated by Masters, Derek (Eng. trans. ed.). London: Ian Allan. ISBN 0-7110-0749-7 – via Archive Foundation. Original title "Geleitzugschlachten im März 1943 : Führungsprobleme im Höhepunkt der Schlacht im Atlantik" (Convoy battles in March 1943: Leadership issues at the height of the Battle of the Atlantic) 1975, Motorbuch Verlag, Stuttgart ISBN 978-3-87-943383-4
- Rohwer, Jürgen; Hümmelchen, Gerhard (2005) [1972]. Chronology of the War at Sea, 1939–1945: The Naval History of World War Two (3rd rev. ed.). London: Chatham. ISBN 978-1-86176-257-3.
- Woodman, Richard (2004). The Real Cruel Sea: The Merchant Navy in the Battle of the Atlantic 1939–1943. London: John Murray. ISBN 0-7195-6403-4.
