= SS Gaetano Donizetti =

Ex-Italian merchant motorship

The SS Gaetano Donizetti was an ex-Italian merchant motorship, captured by Nazi Germany for war use then destroyed by HMS Eclipse on 23 September 23, 1943 in the eastern Aegean Sea, taking to the bottom its munitions and killing 1,800 people on board: 1,576 Italian prisoners of war significantly overcrowded aboard, 220 German guards, and a small crew.

== Background ==
On September 8, 1943 the Armitice of Cassibile was signed. The Germans expected the Italian surrender, and immediately launched Operation Achse to disarm the Italian Army and take over their annexed lands. The Dodecanese islands had been Italian-occupied since the Italo-Turkish War of 1912. German forces under Generalleutnant Ulrich Kleemann rushed to the central island of Rhodes, and in the Battle of Rhodes attacked the 40,000-strong Italian garrison on 9 September, and forced it to surrender by 11 September. In doing so, they outmaneuvered the British, which had hoped by their Dodecanese Campaign to control the islands as bases against the German-controlled Balkans. The Germans had to hold off the British and wanted to get rid of the numerous Italian prisoners as soon as possible. The Nazis deemed the Italians who chose not to fight further alongside them (the majority), not as prisoners of war, but as traitors to be sent to Germany. These Italian military internees faced forced labor.

== The disaster ==
The Italian motor vessel Gaetano Donizetti of 3,428 tons, had been confiscated by the Germans to bring arms to Rhodes, where she arrived on 19 September. The Germans then stowed some 1,600 prisoners in the cargo hold, where there was reasonably only room for 700.
The Gaetano Donizetti set sail on September 22. It sailed along the east coast of Rhodes, and headed southwest, passing Lindos to the south. The Gaetano Donizetti was escorted by the German torpedo boat TA10 (Oberleutnant Jobst Hahndorff). This was the former French torpedo boat La Pomone and later the Italian FR 42.

Around 1:10 a.m. of September 23, the convoy was detected by HMS Eclipse (Commander E. Mack), who immediately opened fire. The overcrowded Gaetano Donizetti went down in seconds, taking with her the German crew and all Italian prisoners. The German torpedo boat TA10 was severely damaged and later towed back to Rhodes, where it was scuttled a few days later. Eclipse left the scene, not realising the extent of the tragedy that had just happened.

Almost all sources agreed that Gaetano Donizetti sank with all hands, though there is an Italian report claiming that at least 32 survivors were rescued by a British destroyer. No official British records confirm this story.

On February 12, 1944, another transport ship leaving Rhodes, Oria, sank in a storm, causing the death of some 4,000 Italian prisoners of war.

== Sources ==
- Wrecksite, Gaetano Donizetti (+1943)
- Le grandi tragedie de Egeo (in Italian)
- Chronik des Seekrieges 1939–1945, Württembergische Landesbibliothek, (in German) entry in September 1943
