= SS Blitar =

Dutch cargo steamship, 1922-43

Coordinates: 57°45′N 27°30′W

History

Netherlands
- Name: Blitar
- Namesake: Blitar, Dutch East Indies
- Owner: Koninklijke Rotterdamsche Lloyd
- Operator: Willem Ruys & Zonen
- Port of registry: Rotterdam
- Builder: Maatschappij Fijenoord, Rotterdam
- Yard number: 286
- Launched: 20 September 1922
- Completed: 10 July 1923
- Identification: code letters NHBQ (until 1933); call sign PDDS (from 1934)
- Fate: Sunk by torpedo, 6 April 1943

General characteristics
- Type: Cargo ship
- Tonnage: 7,073 GRT, 4,451 NRT, 9,910 DWT
- Length: 446.2 ft (136.0 m)
- Beam: 54.3 ft (16.6 m)
- Depth: 34.2 ft (10.4 m)
- Decks: 3
- Installed power: 436 NHP
- Propulsion: as built: triple-expansion steam engine; from 1931: as above plus exhaust steam turbine
- Speed: 12.5 knots (23 km/h)
- Capacity: grain: 523,000 cubic feet (14,800 m^{3}); bale: 446,000 cubic feet (12,600 m^{3})
- Crew: 72 crew + 8 DEMS gunners
- Sensors & processing systems: wireless direction finding
- Armament: (as DEMS): 1 × 4 in (100 mm) gun; 2 × Oerlikon 20 mm cannon; 3 × machine guns
- Notes: sister ships: Palembang, Soekaboemi, Tapanoeli

SS Blitar was a Dutch cargo steamship that was launched in Rotterdam in 1922 and sunk in the Battle of the Atlantic in 1943. She is notable for having fought off three u-boats in succession for nearly ten hours before U-632 finally managed to sink her. 26 of Blitar's complement were killed.

== Building ==
In 1921 Bonn & Mees in Rotterdam built the cargo steamship Palembang for the shipping line Koninklijke Rotterdamsche Lloyd (RL). In 1922–23 Maatschappij Fijenoord in Rotterdam built the sister ship Blitar for RL.

Blitar was launched on 20 September 1922 and completed on 10 July 1923. Her registered length was 446.2 ft (136.0 m), her beam was 54.3 ft (16.6 m) and her depth was 34.2 ft (10.4 m). Her tonnages were 7,073 GRT, 4,451 NRT and 9,910 DWT. Blitar, like Palembang, had a three-cylinder triple-expansion steam engine driving a single screw.

Also in 1923 Bonn & Mees built Soekaboemi and in 1924 NV Scheepsbouw "De Maas" in Slikkerveer built Tapanoeli for RL. They had the same dimensions as Palembang and Blitar, but were steam turbine ships.

== Peacetime career ==
RL registered Blitar in Rotterdam. In 1931 the P. Smit Jr. shipyard in Rotterdam added a Brown, Boveri & Cie low-pressure steam turbine to her machinery to increase her fuel efficiency and power. Steam from the low-pressure cylinder of her triple-expansion engine powered the turbine, and both engines drove the same propeller shaft. Together the reciprocating engine and turbine gave Blitar a speed of 12.5 knots (23 km/h) or 13 knots (24 km/h).

Blitar's code letters were NHBQ until 1933–34, when the call sign PDDS superseded them. By 1938 her navigation equipment included wireless direction finding.

== Second World War ==
On 10 May 1940 Germany invaded the Netherlands, and the next day Blitar took refuge in Gibraltar. By 17 May German forces had overrun the Netherlands, and on 28 May Blitar left Gibraltar in Convoy HG 32F, which reached Liverpool on 6 June. For the next 33 months Blitar sailed to ports in the Indian Ocean, Dutch East Indies, Caribbean, New Zealand, Middle East, Portuguese East Africa, Argentina and Brazil. In 1942 she passed through the Panama Canal in January and the Suez Canal in August.

On 9 February 1943 Blitar left Buenos Aires for Liverpool carrying a general cargo that included cowhide, fertilizer and food. She called at Montevideo, Pernambuco and Recife, where she joined Convoy BT 5 to Trinidad. From there Convoy TAG 47 took her to Guantánamo Bay, whence Convoy GN 47 took her to New York, where she arrived on 23 March.

=== Convoy HX 231 ===
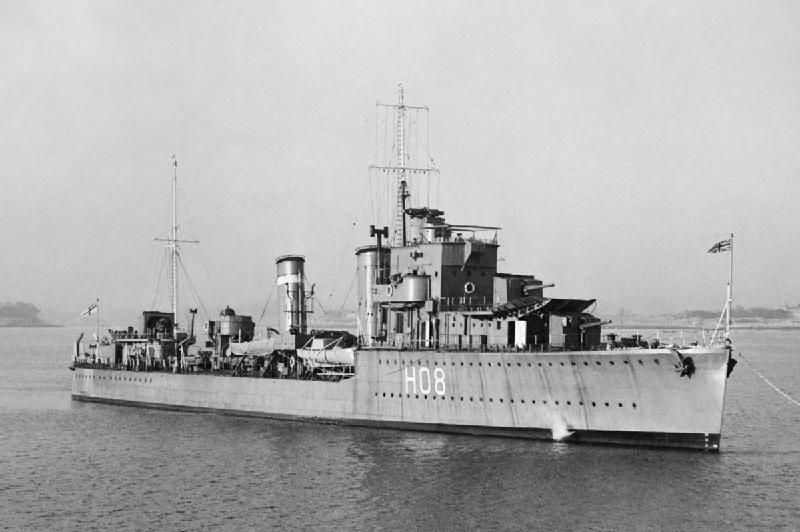
HMS Eclipse was one of HX 231's escorts, and rescued of Blitar's survivors

On 25 March 1943 Blitar left New York with Convoy HX 231, which comprised 67 merchant ships and 19 naval escorts. Blitar had a complement of 80 men: 46 Dutch officers, stewards and ratings, 23 Chinese stokers, eight UK DEMS gunners, one Chinese steward and one UK ordinary seaman. Her armament was one 4 in (100 mm) naval gun on her poop deck, plus two anti-aircraft Oerlikon 20 mm cannon and three machine guns.

At 0158 hrs 5 April a wolf pack of 11 u-boats from four flotillas attacked HX 231. Blitar's Master, Captain WE Knip, decided to take Blitar out of the convoy and make for the UK independently. The Swedish refrigerated motor ship Vaalaren and US Liberty ship Thomas Sumter. At 0509 hrs German submarine U-229 sank Vaalaren. U-229 saw the Swedish crew launch a lifeboat, but it was never found and no-one survived.

At 1455 hrs U-229 caught up with Blitar and fired a torpedo at her, but Blitar was zig-zagging and the torpedo missed. Unable to keep up with Blitar while submerged, U-229 surfaced and opened fire with her 88mm deck gun. Blitar's British DEMS gunners returned fire. Shells from both vessels fell short, and after six rounds U-229's gun jammed with a shellcase in the breech, so she broke off her attack. U-229 was also low on fuel, so she left to find a supply submarine.

At 1555 hrs U-632 sighted Blitar and gave chase. About four hours later German submarine U-631 joined the chase. At 2239 hrs U-632 fired two torpedoes, but both missed. At 0003 hrs on 6 April U-631 fired two torpedoes, which also missed. U-632 fired two more torpedoes at 0010 hrs, but missed again. Finally at 0136 hrs U-632 hit Blitar with one torpedo in the starboard side of her engine room, killing 21 of her crew.

The explosion destroyed Blitar's starboard lifeboats and disabled her wireless. Her surviving crew launched her three port boats. After they had abandoned ship, U-632 hit Blitar with a second torpedo in her number three hold, and then a third torpedo in her bow. She sank about 30 minutes after the first torpedo hit her.

U-631 approached the lifeboats to question the survivors. There was too much of a swell for a lifeboat to get alongside the u-boat, so U-631's commander demanded that a survivor swim to the u-boat for questioning. Captain Knip volunteered, and having discarded his uniform managed to convince his captors that he was an ordinary seaman. He disclosed Blitar's cargo but not her name or destination. U-631's commander decided not to keep him prisoner, and sent Knip to swim back to his lifeboat, but he drowned, possibly due to exhaustion.

This left Blitar's Chief Officer, PW de Haan, commanding lifeboat number 2 with 27 occupants, lifeboat number 4 carrying 15 occupants and the Second Officer, JJ Schreuder, commanding lifeboat number 6 with 16 occupants. Overnight four men in boat number 2 died and were buried at sea.

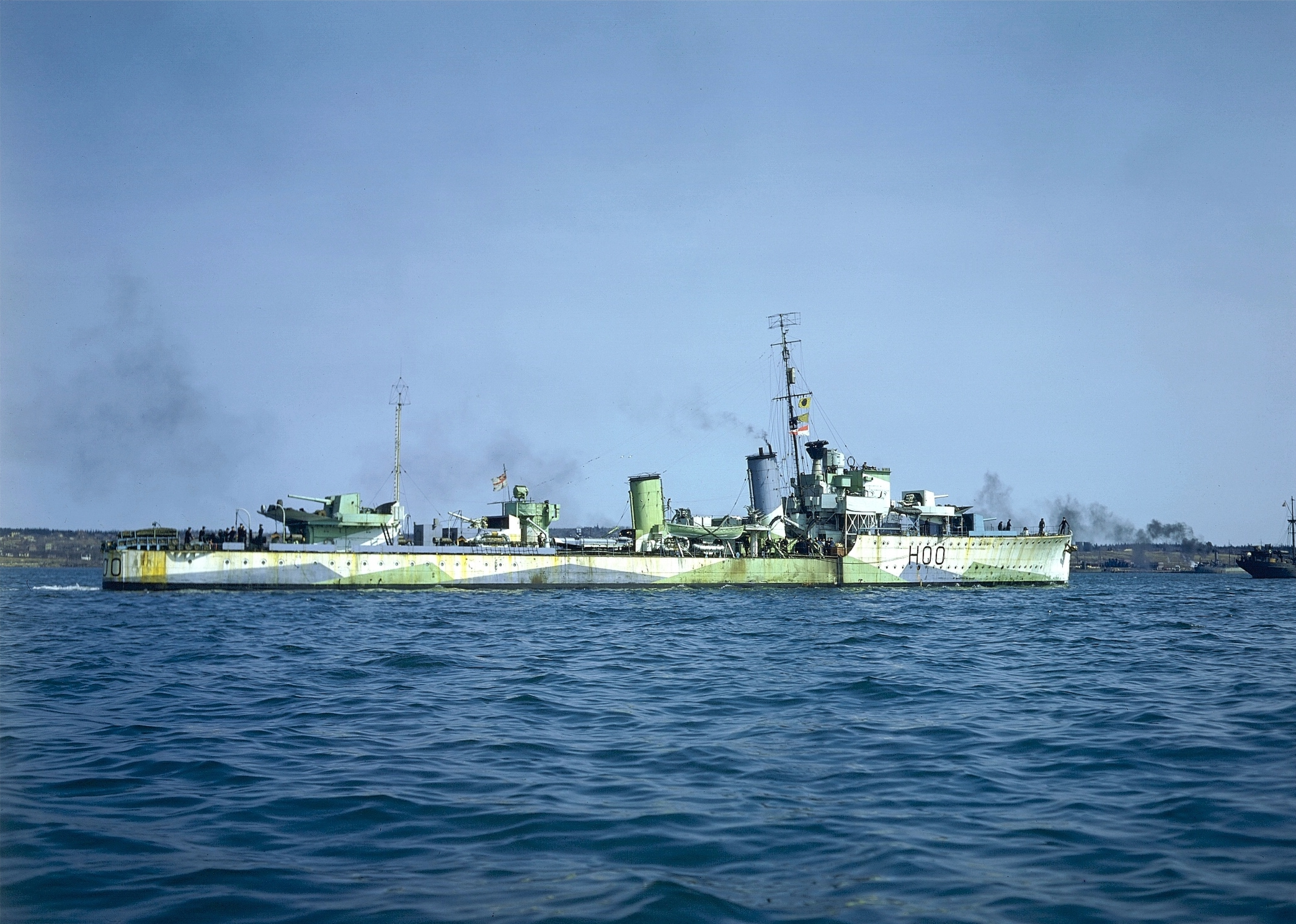
HMCS Restigouche rescued 23 of Blitar's survivors

Boats 2 and 4 kept together and set sail for Ireland. On 7 April a patrol aircraft saw the two boats and dropped three packages of provisions. On 10 April the boats sighted escorts of Convoy ON 177 and fired distress flares. At 0830 hrs the Royal Canadian Navy destroyer HMCS Restigouche rescued 23 survivors from number 2 boat and two hours later the frigate HMS Trent rescued 15 survivors from number 6 boat.

Boat 6 lost contact with boats 2 and 4, but Second Officer Schreuder also set course for Ireland. On 8 April a Short Sunderland flying boat sighted boat 6, dropped provisions and directed the destroyer HMS Eclipse from Convoy HX 231 to the boat. Eclipse reached the boat at dawn on 9 April and landed its survivors at Reykjavík on 10 April.
