= HMS Eclipse (H08) =

E-class destroyer of the Royal Navy, in service from 1934 to 1943

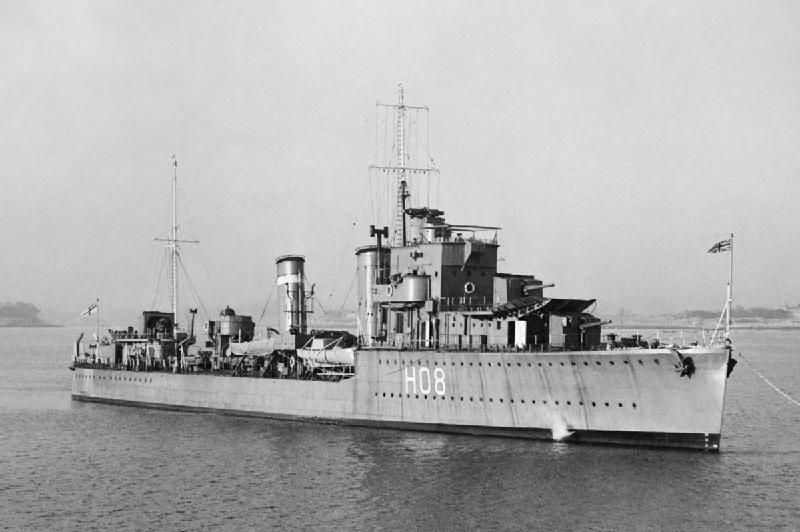
- Eclipse, 1935

History

United Kingdom
- Name: Eclipse
- Namesake: Eclipse
- Ordered: 1 November 1932
- Builder: William Denny and Brothers, Dumbarton
- Laid down: 22 March 1933
- Launched: 12 April 1934
- Completed: 29 November 1934
- Identification: Pennant number: H08
- Motto: Nunquan; ("Never eclipsed")
- Fate: Sunk by a mine, 24 October 1943
- Badge: On a Field Blue, the Earth Black over a sun Gold.

General characteristics (as built)
- Class & type: E-class destroyer
- Displacement: 1,405 long tons (1,428 t) (standard)
- Length: 329 ft (100.3 m) o/a
- Beam: 33 ft 3 in (10.13 m)
- Draught: 12 ft 6 in (3.81 m) (deep)
- Installed power: 3 × Admiralty 3-drum boilers; 36,000 shp (27,000 kW)
- Propulsion: 2 × shafts; 2 × geared steam turbines
- Speed: 35.5 knots (65.7 km/h; 40.9 mph)
- Range: 6,350 nmi (11,760 km; 7,310 mi) at 15 knots (28 km/h; 17 mph)
- Complement: 145
- Sensors & processing systems: ASDIC
- Armament: 4 × single 4.7 in (120 mm) guns; 2 × quadruple 0.5 in (12.7 mm) machine guns; 2 × quadruple 21 in (533 mm) torpedo tubes; 1 × depth charge rack and 2 throwers for 20 depth charges

HMS Eclipse was an E-class destroyer of the Royal Navy that saw service in the Atlantic, Arctic, and Mediterranean theatres during World War II, until sunk by a mine in the Aegean Sea on 24 October 1943.

== Description ==
The E-class ships were slightly improved versions of the preceding D class. They displaced 1,405 long tons (1,428 t) at standard load and 1,940 long tons (1,970 t) at deep load. The ships had an overall length of 329 feet (100.3 m), a beam of 33 feet 3 inches (10.1 m) and a draught of 12 feet 6 inches (3.8 m). They were powered by two Parsons geared steam turbines, each driving one propeller shaft using steam provided by three Admiralty three-drum boilers. The turbines developed a total of 36,000 shaft horsepower (27,000 kW) and gave a maximum speed of 35.5 knots (65.7 km/h; 40.9 mph). Eclipse carried a maximum of 470 long tons (480 t) of fuel oil that gave her a range of 6,350 nautical miles (11,760 km; 7,310 mi) at 15 knots (28 km/h; 17 mph). The ships' complement was 145 officers and ratings.

The ships mounted four 45-calibre 4.7-inch (120 mm) Mark IX guns in single mounts. For anti-aircraft (AA) defence, they had two quadruple Mark I mounts for the 0.5 inch Vickers Mark III machine gun. The E class was fitted with two above-water quadruple torpedo tube mounts for 21-inch (533 mm) torpedoes. One depth charge rail and two throwers were fitted; 20 depth charges were originally carried, but this increased to 35 shortly after the war began.

== Construction and career ==
Eclipse, the eighth ship of that name to serve with the Royal Navy, was ordered 1 November 1932, from Denny under the 1931 Naval Programme. She was laid down on 22 March 1933 at their Dumbarton dockyard, and launched on 12 April 1934. The ship was commissioned on 29 November 1934, at a total cost of £246, 664, excluding government-furnished equipment like the armament.

Assigned to the 5th Destroyer Flotilla of the Home Fleet with her sister ships, Eclipse served around the British Isles for the next several months, departing Plymouth on 31 August 1935 for the Mediterranean Fleet with most of the rest of the flotilla during the Abyssinia Crisis. The destroyer was based at Haifa from 8 September to 3 October, Alexandria from 4 October to 5 January 1936, and at several bases in the Eastern Mediterranean until her departure from the region in March. She was refitted from 20 March to 30 April at Devonport after returning to the British Isles.

=== Operation Menace ===
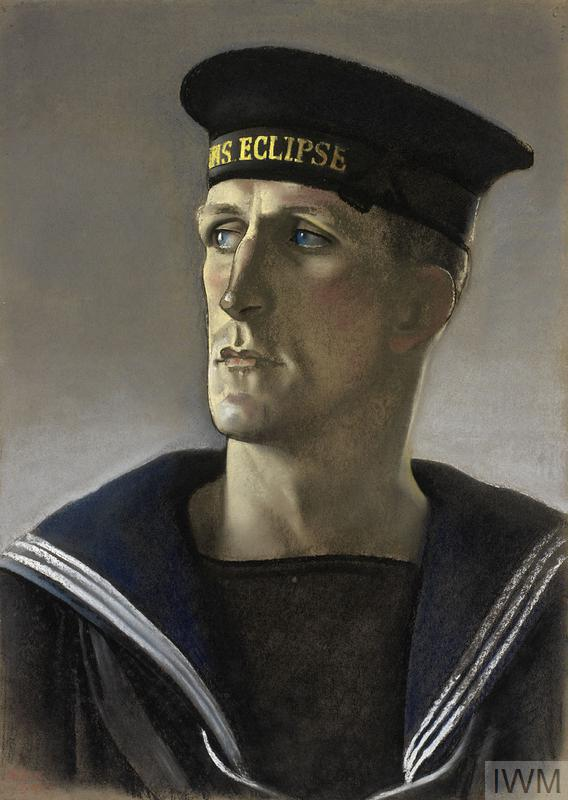
Leading Seaman Walker of HMS Eclipse, by Eric Kennington

In autumn 1940, Eclipse was deployed as part of the protective screen for troopships sailing to West Africa in Operation Menace (for proposed landings at Dakar, later abandoned). She returned home to join the 3rd Destroyer Flotilla after repairs—first at Freetown, Sierra Leone, and subsequently at Gibraltar. In this period, one member of her crew was Charles Causley, the Cornish poet and broadcaster. He subsequently published two poems about the ship and this voyage: 'HMS Eclipse Approaches Freetown'; and 'Immunity', which recounts an inoculation session, and then anticipates the ship's loss later in the war.

From 12 April 1941 Eclipse was refitted at Devonport Dockyard, sailing in early June to rejoin the 3rd Destroyer Flotilla. On 25 June she was deployed to protect the ships of the 1st Minelaying Squadron during a minelay in the Northern Barrage, replacing the destroyer HMS Brighton, which had been damaged in a collision with the cruiser Kenya. At the end of July she was part of the destroyer screen of Force P—the carriers Furious and Victorious, and the cruisers Devonshire and Suffolk—during the raid on Kirkenes and Petsamo (Operation EF).

=== Operation Gauntlet ===
In mid-August Eclipse and five other destroyers were deployed as the screen for the cruisers Aurora and Nigeria, as they escorted the troopship Empress of Canada and the auxiliary tanker Oligarch to Spitsbergen in Operation Gauntlet. Canadian troops landed to destroy mining equipment and two radio stations, while Norwegian and Russian civilians were evacuated.

=== Operation Gearbox ===
Eclipse remained on screening duty from June to August, transferring to the 8th Destroyer Flotilla in July. In September she was deployed with the destroyers HMS Amazon, Bulldog, Echo and Venomous as the screen for the cruisers HMS Cumberland and Sheffield to establish a refuelling facility at Lowe Sound, Spitsbergen, and re-supply the garrison there (Operation Gearbox).

She then refitted at a shipyard on the Humber before rejoining the Flotilla at Scapa Flow on 20 November.

=== Convoy HX 231 ===
In April 1943 Eclipse was one of the escorts of Convoy HX 231, which was attacked by 11 U-boats from four flotillas. Eclipse rescued 16 survivors from the Dutch cargo ship Blitar on 9 April, and landed them at Reykjavík the next day.

=== Sinking of Gaetano Donizetti ===
The Italian freighter Gaetano Donizetti of 3,428 tons, had been seized by the Germans to bring arms to Rhodes. The Germans stowed some 1,600 prisoners in the cargo hold and Gaetano Donizetti set sail on 22 September 1943. The vessel sailed along the east coast of Rhodes, and headed south-west, passing Lindos to the south. The Italian ship was escorted by the German torpedo boat TA10 under Oberleutnant Jobst Hahndorff. This was the former French torpedo boat La Pomone and later the Italian FR 42.

Around 01:10 that night (on 23 September), the convoy was detected by Eclipse under Commander E. Mack, who immediately opened fire. Gaetano Donizetti sank in seconds, taking with her the entire German crew, German guards and all the Italian prisoners of war. TA10 was heavily damaged and later towed back to Rhodes, where it was scuttled a few days later.

On 24 October 1943 Eclipse hit a mine east off Kalymnos in position 37°01′N 27°11′E. She broke in two and sank within five minutes with the loss of 119 of the ship's company and 134 soldiers (from A Company, 4th Battalion, Buffs (Royal East Kent Regiment)).

== Bibliography ==
- Colledge, J. J.; Warlow, Ben (2006) [1969]. Ships of the Royal Navy: The Complete Record of All Fighting Ships of the Royal Navy from the 15th Century to the Present (3rd Rev ed.). London: Chatham Publishing. ISBN 978-1-86176-281-8. OCLC 67375475.
- English, John (1993). Amazon to Ivanhoe: British Standard Destroyers of the 1930s. Kendal, England: World Ship Society. ISBN 0-905617-64-9.
- Friedman, Norman (2006). British Destroyers & Frigates: The Second World War and After. Annapolis, Maryland: Naval Institute Press. ISBN 1-86176-137-6.
- Lenton, H. T. (1998). British & Empire Warships of the Second World War. Annapolis, Maryland: Naval Institute Press. ISBN 1-55750-048-7.
- Rohwer, Jürgen (2005). Chronology of the War at Sea 1939–1945: The Naval History of World War Two (Third Revised ed.). Annapolis, Maryland: Naval Institute Press. ISBN 1-59114-119-2.
- Whitley, M. J. (1988). Destroyers of World War Two: An International Encyclopedia. Annapolis, Maryland: Naval Institute Press. ISBN 0-87021-326-1.
- Christopher Shores, Brian Cull and Nicola Malizia (1987). Air War for Yugoslavia, Greece, and Crete. London: Grub Street. ISBN 0-948817-07-0.
