= David Sutherland (British Army officer) =

British Army officer

- Born: 28 October 1920; Peebles, Scotland
- Died: 14 March 2006 (aged 85)
- Allegiance: United Kingdom
- Branch: British Army
- Service years: 1939–1977
- Rank: Colonel
- Commands: 21 SAS (TA) Regiment
- Conflicts: Second World War; Cold War
- Awards: Commander of the Order of the British Empire, Military Cross and Bar, Efficiency Decoration, Greek War Cross, Mentioned in Dispatches

Colonel David George Carr Sutherland CBE, MC*, TD, DL (28 October 1920 – 14 March 2006) was a British Army officer, intelligence officer and military author.

Sutherland was educated at Eton College and the Royal Military College, Sandhurst. On 22 October 1939 he commissioned into the 6th Battalion, Black Watch and went to France as part of the British Expeditionary Force. He saw action in the Battle of France. In 1940 he joined No. 8 (Guards) Commando in the Middle East and participated in Operation Flipper. In 1941 Sutherland served with the 1 Special Boat Service before serving with 1 Special Air Service (D Squadron) in the Western Desert between 1942 and 1943. On 16 November 1942 he was awarded the Military Cross for his part in Operation Anglo; he received a Bar in September 1943. From 1943 to 1945 he was commanding officer of S Detachment of the Special Boat Squadron operating in Palestine, the Greek islands, Albania, and Yugoslavia. He was mentioned in dispatches in January 1945 for "gallant & distinguished services against the enemy in the field."

Following the end of the Second World War, Sutherland was on the British military mission to Greece in 1946 (being awarded the Greek War Cross), before becoming an instructor at Sandhurst. He worked for MI5 throughout the period, in which he was appointed to advise on the security of the Kariba dam and oil installations in the Gulf before he was made head of station in Pakistan. Between 1956 and 1958 was commanding officer of 21 SAS Regiment. Sutherland served as deputy commander SAS Group from 1967 to 1972. In June 1974 he was invested as a Commander of the Order of the British Empire and retired as a colonel in 1977.

Sutherland served as deputy lieutenant for his home town of Peebles in 1974. He married twice and had one son and two daughters.

== Publications ==
- He Who Dares: Recollections of Service in the SAS, SBS and MI5 (1998)
