= HMS Traveller (N48) =

Submarine of the Royal Navy

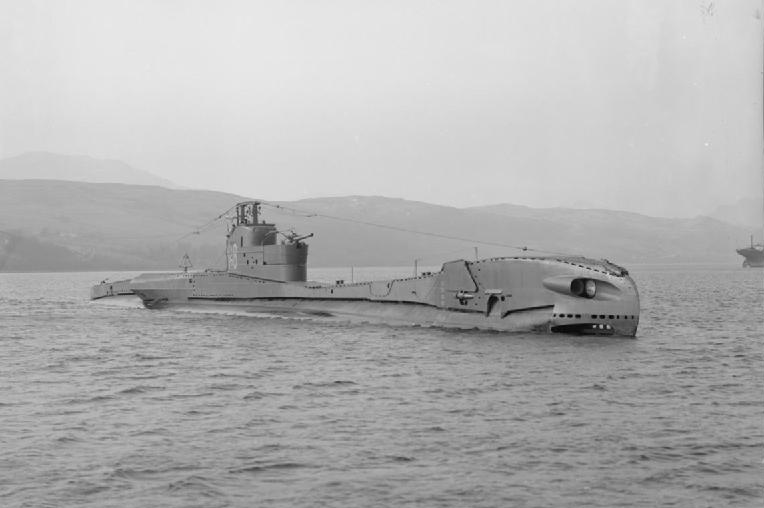
- HMS Traveller in the Gareloch (southwest Scotland), in April 1942

History

United Kingdom
- Name: HMS Traveller
- Builder: Scotts, Greenock
- Laid down: 17 January 1940
- Launched: 27 August 1941
- Commissioned: 10 April 1942
- Identification: Pennant number N48
- Fate: Sunk on 4 December 1942
- Badge

General characteristics
- Class & type: British T class submarine
- Displacement: 1,090 tons surfaced; 1,575 tons submerged
- Length: 275 ft (84 m)
- Beam: 26 ft 6 in (8.08 m)
- Draught: 16.3 ft (5.0 m)
- Propulsion: Two shafts; Twin diesel engines 2,500 hp (1.86 MW) each; Twin electric motors 1,450 hp (1.08 MW) each
- Speed: 15.25 knots (28.7 km/h) surfaced; Nine knots (20 km/h) submerged
- Range: 4,500 nautical miles at 11 knots (8,330 km at 20 km/h) surfaced
- Test depth: 300 ft (91 m) max
- Complement: 61
- Armament: Six internal forward-facing 21-inch (533 mm) torpedo tubes; Two external forward-facing torpedo tubes; Three external backward-facing torpedo tubes; Six reload torpedoes; 1 x 4-inch (102 mm) deck gun; Three anti-aircraft machine guns

HMS Traveller (N48) was a T-class submarine of the Royal Navy. She was laid down by Scotts, Greenock and launched in August 1941.

== Career ==
Traveller spent most of her career serving in the Mediterranean. She was unsuccessful in most of her attacks, sinking the Italian merchantman Albachiara, but launching failed attacks against the Italian merchant ship Ezilda Croce, the Italian 'small light cruiser' Cattaro (the former Yugoslavian Dalmacija), the Italian tanker Proserpina (the former French Beauce) and the Italian torpedo boats Castore and Ciclone. She also claimed to have attacked two so far unidentified submarines.

Officers of HMS Traveller, 30 October 1942. On the left is Lt Michael Beauchamp St John (1915–2009), who was taken ill and not on board when the submarine sunk. On the right is Lt John Russel Wild, who died on board at the age of 21.

Traveller left Malta on 28 November 1942 for a patrol in the Gulf of Taranto. She carried out a reconnaissance of Taranto harbour for a Chariot human torpedo attack (Operation Principal). The submarine did not return from the operation and was reported overdue on 12 December. She probably struck an Italian mine on or about 4 December. All 65 crew members died in this unit. Lt Cdr St Clair-Ford was the commanding officer of HMS Parthian but was standing in for the captain of HMS Traveller (Lt Michael Beauchamp St John) who had been taken ill.

During the war, Traveller was adopted by the Borough of Leyton in London as part of Warship Week. The plaque from this adoption is held by the National Museum of the Royal Navy in Portsmouth.

== Publications ==
- Caruana, Joseph (2012). "Emergency Victualling of Malta During WWII". Warship International. LXIX (4): 357–364. ISSN 0043-0374.
- Colledge, J. J.; Warlow, Ben (2006) [1969]. Ships of the Royal Navy: The Complete Record of All Fighting Ships of the Royal Navy from the 15th Century to the Present (3rd Rev ed.). London: Chatham Publishing. ISBN 978-1-86176-281-8. OCLC 67375475.
- Hutchinson, Robert (2001). Jane's Submarines: War Beneath the Waves from 1776 to the Present Day. London: HarperCollins. ISBN 978-0-00-710558-8. OCLC 53783010.
