= List of shipwrecks in October 1943 =

The list of shipwrecks in October 1943 includes ships sunk, foundered, grounded, or otherwise lost during October 1943.

== 1 October ==
List of shipwrecks: 1 October 1943
Ship	State	Description
Empire Commerce	United Kingdom	World War II: Convoy MKS 26: The tanker (3,722 GRT) was torpedoed in the Mediterranean Sea off Philippeville, Algeria (37°19′N 6°40′E) by U-410 (Kriegsmarine). Her stern section sank but her bow section remained afloat. After attempts to scuttle it failed, the bow was towed to shore and beached at Algiers but was gutted by fire. All 51 people aboard were rescued by HMS Alisma (Royal Navy).
Euro	Regia Marina	World War II: The Turbine-class destroyer was bombed and sunk by German aircraft off Leros, Greece. Nine crew were killed or reported missing, and seven more died the next month when the island was retaken by the Germans.
Fort Howe	United Kingdom	World War II: Convoy MKS 26: The Fort ship (7,133 GRT) was torpedoed and sunk in the Mediterranean Sea (37°19′N 6°40′E) by U-410 (Kriegsmarine) with the loss of two gunners of her 70 crew. Survivors were rescued by HMS Alisma and HMS Spirea (both Royal Navy).
I-20	Imperial Japanese Navy	World War II: The Type C submarine was shelled and sunk in the Pacific Ocean off Vella Lavella, Solomon Islands 7°40′N 157°10′E by USS Eaton (United States Navy).
Kinkasan Maru	Imperial Japanese Army	World War II: Convoy SO-805: The Kinkasan Maru-class auxiliary transport ship was torpedoed and sunk in the Pacific Ocean 746 miles (1,201 km) east south east of Palau (04°00′N 143°50′E) by USS Peto (United States Navy). Three crew were killed.
USS LCT 496	United States Navy	World War II: The LCT-1-class landing craft tank was shelled and sunk in the English Channel.
HMS LCT 553	Royal Navy	The Mk 4 landing craft tank (350/640 t, 1942) was lost in the Mediterranean Sea.
Metapan	United States	World War II: Convoy UGS 15: The cargo ship (4,736 GRT) was sunk by a mine in the Mediterranean Sea north east of Tunis, Tunisia (37°20′N 10°35′E). The 74 people aboard were rescued by USS Syncline (United States Navy).
USS PT-68	United States Navy	World War II: The Elco 77-foot PT boat ran aground off Vincke Point, Huon Peninsula, New Guinea (05°56′S 147°18′E) and was scuttled. The whole crew was rescued by PT-391 (United States Navy).
R 205	Kriegsmarine	World War II: The minesweeper struck a mine and sank in the Irben Strait.
Sergei Kirov	Soviet Union	World War II: Convoy VA 18: The cargo ship was torpedoed and sunk in the Kara Sea 12 nautical miles (22 km) south east of Izvestij Island (75°48′N 83°52′E) by U-703 (Kriegsmarine) with the loss of one of her 54 crew. Survivors were rescued by T-909 (Soviet Navy).
Storviken	Norway	World War II: The cargo ship (4,836 GRT, 1917) was torpedoed and sunk in the Indian Ocean (11°45′N 48°07′E) by I-10 (Imperial Japanese Navy) with the loss of 37 of her 56 crew. Some of the survivors were rescued by HMS Sennen (Royal Navy), others reached land. Two were taken as prisoners of war.
T-896	Soviet Navy	World War II: Convoy VA 18: The auxiliary minesweeper was torpedoed and sunk in the Kara Sea (75°28′N 83°25′E) by U-960 (Kriegsmarine) with the loss of all 43 crew.
Tahsinia	United Kingdom	World War II: The cargo ship (7,267 GRT, 1942) was torpedoed, shelled and sunk in the Laccadive Sea north east of the Maldive Islands (6°51′N 74°38′E) by U-532 (Kriegsmarine). All 48 crew were rescued by Nevasa (United Kingdom) or reached land in their lifeboats.
Tonei Maru	Imperial Japanese Navy	World War II: Convoy SO-805: The Tonei Maru-class auxiliary collier/oiler was torpedoed and sunk in the Pacific Ocean 746 miles (1,201 km) east south east of Palau (04°00′N 143°50′E) by USS Peto (United States Navy). Ten crew were killed.
USS YDG-4	United States Navy	The degaussing vessel ran aground and sank in Bulari Passage, a break in the reefs on the approach to Nouméa, New Caledonia.

== 2 October ==
List of shipwrecks: 2 October 1943
Ship	State	Description
F 302	Kriegsmarine	World War II: The Type A Marinefahrprahm was sunk by a mine off Cape Takil, Black Sea (45°21′N 36°29′E). There were five dead and four wounded.
F 315	Kriegsmarine	World War II: The Type A Marinefahrprahm was damaged by a mine off Cape Takil, Black Sea (45°21′N 36°29′E) and scuttled by RA-56 (Kriegsmarine) to prevent capture. There were one dead and 12 wounded.
Fuku Maru	Japan	World War II: The cargo ship was damaged in an air attack at Rabaul, New Guinea and beached in Simpson Harbor. Scrapped in place in 1958.
Haiching	United Kingdom	World War II: The cargo ship (2,183 GRT, 1898) was torpedoed and sunk in the Arabian Sea 80 nautical miles (150 km; 92 mi) west south west of Bombay, India (18°46′N 71°55′E) by U-168 (Kriegsmarine) with the loss of 12 of her 70 crew. Survivors were rescued by the dhow Mahadro Prasad (India).
HMS LCT 618	Royal Navy	The LCT-4-class landing craft tank (350/640 t, 1942) was lost in the Mediterranean Sea.
R 35	Kriegsmarine	World War II: The R 25-class minesweeper was bombed and sunk by a Douglas A-20 Havoc aircraft in the Black Sea. Later raised, repaired and returned to service.
Stanmore	United Kingdom	World War II: Convoy KMS 27: The cargo ship (4,970 GRT) was torpedoed and damaged in the Mediterranean Sea off Cape Ivi, Algeria (36°41′N 1°10′E) by U-223 (Kriegsmarine). She was taken in tow by HMS Filla (Royal Navy), which rescued the 59 crew. Stanmore was beached at Cape Ténès, Algeria the next day but later broke in two and was declared a total loss.

== 3 October ==
List of shipwrecks: 3 October 1943
Ship	State	Description
HMT Aracari	Royal Navy	The 120.5-foot (36.7 m), 245-ton water boat/naval trawler was wrecked on Filicudi Island, north of Sicily, a total loss.
Emile-Marie	France	World War II: The trawler was sunk by a mine off Hourtin, France. Her ten crew were all lost.
Empire Activity	United Kingdom	The cargo ship ran aground on the Peckford Reef, in Sir Charles Hamilton Sound. She was on a voyage from Botwood, Dominion of Newfoundland to a British port. She floated off and sank.
USS Henley	United States Navy	World War II: The Bagley-class destroyer was torpedoed and sunk at Finschhaven, New Guinea by Ro-108 (Imperial Japanese Navy) with the loss of fifteen of her 258 crew.
HMT Meror	Royal Navy	World War II: The naval trawler (250 GRT, 1905) struck a mine and sank in the North Sea off the mouth of the Humber. The whole crew was rescued.
X 10	Royal Navy	World War II: The X-class midget submarine (27/30 t, 1943) was abandoned by her crew and scuttled in the North Sea.

== 4 October ==
List of shipwrecks: 4 October 1943
Ship	State	Description
F 125	Kriegsmarine	World War II: The Type A Marinefahrprahm was sunk by a mine in the Kerch Strait, Black Sea (45°18′N 36°39′E). There were five dead and five wounded.
F 231	Kriegsmarine	World War II: Operation Leader: The Type A Marinefahrprahm was bombed by aircraft based on USS Ranger (United States Navy) and beached near Sandnessjoen, Norway. Three crew were wounded.
La Plata	Germany	World War II: Operation Leader: The cargo ship was bombed by aircraft based on USS Ranger (United States Navy) and beached near Bodø, Norway.
04 Livadia	Kriegsmarine	World War II: The transport ship was shelled and sunk in the English Channel off Calais, France (51°01′00″N 1°51′03″E) by British shore based artillery. Her whole crew was saved.
RFA Marit	Royal Fleet Auxiliary	World War II: Convoy XT 4: The tanker (5,542 GRT) was torpedoed and sunk in the Mediterranean Sea (32°57′N 21°11′E), by U-596 (Kriegsmarine) with the loss of two of her 72 crew. Survivors were rescued by HMML 350 (Royal Navy).
Rabat	Germany	World War II: Operation Leader: The cargo ship was bombed and sunk by Douglas Dauntless and Grumman Avenger aircraft based on Royal Navy and United States Navy aircraft carriers, including USS Ranger (United States Navy), off Bodø, Norway.
Sachsen	Germany	World War II: The cargo ship was sunk off Bodø, Norway by aircraft based on USS Ranger (United States Navy). She was refloated in 1949 and scrapped.
Skramstad	Kriegsmarine	World War II: Operation Leader: The cargo ship (4,300 GRT, 1925) was bombed at Bodø, Norway, by aircraft based on USS Ranger (United States Navy) and was beached. Of the 835 men above, 1 was killed, 27 missing and 40 wounded. Although declared a constructive total loss, she was salvaged in 1946, repaired and entered Norwegian service as Bertnes.
Topeka	Norway	World War II: Operation Leader: The cargo ship (4,991 GRT, 1925) was bombed by aircraft based on USS Ranger (United States Navy) off Sandnessjøen, Norway, and beached. She was wrecked off Jæren while being towed away on 1 December 1945. Three Norwegian and three or six German crew were killed.
U-279	Kriegsmarine	World War II: The Type VIIC submarine was depth charged and sunk in the Atlantic Ocean (60°40′N 26°30′W) by a Lockheed Ventura aircraft of the United States Navy with the loss of all 48 crew.
U-389	Kriegsmarine	World War II: The Type VIIC submarine was depth charged and sunk in the Atlantic Ocean south west of Iceland (60°51′N 28°26′W) by a Consolidated B-24 Liberator aircraft of 120 Squadron, Royal Air Force with the loss of all 50 crew.
U-422	Kriegsmarine	World War II: The Type VIIC submarine was depth charged and sunk in the Atlantic Ocean (43°18′N 28°58′W) by Grumman TBF Avenger and Grumman F4F Wildcat aircraft based on USS Card (United States Navy) with the loss of all 49 crew.
U-460	Kriegsmarine	World War II: The Type XIV submarine was depth charged and sunk in the Atlantic Ocean (43°18′N 28°58′W) by Grumman TBF Avenger and Grumman F4F Wildcat aircraft based on USS Card (United States Navy) with the loss of 62 of her 64 crew.
UJ 1214 Mars	Kriegsmarine	World War II: The Mob-FD1-class submarine chaser was mined at Bussesund, Norway (70°25′N 31°03′E). One crewman was killed.
Vaagan	Norway	World War II: Operation Leader: The cargo ship (687 GRT, 1921) was bombed and sunk by aircraft based on USS Ranger (United States Navy). The crew was saved.

== 5 October ==
List of shipwrecks: 5 October 1943
Ship	State	Description
Chicago Maru	Japan	World War II: The cargo ship was torpedoed and sunk in the East China Sea by USS Tullibee (United States Navy).
Dikson	Soviet Union	World War II: The cargo ship was torpedoed and sunk in the Kara Sea (75°37′N 89°10′E) by U-302 (Kriegsmarine). Her crew survived.
Fort Fitzgerald	United Kingdom	World War II: Convoy UGS 18: The Fort ship (7,133 GRT, 1943) was bombed and sunk in the Mediterranean Sea off Cape Ténès, Algeria by Dornier Do 217 aircraft of Kampfgeschwader 100, Luftwaffe.
Hanne	Denmark	World War II: The cargo ship struck a mine and sank in the Drogden. She was later refloated, repaired and returned to service.
Konron Maru	Japan	World War II: The passenger ship was torpedoed and sunk in the Tsushima Strait off Honshu by USS Wahoo (United States Navy) with the loss of 544 lives.
Legnano	Regia Marina	World War II: The Azio-class minelayer was bombed and sunk by German aircraft off Leros, Greece.
USS LST-448	United States Navy	World War II: The landing ship tank sank under tow south of Vella Gulf (08°03′S 156°43′E) after being bombed and damaged by Japanese aircraft west of Vella Lavella (07°45′S 156°30′E) on 1 October.
Pommern	Kriegsmarine	World War II: The minelayer struck an Italian mine and sank in the Ligurian Sea 1.5 nautical miles (2.8 km) south of San Remo, Italy. Twenty crew were killed; there were a few survivors.
Prode	Italy	World War II: The cargo ship was sunk at Portolago, Leros by Luftwaffe aircraft.
Unknown motor boats	German Army	World War II: Strelna Raid: Two motor boats were sunk by Soviet frogmen at Strelna.

== 6 October ==
List of shipwrecks: 6 October 1943
Ship	State	Description
Besposhchadny	Soviet Navy	World War II: The Gnevny-class destroyer was bombed and sunk in the Black Sea off the Crimea by Junkers Ju 87 Stukas.
USS Chevalier	United States Navy	World War II: Naval Battle of Vella Lavella: The Fletcher-class destroyer was torpedoed and damaged by Yūgumo (Imperial Japanese Navy), with her bow blown off. She was then rammed in the stern by USS O'Bannon (United States Navy) and further damaged. She managed to sink a Japanese destroyer despite this damage. She was scuttled the next day off Vella Lavella, Solomon Islands by USS La Vallette (United States Navy).
Kanko Maru	Japan	World War II: The cargo ship was torpedoed and sunk in the Sea of Japan by USS Wahoo (United States Navy). 25 crew and 23 troops were killed.
Kazahaya	Imperial Japanese Navy	World War II: The tanker was torpedoed and damaged in the Pacific Ocean off the Caroline Islands by USS Steelhead (United States Navy). She was torpedoed and sunk later that day by USS Tinosa (United States Navy).
Kharkov	Soviet Navy	World War II: The Leningrad-class destroyer was bombed and sunk in the Black Sea off the Crimea by Junkers Ju 87 Stuka aircraft of the Luftwaffe.
No. 11	Soviet Navy	The D-3-class motor torpedo boat was lost on this date.
No. 124	Soviet Navy	The MO-4-class motor anti-submarine boat was lost on this date.
Sposobny	Soviet Navy	World War II: The Soobrazitelny-class destroyer was bombed and sunk in the Black Sea off the Crimea by Junkers Ju 87 Stuka aircraft.
Yūgumo	Imperial Japanese Navy	World War II: Naval Battle of Vella Lavella: The Yūgumo-class destroyer was shelled, torpedoed and sunk 15 miles (24 km) north west of Vella Lavella (07°33′S 156°14′E) by USS Chevalier and USS Selfridge (both United States Navy) with the loss of 138 of her 225 crew including her captain. U.S. PT boats rescued seventy-eight survivors and another twenty-five reached friendly lines in an abandoned U.S. lifeboat.

== 7 October ==
List of shipwrecks: 7 October 1943
Ship	State	Description
Eridania	Regia Marina	World War II: The cargo ship was torpedoed and sunk in the Aegean Sea off Cape Promontore, Yugoslavia by ORP Sokół (Polish Navy) with the loss of 12 lives.
F 336	Kriegsmarine	World War II: The Type C2 Marinefahrprahm was sunk by Allied warships in the Aegean Sea off Stampalia Island.
F 496	Kriegsmarine	World War II: The Type C2 Marinefahrprahm was damaged beyond repair by gunfire from HMS Unruly (Royal Navy) in the Aegean Sea and was beached on Stampalia Island. Three crew were killed and the other were captured by Italian for some time. She was not repaired.
Ivorca	Italy	World War II: The cargo ship was bombed and sunk by Luftwaffe aircraft off Leros, Greece.
Karpathos	Kriegsmarine	The Type A Marinefahrprahm was sunk on this date.
Kikukawa Maru	Imperial Japanese Navy	The Shunko Maru-class auxiliary transport caught fire and burned at Eten Island, Truk. She exploded when the fire reached her cargo of fuel, sinking in 120 feet (37 m) of water. Five crewmen and 39 passengers were killed aboard Kikukawa Maru. The explosion also blew apart the salvage tugboat Ojima (Imperial Japanese Navy) that had gone to her assistance.
USS LCT-196	United States Navy	The LCT Mk 5-class landing craft tank broke in half in heavy seas off coast of North Africa; the after section was scuttled by British surface ship but the forward section was towed to Bizerte, Tunisia.
USS LCT-215	United States Navy	The LCT-1-class landing craft tank foundered in heavy seas off the North African coast.
USS LCT-216	United States Navy	The LCT-1-class landing craft tank foundered in heavy seas off the North African coast.
HMS LCT 621	Royal Navy	The LCT-4-class landing craft tank (350/640 t, 1942) was lost in the Mediterranean Sea.
Ojima	Imperial Japanese Navy	The Tategami-class salvage tug was blown in two and sunk in 120 feet (37 m) of water with a great loss of life at Eten Island, Truk, when Kikukawa Maru (Imperial Japanese Navy) exploded while she was alongside providing assistance fighting a fire aboard.
Olympos	Germany	World War II: The cargo ship was sunk south of Levitha, Greece by Royal Navy vessels.
USS S-44	United States Navy	World War II: The S-class submarine was shelled and sunk by Ishigaki (Imperial Japanese Navy) 18 nautical miles (33 km) from Uomi Saki, Aruito Island, Kuril Islands. Two survivors were rescued and made prisoners of war; 55 crew were killed.
Stylis	Kriegsmarine	The Type C Marinefahrprahm was sunk on this date.
Tinos	Kriegsmarine	The Type C2 Marinefahrprahm was sunk on this date.
UJ 2111 Tramaglio	Kriegsmarine	World War II: The submarine chaser was shelled and sunk by British warships north of Stampalia, Dodecanese.

== 8 October ==
List of shipwrecks: 8 October 1943
Ship	State	Description
Bulgaria	Kriegsmarine	World War II: The minelayer was torpedoed and sunk in the Aegean Sea by HMS Unruly (Royal Navy). Of the 366 men aboard (285 troops and 81 crew), 302 were reported to have been rescued two days later.
Dainiti Maru	Imperial Japanese Army	World War II: Convoy 772: The Iwatesan Maru-class auxiliary troopship (5,814 GRT, 1922) (a.k.a. Dainiti Maru) was torpedoed and sunk in the South China Sea west of Luzon, Philippines in the Luzon Strait (18°48′N 119°21′E) by USS Gurnard (United States Navy) with the loss of 2,025 military and 32 crew.
Kashu Maru	Imperial Japanese Army	World War II: The Yoshida Maru No. 1-class auxiliary transport ship was torpedoed and sunk in the Pacific Ocean about 85 miles (137 km) north of Manus, Admiralty Islands (00°26′S 146°17′E) by USS Guardfish (United States Navy). One crewman was killed.
ORP Orkan	Polish Navy	World War II: Convoy SC 143: The M-class destroyer was torpedoed and sunk in the Atlantic Ocean off Greenland (56°30′N 26°26′W) by U-378 (Kriegsmarine) with the loss of 184 of her 228 crew. Survivors were rescued by HMS Musketeer (Royal Navy).
Taian Maru	Imperial Japanese Army	World War II: Convoy 772: The Tian Maru-class auxiliary transport ship was torpedoed and sunk in the South China Sea west of Luzon in the Luzon Strait (18°48′N 119°21′E) by USS Gurnard (United States Navy). 45 military personnel and 32 crewmen were killed.
U-419	Kriegsmarine	World War II: The Type VIIC submarine was depth charged and sunk in the Atlantic Ocean (56°31′N 27°05′W) by Consolidated B-24 Liberator aircraft of 86 Squadron, Royal Air Force with the loss of 48 of her 49 crew.
U-610	Kriegsmarine	World War II: The Type VIIC submarine was depth charged and sunk in the Atlantic Ocean (55°45′N 24°33′W) by a Short Sunderland aircraft of 423 Squadron, Royal Canadian Air Force with the loss of all 51 crew.
U-643	Kriegsmarine	World War II: The Type VIIC submarine was depth charged and sunk in the Atlantic Ocean (56°14′N 26°55′W) by Consolidated B-24 Liberator aircraft of 86 and 120 Squadrons, Royal Air Force with the loss of 30 of her 48 crew.

== 9 October ==
List of shipwrecks: 9 October 1943
Ship	State	Description
USS Buck	United States Navy	World War II: Operation Avalanche: The Sims-class destroyer was torpedoed and sunk in the Tyrrhenian Sea off Salerno, Italy (39°57′N 14°28′E) by U-616 (Kriegsmarine) with the loss of 150 of her 247 crew. Survivors were rescued by USS Gleaves (United States Navy) and HMS LCT-170 (Royal Navy.
C	Kriegsmarine	World War II: The hospital ship was set afire at Gotenhafen during an American air raid with the loss of 48 lives. She was towed out of port, shelled and sunk.
HMS Carlisle	Royal Navy	World War II: The C-class cruiser (4,290/5,236 t, 1918) was bombed and severely damaged in the Scarpanto Strait by Junkers Ju 87 aircraft of I Staffeln, Sturzkampfgeschwader 3, Luftwaffe. She was towed to Alexandria, Egypt by HMS Rockwood (Royal Navy) but was deemed a constructive total loss. She spent the rest of the war as a stores ship at Alexandria and was scrapped in 1949. 24 crew were killed or died of wounds.
Cuxhaven	Germany	World War II: The Hansa A Type cargo ship is severely damaged in an Allied air raid on Gotenhafen.
Hankow Maru	Japan	World War II: The cargo ship was torpedoed and sunk in the Pacific Ocean by USS Wahoo (United States Navy).
Kogane Maru	Japan	World War II: The cargo liner was torpedoed and sunk in the Banda Sea off Ambon Island by USS Rasher (United States Navy).
MS-26	Regia Marina	The MS-11-class E-boat was wrecked at Leros, Greece.
HMS Panther	Royal Navy	World War II: The P-class destroyer (1,640/2,250 t, 1941) was bombed and sunk in the Scarpanto Strait by Junkers Ju 87 aircraft of I Staffeln, Sturzkampfgeschwader 3, Luftwaffe with the loss of 36 crew. Survivors were rescued by Miaoulis (Hellenic Navy).
UJ 1210	Kriegsmarine	World War II: The KUJ-class submarine chaser was sunk at Gotenhafen during an American air raid.
Yorkmar	United States	World War II: Convoy SC 143: The cargo ship was torpedoed and sunk in the Atlantic Ocean 475 nautical miles (880 km) south of Iceland (56°38′N 20°30′W) by U-645 (Kriegsmarine) with the loss of 13 of the 67 people aboard. Survivors were rescued by HMS Duckworth (Royal Navy) and HMCS Kamloops (Royal Canadian Navy).

== 10 October ==
List of shipwrecks: 10 October 1943
Ship	State	Description
F 474	Kriegsmarine	World War II: The Type C Marinefährprahm (155 GRT) was torpedoed and sunk in the Black Sea off Yalta, Soviet Union (44°28′N 34°13′E) by A-2 (Soviet Navy). One crew died.
Hino Maru No. 5	Imperial Japanese Navy	World War II: The Mikage Maru No. 20-class auxiliary transport was bombed and sunk 24 nautical miles (44 km; 28 mi) west of Buka, Bouganville (05°25′S 154°17′E) by Consolidated B-24 Liberator aircraft of the United States Army Air Force.
Isuzugawa Maru	Japan	World War II: Convoy No. 432: The transport ship was torpedoed and sunk in the South China Sea west of Luzon, Philippines by USS Bonefish (United States Navy). Two passengers and two crew were killed.
Mario Roselli	Germany	World War II: The cargo ship, packed with about 5,500 Italian prisoners of war, was bombed and damaged in Corfu Bay by Allied aircraft with the loss of 1,302 lives. She was bombed again the following day and sunk.
No. 311	Soviet Navy	The Project 1125 armored motor gunboat was lost on this date.
Schiff 47 Wilhelm Huth	Kriegsmarine	The decoy ship was sunk on this date.
StuBo 1041	Kriegsmarine	The StuBo42 type landing craft/motor launch was sunk on this date.
Teibi Maru	Japan	World War II: Convoy No. 432: The transport ship was torpedoed and damaged in the South China Sea west of Luzon (14°44′N 110°19′E) by USS Bonefish (United States Navy). She was beached on Mysury but sank. Six passengers and eight crew were killed.

== 11 October ==
List of shipwrecks: 11 October 1943
Ship	State	Description
George H. Himes	United States	World War II: The Liberty ship was torpedoed by Japanese aircraft off Koli Point, Guadalcanal and was beached. Later repaired and returned to service.
HMML 1054	Royal Navy	The Harbour Defence Motor Launch (46/52 t, 1941) was wrecked off the mouth of the Tees.
HMS Hythe	Royal Navy	World War II: The Bangor-class minesweeper (656/820 t, 1942) was torpedoed and sunk by U-371 (Kriegsmarine) in the Mediterranean Sea off Bougie, Algeria (37°04′N 5°00′E) with the loss of all 62 crew.
Jalabala	India	World War II: The cargo ship (3,610 GRT, 1927) was torpedoed and sunk in the Laccadive Sea west of Cape Comorin (11°40′N 75°19′E) by U-532 (Kriegsmarine) with the loss of five of her 77 crew.
John H. Couch	United States	World War II: The Liberty ship was torpedoed by Japanese aircraft off Koli Point, Guadalcanal and set on fire resulting in the ship being burned out. Three crew were killed. She was taken under tow by USS Pawnee (United States Navy) but capsized and sank on 13 October two miles east of Koli Point.
USS Wahoo	United States Navy	World War II: The Gato-class submarine was bombed and sunk in the La Perousé Strait, Sea of Japan by Japanese aircraft with the loss of all 60 crew.

== 12 October ==
List of shipwrecks: 12 October 1943
Ship	State	Description
Ammerland	Kriegsmarine	World War II: The Sperrbrecher was torpedoed and sunk by S-55 (Soviet Navy) off the North Cape, Norway (70°59′N 26°26′E).
Keisho Maru	Imperial Japanese Navy	World War II: The Keisho Maru-class auxiliary transport ship was bombed and sunk at Rabaul, New Guinea (05°15′S 152°40′E) during an air raid by the United States Fifth Air Force and Royal Australian Air Force.
Kosei Maru	Japan	World War II: The transport ship was bombed and sunk at Rabaul during an air raid by the United States Fifth Air Force and Royal Australian Air Force.
Kurogone Maru	Japan	World War II: The cargo ship was bombed and sunk at Rabaul during an air raid by the United States Fifth Air Force and Royal Australian Air Force.
Mishima Maru	Imperial Japanese Navy	World War II: The guard ship was bombed and sunk at Rabaul during an air raid by the United States Fifth Air Force and Royal Australian Air Force.
HMML 835	Royal Navy	World War II: The Fairmile B motor launch (76/86 t, 1943) was bombed and sunk at Leros, Greece.
SKR-14	Soviet Navy	The auxiliary guard boat ran aground in Yenisey Bay, sinking on 17 October.
Tsukinada Maru	Japan	World War II: The cargo ship was damaged in an air attack in Simpson Harbor, Rabaul and beached.
Wakamatsu Maru No. 1	Japan	World War II: The cargo ship was bombed and sunk at Rabaul during an air raid by the United States Fifth Air Force and Royal Australian Air Force. Six crew were killed.

== 13 October ==
List of shipwrecks: 13 October 1943
Ship	State	Description
USS Bristol	United States Navy	World War II: The Gleaves-class destroyer was torpedoed and sunk in the Mediterranean Sea off Algiers, Algeria (37°19′N 6°19′E) by U-371 (Kriegsmarine) with the loss of 52 of her 276 crew. Survivors were rescued by the destroyers USS Trippe and USS Wainwright (both United States Navy).
Daishin Maru No. 8	Japan	World War II: The cargo ship was sunk at Amoy, China during an American air raid.
Kenkoku Maru	Japan	World War II: The cargo ship was torpedoed and sunk in the Pacific Ocean by USS Rasher (United States Navy).
Marguerite	Germany	World War II: The ship struck a mine and sank in the Ionian Sea with the loss of at least 544 lives.
Kongo Maru	Imperial Japanese Navy	World War II: The auxiliary submarine chaser was sunk at Amoy during an American air raid.
SF 110	Kriegsmarine	The Siebel ferry was lost on this date.
Telde	Germany	World War II: The transport ship struck a mine and sank off Aalborg, Denmark.
U-402	Kriegsmarine	World War II: The Type VIIC submarine was torpedoed and sunk in the Atlantic Ocean (48°56′N 29°41′W) by Grumman TBF Avenger aircraft based on USS Card (United States Navy) with the loss of all 50 crew.
Wa-101	Imperial Japanese Navy	World War II: The Djember-class minesweeper was sunk near Madura, Netherlands East Indies (07°11′S 112°45′E) by a mine. Raised, but not repaired until after the War, and returned to Dutch service.

== 14 October ==
List of shipwrecks: 14 October 1943
Ship	State	Description
USCGC Dow	United States Coast Guard	The patrol ship was lost by grounding off Mayaguez, Puerto Rico. The whole crew survived.
Kozui Maru	Imperial Japanese Navy	World War II: The Akiura Maru-class auxiliary emergency oiler was torpedoed and sunk in the East China Sea north west of Okinawa (27°35′N 127°30′E) by USS Grayback (United States Navy). Twenty-one passengers, four gunners and three crew were killed.

== 15 October ==
List of shipwrecks: 15 October 1943
Ship	State	Description
Balcic	Romania	World War II: The cargo ship was attacked by Luftwaffe aircraft and sank at Split, Yugoslavia. She was refloated on 15 August 1947. Subsequently repaired and entered Yugoslav service as Srem.
Chicago Maru	Imperial Japanese Army	World War II: Convoy No. 105: The Tacoma Maru-class transport was torpedoed and sunk in the South China Sea off the west coast of Formosa (24°30′N 120°26′E) by USS Tullibee (United States Navy). forty-two troops and eight crew were killed. Survivors were rescued by San Ramon Maru (Imperial Japanese Navy), Nichiei Maru (Imperial Japanese Navy) and Gyokurei Maru (Japan).
Essex Lance	United Kingdom	World War II: Convoy ONS 20: The cargo ship (6,625 GRT, 1918) straggled behind the convoy. She was torpedoed and sunk in the Atlantic Ocean south east of Cape Farewell, Greenland (57°53′N 28°00′W) by U-426 (Kriegsmarine). All 52 crew were rescued by Accrington (United Kingdom).
Ghambria	United Kingdom	World War II: The Scapa Flow blockship was raised and refloated and then re-sunk in Liverpool Bay for use as sonar target.
James Russell Lowell	United States	World War II: Convoy GUS 18: The Liberty ship was torpedoed and damaged in the Mediterranean Sea off the coast of Algeria by U-371 (Kriegsmarine). All 76 crew were rescued by HMT Southern Sea (Royal Navy) She was beached at Philippeville where she was declared a constructive total loss. The ship broke in two and sank two weeks later.
Merano	Italy	World War II: The cargo ship was scuttled in the Adriatic Sea off Cazza Island, Croatia when her convoy was intercepted by the British destroyers HMS Tumult, HMS Ilex and HMS Tyrian (all Royal Navy). All crew and passengers were rescued by the British ships.
HMS MTB 636	Royal Navy	World War II: The Fairmile D motor torpedo boat (90/107 t, 1943) was sunk in error by gunfire by HMS MGB 658 (Royal Navy) off Elba. Seven crew were killed and two more died of wounds.
SF 169	Kriegsmarine	World War II: The Siebel ferry was sunk off Elba by British motor torpedo boats or by Allied fighter-bomber aircraft with the loss of nine lives.
SF 176	Kriegsmarine	World War II: The Siebel ferry was sunk off Elba by British motor torpedo boats or by Allied fighter-bomber aircraft with the loss of eight lives.
TK-32	Soviet Navy	World War II: The G-5-class motor torpedo boat was sunk by a mine off Zhelezny Rog in the Black Sea. Four crew were killed.

== 16 October ==
List of shipwrecks: 16 October 1943
Ship	State	Description
CHa-31	Imperial Japanese Navy	World War II: The CHa-1-class auxiliary submarine chaser was bombed and sunk off New Britain by US aircraft.
LS 5	Kriegsmarine	The LS 2-class light schnellboot was lost on this date. (More likely lost the next day aboard Michel (Kriegsmarine).
Kari	Germany	World War II: The cargo ship was torpedoed and sunk in the Aegean Sea off Piraeus, Greece by HMS Torbay (Royal Navy). She was carrying German soldiers. About 180 of the 500 aboard were killed.
HMS MTB 356	Royal Navy	World War II: The Vosper 73 ft-class motor torpedo boat (39/47 t, 1943) was sunk in the North Sea by gunfire from Kriegsmarine surface vessels off the coast of the Netherlands.
USS Moonstone	United States Navy	The naval yacht collided with USS Greer (United States Navy) in the Atlantic Ocean off the mouth of Delaware's Indian River (38°30′N 74°06′W) and sank with the loss of one of her 50 crew.
Olimpia	Germany	World War II: The cargo ship was scuttled by her German guards in the Adriatic Sea off Mljet Island, Croatia when her convoy was intercepted by the British destroyers HMS Tumult, HMS Ilex and HMS Tyrian (all Royal Navy). All aboard, 12 Italian and 47 German, were captured.
PiLB 60	Kriegsmarine	The PiLB 39 Type personnel landing craft was lost on this date.
Sloga	Yugoslavia	The cargo ship was driven ashore at Long Point, Newfoundland. She was a total loss.
U-470	Kriegsmarine	World War II: The Type VIIC submarine was depth charged and sunk in the Western Approaches (58°20′N 29°20′W) by Consolidated B-24 Liberator aircraft of 59 and 120 Squadrons, Royal Air Force with the loss of 46 of her 48 crew.
U-533	Kriegsmarine	World War II: The Type IXC/40 submarine was depth charged and sunk in the Gulf of Oman by Bristol Bisley aircraft of 244 Squadron, Royal Air Force with the loss of 52 of her 53 crew.
U-844	Kriegsmarine	World War II: The Type IXC/40 submarine was depth charged and sunk in the Atlantic Ocean south west of Iceland (58°30′N 27°16′W) by two Consolidated B-24 Liberator aircraft of 59 and 86 Squadrons, Royal Air Force with the loss of all 53 crew.
U-964	Kriegsmarine	World War II: The Type VIIC submarine was depth charged and sunk in the Atlantic Ocean south west of Iceland (57°27′N 27°17′W) by Consolidated B-24 Liberator aircraft of 86 Squadron, Royal Air Force with the loss of 47 of her 50 crew. Survivors were rescued by U-231 (Kriegsmarine).
UJ-2109	Kriegsmarine	World War II: The submarine chaser, a former Hunt-class minesweeper, was sunk at Kalymnos, Greece by HMS Jervis and HMS Penn (both Royal Navy). Five crew were killed.

== 17 October ==
List of shipwrecks: 17 October 1943
Ship	State	Description
Chalkis	Kriegsmarine	The Type A Marinefahrprahm was sunk on this date.
LS 4 Esua	Kriegsmarine	World War II: The LS 2-class light schnellboot was lost when Michel (Kriegsmarine) was sunk.
Michel	Kriegsmarine	World War II: The auxiliary cruiser was torpedoed and sunk in the Pacific Ocean east of Yokohama, Japan (33°39′N 139°01′E by USS Tarpon (United States Navy) with the loss of 290 of her 406 crew.
Trapani	Kriegsmarine	World War II: The transport ship was shelled and damaged at Aegean Sea by HMS Hursley (L84) (Royal Navy and Miaoulis (Royal Hellenic Navy). She put into Kalymnos, where she was sunk the next day by HMS Jervis and HMS Penn (both Royal Navy).
U-540	Kriegsmarine	World War II: The IXC/40 submarine was depth charged and sunk in the Atlantic Ocean east of Cape Farewell, Greenland (58°38′N 31°56′W) by Consolidated B-24 Liberator aircraft of 59 and 120 Squadrons, Royal Air Force with the loss of all 55 crew.
U-631	Kriegsmarine	World War II: The Type VIIC submarine was depth charged and sunk in the Atlantic Ocean south east of Cape Farewell (58°13′N 32°29′W) by HMS Sunflower (Royal Navy) with the loss of all 54 crew.
U-841	Kriegsmarine	World War II: The Type IXC/40 submarine was depth charged and sunk in the Atlantic Ocean east of Cape Farewell (59°57′N 31°06′W) by HMS Byard (Royal Navy) with the loss of 27 of her 54 crew.

== 18 October ==
List of shipwrecks: 18 October 1943
Ship	State	Description
CH-23	Imperial Japanese Navy	World War II: The CH-13-class submarine chaser was bombed and had her bow blown off in St. George's Channel near Rabaul by a North American B-25 Mitchell aircraft of the 500th Bomb Squadron, 345th Bomb Group, United States Army Air Forces. She was beached to prevent sinking. Refloated, repaired and returned to service by mid-December.
Elizabeth Hendrik Fisser	Germany	World War II: The cargo ship struck a mine and sank in the Adriatic Sea 6 nautical miles (11 km) off Dubrovnik, Yugoslavia. Her crew were rescued.
GK 51 Aghios Minas	Kriegsmarine	World War II: The guard ship was bombed and sunk north of Cape Spara, Crete.
Taichu Maru	Japan	World War II: The cargo ship was torpedoed and sunk in the Pacific Ocean south of Honshu by USS Lapon (United States Navy). 33 crew and 3 gunners were killed.
Tairin Maru	Imperial Japanese Army	World War II: Convoy So-406: The cargo ship was torpedoed and sunk in the Pacific Ocean (00°22′N 143°23′E) by USS Silversides (United States Navy). Two gunners, one watchman, and one crewman were killed.

== 19 October ==
List of shipwrecks: 19 October 1943
Ship	State	Description
Aversa	Italy	World War II: The cargo ship was torpedoed and sunk in the Ligurian Sea off Rapallo by HMS Ultor (Royal Navy).
Delisle	United States	World War II: Convoy WB 65: The cargo ship struck a mine and sank in the Atlantic Ocean 15 nautical miles (28 km) off St. John's, Newfoundland (47°19′N 52°27′W). All 42 crew were rescued by HMCS Miscou (Royal Canadian Navy).
F 330	Kriegsmarine	The Type A Marinefahrprahm burned for an unknown reason off Kos Island.
No. 72	Soviet Navy	The Project 1124 armored motor gunboat was lost on this date.
Penolver	United Kingdom	World War II: Convoy WB 65: The cargo ship (3,721 GRT, 1912) struck a mine and sank in the Atlantic Ocean 15 nautical miles (28 km) off St. John's (47°19′N 52°27′W) with the loss of 26 of her 40 crew. Survivors were rescued by HMCS Miscou (Royal Canadian Navy).
Sinfra	Germany	World War II: The transport ship was sunk in the Aegean Sea by Bristol Beaufighter aircraft of the Royal Air Force and North American B-25 Mitchell aircraft of the United States Army Air Force with the loss of 1,857 of the 2,593 people on board.

== 20 October ==
List of shipwrecks: 20 October 1943
Ship	State	Description
F 131	Kriegsmarine	The Type A Marinefahrprahm was torpedoed and sunk by MTB 307 (Royal Navy) off Marmari, Kos Island.
Gulfbelle	United States	The tanker was damaged in a collision with sister ship Gulfland (United States) off Florida. There was an explosion on Gulfland and both ships caught fire. The ship was beached, but later was towed away. 88 of 116 crewmen between the two ships died.
Gulfland	United States	The tanker was damaged in a collision with sister ship Gulfbelle (United States) off Florida. There was an explosion and both ships caught fire. 88 of 116 crewmen between the two ships died. The abandoned ship drifted for 53 days eventually grounding off Hobe Sound, Florida. She was scuttled in 15 feet (4.6 m) of water. A salvage attempt was made in 1944 but she broke in two, with her bow sinking again in 28 feet (8.5 m) of water at 26°56′N 80°01′W. Her stern was towed away.
Nagaragawa Maru	Japan	World War II: The cargo ship was bombed and sunk off Dutch New Guinea, Dutch East Indies (00°19′S 132°24′E).
Sana Maru	Japan	World War II: The cargo ship was torpedoed and sunk in Bandon Bay, French Indochina (12°36′N 109°30′E) by USS Kingfish (United States Navy).
U-378	Kriegsmarine	World War II: The Type VIIC submarine was depth charged and sunk in the Atlantic Ocean (47°40′N 28°27′W) by Grumman TBM Avenger and Grumman F4F Wildcat aircraft based on USS Core (United States Navy) with the loss of all 48 crew.

== 21 October ==
List of shipwrecks: 21 October 1943
Ship	State	Description
HMCS Chedabucto	Royal Canadian Navy	The Bangor-class minesweeper collided in the St Lawrence River with Lord Kelvin (United Kingdom) and sank with the loss of one of her 72 crew. (Look 31/10/1943)
Goshu Maru	Japan	World War II: The troopship was torpedoed and sunk in the Pacific Ocean south east of Ulithi by USS Steelhead (United States Navy).
USS Murphy	United States Navy	World War II: While escorting a convoy, the Benson-class destroyer was in collision with Bulkoil (United Kingdom) off the coast of New York/New Jersey and was cut in two. The bow section sank with the loss of 36 of her 265 crew. The stern section was repaired and returned to service with a new bow section.
HMT Orfasy	Royal Navy	World War II: The naval trawler (545 GRT, 1942) was torpedoed and sunk in the Atlantic Ocean (5°58′N 11°30′W) 185 miles southeast of Freetown, Liberia by U-68 (Kriegsmarine) with the loss of all 30 crew.
Saltwick	United Kingdom	World War II: Convoy MKS 28: The cargo ship (3,775 GRT, 1928) was torpedoed and sunk in the Mediterranean Sea off Cape Ténès, Algeria (36°55′N 1°36′E) by Junkers Ju 88 aircraft of III Staffeln, Kampfgeschwader 26, Luftwaffe with the loss of one of her 52 crew.
Tivives	United States	World War II: Convoy MKS 28: The cargo ship was torpedoed and sunk in the Mediterranean Sea off Cape Ténès (36°55′N 1°36′E) by Junkers Ju 88 aircraft of III Staffeln, Kampfgeschwader 26. A gunner and a crewman were killed. Survivors, 24 gunners, a passenger, six members of the Convoy Commodore's staff, and 47 crewmen, were rescued by HMS La Malouine (Royal Navy).
U-431	Kriegsmarine	World War II: The Type VIIC submarine was depth charged and sunk in the Mediterranean Sea off Algiers, Algeria by a Vickers Wellington aircraft of 179 Squadron, Royal Air Force with the loss of all 52 crew.

== 22 October ==
List of shipwrecks: 22 October 1943
Ship	State	Description
Adrias	Hellenic Navy	Adrias in December 1943 World War II: The Hunt-class destroyer struck a mine in the Aegean Sea off Kalymnos, losing her bow. She was beached at Gümüşlük, Turkey (37°02′N 27°06′E). 21 crewmen were killed and 30 wounded. She was refloated on 1 December and proceeded on her own power to Egypt, but was later declared a total constructive loss and not repaired.
Awata Maru	Imperial Japanese Navy	World War II: Operation Tei No. 4: The Akagi Maru-class auxiliary transport ship was torpedoed in the East China Sea off Keelung, Formosa north of Miyako-jima (26°32′N 125°05′E) by USS Grayback (United States Navy), exploded and sank. 1,087 troops of the 17th Infantry Division and 223 crew died. 164 survivors, Her commanding officer, 2 officers, and 85 ratings from the IJN and 1 captain, 4 junior officers, and 71 men from the Imperial Japanese Army were rescued by Maikaze and Nowaki (both Imperial Japanese Navy).
F 541	Kriegsmarine	World War II: The Type C Marinefährprahm was torpedoed in the Mediterranean Sea east of Imperia, Italy by HMS Unseen (Royal Navy) with her aft section sinking and the forward section being towed and beached near Oneglia by F 484 (Kriegsmarine) after rescuing six wounded survivors. 13 crewmen were killed.
HMS Hurworth	Royal Navy	World War II: The Hunt-class destroyer (1,050/1,430 t, 1941) struck a mine and sank in the Aegean Sea (36°59′N 27°06′E) off Kalymnos with the loss of 133 crew. Eighty-five crew were rescued.
Juminda	Kriegsmarine	World War II: The minelayer was torpedoed and sunk in the Tyrrhenian Sea off Santo Stefano, Italy by USS PT-206, USS PT-212 and USS PT-216 (all United States Navy). 63 crew were killed and 16 survived.
RFA Litiopa	Royal Fleet Auxiliary	World War II: The tanker (5,356 GRT, 1917) was torpedoed and damaged in the Atlantic Ocean (6°18′N 11°55′W) by U-68 (Kriegsmarine). She sank the next day. All 35 crew survived, some of them were rescued by HMS Snowdrop (Royal Navy) while others reached land in their lifeboats.
Martin Wallner	Germany	World War II: The tugboat was sunk by a mine in the Black Sea.
T 157	Kriegsmarine	World War II: The torpedo recovery ship, a former V150-class torpedo boat, struck a mine and sank in the Baltic Sea off Gdańsk.

== 23 October ==
List of shipwrecks: 23 October 1943
Ship	State	Description
Campos	Brazil	World War II: The cargo liner was torpedoed and sunk in the South Atlantic (25°07′S 45°40′W) by U-170 (Kriegsmarine) with the loss of twelve of the 63 people aboard. Also reported lost at 25°07′N 45°40′W with the loss of sixteen of the 68 people on board.
HMS Charybdis	Royal Navy	World War II: Battle of Sept-Îles: The Dido-class cruiser (5,600 GRT) was torpedoed and sunk in the Bay of Biscay off Ouessant, Finistère, France (48°59′N 3°39′W) by T23 and T27 (both Kriegsmarine) with the loss of 462 crew. There were 107 survivors.
HMS Cromarty	Royal Navy	World War II: The Bangor-class minesweeper (656/820 t, 1941) was sunk by a mine in the Straits of Bonifacio.
Faneromeni	Greece	World War II: The cargo ship was torpedoed and sunk in the Indian Ocean north west Madagascar (16°21′S 40°04′E) by I-37 (Imperial Japanese Navy). One crew was killed, 37 survived.
James Iredell	United States	World War II: The Liberty ship was struck by three bombs dropped by German aircraft at Naples, Italy, and burned for 64 hours. She was repaired and later sunk as a blockship off Omaha Beach on 8 June 1944.
Kyowa Maru	Japan	World War II: The transport ship was bombed and sunk in the Pacific Ocean north west of Bougainville Island by United States Army Air Force aircraft.
HMS LCI(L) 309	Royal Navy	World War II: The landing craft infantry (large) (194/387 t, 1943) was bombed and sunk by a German aircraft in the Bay of Biscay (47°10′N 13°55′W). Four crew were killed and another died of his wounds. LCI(L) 185 rescued 18 survivors.
HMS Limbourne	Royal Navy	World War II: Battle of Sept-Îles: The Hunt-class destroyer (1,050 GRT) was torpedoed off Ouessant by T22 (Kriegsmarine) and severely damaged. She was scuttled by two torpedoes from HMS Rocket (Royal Navy). 39 British sailors and four embarked American artillerymen were killed, and 3 more British sailors died of wounds.
Tanais	Soviet Union	World War II: The coaster was torpedoed and sunk in the Black Sea off Poti (42°22′N 41°35′E) by U-23 (Kriegsmarine) with the loss of 11 of her 21 crew.
Taranto	Kriegsmarine	World War II: The Magdeburg-class cruiser was bombed and sunk by Allied aircraft. Later raised, and sunk once more in September 1944. Scrapped in 1946–47.
U-274	Kriegsmarine	World War II: The Type VIIC submarine was depth charged and sunk in the Atlantic Ocean south west of Iceland (57°14′N 27°50′W) by HMS Duncan, HMS Vidette (both Royal Navy) and a B-24 Liberator of 224 Squadron, Royal Air Force with the loss of all 48 hands.

== 24 October ==
List of shipwrecks: 24 October 1943
Ship	State	Description
HMS Eclipse	Royal Navy	World War II: The E-class destroyer (1,405/1,940 t, 1934) struck a mine and sank in the Aegean Sea east of Kalymnos, Greece (37°01′N 27°11′E) with the loss of 119 of her 145 crew and 134 troops.
Hino Maru	Imperial Japanese Navy	World War II: The auxiliary gunboat was bombed and sunk in the Pacific Ocean south west of Rabaul, New Britain by Consolidated B-24 Liberator aircraft of the United States Army Air Force.
Johore Maru	Imperial Japanese Army	World War II: Convoy O-006: The Nagoya Maru-class transport ship was torpedoed and sunk in the Pacific Ocean (2°05′N 144°39′E) by USS Silversides (United States Navy). Seventy-seven passengers and seven crew were killed.
Kazan Maru	Imperial Japanese Army	World War II: Convoy O-006: The cargo ship was torpedoed and sunk in the Pacific Ocean (02°30′N 144°44′E) by USS Silversides (United States Navy). Four guards and three crew were killed.
Mochizuki	Imperial Japanese Navy	World War II: The Mutsuki-class destroyer was bombed and sunk in the Solomon Sea 90 miles south south west of Rabaul (05°42′S 151°40′E) by United States Navy Consolidated PBY Catalina aircraft. Ten crew were killed. Survivors were rescued by Uzuki (Imperial Japanese Navy).
Muraviev	Soviet Union	World War II: The water tanker was destroyed by exploding cargo while unloading in the Port of Krasnovod. Ten crewmen killed.
Orlyonok	Soviet Union	World War II: The cargo ship was destroyed by exploding cargo while unloading in the Port of Krasnovod. Unknown if it was her cargo or that of Osetin (Soviet Union). Three crewmen killed.
Osetin	Soviet Union	World War II: The cargo ship was destroyed by exploding cargo while unloading in the Port of Krasnovod. Unknown if it was her cargo or that of Orlyonok (Soviet Union). 14 crewmen killed.
Rab	Kriegsmarine	World War II: The coaster was sunk by British aircraft near Crkvice, Kuna Pelješka, Yugoslavia. Raised by Yugoslavia in March, 1945, repaired and returned to service.
Siranger	Norway	World War II: The cargo ship (5,393 GRT, 1939) was torpedoed and sunk in the Atlantic Ocean (0°00′N 39°27′W) by U-155 (Kriegsmarine). All 45 people aboard survived, although one survivor was taken as a prisoner of war.
Tennan Maru	Imperial Japanese Navy	World War II: Convoy O-006: The oiler was torpedoed and sunk in the Pacific Ocean by USS Silversides (United States Navy). Five passengers and 42 crew were killed.
U-566	Kriegsmarine	World War II: The Type VIIC submarine was depth charged and damaged in the Atlantic Ocean north west of the Azores, Portugal by a Vickers Wellington aircraft of 179 Squadron, Royal Air Force. She was consequently scuttled at 41°12′N 9°31′W. All 49 crew survived.
UJ 1403 Mecklenburg	Kriegsmarine	World War II: The submarine chaser (472 GRT) collided with the fishing trawler Anne-Alice (France) and sank in the Bay of Biscay off Belle-Île, Morbihan, France (47°22′N 5°08′W). One crew was killed. Her captain claimed she had struck a mine to conceal the collision and was later court-martialled for that.

== 25 October ==
List of shipwrecks: 25 October 1943
Ship	State	Description
Nissho Maru	Japan	World War II: The tanker was torpedoed and sunk in the Philippine Sea by USS Hoe (United States Navy).
RD 22	Regia Marina	World War II: The RD-class minesweeper was sunk by a mine off Brindisi. All 24 crew were killed.
S 63 and S 88	Kriegsmarine	World War II: The Schnellboote were torpedoed and sunk in the North Sea off Cromer, Norfolk, United Kingdom by HMMGB 603 and HMMGB 607 (both Royal Navy). Alternatively, S 63 was rammed and sunk by HMS Mackay (Royal Navy).
unnamed	Soviet Union	World War II: The fishing vessel was shelled and sunk by U-23 (Kriegsmarine) in the Black Sea.
HMT William Stephen	Royal Navy	World War II: The naval trawler (235 GRT, 1917) was torpedoed and sunk in the North Sea off Cromer by S-74 (Kriegsmarine).

== 26 October ==
List of shipwrecks: 26 October 1943
Ship	State	Description
Agios Konstantinos	Greece	World War II: The caique (22 GRT) was shelled and sunk in the Mediterranean Sea (38°06′N 25°22′E) by HMS Shakespeare (Royal Navy).
Betty H.	Finland	World War II: The cargo ship was torpedoed and sunk in the Baltic Sea (59°54′N 19°54′E) bySC-307 (Soviet Navy).
Dover Maru	Imperial Japanese Army	World War II: The Shinryu Maru-class auxiliary transport was bombed and sunk in the Indian Ocean south of Yangon, Burma by United States Tenth Air Force aircraft. 14 crew and 4 troops were killed.
Hachiman Maru	Japan	World War II: The cargo ship was bombed and sunk in the South China Sea off Hainan, China by North American B-25 Mitchell aircraft of the United States Fourteenth Air Force.
Hokuzan Maru	Japan	World War II: The cargo ship was bombed and sunk off Kiungshan, China (20°05′N 110°25′E) by United States Army Air Force aircraft.
James Longstreet	United States	The Liberty ship was driven ashore at Sandy Hook, Eastham, Massachusetts in a gale and was wrecked. She was subsequently refloated and towed to New York City, where she was dismantled.
HMS ML 579	Royal Navy	World War II: The Fairmile B motor launch (76/86 t, 1943) was bombed and sunk by German aircraft near Leros, Greece. Three crewmen were killed and one died of his wounds.
MS-15	Regia Marina	World War II: The MS-11-class E-boat was sunk by German aircraft at Leros, Greece.
HMMTB 669	Royal Navy	World War II: The Fairmile D motor torpedo boat was shelled and sunk by Kriegsmarine surface ships off Norway.
Shinwa Maru No. 3	Imperial Japanese Army	World War II: The transport ship was bombed and sunk in the South China Sea off Hainan by North American B-25 Mitchell aircraft of the United States Fourteenth Air Force.
Shozan Maru	Japan	World War II: The cargo ship struck a mine and sank in the South China Sea off Haiphong, French Indochina.
HMS Tien Hsing	Royal Navy	The tug (269 GRT, 1935) hit the Abu Galawa Reef in the Red Sea off Egypt and sank.
Yamatogawa Maru	Japan	World War II: The transport ship was bombed and sunk in the South China Sea off Hainan by North American B-25 Mitchell aircraft of the United States Fourteenth Air Force. Seven crew were killed.

== 27 October ==
List of shipwrecks: 27 October 1943
Ship	State	Description
Buenos Aires Maru	Japan	World War II: The ship was bombed and sunk by American aircraft.
Goffredo Mamell	Germany	World War II: The cargo vessel bombed and probably sunk, later raised and resunk on unknown date as a blockship at Muggia. The wreck was salvaged in 1946 and scrapped in 1947.
Nanman Maru	Imperial Japanese Navy	World War II: Convoy FU-607: The Nanman Maru-class auxiliary transport was torpedoed and sunk in the Pacific Ocean (12°02′N 134°28′E) by USS Flying Fish (United States Navy). One crew member was killed.
Padua	Portugal	World War II: The cargo ship, chartered by the International Committee of the Red Cross struck a mine and sank in the Mediterranean Sea off Marseille, Bouches-du-Rhône, France with the loss of six crew.
Tarbya	Kriegsmarine	The Type A Marinefahrprahm was sunk on this date.

== 28 October ==
List of shipwrecks: 28 October 1943
Ship	State	Description
A-3	Soviet Navy	World War II: The A-class submarine was sunk in the Black Sea off Eutaporia by UJ 117 Rila (Kriegsmarine).
Congella	United Kingdom	World War II: The cargo ship (4,533 GRT, 1914) was shelled and sunk in the Indian Ocean north west of Addu Atoll (01°02′N 71°14′E) by I-10 (Imperial Japanese Navy). Three gunners and 25 crewmen were killed, her radio operator was taken as a prisoner of war. Thirty-seven survivors were rescued by HMS Okapi (Royal Navy) and two Consolidated PBY Catalina aircraft of the Royal Air Force.
F 303	Kriegsmarine	World War II: The Type B Marinefährprahm was scuttled at Genitshesk, Soviet Union.
F 492	Kriegsmarine	World War II: The Type C2 Marinefährprahm was scuttled at Genitshesk.
F 493	Kriegsmarine	World War II: The Type C2 Marinefährprahm was scuttled at Genitshesk.
F 577	Kriegsmarine	World War II: The Type C2 Marinefährprahm was scuttled at Genitshesk.
HMS LCT 115	Royal Navy	The LCT-1-class landing craft tank (296/460 t, 1941) was lost in the Mediterranean Sea.
U-220	Kriegsmarine	World War II: The Type X submarine was depth charged and sunk in the Atlantic Ocean (48°53′N 33°30′W) by Grumman TBM Avenger and Grumman F4F Wildcat aircraft based on USS Block Island (United States Navy) with the loss of all 56 crew.
USS YP-88	United States Navy	The yard patrol boat ran aground and sank off Cape Amchitka, Amchitka Island, Alaska Territory.

== 29 October ==
List of shipwrecks: 29 October 1943
Ship	State	Description
Ingeborg	Germany	World War II: The cargo ship was torpedoed and sunk in the Aegean Sea west of Stampalia, Greece (36°33′N 25°54′E) by HMS Unsparing (Royal Navy).
Kuybyshev	Soviet Union	The cargo ship was lost with all 41 hands in the Caspian Sea from unknown causes between Nevashehr, Iran and Makhachkala.
MAL 1	Kriegsmarine	World War II: The MAL 1 type landing fire support lighter was scuttled by her crew in Henichesk, on the Azov Sea.
MAL 3	Kriegsmarine	World War II: The MAL 1 type landing fire support lighter was scuttled by her crew in Henichesk, on the Azov Sea.
MAL 9	Kriegsmarine	World War II: The MAL 1 type landing fire support lighter was scuttled by her crew in Henichesk, on the Azov Sea.
MAL 10	Kriegsmarine	World War II: The MAL 1 type landing fire support lighter was scuttled by her crew in Henichesk, on the Azov Sea.
MAL 11	Kriegsmarine	World War II: The MAL 1 type landing fire support lighter was scuttled by her crew in Henichesk, on the Azov Sea.
U-282	Kriegsmarine	World War II: The Type VIIC submarine was depth charged and sunk in the Atlantic Ocean south east of Iceland (55°28′N 31°57′W) by HMS Duncan, HMS Sunflower and HMS Vidette (all Royal Navy) with the loss of all 48 crew.

== 30 October ==
List of shipwrecks: 30 October 1943
Ship	State	Description
BMO-318	Soviet Navy	World War II: The BMO type submarine chaser was sunk by a mine off Bolshoy Tyuters island in the Gulf of Finland with the loss of at least four crew.
Shangai Maru	Imperial Japanese Navy	The Imperial Japanese Navy-requisitioned cargo-passenger vessel sank 75 miles (121 km) northeast of Shanghai after a collision with the Imperial Japanese Army transport Sakito Maru (Imperial Japanese Army) with the loss of 16 crewmen.
TK-75	Soviet Navy	World War II: The G-5-class motor torpedo boat was shelled and sunk in the Gulf of Finland by German minesweepers with the loss of at least three crew.
TK-134	Soviet Navy	World War II: The G-5-class motor torpedo boat was shelled and sunk in the Gulf of Finland by German minesweepers.

== 31 October ==
List of shipwrecks: 31 October 1943
Ship	State	Description
HMCS Chedabucto	Royal Canadian Navy	World War II: The Bangor-class minesweeper (673/860 t, 1941) sank in the St. Lawrence River in a collision with Lord Kelvin (United Kingdom), with the loss of one of her officers.
Hallfried	Norway	World War II: Convoy MKS 28: The cargo ship (2,968 GRT, 1918) was torpedoed and sunk in the Atlantic Ocean (46°05′N 20°26′W) by U-262 (Kriegsmarine) with the loss of 30 of her 33 crew. Survivors were rescued by HMS Wrestler (Royal Navy).
Heimdal	Kriegsmarine	World War II: The fisheries protection vessel was sunk at Copenhagen, Denmark due to sabotage by the Danish Resistance.
Koryo Maru	Japan	World War II: The tanker was torpedoed and sunk in the Pacific Ocean off Borneo by USS Rasher (United States Navy).
No. 114	Soviet Navy	The No. 41 armored motor gunboat was lost on this date.
No. 1012	Soviet Navy	The MO-4-class motor anti-submarine boat was lost on this date.
New Columbia	United Kingdom	World War II: The cargo ship (6,574 GRT, 1920) was torpedoed and sunk in the North Sea (4°25′N 5°03′E) by U-68 (Kriegsmarine). All 84 crew were rescued by Conakrian (United Kingdom).
SKA-088	Soviet Navy	World War II: The MO-3-class patrol ship (56 GRT) was torpedoed and sunk in the Black Sea off Gagra by U-24 (Kriegsmarine). According to a source she was lost with all hands. The names of five men who died are known.
U-306	Kriegsmarine	World War II: The Type VIIC submarine was depth charged and sunk in the Atlantic Ocean north east of the Azores, Portugal (46°19′N 20°44′W) by HMS Geranium and HMS Whitehall (both Royal Navy) with the loss of all 51 crew.
U-584	Kriegsmarine	World War II: The Type VIIC submarine was sunk in the Atlantic Ocean (49°14′N 31°55′W) by three Grumman TBM Avenger aircraft based on USS Card (United States Navy) with the loss of all 53 crew.
U-732	Kriegsmarine	World War II: The Type VIIC submarine was depth charged and sunk in the Atlantic Ocean (35°54′N 5°52′W) by HMS Douglas, HMT Imperialist and HMT Loch Osaig (all Royal Navy) with the loss of 31 of her 49 crew.
Ujigawa Maru	Japan	World War II: The transport ship was bombed and sunk in the Pacific Ocean off Rabaul, New Guinea by United States Army Air Force aircraft.

== Unknown date ==
List of shipwrecks: Unknown date 1943
Ship	State	Description
Althea	United States	The 12-gross register ton, 63.3-foot (19.3 m) motor cargo vessel sank at Unalakleet, Territory of Alaska.
Anghyra	Greece	The cargo ship was severely damaged by fire in the Pacific Ocean. She was towed in to San Francisco, California, United States on 17 October. She was consequently declared a constructive total loss. Subsequently repaired and entered Panamanian service in 1944 as Spartan.
USS Dorado	United States Navy	World War II: The Gato-class submarine left New Haven, Connecticut on 6 October for the Panama Canal and was not heard from again. Probably struck a mine and sank in the Caribbean Sea on 13 October with the loss of all 60 crew.
HMS LCE 1	Royal Navy	The landing craft, emergency repair (8/10.6 t, 1943) was sunk.
HMS LCE 9	Royal Navy	The landing craft, emergency repair (8/10.6 t, 1943) was sunk.
HMS LCI(L) 309	Royal Navy	The LCI-1-class landing craft infantry was lost. (Look 23/10/1943)
HMS LCM 232	Royal Navy	The landing craft mechanized (21/35 t, 1942) was lost.
HMS LCM 545	Royal Navy	The landing craft mechanized (22/52 t, 1942) was lost.
HMS LCM 938	Royal Navy	The landing craft mechanized (22/52 t, 1942) was lost.
HMS LCM 1044	Royal Navy	The landing craft mechanized (22/52 t, 1942) was lost.
HMS LCM 1165	Royal Navy	The landing craft mechanized (22/52 t, 1942) was lost.
HMS LCM 1182	Royal Navy	The landing craft mechanized (22/52 t, 1942) was lost.
M-172	Soviet Navy	World War II: The M-class submarine was lost after leaving her base on 1 October. Probably lost to a mine off Verangerfjord, Norway.
M-174	Soviet Navy	World War II: The M-class submarine was lost after leaving her base on 14 October. Probably lost to a mine off Verangerfjord, Norway.
HMS ML 1015	Royal Navy	The Harbour Defence Motor Launch (46/52 t, 1941) foundered in a storm in the Mediterranean Sea.
Shch-403	Soviet Navy	World War II: The Shchuka-class submarine was lost after leaving her base on 2 October; probably to a mine off Tanafjord, Norway.
Senji	Italy	World War II: The coaster was sunk by Allied aircraft at Starigrad. Raised by her Yugoslav owners, repaired, and returned to service in 1947.
HMS Trooper	Royal Navy	World War II: The T-class submarine (1,327/1,575 t, 1942) probably struck a mine and sank north of the island of Donoussa in the Icarian Sea, Greece in 770 feet (230 m) of water. The wreck location indicated the rumored sighting of her on 14 October by the schooner LS 8 (Royal Navy) off Alinda Bay was a different submarine. The wreck was located on 3 October 2024.
Unknown	United Kingdom	The concrete petrol barge sank during sea trials sometime in October.
HMS Usurper	Royal Navy	World War II: The U-class submarine (630/730 t, 1943) was possibly sunk in the Gulf of Genoa by UJ 2208 (Kriegsmarine) on 4 October or sunk by a mine around this date. All 46 crew were lost.
U-420	Kriegsmarine	World War II: The Type VIIC submarine disappeared on patrol in the Atlantic Ocean on or after 20 October with the loss of all 49 crew. Cause unknown.
Vienti	Finland	World War II: The cargo ship was sunk at Bremen, Germany. She was salvaged in 1944, repaired, and entered German service as Kommerzienratsieg.
