= Wolfpack Schlieffen =

Schlieffen was a wolfpack of German U-boats that operated during the battle of the Atlantic in World War II.

== Service history ==
Schlieffen was formed in October 1943 to operate against the North Atlantic convoy routes and comprised 14 U-boats. It consisted of 6 U-boats from the disbanded group Rossbach, plus 7 others from bases in France and Germany, while another, U-455, joined from patrols in the Mid Atlantic.

Whilst moving into position a number of boats came under attack, principally from aircraft from USS Card, which was operating against their re-fuelling operation. The tanker U-488 was attacked on 12 October, but suffered little damage; however, U-731, which was also attacked later that day, was forced to return to base. On 13 October two more boats (U-402 and U-603) were attacked, and both were destroyed. Another two boats, U-631 and U-455 collided and were damaged; U-455 was forced to retire to base for repairs, while U-631, with her torpedo tubes out of action, was put on observation duties.

From 15 October Schlieffen operated against convoys ONS 20 and ON 206, which were travelling together; U-boats from Schlieffen sank one ship of 6,625 GRT, but lost six boats (U-470, U-540, U-631, U-841, U-844 and U-964) in one of the most calamitous nights of the campaign for the U-boat arm (U-Bootwaffe, UBW).

Schlieffen was disbanded after this attack, with a number of its boats forming the nucleus of a new group, code-named Siegfried.

== U-boats involved ==
- U-91
- U-231
- U-267
- U-281
- U-309
- U-413
- U-426
- U-437
- U-448
- U-455
- U-470
- U-540
- U-608
- U-631
- U-762
- U-841
- U-842
- U-844

== Name Origin ==
Schlieffen was named for Count Alfred von Schlieffen, a Prussian field marshal and strategist of the 19th century.
