= German submarine U-470 =

German World War II submarine

History

Nazi Germany
- Name: U-470
- Ordered: 20 January 1941
- Builder: Deutsche Werke, Kiel
- Yard number: 301
- Laid down: 11 October 1941
- Launched: 8 August 1942
- Commissioned: 7 January 1943
- Fate: Sunk on 16 October 1943

General characteristics
- Class & type: Type VIIC submarine
- Displacement: 769 tonnes (757 long tons) surfaced; 871 t (857 long tons) submerged
- Length: 67.10 m (220 ft 2 in) o/a; 50.50 m (165 ft 8 in) pressure hull
- Beam: 6.20 m (20 ft 4 in) o/a; 4.70 m (15 ft 5 in) pressure hull
- Height: 9.60 m (31 ft 6 in)
- Draught: 4.74 m (15 ft 7 in)
- Installed power: 2,800–3,200 PS (2,100–2,400 kW; 2,800–3,200 bhp) (diesels); 750 PS (550 kW; 740 shp) (electric)
- Propulsion: 2 shafts; 2 × diesel engines; 2 × electric motors
- Speed: 17.7 knots (32.8 km/h; 20.4 mph) surfaced; 7.6 knots (14.1 km/h; 8.7 mph) submerged
- Range: 8,500 nmi (15,700 km; 9,800 mi) at 10 knots (19 km/h; 12 mph) surfaced; 80 nmi (150 km; 92 mi) at 4 knots (7.4 km/h; 4.6 mph) submerged
- Test depth: 230 m (750 ft); Crush depth: 250–295 m (820–968 ft)
- Complement: 4 officers, 40–56 enlisted
- Armament: 5 × 53.3 cm (21 in) torpedo tubes (four bow, one stern); 14 × torpedoes or 26 TMA mines; 1 × 8.8 cm (3.46 in) deck gun (220 rounds); 1 × twin 2 cm (0.79 in) C/30 anti-aircraft gun

Service record
- Part of: 5th U-boat Flotilla; 7 January – 30 June 1943; 11th U-boat Flotilla; 1 July – 16 October 1943
- Identification codes: M 49 435
- Commanders: Oblt.z.S. Günther-Paul Grave; 7 January – 16 October 1943
- Operations: 1 patrol: 28 September – 16 October 1943
- Victories: None

German submarine U-470 was a Type VIIC U-boat of Nazi Germany's Kriegsmarine built for service in the Second World War. She was a very short-lived vessel, being commissioned in the months following the turning point of the Atlantic campaign and thus into a time in which many U-boats were being lost. The demise of U-470 was especially notable as she was sunk with two of her sisters in a brief melée in the waters of the Western Approaches.

== Design ==
German Type VIIC submarines were preceded by the shorter Type VIIB submarines. U-470 had a displacement of 769 tonnes (757 long tons) when at the surface and 871 tonnes (857 long tons) while submerged. She had a total length of 67.10 m (220 ft 2 in), a pressure hull length of 50.50 m (165 ft 8 in), a beam of 6.20 m (20 ft 4 in), a height of 9.60 m (31 ft 6 in), and a draught of 4.74 m (15 ft 7 in). The submarine was powered by two Germaniawerft F46 four-stroke, six-cylinder supercharged diesel engines producing a total of 2,800 to 3,200 metric horsepower (2,060 to 2,350 kW; 2,760 to 3,160 shp) for use while surfaced, two Siemens-Schuckert GU 343/38–8 double-acting electric motors producing a total of 750 metric horsepower (550 kW; 740 shp) for use while submerged. She had two shafts and two 1.23 m (4 ft) propellers. The boat was capable of operating at depths of up to 230 metres (750 ft).

The submarine had a maximum surface speed of 17.7 knots (32.8 km/h; 20.4 mph) and a maximum submerged speed of 7.6 knots (14.1 km/h; 8.7 mph). When submerged, the boat could operate for 80 nautical miles (150 km; 92 mi) at 4 knots (7.4 km/h; 4.6 mph); when surfaced, she could travel 8,500 nautical miles (15,700 km; 9,800 mi) at 10 knots (19 km/h; 12 mph). U-470 was fitted with five 53.3 cm (21 in) torpedo tubes (four fitted at the bow and one at the stern), fourteen torpedoes, one 8.8 cm (3.46 in) SK C/35 naval gun, 220 rounds, and one twin 2 cm (0.79 in) C/30 anti-aircraft gun. The boat had a complement of between forty-four and sixty.

== Service history ==
Built by the Deutsche Werke shipyards in Kiel, U-470 took a long time to complete, not being ready for initial working-up operations until a year after her construction began. She was given to Oberleutnant zur See Günther-Paul Grave, a highly experienced submarine officer, who led her through her training and mechanical trials and readied the boat for her active career, a difficult six month process.

=== War Patrol ===
U-470's only war patrol was an unlucky affair. After a difficult passage round the British Isles, U-470 received orders to join U-844 and U-964 to form a wolfpack to attack Convoy ON 206 in the Western Approaches to the English Channel. On 16 October, just 18 days after she left Bergen in Norway, a patrolling aircraft spotted U-470 on the surface. A total of three British Royal Air Force B-24 Liberator bombers from 59 and 120 Squadrons soon swarmed U-470. The captain decided to battle it out on the surface rather than dive, which would have made the submarine an easy target for depth charges.

=== Fate ===
Over the course of the next several hours, the Liberators attacked the submarine with nearly 30 depth charges. Eventually damage was so severe that an abandon ship order was given. It came too late, as U-470 quickly sank with 46 hands including the captain. Two survivors were picked up. Initially there was a reported 15 survivors in the water, but many of them did not find buoyancy supports and drowned over the next few hours.

=== Wolfpacks ===
U-470 took part in one wolfpack, namely:

- Schlieffen (14 – 16 October 1943)

== Bibliography ==
- Busch, Rainer; Röll, Hans-Joachim (1999). German U-boat commanders of World War II : a biographical dictionary. Translated by Brooks, Geoffrey. London, Annapolis, Md: Greenhill Books, Naval Institute Press. ISBN 1-55750-186-6.
- Busch, Rainer; Röll, Hans-Joachim (1999). Der U-Boot-Krieg, 1939-1945: Deutsche U-Boot-Verluste von September 1939 bis Mai 1945 [German U-boat losses from September 1939 to May 1945] (in German). Vol. IV. Hamburg, Berlin, Bonn: Mittler. ISBN 3-8132-0514-2.
- Gröner, Eric; Jung, Dieter; Maass, Martin (1991). German Warships 1815-1945: U-boats and Mine Warfare Vessels. Vol. 2. Translated by Thomas, Keith; Magowan, Rachel. London: Conway Maritime Press. ISBN 0-85177-593-4.
- Sharpe, Peter (1998). U-Boat Fact File. Great Britain: Midland Publishing. ISBN 1-85780-072-9.
- Kemp, Paul (1999). U-Boats Destroyed - German Submarine Losses in the World Wars. London: Arms & Armour. ISBN 1-85409-515-3.
