= German submarine U-844 =

German World War II submarine

Coordinates: 58°30′N 27°16′W

History

Nazi Germany
- Name: U-844
- Ordered: 20 January 1941
- Builder: DeSchiMAG AG Weser, Bremen
- Yard number: 1050
- Laid down: 21 May 1942
- Launched: 30 December 1942
- Commissioned: 7 April 1943
- Fate: Sunk by aircraft on 16 October 1943

General characteristics
- Class & type: Type IXC/40 submarine
- Displacement: 1,144 t (1,126 long tons) surfaced; 1,257 t (1,237 long tons) submerged
- Length: 76.76 m (251 ft 10 in) o/a; 58.75 m (192 ft 9 in) pressure hull
- Beam: 6.86 m (22 ft 6 in) o/a; 4.44 m (14 ft 7 in) pressure hull
- Height: 9.60 m (31 ft 6 in)
- Draught: 4.67 m (15 ft 4 in)
- Installed power: 4,400 PS (3,200 kW; 4,300 bhp) (diesels); 1,000 PS (740 kW; 990 shp) (electric)
- Propulsion: 2 shafts; 2 × diesel engines; 2 × electric motors
- Speed: 18.3 knots (33.9 km/h; 21.1 mph) surfaced; 7.3 knots (13.5 km/h; 8.4 mph) submerged
- Range: 13,850 nmi (25,650 km; 15,940 mi) at 10 knots (19 km/h; 12 mph) surfaced; 63 nmi (117 km; 72 mi) at 4 knots (7.4 km/h; 4.6 mph) submerged
- Test depth: 230 m (750 ft)
- Complement: 4 officers, 44 enlisted
- Armament: 6 × torpedo tubes (4 bow, 2 stern); 22 × 53.3 cm (21 in) torpedoes; 1 × 10.5 cm (4.1 in) SK C/32 deck gun (180 rounds); 1 × 3.7 cm (1.5 in) SK C/30 AA gun; 1 × twin 2 cm FlaK 30 AA guns

Service record
- Part of: 4th U-boat Flotilla; 7 April – 30 September 1943; 10th U-boat Flotilla; 1 – 16 October 1943
- Identification codes: M 51 391
- Commanders: Oblt.z.S. Günther Möller; 7 April – 16 October 1943
- Operations: 1 patrol: 6 – 16 October 1943
- Victories: None

German submarine U-844 was a Type IXC/40 U-boat of Nazi Germany's Kriegsmarine, built for service during the Second World War. An extremely short-lived boat, U-844 served just ten days on her only patrol and was sunk with two other boats whilst preparing for a failed attack on a well-defended convoy within range of allied air support.

== Design ==
German Type IXC/40 submarines were slightly larger than the original Type IXCs. U-844 had a displacement of 1,144 tonnes (1,126 long tons) when at the surface and 1,257 tonnes (1,237 long tons) while submerged. The U-boat had a total length of 76.76 m (251 ft 10 in), a pressure hull length of 58.75 m (192 ft 9 in), a beam of 6.86 m (22 ft 6 in), a height of 9.60 m (31 ft 6 in), and a draught of 4.67 m (15 ft 4 in). The submarine was powered by two MAN M 9 V 40/46 supercharged four-stroke, nine-cylinder diesel engines producing a total of 4,400 metric horsepower (3,240 kW; 4,340 shp) for use while surfaced, two Siemens-Schuckert 2 GU 345/34 double-acting electric motors producing a total of 1,000 shaft horsepower (1,010 PS; 750 kW) for use while submerged. She had two shafts and two 1.92 m (6 ft) propellers. The boat was capable of operating at depths of up to 230 metres (750 ft).

The submarine had a maximum surface speed of 18.3 knots (33.9 km/h; 21.1 mph) and a maximum submerged speed of 7.3 knots (13.5 km/h; 8.4 mph). When submerged, the boat could operate for 63 nautical miles (117 km; 72 mi) at 4 knots (7.4 km/h; 4.6 mph); when surfaced, she could travel 13,850 nautical miles (25,650 km; 15,940 mi) at 10 knots (19 km/h; 12 mph). U-844 was fitted with six 53.3 cm (21 in) torpedo tubes (four fitted at the bow and two at the stern), 22 torpedoes, one 10.5 cm (4.13 in) SK C/32 naval gun, 180 rounds, and a 3.7 cm (1.5 in) SK C/30 as well as a 2 cm (0.79 in) C/30 anti-aircraft gun. The boat had a complement of forty-eight.

== Service history ==
Built by the large DeSchiMAG AG Weser shipyards in Bremen, U-844 was rapidly completed and readied for service, her entire building program taking just under a year. Given to Oberleutnant zur See Günther Möller, she passed her initial working-up and training schedule well, and was dispatched to her first patrol in the Atlantic Ocean in the first week of October 1943 to try to stem the terrible losses being incurred by U-boats at this time.

=== War Patrol ===
Ten days after her departure whilst she sailed south of Iceland she received orders to attach herself to U-470 and U-964 and to proceed southwards to attack Convoy ON 206 in the North Atlantic. The boats had to travel on the surface to have any hope of reaching their target, and it was this which caused disaster, as the three submarines were spotted in broad daylight by an RAF B-24 Liberator aircraft, which rapidly called allies in the form of more Liberators from 59 Squadron and 86 Squadron Royal Air Force amongst other forces.

=== Fate ===
On 16 October 1943, during the day-long battle which followed, the anti-aircraft weapons of the boats were brought into use, downing two Liberators and killing a number of crewmen. It was not however enough to stave off the inevitable, and one by one the boats were separated and sunk, having been prevented from diving by constant attention from Allied aircraft. U-844 was eventually lost to a direct hit from a bomb dropped by a Liberator, the boat blowing to pieces and killing all 53 of her crew.

=== Wolfpacks ===
U-844 took part in one wolfpack, namely:

- Schlieffen (16 October 1943)

== Bibliography ==
- Busch, Rainer; Röll, Hans-Joachim (1999). German U-boat commanders of World War II : a biographical dictionary. Translated by Brooks, Geoffrey. London, Annapolis, Md: Greenhill Books, Naval Institute Press. ISBN 1-55750-186-6.
- Busch, Rainer; Röll, Hans-Joachim (1999). Der U-Boot-Krieg, 1939-1945: Deutsche U-Boot-Verluste von September 1939 bis Mai 1945 [German U-boat losses from September 1939 to May 1945] (in German). Vol. IV. Hamburg, Berlin, Bonn: Mittler. ISBN 3-8132-0514-2.
- Gröner, Eric; Jung, Dieter; Maass, Martin (1991). German Warships 1815-1945: U-boats and Mine Warfare Vessels. Vol. 2. Translated by Thomas, Keith; Magowan, Rachel. London: Conway Maritime Press. ISBN 0-85177-593-4.
- Sharpe, Peter (1998). U-Boat Fact File. Great Britain: Midland Publishing. ISBN 1-85780-072-9.
