= German submarine U-841 =

German World War II submarine

History

Nazi Germany
- Name: U-841
- Ordered: 20 January 1941
- Builder: DeSchiMAG AG Weser, Bremen
- Yard number: 1047
- Laid down: 21 March 1942
- Launched: 21 October 1942
- Commissioned: 6 February 1943
- Fate: Scuttled off Cape Farewell on 17 October 1943 at 59°57′N 31°6′W

General characteristics
- Class & type: Type IXC/40 submarine
- Displacement: 1,144 t (1,126 long tons) surfaced; 1,257 t (1,237 long tons) submerged
- Length: 76.76 m (251 ft 10 in) o/a; 58.75 m (192 ft 9 in) pressure hull
- Beam: 6.86 m (22 ft 6 in) o/a; 4.44 m (14 ft 7 in) pressure hull
- Height: 9.60 m (31 ft 6 in)
- Draught: 4.67 m (15 ft 4 in)
- Installed power: 4,400 PS (3,200 kW; 4,300 bhp) (diesels); 1,000 PS (740 kW; 990 shp) (electric)
- Propulsion: 2 shafts; 2 × diesel engines; 2 × electric motors
- Speed: 19 knots (35 km/h; 22 mph) surfaced; 7.3 knots (13.5 km/h; 8.4 mph) submerged
- Range: 13,850 nmi (25,650 km; 15,940 mi) at 10 knots (19 km/h; 12 mph) surfaced; 63 nmi (117 km; 72 mi) at 4 knots (7.4 km/h; 4.6 mph) submerged
- Test depth: 230 m (750 ft)
- Complement: 4 officers, 44 enlisted
- Armament: 6 × torpedo tubes (4 bow, 2 stern); 22 × 53.3 cm (21 in) torpedoes; 1 × 10.5 cm (4.1 in) SK C/32 deck gun (180 rounds); 1 × 3.7 cm (1.5 in) SK C/30 AA gun; 1 × twin 2 cm FlaK 30 AA guns

Service record
- Part of: 4th U-boat Flotilla; 6 February – 30 June 1943; 2nd U-boat Flotilla; 1 July – 17 October 1943
- Identification codes: M 49 972
- Commanders: Oblt.z.S. / Kptlt. Werner Bender; 6 February – 17 October 1943
- Operations: 1 patrol: 4 – 17 October 1943
- Victories: None

German submarine U-841 was a Type IXC/40 U-boat built for Nazi Germany's Kriegsmarine during World War II.

U-841 was ordered on 20 January 1941 from DeSchiMAG AG Weser in Bremen under the yard number 1047. Her keel was laid down on 21 March 1942 and after seven months of construction the U-boat was launched on 21 October 1942. On 6 February 1943 she was commissioned into service under the command of Oberleutnant zur See Werner Bender (Crew 36) in the 4th U-boat Flotilla.

A submarine U-841 appeared in the fictional 1970 film The McKenzie Break, rescuing German submariner escapees from a British prisoner-of-war camp.

== Design ==
German Type IXC/40 submarines were slightly larger than the original Type IXCs. U-841 had a displacement of 1,144 tonnes (1,126 long tons) when at the surface and 1,257 tonnes (1,237 long tons) while submerged. The U-boat had a total length of 76.76 m (251 ft 10 in), a pressure hull length of 58.75 m (192 ft 9 in), a beam of 6.86 m (22 ft 6 in), a height of 9.60 m (31 ft 6 in), and a draught of 4.67 m (15 ft 4 in). The submarine was powered by two MAN M 9 V 40/46 supercharged four-stroke, nine-cylinder diesel engines producing a total of 4,400 metric horsepower (3,240 kW; 4,340 shp) for use while surfaced, two Siemens-Schuckert 2 GU 345/34 double-acting electric motors producing a total of 1,000 shaft horsepower (1,010 PS; 750 kW) for use while submerged. She had two shafts and two 1.92 m (6 ft) propellers. The boat was capable of operating at depths of up to 230 metres (750 ft).

The submarine had a maximum surface speed of 18.3 knots (33.9 km/h; 21.1 mph) and a maximum submerged speed of 7.3 knots (13.5 km/h; 8.4 mph). When submerged, the boat could operate for 63 nautical miles (117 km; 72 mi) at 4 knots (7.4 km/h; 4.6 mph); when surfaced, she could travel 13,850 nautical miles (25,650 km; 15,940 mi) at 10 knots (19 km/h; 12 mph). U-841 was fitted with six 53.3 cm (21 in) torpedo tubes (four fitted at the bow and two at the stern), 22 torpedoes, one 10.5 cm (4.13 in) SK C/32 naval gun, 180 rounds, and a 3.7 cm (1.5 in) SK C/30 as well as a 2 cm (0.79 in) C/30 anti-aircraft gun. The boat had a complement of forty-eight.

== Service history ==
Transferred to 2nd U-boat Flotilla, U-841 left Kiel for Bergen on 26 August 1943 arriving there six days later. On 9 September 1943 she left Bergen for operations in the North Atlantic. Stopping over in Trondheim, she joined wolfpack Schlieffen operating against convoy ONS 20 in October 1943. In the afternoon of 17 October 1943, U-841 was spotted and attacked by an aircraft from 120 Squadron, RAF. One of ONS 20's escorts, HMS Byard, picked up U-841 on its ASDIC later that day and depth-charged it. Heavily damaged, the U-boat surfaced and was scuttled by its crew. While the crew abandoned ship, Byard opened fire on the U-boat. 27 crew members, including the captain, died, while 27 survivors were picked up.

== Bibliography ==
- Busch, Rainer; Röll, Hans-Joachim (1999). German U-boat commanders of World War II : a biographical dictionary. Translated by Brooks, Geoffrey. London, Annapolis, Md: Greenhill Books, Naval Institute Press. ISBN 1-55750-186-6.
- Busch, Rainer; Röll, Hans-Joachim (1999b). Der U-Boot-Krieg, 1939-1945: Deutsche U-Boot-Verluste von September 1939 bis Mai 1945 [German U-boat losses from September 1939 to May 1945] (in German). Vol. IV. Hamburg, Berlin, Bonn: Mittler. ISBN 3-8132-0514-2.
- Gröner, Eric; Jung, Dieter; Maass, Martin (1991). German Warships 1815-1945: U-boats and Mine Warfare Vessels. Vol. 2. Translated by Thomas, Keith; Magowan, Rachel. London: Conway Maritime Press. ISBN 0-85177-593-4.
