= No. 120 Squadron RAF =

Flying squadron of the Royal Air Force

- Squadron badge
- Active: 1 January 1918 – 1 April 1918 (RFC); 1 April 1918 – 21 October 1919 (RAF); 2 June 1941 – 4 June 1945; 1 October 1946 – 26 May 2011; 1 April 2018 – present
- Country: United Kingdom
- Branch: Royal Air Force
- Type: Flying squadron
- Role: Anti-submarine warfare, anti-surface warfare and maritime patrol aircraft
- Part of: No. 1 Group
- Home station: RAF Lossiemouth
- Motto: Endurance
- Equipment: Boeing Poseidon MRA1
- Battle honours: Atlantic 1941–1945*; Biscay 1941–1944*; Arctic 1942–1944*; Channel and North Sea 1941–1944*; South Atlantic 1982; Gulf 1991; Iraq 2003; Iraq 2003-2011; Afghanistan 2001–2014; * Honours marked with an asterisk are those emblazoned on the Squadron Standard

Insignia
- Squadron badge heraldry: Standing on a demi-terrestrial globe, a falcon close. The falcon, an Icelandic falcon, commemorates the squadron's stay there and also indicates the squadron's predatory instinct.
- Squadron codes: OH (Jun 1941 – Dec 1941, Jul 1944 – Jun 1945); BS (Oct 1946 – Mar 1951) (Codes taken over from No. 160 Sqn); A (Mar 1951 – Apr 1956); 120 (Apr 1956 – Feb 1971?)

Number 120 Squadron or No. CXX Squadron is a squadron of the Royal Air Force which was established as a Royal Flying Corps unit late in World War I, disbanded a year after the end of the war, then re-established as an RAF Coastal Command squadron during World War II. Although disbanded again a month after Victory in Europe Day, during and after World War II it operated almost continuously, with maritime patrol aircraft; most recently with the Hawker Siddeley Nimrod, based at RAF Kinloss in Scotland until the type's withdrawal in March 2010. The squadron was disbanded again the following year. No. 120 Squadron stood up again in April 2018 at RAF Lossiemouth and became the first squadron to be equipped with the Boeing Poseidon MRA1 anti-submarine warfare (ASW) aircraft on 31 October 2019.

== History ==
=== Formation in First World War ===
No. 120 Squadron of the Royal Flying Corps was formed at Cramlington on 1 January 1918, as a day bomber unit and was planned to be equipped with Airco DH.9. The First World War ended before it became operational, as the DH.9s were not delivered until October 1918, so No. 120 Squadron spent late 1918 and 1919 flying communication and mail flights in Western Europe until it was disbanded on 21 October 1919.

=== Second World War ===
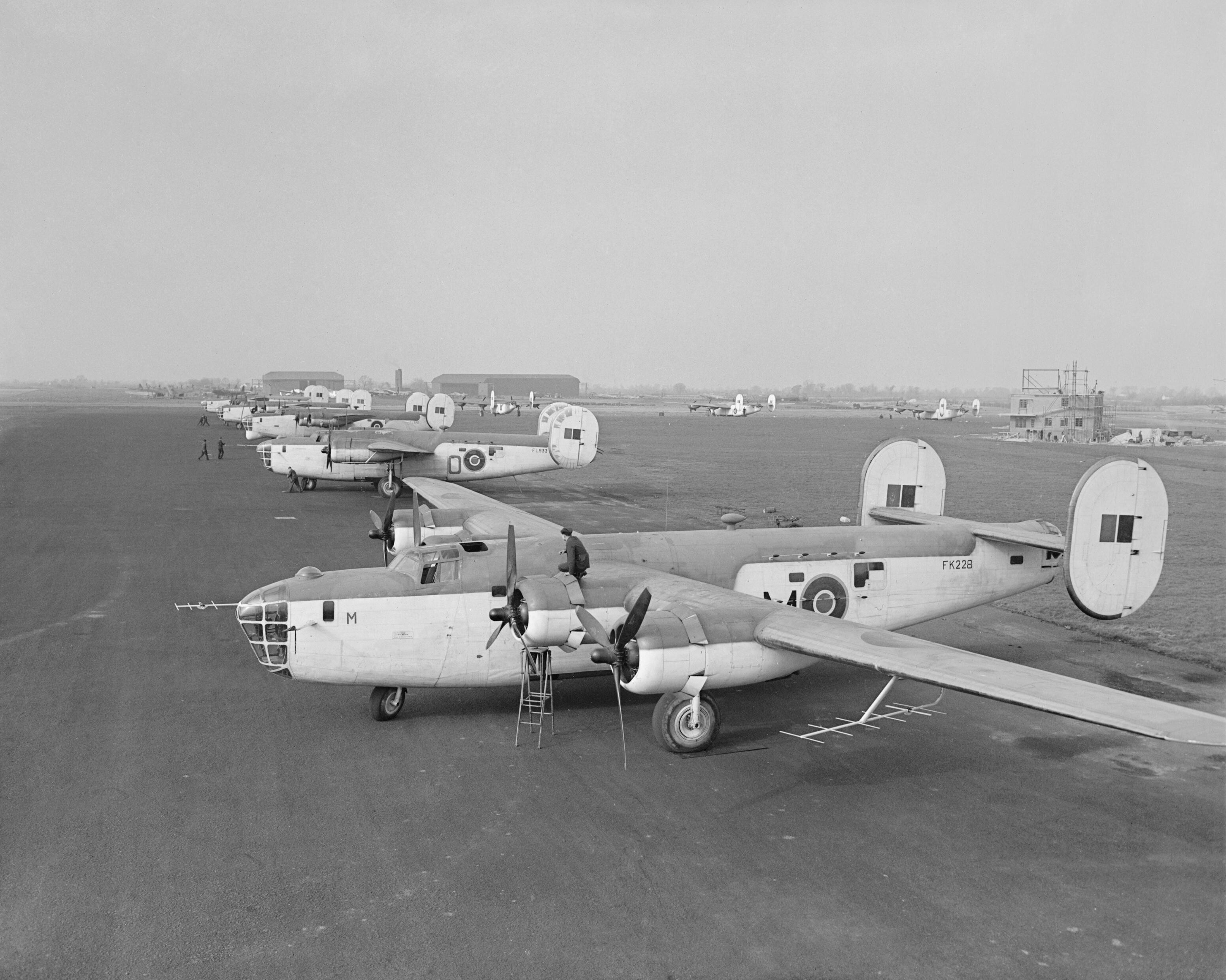
Liberator Mk.IIIs of No. 120 Squadron at RAF Aldergrove, 1943.

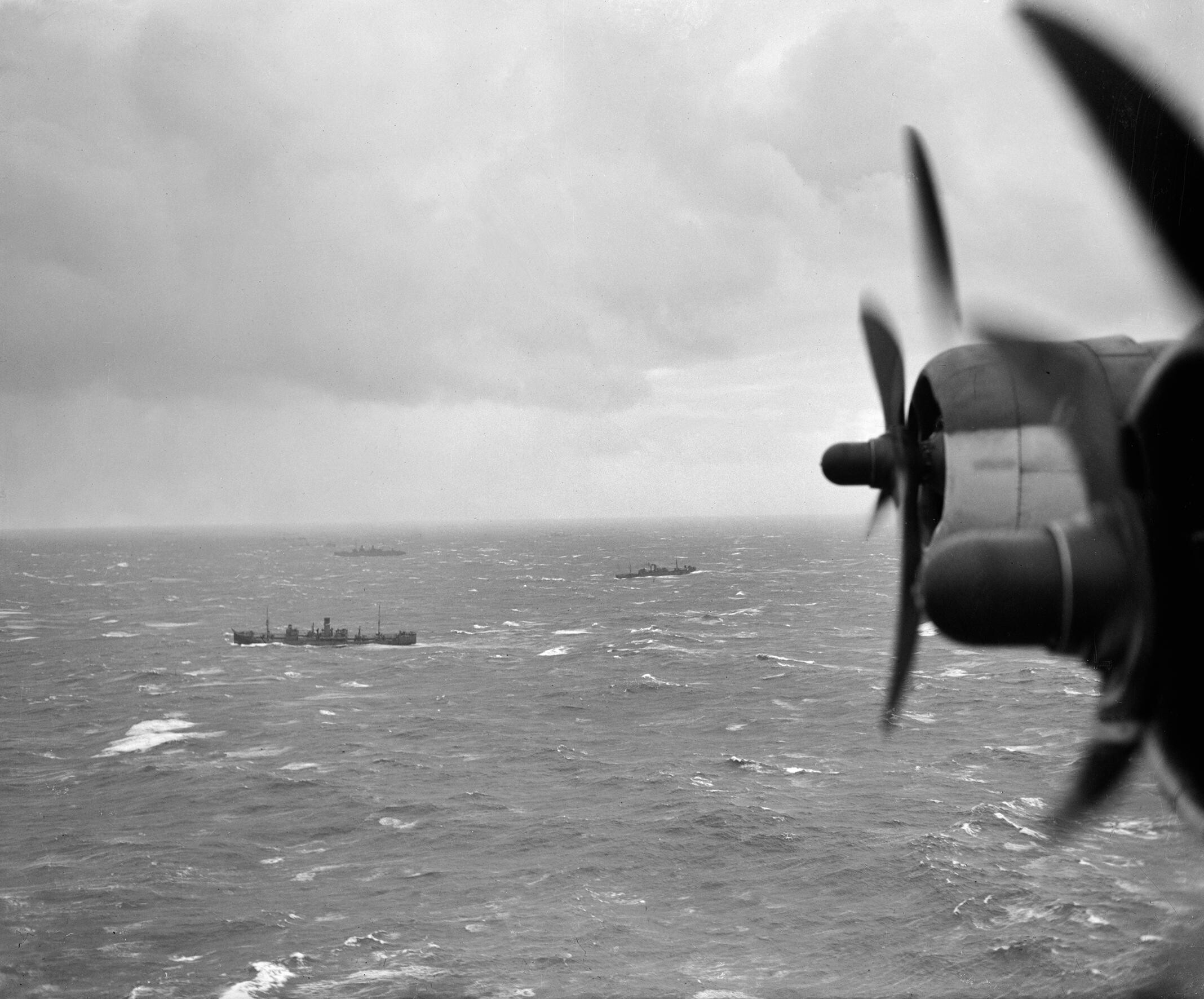
A No. CXX Squadron Liberator on patrol during the Second World War.

The squadron reformed as part of Coastal Command in Northern Ireland on 2 June 1941 at RAF Nutts Corner, the unit was equipped with the Consolidated Liberator, flying against the U-boat threat in the war in the North Atlantic. The squadron received the first Mark I Liberators in June and began flying nine of them in September from RAF Aldergrove, Northern Ireland and RAF Reykjavik, Iceland. The number of Liberators in September 1942 had increased to six Mark I, two Mark II, and three Mark III. No. 120 Squadron remained the only Coastal Command squadron flying VLR (Very Long Range) Liberators in February 1943 with five Mark I and twelve Mark III.

No. 120 squadron was very successful in this role, sinking 14 U-boats outright; and was credited with a share in sinking three more, plus eight damaged. This was the highest kill total in Coastal Command, achieved while flying from Northern Ireland, Iceland, and in support of Operation Overlord – the Allied invasion of France in 1944.

- 12 October 1942 – U-597 sunk by depth charges from Liberator H piloted by Squadron Leader Terry Bulloch.
- 15 October 1942 – (U-661 credited to Liberator H but postwar analysis indicates an attack on U-615 caused no damage)
- 5 November 1942 – U-89 damaged near convoy SC 107 (but initially believed to have sunk U-132)
- 8 December 1942 – (U-254 credited but postwar evidence indicates sank in collision with U-221 near convoy HX 217)
- 10 December 1942 – U-611 sunk near convoy HX 217 by depth charges from Liberator B
- 8 February 1943 – U-135 damaged near convoy SC 118
- 15 February 1943 – U-225 sunk by Liberator S near convoy SC 119 (but initially believed to be U-529)
- 21 February 1943 – U-623 sunk near convoy ON 166 by Liberator T
- 5 April 1943 – U-635 sunk near convoy HX 231 by depth charges from Liberator N
- 5 April 1943 – U-594 damaged near convoy HX 231
- 23 April 1943 – U-189 sunk by Liberator V
- 19 May 1943 – (U-954 credited to Liberator T, but postwar assessment indicates an attack on U-731 caused no damage)
- 20 May 1943 – U-258 sunk near convoy SC 130 by depth charges from Liberator P
- 28 May 1943 – U-304 sunk by depth charges from Liberator E
- 25 June 1943 – U-200 sunk by Liberator H (but initially believed to be U-194)
- 20 September 1943 – (U-338 credited to Liberator F, but postwar analysis indicates an attack on U-386 caused no damage)
- 4 October 1943 – U-389 sunk by depth charges from Liberator X (but initially believed to be U-279)
- 8 October 1943 – U-643 sunk near convoy SC 143 in cooperation with No. 86 Squadron
- 16 October 1943 – U-470 sunk near convoys ONS 20/ON 206 by Liberator Z in cooperation with No. 59 Squadron
- 17 October 1943 – U-540 sunk near convoys ONS 20/ON 206 by depth charges from Liberator H in cooperation with No. 59 Squadron
- 6 March 1944 – U-737 damaged by depth charges
- 9 June 1944 – U-740 credited but postwar assessment indicates damaged but not sunk
- 29 April 1945 – U-1017 sunk by depth charges from Liberator Q

After the war against Nazi Germany ended in May 1945, the squadron was disbanded on 4 June 1945 at RAF Ballykelly.

=== Cold War to 2011 ===
The squadron was re-established on 1 October 1946, by renumbering No. 160 Squadron at RAF Leuchars, Fife. It was equipped with Avro Lancaster GR.3s, although some Liberators remained on strength until June 1947. A detachment of the squadron moved to Palestine in November 1947, where it carried out searches for illegal immigrant ships until February 1948, when it returned to Britain.

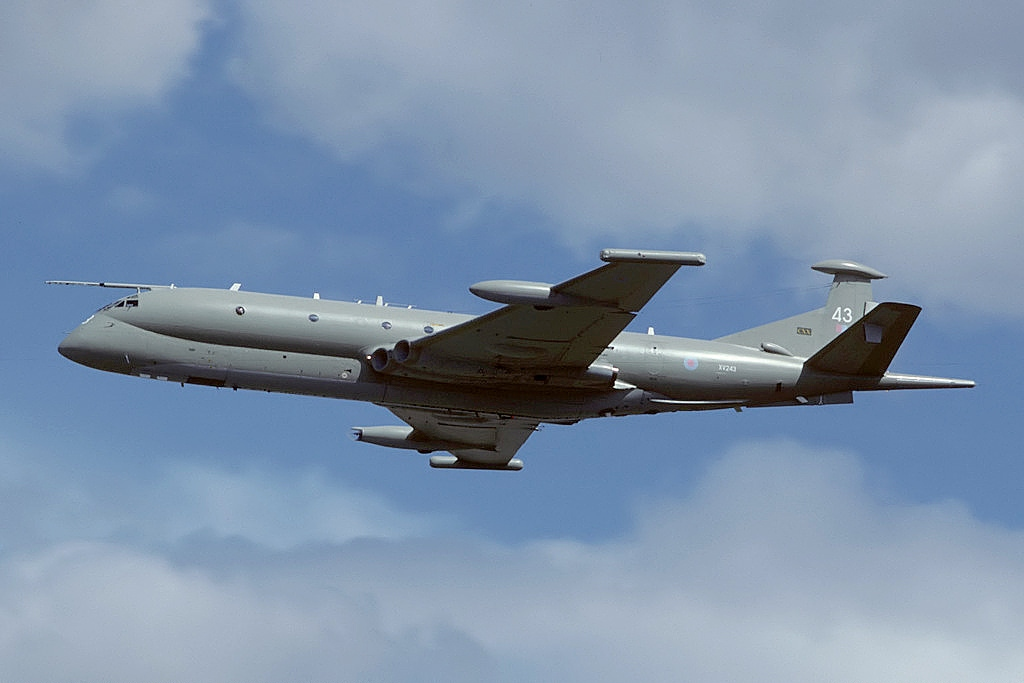
Nimrod MR.2 XV243 of No. 120 Squadron in 1993.

The squadron re-equipped with Avro Shackleton MR.1s in April 1951. No. CXX Squadron was awarded its Standard on 15 January 1952 by King George VI, despite not having accrued the required 25 years of service. It is one of two squadrons to have this honour – the other being No. 617 (Dambusters) Squadron. The squadron began operating from its new base RAF Kinloss, Moray, on 1 April 1959. It continued operating the MR.2 and MR.3 versions of the Shackleton in the maritime patrol role until February 1971.

In October 1970, No. 120 Squadron began to re-equipped with Hawker Siddeley Nimrod MR.1. In 1973, the squadron flew sorties during the Second Cod War with Iceland. On 1 April 1979, a Nimrod MR.1 from No. CXX Squadron became the last British military aircraft to depart from RAF Luqa, Malta.

In April 1981, No. 120 Squadron started to receive the updated Nimrod MR.2. In 1982, the squadron was the first Nimrod MR.2 unit to arrive at Wideawake Airfield on Ascension Island, from where it operated during the Falklands War. On 18 November 1983, a crew from the squadron made the first direct Falkland Islands to United Kingdom flight in 18 hours and 15 minutes. On 12 August 1990, the squadron deployed to Seeb International Airport, Oman, before participating in Operation Granby the following year.

On 31 March 2010, the Nimrod MR.2 was withdrawn from service, and the squadron formally disbanded on 26 May 2011.

=== Poseidon (2019–present) ===
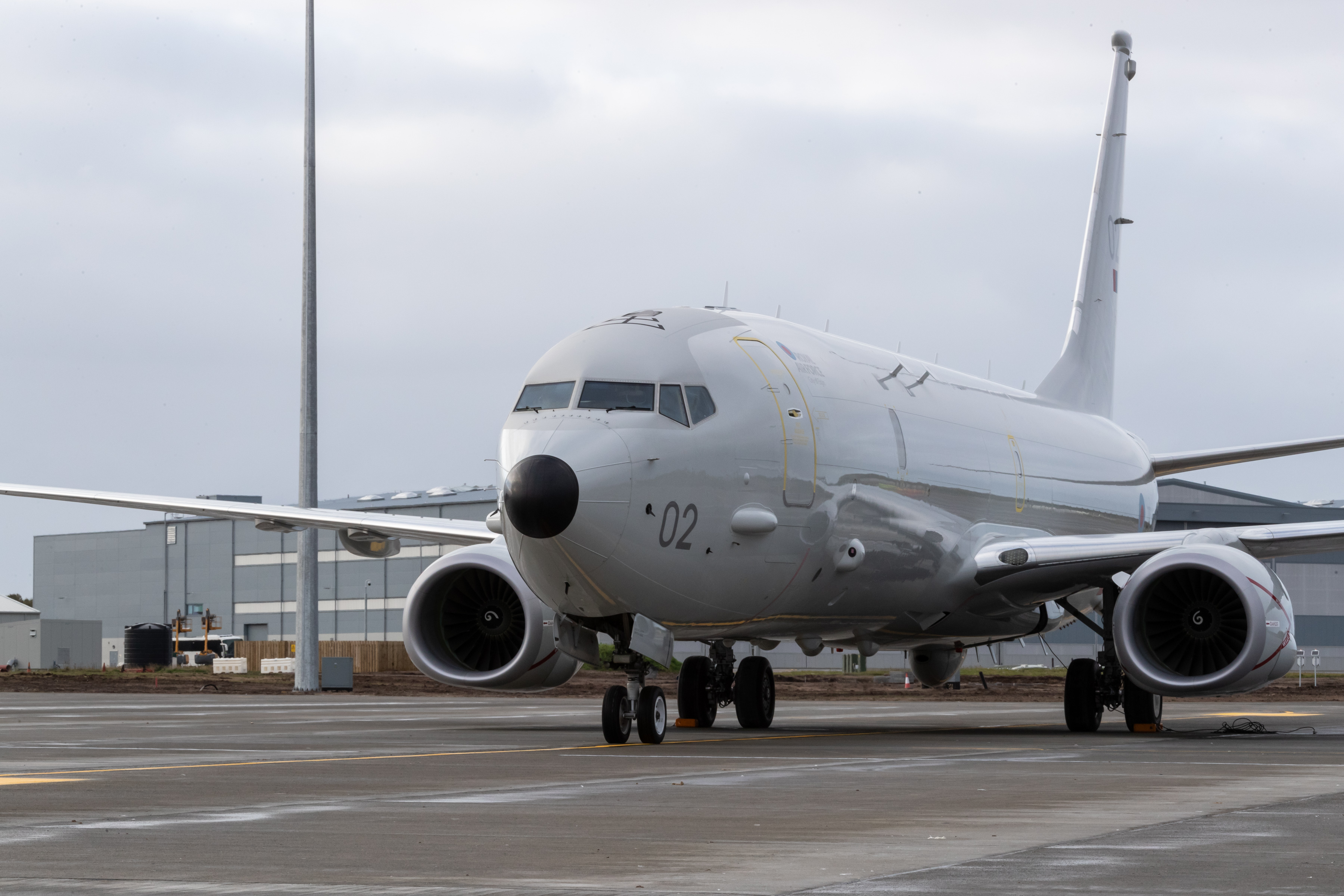
Poseidon ZP802 arrives at Lossiemouth on 13 October 2020

In July 2017, it was announced that No. 120 Squadron would be the first RAF squadron to fly the Boeing P-8A Poseidon, based at RAF Lossiemouth. No. CXX Squadron reformed on 1 April 2018. The first Poseidon MRA1 (ZP801) was delivered to the squadron at NAS Jacksonville, Florida, on 31 October 2019. ZP801, now named Pride of Moray, flew into Kinloss Barracks on 4 February 2020. ZP802 was delivered to Kinloss on 13 March 2020. The RAF declared the Poseidon MRA1s combat ready on 1 April 2020. On 3 August 2020, No. 120 Squadron carried out their first operational mission with the P-8A, when ZP801 shadowed the Russian warship Vasily Bykov in the North Sea. The two Poseidons at Kinloss moved to their permanent home of RAF Lossiemouth in October 2020, after works to accommodate the P-8As were completed. ZP803 was the first to be delivered to RAF Lossiemouth, arriving on 14 October 2020. Poseidon MRA1 ZP804 was delivered on 3 November 2020. On 2 February 2021, ZP805 was delivered to RAF Lossiemouth having flown direct from Boeing Field, Washington, in just over eight hours. By November 2021, eight of nine aircraft had been delivered to RAF Lossiemouth and the final aircraft arrived in January 2022.

== Aircraft operated ==
- Airco DH.9 (Nov 1918 – Oct 1919)
- Consolidated Liberator I (June 1941 – Dec 1943)
- Consolidated Liberator II (Nov 1941 – Oct 1942)
- Consolidated Liberator III (July 1942 – Jan 1944)
- Consolidated Liberator IV (Dec 1943 – Jan 1945)
- Consolidated Liberator VI (Dec 1944 – June 1945)
- Consolidated Liberator VIII (Dec 1944 – June 1945)
- Avro Lancaster ASR.3 (Nov 1946 – Apr 1951)
- Avro Lancaster GR.3 (Nov 1946 – Apr 1951)
- Avro Shackleton MR.1 (Mar 1951 – Oct 1956)
- Avro Shackleton MR.2 (Apr 1953 – Aug 1954; Oct 1956 – Nov 1958)
- Avro Shackleton MR.3 (Sep 1958 – Feb 1971)
- Hawker Siddeley Nimrod MR.1 (Oct 1970 – Feb 1982)
- Hawker Siddeley Nimrod MR.2 (Apr 1981 – Mar 2010)
- Boeing Poseidon MRA1 (Oct 2019 – present)

== Poseidon names ==
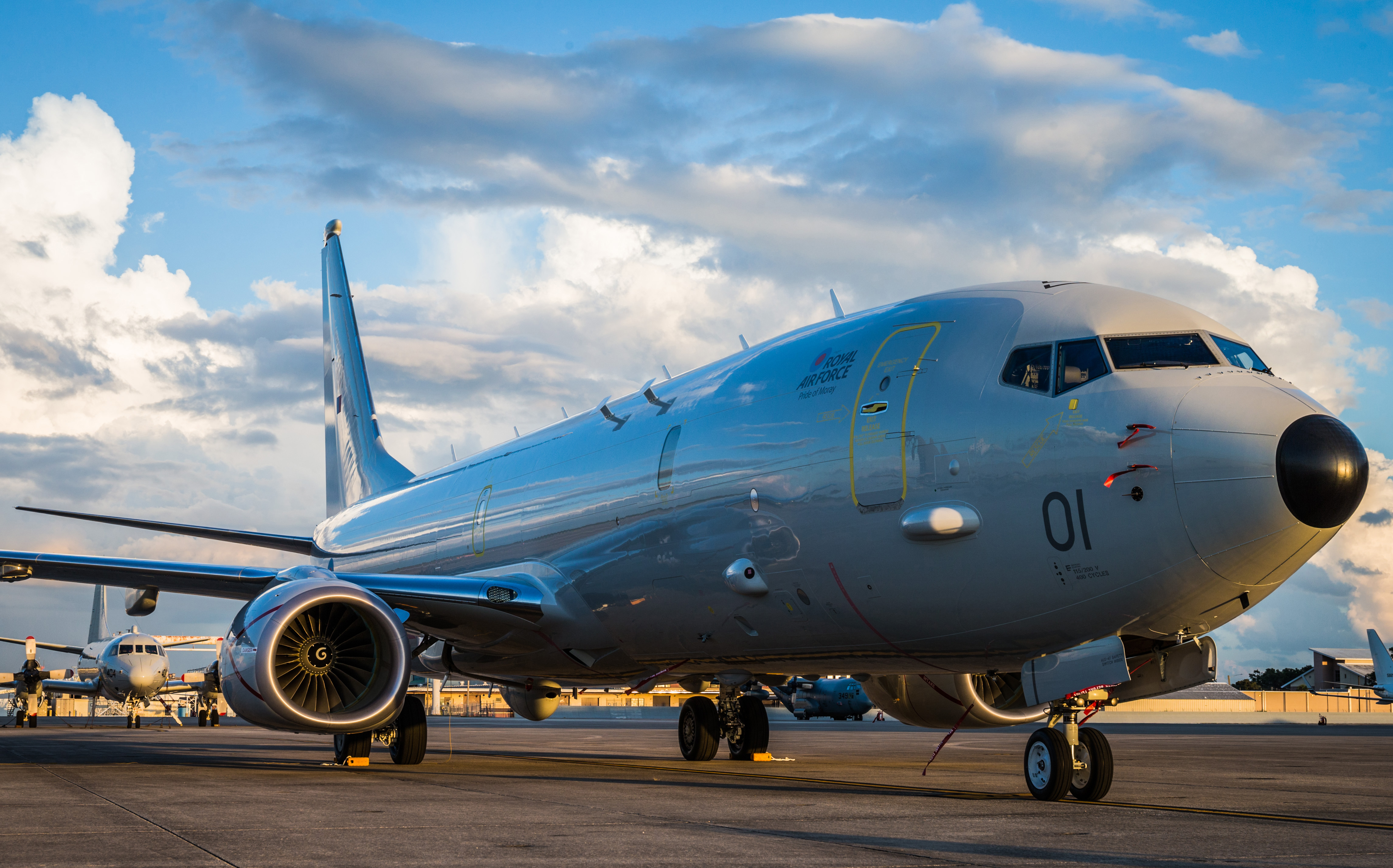
Poseidon MRA1 ZP801 (Pride of Moray) at NAS Jacksonville, Florida, on 31 October 2019.

The RAF's Poseidon MRA1 fleet are being given names:

- ZP801 – Pride of Moray
- ZP802 – City of Elgin
- ZP803 – Terence Bulloch DSO* DFC*
- ZP804 – Spirit of Reykjavík
- ZP805 – Fulmar
- ZP806 – Guernsey's Reply
- ZP807 – William Barker VC

== See also ==
- List of Royal Air Force aircraft squadrons
- Armed forces in Scotland
- Military history of Scotland
