= German submarine U-964 =

German World War II submarine

Coordinates: 57°27′N 28°17′W

History

Nazi Germany
- Name: U-964
- Ordered: 5 June 1941
- Builder: Blohm & Voss, Hamburg
- Yard number: 164
- Laid down: 20 April 1942
- Launched: 30 December 1942
- Commissioned: 18 February 1943
- Fate: Sunk on 16 October 1943

General characteristics
- Class & type: Type VIIC submarine
- Displacement: 769 tonnes (757 long tons) surfaced; 871 t (857 long tons) submerged
- Length: 67.10 m (220 ft 2 in) o/a; 50.50 m (165 ft 8 in) pressure hull
- Beam: 6.20 m (20 ft 4 in) o/a; 4.70 m (15 ft 5 in) pressure hull
- Height: 9.60 m (31 ft 6 in)
- Draught: 4.74 m (15 ft 7 in)
- Installed power: 2,800–3,200 PS (2,100–2,400 kW; 2,800–3,200 bhp) (diesels); 750 PS (550 kW; 740 shp) (electric)
- Propulsion: 2 shafts; 2 × diesel engines; 2 × electric motors
- Speed: 17.7 knots (32.8 km/h; 20.4 mph) surfaced; 7.6 knots (14.1 km/h; 8.7 mph) submerged
- Range: 8,500 nmi (15,700 km; 9,800 mi) at 10 knots (19 km/h; 12 mph) surfaced; 80 nmi (150 km; 92 mi) at 4 knots (7.4 km/h; 4.6 mph) submerged
- Test depth: 230 m (750 ft); Crush depth: 250–295 m (820–968 ft)
- Complement: 4 officers, 40–56 enlisted
- Armament: 5 × 53.3 cm (21 in) torpedo tubes (four bow, one stern); 14 × torpedoes or 26 TMA mines; 1 × 8.8 cm (3.46 in) deck gun (220 rounds); 1 × twin 2 cm (0.79 in) C/30 anti-aircraft gun

Service record
- Part of: 5th U-boat Flotilla; 18 February – 30 September 1943; 6th U-boat Flotilla; 1 – 16 October 1943
- Identification codes: M 50 718
- Commanders: Oblt.z.S. Emmo Hummerjohann; 18 February – 16 October 1943
- Operations: 1 patrol: 5 – 16 October 1943
- Victories: None

German submarine U-964 was a Type VIIC U-boat of Nazi Germany's Kriegsmarine built for service during World War II. A short-lived boat, U-964 is most noted for being one of three new boats ordered by the Kriegsmarine to attack Convoy ON 206 in the Western Approaches. To do this, the three boats had to travel a long distance on the surface during daylight hours in a region patrolled by Allied aircraft. This had fatal consequences for all U-boats involved.

U-964 was built by the Blohm & Voss shipyards in Hamburg during 1942 as a Type VIIC boat designed to fight in the waters of the Northern Atlantic Ocean. Her construction was rapid and smooth, and following her completion in February 1943 she was taken for training and working-up patrols in the Baltic Sea and off the Norwegian coast. Her commander during this period was veteran submariner Oberleutnant zur See Emmo Hummerjohann, who was experienced in combat operations and was still in charge when she departed Bergen, Norway in early October 1943 for her maiden combat patrol in the North Atlantic.

== Design ==
German Type VIIC submarines were preceded by the shorter Type VIIB submarines. U-964 had a displacement of 769 tonnes (757 long tons) when at the surface and 871 tonnes (857 long tons) while submerged. She had a total length of 67.10 m (220 ft 2 in), a pressure hull length of 50.50 m (165 ft 8 in), a beam of 6.20 m (20 ft 4 in), a height of 9.60 m (31 ft 6 in), and a draught of 4.74 m (15 ft 7 in). The submarine was powered by two Germaniawerft F46 four-stroke, six-cylinder supercharged diesel engines producing a total of 2,800 to 3,200 metric horsepower (2,060 to 2,350 kW; 2,760 to 3,160 shp) for use while surfaced, two Brown, Boveri & Cie GG UB 720/8 double-acting electric motors producing a total of 750 metric horsepower (550 kW; 740 shp) for use while submerged. She had two shafts and two 1.23 m (4 ft) propellers. The boat was capable of operating at depths of up to 230 metres (750 ft).

The submarine had a maximum surface speed of 17.7 knots (32.8 km/h; 20.4 mph) and a maximum submerged speed of 7.6 knots (14.1 km/h; 8.7 mph). When submerged, the boat could operate for 80 nautical miles (150 km; 92 mi) at 4 knots (7.4 km/h; 4.6 mph); when surfaced, she could travel 8,500 nautical miles (15,700 km; 9,800 mi) at 10 knots (19 km/h; 12 mph). U-964 was fitted with five 53.3 cm (21 in) torpedo tubes (four fitted at the bow and one at the stern), fourteen torpedoes, one 8.8 cm (3.46 in) SK C/35 naval gun, 220 rounds, and one twin 2 cm (0.79 in) C/30 anti-aircraft gun. The boat had a complement of between forty-four and sixty.

== Service history ==
=== War patrol ===
Following her departure from Norway, she passed into the Atlantic and headed southwards towards the Western Approaches. After eleven days sailing, she was still well within range of Allied aircraft when she received a radio message to link with U-470 and U-844 and attack an important convoy several hundred miles to the south. Realising that the only feasible method of reaching the area on time was to travel on the surface, the three boats proceeded south in full daylight on 16 October 1943.

=== Fate ===
Luck ran out fast as a patrolling aircraft spotted the boats and called in Consolidated Liberator aircraft from several different squadrons. A fierce battle followed, in which two Royal Air Force Liberators were shot down before all three boats were sunk. U-964 was seriously damaged by bombs from aircraft of 86 Squadron (particularly from the plane of Flying Officer George Gamble), and began to sink, her crew scrambling over the side into the sea as she settled. Of the approximately 35 men who escaped the submarine, only five survived to be collected by U-231 several days later. Only three of these men subsequently recovered from their ordeal.

== Bibliography ==
- Busch, Rainer; Röll, Hans-Joachim (1999). German U-boat commanders of World War II : a biographical dictionary. Translated by Brooks, Geoffrey. London, Annapolis, Md: Greenhill Books, Naval Institute Press. ISBN 1-55750-186-6.
- Busch, Rainer; Röll, Hans-Joachim (1999). Der U-Boot-Krieg, 1939-1945: Deutsche U-Boot-Verluste von September 1939 bis Mai 1945 [German U-boat losses from September 1939 to May 1945] (in German). Vol. IV. Hamburg, Berlin, Bonn: Mittler. ISBN 3-8132-0514-2.
- Gröner, Erich; Jung, Dieter; Maass, Martin (1991). U-boats and Mine Warfare Vessels. German Warships 1815–1945. Vol. 2. Translated by Thomas, Keith; Magowan, Rachel. London: Conway Maritime Press. ISBN 0-85177-593-4.
- Sharpe, Peter (1998). U-Boat Fact File. Great Britain: Midland Publishing. ISBN 1-85780-072-9.
