= Convoys ONS 20/ON 206 =

Convoys during naval battles of the Second World War

- Part of World War II
Date	15–18 October 1943
Location	North Atlantic
Result	Allied victory

Belligerents
Germany	United Kingdom; Canada

Commanders and leaders
Admiral Karl Dönitz	ONS 20 : Comm: Escort :Cdr HR Paramor ON 206 : Comm : Escort :Cdr RA Currie

Strength
Schlieffen: 14 U-boats	ONS 20: 52 ships 6 escorts ON 206 : 62 ships 5 escorts Support group B7 : 7 warships

Casualties and losses
6 U-boats destroyed	1 ship sunk

ONS 20 and ON 206 were North Atlantic convoys of the ONS/ON series which ran during the battle of the Atlantic in World War II. They were the subject of a major U-boat attack in October 1943, the third battle in the Kriegsmarine's autumn offensive.

== Background ==
Despite the losses suffered by Rossbach and poor results achieved during its attack on SC 143, and still believing their new weapons and tactics gave them an advantage, BdU (Befehlshaber der Unterseeboote Commander of the Submarines) re-organized the boats then in the North Atlantic into patrol line Schlieffen with the intention of intercepting the expected west-bound convoys. These were ONS 20 and ON 206.

== Ships involved ==
ONS 20 departed Liverpool on 9 October 1943. Composed of 52 ships it was bound for Halifax, and was escorted by B-4 escort group, which comprised 6 destroyer escorts led by HMS Bentinck (Cdr HR Paramor as Senior Officer Escort).

ON 206 departed Liverpool on 11 October 1943; Composed of 62 ships, mainly in ballast, it was bound for New York and was escorted by B-6 escort group, comprising 2 destroyers, Fame (Cdr RA Currie SOE) and Vanquisher, the frigate Deveron, and 3 corvettes.

Also in the vicinity was Escort group B-7, in the role of a support group; it comprised 2 destroyers, Duncan (Cdr P Gretton) and Vidette, and 4 corvettes.

Group Schlieffen comprised a number of U-boats from group Rossbach, re-inforced by newcomers from bases in France and Germany. It had already come under attack whilst re-fueling by aircraft from USS Card; one boat was damaged and forced to retire, and 2 boats (U-402 and U-603 ) had been sunk. Another 2 boats had collided, and one of these was also forced to return to base for repair. At the time of the attack on convoys Schlieffen consisted of 14 boats, with a mix of experience and type.

When Allied intelligence learned of the position of Schlieffen, Western Approaches Command decided to seek battle, increasing the defence by joining the two convoys and their escorts, and sending B-7 as reinforcement.

== Action ==
On 15 October 1943 the convoys were sighted by U-844, and group Schlieffen was direct to converge on the position. By evening a number of boats were in position and commenced the attack, which became one of the most calamitous of the entire campaign for the U-boat Arm (U-Bootwaffe, UBW). During the night of 15/16 October the U-boats attacked but were repulsed; U-844 was damaged by Duncan and Vanquisher and driven off. Later on 16 October U-844 was attacked and sunk by two Liberators from 86 Squadron and 59 Squadron (Royal Air Force); one Liberator was shot down and the crew was rescued by the corvette Pink. U-964 was sunk by a Liberator of 86 Squadron; her survivors were later picked up by U-231. Early that day U-470 was damaged by a Sunderland of 422 Squadron (Royal Canadian Air Force); the Sunderland was also damaged, ditching later near the ships of ONS 20 and its crew was rescued by HMS Drury. Later, U-470 was attacked again by two Liberators from RAF 120 Squadron and another from 59 Squadron and sunk; two of her crew were picked up by Duncan. The only success for the Schlieffen boats that day was when U-426 sank the freighter Essex Lance, which was straggling from ONS 20.

During the night of 16/17 October the attack was renewed but repulsed with no success; U-540 was attacked and damaged by a Liberator of 59 Squadron; later that day she was attacked again and sunk by two Liberators from 59 and 120 squadrons. Also on 17 October U-841 was sunk by Byard of B-4 Group. During the night of 17/18 October the shadower U-631 was sunk by HMS Sunflower of B-7 Group. The convoys made a drastic alteration in course, to shake off any shadowers; this was successful in that BdU received conflicting reports from U-91 and U-413, leading to Schlieffen being sent in the wrong direction. Schlieffen was unable to re-gain contact and in view of the losses sustained BdU ordered the group to retire. On 20 October, with no further attack developing, B-7 Group detached from the convoys to join ON 207, which was following; ONS 20 was handed over to its Western Local Escort Group on 22 October and arrived at Halifax without further loss on 26 October 1943. ON 206 met its Local Escort Group on 24 October and arrived at New York on 27 October 1943.

== Conclusion ==
BdU regarded this operation as a setback but remained confident that their new weapons and tactics would achieve success. The loss of six U-boats for the sinking of one ship was a big defeat for the UbW and is seen as a victory for the Allies.

== Tables ==
Allied ships sunk

Date	Name	Nationality	Casualties	Tonnage	Sunk by...
16 October 1943	Essex Lance	British	none	6625 GRT	U-426

Axis submarines destroyed

Date	Number	Type	Location	Casualties	Sunk by...
16 Oct 1943	U-470	VIIC	Atlantic SW of Iceland; 58°20′N 29°20′W	46	Air attack by Sund "S" 422 Sqn RCAF, Lib "E" 120 Sqn; Lib "Z" 120 Sqn; Lib "C" 59 Sqn
16 Oct	U-964	VIIC	Atlantic; 58°34′N 05°46′W	47	Air attack by Lib "Y" 86 Sqn
16 Oct	U-844	IXC	Atlantic SW of Iceland; 58°30′N 27°16′W	53	Air attack by Lib "L" 86 Sqn; Lib "S" 59 Sqn ( attacked 15/16 by Duncan, Vanquisher)
17 Oct	U-540	IXC/40	North Atlantic E of Cape Farewell; 58°38′N 31°56′W	55	Air attack by Lib "D" 58 Sqn; Lib "H" 120 Sqn (attacked 16 Oct by Lib "S" 59 Sqn)
17 Oct	U-631	VIIC	North Atlantic SE of Cape Farewell; 58°13′N 32°29′W	53	d/c by HMS Sunflower
17 Oct	U-841	IXC/40	North Atlantic E of Cape Farewell; 59°57′N 31°06′W	26	d/c by HMS Byard (prior attack by aircraft)

== See also ==
- List of shipwrecks in October 1943
