= No. 59 Squadron RAF =

Defunct flying squadron of the Royal Air Force

- Active: 1 August 1916 – 4 August 1919; 28 June 1937 – 15 June 1946; 1 Dec 1947 – 31 October 1950; 1 Sept 1956 – 4 January 1961
- Country: United Kingdom
- Branch: Royal Air Force
- Mottos: Latin: Ab uno disce omnes ("From one teach all")

Insignia
- Badge: A broken wheel.
- Squadron codes: PJ Sep 1938 – Sep 1939; TR Sep 1939 – Oct 1942; 1 Aug 1943 – Jul 1944; WE Jul 1944 – Oct 1945; BY Oct 1945 – Jun 1946, Dec 1947 – Oct 1950

No. 59 Squadron was a squadron of the Royal Air Force, based in Norfolk, England.

== History ==
No.59 Squadron was formed at Narborough Airfield in Norfolk on 1 August 1916 as a squadron of the Royal Flying Corps. On 13 February 1917, the squadron crossed the English Channel, deploying to Saint-Omer in northern France to operate in the army co-operation role, equipped with Royal Aircraft Factory R.E.8s. On 1 April 1918 all RFC squadrons were absorbed into the newly formed Royal Air Force (RAF)

=== Second World War ===
At the beginning of the Second World War, No. 59 Squadron was operating the Bristol Blenheim (1937–1940). In April-May 1940, the squadron operated from bases in France as part of the Advanced Air Striking Force (AASF), in support of the BEF. It then returned to England and Bomber Command, taking part in a major raid on Bremen.

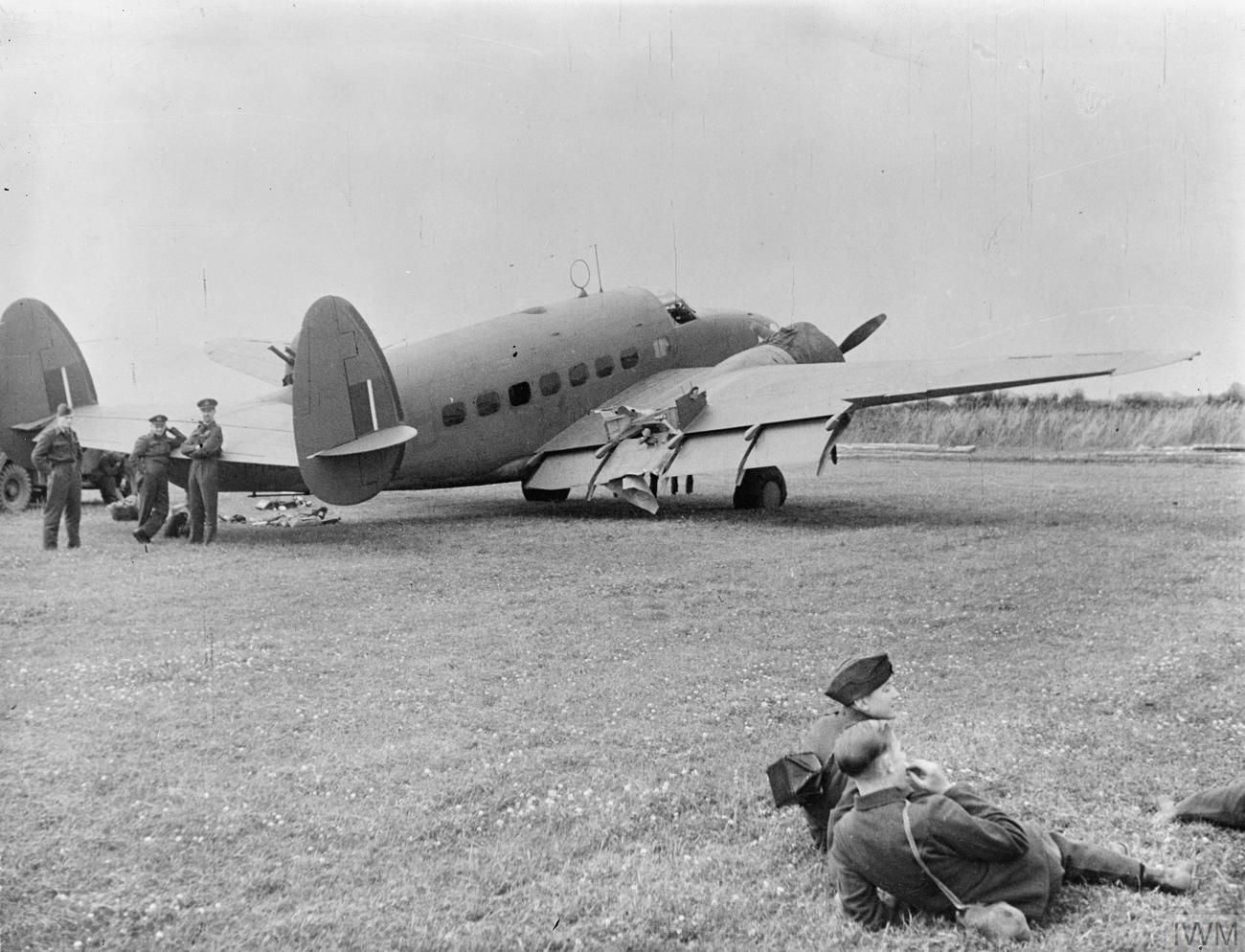
A Lockheed Hudson of No. 59 Squadron after its wing was struck by AA fire during an anti-shipping patrol over the North Sea, mid-1942.

Re-equipped with the Lockheed Hudson, the squadron served in the maritime patrol role with Coastal Command, from late 1940. In December 1941, six Hudsons and their crews from 59 Sqn were detached to support the ill-fated campaign in Malaya and Singapore. At Palembang, Sumatra, these crews and aircraft were permanently integrated into No. 8 Squadron, Royal Australian Air Force (a Hudson unit that had been depleted in action against Japanese forces).

The squadron was restored to full strength in the UK, and came to include many aircrew from other Commonwealth air forces.

In late 1942, 59 Sqn was re-equipped with the Consolidated Liberator and continued in the maritime patrol role until the war's end.

=== Cold War ===
Following the Second World War, 59 Sqn was attached to Transport Command, flying troops to India from September 1945 until 15 June 1946, when the squadron was disbanded.

On 1 December 1947 whilst at RAF Waterbeach, half the crews of No. 51 Squadron were redesignated No. 59 Squadron, a long range transport unit, flying Avro Yorks. A detached flight would later take part in the Berlin Airlift (1948–49). The squadron disbanded again on 31 October 1950.

It was reformed at RAF Gutersloh, Germany in August 1956, when No. 102 Squadron was redesignated, flying English Electric Canberra B.2 and B(I).8 bombers. No 59 Squadron was last disbanded in 1961, when it was redesignated to No.3 Squadron.
