= October 1943 =

Month of 1943

<<	October 1943					>>
Su	Mo	Tu	We	Th	Fr	Sa
					1	2
3	4	5	6	7	8	9
10	11	12	13	14	15	16
17	18	19	20	21	22	23
24	25	26	27	28	29	30
31

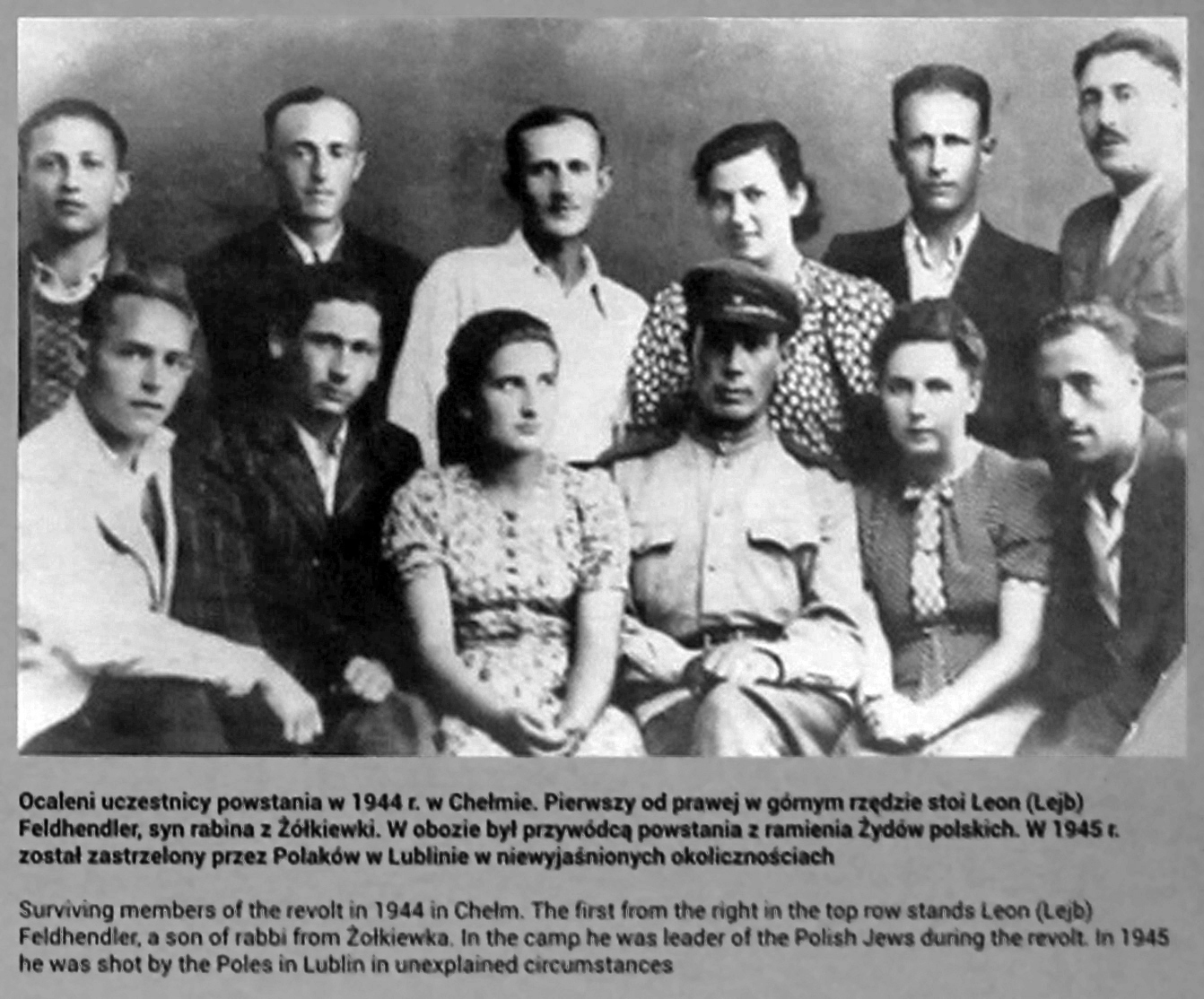
October 14, 1943: Death camp inmate Leon Feldhendler leads uprising and mass escape from Sobibor

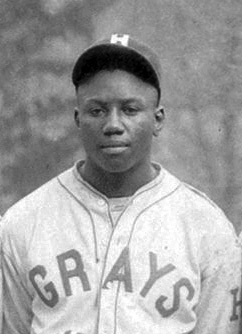
October 5, 1943: Josh Gibson and Homestead Grays win Negro World Series

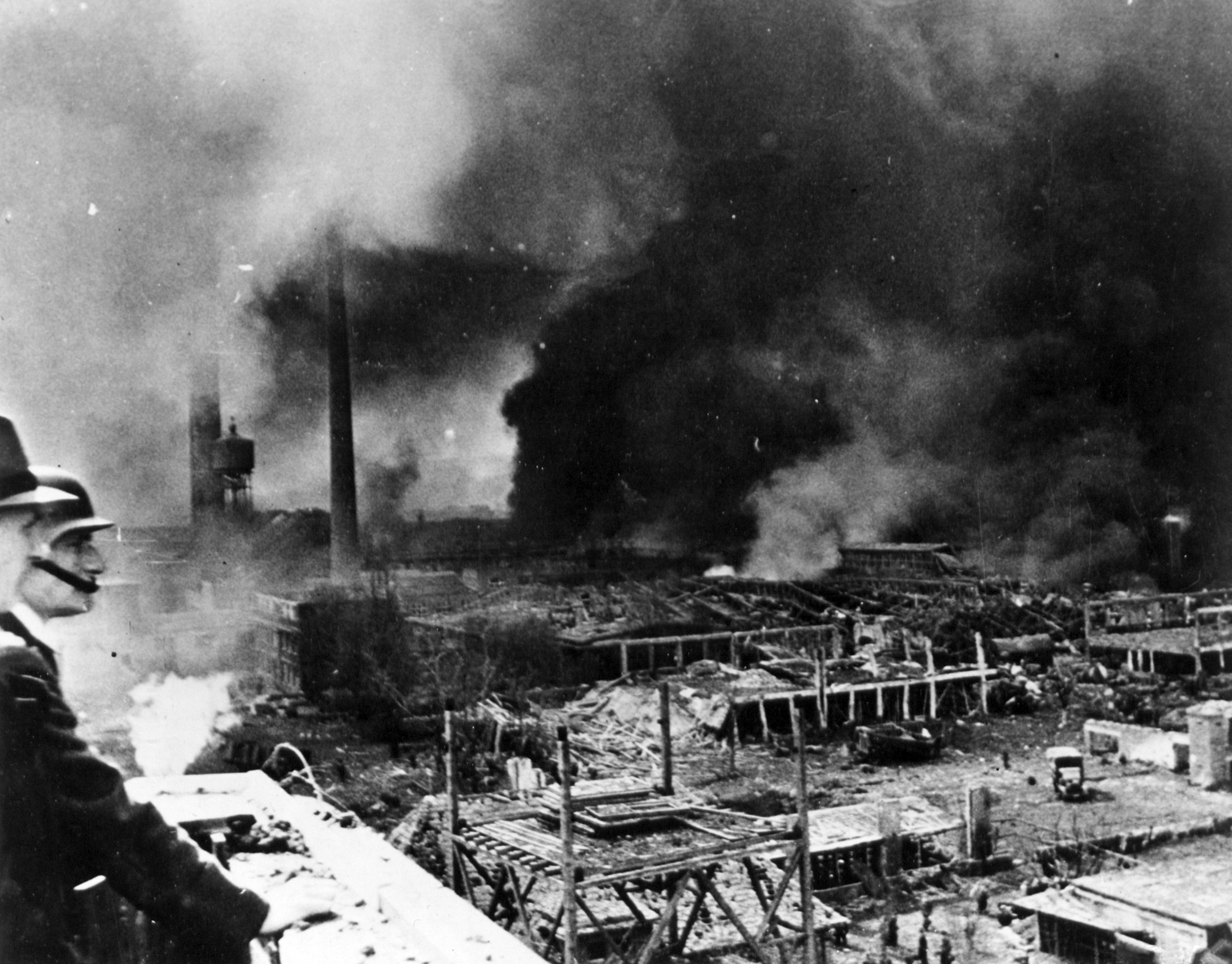
October 22, 1943: Bombing of Kassel kills 10,000

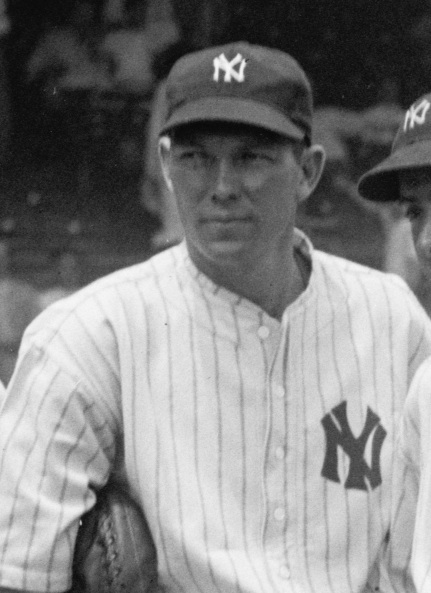
October 11, 1943: Bill Dickey and New York Yankees win MLB World Series

The following events occurred in October 1943:

== October 1, 1943 (Friday) ==
- The U.S. Fifth Army captured Naples. Before retreating, the German Army laid waste to the city, damaging or destroying the cultural landmarks, including the University of Naples and the Teatro di San Carlo. More than 200,000 books, many of them priceless, were soaked in gasoline and burned.
- W. Averell Harriman, a wealthy American capitalist, was named as the new U.S. Ambassador to the Soviet Union.
- The musical film Sweet Rosie O'Grady, starring Betty Grable, was released.
- Born:
  - Jean-Jacques Annaud, French film director known for Quest for Fire and The Bear; in Juvisy-sur-Orge
  - Jerry Martini, saxophonist for Sly and the Family Stone; in Denver
  - Muneji Munemura, Japanese Greco-Roman wrestler, gold medal winner at the 1968 Olympics; in Niigata
  - Jakob Finci, Jewish leader in Bosnia and Herzegovina and diplomat; on Rab, Croatian SR, Yugoslavia
  - José Santacruz Londoño, Colombian drug lord, in Cali (killed 1996)
  - Ann Wolpert, American digital librarian (d. 2013)
  - Willie L. Williams, Los Angeles Police Department chief, 1992-1997; in Philadelphia (d. 2016)
  - Patrick D'Rozario, Roman Catholic Archbishop of Dhaka and highest Catholic church official in Bangladesh; in Padrishibpur, Barisal, British India.
- Died: Don Scott, 25, American college football All-American who passed up a professional football career to volunteer for the U.S. Army Air Forces during World War II, was killed along with his crew mates when his B-26 bomber crashed.

== October 2, 1943 (Saturday) ==
- A decree by the government of Japan eliminated the student exemption from induction into the Empire's armed forces.
- The Tudor Vladimirescu Division was created by the Soviet Union, from Romanian prisoners of war who were given the choice of "volunteering" to fight against Nazi Germany, or to remain incarcerated.
- The government of Sweden issued a proclamation welcoming all refugees from Denmark to the kingdom, which had remained neutral during the war.
- In Nazi-occupied Poland, Governor Hans Frank issued a decree implementing the creation of Standgerichte, a special court operated by members of the Gestapo, with authority to carry out its sentences immediately. Hundreds of citizens in Kraków, who had been jailed and were awaiting trial, were indicted, tried and executed in the first sessions of the Standgericht.
- The Second Battle of Smolensk ended in Soviet victory.
- Born:
  - Franklin Rosemont, American surrealist artist; in Chicago (d. 2009)
  - William Margold, American pornographic film actor and director; in Washington, D.C. (d. 2017)
  - Mary Sue Coleman, American university administrator who served as president of the University of Iowa and the University of Michigan
- Died:
  - Ambrose Tomlinson, 78, white American Pentecostal minister who founded the Church of God of Prophecy
  - R. Nathaniel Dett, 60, black Canadian musical composer
  - Carlos Blanco Galindo, 61, President of Bolivia 1930 to 1931
  - I. B. Perrine, 82, Idaho businessman and farmer credited as the founder of Twin Falls, Idaho.

== October 3, 1943 (Sunday) ==
- An experimental television program, The Bureau of Missing Persons, premiered on the DuMont Television Network. A forerunner of the 1990 premiere of America's Most Wanted, the show, hosted by NYPD Captain John J. Cronin, showed photographs of missing persons and invited the few television set owners, in New York City, to call the local police for any clues in identification.
- After General Henri Giraud stepped aside as a co-director, General Charles de Gaulle became the sole leader of France's Committee for National Liberation, which would form the basis of the nation's post-war government.
- SS General Dr. Werner Best declared Denmark to be judenfrei, although most of the nation's Jews had learned of the impending mass arrests and were in hiding, awaiting the chance to flee to Sweden.
- The United States agreed to loan Saudi Arabia two million dollars' worth of silver in order for the Saudis to create a stable currency.
- British Commandos began Operation Devon, an amphibious landing at the town of Termoli on the Adriatic coast of Italy.
- The Battle of Kos began for the island of Kos in the Aegean Sea.
- Nazi Wehrmacht forces committed the Lyngiades massacre in northwest Greece as an arbitrary reprisal against Greek partisan guerrillas.
- The American destroyer USS Henley was torpedoed and sunk at Finschhaven, New Guinea by the Japanese submarine Ro-108.
- The British destroyer Usurper was sunk in the Gulf of Genoa by the German anti-submarine vessel UJ 2208.
- Born:
  - Aaron Latham, American journalist and screenwriter, in Spur, Texas (d. 2022)
  - Yohji Yamamoto, Japanese fashion designer in Europe and Asia; in Tokyo

== October 4, 1943 (Monday) ==
Himmler

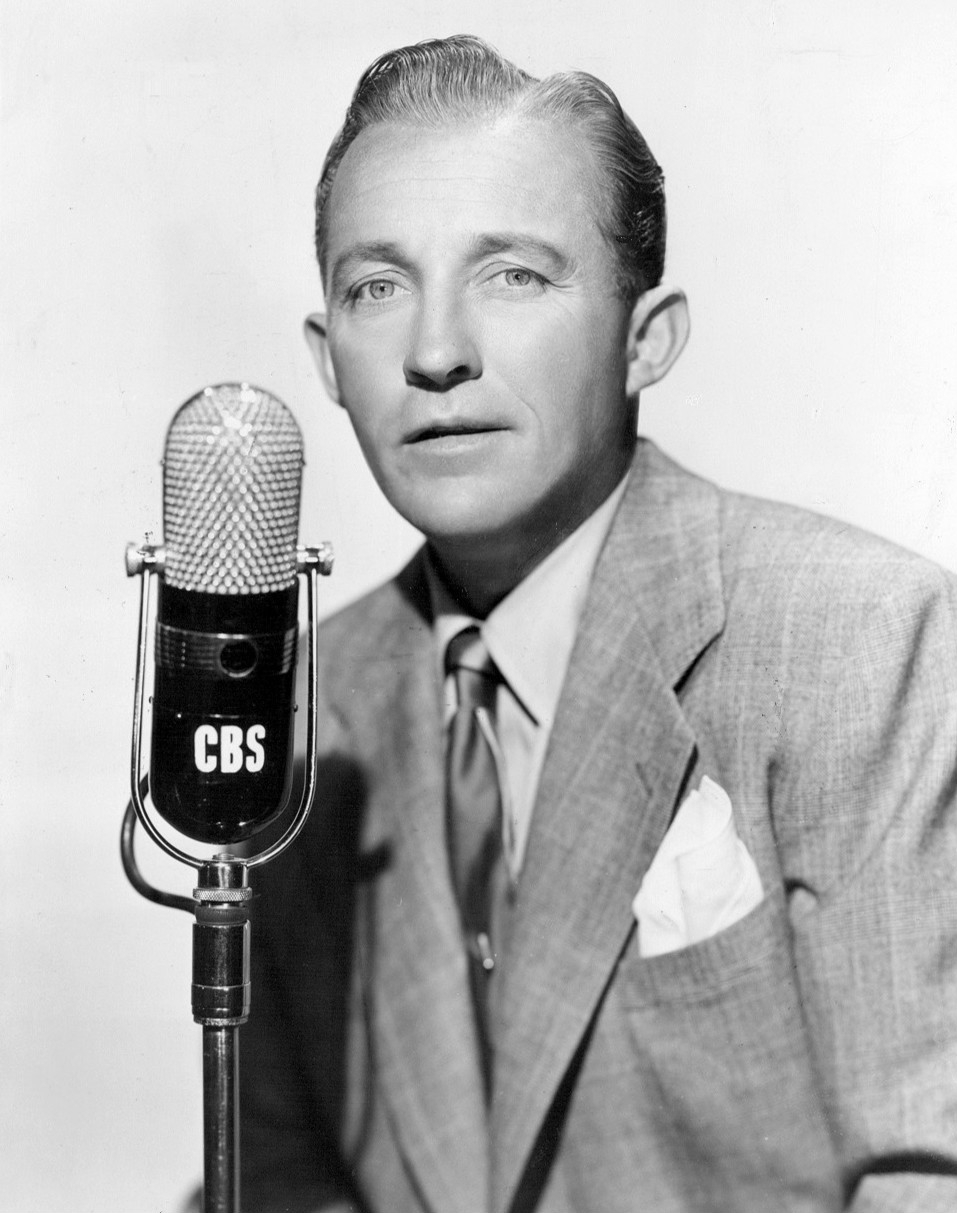
Crosby

- Heinrich Himmler delivered the first of the two Posen speeches to assembled SS officers and German administrators in the German city of Posen (now Poznań in Poland). "What happens to the Russians, what happens to the Czechs, is a matter of utter indifference to me," he said. "Such good blood of our own kind as there may be among the nations we shall acquire for ourselves, if necessary by taking away the children and bringing them up among us. Whether the other races live in comfort or perish of hunger interests me only in so far as we need them as slaves for our culture." He added, "We shall never be rough or heartless where it is not necessary; that is clear. We Germans, who are the only people in the world who have a decent attitude to animals, will also adopt a decent attitude to these human animals...I shall speak to you here with all frankness of a very serious subject. We shall now discuss it absolutely openly among ourselves, nevertheless we shall never speak of it in public. I mean the evacuation of the Jews, the extermination of the Jewish race...."
- In an attack by 406 bombers of the Royal Air Force on the city center of Frankfurt, a children's hospital on Gagernstrasse suffered a direct hit on its air-raid shelter. There were 529 civilian deaths, including 90 children, 14 nurses and a doctor.
- The Battle of Kos ended when the German Army conquered the Greek island of Kos, took the 4,423 Italian and British troops there prisoner, then carried out Adolf Hitler's order to execute any Italian officers who had switched allegiance from the Axis to the Allies. Colonel Felice Leggio and 100 of his fellow officers were shot in groups of ten, then buried.
- The island of Corsica, seized by Italy and Germany from France in the 1940 conquest, was liberated by the Allies after a battle of 25 days.
- The Battle of Dumpu ended in Allied victory.
- The Battle of Drashovica ended in victory for the Albanian resistance fighters.
- American carrier-based aircraft carried out Operation Leader, an attack on German shipping along the coast of Norway.
- The German submarines U-279, U-389, U-422 and U-460 were all depth charged and sunk in the Atlantic Ocean by Allied aircraft.
- Bing Crosby first recorded his second-most famous Christmas song, "I'll Be Home for Christmas", parenthetically titled "(if only in my dreams)".
- Born:
  - John Bindon, English gangster and actor, in Fulham (d. 1993)
  - H. Rap Brown (Jamil Abdullah Al-Amin), African-American radical, founder of the Student Nonviolent Coordinating Committee and convicted murderer, as Hubert Gerold Brown, in Baton Rouge, Louisiana (d. 2025)

== October 5, 1943 (Tuesday) ==
- American bombers were able to attack Wake Island, under control of the Japanese, for the first time since an abortive attempt in 1942.
- The Japanese ocean liner Hondon Maru was supposedly sunk by a torpedo, while traveling from Japan to Korea, killing 544 of the 616 people on board, according to a news broadcast made two days later on Tokyo radio. American reports noted that "The vessel is not listed in Lloyd's Register" and questioned its veracity.
- Theodore Morde of Reader's Digest met with Franz von Papen, the German ambassador to Turkey, in what would be described later as "a crazy attempt at personal diplomacy". At the request of OSS chief William J. Donovan, without the knowledge of President Roosevelt, Morde attempted to persuade Papen to lead a coup to overthrow Adolf Hitler, with Papen to be the new leader of Germany. Papen declined the offer.
- In the 1943 Negro World Series, the Homestead Grays of Pittsburgh, champions of the Negro National League, defeated the Birmingham Black Barons of the Negro American League, 8-4, to win the Series in seven games. The contest, played in Montgomery, Alabama, was actually Game 8, but Game 3 had ended with the score tied in extra innings. Josh Gibson, Buck Leonard and Vic Harris led the Grays in hitting.
- German submarine U-336 was sunk in the Denmark Strait by a Lockheed Hudson of No. 269 Squadron RAF.
- A Serbian and former Yugoslav news agency, Tanjug was founded in Belgrade.
- Born: Steve Miller, American rock guitarist who founded the Steve Miller Band; in Milwaukee
- Died: Leon Roppolo, 41, American jazz clarinetist

== October 6, 1943 (Wednesday) ==
- American and Japanese ships fought the naval Battle of Vella Lavella, after nine Japanese destroyers arrived to evacuate troops from New Georgia island. Six U.S. Navy destroyers intercepted the Japanese, and the battle lasted two days, with the loss of one ship on each side. The evacuation of the Japanese was completed by October 8, and the recapture of the island ended the second phase of Operation Cartwheel.
- Heinrich Himmler gave the second of his two Posen Speeches, outlining the carrying out of the Holocaust to the assembled SS officers. The text of the speech would not be published until 1974. In his address, Himmler said, "The question will be asked: 'What about women and children?' I did not consider myself entitled to exterminate the men, to kill them or have them killed, and then allow their children to grow up to revenge themselves on our own sons and grandsons. The painful decision had to be taken, to remove this people from the face of the earth..."
- British Commandos completed Operation Devon successfully.
- In an effort to intercede against the genocide of Jews in much of Europe, 400 rabbis marched in Washington, D.C. demanding action from President Franklin D. Roosevelt.

== October 7, 1943 (Thursday) ==
- In the aftermath of the Białystok Ghetto Uprising, 1,313 Jews arrested at Białystok, nearly all of them children, were murdered shortly after arriving at the Auschwitz concentration camp. The Auschwitz camp log for that day states that "1,260 Jewish children and 53 Czech chaperones arrived from Theresienstadt in a transport arranged by the Reich Main Security Office. They were killed in gas chambers on the day of their arrival..."
- More than 100 people, most of them Italian civilians, were killed in the explosion of a time bomb at the main post office in Naples. The explosive had been planted more than a week earlier by agents of the German occupation forces as they retreated from the Allied advance.
- Two days after the American bombardment of Wake Island, the remaining 97 American civilians there were executed on orders of Japan's Admiral Shigematsu Sakaibara. Under the direction of Lieutenant Torashi Ito, Japanese soldiers marched the blindfolded prisoners to a beach on the northeast side of the island, shot them with machine guns, then buried their bodies in a mass grave.
- The American submarine USS S-44 was shelled and sunk off Uomi Saki, Kuril Islands by the Japanese escort ship Ishigaki.
- The New Georgia Campaign ended in Allied victory.
- The children's film Lassie Come Home, the first in a series of seven MGM movies starring the fictional Rough Collie dog Lassie, was released. A young Roddy McDowall played Lassie's companion.
- Born: Oliver North, U.S. Marine lieutenant colonel, National Security Council staffer during Iran-Contra affair, and military historian; in San Antonio, Texas

== October 8, 1943 (Friday) ==
- The last Jewish residents of the Liepaja Ghetto, in German-occupied Latvia, were deported and sent to the Kaiserwald concentration camp. Before the 1941 invasion, there had been more than 7,000 Jewish residents of Liepaja. Only 832 remained by mid-1942, when the order went out to confine them to a small area of the city.
- The German submarines U-419, U-610 and U-643 were all depth charged and sunk in the Atlantic Ocean by Allied aircraft.
- Polish destroyer Orkan was sunk in the North Atlantic by German submarine U-378.
- Born:
  - Chevy Chase, American TV comedian and film actor, as Cornelius Crane Chase in New York City
  - R. L. Stine, American author of children's books, best known for the Goosebumps series of horror stories; in Columbus, Ohio

== October 9, 1943 (Saturday) ==
- Three days after sending a request to German Foreign Minister Joachim von Ribbentrop to allow the 8,000 Jews of occupied Rome to be used in construction projects rather than being deported to Germany, SS representative Herbert Kappler was told that their removal was being ordered directly on instructions from Adolf Hitler. The arrests would be made one week later, although all but 1,259 of the 8,000 would actually be caught in that night's roundup.
- The Land Battle of Vella Lavella ended in Allied victory.
- The Jesselton Revolt began in British Borneo by guerrilla forces against Japanese occupying troops.
- The American destroyer USS Buck was torpedoed and sunk in the Tyrrhenian Sea off Salerno by German submarine U-616.
- British destroyer HMS Panther was bombed and sunk in the Scarpento Channel by German Junkers Ju 87 aircraft.
- Died: Pieter Zeeman, 78, Dutch physicist and Nobel Prize laureate

== October 10, 1943 (Sunday) ==
- The German city of Münster was heavily bombed in the first daytime raid by the United States Eighth Air Force, with the entire force of 236 B-17 Flying Fortress bombers attacking the historic city. With 216 P-47 Thunderbolt fighters flying cover, the formation flew in a line 15 miles long. Germany's Luftwaffe sent up 350 fighters — roughly the equivalent of three full Geschwader — to engage the American force, while antiaircraft guns fired at the armada. Nearly 700 civilians were killed in Munster, while thirty American bombers were shot down, and 105 badly damaged, with a loss of 308 American airmen and officers missing. Of the thirteen B-17s sent out on the raid by the 100th Bomb Group, only one, piloted by Robert Rosenthal, made it back to the unit's base at Thorpe Abbots.
- Chiang Kai-shek formally took the oath of office as Chairman of the National Government in China, a position equivalent to President. He would hold it until 1949 in mainland China, and, after fleeing to Taiwan, until his death on April 5, 1975.

== October 11, 1943 (Monday) ==
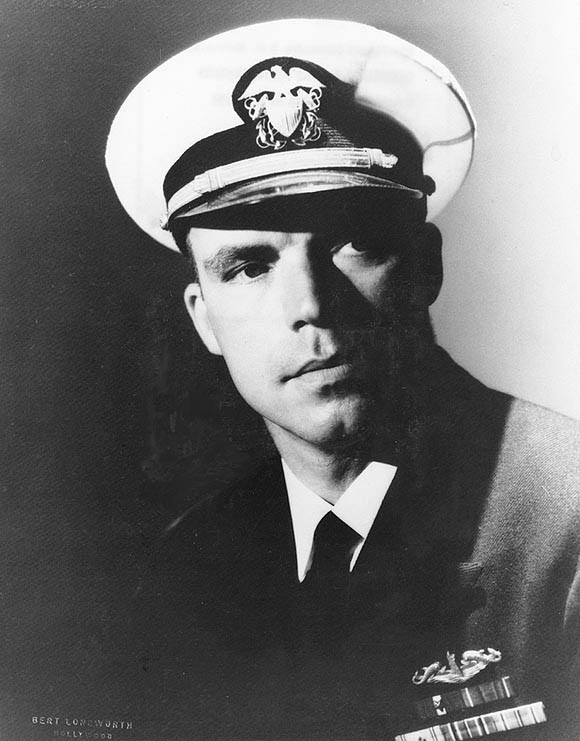
Morton

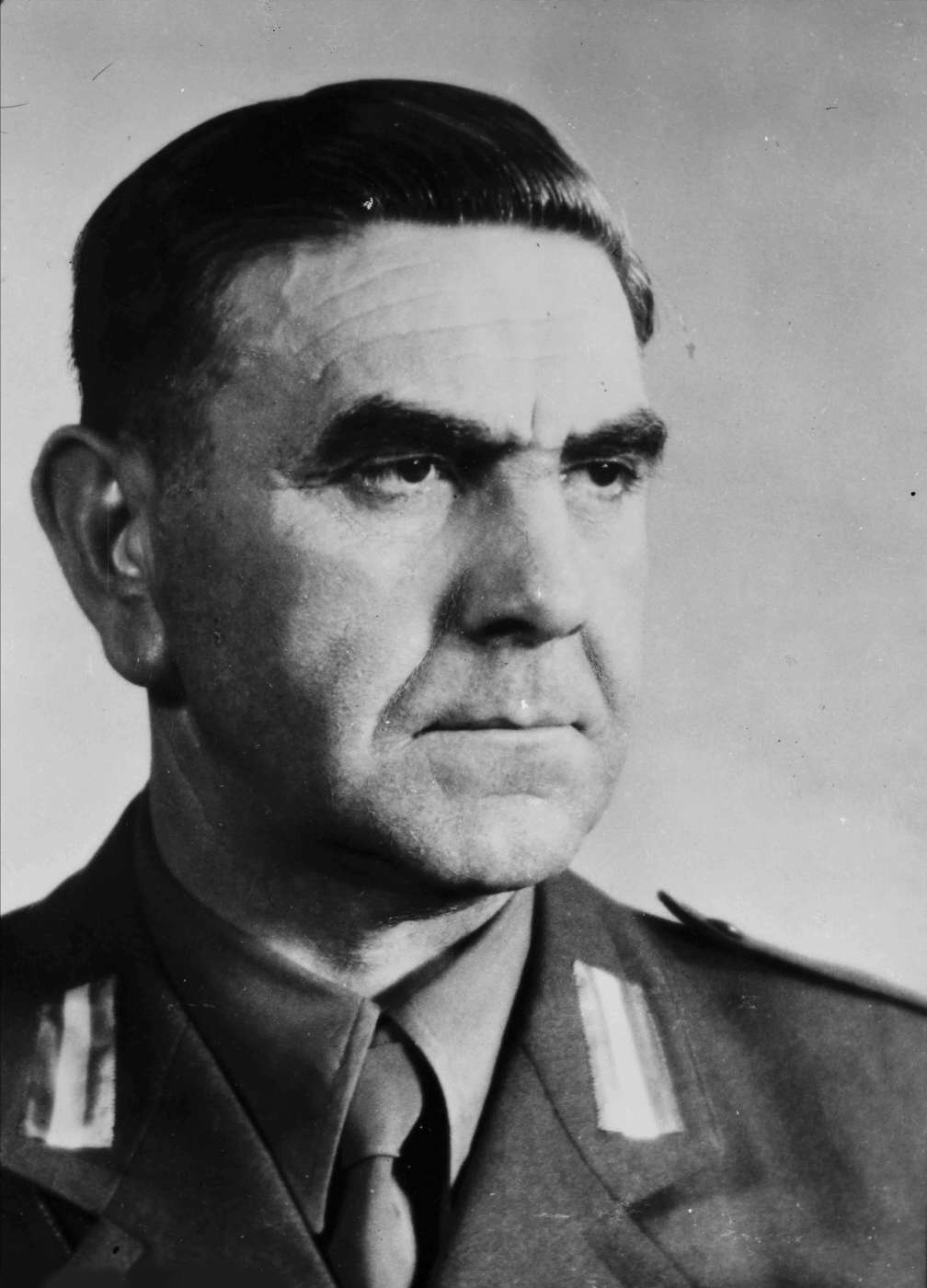
Pavelić

- The submarine USS Wahoo was sunk by Imperial Japanese armed forces in the Soya (La Perouse) Strait with the loss of its crew of 80, including its aggressive and highly successful skipper Dudley Walker "Mush" Morton.
- Ante Pavelić, leader of the Nazi controlled Independent State of Croatia, fled the puppet state's capital in Zagreb, as the partisan troops led by Josip Broz Tito closed in on the city.
- The New York Yankees won the World Series in five games, defeating the St. Louis Cardinals, 2-0. Yankees' catcher Bill Dickey hit the home that scored both runs in the sixth inning.

== October 12, 1943 (Tuesday) ==
- Sale of NBC's Blue Network of radio stations was approved by the Federal Communications Commission, effectively settling the FCC's antitrust lawsuit against NBC, which operated the Red Network and Blue Network with separate programming. The purchaser was the new American Broadcasting Company (ABC) organized by Edward J. Noble, and $8,000,000 was paid to NBC. The name "Blue Network" would be retained for two more years, after which it re-branded itself ABC Radio, and would eventually create the ABC Television Network.
- Portugal, still neutral in World War II, granted the United Kingdom use of naval and air bases on the Azores Islands, under an agreement made 570 years before. The use of the bases was justified under a treaty that had been made in 1373 between England and Portugal.
- The United States launched an aerial attack on the Japanese airbase at Rabaul on the southwestern Pacific island of New Britain, part of Papua New Guinea. During the raid, 87 B-24 bombers sank the 6,000-ton Japanese transport Keisho Maru and two small craft. Two destroyers were damaged by near misses and the storage area was set aflame by the bombing. Two Japanese fighters were shot down, nine were destroyed or heavily damaged on the ground and 36 aircraft suffered minor damage. Five American aircraft were shot down.
- The Battle of John's Knoll–Trevor's Ridge began between Australian and Japanese forces in the Territory of New Guinea.
- The Battle of Lenino began on the Eastern Front.
- Died: Max Wertheimer, 63, Bohemian-born psychologist and founder of Gestalt psychology

== October 13, 1943 (Wednesday) ==
- Thirty-five days after it had been fighting as a member of the Axis powers against the Allies, Italy declared war on Germany, with a broadcast by Prime Minister Pietro Badoglio at 3:00 pm local time. Italy had entered the war on June 10, 1940, with a declaration of war against France and the United Kingdom.
- The two-day Battle of John's Knoll–Trevor's Ridge ended in Allied victory.
- The two-day Battle of Lenino ended in Soviet-Polish offensive failure.
- The American destroyer Bristol was torpedoed and sunk in the Mediterranean Sea off Algiers by German submarine U-371.
- The German submarine U-402 was torpedoed and sunk in the Atlantic Ocean by an American Grumman TBF Avenger from the escort carrier USS Card.

== October 14, 1943 (Thursday) ==
- Jewish prisoners at the Sobibor extermination camp in Poland launched an uprising against their German captors. The attack, co-ordinated by Leon Feldhendler and Captain Alexander Pechersky (a Soviet prisoner of war), was partially successful. Eleven German SS men and several Ukrainian guards were killed, and about 300 of the 700 inmates were able to escape. Many of the escapees died when they fled through the minefields that surrounded the death camp, and others were recaptured and killed, but about 50 were able to survive. Those prisoners who had elected not to escape were killed and the camp was closed.
- In the second raid on the German industrial city of Schweinfurt, the U.S. Eighth Air Force sent 291 B-17 bombers to attack Germany's ball bearing factories, which were met by several hundred German fighters. Sixty of the bombers were shot down, and another 133 were heavily damaged, while the Germans lost 35 fighters. It took four months for the Eighth Air Force to return to full capacity.

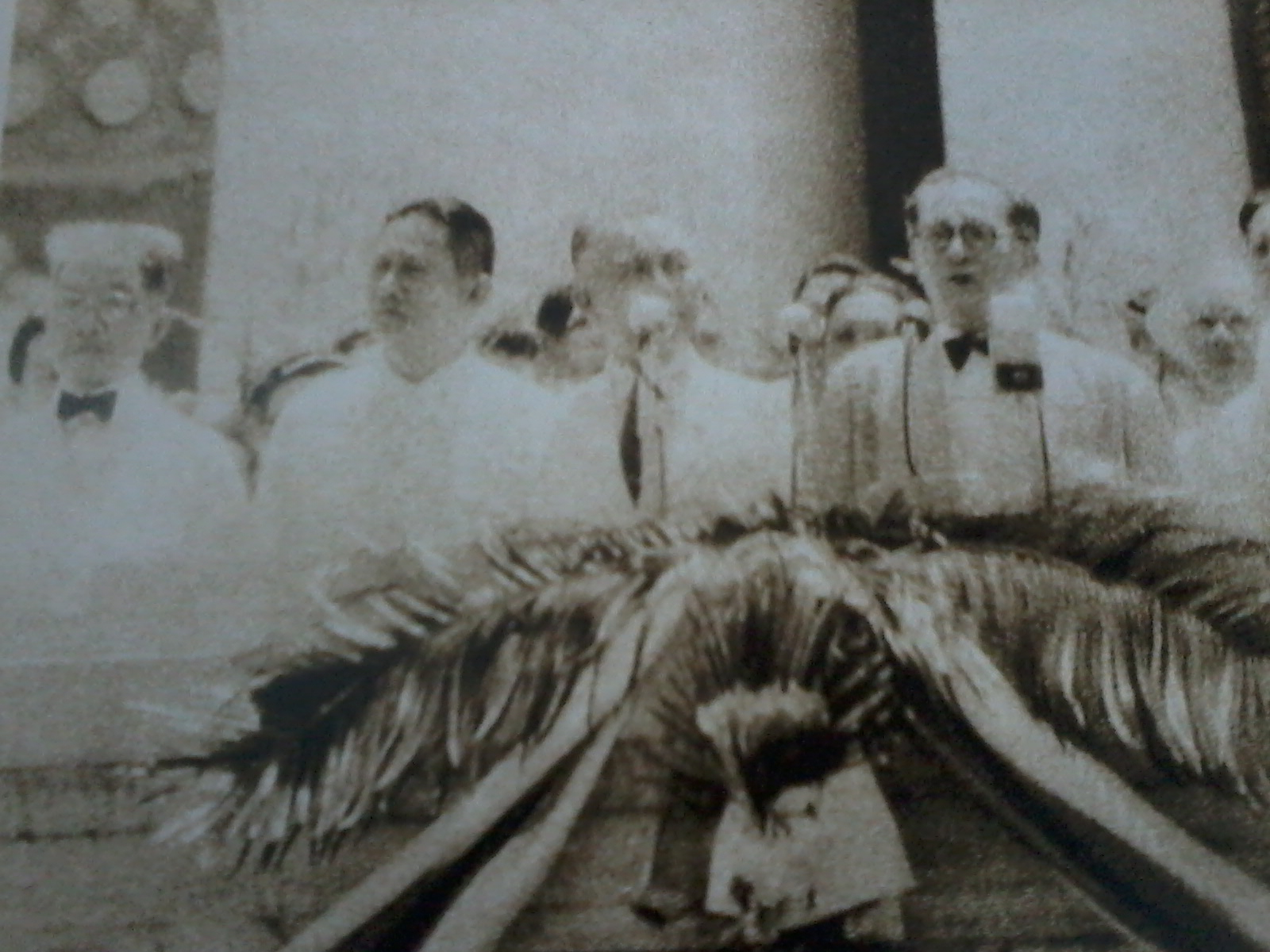
President Laurel

- José P. Laurel, formerly a justice of the Philippines Supreme Court, took the oath of office as President of the nominally-independent Second Philippine Republic, under the sponsorship of Japan. The Republic's first act was to sign an alliance with Japan.
- Born: Mohammad Khatami, Iranian theologian and President of Iran 1997–2005; in Ardakan

== October 15, 1943 (Friday) ==
- American Airlines Flight 63, with ten people aboard, crashed into a deep gulch near Centerville, Tennessee, with no survivors. The DC-3 departed Nashville at 10:48 pm, bound for Memphis, and made its last transmission half an hour later.
- The British Eighth Army captured Vinchiaturo.
- Andrew Cunningham replaced Dudley Pound as First Sea Lord.
- Born: Penny Marshall, American actress and film director, in New York City (d. 2018)

== October 16, 1943 (Saturday) ==
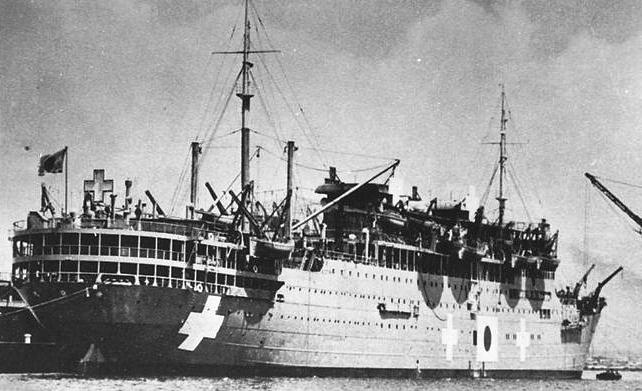
Teia Maru

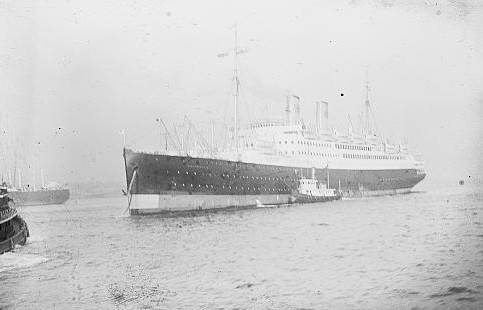
MS Gripsholm

- With 3,000 people being released to their home countries in one of the largest repatriations during the war between the United States and Japan, the Swedish "repatriation liner" MS Gripsholm docked alongside the Japanese liner Teia Maru, at the Portuguese Indian port of Mormugao. The Gripsholm was carrying 1,500 Japanese nationals, while the Teia Maru had 1,503 citizens from the United States, United Kingdom and France.
- German police in occupied Rome arrested 1,259 Jews, though 252 were subsequently released after being deemed to be children of mixed marriages. Many others had gotten word of the order of October 9, and fled from their homes to find sanctuary with Gentile friends or in Roman Catholic churches or institutions.
- The German submarines U-470, U-533, U-844 and U-964 were all lost to enemy action.
- Born: Paul Rose, Canadian Quebec nationalist and assassin, in 1970, of Quebec Labour Minister Pierre Laporte; in Montreal (d. 2013)

== October 17, 1943 (Sunday) ==
- The German cruiser Michel, which was the last "merchant raider" (a ship disguised as an unarmed merchant vessel but equipped with weaponry), was torpedoed and sunk off Japan by the American submarine USS Tarpon. The Michel had sunk 17 Allied merchant ships.
- The Burma Railway was completed between Bangkok, Thailand and Rangoon, Burma (modern-day Myanmar) (415 km (258 mi)) by the Empire of Japan to support its forces in the Burma campaign using the forced labour of Asian civilians and Allied prisoners of war.
- The German submarines U-540, U-631 and U-841 were all lost in the Atlantic Ocean to enemy action.
- After five years of construction, the city of Chicago began regular service on its first subway, a 4.9-mile (7.9 km) stretch of underground track that ran from State Street and Clybourn Avenue. At the dedication the day before, Mayor Edward J. Kelly declared that the subway was "all the more a remarkable accomplishment since many famous engineers had declared it was impossible."
- Died: Paul Vignon, 78, French scholar who spent 43 years studying the Shroud of Turin

== October 18, 1943 (Monday) ==
- Two days after the roundup of Jews in Rome, 1,007 were sent directly to the Auschwitz concentration camp, where they would arrive on October 23 for extermination.
- Count Carlo Sforza, the former Foreign Minister of Italy, returned to his homeland after an exile of fifteen years.
- Four provinces of Japanese-occupied British Malaya (Kedah, Perlis, Kelantan and Trengganu) were transferred by Japan to the Kingdom of Thailand, pursuant to a treaty signed between the two monarchies on to be made part of Thailand. Thai administration would begin on August 20.
- Perry Mason, based on the novels of Erle Stanley Gardner, was first broadcast as a 15-minute-long daytime radio show on the CBS Radio Network. The show would run on radio until December 20, 1955.

== October 19, 1943 (Tuesday) ==
- The antibiotic Streptomycin was first isolated in a laboratory, by Albert Schatz, a 23-year-old student at Rutgers University. Schatz was working for Professor Selman Waksman, who gave the new medicine, developed from a culture of the bacteria Actinomyces griseus, which was able to kill certain bacteria that could not be treated with penicillin. Treatment for human patients would be approved in 1946.
- The first exchange of prisoners of war, between the United Kingdom and Germany, began in Sweden at the port of Goteborg. A group of 4,340 POWs from Allied nations, released because of illness and injuries, arrived by trains and on hospital ships from Germany; most had been imprisoned for more than three years, including 17 Americans. Later in the day, 835 German prisoners arrived on two British liners, with more due to arrive later in the week. The exchange was supervised by the Swedish Red Cross.
- Allied aircraft sank the German-controlled cargo ship MS Sinfra in the Mediterranean, killing over 2,000 people, mostly Italian military internees.
- African-American actor Paul Robeson made his Broadway theater debut, portraying the title character in a revival of Shakespeare's Othello.
- Died: Camille Claudel, 78, French sculptor

== October 20, 1943 (Wednesday) ==
- A U.S. Navy PBY Catalina flying boat and an Imperial Japanese Navy Mitsubishi G4M (Allied reporting name "Betty") bomber exchanged fire off Attu. As the last air combat action in the Alaska Territory's Aleutian Islands, the incident also marked the last combat fought in any of the fifty United States.
- Eighty-eight people were killed by an explosion and fire that happened when two gasoline tanker ships collided off of the coast of Palm Beach, Florida. The two vessels, an empty tanker with 73 people on board and a fully loaded ship with a full load of gasoline and a crew of 43, had been unable to see each other because they were blacked out as a precaution against a submarine attack. There were only 28 survivors, most of whom had been able to jump overboard and swim away from the burning pool of aviation fuel.
- The United Nations War Crimes Commission was established by the representatives of 17 Allied nations at a meeting in London.
- Viscount Wavell of Cyrenaica and Winchester was sworn in as the new Viceroy of India.
- The German submarine U-378 was depth charged and sunk in the Atlantic Ocean by American aircraft.
- The Yugoslav steamship Bojana, sailing from Durrës, sank south of Cape Đerane near Ulcinj after being hit by a British submarine.
- Born: Noreen Corcoran, American television actress who was the co-star (with John Forsythe) of the 1950s show Bachelor Father; in Quincy, Massachusetts (d. 2016)

== October 21, 1943 (Thursday) ==
Flag of "Free India"

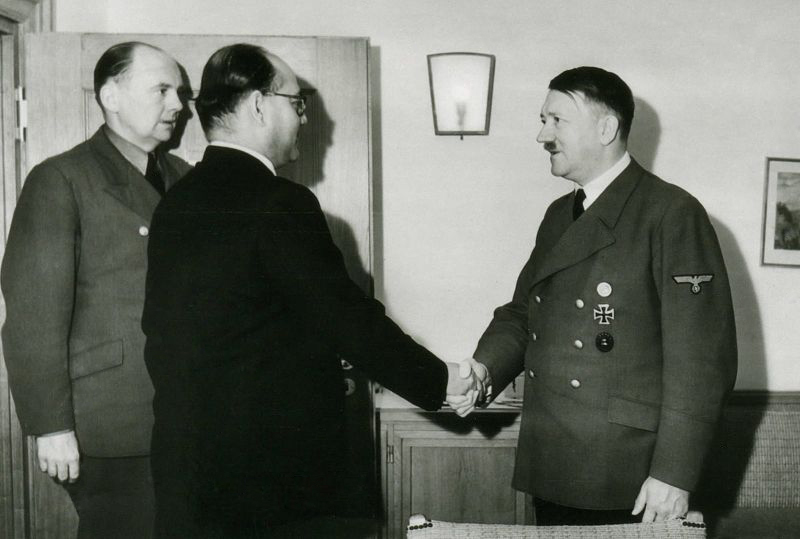
Bose meeting Adolf Hitler

- "The Provisional Government of Azad Hind" (literally, "Free India") was proclaimed, with Subhas Chandra Bose as President, in those territories of British India that had been captured by Japan. The Japanese government provided the Andaman and Nicobar Islands to the new state. At the same time, Bose announced that Azad Hind was joining Japan in the war against the U.S. and the U.K.
- German forces, retreating from the Byelorussian SSR, began the liquidation of the Minsk Ghetto. Over a period of 12 days, more than 2,000 Jewish residents were deported to the Maly Trostenets extermination camp outside of the city.
- As Japan began the drafting of high school and university students into its armed forces, the first parade of newly drafted shutsujin was held. A group of 25,000 students, from 77 schools, marched past the Meiji Shrine in Tokyo, with Prime Minister Hideki Tojo and Education Minister Nagakage Okabe reviewing the new recruits.
- The British Royal Air Force delivered a highly destructive airstrike on the German industrial and population center of Kassel.
- After 18 months, the 140,000 Jews of French Algeria were restored to French citizenship. General Henri Giraud had revoked the group's historic standing on March 17, 1942, placing the Algerian Jews under the same restriction that had existed for Algerian Arabs since the French conquest of Algeria. The Arab residents of Algeria were still required to file an application if they wished to become citizens of France.
- The American destroyer USS Murphy collided with the British tanker Bulkoil off the coast of New Jersey and was severely damaged. The stern section was repaired and she was returned to service in time to participate in Operation Overlord.
- The German submarine U-431 was depth charged and sunk off Algiers by a Vickers Wellington of No. 179 Squadron RAF.
- Born: Tariq Ali, Pakistani filmmaker and journalist; in Lahore, British India
- Died: Sir Dudley Pound, 66, British Admiral of the Fleet and First Sea Lord, died 16 days after his resignation for illness.

== October 22, 1943 (Friday) ==
- Ten thousand residents, mostly German civilians, were killed as the city of Kassel was leveled by ten squadrons of the Royal Air Force, with 569 planes, dropped 416,000 incendiary bombs on the older section of town during extremely dry weather, fires swept the city center within 15 minutes, and became a firestorm that peaked after 45 minutes. Although more people had died in the July 27 and 28 attack on Hamburg, a higher percentage of the population (4.42%, more than one in 25 people) died in the attack.
- As part of the bombing of Kassel, the RAF launched Operation Corona, an attempt to confuse German night-fighters by having native German speakers impersonate German Air Defence officers.
- Thirteen of the 15 people aboard a Swedish airliner were killed after the plane was shot down by "an unidentified warplane". The airliner came under fire for ten minutes and crashed on the island of Holloe.
- The British destroyer Hurworth struck a mine and sank in the Aegean Sea.
- German-American circus performer Aloysius Peters, billed as "The Great Peters" and "The Man With the Iron Neck", was killed when his signature stunt went wrong at the Fireman's Wild West Rodeo and Thrill Circus in St. Louis, Missouri. Peters' act involved leaping from a trapeze bar with a noose around his neck made from an elastic rope. The rope Peters used at his final performance was of inferior wartime quality, affecting his timing, and his neck was broken.
- The Battle of Sept-Îles was fought over the night of October 22–23 near the French coast in the English Channel between British and German naval forces. The result was a German victory as the British cruiser Charybdis was torpedoed and sunk in the Bay of Biscay by German torpedo boats.
- The German submarine U-537 arrived at Martin Bay on the Labrador Peninsula to set up an automatic weather station - Weather Station Kurt. This was the only armed German military operation on land in North America in World War II.
- Born: Catherine Deneuve, French film actress; as Catherine Dorleac in Paris
- Died: Sir William Reginald Hall, 73, British Admiral and Director of the Naval Intelligence Division

== October 23, 1943 (Saturday) ==
- The Soviet 28th Army drove the German 6th Army out of Melitopol (Melitopol Offensive).
- The German submarine U-274 was depth charged and sunk in the Atlantic Ocean by British warships and aircraft.
- The Swedish government decided that for the fourth straight year, the Nobel Prizes would not be awarded.
- Born: Alida Chelli, Italian actress and singer, in Carpi, Emilia-Romagna (d. 2012)
- Died: Ben Bernie, 52, American jazz violinist and NBC Radio show host nicknamed "The Old Maestro"

== October 24, 1943 (Sunday) ==
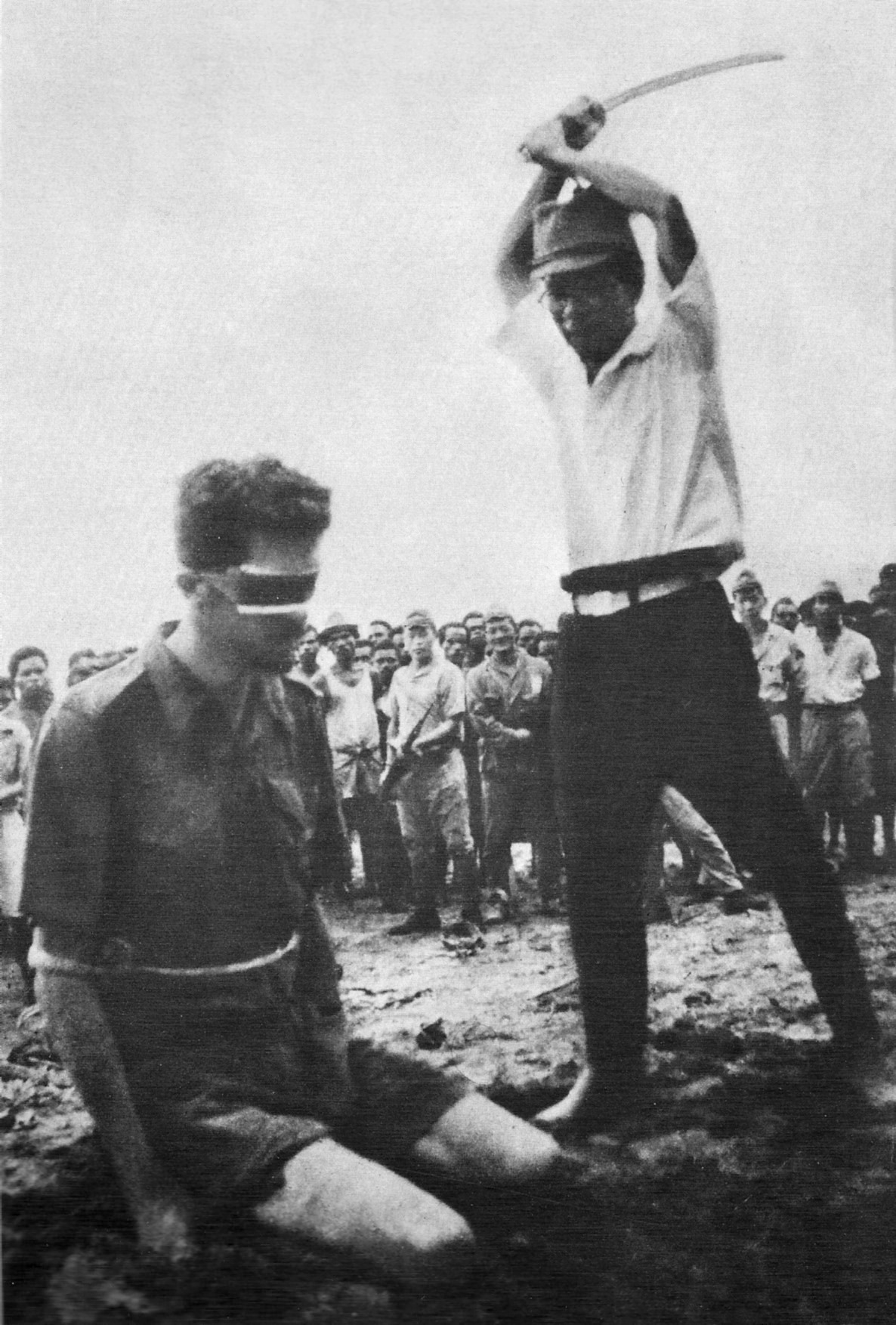
October 24, 1943: Beheading of Leonard George Siffleet.

- Soldatensender Calais, also known as "Soldiers' Radio Calais", went on the air at 5:57 pm. Operating on the same frequency as Radio Deutschland, Germany's national radio station, Radio Calais would begin transmission whenever Radio Deutschland was off the air during bombing raids.
- The Battle of Finschhafen ended in Allied victory.
- The British Royal Navy destroyer HMS Eclipse (H08) was sunk by a mine in the Aegean Sea with the loss of 119 of the ship's company and 134 troops.
- The Japanese destroyer Mochizuki was bombed and sunk in the Solomon Sea southwest of Rabaul by American Consolidated PBY Catalina aircraft.
- The German submarine U-566 was depth charged and sunk in the Atlantic Ocean by a Vickers Wellington of No. 179 Squadron RAF.
- Died: Leonard Siffleet, 27, Australian commando, executed by beheading. A photograph taken of the moment just before the beheading became one of the most enduring images of World War II.

== October 25, 1943 (Monday) ==
- The 3rd Ukrainian Front captured Dnepropetrovsk.
- Four years after being introduced as a superhero in Detective Comics issue #27 (May, 1939), Batman reached a larger audience with the debut of the newspaper comic strip "Batman and Robin", authored by Bob Kane.

== October 26, 1943 (Tuesday) ==
- U.S. President Roosevelt issued Presidential Proclamation 2597, extending draft registration beyond the 48 states. Thereafter, all American men aged 18–44, living in the territories of Alaska, Hawaii or Puerto Rico, were required to register before the end of the year.
- The German Dornier Do 335 heavy fighter had its first flight.
- Died: Aurel Stein, 80, Hungarian-born British archaeologist

== October 27, 1943 (Wednesday) ==
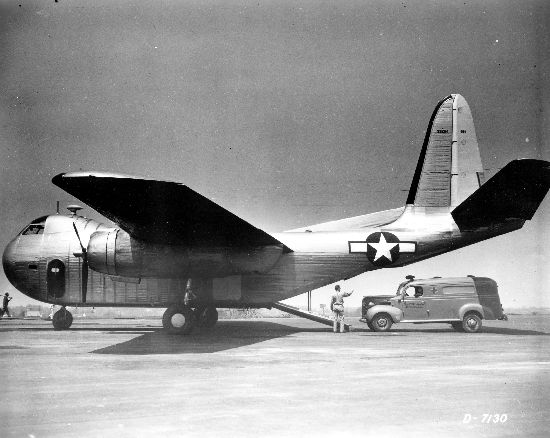
Stainless steel Conestoga airplane

- The first stainless steel airplane, the RB-1 Conestoga cargo plane, flew for the first time. The Budd Company, which had manufactured stainless steel trains before the war, was only able to build 25 Conestogas before price increases and production problems led to their contract being cancelled.
- In Argentina, Colonel Juan Perón advanced his career by agreeing to direct the nation's Department of Labor. Over the next three years, he would push through social reforms and form an alliance with the nation's labor unions, then be elected President of Argentina on February 24, 1946.
- British 2nd Special Air Service successfully carried out Operation Candytuft, a raid on the Italian cities of Ancona and Pescara. That same night four small Special Air Service teams executed Operation Saxifrage, cutting the rail line between the two cities.
- The Battle of the Treasury Islands began in the Solomons.

== October 28, 1943 (Thursday) ==
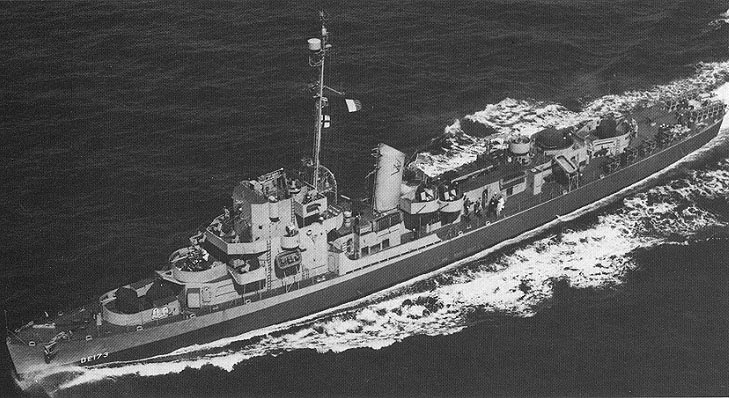
"Teleported" or "invisible" USS Eldridge

- In the "Philadelphia Experiment", a story widely believed to be a hoax, the destroyer escort USS Eldridge (DE-173) was supposedly rendered invisible to human observers for a brief period, and (in some versions of the story) even teleported from the Philadelphia Naval Shipyard to the U.S. Navy shipyard in Norfolk, Virginia and back, with the result that several of the people on board were seriously injured, went insane, or killed. The story would be popularized by the bestselling 1974 book The Bermuda Triangle, by Charles Berlitz, and the U.S. Navy began receiving regular inquiries. In 1979, Berlitz and William L. Moore would write a more detailed account in The Philadelphia Experiment: Project Invisibility, by which time the Navy would have a standard response: "As for the Philadelphia Experiment, the ONR (Office of Naval Research) has never conducted any investigations on invisibility, either in 1943 or at any other time. In view of present scientific knowledge, our scientists do not believe that such an experiment could be possible except in the realm of science fiction."
- The Allied Raid on Choiseul in the Solomons began.
- The German submarine U-220 was depth charged and sunk in the Atlantic Ocean by U.S. aircraft from the escort carrier Block Island.

== October 29, 1943 (Friday) ==
- Robert Dorsay, 39, German character actor and comedian, was executed in Germany after being convicted of "ongoing activity hostile to the Reich and serious undermining of the German defense effort". In March, Dorsay had been overheard by a Gestapo informer, while joking about the government. When his mail and home was searched, an unsent letter was found in which Dorsay made fun of the Nazi Party and described the continued German war effort as "idiotic".
- The German submarine U-282 was depth charged and sunk in the North Atlantic by British warships.

== October 30, 1943 (Saturday) ==
- The Moscow Declaration was made by U.S. Secretary of State Cordell Hull, British Foreign Secretary Anthony Eden, Soviet premier Joseph Stalin and Fu Bingchang, the ambassador to the USSR from the Republic of China government (based in Beijing), who signed on behalf of China.

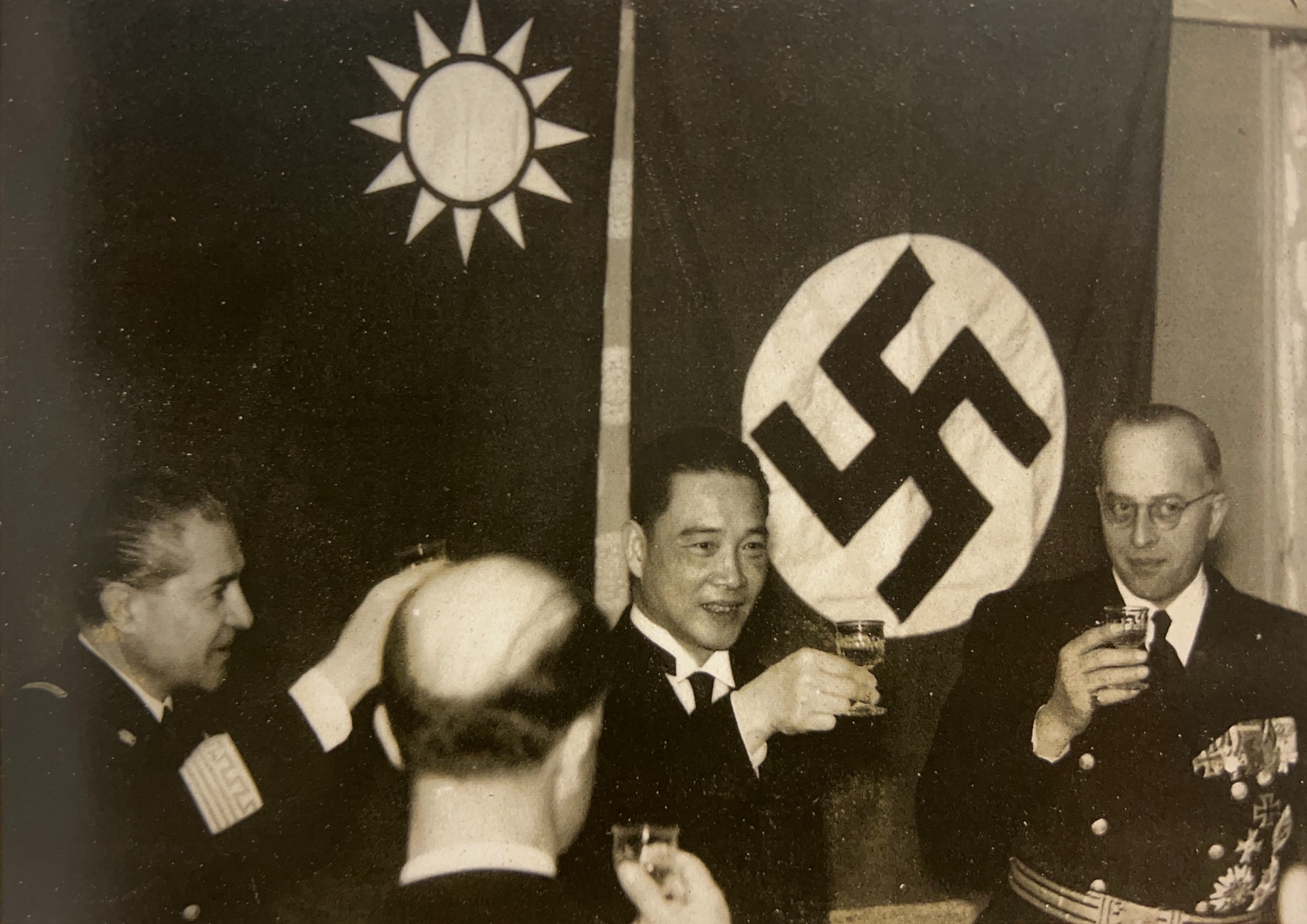
Axis China Chairman Wang Jingwei

- The Japanese-controlled Chinese Republic, with its capital at Nanjing, signed a treaty with the Empire of Japan. Wang Jingwei, the Chairman of the puppet state, signed an agreement in Tokyo with Japan's Foreign Minister, Shigenori Tōgō, that provided that Japan would withdraw all of its troops from China at the end of World War II.
- Gus Bodnar scored a goal only 15 seconds after starting his National Hockey League career, setting a league record that still stands for fastest goal by a rookie. Bodnar, playing for the Toronto Maple Leafs, was playing against the New York Rangers.
- "Pistol Packin' Mama" by Al Dexter topped the Billboard singles chart.
- Died: Max Reinhardt, 70, Austrian-born American stage and film director

== October 31, 1943 (Sunday) ==
- The Red Army cut the Germans' rail link to the Crimea by capturing Chaplynka.
- The Soviet IS-2 tank was accepted for service in the Soviet Army.
- The German submarines U-306, U-584 and U-732 were all lost to enemy action in the Atlantic Ocean.
- Born: G. Madhavan Nair, Chairman of Indian Space Research Organisation and Secretary to the Department of Space, Government of India from 2003 to 2009; in Kulasekaram, Tamil Nadu
