= Convoy SC 143 =

Convoy during naval battles of the Second World War

- Part of World War II
Date	October 1943
Location	North Atlantic
Result	Allied operational victory

Belligerents
United Kingdom; Canada; Poland	Germany

Commanders and leaders
Comm: Escort	Admiral Karl Dönitz

Strength
SC 143: 39 ships 8 escorts SG 10 : 4 warships	Rossbach: 14 U-boats

Casualties and losses
1 ship sunk 1 warship sunk	3 U-boats

SC 143 was a North Atlantic convoy of the SC series which ran during the battle of the Atlantic in World War II. It was the second battle in the Kriegsmarine's autumn offensive in the North Atlantic.

== Background ==
Following the attack on convoys ONS 18 and ON 202 by the wolfpack Leuthen, U-boat Control (Befehlshaber der Unterseeboote (BdU) was convinced of success and eager to continue the offensive. Accordingly, they re-organized the boats then in the North Atlantic into a new patrol line, the 12 remaining Leuthen boats being joined by 9 newcomers, from bases in France and Germany. Code-named Rossbach, the group was stationed at the western edge of the Greenland Air Gap to intercept the expected east-bound convoys, carrying materiel for the invasion of Europe.

For their part, the Allies were also encouraged by the outcome of the battle for ONS 18/ON 202, and were keen to seek battle with group Rossbach.

While forming, Rossbach came under attack by air patrols; four boats were destroyed, and another four were damaged and forced to return to base. Three others were damaged, but were able to continue operations, while a further two boats arrived from base as re-inforcement.

== Protagonists ==
SC 143 left Halifax on 28 September 1943 bound for Liverpool It was composed of 39 ships and was escorted by C-2 escort group comprising the destroyer HMS Icarus, frigate Duckworth and 5 corvettes. Also accompanying the convoy was the MAC carrier Rapana.

By 6 October Rossbach, comprising fourteen U-boats at this point, was deployed to intercept the expected west-bound convoys, HX 259 and SC 143.

Western Approaches Command became aware of Rossbach's position via intelligence, principally Enigma decrypts, but decided to engage the wolfpack and force a battle. Diverting HX 259 to the south, SC 143 was reinforced with 10th Support Group, of four destroyers, Musketeer, Oribi, Orkan and Orwell, and allowed to continue towards Rossbach as bait.

== Action ==
SC 143 was sighted on 8 October by U-731, which was returning to base following an air attack; she sent a sighting report, and throughout the day the Rossbach boats converged on the position.

Seven boats had gathered by evening, and at nightfall mounted their attack.

During the night of 8/9 October the seven Rossbach boats were able to attack; U-645 torpedoed and sank Yorkmar, and U-378 hit ORP Orkan which sank with the loss of 157 men. This was the worst naval loss suffered by the Polish Navy during the war.

During the day the convoys air cover was able to mount several successful attacks; three U-boats were attacked by aircraft during the day. U-419 was attacked and sunk by a Liberator from No. 86 Squadron RAF; U-643 was damaged by 2 other Liberators, from 86 Sqdn RAF and No. 120 Squadron RAF; it was later caught on the surface by another Liberator of RAF 86 Sqdn and sunk. U-610 was attacked by a Sunderland from 423 Sqdn RCAF and sunk.

Two other boats were damaged in air attacks and forced to return to base; U-539 by an unidentified aircraft, and U-762 by a Liberator of No. 120 Squadron RAF.

Following this the attack was discontinued by BdU and Rossbach, now reduced to six boats, was disbanded. SC 143 continued its voyage, and arrived without further loss at Liverpool on 12 October 1943.

== Conclusion ==
Undeterred by the poor result of this attack, and the losses suffered by Rossbach, BdU wished to press on with the offensive; the remaining Rossbach boats were reinforced to form a new group code-named Schlieffen.

== Tables ==
=== Allied ships sunk ===
Date	Name	Flag	Casualties	Tonnage	Sunk by...
9 Oct 1943	Yorkmar	United States	13	5,612	U-645

=== Allied warships sunk ===
Date	Name	Flag	Casualties	Type	Sunk by...
8 Oct 1943	Orkan	Poland	157	Destroyer	U-378

=== Axis submarines destroyed ===
Date	Number	Type	Location	Casualties	Sunk by...
8 Oct 1943	U-419	VIIC	North Atlantic; 56°31′N 27°05′W	48	Air attack by Liberator R 86 Sqdn
8 Oct 1943	U-643	VIIC	Atlantic, S of Iceland; 56°14′N 26°55′W	30	Air attack by Liberator R 86 Sqdn; Liberator Z 86 Sqdn; Liberator T 120 Sqdn
8 Oct 1943	U-610	VIIC	Atlantic, SW of Rockall; 55°45′N 24°33′W	51	Air attack by Sunderland J 423 Sqdn; RCAF
