= Wolfpack Rossbach =

Wolfpack of German U-Boats

Rossbach was a wolfpack of German U-boats that operated during the battle of the Atlantic in World War II. Seven of its 21 U-boats were sunk and another seven damaged, four of which were forced to return to base, before the wolfpack was disbanded.

== Service history ==
Rossbach was formed in October 1943 to operate against the North Atlantic convoy routes and comprised 21 boats. It consisted of 12 boats from the disbanded group Leuthen, plus 9 others from bases in France and Germany.

Whilst forming, several boats from Rossbach were detected and attacked by air patrols; 4 were sunk (U-221, U-279, U-389, and U-336) and another 4 were damaged (U-260, U-305, U-666 and U-731), forcing them to return to base. A further 3 were damaged, but were able to continue, while 2 more boats arrived from base as reinforcement.

On 8/9 October 1943 Rossbach, attacked convoy SC 143. They sank one ship of 5,612 gross register tons (GRT) and one warship but lost 3 boats (U-419, U-610 and U-643) in the engagement.

Rossbach was disbanded following this attack; the remaining boats formed the core of a new group, codenamed Schlieffen.

== U-boats involved ==
- U-91
- U-260
- U-275
- U-279
- U-305
- U-309
- U-336
- U-378
- U-389
- U-402
- U-419
- U-448
- U-539
- U-584
- U-603
- U-610
- U-631
- U-641
- U-643
- U-645
- U-666
- U-731
- U-758
- U-762
- U-952

== The name ==
Rossbach was a reference to the Battle of Rossbach fought by Frederick the Great during the Seven Years' War.
