= No. 269 Squadron RAF =

Defunct flying squadron of the Royal Air Force

- The official No. 269 Squadron badge
- Active: 6 October 1918 – 15 November 1919; 7 December 1936 – 10 March 1946; 1 January 1952 – 24 May 1963
- Country: United Kingdom
- Branch: Royal Air Force
- Type: Flying squadron
- Part of: RAF Coastal Command
- Mottos: Latin: Omnia videmus ("We see all things")
- Engagements: World War I World War II; Battle of the Atlantic; Cold War

Insignia
- Squadron Badge: An ancient ship in full sail
- Squadron Codes: KL (Apr 1939 - Sep 1939); UA (Sep 1939 - Jan 1944); HK (Oct 1944 - Mar 1946)

No. 269 Squadron RAF was a maritime patrol unit of the Royal Air Force that saw service in World War I, World War II, and the Cold War.

== Service history ==
=== World War I ===
On 6 October 1918, No. 269 Squadron was formed from Nos. 431 and 432 Flights at the seaplane station based at Port Said which had been established there since January 1916, under the command of Major P.L Holmes, RAF. No. 269 was part 64th Wing, and it operated seaplanes from the harbor, plus land-based flight of B.E.2e and Airco DH.9 aircraft. The squadron conducted maritime patrols until the Armistice, and on 15 September 1919, its seaplanes were moved to RAF Alexandria and merged with No. 270 Squadron as its landplane flight had been disbanded in March 1919. The squadron continued as No. 269 until it was disbanded on 15 November 1919.

=== Inter-war Period ===
On 7 December 1936, C Flight of No. 206 Squadron at RAF Bircham Newton was redesignated 269 Squadron. The squadron was moved to RAF Abbotsinch, near Glasgow, later that month, and its Avro Anson aircraft undertook coastal reconnaissance patrols. On 9 March 1939, the squadron moved to RAF Montrose and began flying maritime patrols off the east coast of Scotland.

=== World War II ===
==== 1939 ====
No. 269 Squadron was transferred to RAF Wick on 10 October 1939, and executed aerial attacks against surfaced German U-boats on 15 September, 18 October, 28 October, 3 November, 19 November, and 3 December. Postwar examination of Kriegsmarine records showed that these attacks either did little damage or a U-boat was not on patrol in the area of attack.

==== 1940 ====
Aircraft from No. 269 Squadron made six separate attacks on German U-boats during February 1940, plus attacks on 8 August. No. 269 Squadron also carried out a number of missions in addition to its maritime patrol duties:

- 1 March — The Stavanger airfield was attacked.
- 11 June — The German battleships Scharnhorst, Gneisenau and Admiral Hipper were attacked while at anchor in Trondheim harbor.
- 22 June — Aircraft from the No. 269 Squadron and No. 442 Squadron RAF attacked the German battleship Scharnhorst while at sea north of Bergen, but inflicted little damage on the German warship.
- 27 June — No. 269 Squadron executed a special mission reconnaissance of Norwegian coast.

The squadron also began receiving new Lockheed Hudson patrol bombers starting in March 1940, completing the transition on 15 April, while it ceased operating Avro Anson aircraft as of 1 June. By 15 July, No, 269 Squadron was fully operational with 18 Hudson Mk1 aircraft.

==== 1941 ====
After a year of operations against enemy shipping from RAF Wick, No. 269 Squadron began transferring to Iceland starting on 12 April 1941, with the last Hudson aircraft arriving on 30 May. The squadron completed its re-deployment to Iceland on 10 July. A detachment of No. 269 Squadron deployed to RAF Reykjavik on 12 December.

On 9 April, six aircraft from RAF Wick bombed the aluminium factory at Hoyanger, Norway. Also during late May, the squadron participated in the hunt for the German battleship Bismarck. Aircraft from No. 269 Squadron also made four attacks on surfaced U-boats during June. On 6 August, Hudson patrol bombers from No. 269 Squadron escorted USAF fighter aircraft of the 33rd Pursuit Squadron to the Reykjavik airfield after being catapulted off the aircraft carrier USS Wasp. On 16 August, No. 269 Squadron flew twelve sorties escorting the battleship HMS Prince of Wales, with the Prime Minister, Winston Churchill, aboard for the secret conference with U.S. President Franklin D. Roosevelt. Aircraft from No. 269 Squadron made separate attacks on surfaced U-boats during June. Aircraft of the No. 269 Squadron also attacked U-432 on 29 August, U-85 on 2 September, U-439 and U-552 on 14 September and they were also present during the Greer Incident.

On 27 August 1941, Squadron Leader J.H. Thompson of the No. 269 Squadron made RAF history by becoming the only aircraft captain to have a U-boat (U-570) surrender to him. Thompson and his navigator/bomb-aimer—Flying Officer John Coleman—were awarded the Distinguished Flying Cross on 23 September 1941.

==== 1942 ====
Aircraft of the No. 269 Squadron attacked U-510 on 14 July, U-609 on 23 July, U-164 and U-210 on 26 July, and U-595 on 30 July and 31 July. No. 269 aircraft made eight separate U-boat attacks during August. Six U-boats were attacked during September. U-183 was attacked on 3 October. No. 269 Squadron scored its first confirmed U-boat kill by sinking U-619 on 5 October.

==== 1943 ====
No. 269 Squadron attacked four U-boats during January, and Four Hudson aircraft were deployed to the Bluie West One airfield in Greenland on 29 January. No. 269 Squadron attacked three U-boats in April and eight in May, as well as sinking U-646 and U-273 on 17 May and 19 May, respectively. Six U-boats were attacked in June, and No. 269 aircraft sank U-535 on 5 July. Three U-boats were attacked in August. U-336 was sunk on 27 September, and U-539 was attacked. U-275 was attacked on 3 October, U-641 was severely damaged, and sank U-389 on 5 October.

On 13 December, No. 269 Squadron began its temporary transfer from RAF Reykjavik to RAF Davidstow Moor prior to its 1944 deployment to the Azores. The squadron was re-equipped with Supermarine Walrus I and Vickers Warwick I ASRI aircraft, as well as retaining its extant Hudson Mk III patrol aircraft. The squadron also received Miles Martinet I aircraft for target-towing purposes. This transfer was completed on 8 January 1944,

==== 1944 - 1946 ====
No. 269 Squadron completed its deployment to RAF Lagens in the Azores with its Hudson Mk IIIA, Martinet, Walrus and Spitfire Mk V aircraft. The short-range aircraft were launched off the escort aircraft carrier HMS Premier. Later in October, some Warwick aircraft were added to the squadron. For the rest of the war it flew air-sea rescue missions, as well as meteorological and target towing sorties. Following the end of World War II, No. 269 Squadron was disbanded on 10 March 1946.

=== Cold War ===
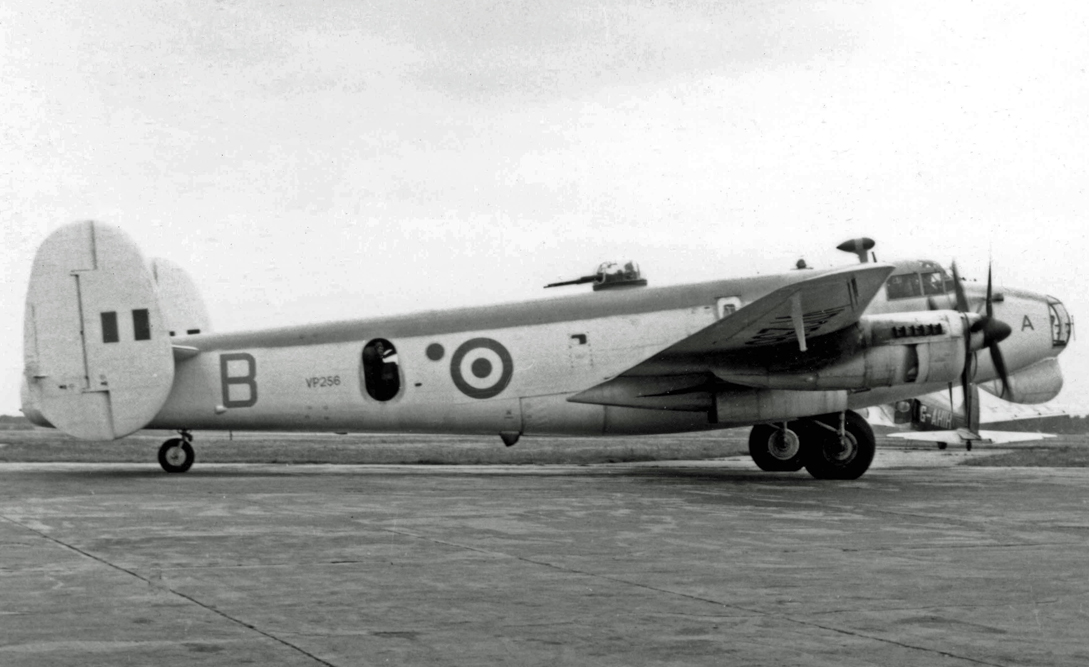
269 Squadron Avro Shackleton MR.1 from RAF Ballykelly in 1953

No. 269 Squadron was reformed at North Front, Gibraltar, on 1 January 1952 from part of No. 224 Squadron and moved on 24 March to RAF Ballykelly, Ulster, as a maritime reconnaissance unit equipped with Avro Shackleton patrol bombers. No. 269 Squadron participated in a number of military exercises, including Exercise Encompass in January 1956 and Operation Mosaic in February 1956, as well as NATO's Operation Strikeback in September 1957. On 1 December 1958 the squadron was re-numbered as No. 210 Squadron. On 22 July 1959, No 269 Squadron reformed at RAF Caistor as a Thor Missile Squadron in Bomber Command as part of the Thor Missile Force based at RAF Hemswell. No. 269 Squadron was disbanded on 24 May 1963.

== Aircraft ==
The following aircraft were assigned to No. 269 Squadron during its operation service arranged in chronological order:

- World War I:
  - Royal Aircraft Factory B.E.2e
    Oct. 1918 to Mar. 1919
  - Short Type 184
    Oct. 1918 to Nov. 1919
  - Airco DH.9
    Dec. 1918 to Mar. 1919

- World War II:
  - Avro Anson I
    Dec. 1936 to Jun. 1940
  - Locheed Hudson I
    Apr. 1940 to May 1941
  - Lockheed Hudson II
    Oct. 1940 to May 1941
  - Locheed Hudson III
    May 1941 to Dec. 1943
  - Lockheed Hudson IIIA
    Feb. 1944 to Aug. 1945
  - Spitfire VB
    Feb. 1944 to Mar. 1946
  - Miles Martinet I
    Feb. 1944 to Jul. 1944
  - Supermarine Walrus I
    Feb. 1944 to Mar 1946
  - Vickers Warwick I
    Sept. 1944 to Mar. 1946

- Cold War:
  - Shackleton MR Mk 1
    Jan. 1952 to Nov. 1958
  - Shackleton MR Mk 2
    Mar. 1952 to Aug. 1954
    Oct. 1958 to Nov. 1958
  - PGM-17 Thor
    Jul. 1959 to May 1963

== Cultural references ==
The band Sod's Opera references to this unit in their song Ain't the air Force fucking awful when they say "And Two Six Nine will be there 'til they're fucking well forgotten"
