= German submarine U-539 =

German World War II submarine

History

Nazi Germany
- Name: U-539
- Ordered: 5 June 1941
- Builder: Deutsche Werft, Hamburg
- Yard number: 360
- Laid down: 8 May 1942
- Launched: 4 December 1942
- Commissioned: 24 February 1943
- Fate: Surrendered on 9 May 1945; Foundered on 4 December 1945

General characteristics
- Class & type: Type IXC/40 submarine
- Displacement: 1,144 t (1,126 long tons) surfaced; 1,257 t (1,237 long tons) submerged
- Length: 76.76 m (251 ft 10 in) o/a; 58.75 m (192 ft 9 in) pressure hull
- Beam: 6.86 m (22 ft 6 in) o/a; 4.44 m (14 ft 7 in) pressure hull
- Height: 9.60 m (31 ft 6 in)
- Draught: 4.67 m (15 ft 4 in)
- Installed power: 4,400 PS (3,200 kW; 4,300 bhp) (diesels); 1,000 PS (740 kW; 990 shp) (electric)
- Propulsion: 2 shafts; 2 × diesel engines; 2 × electric motors
- Speed: 18.3 knots (33.9 km/h; 21.1 mph) surfaced; 7.3 knots (13.5 km/h; 8.4 mph) submerged
- Range: 13,850 nmi (25,650 km; 15,940 mi) at 10 knots (19 km/h; 12 mph) surfaced; 63 nmi (117 km; 72 mi) at 4 knots (7.4 km/h; 4.6 mph) submerged
- Test depth: 230 m (750 ft)
- Complement: 4 officers, 44 enlisted
- Armament: 6 × torpedo tubes (4 bow, 2 stern); 22 × 53.3 cm (21 in) torpedoes; 1 × 10.5 cm (4.1 in) SK C/32 deck gun (180 rounds); 1 × 3.7 cm (1.5 in) SK C/30 AA gun; 1 × 2 cm FlaK 30 AA guns

Service record
- Part of: 4th U-boat Flotilla; 24 February – 30 June 1943; 10th U-boat Flotilla; 1 July 1943 – 30 September 1944; 33rd U-boat Flotilla; 1 October 1944 – 8 May 1945
- Identification codes: M 50 416
- Commanders: Kptlt. Hans-Jürgen Lauterbach-Emden; 24 February 1943 – 9 May 1945
- Operations: 3 patrols: 1st patrol: 14 September – 23 October 1943; 2nd patrol: a. 29 – 30 December 1943; b. 2 January – 21 March 1944; 3rd patrol: a. 1 May – 22 September 1944; b. 13 – 20 April 1945; c. 26 April – 5 May 1945
- Victories: 1 merchant ship sunk (1,517 GRT); 2 merchant ships damaged (12,896 GRT)

German submarine U-539 was a Type IXC/40 U-boat of Nazi Germany's Kriegsmarine during World War II. The submarine was laid down on 8 May 1942 at the Deutsche Werft yard in Hamburg as yard number 360, launched on 4 December 1942, and commissioned on 24 February 1943 under the command of Oberleutnant zur See Hans-Jürgen Lauterbach-Emden. After training with the 4th U-boat Flotilla in the Baltic Sea, the boat was transferred to the 10th U-boat Flotilla for front-line service on 1 July 1943. She carried out three war patrols, sinking one ship and damaged two more. Transferred to the 33rd U-boat Flotilla on 1 October 1944, she sailed on no further patrols, and surrendered to Allied forces on 9 May 1945. Transferred from Bergen, Norway, to Loch Ryan, Scotland, she foundered on 4 December 1945 while being towed to the scuttling grounds as part of "Operation Deadlight".

== Design ==
German Type IXC/40 submarines were slightly larger than the original Type IXCs. U-539 had a displacement of 1,144 tonnes (1,126 long tons) when at the surface and 1,257 tonnes (1,237 long tons) while submerged. The U-boat had a total length of 76.76 m (251 ft 10 in), a pressure hull length of 58.75 m (192 ft 9 in), a beam of 6.86 m (22 ft 6 in), a height of 9.60 m (31 ft 6 in), and a draught of 4.67 m (15 ft 4 in). The submarine was powered by two MAN M 9 V 40/46 supercharged four-stroke, nine-cylinder diesel engines producing a total of 4,400 metric horsepower (3,240 kW; 4,340 shp) for use while surfaced, two Siemens-Schuckert 2 GU 345/34 double-acting electric motors producing a total of 1,000 shaft horsepower (1,010 PS; 750 kW) for use while submerged. She had two shafts and two 1.92 m (6 ft) propellers. The boat was capable of operating at depths of up to 230 metres (750 ft).

The submarine had a maximum surface speed of 18.3 knots (33.9 km/h; 21.1 mph) and a maximum submerged speed of 7.3 knots (13.5 km/h; 8.4 mph). When submerged, the boat could operate for 63 nautical miles (117 km; 72 mi) at 4 knots (7.4 km/h; 4.6 mph); when surfaced, she could travel 13,850 nautical miles (25,650 km; 15,940 mi) at 10 knots (19 km/h; 12 mph). U-539 was fitted with six 53.3 cm (21 in) torpedo tubes (four fitted at the bow and two at the stern), 22 torpedoes, one 10.5 cm (4.13 in) SK C/32 naval gun, 180 rounds, and a 3.7 cm (1.5 in) SK C/30 as well as a 2 cm (0.79 in) C/30 anti-aircraft gun. The boat had a complement of forty-eight.

== Service history ==
=== First patrol ===
The U-boat sailed from Kiel on 4 September 1943 for a three-day voyage to Bergen, before commencing her first war patrol on the 14th. U-539 sailed out into the north Atlantic, and patrolled the waters between Iceland and Greenland. She had no successes, and was attacked by aircraft three times.

On 21 September the U-boat was attacked by a British Lockheed Hudson bomber of No. 269 Squadron RAF, southeast of Iceland. The submarine avoided the aircraft's bombs and depth charges, and escaped by diving. On 4 October a British B-24 Liberator bomber of 120 Squadron, escorting Convoy ONS 19 attacked, but was hit by the U-boat's flak, setting both starboard engines on fire and causing it to crash, killing all eight crew. The aircraft's depth charges caused only minor damage, and a crewman was slightly wounded by strafing. Finally, on 8 October, an unknown Liberator southeast of Greenland dropped two depth charges, causing serious damage to the U-boat.

The U-boat arrived at Lorient in occupied France on 23 October 1943 after 40 days at sea.

=== Second patrol ===
U-539 departed Lorient on 2 January 1944, as the first U-boat to sail on combat patrol equipped with the Schnorchel breathing device. She sailed across the Atlantic to the waters south of Newfoundland, but had no successes. She returned to Saint-Nazaire on 21 March.

=== Third patrol ===
The U-boat departed from Saint-Nazaire for her third and final war patrol on 1 May 1944. She sailed back across the Atlantic and into the Caribbean Sea. There, on 5 June, she torpedoed and sank the 1,517 GRT Panama-registered Danish ship Pillory off Puerto Rico with the loss of 25 from her crew of 47.

On 11 June, she fired two torpedoes at the 2,701 GRT Dutch tanker Casandra, before surfacing to fire at the ship with her deck gun. However the ship fought back and damaged the U-boat with machine-gun fire, forcing her to break off the attack.

The next day, 12 June, an American Mariner patrol bomber attacked the U-boat, but she got away once again.

On 4 July, the U-539, attacked the 10,195 GRT American Type T2 tanker Kittanning, about 40 miles northeast of Cristóbal, Panama, and hit her with three torpedoes, ripping a hole 65 feet long and 20 feet high on her starboard side. The crew of 74 abandoned ship in four lifeboats, but the tanker remained afloat. Two Coast Guard cutters, Marion and Crawford arrived to pick up the survivors and take the ship in tow to Cristobal.

U-539 arrived at Flensburg on 22 September, after a patrol lasting 145 days, her longest.

=== Fate ===
In mid-April 1945 U-539 sailed to Horten Naval Base, then to Bergen in early May, arriving there three days before the German surrender on 9 May 1945. The U-boat was transferred from Bergen to Loch Ryan in Scotland on 2 June 1945 for Operation Deadlight. On 4 December 1945, while under tow to the scuttling grounds she foundered in position 55°38′N 07°57′W.

== Summary of raiding history ==
Date	Ship Name	Nationality	Tonnage (GRT)	Fate
5 June 1944	Pillory	Panama	1,517	Sunk
11 June 1944	Casandra	Netherlands	2,701	Damaged
4 July 1944	Kittanning	United States	10,195	Damaged

== Bibliography ==
- Busch, Rainer; Röll, Hans-Joachim (1999). German U-boat commanders of World War II : a biographical dictionary. Translated by Brooks, Geoffrey. London, Annapolis, Md: Greenhill Books, Naval Institute Press. ISBN 1-55750-186-6.
- Busch, Rainer; Röll, Hans-Joachim (1999). Deutsche U-Boot-Verluste von September 1939 bis Mai 1945 [German U-boat losses from September 1939 to May 1945]. Der U-Boot-Krieg (in German). Vol. IV. Hamburg, Berlin, Bonn: Mittler. ISBN 3-8132-0514-2.
- Gröner, Erich; Jung, Dieter; Maass, Martin (1991). U-boats and Mine Warfare Vessels. German Warships 1815–1945. Vol. 2. Translated by Thomas, Keith; Magowan, Rachel. London: Conway Maritime Press. ISBN 0-85177-593-4.
