= German submarine U-610 =

German World War II submarine

History

Nazi Germany
- Name: U-610
- Ordered: 22 May 1940
- Builder: Blohm & Voss, Hamburg
- Yard number: 586
- Laid down: 5 April 1941
- Launched: 24 December 1941
- Commissioned: 19 February 1942
- Fate: Sunk by depth charges on 8 October 1943

General characteristics
- Class & type: Type VIIC submarine
- Displacement: 769 tonnes (757 long tons) surfaced; 871 t (857 long tons) submerged
- Length: 67.10 m (220 ft 2 in) o/a; 50.50 m (165 ft 8 in) pressure hull
- Beam: 6.20 m (20 ft 4 in) o/a; 4.70 m (15 ft 5 in) pressure hull
- Height: 9.60 m (31 ft 6 in)
- Draught: 4.74 m (15 ft 7 in)
- Speed: 17.7 knots (32.8 km/h; 20.4 mph) surfaced; 7.6 knots (14.1 km/h; 8.7 mph) submerged
- Test depth: 230 m (750 ft); Crush depth: 250–295 m (820–968 ft)
- Complement: 4 officers, 40–56 enlisted
- Armament: 5 × 53.3 cm (21 in) torpedo tubes (four bow, one stern); 14 × torpedoes or 26 TMA mines; 1 × 8.8 cm (3.46 in) deck gun (220 rounds); 1 x 2 cm (0.79 in) C/30 AA gun

Service record
- Part of: 5th U-boat Flotilla; 19 February – 30 September 1942; 6th U-boat Flotilla; 1 October 1942 – 8 October 1943
- Identification codes: M 42 489
- Commanders: Kptlt. Walter Freiherr von Freyberg-Eisenberg-Allmendingen; 19 February 1942 – 8 October 1943
- Operations: 4 patrols: 1st patrol: 12 September – 31 October 1942; 2nd patrol: 22 November – 26 December 1942; 3rd patrol: a. 8 March – 12 May 1943; b. 4 – 8 September 1943; 4th patrol: 12 September – 8 October 1943
- Victories: 4 merchant ships sunk (21,273 GRT); 1 merchant ship damaged (9,551 GRT)

German submarine U-610 was a Type VIIC U-boat built for the Nazi Germany's Kriegsmarine for service during World War II. She was laid down on 5 April 1941, launched on 24 December 1941 and commissioned on 19 February 1942. She was sunk on 8 October 1943, having sunk 4 ships and damaging another. Her commander was Kapitänleutnant Walter Freiherr von Freyberg-Eisenberg-Allmendingen.

== Design ==
German Type VIIC submarines were preceded by the shorter Type VIIB submarines. U-610 had a displacement of 769 tonnes (757 long tons) when at the surface and 871 tonnes (857 long tons) while submerged. She had a total length of 67.10 m (220 ft 2 in), a pressure hull length of 50.50 m (165 ft 8 in), a beam of 6.20 m (20 ft 4 in), a height of 9.60 m (31 ft 6 in), and a draught of 4.74 m (15 ft 7 in). The submarine was powered by two Germaniawerft F46 four-stroke, six-cylinder supercharged diesel engines producing a total of 2,800 to 3,200 metric horsepower (2,060 to 2,350 kW; 2,760 to 3,160 shp) for use while surfaced, two BBC GG UB 720/8 double-acting electric motors producing a total of 750 metric horsepower (550 kW; 740 shp) for use while submerged. She had two shafts and two 1.23 m (4 ft) propellers. The boat was capable of operating at depths of up to 230 metres (750 ft).

The submarine had a maximum surface speed of 17.7 knots (32.8 km/h; 20.4 mph) and a maximum submerged speed of 7.6 knots (14.1 km/h; 8.7 mph). When submerged, the boat could operate for 80 nautical miles (150 km; 92 mi) at 4 knots (7.4 km/h; 4.6 mph); when surfaced, she could travel 8,500 nautical miles (15,700 km; 9,800 mi) at 10 knots (19 km/h; 12 mph). U-610 was fitted with five 53.3 cm (21 in) torpedo tubes (four fitted at the bow and one at the stern), fourteen torpedoes, one 8.8 cm (3.46 in) SK C/35 naval gun, 220 rounds, and a 2 cm (0.79 in) C/30 anti-aircraft gun. The boat had a complement of between forty-four and sixty.

== Service history ==
U-610 was built by Blohm & Voss, Hamburg as yard number 586. She was ordered on 22 May 1940 and the keel was laid down on 5 April 1941. U-601 was launched on 24 December 1941.

=== Wolfpacks ===
U-610 took part in nine wolfpacks, namely:

- Luchs (27 September – 6 October 1942)
- Panther (6 – 20 October 1942)
- Draufgänger (29 November – 11 December 1942)
- Ungestüm (11 – 13 December 1942)
- Raufbold (13 – 18 December 1942)
- Dränger (14 – 20 March 1943)
- Seeteufel (23 – 30 March 1943)
- Meise (11 – 27 April 1943)
- Rossbach (24 September – 8 October 1943)

=== Fate ===
On 8 October 1943, while in the North Atlantic Ocean, the U-601 was sunk by a Canadian Sunderland aircraft by depth charges, killing all 51 men on board.

== Summary of raiding history ==
Date	Ship Name	Nationality	Tonnage (GRT)	Fate
29 September 1942	Lifland	United Kingdom	2,254	Sunk
19 October 1942	Steel Navigator	United States	5,718	Sunk
16 December 1942	Bello	Norway	6,125	Sunk
16 December 1942	Regent Lion	United Kingdom	9,551	Damaged
29 March 1943	William Pierce Frye	United States	7,176	Sunk

== Bibliography ==
- Busch, Rainer; Röll, Hans-Joachim (1999). German U-boat commanders of World War II: a biographical dictionary. Translated by Brooks, Geoffrey. London, Annapolis, Md: Greenhill Books, Naval Institute Press. ISBN 1-55750-186-6.
- Busch, Rainer; Röll, Hans-Joachim (1999). Der U-Boot-Krieg, 1939-1945: Deutsche U-Boot-Verluste von September 1939 bis Mai 1945 [German U-boat losses from September 1939 to May 1945] (in German). Vol. IV. Hamburg, Berlin, Bonn: Mittler. ISBN 3-8132-0514-2.
- Gröner, Eric; Jung, Dieter; Maass, Martin (1991). German Warships 1815-1945: U-boats and Mine Warfare Vessels. Vol. 2. Translated by Thomas, Keith; Magowan, Rachel. London: Conway Maritime Press. ISBN 0-85177-593-4.
