= German submarine U-762 =

German World War II submarine

- U-570 Type VIIC submarine that was captured by the British in 1941. This U-boat is almost identical to U-762.

History

Nazi Germany
- Name: U-762
- Ordered: 9 October 1939
- Builder: Kriegsmarinewerft, Wilhelmshaven
- Yard number: 145
- Laid down: 2 January 1941
- Launched: 21 November 1942
- Commissioned: 30 January 1943
- Fate: Sunk on 8 February 1944

General characteristics
- Class & type: Type VIIC submarine
- Displacement: 769 tonnes (757 long tons) surfaced; 871 t (857 long tons) submerged
- Length: 67.10 m (220 ft 2 in) o/a; 50.50 m (165 ft 8 in) pressure hull
- Beam: 6.20 m (20 ft 4 in) o/a; 4.70 m (15 ft 5 in) pressure hull
- Height: 9.60 m (31 ft 6 in)
- Draught: 4.74 m (15 ft 7 in)
- Installed power: 2,800–3,200 PS (2,100–2,400 kW; 2,800–3,200 bhp) (diesels); 750 PS (550 kW; 740 shp) (electric)
- Propulsion: 2 shafts; 2 × diesel engines; 2 × electric motors
- Speed: 17.7 knots (32.8 km/h; 20.4 mph) surfaced; 7.6 knots (14.1 km/h; 8.7 mph) submerged
- Range: 8,500 nmi (15,700 km; 9,800 mi) at 10 knots (19 km/h; 12 mph) surfaced; 80 nmi (150 km; 92 mi) at 4 knots (7.4 km/h; 4.6 mph) submerged
- Test depth: 220 m (720 ft); Crush depth: 250–295 m (820–968 ft)
- Complement: 4 officers, 44–52 enlisted
- Armament: 5 × 53.3 cm (21 in) torpedo tubes (four bow, one stern); 14 × torpedoes or; 26 TMA mines; 1 × 8.8 cm (3.46 in) deck gun (220 rounds); 1 × twin 2 cm (0.79 in) C/30 anti-aircraft gun

Service record
- Part of: 8th U-boat Flotilla; 30 January – 31 July 1943; 9th U-boat Flotilla; 1 August 1943 – 8 February 1944
- Identification codes: M 49 943
- Commanders: Oblt.z.S. / Kptlt. Wolfgang Hille; 30 January – 14 December 1943; Oblt.z.S. Walter Pietschmann; 15 December 1943 – 8 February 1944
- Operations: 2 patrols: 1st patrol: 28 September – 15 November 1943; 2nd patrol: 28 December 1943 – 8 February 1944
- Victories: None

German submarine U-762 was a Type VIIC U-boat of Nazi Germany's Kriegsmarine during World War II.

She was ordered on 9 October 1939, and was laid down on 2 January 1941, at Kriegsmarinewerft, Wilhelmshaven, as yard number 145. She was launched on 21 November 1942, and commissioned under the command of Oberleutnant zur See Wolfgang Hille on 30 January 1943.

== Design ==
German Type VIIC submarines were preceded by the shorter Type VIIB submarines. U-762 had a displacement of 769 tonnes (757 long tons) when at the surface and 871 tonnes (857 long tons) while submerged. She had a total length of 67.10 m (220 ft 2 in), a pressure hull length of 50.50 m (165 ft 8 in), a beam of 6.20 m (20 ft 4 in), a height of 9.60 m (31 ft 6 in), and a draught of 4.74 m (15 ft 7 in). The submarine was powered by two Germaniawerft F46 four-stroke, six-cylinder supercharged diesel engines producing a total of 2,800 to 3,200 metric horsepower (2,060 to 2,350 kW; 2,760 to 3,160 shp) for use while surfaced, two Garbe, Lahmeyer & Co. RP 137/c double-acting electric motors producing a total of 750 metric horsepower (550 kW; 740 shp) for use while submerged. She had two shafts and two 1.23 m (4 ft) propellers. The boat was capable of operating at depths of up to 230 metres (750 ft).

The submarine had a maximum surface speed of 17.7 knots (32.8 km/h; 20.4 mph) and a maximum submerged speed of 7.6 knots (14.1 km/h; 8.7 mph). When submerged, the boat could operate for 80 nautical miles (150 km; 92 mi) at 4 knots (7.4 km/h; 4.6 mph); when surfaced, she could travel 8,500 nautical miles (15,700 km; 9,800 mi) at 10 knots (19 km/h; 12 mph). U-762 was fitted with five 53.3 cm (21 in) torpedo tubes (four fitted at the bow and one at the stern), fourteen torpedoes or 26 TMA mines, one 8.8 cm (3.46 in) SK C/35 naval gun, 220 rounds, and one twin 2 cm (0.79 in) C/30 anti-aircraft gun. The boat had a complement of between 44 — 52 men.

== Service history ==
U-762 participated in two war patrols that yielded no ships sunk or damaged.

On 8 October 1943, eleven days into U-762's first war patrol, she was spotted and attacked by a British B-24 Liberator of 120 Squadron, pilotted by Bryan W. Turnbull. U-762 dove to avoid the attack, which was joined by a destroyer, and managed to escape with only two men wounded and one of her diesel engines damaged.

On 8 February 1944, U-762 was sunk by depth charges dropped by British sloops Woodpecker and Wild Goose. Oblt.z.S. Walter Pietschmann and all 50 crewmen were lost.

The wreck now lies at 49°02′N 16°58′W.

=== Wolfpacks ===
U-762 took part in six wolfpacks, namely:

- Rossbach (6 – 9 October 1943)
- Schlieffen (14 – 22 October 1943)
- Siegfried (22 – 27 October 1943)
- Rügen 1 (6 – 7 January 1944)
- Rügen (7 – 26 January 1944)
- Stürmer (26 January – 3 February 1944)

== Bibliography ==
- Busch, Rainer; Röll, Hans-Joachim (1999). German U-boat commanders of World War II : a biographical dictionary. Translated by Brooks, Geoffrey. London, Annapolis, Md: Greenhill Books, Naval Institute Press. ISBN 1-55750-186-6.
- Busch, Rainer; Röll, Hans-Joachim (1999). Der U-Boot-Krieg, 1939-1945: Deutsche U-Boot-Verluste von September 1939 bis Mai 1945 [German U-boat losses from September 1939 to May 1945] (in German). Vol. IV. Hamburg, Berlin, Bonn: Mittler. ISBN 3-8132-0514-2.
- Gröner, Eric; Jung, Dieter; Maass, Martin (1991). German Warships 1815-1945: U-boats and Mine Warfare Vessels. Vol. 2. Translated by Thomas, Keith; Magowan, Rachel. London: Conway Maritime Press. ISBN 0-85177-593-4.
