= German submarine U-336 =

German World War II submarine

Coordinates: 62°43′N 27°17′W

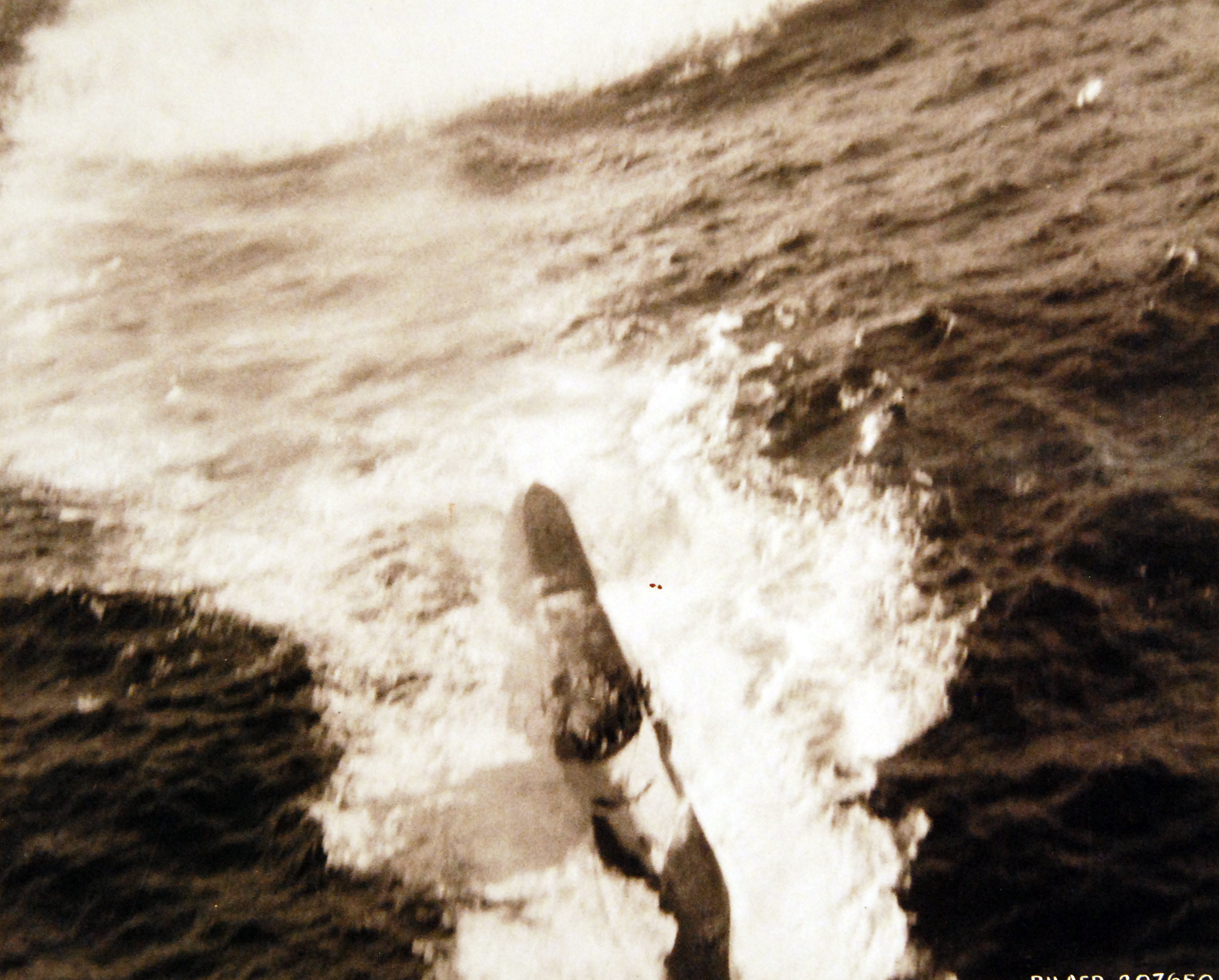
- Aerial attack on U-336 on 3 October 1943

History

Nazi Germany
- Name: U-336
- Ordered: 15 August 1940
- Builder: Nordseewerke, Emden
- Yard number: 208
- Laid down: 28 March 1941
- Launched: 4 December 1941
- Commissioned: 14 February 1942
- Fate: Sunk on 5 October 1943 by a British aircraft

General characteristics
- Class & type: Type VIIC submarine
- Displacement: 769 tonnes (757 long tons) surfaced; 871 t (857 long tons) submerged
- Length: 67.10 m (220 ft 2 in) o/a; 50.50 m (165 ft 8 in) pressure hull
- Beam: 6.20 m (20 ft 4 in) o/a; 4.70 m (15 ft 5 in) pressure hull
- Height: 9.60 m (31 ft 6 in)
- Draught: 4.74 m (15 ft 7 in)
- Installed power: 2,800–3,200 PS (2,100–2,400 kW; 2,800–3,200 bhp) (diesels); 750 PS (550 kW; 740 shp) (electric)
- Propulsion: 2 shafts; 2 × diesel engines; 2 × electric motors
- Speed: 17.7 knots (32.8 km/h; 20.4 mph) surfaced; 7.6 knots (14.1 km/h; 8.7 mph) submerged
- Range: 8,500 nmi (15,700 km; 9,800 mi) at 10 knots (19 km/h; 12 mph) surfaced; 80 nmi (150 km; 92 mi) at 4 knots (7.4 km/h; 4.6 mph) submerged
- Test depth: 230 m (750 ft); Crush depth: 250–295 m (820–968 ft)
- Complement: 4 officers, 40–56 enlisted
- Armament: 5 × 53.3 cm (21 in) torpedo tubes (four bow, one stern); 14 × torpedoes or 26 TMA mines; 1 × 8.8 cm (3.46 in) deck gun (220 rounds); 1 x 2 cm (0.79 in) C/30 AA gun

Service record
- Part of: 5th U-boat Flotilla; 14 February – 30 November 1942; 1st U-boat Flotilla; 1 December 1942 – 5 October 1943
- Identification codes: M 40 923
- Commanders: Kptlt. Hans Hunger; 14 February 1942 – 5 October 1943
- Operations: 5 patrols: 1st patrol: 12 – 13 November 1942; 2nd patrol: 28 November 1942 – 8 January 1943; 3rd patrol: 2 March – 11 April 1943; 4th patrol: a. 8 May – 17 July 1943; b. 26 – 27 August 1943; 5th patrol: 14 September – 5 October 1943
- Victories: 1 merchant ship sunk (4,919 GRT)

German submarine U-336 was a Type VIIC U-boat of Nazi Germany's Kriegsmarine during World War II. The submarine was laid down on 28 March 1941 at the Nordseewerke yard at Emden as yard number 208, launched on 4 December and commissioned on 14 February 1942 under the command of Kapitänleutnant Hans Hunger.

== Design ==
German Type VIIC submarines were preceded by the shorter Type VIIB submarines. U-336 had a displacement of 769 tonnes (757 long tons) when at the surface and 871 tonnes (857 long tons) while submerged. She had a total length of 67.10 m (220 ft 2 in), a pressure hull length of 50.50 m (165 ft 8 in), a beam of 6.20 m (20 ft 4 in), a height of 9.60 m (31 ft 6 in), and a draught of 4.74 m (15 ft 7 in). The submarine was powered by two Germaniawerft F46 four-stroke, six-cylinder supercharged diesel engines producing a total of 2,800 to 3,200 metric horsepower (2,060 to 2,350 kW; 2,760 to 3,160 shp) for use while surfaced, two AEG GU 460/8–27 double-acting electric motors producing a total of 750 metric horsepower (550 kW; 740 shp) for use while submerged. She had two shafts and two 1.23 m (4 ft) propellers. The boat was capable of operating at depths of up to 230 metres (750 ft).

The submarine had a maximum surface speed of 17.7 knots (32.8 km/h; 20.4 mph) and a maximum submerged speed of 7.6 knots (14.1 km/h; 8.7 mph). When submerged, the boat could operate for 80 nautical miles (150 km; 92 mi) at 4 knots (7.4 km/h; 4.6 mph); when surfaced, she could travel 8,500 nautical miles (15,700 km; 9,800 mi) at 10 knots (19 km/h; 12 mph). U-336 was fitted with five 53.3 cm (21 in) torpedo tubes (four fitted at the bow and one at the stern), fourteen torpedoes, one 8.8 cm (3.46 in) SK C/35 naval gun, 220 rounds, and a 2 cm (0.79 in) C/30 anti-aircraft gun. The boat had a complement of between forty-four and sixty.

== Service history ==
After training with the 5th U-boat Flotilla, she moved to the 1st flotilla for front-line service in December 1942.

The boat carried out five patrols, sinking one ship.

She was a member of ten wolfpacks.

=== First patrol ===
The boat's first patrol was very brief; starting and finishing in Kiel on 12 and 13 November 1942.

=== Second patrol ===
Her second foray also started in Kiel, but terminated in Brest in occupied France after passing between the Faroe and Shetland Islands. She sank the Belgian tanker President Francqui on 29 December 1942 north of the Azores. The ship had already been hit by two torpedoes. U-336 finished her off with a 'coup de grâce'.

=== Third patrol ===
The submarine's third sortie was again into the mid-Atlantic. She spent days scouring the empty wastes, but returned to Brest without success.

=== Fourth patrol ===
U-336's fourth patrol was, at 71 days, her longest. She was attacked by an unidentified aircraft on 10 July 1943 west of Lisbon. Slight damage was the result.

=== Fifth patrol ===
U-336 left Brest for the last time on 14 September 1943. Initially she headed west, out of the Bay of Biscay. On the 24th, she turned north.

== Fate ==
On 5 October, she was sunk by rockets fired by a British Lockheed Hudson of No. 269 Squadron RAF in the Denmark Strait, (between Greenland and Iceland).

Fifty men died; there were no survivors.

=== Wolfpacks ===
U-336 took part in ten wolfpacks, namely:

- Ungestüm (11 – 30 December 1942)
- Neuland (8 – 13 March 1943)
- Dränger (14 – 20 March 1943)
- Seewolf (21 – 30 March 1943)
- Oder (17 – 19 May 1943)
- Mosel (19 – 24 May 1943)
- Trutz (1 – 16 June 1943)
- Trutz 2 (16 – 29 June 1943)
- Geier 3 (30 June – 10 July 1943)
- Rossbach (24 September – 5 October 1943)

== Summary of raiding history ==
Date	Name	Nationality	Tonnage (GRT)	Fate
29 December 1942	President Francqui	Belgium	4,919	Sunk

== Bibliography ==
- Busch, Rainer; Röll, Hans-Joachim (1999). German U-boat commanders of World War II : a biographical dictionary. Translated by Brooks, Geoffrey. London, Annapolis, Md: Greenhill Books, Naval Institute Press. ISBN 1-55750-186-6.
- Busch, Rainer; Röll, Hans-Joachim (1999). Der U-Boot-Krieg, 1939-1945: Deutsche U-Boot-Verluste von September 1939 bis Mai 1945 [German U-boat losses from September 1939 to May 1945] (in German). Vol. IV. Hamburg, Berlin, Bonn: Mittler. ISBN 3-8132-0514-2.
- Gröner, Erich; Jung, Dieter; Maass, Martin (1991). U-boats and Mine Warfare Vessels. German Warships 1815–1945. Vol. 2. Translated by Thomas, Keith; Magowan, Rachel. London: Conway Maritime Press. ISBN 0-85177-593-4.
- Kemp, Paul (1999). U-Boats Destroyed – German Submarine Losses in the World Wars. London: Arms & Armour. ISBN 1-85409-515-3.
