= List of United States Navy losses in World War II =

List of United States Navy and Coast Guard ships lost during World War II, from 31 October 1941 to 31 December 1946, sorted by type and name. This listing also includes constructive losses, which are ships that were damaged beyond economical repair and disposed of. The list does not include United States Merchant Marine ships, many which had United States Navy Armed Guard units.

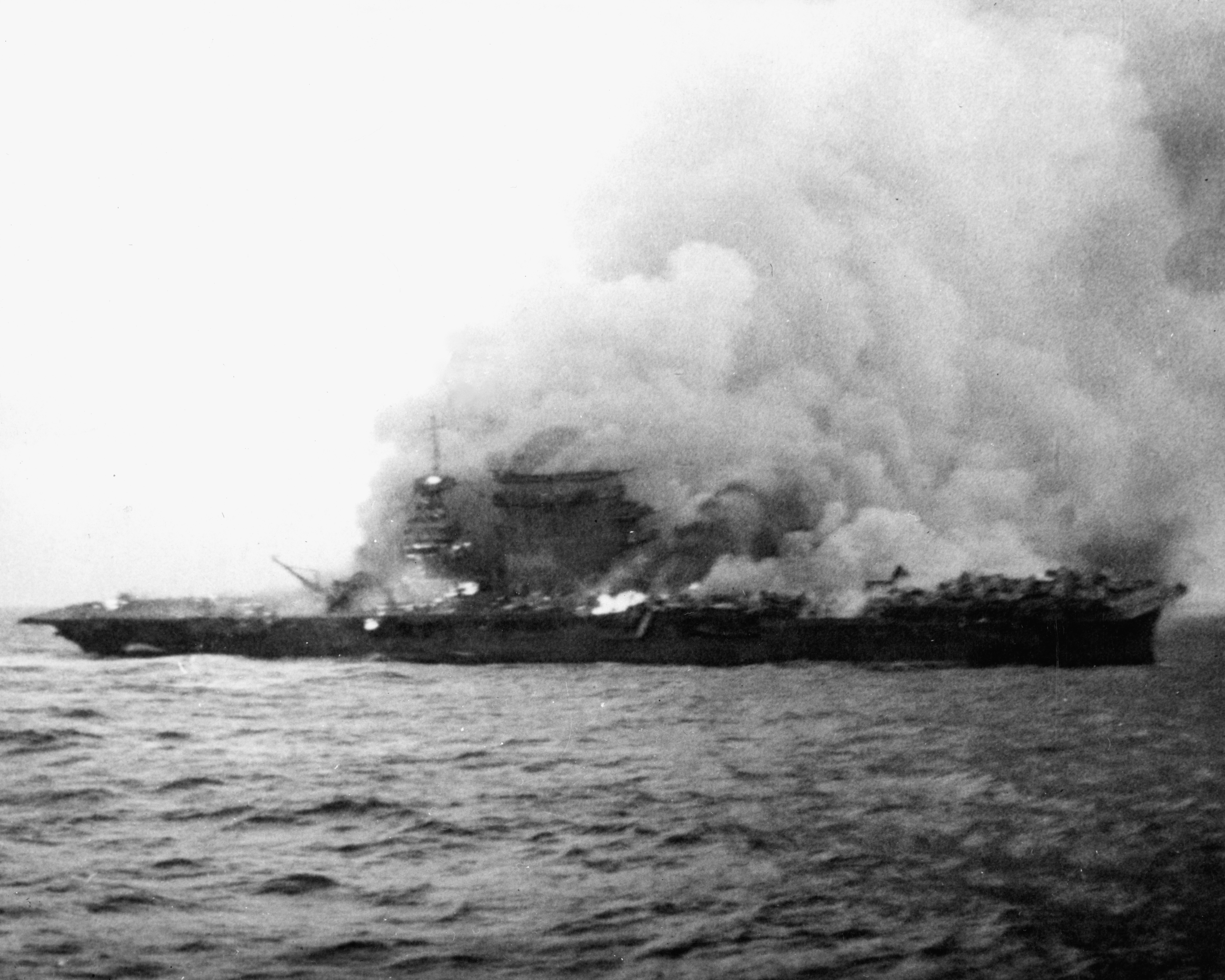
USS Lexington on fire during the Battle of the Coral Sea, 1942

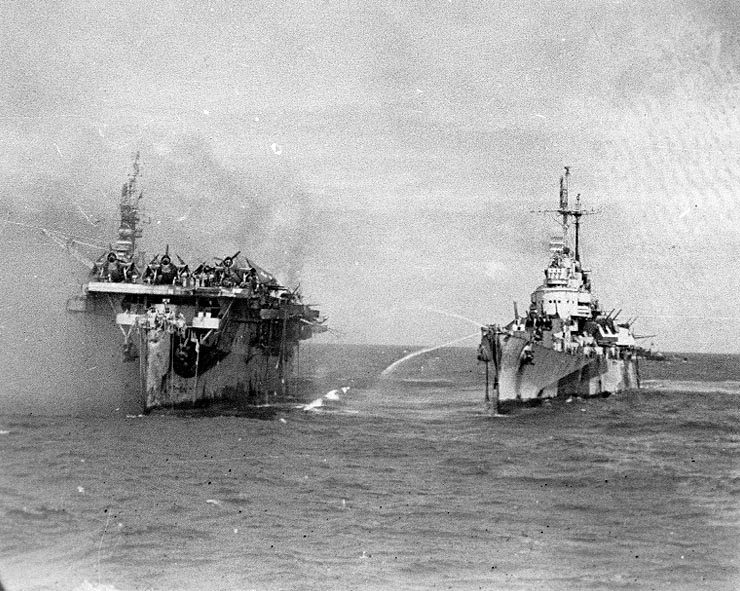
Light cruiser USS Birmingham coming alongside burning aircraft carrier USS Princeton at Battle of Leyte Gulf, 1944

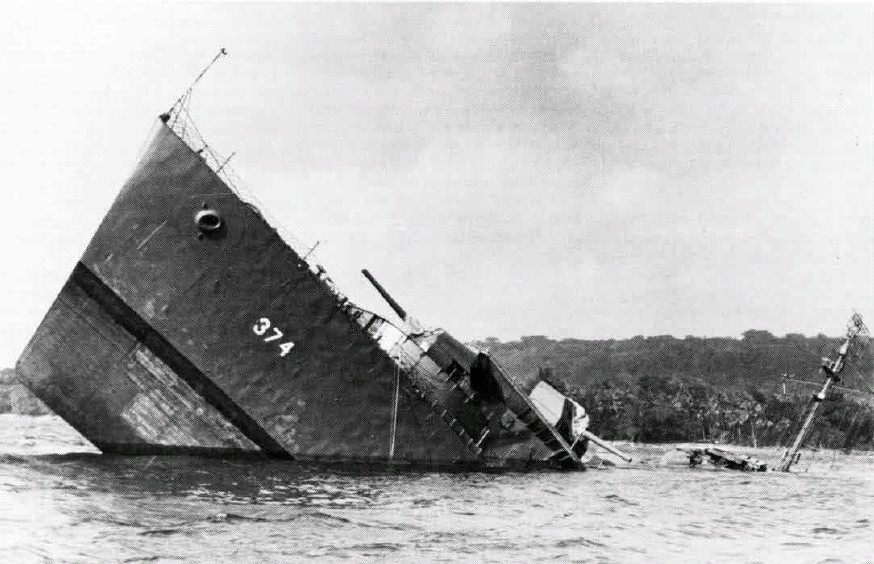
USS Tucker, a Mahan-class destroyer, sinking after striking a mine while escorting a cargo ship into New Hebrides, 1942

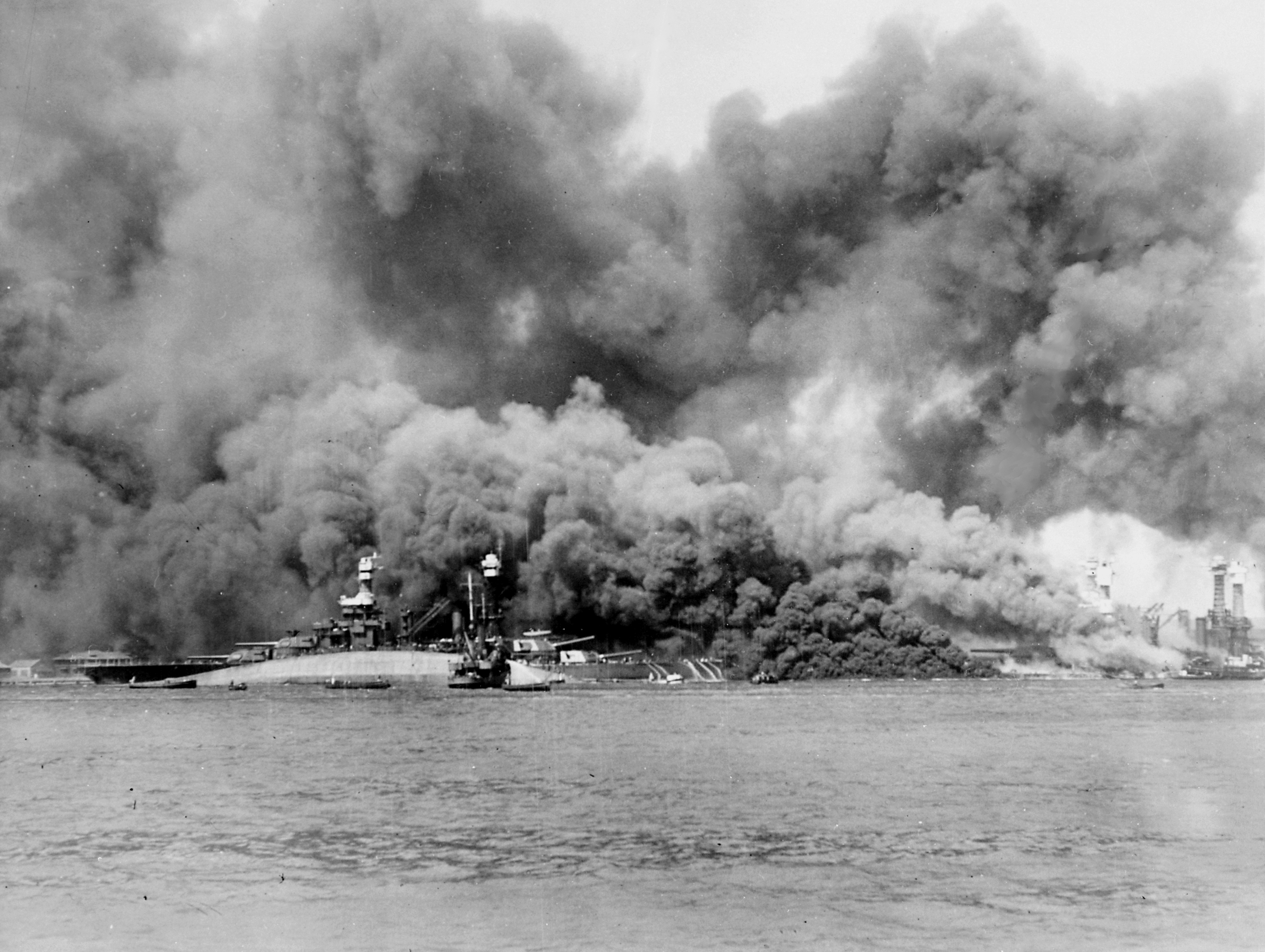
USS Oklahoma, on fire, producing thick smoke, after she took heavy damage during the attack on Pearl Harbor, 1941

Battleships	Number in commission	Number lost	Loss rate	Theatre		
Battleships	Number in commission	Number lost	Loss rate	Pacific	Atlantic	Panama
Old battleships (OBB)	15	2	13.3%	2		
Fast battleships (NBB)	10		0.0%			
Aircraft carriers	Number in commission	Number lost	Loss rate	Theatre		
Aircraft carriers	Number in commission	Number lost	Loss rate	Pacific	Atlantic	Panama
Fleet carriers (CV)	24	4	16.7%	4		
Light carriers (CVL)	9	1	11.1%	1		
Escort carriers (CVE)	77	6	7.8%	5	1	
Cruisers	Number in commission	Number lost	Loss rate	Theatre		
Cruisers	Number in commission	Number lost	Loss rate	Pacific	Atlantic	Panama
Large cruisers (CB)	2		0.0%			
Heavy cruisers (CA)	30	7	23.3%	7		
Light cruisers (CL)	34	1	2.9%	1		
AA light cruisers (CLAA)	8	2	25.0%	2		
Escorts	Number in commission	Number lost	Loss rate	Theatre		
Escorts	Number in commission	Number lost	Loss rate	Pacific	Atlantic	Panama
Old destroyers (DD) *	132	12	9.1%	5	7	
New destroyers (DD)	343	69	20.1%	57	12	
Destroyer escorts (DE)	421	15	3.6%	7	8	
Submarines	Number in commission	Number lost	Loss rate	Theatre		
Submarines	Number in commission	Number lost	Loss rate	Pacific	Atlantic	Panama
Numbered craft (SS) *	62	7	11.3%	5	1	1
Named craft (SS)	256	47	18.4%	45	1	1
* World War I-era designs

== Combatants ==
=== Battleships (BB) ===
Name	Hull number	Ship class	Location	Date	Cause
Arizona	BB-39	Pennsylvania class	21°21′N 157°57′W, Pearl Harbor	7 December 1941	Sunk by bombers from aircraft carrier Hiryū
Oklahoma	BB-37	Nevada class	Pearl Harbor	7 December 1941	Capsized by torpedo bombers from aircraft carriers Akagi and Kaga and raised in 1943 but not repaired. Sank 17 May 1947 in a storm while being towed to San Francisco for scrapping.

Note - USS Utah (AG-16) (ex BB-31) is not listed as a battleship as it had been converted to an anti-aircraft gunnery training ship by the time of her sinking; it is included in the sub-section "Other auxiliaries". During the Attack on Pearl Harbor, USS West Virginia (BB-48) and USS California (BB-44) were sunk while USS Nevada (BB-36) was beached, however, all three ships were refloated, rebuilt and returned to service.

=== Aircraft carriers (CV/CVL) ===
Name	Hull number	Ship class	Location	Date	Cause
Lexington	CV-2	Lexington class	15°12′S 155°27′E, Battle of the Coral Sea	8 May 1942	Sunk by aircraft from carriers Shōkaku and Zuikaku
Yorktown	CV-5	Yorktown class	30°36′N 176°34′W, Battle of Midway	7 June 1942	Crippled by planes from aircraft carrier Hiryū, finished off by torpedoes from the Japanese submarine I-168
Wasp	CV-7	Wasp class (smaller design variant)	12°25′S 164°08′E	15 September 1942	Torpedoed by Japanese submarine I-19
Hornet	CV-8	Yorktown class	08°38′S 166°43′E, Battle of the Santa Cruz Islands	26 October 1942	Crippled by aircraft from Shōkaku and Zuikaku, and after failed scuttling attempt was finished off by destroyers Akigumo and Makigumo
Princeton	CVL-23	Independence class	15°21′N 123°31′E, Battle of Leyte Gulf	24 October 1944	Sunk by land-based aircraft bomb

=== Escort aircraft carriers (CVE) ===
Name	Hull number	Ship class	Location	Date	Cause
Liscome Bay	CVE-56	Casablanca class	02°54′N 172°30′E	24 November 1943	Torpedoed by Japanese submarine I-175
Block Island	CVE-21	Bogue class	31°13′N 23°03′W	29 May 1944	Torpedoed by German submarine U-549
Gambier Bay	CVE-73	Casablanca class	11°31′N 126°12′E, Battle off Samar	25 October 1944	Sunk by gunfire primarily from the Japanese battleship Yamato
St. Lo	CVE-63	Casablanca class	11°13′N 126°05′E, Battle off Samar	25 October 1944	Sunk by Kamikaze aircraft
Ommaney Bay	CVE-79	Casablanca class	11°25′N 121°19′E	4 January 1945	Struck by Kamikaze aircraft and scuttled.
Bismarck Sea	CVE-95	Casablanca class	24°2′21″N 141°18′49″E, Battle of Iwo Jima	21 February 1945	Sunk by Kamikaze aircraft

=== Heavy cruisers (CA) ===
Name	Hull number	Ship class	Location	Date	Cause
Houston	CA-30	Northampton class	05°50′S 105°55′E, Battle of Sunda Strait	1 March 1942	Sunk by gunfire and torpedoes from Japanese heavy cruisers Mogami and Mikuma and destroyer Shikinami
Astoria	CA-34	New Orleans class	Off Savo Island, Solomons, Battle of Savo Island	9 August 1942	Sunk by gunfire from Japanese heavy cruisers Chōkai, Aoba, Kinugasa, and Furutaka,
Quincy	CA-39	New Orleans class	Off Savo Island, Solomons, Battle of Savo Island	9 August 1942	Sunk by naval gunfire and torpedoes from Furutaka and Aoba and light cruiser Tenyū
Vincennes	CA-44	New Orleans class	9°7′17″S 159°52′48″E, Battle of Savo Island	9 August 1942	Sunk by gunfire from the heavy cruisers Kako and Kinugasa and torpedoes from Chōkai and the light cruiser Yūbari
Northampton	CA-26	Northampton class	09°12′S 159°50′E, Battle of Tassafaronga	30 November 1942	Sunk by torpedoes from the Japanese destroyers Kagerō and Makinami
Chicago	CA-29	Northampton class	11°25′S 160°56′E, Battle of Rennell Island	30 January 1943	Sunk by land-based aircraft torpedoes
Indianapolis	CA-35	Portland class	12°02′N 134°48′E, Philippine Sea	30 July 1945	Torpedoed by Japanese submarine I-58

=== Light cruisers (CL) ===
Name	Hull number	Ship class	Location	Date	Cause
Atlanta	CL-51	Atlanta class	Off Lunga Point, Guadalcanal, Naval Battle of Guadalcanal	13 November 1942	Fatally damaged by gunfire from battleship Hiei and a torpedo from destroyer Ikazuchi, scuttled the following day.
Juneau	CL-52	Atlanta class	10°34′S 161°04′E, Naval Battle of Guadalcanal	13 November 1942	Crippled by torpedo from the Japanese destroyer Amatsukaze, later finished off by another torpedo from the Japanese submarine I-26
Helena	CL-50	Brooklyn class	7°46′S 157°11′E, Battle of Kula Gulf	6 July 1943	Sunk by torpedoes from the Japanese destroyers Suzukaze and Tanikaze

=== Destroyers (DD) ===
Name	Hull Number	Ship Class	Location	Date	Cause
Aaron Ward	DD-483	Gleaves class	9°10′S 160°12′E	7 April 1943	Sunk by dive bombers from the Japanese aircraft carrier Junyō.
Abner Read	DD-526	Fletcher class	10°47′N 125°22′E	1 November 1944	Sunk by Kamikaze aircraft.
Barton	DD-599	Benson class	Off Guadalcanal, Solomons, Battle of Guadalcanal	13 November 1942	Torpedoed by Japanese destroyer Amatsukaze.
Beatty	DD-640	Gleaves class	37°10′N 6°00′E	6 November 1943	Sunk by German land-based aircraft torpedo.
Benham	DD-397	Benham class	Off Savo Island, Solomons, Battle of Guadalcanal	15 November 1942	Fatally damaged by torpedo possibly from the Japanese destroyer Shirayuki, later scuttled.
Blue	DD-387	Bagley class	9°17′S 160°02′E	22 August 1942	Torpedoed by Japanese destroyer Kawakaze.
Borie	DD-215	Clemson class	50°12′N 30°48′W	1 November 1943	Sunk after collision with German submarine U-405 which also sank.
Bristol	DD-453	Gleaves class	37°19′N 6°19′E	13 October 1943	Torpedoed by German submarine U-371.
Brownson	DD-518	Fletcher class	5°20′S 148°25′E	26 December 1943	Sunk by land-based aircraft bombs.
Buck	DD-420	Sims class	40°00′N 14°30′E	9 October 1943	Torpedoed by German submarine U-616.
Bush	DD-529	Fletcher class	27°16′N 127°48′E	6 April 1945	Sunk by Kamikaze aircraft.
Callaghan	DD-792	Fletcher class	25°43′N 126°55′E	29 July 1945	Sunk by Kamikaze aircraft.
Chevalier	DD-451	Fletcher class	7°30′S 156°14′E Battle of Vella Lavella	6 October 1943	Fatally damaged by torpedo from Japanese destroyer Yūgumo, later scuttled
Colhoun	DD-801	Fletcher class	27°16′N 127°48′E	6 April 1945	Sunk by Kamikaze aircraft.
Cooper	DD-695	Allen M. Sumner class	10°54′N 124°36′E	3 December 1944	Torpedoed by the Japanese destroyer Take.
Corry	DD-463	Gleaves class	49°31′N 1°11′W	6 June 1944	Sunk by German shore batteries.
Cushing	DD-376	Mahan class	Off Savo Island, Solomons, Battle of Guadalcanal	13 November 1942	Sunk by gunfire from the Japanese light cruiser Nagara and destroyers Yukikaze, Harusame, and Teruzuki.
De Haven	DD-469	Fletcher class	9°09′S 159°52′E	1 February 1943	Sunk by aircraft bombs.
Drexler	DD-741	Allen M. Sumner class	27°6′N 127°38′E	28 May 1945	Sunk by Kamikaze aircraft.
Duncan	DD-485	Gleaves class	Off Savo Island, Solomons, Battle of Cape Esperance	12 October 1942	Sunk by gunfire from the Japanese heavy cruiser Kinugasa and friendly fire.
Edsall	DD-219	Clemson class	13°45′S 106°45′E	1 March 1942	Crippled by dive bombers from the Japanese aircraft carriers Akagi, Sōryū, and Hiryū finished off by the battleships Hiei and Kirishima and heavy cruisers Tone and Chikuma.
Evans	DD-552	Fletcher class	Off Okinawa	11 May 1945	Severely damaged by Kamikaze and not repaired.
Glennon	DD-620	Gleaves class	50°32′N 1°12′W	8 June 1944	Sunk by German shore batteries.
Gwin	DD-433	Gleaves class	7°41′S 157°27′E, Battle of Kolombangara	13 July 1943	Sunk by torpedo spread from the Japanese destroyers Yukikaze, Hamakaze, Kiyonami, and Yūgure
Haggard	DD-555	Fletcher class	Off Okinawa	29 April 1945	Severely damaged by Kamikaze and not repaired.
Halligan	DD-584	Fletcher class	26°10′N 127°30′E	26 March 1945	Sunk by naval mine.
Hammann	DD-412	Sims class	30°36′N 176°34′W	6 June 1942	Torpedoed by Japanese submarine I-168.
Henley	DD-391	Bagley class	7°40′S 148°06′E	3 October 1943	Sunk by torpedo from Japanese submarine Ro-108.
Hoel	DD-533	Fletcher class	11°46′S 126°33′E, Battle off Samar	25 October 1944	Sunk by gunfire from Japanese battleships Yamato and Nagato and heavy cruiser Haguro.
Hugh W. Hadley	DD-774	Allen M. Sumner class	Off Okinawa	11 May 1945	Severely damaged by Kamikaze and not repaired.
Hull	DD-350	Farragut class	14°57′N 127°58′E	18 December 1944	Sunk in typhoon.
Hutchins	DD-476	Fletcher class	Off Okinawa	27 April 1945	Severely damaged by Kamikaze boat and not repaired.
Ingraham	DD-444	Gleaves class	42°34′N 60°05′W	22 August 1942	Sunk in collision with the oil tanker USS Chemung (AO-30)
Jacob Jones	DD-130	Wickes class	38°42′N 74°39′W	28 February 1942	Torpedoed by German submarine U-578.
Jarvis	DD-393	Bagley class	9°42′S 158°59′E	9 August 1942	Sunk by land based Japanese torpedo bombers.
Johnston	DD-557	Fletcher class	11°46′N 126°09′E, Battle off Samar	25 October 1944	Sunk by gunfire from Japanese battleship Yamato, the light cruiser Yahagi, and destroyers Yukikaze, Isokaze, Urakaze, and Nowaki
Laffey	DD-459	Benson class	Off Savo Island, Solomons, Battle of Guadalcanal	13 November 1942	Torpedoed and sunk by Japanese destroyer Yukikaze
Lansdale	DD-426	Benson class	37°03′N 3°51′E	20 April 1944	Sunk by German land-based aircraft torpedoes.
Leary	DD-158	Wickes class	45°N 22°W	24 December 1943	Torpedoed by German submarine U-275.
Leutze	DD-481	Fletcher class	Off Okinawa	6 April 1945	Severely damaged by Kamikaze and not repaired.
Little	DD-803	Fletcher class	26°24′N 126°15′E	3 May 1945	Sunk by Kamikaze aircraft.
Longshaw	DD-559	Fletcher class	26°11′N 127°37′E	18 May 1945	Sunk by shore batteries after accidental grounding.
Luce	DD-522	Fletcher class	26°35′N 127°10′E	4 May 1945	Sunk by Kamikaze aircraft.
Maddox	DD-622	Gleaves class	36°52′N 13°56′E	10 July 1943	Sunk by German land-based aircraft bombs.
Mahan	DD-364	Mahan class	10°50′N 124°30′E	7 December 1944	Sunk by Kamikaze aircraft.
Mannert L. Abele	DD-733	Allen M. Sumner class	27°25′N 126°59′E	12 April 1945	Sunk by rocket-powered Ohka aircraft bomb .
Meredith	DD-434	Gleaves class	11°53′S 163°20′E	15 October 1942	Sunk by aircraft from Japanese aircraft carrier Zuikaku.
Meredith	DD-726	Allen M. Sumner class	49°33′N 1°06′W	8 June 1944	Sunk by naval mine.
Monaghan	DD-354	Farragut class	14°57′N 127°58′E	18 December 1944	Sunk in typhoon.
Monssen	DD-436	Gleaves class	9°04′S 159°54′E, Battle of Guadalcanal	13 November 1942	Sunk by gunfire from Japanese battleship Hiei and destroyers Asagumo, Murasame, and Samidare.
Morris	DD-417	Sims class	Off Okinawa	6 April 1945	Severely damaged by Kamikaze and not repaired.
Morrison	DD-560	Fletcher class	27°10′N 127°58′E	4 May 1945	Sunk by Kamikaze aircraft.
Newcomb	DD-586	Fletcher class	Off Okinawa	6 April 1945	Severely damaged by Kamikaze and not repaired.
O'Brien	DD-415	Sims class	13°30′S 171°18′W	19 October 1942	Torpedoed by Japanese submarine I-19
Parrott	DD-218	Clemson class	Boston, Massachusetts	2 May 1944	Irreparably damaged after being rammed by SS John Morton, later towed to Norfolk, Virginia and scrapped.
Peary	DD-226	Clemson class	12°28′30″S 130°49′45″E, Bombing of Darwin	19 February 1942	Sunk by carrier based aircraft bombs in Darwin Harbour
Perkins	DD-377	Mahan class	Off New Guinea	29 November 1943	Sunk after being rammed by Australian troopship Duntroon.
Pillsbury	DD-227	Clemson class	14°30′S 106°30′E	2 March 1942	Sunk by gunfire from Japanese heavy cruisers Takao and Atago.
Pope	DD-225	Clemson class	04°00′S 111°30′E	1 March 1942	Sunk by carrier based aircraft bombs.
Porter	DD-356	Porter class	8°32′S 167°17′E	26 October 1942	Fate uncertain: Torpedoed by crashing TBF Avenger, downed by fighters from the light carrier Zuihō
Preston	DD-379	Mahan class	Off Savo Island, Solomons, Battle of Guadalcanal	15 November 1942	Sunk by gunfire from the light cruiser Nagara and torpedo from the destroyer Ayanami
Pringle	DD-477	Fletcher class	27°25′N 126°59′E	16 April 1945	Sunk by Kamikaze aircraft.
Reid	DD-369	Mahan class	9°50′N 124°55′E	11 December 1944	Sunk by Kamikaze aircraft.
Reuben James	DD-245	Clemson class	51°59′N 27°05′W	31 October 1941	Torpedoed by German submarine U-552.
Rowan	DD-405	Benham class	40°07′N 14°18′E	11 September 1943	Torpedoed by a German E-boat.
Shaw	DD-373	Mahan class	Leyte, Philippines	2 April 1945	Grounded and not repaired.
Shubrick	DD-639	Gleaves class	Off Okinawa	29 May 1945	Severely damaged by Kamikaze and not repaired.
Sims	DD-409	Sims class	Coral Sea	7 May 1942	Sunk by carrier-based aircraft bombs.
Spence	DD-512	Fletcher class	14°57′N 127°58′E	18 December 1944	Sunk in typhoon.
Stewart	DD-224	Clemson class	Off Surabaya, Java	19 February 1942	Scuttled on account of damage inflicted by the Japanese destroyers Asashio and Ōshio during the battle of the Badung Strait, 19 February 1942. Later salvaged by Japanese as Patrol Boat No. 102 (Sunk in 1946 as target ship).
Strong	DD-467	Fletcher class	Kula Gulf, Solomons	5 July 1943	Torpedoed and sunk by Japanese destroyer Niizuki
Sturtevant	DD-240	Clemson class	Off Key West, Florida	26 April 1942	Sunk in American-laid minefield.
Thatcher	DD-514	Fletcher class	Off Okinawa	19 July 1945	Severely damaged by Kamikaze and not repaired.
Truxtun	DD-229	Clemson class	Placentia Bay, Newfoundland	18 February 1942	Sunk after accidental grounding in a storm.
Tucker	DD-374	Mahan class	Off Espiritu Santo Island, New Hebrides	4 August 1942	Sunk by naval mine.
Turner	DD-648	Gleaves class	Off Ambrose Light, New York	3 January 1944	Sunk by internal explosions.
Twiggs	DD-591	Fletcher class	26°08′N 127°35′E	16 June 1945	Sunk by aerial torpedo and Kamikaze aircraft.
Walke	DD-416	Sims class	Off Savo Island, Solomons, Battle of Guadalcanal	15 November 1942	Torpedoed and sunk by Japanese destroyer Samidare
Warrington	DD-383	Somers class	27°N 73°W	13 September 1944	Sank in a hurricane.
William D. Porter	DD-579	Fletcher class	27°06′N 127°38′E	10 June 1945	Sunk by Kamikaze aircraft
Worden	DD-352	Farragut class	Amchitka Island, Aleutians	12 January 1943	Sunk after accidental grounding.

=== Destroyer escorts (DE) ===
Name	Hull Number	Ship Class	Location	Date	Cause
Donnell	DE-56	Buckley class	North Atlantic Ocean	3 May 1944	Torpedoed by U-473 and damaged beyond repair. Re-designated IX-182 15 July 1944 and converted to a floating power plant at Cherbourg, France in August 1944. Later used as a barracks ship.
England	DE-635	Buckley class	Off Okinawa	9 May 1945	Severely damaged by Kamikaze and not repaired.
Eversole	DE-404	John C. Butler class	10°10′N 127°28′E	28 October 1944	Presumed torpedoed by Japanese submarine I-45.
Fechteler	DE-157	Buckley class	36°07′N 02°40′W	5 May 1944	Torpedoed by German submarine U-967.
Fiske	DE-143	Edsall class	47°11′N 33°29′W	2 August 1944	Torpedoed by German submarine U-802.
Frederick C. Davis	DE-136	Edsall class	43°52′N 40°15′W	24 April 1945	Sunk by German submarine U-546.
Holder	DE-401	Edsall class	Mediterranean Sea	11 April 1944	Irreparably damaged by German aircraft torpedo.
Leopold	DE-319	Edsall class	58°44′N 25°50′W	10 March 1944	Torpedoed by German submarine U-255. Crewed by Coast Guard.
Oberrender	DE-344	John C. Butler class	Off Okinawa, Ryukyus	9 May 1945	Irreparably damaged by Kamikaze aircraft.
Rich	DE-695	Buckley class	49°31′N 1°10′W Utah Beach	8 June 1944	Sunk by German mines.
Roche	DE-197	Cannon class	Off Eniwetok	22 September 1945	Irreparably damaged by naval mine.
Samuel B. Roberts	DE-413	John C. Butler class	Off Samar Island, Battle off Samar	25 October 1944	Sunk by gunfire from Japanese battleship Kongō
Shelton	DE-407	John C. Butler class	2°32′N 129°13′E	3 October 1944	Torpedoed by Japanese Kaichū type submarine Ro-41.
Solar	DE-221	Buckley class	Naval Ammo Depot, Earle, New Jersey	30 April 1946	Accidental explosion. Damaged beyond repair and scuttled on 9 June 1946.
Underhill	DE-682	Buckley class	19°20′N 126°42′E	24 July 1945	Sunk by kaiten suicide torpedo from Japanese submarine I-53

=== Submarines (SS) ===
Name	Hull Number	Ship Class	Location	Date	Cause
Albacore	SS-218	Gato class	Japanese home waters	7 November 1944	Presumed sunk by naval mine off northeastern Hokkaidō.
Amberjack	SS-219	Gato class	Off New Britain	16 February 1943	Sunk by Japanese torpedo boat Hiyodori and submarine chaser No. 18.
Argonaut	SM-1		Off New Britain	10 January 1943	Sunk by Japanese destroyers Isokaze and Maikaze.
Barbel	SS-316	Balao class	Off Borneo	4 February 1945	Sunk by Japanese aircraft.
Bonefish	SS-223	Gato class	Sea of Japan	19 June 1945	Sunk by Japanese depth charge attack by kaibokan Okinawa, CD-63, CD-75, CD-158, and CD-207.
Bullhead	SS-332	Balao class	Java Sea	6 August 1945	Sunk by Japanese aircraft; last US submarine loss of the war.
Capelin	SS-289	Balao class	Celebes Sea	Lost after 2 December 1943	Fate unknown: Possibly sunk by naval mine or Japanese minelayer Wakataka.
Cisco	SS-290	Balao class	off Mindanao	28 September 1943	Sunk by Japanese aircraft and gunboat Karatsu (ex-USS Luzon).
Corvina	SS-226	Gato class	off Truk	16 November 1943	Torpedoed by Japanese submarine I-176.
Darter	SS-227	Gato class	Palawan Passage, Philippines	24 October 1944	Accidentally grounded and scuttled after sinking Japanese cruiser Atago and chasing Japanese cruiser Takao.
Dorado	SS-248	Gato class	near the Panama Canal Zone	15 October 1943	Possibly sunk by friendly fire air attack (PBM Mariner of Patrol Squadron 210) or possibly mines laid by U-214.
Escolar	SS-294	Balao class	Yellow Sea	Lost about 17 October 1944	Probably sunk by naval mine.
Flier	SS-250	Gato class	Balabac Strait, Philippines	12 August 1944	Sunk by naval mine.
Golet	SS-361	Gato class	Japanese home waters	14 June 1944	Sunk by Japanese patrol vessel Miya Maru and auxiliary subchaser Bunzan Maru.
Grampus	SS-207	Tambor class	Off New Britain	5 March 1943	Sunk by depth charges from Japanese destroyers Minegumo and Murasame or by 958th Kōkūtai naval aircraft.
Grayback	SS-208	Tambor class	Ryukyu Islands	27 February 1944	Sunk by Japanese aircraft.
Grayling	SS-209	Tambor class	Lingayen Gulf, Philippines	Between 9 September and 12 September 1943	Fate unknown: possibly rammed by transport Hokuan Maru.
Grenadier	SS-210	Tambor class	Strait of Malacca	22 April 1943	Scuttled after attack by Japanese aircraft.
Growler	SS-215	Gato class	Philippine waters	8 November 1944	Sunk by Japanese destroyer Shigure, and kaibokan Chiburi and "CD-19".
Grunion	SS-216	Gato class	Aleutian waters-10 miles north of Kiska Island	31 July 1942	Sunk by accident following circular run of her own torpedo.
Gudgeon	SS-211	Tambor class	Maug Islands or possibly Iwo Jima	18 April 1944	Fate unknown: possibly sunk by Japanese aircraft.
Halibut	SS-232	Gato class	Bashi Channel, Philippines	14 November 1944	Severely damaged by Japanese aircraft and not repaired to operational condition. Decommissioned on 18 July 1945.
Harder	SS-257	Gato class	Dasol Bay, Philippines	24 August 1944	Depth charged by kaibokan CD-22.
Herring	SS-233	Gato class	Kurile Islands	1 June 1944	Sunk by Japanese shore defense batteries.
Kete	SS-369	Balao class	Ryukyu Islands	Lost about 20 March 1945	Fate unknown: lost either to Japanese submarine or to mines.
Lagarto	SS-371	Balao class	Gulf of Thailand	3 May 1945	Sunk by Japanese minelayer Hatsutaka.
Lancetfish	SS-296	Balao class	Boston Navy Yard	15 March 1945	Sank at her mooring due to flooding and was refloated but not repaired. Decommissioned on 24 March 1945 after only 40 days in commission.
Perch	SS-176	Porpoise class	Java Sea	1-3 March 1942	Sunk by Japanese destroyers Amatsukaze, Hatsukaze, Ushio, and Sazanami
Pickerel	SS-177	Porpoise class	off northern Honshu	Lost on or after 3 April 1943	Cause unknown; possibly sunk by minelayer Shirakami and auxiliary subchaser Bunzan Maru.
Pompano	SS-181	Porpoise class	off northern Honshu	Lost after 25 September 1943	Fate unknown: possibly sunk by naval mine.
R-12	SS-89	R class	Off Key West, Florida	12 June 1943	Sunk by accidental flooding.
Robalo	SS-273	Gato class	West of Palawan Island	26 July 1944	Probably sunk by naval mine.
Runner	SS-275	Gato class	off Hokkaidō	Lost after 26 June 1943	Fate unknown: possibly lost to a mine.
S-26	SS-131	S class	Gulf of Panama	24 January 1942	Accidentally rammed by submarine chaser USS Sturdy.
S-27	SS-132	S class	Amchitka Island, Alaska	19 June 1942	Accidental grounding.
S-28	SS-133	S class	off Oahu, Hawaii	4 July 1944	Foundered while diving in an ASW exercise; cause unknown.
S-36	SS-141	S class	Makassar Strait	20 January 1942	Accidental grounding.
S-39	SS-144	S class	Off Rossel Island	14 August 1942	Accidental grounding.
S-44	SS-155	S class	Kurile Islands	7 October 1943	Sunk by gunfire from Japanese escort ship Ishigaki.
Scamp	SS-277	Gato class	Tokyo Bay	11 November 1944	Probably sunk by kaibokan CD-4 with naval aircraft.
Scorpion	SS-278	Gato class	East China Sea	Lost after 5 January 1944	Fate unknown: probably sunk by naval mine.
Sculpin	SS-191	Sargo class	Gilbert Islands	19 November 1943	Scuttled after being damaged by Japanese destroyer Yamagumo.
Sealion	SS-195	Sargo class	Cavite Navy Yard, Philippines	10 December 1941	Scuttled 25 December 1941 following irreparable damage in air attack 10 December.
Seawolf	SS-197	Sargo class	Off Morotai Island	4 October 1944	Probably sunk by friendly fire from USS Richard M. Rowell (DE-403).
Shark	SS-174	Porpoise class	Molucca Sea	11 February 1942	Sunk by gunfire from Japanese destroyer Yamakaze.
Shark	SS-314	Balao class	Luzon Strait	24 October 1944	Depth charged by Japanese destroyer Harukaze.
Snook	SS-279	Gato class	Off Hainan Island, South China Sea	Lost after 8 April 1945	Possibly sunk by kaibokan Okinawa, CD-8, CD-32, and CD-52 with a 951st Kōkūtai E13A1 Jake and Q1W1 Lorna.
Swordfish	SS-193	Sargo class	Ryukyu Islands	Lost about 12 January 1945	Fate unknown: possibly lost to mines or sunk by kaibokan CD-4.
Tang	SS-306	Balao class	Formosa Strait	25 October 1944	Sunk by circular run of own torpedo.
Trigger	SS-237	Gato class	Ryukyu Islands	28 March 1945	Sunk by kaibokan Mikura, CD-33, and CD-59; assisted by air attack.
Triton	SS-201	Tambor class	Admiralty Islands	15 March 1943	Fate unknown: believed sunk by Japanese destroyers Samidare and Satsuki and submarine chasers CH-22 and CH-24
Trout	SS-202	Tambor class	off Okinawa	29 February 1944	Depth charged and sunk by Japanese destroyer Asashimo southeast of Okinawa in position 22º40'N, 131º45'E.
Tullibee	SS-284	Gato class	off Palau Islands	26 March 1944	Sunk by circular run of own torpedo.
Wahoo	SS-238	Gato class	Japanese Home Waters - La Perouse Strait	11 October 1943	Believed sunk by subchasers CH-15, CH-43 and 3 E13A1 Jakes. Wreck shows evidence of being hit by an aerial bomb.

== Patrol craft ==
=== Gunboats (PG/PGM/PE) ===
Name	Location	Date	Cause
Asheville	South of Java, N.E.I.	3 March 1942	Sunk by gunfire by Japanese destroyers Arashi and Nowaki.
Eagle 56	Off Portland, Maine	23 April 1945	Torpedoed by U-853.
Erie	12°03′N 68°58′W	12 November 1942	Damaged by U-163 in the Caribbean Sea; later capsized.
PGM-7	Bismarck Sea	18 July 1944	Severely damaged in an accidental collision with PGM-4. Towed to repair base on Florida Island, where declared beyond economical repair.
PGM-17	Off Okinawa	4 May 1945	Accidentally grounded. Sunk by US warships in October 1945.
PGM-18	26°13′N 127°54′E	8 April 1945	Sunk by mines off Okinawa.
Plymouth	36°17′N 74°29′W	5 August 1943	Torpedoed by U-566 off the coast of North Carolina.
St. Augustine	38°00′N 74°05′W	6 January 1944	Sunk after accidental collision with merchant tanker Camas Meadows.

=== River gunboats (PR) ===
Name	Location	Date	Cause
Luzon	At Corregidor, P.I.	5 May 1942	Scuttled then salvaged by IJN. Raised as Karatsu and helped sink USS Cisco. Sunk by USS Narwhal on 3 March 1944.
Mindanao	Off Corregidor, P.I.	2 May 1942	Damaged by aerial bomb then scuttled.
Oahu	At Corregidor, P.I.	5 May 1942	Sunk by land-based gunfire.
Wake	At Shanghai China	8 December 1941	Surrendered to Japanese forces and pressed into IJN service as Tatara; recaptured by US; entered Chinese service after the war.

=== Converted yachts (PY/PYc) ===
Name	Location	Date	Cause
Cythera (PY-26)	Off the Coast of North Carolina	2 May 1942	Sunk by U-402.
Moonstone (PYc-9)	Off Delaware Capes	16 October 1943	Collision with USS Greer (DD-145).
Southern Seas (PY-32)	Off Okinawa	9 October 1945	Sunk by Typhoon Louise after five collisions.
Fisheries II	At Corregidor, P.I.	5 May 1942	Scuttled to prevent capture.
Maryann	At Corregidor, P.I.	5 May 1942	Scuttled to prevent capture.
Perry	At Corregidor, P.I.	5 May 1942	Scuttled to prevent capture.

=== Submarine chasers (PC/SC) ===
Name	Location	Date	Cause
PC-457	Off Puerto Rico	14 Aug 1941	Collision with a freighter.
PC-496	37°23′N 9°52′W Off the coast of Portugal.	4 June 1943	Sunk by a mine or by a torpedo from Italian submarine.
PC-558	38°41′N 13°43′E	9 May 1944	Sunk by German submarine U-230.
PC-590	Off Okinawa, Ryukyu Islands	9 October 1945	Grounded, broke in half and sank by Typhoon Louise. Coast Guard crew.
PC-815	Off San Diego, California	11 September 1945	Sunk by collision with USS Laffey (DD-724).
PC-1129	Off Luzon, P.I.	31 January 1945	Sunk by Japanese suicide boat.
PC-1261	Off Utah Beach, Normandy, France	6 June 1944	Sunk by German coast artillery.
PC-1603	26°25′N 127°56′E	26 May 1945	Damaged by kamikaze and later scuttled.
SC-521	11°03′S 164°50′E	10 July 1945	Foundered.
SC-632	Off Okinawa, Ryukyu Islands	6 September 1945	Foundered in Typhoon Ida (1945).
SC-636	Off Okinawa, Ryukyu Islands	9 October 1945	Foundered by Typhoon Louise.
SC-694	Off Palermo, Sicily	23 August 1943	Sunk by German bombers.
SC-696	Off Palermo, Sicily	23 August 1943	Bombed and sunk by German aircraft.
SC-700	Vella Lavella, Solomons	10 March 1944	Sunk by accidental fire.
SC-709	Cape Breton, Nova Scotia	21 January 1943	Grounded.
SC-740	15°32′S 147°06′E	17 June 1943	Grounded on Great Barrier Reef.
SC-744	Tacloban Bay, P.I.	27 November 1944	Sunk by Kamikaze.
SC-751	21°56′S 113°53′E	22 June 1943	Grounded and sunk.
SC-984	Cook's Reef, Mai Island, New Hebrides	9 April 1944	Grounded, abandoned and sunk.
SC-1019	22°28′N 84°30′W	22 April 1945	Grounded and sunk. Salvaged and repaired. Decommissioned on 31 May 1945.
SC-1024	35°12′N 74°57′W	2 March 1943	Collided with USS Plymouth (PG-57) and SS Cities Service Fuel and sank with all hands.
SC-1059	In Bahama Islands	11 December 1944	Grounded. Later salvaged and repaired.
SC-1067	Off Attu, Aleutians	19 November 1943	Foundered.

Eight submarine chasers were lost due to enemy action. All others were lost in accidents.

=== Patrol torpedo boats (PT) ===
Name	Location	Date	Cause
PT-22	North Pacific	11 June 1943	Damaged in storm
PT-28	Dora Harbor, Alaska	12 January 1943	Wrecked in storm
PT-31	Subic Bay, Philippine Islands	20 January 1942	Destroyed to prevent capture
PT-32	Sulu Sea	13 March 1942	Destroyed to prevent capture
PT-33	Off Cape Santiago, Philippine Islands	15 December 1941	Damaged by grounding and destroyed to prevent capture.
PT-34	Off Cauit Island, Philippine Islands	9 April 1942	Sunk by Japanese aircraft
PT-35	Cebu, Philippine Islands	12 April 1942	Destroyed to prevent capture
PT-37	Off Guadalcanal, Solomons	1 February 1943	Sunk by Japanese destroyer Kawakaze
PT-41	Lake Lanao, Mindanao, Philippine Islands	15 April 1942	Destroyed to prevent capture.
PT-43	Off Guadalcanal, Solomons	10 January 1943	Sunk by Japanese destroyers Hatsukaze and Tokitsukaze
PT-44	09º10'S, 159º45'E Off Savo Island, Solomons	11 December 1942	Sunk by Japanese destroyers Kawakaze and Suzukaze
PT-63	Off New Ireland	18 June 1944	Destroyed by fire in port fire while fueling.
PT-67	Off Tufi, New Guinea	17 March 1943	Destroyed by fire in port fire while fueling.
PT-68	New Guinea	1 October 1943	Grounded, destroyed to prevent capture.
PT-73	Philippines	15 January 1945	Grounded, destroyed to prevent capture.
PT-77	Off Tallinn Pt., Luzon, P.I.	1 February 1945	Destroyed by friendly fire due to false identification.
PT-79	Off Tallinn Pt., Luzon, P.I.	1 February 1945	Destroyed by friendly fire due to false identification.
PT-107	Hamburg Bay, Emirau Island	18 June 1944	Accidental gasoline fire.
PT-109	Blackett Strait, Solomons	2 August 1943	Rammed and sunk by Japanese destroyer Amagiri.
PT-110	Off New Guinea	26 January 1944	Sunk after collision.
PT-111	Off Guadalcanal I., Solomons	1 February 1943	Sunk by Japanese destroyer Kawakaze.
PT-112	Off Guadalcanal I., Solomons	10 January 1943	Sunk by Japanese destroyers Hatsukaze and Tokitsukaze
PT-113	Off Buna, New Guinea	8 August 1943	Wrecked by grounding in friendly waters.
PT-117	Rendova Harbor, Solomons	1 August 1943	Destroyed by Japanese aircraft.
PT-118	Vella Lavella, Solomons	7 September 1943	Grounded and destroyed to prevent capture.
PT-119	Off Tufi, New Guinea	17 March 1943	Accidentally destroyed by fire while fueling in port.
PT-121	5°S 151°E	27 March 1944	Destroyed in error by friendly fire from Allied aircraft
PT-123	Off Guadalcanal, Solomon Islands	1 February 1943	Destroyed by Japanese aircraft.
PT-133	Off Cape Pus, New Guinea	15 July 1944	Sunk by Japanese shore battery.
PT-135	5°29′S 152°09′E	12 April 1944	Grounded, destroyed to prevent capture.
PT-136	Vitiaz Strait, New Guinea	17 September 1943	Grounded, destroyed to prevent capture.
PT-145	New Guinea	4 January 1944	Grounded, destroyed to prevent capture.
PT-147	New Guinea	19 November 1943	Grounded, destroyed to prevent capture.
PT-153	Solomon Islands	4 July 1943	Grounded, destroyed to prevent capture.
PT-158	Off Munda Pt., Solomon Islands	5 July 1943	Grounded, destroyed to prevent capture.
PT-164	Ferguson Passage, Solomon Islands	1 August 1943	Sunk by Japanese aircraft.
PT-165	23°45′S 166°30′E	23 May 1943	Sunk on board SS Stanvac Manila when that ship was torpedoed and sunk by Japanese submarine I-17.
PT-166	Off New Georgia, Solomon Islands	20 July 1943	Accidentally strafed and sunk by US B-25 bomber.
PT-172	Off Vella Lavella, Solomons	7 September 1943	Grounded and destroyed to prevent capture.
PT-173	23°45′S 166°30′E	23 May 1943	Sunk on board SS Stanvac Manila when that ship was torpedoed and sunk by the Japanese submarine I-17.
PT-193	Bani Point, New Guinea 0°55′S 134°52′E	25 June 1944	Grounded on a coral reef and destroyed to prevent capture.
PT-200	Off Newport, Rhode Island 41°N 71°W	23 February 1944	Collision with unknown object.
PT-202	43°23′N 6°43′E	16 August 1944	Sunk by German mine off Point Aygulf, France.
PT-218	43°23′N 6°43′E	16 August 1944	Sunk by German mine off Point Aygulf, France.
PT-219	Off Attu, Aleutians	14 September 1943	Grounded in a storm.
PT-239	Lambu Lambu Cove, Vella Lavella, Solomons	14 December 1943	Destroyed after fire broke out in a gasoline dump.
PT-247	6°38′S 156°01′E	5 May 1944	Sunk by Japanese shore battery, off Bougainville, Solomon Islands.
PT-251	Empress Augusta Bay, off Bougainville, Solomons	26 February 1944	Grounded on 26 February 1944 and sunk by Japanese shore batteries.
PT-279	Off Bougainville I., Solomon Islands	11 February 1944	Sunk in a collision with PT-282.
PT-283	Off Choiseul Island, near Bougainville, Solomon Islands	17 March 1944	Mistakenly sunk by gunfire from USS Guest (DD-472).
PT-300	Off Mindoro, Philippines	18 December 1944	Sunk by a Japanese kamikaze aircraft.
PT-301	Mios Woendi, Biak Island, off New Guinea	7 November 1944	Heavily damaged by an accidental explosion. Laid up as a constructive loss.
PT-311	43°N 9°E	18 November 1944	Sunk by mine off Corsica.
PT-320	San Pedro Bay, off Leyte, Philippines	1 November 1944	Bombed and sunk by Japanese aircraft.
PT-321	San Isidoro Bay, P.I.	11 November 1944	Grounded and damaged on 10 November 1944 and destroyed to prevent capture.
PT-322	Near Hardenberg Point, New Guinea	24 November 1944	Grounded and damaged and then scuttled to prevent capture.
PT-323	10°33′N 125°14′E Leyte, Philippines	10 December 1944	Destroyed by a Japanese Kamikaze.
PT-337	Hansa Bay, New Guinea	7 March 1944	Destroyed by Japanese shore batteries.
PT-338	12°06′N 121°23′E Mindoro, Philippines	28 January 1945	Severely damaged by grounding and scrapped.
PT-339	Off Biak, New Guinea	27 May 1944	Grounded and destroyed to prevent capture.
PT-346	Off New Britain	29 April 1944	Attacked and destroyed by mistake by US Marine Corps aircraft.
PT-347	Off New Britain	29 April 1944	Attacked and destroyed by mistake by US Marine Corps aircraft.
PT-353	5°S 151°E	27 March 1944	Accidentally sunk by allied aircraft.
PT-363	Kaoe Bay, Halmahera, N.E.I.	25 November 1944	Sunk by Japanese shore batteries.
PT-368	Off Halmahera, N.E.I.	11 October 1944	Grounded and destroyed to prevent capture.
PT-371	2°05′N 127°51′E	19 September 1944	Grounded and destroyed to prevent capture.
PT-493	In Surigao Strait, P.I.	25 October 1944	Sunk by gunfire from Japanese battleship Yamashiro
PT-509	49°11′N 2°15′W	9 August 1944	Gunfire and ramming from a German minesweeper
PT-555	Off Cape Couronne, Mediterranean	23 August 1944	Sunk by enemy mine.

24 PT boats were destroyed by enemy action. 20 PT boats were destroyed by grounding, another 9 were sunk by friendly fire and 10 more were lost due to other accidents. 4 PT boats were destroyed to prevent capture (aside from those which were grounded and then destroyed to prevent capture).

=== District patrol vessels (YP) ===
Name	Location	Date	Cause
YP-16	Guam	9 December 1941	Damaged by Japanese forces and later burned by crew.
YP-17	Guam	9 December 1941	Scuttled and raised by the Japanese CG-275/YP-17 was transferred to the Maritime Administration in 1945, presumably for disposal or layup in the Reserve Fleet
YP-26	In Canal Zone	19 November 1942	Destroyed by explosion of unknown cause while hauled out on a marine railway.
YP-47	Off Staten Island, New York	26 April 1943	Sunk in collision with the minesweeper YMS-110 in the Ambrose Channel.
YP-72	Adak Island, Aleutians	17 February 1943	Struck uncharted reef in Kuluk Bay.
YP-73	In Kodiak Harbor, Alaska	15 January 1945	Struck reef and grounded near Spruce Cape signal station.
YP-74	54°23′N 164°10′W Aleutian Islands	6 September 1942	Collision with freighter SS Derblay off Unimak Island.
YP-77	Off Reedy Island, Delaware	28 April 1942	Sunk by collision. (Former PC-523.)
YP-88	At Amchitka, Aleutians	28 October 1943	Grounded.
YP-94	56°32′N 154°22′W Tugidak Passage, Alaska	18 February 1945	Grounded.
YP-95	Adak Island, Aleutians	1 May 1944	Grounded.
YP-97	Philippines	March 1942	Destroyed to prevent capture.
YP-128	Three miles northeast of Monterey, California	30 June 1942	Sunk after running aground in heavy weather.
YP-183	Mahaiula Bay, Kona, Hawaii	12 January 1943	Sunk after running aground during a storm. (Originally the 71 foot long Aku Sampan Fuji Maru.)
YP-205	Saba Island, Caribbean Sea; 18°30′N 65°00′W	1 November 1942	Lost after grounding.
YP-235	In Gulf of Mexico	1 April 1943	Sunk by explosion of unknown cause.
YP-270	Baja, Mexico north of Isla Magdalena; 25°30′N 112°06′W	30 June 1942	Sunk after running aground in heavy weather.
YP-277	Off French Frigate Shoals, Northern Pacific Ocean	23 May 1942	Destroyed by fire after striking a U.S. mine.
YP-279	Off Townsville, Australia	5 September 1943	Foundered.
YP-280	Off Saipan	24 April 1946	Sank due to unrecorded causes.
YP-281	16°53′S 177°18′W	9 January 1944	Foundered in heavy weather.
YP-284	Off Guadalcanal I., Solomons	25 October 1942	Sunk in action, along with USS Seminole (AT-65), by the Japanese destroyers Akatsuki, Ikazuchi, and Shiratsuyu
YP-289	Buckner Bay, Okinawa	9 October 1945	Wrecked by Typhoon Louise.
YP-331	Gulf of Mexico 24°56′N 81°58′W	23 March 1944	Foundered in heavy weather.
YP-336	In Delaware River	23 February 1943	Grounding.
YP-345	80 miles northeast of Laysan Island, southeast of Midway	31 October 1942	Cause unknown.
YP-346	Off Guadalcanal	9 September 1942	Sunk by Japanese cruiser Sendai and destroyers Fubuki, Shikinami, and Suzukaze
YP-383	Gulf of Panama 8°22′N 79°29′W	24 November 1944	Sunk after collision with USS LCI(L)-873
YP-387	Approximately 7.5 miles NNE of Wildwood, NJ 39°N 75°W	20 May 1942	Sank after collision with the collier SS Jason (ex-AV-2, ex-AC-12).
YP-389	Off Cape Hatteras	19 June 1942	Sunk by gunfire from German submarine U-701.
YP-405	Off Smith Shoal, near Key West, Florida	20 November 1942	Sunk after fire.
YP-422	Tumbo Reef, near Nouméa, New Caledonia	23 April 1943	Grounded or reef and sank.
YP-426	31°59′N 80°48′W Tybee Island, Georgia	16 December 1943	Ran aground and declared a total loss.
YP-438	At Port Everglades, Fla.	20 March 1943	Struck coral reef while under tow and sank.
YP-453	South Bimini, Bahama Islands	5 April 1943	Ran aground and abandoned.
YP-481	At Charleston, S. C.	25 April 1943	Grounded.
YP-492	Off Mayport, Florida	8 January 1943	Sunk in collision with YP-613.
YP-520	Buckner Bay, Okinawa	9 October 1945	Grounded by Typhoon Louise.
YP-577	On Lake Michigan near the Great Lakes Naval Training Center, Illinois.	23 January 1943	Destroyed by explosion of unknown cause.

Only four YPs were lost due to enemy action. Almost all others lost were due to accidents.

== Mine warfare ships ==
=== Minelayers (CM, DM) ===
Name	Hull Number	Location	Date	Cause
Gamble	DM-15	off Iwo Jima	18 February 1945	Damaged by aircraft bombs and later scuttled.
Miantonomah	CM-10	off of Le Havre, France	25 September 1944	Sunk by mine.
Montgomery	DM-17	off Palau	17 October 1944	Severely damaged by a mine. Returned to US and decommissioned on 23 April 1945.
Weehawken	CM-12	Tsuken Shima, Japan	9 October 1945	Broken in two. Decommissioned on 11 December 1945.

=== Destroyer minesweepers (DMS) ===
Name	Hull Number	Location	Date	Cause
Dorsey	DMS-1	Off Okinawa	9 October 1945	Grounded by Typhoon Louise. Destroyed 1 January 1946.
Emmons	DMS-22	26°48′N 128°04′E	6 April 1945	Sunk by Kamikaze aircraft.
Hovey	DMS-11	16°20′N 120°10′E	7 January 1945	Sunk by Japanese torpedo.
Long	DMS-12	16°12′N 120°11′E	6 January 1945	Sunk by Kamikaze aircraft.
Palmer	DMS-5	Lingayen Gulf, Philippines	7 January 1945	Sunk by Japanese bombs.
Perry	DMS-17	Off Palau Island	13 September 1944	Sunk by underwater mine explosion.
Southard	DMS-10	Off Okinawa	9 October 1945	Grounded by Typhoon Louise. Deemed unsalvageable. Destroyed with explosives 14 January 1946.
Wasmuth	DMS-15	Aleutian Islands	29 December 1942	Sunk accidentally by her own depth charges.

=== Minesweepers (AM/AMc) ===
Name	Location	Date	Cause
Bittern	Cavite, Philippines	10 December 1941	Scuttled after being damaged in Japanese air raid
Bunting	San Francisco Bay	3 June 1942	Sunk after collision with patrol craft PC-569
Crow	Puget Sound	23 August 1943	Sunk accidentally by torpedo.
Finch	Corregidor, Philippines	10 April 1942	Sunk due to damage sustained in near-miss of a Japanese bomb.
Hornbill	San Francisco Bay	30 June 1942	Sunk after collision with a lumber schooner.
Osprey	50°12′N 1°20′W	5 June 1944	Sunk by mine.
Penguin	Guam	8 December 1941	Scuttled after damaged by near-miss of Japanese bombs.
Portent	41°23′N 12°43′E	22 January 1944	Sunk by mine.
Quail	Corregidor, Philippines	5 May 1942	Scuttled after damaged in battle.
Redwing	37°22′N 9°55′E	29 June 1943	Probably sunk by a mine. (No claim made by a U-boat.)
Salute	5°07′N 115°04′E	8 June 1945	Sunk by mine.
Sentinel	Off Licata, Sicily	11 July 1943	Sunk by German bombers during the invasion of Sicily.
Skill	40°20′N 14°35′E	25 September 1943	Sunk by torpedo from U-593.
Skylark	26°20′N 127°41′E	28 March 1945	Sunk by mine.
Swallow	Off Okinawa, Ryukyu Islands	22 April 1945	Sunk by Japanese kamikaze.
Swerve	41°31′N 12°28′E	9 July 1944	Sunk by mine.
Tanager	At Corregidor, Philippines	4 May 1942	Sunk by Japanese shore battery.
Tide	49°37′N 1°05′W	7 June 1944	Sunk by German mine off Utah Beach.
Valor	41°28′N 70°57′W	29 June 1944	Sunk after collision with USS Richard W. Suesens in Buzzards Bay.

=== Motor Minesweepers (YMS) ===
Name	Location	Date	Cause
YMS-14	In Boston Harbor	11 January 1945	Sunk in collision with USS Herndon (DD 638).
YMS-19	Off Palau	24 September 1944	Sunk by mine.
YMS-21	43°6′N 5°54′E	1 September 1944	Sunk by mine off Toulon, France.
YMS-24	43°23′N 6°43′E	16 August 1944	Sunk by mine off St. Tropez, France.
YMS-30	41°23′N 12°45′E	25 January 1944	Sunk by mine off Anzio Beach.
YMS-39	1°19′S 116°49′E	26 June 1945	Sunk by mine off Borneo.
YMS-48	14°25′N 120°34′E off Corregidor	14 February 1945	Scuttled after being hit by coast defense gunfire.
YMS-50	Off Balikipapan, N.E.I.	18 June 1945	Struck a mine on 18 June 1945 at and was scuttled by the light cruiser Denver.
YMS-70	In Leyte Gulf, P.I.	17 October 1944	Foundered in storm.
YMS-71	4°58′N 119°47′E	3 April 1945	Sunk by mine off Borneo.
YMS-84	9°19′N 116°48′E	9 July 1945	sunk by mine off Balikpapan, Borneo
YMS-98	Off Okinawa	16 September 1945	Foundered in Typhoon Ida.
YMS-103	26°13′N 127°54′E	8 April 1945	Severely damaged by mines in Buckner Bay, Okinawa, beached and abandoned.
YMS-127	Tanaga Island, Aleutians	10 January 1944	Grounded in a storm. Salvaged and sailed to Seattle, Washington where she was declared a constructive loss and stricken on 16 September 1944.
YMS-133	Off Oregon Coast	20 February 1943	Foundered and sinks off Coos Bay, Oregon.
YMS-146	Off Okinawa	9 October 1945	Foundered in Typhoon Louise.
YMS-275	Off Okinawa	9 October 1945	Grounded by Typhoon Louise. Destroyed in December 1945.
YMS-304	Off Northern France	30 July 1944	Sunk by a mine. 8 dead and 30 injured.
YMS-341	Off Okinawa	16 September 1945	Foundered in Typhoon Ida.
YMS-350	Off Cherbourg	2 July 1944	Sunk by a mine.
YMS-365	1°18′S 116°50′E	26 June 1945	Sunk by a mine and scuttled.
YMS-378	49°33′N 1°13′W	30 July 1944	Damaged by mine and stricken on 16 September 1944.
YMS-383	Off Okinawa	9 October 1945	Foundered in Typhoon Louise.
YMS-385	Zowariau Channel, Ulithi, Caroline Islands	1 October 1944	Sunk by mine.
YMS-409	Off Atlantic Coast	12 September 1944	Foundered off Cape Hatteras in the Great Atlantic hurricane of 1944 with the loss of all hands.
YMS-421	Off Okinawa	16 September 1945	Foundered in Typhoon Ida.
YMS-424	Okinawa, Ryukyu Islands	9 October 1945	Grounded by Typhoon Louise and destroyed on 18 December 1945.
YMS-454	Tsuken Shima, Okinawa	9 October 1945	Grounded by Typhoon Louise. Destroyed on 20 December 1945.
YMS-472	Off Okinawa	16 September 1945	Foundered in Typhoon Ida.
YMS-481	Tarakan Island, off Borneo	2 May 1945	Sunk by shore batteries in the Battle of Tarakan (1945).

== Amphibious warfare ships ==
=== Tank landing ships (LST) ===
Name	Location	Date	Cause
LST-6	English Channel near the Seine River, France	18 November 1944	Struck a German mine.
LST-43	Pearl Harbor	21 May 1944	Fire and accidental explosion.
LST-69	Pearl Harbor	21 May 1944	Fire and accidental explosion. Crewed by Coast Guard.
LST-158	Off Licata, Sicily	11 July 1943	Sunk by German aircraft.
LST-167	At Vella Lavella	25 September 1943	Bombed by Japanese aircraft. Crewed by Coast Guard.
LST-179	Pearl Harbor	21 May 1944	Fire and accidental explosion.
LST-203	Near Nanumea, Ellice Islands	1 October 1943	Grounded.
LST-228	In Azores	20 January 1944	Grounded.
LST-282	Off Southern France	15 August 1944	Hit by a German glider bomb and heavily damaged. Beached and abandoned.
LST-313	At Gela, Sicily	10 July 1943	Sunk by German aircraft.
LST-314	49°43′N 00°52′W	9 June 1944	Sunk by German torpedo boat.
LST-318	Off Caronia, Sicily	9 August 1943	Sunk by German aircraft.
LST-333	36°59′N 4°01′E	22 June 1943	Torpedoed by U-593 eight miles northeast of Cape Corbelin, Algeria. Towed and beached near Dellys and declared a total loss.
LST-342	9°03′S 158°11′E	18 July 1943	Torpedoed by Japanese submarine Ro-106.
LST-348	40°57′N 13°14′E	20 February 1944	Torpedoed by U-410 north of Naples, Italy.
LST-349	Off Ponza, Italy	26 February 1944	Grounded.
LST-353	Pearl Harbor	21 May 1944	Fire and accidental explosion.
LST-359	42°N 19°W	20 December 1944	Sunk by U-870.
LST-376	English Channel	9 June 1944	Torpedoed and sunk by a German surface craft.
LST-396	8°18′S 156°55′E	18 August 1943	Explosion.
LST-447	26°9′N 127°18′E	6 April 1945	Sunk by a Kamikaze aircraft.
LST-448	Off Vella Lavella, Solomons	1 October 1943	Damaged by Japanese dive bombers and sank while under tow.
LST-460	11°10′N 121°11′E	21 December 1944	Sunk by Kamikaze.
LST-472	Off Mindoro, Philippines	15 December 1944	Sunk by Kamikaze.
LST-480	At Pearl Harbor	21 May 1944	Fire and accidental explosion.
LST-493	50°20′N 4°09′W	12 April 1945	Grounded.
LST-496	Off Normandy, France	11 June 1944	Mine.
LST-499	Off Normandy, France	8 June 1944	Mine.
LST-507	50°29′N 2°52′W	28 April 1944	Torpedoed by a German E-boat during Exercise Tiger.
LST-523	Off Normandy, France	19 June 1944	Mine.
LST-531	50°29′N 2°52′W	28 April 1944	Torpedoed by a German E-boat during Exercise Tiger.
LST-563	Clipperton Island	22 December 1944	Grounded.
LST-568	Okinawa	9 October 1945	Grounded. Refloated next day. Towed to Philippines and scuttled off of Samar on 7 March 1946.
LST-577	8°1′N 130°22′E	11 February 1945	Hit by 2 torpedoes from Japanese submarine Ro-50.
LST-675	Off Okinawa	4 April 1945	Severely damaged by enemy action and not repaired.
LST-738	Off Mindoro, P.I.	15 December 1944	Hit by Japanese aircraft.
LST-749	11°10′N 121°11′E	21 December 1944	Hit by a Kamikaze aircraft.
LST-750	Off Negros, P.I.	28 December 1944	Sunk by Japanese aircraft.
LST-808	Off Ie Shima	18 May 1945	Struck by aerial torpedo and grounded on a coral reef. Hit by Kamikaze on 20 May and damaged beyond repair. Destroyed in place on 1 November 1945.
LST-826	Okinawa	9 October 1945	Grounded. Scrapped in 1947.
LST-884	Okinawa	1 April 1945	Severely damaged by Kamikaze and not returned to operational status. Decommissioned on 16 February 1946 and hulk sunk on 6 May 1946.
LST-906	At Leghorn, Italy	18 October 1944	Grounded by a storm and not repaired.
LST-921	In English Channel	14 August 1944	Torpedoed by U-667

=== Medium landing ships (LSM) ===
Name	Location	Date	Cause
LSM-12	Off Okinawa	4 April 1945	Beached and broken up.
LSM-15	Buckner Bay, Okinawa	9 October 1945	Foundered in Typhoon Louise.
LSM-20	10°12′N 125°19′E	5 December 1944	Sunk by Kamikaze.
LSM-59	Off Okinawa	21 June 1945	Sunk by Kamikaze.
LSM-135	Off Okinawa	25 May 1945	Sunk by Kamikaze.
LSM-149	Off Philippines	5 or 14 December 1944	Grounded.
LSM(R)-190	26°35′N 127°10′E	4 May 1945	Stuck and sunk by two Kamikazes.
LSM-194	Off Okinawa	4 May 1945	Sunk by Kamikaze.
LSM-195	Off Okinawa	3 May 1945	Sunk by Kamikaze.
LSM-318	10°56′N 124°38′E	7 December 1944	Sunk by Kamikaze.

=== Tank landing craft (LCT) ===
Name	Location	Date	Cause
LCT-19	Off Salerno, Italy	15 September 1943	Sunk by German aircraft.
LCT-21	Off Oran, Algeria	1 January 1943	Lost on board the merchant Arthur Middleton that was sunk by the German submarine U-73.
LCT-23	At Algiers	3 May 1943	Underwater explosion.
LCT-25	Normandy, France	6 June 1944	Destroyed by German coast artillery.
LCT-26	41°4′N 13°30′E Gulf of Gaeta, Italy	25 February 1944	Lost in a storm.
LCT-27	Omaha Beach, Normandy, France	6 June 1944	Grounded and later capsized.
LCT-28	In Mediterranean	30 May 1943	Stuck a mine.
LCT-30	Omaha Beach, Normandy, France	6 June 1944	Disabled by artillery shell and abandoned.
LCT-35	Off Anzio, Italy	15 February 1944	Sunk by German aircraft.
LCT-36	Off Naples, Italy	26 February 1944	Grounded.
LCT-66	At Pearl Harbor	12 April 1945	Lost in non-combat incident.
LCT-71	53°38′N 146°5′W Gulf of Alaska	11 September 1943	Lost in heavy seas while under tow.
LCT-147	Normandy, France	6 June 1944	Sank after running aground.
LCT-154	37°8′N 10°58′E Off Cape Bon, Tunisia	31 August 1943	Foundered while under tow.
LCT-175	4°27′N 133°40′E off Palau	21 February 1945	Foundered and capsized in a storm.
LCT-182	Off Wana Wana Island, New Georgia Group	7 August 1944	Foundered.
LCT-185	Off Bizerte, Tunisia	24 January 1944	Foundered in a storm.
LCT-196	Off Salerno, Italy	27 September 1943	Buckled in heavy seas while under tow.
LCT-197	Normandy, France	6 June 1944	Sunk by mine.
LCT-200	Normandy, France	6 June 1944	Severely damaged during amphibious operations and later sank.
LCT-208	Off Algeria	20 June 1943	Grounded and later disposed.
LCT-209	Normandy, France	10 June 1944	Grounded.
LCT-215	Off Salerno, Italy	7 October 1943	Foundered in heavy seas.
LCT-220	Off Anzio, Italy	13 February 1944	Foundered in storm.
LCT-241	Off Salerno, Italy	15 September 1943	Lost in air attack.
LCT-242	Off Naples, Italy	2 December 1943	Sunk by a circling torpedo
LCT-244	Off Omaha Beach, Normandy, France	8 June 1944	Foundered.
LCT-253	On Passage To Tarawa	21 January 1945	Foundered en route to Tarawa in the Gilbert Islands area.
LCT-293	In English Channel	11 October 1944	Foundered in a storm.
LCT-294	Off Northern France	6 June 1944	Struck a mine and sunk.
LCT-305	Off Northern France	6 June 1944	Destroyed during the invasion of Normandy.
LCT-311	Off Bizerte, Tunisia	9 August 1943	Sunk by naval gunfire.
LCT-315	At Eniwetok Atoll	23 March 1944	Sunk by an explosion of unknown origin.
LCT-319	Kiska Island, Alaska	27 August 1943	Grounded.
LCT-332	Normandy, France	6 June 1944	Damaged on beach in Normandy and abandoned.
LCT-340	37°21′N 11°11′E	9 February 1944	Foundered in storm near Cape Bon, Tunisia
LCT-342	Off Salerno, Italy	29 September 1943	Grounded.
LCT-352	At Pearl Harbor	12 April 1945	Sunk due to unspecified cause.
LCT-362	Off Northern France	6 June 1944	Lost due to weather en route to Normandy invasion.
LCT-364	Off Normandy, France	6 June 1944	Sunk by German naval mine.
LCT-366	53°1′N 152°0′W	9 September 1943	Foundered in heavy seas.
LCT-413	Normandy, France	6 June 1944	Lost during amphibious operations.
LCT-458	Off Northern France	7 June 1944	Sunk by German naval mine.
LCT-459	Off Western France	19 September 1944	Grounded.
LCT-486	Off Utah Beach, Normandy, France	7 June 1944	Sunk by enemy action.
LCT-496	English Channel	2 October 1943	Sunk by German artillery fire.
LCT-548	Off Portsmouth, England	November 1944	Lost due to weather.
LCT-555	Off Normandy, France	6 June 1944	Sunk by German naval mine.
LCT-572	Off Normandy, France	6 June 1944	Sunk by German naval mine.
LCT-579	Off Angaur Island, Palau	1 October 1944	Sunk by mine.
LCT-582	Off Bahia Angra Island, Azores	22 January 1944	Lost due to grounding of LST-228 while being transported.
LCT-593	Off Normandy, France	6 June 1944	Sunk by German naval mine.
LCT-597	Off Northern France	6 June 1944	Sunk by German naval mine.
LCT-612	Off Northern France	6 June 1944	Sunk by enemy gunfire.
LCT-703	Off Northern France	6 June 1944	Sunk after striking a mine.
LCT-713	Off Normandy, France	6 June 1944	Sunk by mine.
LCT-714	Off Normandy, France	6 June 1944	Sunk by mine.
LCT-777	Off Normandy, France	6 June 1944	Sunk by German naval mine.
LCT-823	Off Palau	27 September 1944	Grounded.
LCT-961	Pearl Harbor	21 May 1944	Lost due to explosion at West Loch, Pearl Harbor.
LCT-963	Pearl Harbor	21 May 1944	Lost due to explosion at West Loch, Pearl Harbor.
LCT-983	Pearl Harbor	21 May 1944	Lost due to explosion at West Loch, Pearl Harbor.
LCT-984	20°N 157°W Near Hawaii.	15 May 1944	Lost in a storm.
LCT-988	20°N 157°W Near Hawaii.	15 May 1944	Lost in a storm.
LCT-995	At Guam	21 April 1945	Sunk due to unspecified cause.
LCT-1029	At Iwo Jima	2 March 1945	Driven ashore and sustained irreparable damage.
LCT-1050	Off Ie Shima, Ryukyu Islands	27 July 1945	Sunk by blast from Japanese ariel torpedo while moored next to cargo ship Pratt Victory.
LCT-1075	Off Leyte, P.I.	10 December 1944	Hit and sunk by kamikaze.
LCT-1090	Off Luzon, P.I.	26 March 1945	Sunk due to unspecified cause.
LCT-1151	1°0′N 138°36′E	26 January 1945	Lost during amphibious operations.
LCT-1358	Off California	4 May 1945	Lost due to grounding.

=== Infantry landing craft (LCI(L), LCI(G)) ===
Name	Location	Date	Cause
LCI(L)-1	At Bizerte, Tunisia	17 August 1943	Sunk due to enemy action.
LCI(L)-20	Off Anzio, Italy	22 January 1944	Sunk by enemy aircraft.
LCI(L)-32	Off Anzio, Italy	26 January 1944	Lost due to enemy action.
LCI(G)-82	Off Okinawa	4 April 1945	Lost due to enemy action.
LCI(L)-85	Normandy, France	6 June 1944	Disabled by German coast artillery. Coast Guard crew.
LCI(L)-91	Omaha Beach, Normandy, France	6 June 1944	Disabled by German coast artillery. Coast Guard crew.
LCI(L)-92	Omaha Beach, Normandy, France	6 June 1944	Disabled by German coast artillery. Coast Guard crew.
LCI(L)-93	Omaha Beach, Normandy, France	6 June 1944	Disabled by German coast artillery. Coast Guard crew.
LCI(L)-219	Off Northern France	11 June 1944	Lost due to enemy action.
LCI(L)-232	Off Northern France	6 June 1944	Lost due to enemy action.
LCI(L)-339	Off New Guinea	4 September 1943	Bombed by Japanese aircraft.
LCI(G)-365	Lingayen Gulf, P.I.	10 January 1945	Sunk by Japanese suicide boat.
LCI(G)-459	Off Palau	19 September 1944	Lost due to enemy action.
LCI(G)-468	13°28′N 148°18′E	17 June 1944	Seriously damaged by Japanese torpedo planes en route to Saipan and was scuttled by USS Stembel (DD-644).
LCI(G)-474	Off Iwo Jima	17 February 1945	Sunk by Japanese shore artillery. Ship awarded Presidential Unit Citation.
LCI(L)-497	Off Normandy, France	6 June 1944	Sunk by German mine.
LCI(L)-553	Off Normandy, France	6 June 1944	Sunk by enemy gunfire.
LCI(L)-600	In Ulithi, Carolines	12 January 1945	Sunk by Kaiten suicide torpedo deployed from submarine I-36
LCI(L)-684	Off Samar, P.I.	12 November 1944	Lost due to enemy action.
LCI(L)-974	16°6′N 120°14′E Lingayen Gulf, P.I.	10 January 1945	Sunk by Japanese suicide boat.
LCI(L)-1065	Off Leyte, P.I.	24 October 1944	Sunk by kamikaze.

=== Support landing craft (LCS) ===
Name	Location	Date	Cause
LCS-7	Off Luzon, P.I.	16 February 1945	Sunk by Japanese assault demolition boats off entrance to Mariveles harbor.
LCS-15	27°20′N 127°10′E	22 April 1945	Sunk by Japanese aircraft.
LCS-26	Off Luzon, P.I.	16 February 1945	Sunk by Japanese shore batteries.
LCS-33	Off Okinawa	12 April 1945	Sunk by Japanese kamikaze aircraft.
LCS-49	Off Luzon, P.I.	16 February 1945	Sunk by Japanese shore batteries.
LCS-127	Off San Clemente Island, California	5 March 1945	Grounded during an exercise.

== Auxiliaries ==
=== Seaplane tenders (AV, AVP, AVD) ===
Name	Hull Number	Location	Date	Cause
Gannet	AVP-28	Off Bermuda	7 June 1942	Torpedoed by German submarine U-653.
Langley	AV-3	8°51′S 109°2′E, Off Tjilatjap Harbor, Indonesia	27 February 1942	Scuttled at sea after being heavily damaged by Aichi D3A1 "Val" dive bombers.
Thornton	AVD-11	24°24′N 128°58′E	5 April 1945	Beached and abandoned on 2 May 1945 after collision with Ashtabula and Escalante.

=== Cargo ships (AK/AKS) ===
Name	Hull Number	Location	Date	Cause
Aludra	AK-72	11°26′S 162°0′E	23 June 1943	Torpedoed by Japanese submarine Ro-103.
Atik	AK-101	36°N 70°W	26 March 1942	Sunk by U-123 while serving as a Q ship.
Deimos	AK-78	11°26′S 162°0′E	23 June 1943	Torpedoed by Japanese submarine Ro-103.
Etamin	AK-93	Milne Bay, Papua, New Guinea	27 April 1944	Torpedoed by Japanese submarine and disabled. Repurposed as a cargo barge and redesignated as IX-173 on 12 August 1944.
Pollux	AKS-2	Lawn Point, Newfoundland	18 February 1942	Grounded and wrecked in a storm.
Serpens	AK-97	Guadalcanal, Solomon Islands	29 January 1945	Crewed by Coast Guard. Destroyed by accidental explosion of munitions onboard. 249 killed - 197 Coast Guard, 51 Army and 1 US Public Health Service. Largest loss of life event in Coast Guard history.

=== Net layers (AN) ===
Name	Location	Date	Cause
Ailanthus (AN-38)	Tanaga Island, Aleutian Islands	26 February 1944	Ran aground during a storm.
Mahogany (AN-23)	Buckner Bay, Okinawa	14 September 1945	Grounded on a reef by Typhoon Ida. Not repaired and scuttled on 19 April 1946.
Snowbell (AN-52)	Off Okinawa	9 October 1945	Grounded by Typhoon Louise. Destroyed with explosives 14 January 1946.

=== Oilers (AO) ===
Name	Location	Date	Cause
Kanawha (AO-1)	9°10′S 160°12′E	8 April 1943	Damaged by Japanese aircraft on 7 April 1943 off Tulagi, Solomon Islands. Sank the next day.
Mississinewa (AO-59)	10°6′N 139°43′E	20 November 1944	Sunk by a Japanese Kaiten manned torpedo.
Neches (AO-5)	21°1′N 160°6′W	23 January 1942	Torpedoed and sunk by Japanese submarine I-72.
Neosho (AO-23)	Coral Sea	11 May 1942	Sunk on 11 May 1942, after being heavily damaged during the Battle of the Coral Sea on 7 May 1942.
Pecos (AO-6)	14°30′S 106°30′E	1 March 1942	Sunk by Japanese airplanes from aircraft carrier Soryū.

=== Gasoline tankers (AOG) ===
Name	Location	Date	Cause
Sheepscot (AOG-24)	Off Iwo Jima	6 June 1945	Ran aground and capsized near Iwo Jima. Coast Guard crew.

=== Troop transports (AP/APA/APc) ===
Name	Location	Date	Cause
APc-21	Off New Britain	17 December 1943	Hit by aerial bomb.
APc-35	Off New Georgia, Solomons	22 September 1943	Grounded and abandoned.
Edward Rutledge (AP-52)	Off Morocco	12 November 1942	Sunk after being torpedoed by German submarine U-130.
George F. Elliott (AP-13)	Off Guadalcanal, Solomon Islands	8 August 1942	Struck by Japanese "Betty" bomber.
Hugh L. Scott (AP-43)	Off Morocco	12 November 1942	Sunk after being torpedoed by German submarine U-130.
John Penn (APA-23)	Off Guadalcanal, Solomon Islands	13 August 1943	Sunk after being torpedoed by Japanese aircraft.
Joseph Hewes (AP-50)	Off Morocco	11 November 1942	Sunk after being torpedoed by German submarine U-173.
Lafayette (AP-53)	Pier 88, Manhattan	9 February 1942	Former French luxury liner SS Normandie and one of the largest ships in the world. Caught fire and capsized while undergoing conversion to a troop transport. Deemed unsalvageable and later scrapped.
Leedstown (AP-73)	Off Algiers	9 November 1942	Sunk after being torpedoed by German aircraft.
McCawley (APA-4)	8°25′S 157°28′E	30 June 1943	Torpedoed by Japanese aircraft and later accidentally sunk by US PT boats.
Susan B. Anthony (AP-72)	49°32′N 00°48′W	7 June 1944	Sunk by a mine off Normandy, France.
Tasker H. Bliss (AP-42)	Off Morocco	12 November 1942	Sunk after being torpedoed by German submarine U-130.
Thomas Stone (AP-59)	37°31′N 00°00′E	7 November 1942	Torpedoed by German U-205 and/or aircraft off Cape Palos, Spain. Towed to Algiers and never repaired. Struck on 8 April 1944 and hulk sold for scrap.

=== High speed transports (APD) ===
Name	Location	Date	Cause
Barry (APD-29)	Off Okinawa	25 May 1945	Severely damaged by Kamikaze. Stricken on 21 June 1945.
Bates (APD-47)	Off Okinawa	25 May 1945	Struck by Kamikaze.
Colhoun (APD-2)	9°24′S 160°1′E off Guadalcanal	30 August 1942	Bombed by Japanese aircraft.
Dickerson (APD-21)	Off Okinawa	2 April 1945	Hit by Kamikaze. Scuttled on 4 April 1945.
Greene (APD-36)	Kudaka Island, off Okinawa	9 October 1945	Grounded by Typhoon Louise and not repaired. Decommissioned and destroyed.
Gregory (APD-3)	Off Guadalcanal, Solomon Islands	5 September 1942	Sunk by gunfire from the Japanese destroyers Yūdachi, Hatsuyuki, and Murakumo
Little (APD-4)	Solomons	5 September 1942	Sunk by gunfire from the Japanese destroyers Yūdachi, Hatsuyuki, and Murakumo
McKean (APD-5)	6°31′S 154°52′E	17 November 1943	Sunk after being torpedoed by Japanese aircraft.
Noa (APD-24)	71°0′N 134°30′E	12 September 1944	Sunk after collision with USS Fullam.
Ward (APD-16)	10°51′N 124°32′E	7 December 1944	Sunk by Kamikaze aircraft.

=== Barracks ships (APL) ===
Name	Location	Date	Cause
APL-12	Yonakuni Shima, Okinawa, Ryukyu Islands	2 October 1945	Intentionally beached due to Typhoon Louise. Refloated 24 October 1945. Blown up on 26 January 1946.
APL-13	Chinen Misaki, Okinawa, Ryukyu Islands	9 October 1945	Grounded by Typhoon Louise. Out of service 28 December 1945. Later blown up.
APL-33	Off Okinawa, Ryukyu Islands	9 October 1945	Grounded by Typhoon Louise. Later blown up.

=== Repair ships (ARS/ARL) ===
Name	Location	Date	Cause
Bellona (ARL-32)	Kama Rock, Iwo Jima	1 December 1945	Grounded on Iwo Jima on 1 December 1945. Stripped and blown up 14 May 1946.
Extractor (ARS-15)	In Marianas	24 January 1945	Sunk by torpedo from US submarine USS Guardfish (SS-217).
Extricate (ARS-16)	Okinawa	9 October 1945	Severely damaged and beached by Typhoon Louise and destroyed with explosives 4 March 1946.
Nestor (ARB-6)	Okinawa	9 October 1945	Grounded by Typhoon Louise and later destroyed.
Rescuer (ARS-18)	Aleutian Islands	1 January 1943	Beached and severely damaged by a gale.

=== Submarine rescue ships (ASR) ===
Name	Location	Date	Cause
Macaw (ASR-11)	At Midway Channel	12 February 1944	Foundered in a storm.
Pigeon (ASR-6)	At Corregidor, P.I.	3 May 1942	Sunk by Japanese dive bomber.

=== Tugboats (AT/ATA/ATF/ATR) ===
Name	Location	Date	Cause
ATA-191	Buckner Bay, Okinawa	9 October 1945	Grounded and partially sunk in a typhoon. Not repaired, hulk destroyed on 29 December 1945.
ATR-15	49°20′N 00°26′W off Normandy	19 June 1944	Severely damaged in a storm. Not repaired. Hulk scuttled in mid-1946.
ATR-98	44°05′N 24°08′W off the Azores	12 April 1944	Repair tugboat. Sunk in collision with USS Abnaki (ATF-96).
Genesee	At Corregidor, P.I.	5 May 1942	Scuttled to prevent capture. Raised by the Japanese and designated Patrol Boat No. 107; Sunk by US aircraft, 5 November 1944.
Grebe	South of Fiji Islands	5 December 1942	Grounded and later destroyed by a hurricane.
Napa	At Bataan, P.I.	8 April 1942	Scuttled to prevent capture.
Nauset	40°38′N 14°38′E	9 September 1943	Sunk by bombs from German aircraft.
Navajo	Off New Hebrides	11 September 1943	Sunk by Japanese submarine I-39
Partridge	Off Northern France	11 June 1944	Torpedoed by a German E-boat.
Ranger	Philippine Islands	After 28 February 1942	Commandeered Filipino tugboat. Fate unknown. Probably captured or destroyed by Japanese.
Seminole	Off Tulagi Island, Solomons	25 October 1942	Sunk by gunfire from Japanese destroyers.
Sonoma	At Leyte, P.I.	24 October 1944	Hit by shot down Japanese bomber.
Tamaroa	San Francisco Bay, California	27 January 1946	Collision with USS Jupiter (AVS-8).
Trabajador	Near Corregidor, Philippines	10 April 1942	Commandeered Filipino tugboat. Likely sunk by Japanese gunfire.
Wateree	Buckner Bay, Okinawa	9 October 1945	Sank during typhoon.

=== Other auxiliaries ===
Name	Location	Date	Cause
AFD-13	Off Okinawa, Ryukyu Islands	16 September 1945	Floating dry dock. Sunk by Typhoon Ida.
Robert L. Barnes (AG-27), ex-(AO-14)	Guam, Marianas Islands	10 December 1941	Oil storage ship. Captured in port, taken into Japanese service and survived the war.
Canopus (AS-9)	At Bataan, Philippines	10 April 1942	Submarine tender. Immobilized by Japanese aircraft bombs on 29 December 1941 but continued to support defenders of the Philippines. Scuttled to prevent capture.
Mount Hood (AE-11)	At Manus, Admiralty Islands	10 November 1944	Ammunition ship. Disintegrated by internal explosion of undetermined cause.
Niagara (AGP-1)	Solomon Islands	23 May 1943	Engine repair ship. Sunk by Japanese aircraft.
Pontiac (AF-20)	Off Halifax, Nova Scotia	30 January 1945	Refrigerated cargo ship. Intentionally beached after flooding. Salvaged on 17 February 1945, but not returned to active service.
Utah (AG-16), ex-(BB-31)	21°22′N 157°57′W, Pearl Harbor	7 December 1941	Former Florida class battleship converted to a gunnery training and target ship. Capsized after two torpedo hits by carrier-based aircraft. Recovery was attempted but stopped. Memorial dedicated in 1972.

=== Unclassified miscellaneous (IX) ===
Name	Location	Date	Cause
America (IX-41)	Annapolis, Maryland	29 March 1942	Famous racing yacht. Destroyed by the collapse of a snow covered shed.
Asphalt (IX-153)	Saipan, Northern Mariana Islands	6 October 1944	Concrete barge. Grounded in a storm and stricken on 23 February 1945.
Canandaigua (IX-233)	New London, Connecticut	22 November 1945	Auxiliary sailing schooner which was previously used by the US Coast Guard Academy for cadet training. Foundered at pierside due to damage caused by a storm. Raised and placed out of service on 5 January 1946. Stricken on 12 April 1946.
Cinnabar (IX-163)	Okinawa	9 October 1945	Concrete barge. Grounded by Typhoon Louise. Placed out of service on 3 January 1946.
Lignite (IX-162)	Okinawa	9 October 1945	Concrete barge. Wrecked by Typhoon Louise. Broke away under tow and grounded on a reef off Eli Malk in Palau. Struck from Navy List on 28 August 1946.
Ocelot (IX-110)	Okinawa	9 October 1945	Service squadron flagship. Sunk by collision with USS Nestor during Typhoon Louise. Abandoned on 29 October 1945 and decommissioned on 6 December 1945.
Porcupine (IX-126)	At Mindoro, P.I.	30 December 1944	Station tanker. Sunk by Kamikaze plane.
Ronaki (IX-94)	Norfolk Island	18 June 1943	Auxiliary cargo schooner. Grounded on a reef and not salvaged. Struck on 15 July 1943.
Silica (IX-151)	Buckner Bay, Okinawa	9 October 1945	Concrete barge. Grounded by Typhoon Louise and abandoned. Decommissioned on 30 November 1945 and struck on 3 January 1946.
Vandalia (IX-191)	Buckner Bay, Okinawa	9 October 1945	Station tanker. Grounded by Typhoon Louise and abandoned. Stricken on 5 December 1945 and sold for scrap.
DCH-1 (IX-44), ex-Walker (ex YW-57, ex DD-163)	Eastern Pacific Ocean	28 December 1941	Former destroyer converted to damage control hulk. Cast adrift while under tow en route to Pearl Harbor and scuttled by gunfire.

== District craft ==
=== Uncovered lighters (YC) ===
Name	Location	Date	Cause
YC-178	Philippines	1942	
YC-181	Philippines	1942	
YC-523	Off Portsmouth, N. H.	24 February 1944	Ran aground.
YC-537	Philippines	1942	
YC-643	Philippines	1942	
YC-644	Philippines	1942	
YC-646	Philippines	1942	
YC-647	Philippines	1942	
YC-648	Philippines	1942	
YC-649	Philippines	1942	
YC-652	Philippines	1942	
YC-653	Philippines	1942	
YC-654	Philippines	1942	
YC-664	Guam	10 December 1941	
YC-665	Guam	10 December 1941	
YC-666	Guam	10 December 1941	
YC-667	Guam	10 December 1941	
YC-668	Guam	10 December 1941	
YC-669	Philippines	1942	
YC-670	Guam	10 December 1941	
YC-671	Guam	10 December 1941	
YC-672	Guam	10 December 1941	
YC-673	Guam	10 December 1941	
YC-674	Guam	10 December 1941	
YC-683	Philippines	1942	
YC-685	Guam	10 December 1941	
YC-693	Alaska	1 February 1945	
YC-714	Philippines	1942	
YC-715	Philippines	1942	
YC-716	Philippines	1942	
YC-717	Guam	10 December 1941	
YC-718	Guam	10 December 1941	
YC-857	Off Cape Cod, Mass.	12 November 1943	
YC-869	Off Imperial Beach, Calif.	23 March 1943	
YC-886	Guantanamo	3 February 1943	
YC-887	Guantanamo	3 February 1943	
YC-891	Off Key West, Fla.	18 April 1945	Sank while under tow by the tug USS Mauvila.
YC-898	Off Key West, Fla.	29 September 1942	
YC-899	Off Key West, Fla.	29 September 1942	
YC-912	In North Pacific	13 January 1945	
YC-961	At Biorka Island	1 May 1945	
YC-970	In Puget Sound, Wash.	14 August 1943	
YC-1272	Near San Pedro, Calif.	June 1945	
YC-1278	Off Atlantic Coast	10 March 1943	
YCF-23	En Route To Eniwetok	March 1945	
YCF-29	En Route To Eniwetok	March 1945	
YCF-36	En Route To Eniwetok	March 1945	
YCF-37	En Route To Eniwetok	March 1945	
YCF-42	34°47′N 75°5′W	6 December 1944	Broke in half and sank in heavy seas while under tow by ATA-181.
YCF-59	Off Delaware	January 1945	
YCK-1	Wake Island	23 December 1941	
YCK-2	45°47′N 58°57′W	5 November 1943	
YCK-8	Off Key West, Fla.	13 December 1943	Under tow by U.S. Army tugboat LT-4.

=== Covered lighters (YF) ===
Name	Location	Date	Cause
YF-86	Philippines	1942	
YF-177	Philippines	1942	
YF-178	Philippines	1942	
YF-179	Philippines	1942	
YF-180	Philippines	1942	
YF-181	Philippines	1942	
YF-212	Philippines	1942	
YF-223	Philippines	1942	
YF-224	Philippines	1942	
YF-230	Philippines	1942	
YF-317	Philippines	1942	
YF-401	35°7′N 69°0′W	20 June 1943	Sank in a storm between North Carolina and Bermuda.
YF-415	42°24′N 70°36′W; 14 miles off Boston, Massachusetts.	11 May 1944	Exploded while disposing of explosives. 17 sailors were killed.
YF-487	Caribbean Sea	18 July 1943	Sank from unrecorded causes.
YF-575	Off Atlantic City, N.J.	6 May 1943	Ran aground and sank.
YF-579	Off San Francisco	20 September 1943	Sprang a leak and sank.
YF-724	Off Farallone Islands	22 March 1945	Foundered in heavy weather.
YF-725	Off Farallone Islands	22 March 1945	Foundered in heavy weather.
YF-757	Buckner Bay, Okinawa	9 October 1945	Wrecked by Typhoon Louise.
YF-777	At Eniwetok	6 August 1945	
YF-926	En Route Pearl Harbor	8 March 1945	
YF-1079	Buckner Bay, Okinawa	9 October 1945	Former LST-39. Wrecked by Typhoon Louise. Stricken on 25 February 1946 and destroyed in August 1946.

=== Ferry boats (YFB) ===
Name	Location	Date	Cause
San Felipe	Corregidor, Philippines	6 May 1942	Captured by Imperial Japanese Army and used as a transport. Ultimate fate unknown.
Santa Rita	Cavite Navy Yard, Philippines	2 January 1942	Scuttled to prevent capture.
Rosal	Corregidor, Philippines	6 May 1942	Lost due to enemy action.
Camia	Corregidor, Philippines	10 April 1942	Sunk by Japanese gunfire.
Dapdap	Cavite, Philippines	2 January 1942	Lost to Japanese forces.
Rivera	Cavite Navy Yard, Philippines	2 January 1942	Scuttled to prevent capture.
Magdalena	Mariveles, Philippines	2 January 1942	Sunk by Japanese bombing.
Yacal	Cavite Navy Yard, Philippines	2 January 1942	Scuttled to prevent capture.

=== Floating dry docks (YFD) ===
Name	Location	Date	Cause
Dewey (YFD-1)	Mariveles, Bataan, P.I.	10 April 1942	Scuttled to prevent capture.
YFD-20	Near Bolinas, California	31 January 1943	Lost while in tow from Eureka and stranded.

=== Salvage pontoons (YSP) ===
Name	Location	Date	Cause
YSP-41	Philippines	1942	Lost due to enemy action and stricken on 24 July 1942.
YSP-42	Philippines	1942	Lost due to enemy action and stricken on 24 July 1942.
YSP-43	Philippines	1942	Lost due to enemy action and stricken on 24 July 1942.
YSP-44	Philippines	22 February 1942	Sunk by Japanese forces.
YSP-45	Philippines	1942	Lost due to enemy action and stricken on 24 July 1942.
YSP-46	Philippines	22 February 1942	Sunk by Japanese forces.
YSP-47	Philippines	22 February 1942	Sunk by Japanese forces.
YSP-48	Philippines	22 February 1942	Sunk by Japanese forces.
YSP-49	Philippines	22 February 1942	Sunk by Japanese forces.
YSP-50	Philippines	1942	Lost due to enemy action and stricken on 24 July 1942.

=== Yard oilers (YO, YON) ===
Name	Location	Date	Cause
YO-41	Cavite Navy Yard, Philippines	22 February 1942	Destroyed by enemy action.
YO-42	Cavite Navy Yard, Philippines	22 February 1942	Destroyed by enemy action.
YO-64	Cavite Navy Yard, Philippines	January 1942	Destroyed by enemy action.
YO-156	At Sitka, Alaska	May 1945	Cause not recorded.
YO-157	At Sitka, Alaska	May 1945	Cause not recorded.
YO-159	Off New Hebrides	14 January 1944	Torpedoed by Japanese submarine Ro-42.
YO-160	Bikini Atoll	25 July 1946	Expended in nuclear bomb test.
YO-161	Eniwetok	29 November 1946	Destroyed as a hulk.
YON-184	Eniwetok	September 1946	Sank in Typhoon.
YO-185	off Saipan	16 March 1946	Cause undetermined.

=== Harbor tugboats (YT, YTM) ===
Name	Location	Date	Cause
Banaag	Subic Bay, Philippines	25 December 1941	Probably destroyed during the Japanese occupation of the Olongapo Naval Station.
Iona	Cavite Navy Yard, Philippines	3 January 1942	Bombed and sunk in an air raid.
Mercedes	Cavite Naval Base, Philippines	2 January 1942	Destroyed to prevent capture.
Vaga (YT-116)	Off Corregidor, P.I.	5 May 1942	Scuttled at Naval Base Manila to prevent capture. Raised by Japanese and renamed Taiyo Maru. Sunk by US aircraft about 15 January 1944.
YT-198	Off Anzio, Italy	18 February 1944	Sunk by mine.
YT-247	14°14′N 158°59′W	5 April 1944	Foundered while under tow to Palmyra, Western Australia.
Shahaka	27°21′N 136°29′W	9 May 1944	Sunk after colliding with ABSD-2 midway between the California coast and the Hawaiian Islands.
YTM-467	Marshall or Gilbert Islands	March 1944	No sources have been found which confirm the fate of YTM-467.
YTM-471	Unknown	17 June 1946	Sunk by undocumented causes.

=== Water barges (YW) ===
Name	Location	Date	Cause
YW-50	Guam	10 December 1941	Captured by Japanese forces.
YW-54	Philippines	1942	Destroyed by Japanese forces.
YW-55	Guam	10 December 1941	Captured by Japanese forces.
YW-58	Guam	10 December 1941	Captured by Japanese forces.

=== Other district craft ===
Name	Location	Date	Cause
YA-52	Philippines	1942	Lost due to enemy action and stricken on 24 July 1942.
YA-59	Philippines	1942	Lost due to enemy action and stricken on 24 July 1942.
YA-65	Philippines	1942	Lost due to enemy action and stricken on 24 July 1942.
YAG-2	Philippines	10 December 1941	Destroyed by enemy aircraft during attack on Cavite Navy Yard. Later salvaged and used by Japanese.
YAG-3	Philippines	May 1942	Either sunk by Japanese or destroyed to prevent capture.
YAG-4	Philippines	12 April 1942	Sunk by Japanese gunfire.
YAG-17	36°57′N 76°13′W	14 September 1944	Grounded and severely damaged in a storm. Decommissioned on 2 January 1945 and stricken on 23 February 1945. Former sailing cargo barkentine.
YD-19	Cavite Navy Yard, Philippines	2 January 1942	Destroyed by enemy action.
YD-47	Cavite Navy Yard, Philippines	2 January 1942	Destroyed by enemy action.
YD-56	Cavite Navy Yard, Philippines	1942	Destroyed by enemy action.
YD-60	Cavite Navy Yard, Philippines	1942	Destroyed by enemy action.
YDG-4	Off New Caledonia	1 October 1943	Struck a reef and broke up.
YG-39	10°10′N 79°51′W	27 September 1944	Lost under tow about 50 miles northwest of Colon, Panama.
YG-44	At Pearl Harbor	7 February 1945	Sunk and later raised and stricken.
YM-4	Philippines	22 February 1942	Lost due to enemy action.
YM-13	Guam	10 December 1941	Captured by Japanese forces.
YPD-22	Philippines	1942	Lost due to enemy action.
YPK-6	Philippines	1942	Lost due to enemy action.
YPK-7	Philippines	1942	Lost due to enemy action.
YR-43	In Gulf of Alaska, off Zaikof Point on Montague Island	28 March 1945	Broke loose from US Army tug LT-373. All crewmembers rescued.
YRC-4	Philippines	1942	Lost due to enemy action.
YSR-2	Philippines	22 February 1942	Sunk by Japanese.

== Coast Guard cutters ==
Name	Location	Date	Cause
CG-58012	41°53′N 70°30′W; Off Plymouth, Massachusetts	2 May 1943	Fire
CG-74327	Off Portsmouth, New Hampshire	19 November 1944	Sunk by collision with submarine USS Thornback (SS-418).
CG-83301	Off Okinawa	9 October 1945	Sunk by Typhoon Louise.
CG-83415	Off Normandy, France	21 June 1944	Lost in a storm.
CG-83421	26°14′N 79°05′W	30 June 1943	Collision with SC-1330.
CG-83477	Off Normandy, France	21 June 1944	Lost in a storm.
CG-85006 (ex-Catamount #229192)	Off Ambrose Light, New York	27 March 1943	Explosion of unknown cause.
Acacia (WAGL-200)	Caribbean Sea	15 March 1942	Shelled and sunk by German submarine U-161
Alexander Hamilton (WPG-34)	Off Iceland	29 January 1942	Torpedoed by U-132
Bedloe (WSC-128)	Off Cape Hatteras	14 September 1944	Foundered in hurricane
Bodega (WYP-342)	Off Cristobal, Panama, Gulf of Mexico	20 December 1943	Stranded during a rescue attempt
Dow (WYP-353)	Caribbean Sea	14 October 1943	Foundered in gale, near Puerto Rico.
Escanaba (WPG-77)	60°50′N 52°00′W	13 June 1943	Sunk by torpedo or mine off Greenland.
Jackson (WPC-142)	Off Cape Hatteras	14 September 1944	Foundered in hurricane.
Magnolia (WAGL-231)	Entrance to Mobile Bay	24 August 1945	Rammed by SS Marguerite Lehand and sunk.
Muskeget (WAG-48)	In North Atlantic Ocean	9 September 1942	Sunk by U-755. 121 killed.
Natsek (WYP-170)	Strait of Belle Isle, Newfoundland	Lost after 17 December 1942	Unknown: Probably capsized due to icing in a gale.
Vineyard (LV-73)	Vineyard Sound, Massachusetts	14 September 1944	Foundered in hurricane.
Wilcox (WYP-333)	Off Cape Hatteras	30 September 1943	Foundered in gale.

Four, possibly five, Coast Guard cutters were lost due to enemy action, all others were lost in accidents.

== U.S. Army ships ==
Name	Location	Date	Cause
USAT Crown Reefer	Off Kirilof Point (51°25′15″N 179°17′50″E) on the coast of Amchitka Island in the Aleutian Islands.	27 January 1946	Ran aground and abandoned.
USAT Edwin C. Eckel	Western Pacific Ocean.	11 November 1946	Concrete hulled cargo ship. Damaged in Typhoon Betty and declared a constructive total loss. Scuttled by U.S. Army in January 1947.
USAT Portmar	Southeast of Coff's Harbor off Smoky Cape, New South Wales, Australia.	16 June 1943	Torpedoed by Japanese submarine I-174.
USAT Brigadier General M. G. Zalinski	Pitt Island, Grenville Channel, southwest of James Point, British Columbia	29 September 1946	Ran aground and sank.
FS-163	Southwest Pacific Area.	12 October 1945	Foundered in a typhoon. Crewed by Coast Guard.
FS-172	Off Mugil Point, Cape Croisilles, New Guinea	July 1946.	Sunk after grounding on rocks. Crewed by Coast Guard.
FS-255	Talomo Bay, Davao Gulf, Mindanao, Philippines	11 May 1945	Struck by torpedo. Crewed by Coast Guard. 4 killed.
FS-290	Off Okinawa, Ryukyu Islands.	9 October 1945	Sunk by Typhoon Louise. Crewed by Coast Guard.
FS-406	Naha, Okinawa, Ryukyu Islands	8 October 1945	Wrecked by Typhoon Louise. Crewed by Coast Guard.
LT-358	Off Okinawa, Ryukyu Islands.	8 October 1945	Sunk by Typhoon Louise. Crewed by Coast Guard.

== U.S. Coast and Geodetic Survey ==
Name	Location	Date	Cause
USCGSS Research	Manila Bay, Philippines	30 January 1942	Formerly named Pathfinder. Damaged by bomb and beached.

== See also ==
- List of ships of the United States Navy
- List of U.S. Navy ships sunk or damaged in action during World War II - a similar list but with more ships and in narrative form
