= USS SC-696 =

US WWII submarine chaser

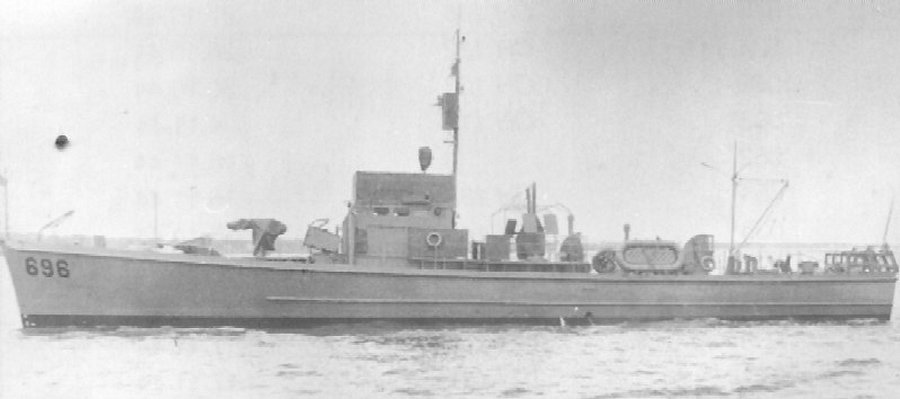
- The SC-696 two days before her commissioning.

History

United States
- Name: SC-696
- Ordered: 16 February 1942
- Builder: Daytona Beach Boat Works Inc.
- Laid down: 26 March 1942
- Launched: 6 August 1942
- Commissioned: 25 November 1942
- In service: 1942
- Out of service: 1943
- Fate: Sunk by German Aircraft, 23 August 1943

General characteristics
- Displacement: 148 tons
- Length: 110 feet, 10 inches
- Beam: 17 feet
- Draft: 6 feet, 6 inches
- Propulsion: 2 x General Motors 8-268A diesel engines or 2 x General Motors 16-184A diesel "pancake" engines, two screws.
- Speed: 15.6 knots
- Range: 1,500 nautical miles at 12 knots
- Armament: One 40mm mount; two .50 Caliber Machine Guns; two "Y" Gun Depth Charges

USS SC-696 was an SC-497-Class Submarine chaser of the United States Navy during World War II. She was sunk on 23 August 1943 by German dive bombers.

== Ship History ==
She was ordered on 16 February 1942, laid down at Daytona Beach, Florida on 26 March 1942 by Daytona Beach Boat Works Inc. and launched on 6 August 1942. On 25 November 1942 she was commissioned as USS PC-696. In April, she was re-designated as USS SC-696. On 23 August 1943, off Palermo, Italy, SC-696 and USS SC-694 came under attack by Junkers Ju 88 dive bombers. Both were sunk. 18 men were killed aboard the 696.

=== Decorations ===
SC-696 received one battle star for her service.

- European-African-Middle Eastern Campaign Medal
- American Campaign Medal
