= USS LST-563 =

Tank landing ship of the United States Navy during World War II

Coordinates: 10°18′26.69″N 109°14′5.66″W

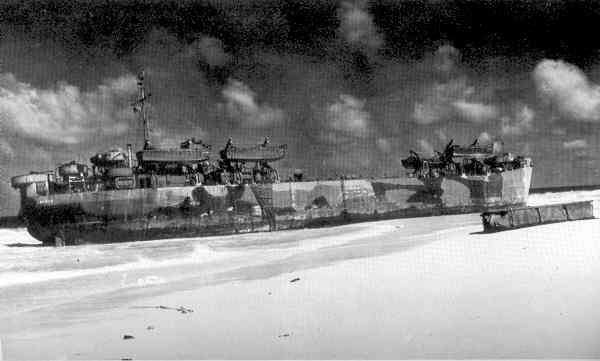
- LST-563 broached on Clipperton Island, 22 December 1944

History

United States
- Name: USS LST-563
- Builder: Missouri Valley Bridge and Iron Company, Evansville, Indiana
- Laid down: 4 March 1944
- Launched: 1 May 1944
- Sponsored by: Mrs. N. E. Senescall
- Commissioned: 20 May 1944
- Stricken: 9 February 1945
- Fate: Wrecked 21 December 1944

General characteristics
- Class & type: LST-542-class tank landing ship
- Displacement: 1,625 long tons (1,651 t) light; 4,080 long tons (4,145 t) full
- Length: 328 ft (100 m)
- Beam: 50 ft (15 m)
- Draft: Unloaded : 2 ft 4 in (0.71 m) forward; 7 ft 6 in (2.29 m) aft; Loaded : 8 ft 2 in (2.49 m) forward; 14 ft 1 in (4.29 m) aft
- Propulsion: 2 × General Motors 12-567 diesel engines, two shafts, twin rudders
- Speed: 12 knots (22 km/h; 14 mph)
- Boats & landing craft carried: 2 or 6 LCVPs
- Troops: 14–16 officers, 131–147 enlisted men
- Complement: 7–9 officers, 104–120 enlisted men
- Armament: 8 × 40 mm guns; 12 × 20 mm guns

USS LST-563 was an LST-542-class tank landing ship built for the United States Navy during World War II. She was in commission during 1944.

== Construction and commissioning ==
LST-563 was laid down on 4 March 1944 at Evansville, Indiana, by the Missouri Valley Bridge and Iron Company. She was launched on 1 May 1944, sponsored by Mrs. N. E. Senescall, and commissioned on 20 May 1944.

== Service history ==
During World War II, LST-563 was grounded on Clipperton Island in the eastern Pacific Ocean, 670 nautical miles (1,241 kilometers) southwest of Mexico, on 21 December 1944 and suffered extensive damage. After numerous unsuccessful attempts to free her, LST-563 was stripped and abandoned on 9 February 1945. She was struck from the Naval Vessel Register on 23 February 1945.

== See also ==
- List of United States Navy LSTs
- List of United States Navy losses in World War II
