= USS LCT-242 =

US Landing tank (1942-1943)

History

United States
- Name: USS LCT-242
- Builder: Pidgeon-Thomas Iron Works; Memphis, Tennessee
- Laid down: September 1942
- Launched: September 1942
- Completed: September 1942
- Commissioned: September 1942
- Fate: Sunk by torpedo off Naples

General characteristics
- Class & type: LCT (Mark V)
- Displacement: 286 short tons
- Length: 114 ft 2 in (34.80 m)
- Beam: 32 ft 8 in (9.96 m)
- Draft: 3 ft (0.9 m)
- Propulsion: 3 × Grey Marine Diesels, 3 propellers, 675 shp/shaft
- Speed: 10 knots (19 km/h)
- Range: 700 nmi @ 7 knots; (1,300 km @ 13 km/h)
- Capacity: Cargo, 150 short tons
- Complement: 13
- Armament: 1 × 20 mm AA guns; 2 × M2 Browning machine guns
- Armor: 2.5 inches (6.4 cm), wheelhouse; 2 inches (5.1 cm), gun shield

USS LCT-242 was a Landing Craft Tank, Mark V landing craft built for the United States Navy in World War II. Like most of the ships of her type, she was not named and known only by her designation.

LCT-242 was built at Pidgeon-Thomas Iron Works in Memphis, Tennessee and delivered in September 1942.

She was assigned to the European Theatre as a part of LCT Flotilla 10 in the Mediterranean.

On 2 December 1943, a circling torpedo impacted and sank LCT-242 off Naples.
