= USS LST-6 =

LST-1-class tank landing ship

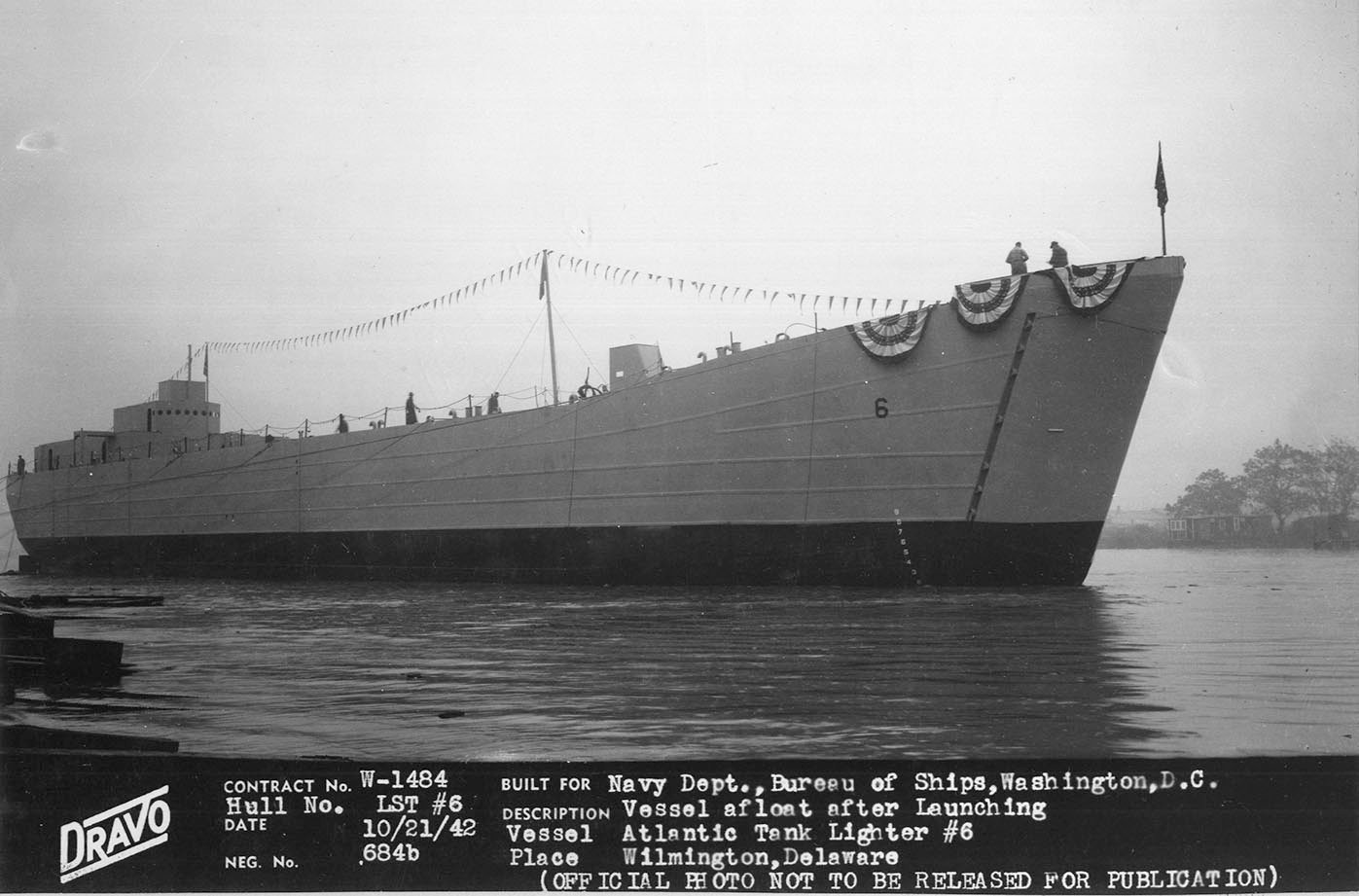
- LST-6 after launching, 21 October 1942, at Dravo Corporation, Wilmington, Delaware

History

United States
- Name: USS LST-6
- Builder: Dravo Corporation, Wilmington, Delaware
- Laid down: 20 July 1942
- Launched: 21 October 1942
- Sponsored by: Mrs. H.E. Haven
- Commissioned: 30 January 1943
- Stricken: 22 December 1944
- Honors and awards: 3 battle stars (WWII)
- Fate: Mined and sunk 17 November 1944

General characteristics
- Class & type: LST-1-class tank landing ship
- Displacement: 1,625 long tons (1,651 t) light; 4,080 long tons (4,145 t) full
- Length: 328 ft (100 m)
- Beam: 50 ft (15 m)
- Draft: Varied, depending on load
- Speed: 12 knots (22 km/h; 14 mph)
- Boats & landing craft carried: 6 LCVP
- Capacity: between 1600 and 1900 tons
- Troops: 14 officers, 131 enlisted men
- Complement: 129 officers and enlisted men
- Armament: 2 × twin 40 mm gun mounts w/Mk.51 directors; 4 × single 40 mm gun mounts; 12 × single 20 mm gun mounts

USS LST-6 was an LST-1-class tank landing ship of the United States Navy. LST-6 served in the European Theater of Operations, participating in the Allied invasion of Sicily, the Salerno Landings, and the Normandy landings. She hit a mine in the English Channel on 17 November 1944 and sank in six fathoms (36 feet) of water the same day.

== Construction ==
LST-6 was laid down on 20 July 1942 at Dravo Corporation in Wilmington, Delaware, launched on 21 October 1942, sponsored by Mrs. H. E. Haven; and commissioned on 30 January 1943.

== Service history ==
LST-6 was assigned to the European Theatre and participated in the following operations, for which she received three battle stars:

- Sicilian Occupation – 9–15 July 1943
- Salerno landings – 9–21 September 1943
- Invasion of Normandy – 6–25 June 1944

LST-6 participated in the landings at Omaha Beach as part of Assault Group O3. In August 1944, Lieutenant W.H. Weddle took command. LST-6 struck a mine and sank in the English Channel while returning from a supply movement from Portland to Rouen on 17 November 1944. She was struck from the Navy List on 22 December 1944.
