= USS LCT-777 =

U.S. Landing Craft Tank

History

United States
- Name: LCT-777
- In service: January 1944
- Out of service: 1944
- Fate: Sunk, 6 June 1944

General characteristics
- Speed: 10 knots (19 km/h; 12 mph)
- Complement: 1 officer, 13 enlisted
- Armament: two single 20 mm AA guns; four .50-caliber machine guns

USS LCT-777 was a Mark 6 Landing Craft Tank of the United States Navy during World War II.

== History ==
Built in 1943 at Mount Vernon, Ohio, LCT-777 was delivered to the US Navy in January 1944. She was then assigned to LCT Flotilla Seventeen, LCT Group 50.

LCT-777 took part in the Invasion of Normandy, where she struck a mine about 500 yards (460 m) off Omaha Beach and sunk stern-first. on 6 June 1944

As a result of the explosion, five sailors were killed, and another six were badly wounded. Four tanks were sunk with her. She was stricken from the Naval Register on 27 November 1944.

=== Awards ===
- Combat Action Ribbon
- American Campaign Medal
- European-African-Middle Eastern Campaign Medal with one battle star
- World War II Victory Medal
