= USS LST-568 =

1944 LST-542-class tank landing ship

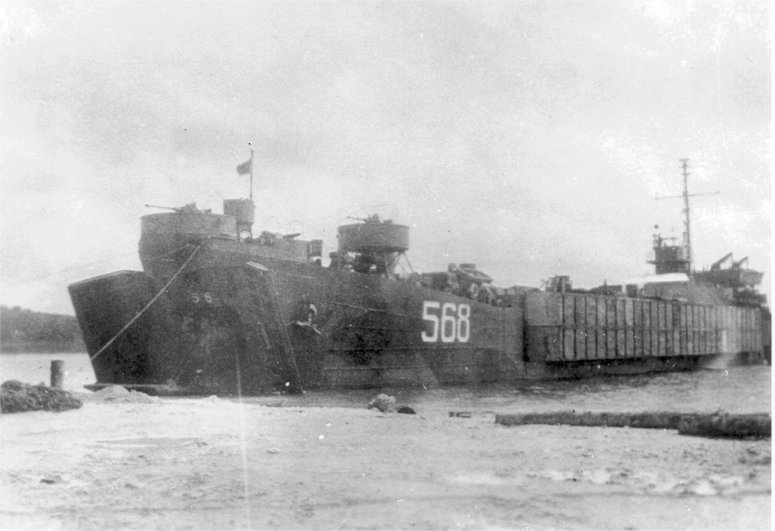
- USS LST-568 on the beach in the Russell Islands in the Solomon Islands on 10 August 1945

History

United States
- Name: USS LST-568
- Builder: Missouri Valley Bridge and Iron Company, Evansville, Indiana
- Laid down: 21 March 1944
- Launched: 18 May 1944
- Sponsored by: Mrs. Arthur E. Owen
- Commissioned: 3 June 1944
- Decommissioned: 4 March 1946
- Stricken: 20 March 1946
- Honors and awards: Four battle stars for World War II
- Fate: Scuttled 7 March 1946

General characteristics
- Class & type: LST-542-class tank landing ship
- Displacement: 1,625 long tons (1,651 t) light; 4,080 long tons (4,145 t) full (seagoing draft with 1,675-ton load
- Length: 328 ft (100 m)
- Beam: 50 ft (15 m)
- Draft: Unloaded 2 ft 4 in (0.71 m) forward; 7 ft 6 in (2.29 m) aft; Full load: 8 ft 2 in (2.49 m) forward; 14 ft 1 in (4.29 m) aft; Landing with 500-ton load: 3 ft 11 in (1.19 m) forward; 9 ft 10 in (3.00 m) aft
- Installed power: 1,800 horsepower (1.34 megawatts)
- Propulsion: Two 900-horsepower (0.67-megawatt) General Motors 12-567 diesel engines, two shafts, twin rudders
- Speed: 12 knots (22 km/h)
- Range: 24,000 nautical miles (44,000 km) at 9 knots (17 km/h) while displacing 3,960 tons
- Boats & landing craft carried: 2 x LCVPs
- Capacity: 1,600-1,900 tons cargo depending on mission
- Troops: 16 officers, 147 enlisted men
- Complement: 7 officers, 104 enlisted men
- Armament: 2 × twin 40 mm gun mounts; 4 × single 40-millimeter gun mounts; 12 × 20 mm guns

USS LST-568 was a United States Navy LST-542-class tank landing ship in commission from 1944 to 1946.

== Construction and commissioning ==
LST-568 was laid down on 21 March 1944 at Evansville, Indiana, by the Missouri Valley Bridge and Iron Company. She was launched on 18 May 1944, sponsored by Mrs. Arthur E. Owen, and commissioned on 3 June 1944.

== Service history ==
During World War II, LST-568 was assigned to the Pacific Theater of Operations. She took part in the Philippines campaign, participating in the landings on Leyte in October 1944 and the landings at Lingayen Gulf in January 1945. She then took part in the invasion and occupation of Okinawa Gunto in April 1945.

Following the war, LST-568 performed occupation duty in the Far East. She was caught in a typhoon off Ulithi Atoll on 15 September 1945, during which winds reached 120 knots (220 km/h); near the eye of the storm, LST-568 was badly damaged, losing her bow doors and suffering flooding.

While moored to a buoy at Buckner Bay, Okinawa, on 9 October 1945, LST-568 was caught in a second typhoon, during which winds reached 109 knots (202 kilometers per hour). The crew beached the ship to ride out the storm, but the wind blew the ship into the bay where it struck the Liberty ship SS Richard S. Oglesby. LST-568's crew abandoned ship and boarded Richard S. Oglesby. Shortly afterwards, the wind shifted and pushed the unmanned LST-568 across Buckner Bay. She eventually came to rest on the reef near China Saki Point, where she was found on 10 October 1945, extensively damaged.

Landing ship tank USS LST-693 pulled LST-568 off the reef on 13 October 1945. LST-568 departed for the Philippines on 18 October 1945 under tow by LST-693. The tow line parted after only a few miles, and the ship continued under its own power, with a maximum speed of about six knots. It arrived in the Philippines on 23 October 1945.

Orders arrived on 22 January 1946 to strip, decommission, and sink LST-568. Stripping completed, she was decommissioned in the Philippines on 4 March 1946, her last commanding officer, James L. La Fon, being the last man to leave the ship.

LST-568 was towed to sea east of Samar and sunk by internal explosive devices on 7 March 1946. She sank in 4,000 fathoms (24,000 feet or 7,315 meters) of water. She was stricken from the Navy List on 20 March 1946.

== Honors and awards ==
LST-568 earned four battle stars for her World War II service.
