= USS LST-167 =

U.S Coast Guard ship in WW2

History

United States
- Name: USS LST-167
- Builder: Missouri Valley Bridge and Iron; Evansville, Indiana
- Laid down: 19 September 1942
- Launched: 25 February 1943
- Commissioned: 27 April 1943
- Stricken: 6 December 1943
- Honours and awards: 1 Navy Unit Commendation; 1 battle stars (WWII)
- Fate: Destroyed in Action, 25 September 1943

General characteristics
- Class & type: Landing Ship, Tank
- Displacement: 1625 tons light; 4080 tons full; (full load = 2100 tons)
- Length: 327 ft 9 in (99.90 m)
- Beam: 50 ft (15 m)
- Draft: Unloaded: Bow: 1 ft 6 in (0.46 m); Stern: 7 ft 5 in (2.26 m); Loaded : Bow: 8 ft 2 in (2.49 m); Stern: 14 ft 1 in (4.29 m)
- Propulsion: 2 General Motors 12-567 diesel engines; two shafts, twin rudders
- Speed: 11.6 knots (21.5 km/h; 13.3 mph)
- Range: 24000 nm @ 9 knots
- Troops: 163
- Complement: 111
- Armament: 7 × 40 mm (single mount); 6 × 20 mm (single mount); 2 × .50 cal (12.7 mm) machine guns; 4 × .30 cal (7.62 mm) machine guns

USS LST-167 was a ship of the class Landing Ship, Tank in the service of the United States Coast Guard during World War II. The ship was built in Evansville, Indiana by the Missouri Valley Bridge and Iron Company and was commissioned 27 April 1943. She was placed under the command of LT Edward C. Simons, USCG.

== World War II Contribution ==
LST-167 participated in the advances of Operation Cartwheel in the Solomon Islands after the success of the Guadalcanal Campaign in February 1943.

Beginning on 15 August 1943, LST-167 supported the landing for the taking of Vella Lavella.

On 25 September 1943, while beached at the previously unused Ruravai Beach, she was struck by 2 enemy bombs and destroyed by ensuing fires and explosions. After being towed to Rendova, the ship was evaluated and declared economically unsalvageable.

In addition to 1 officer and 19 enlisted men wounded, 2 officers and 8 enlisted men were killed as a result of the attack. 5 others were missing in action. The destruction of LST-167 caused the greatest loss of life aboard a Coast Guard vessel during World War II.
