= USS SC-632 =

American submarine chaser

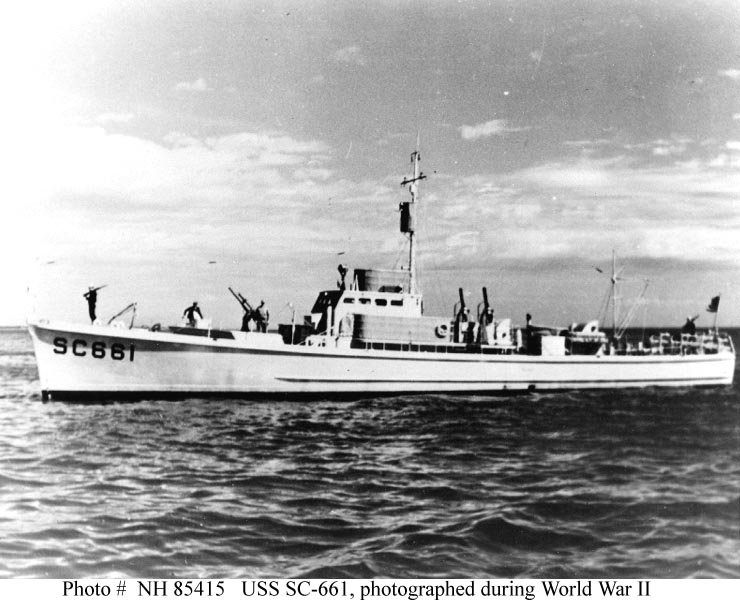
- USS SC-661, a fellow SC-497 class submarine chaser.

History

United States
- Laid down: 23 February 1942
- Launched: 25 June 1942
- Commissioned: 2 September 1942
- Fate: Foundered off the coast of Okinawa on 16 September 1945, hulk destroyed on 9 March 1948.

General characteristics
- Displacement: 148 tons
- Length: 110 ft 10 in (34 m)
- Beam: 17 ft (5 m)
- Draft: 6 ft 6 in (2 m)
- Propulsion: 2 × 1,540bhp General Motors 16-184A diesel engines; 2 × shafts.
- Speed: 21 knots
- Complement: 28
- Armament: 1 × 40 mm gun mount; 2 × .50 cal (12.7 mm) machine guns; 2 × DCP Y guns; 2 × DCT

USS SC-632 was a SC-497 class submarine chaser that served in the United States Navy during World War II. She was laid down on 23 February 1942 by the Mathis Yacht Building Co. in Camden, New Jersey and launched on 25 June 1942. She was commissioned on 2 September 1942. She foundered on 16 September 1945 off the coast of Okinawa. Her hulk was destroyed on 9 March 1948.
