= USS YP-88 =

History
- Name: YP-88 (ex-Adventure)
- Laid down: 1937
- Completed: 1937
- Honours and awards: American Campaign Medal; Asiatic–Pacific Campaign Medal; World War II Victory Medal
- Fate: Sunk by grounding, 28 October 1943

General characteristics
- Type: Patrol boat
- Displacement: 130 gross register tons
- Length: 75 ft (23 m) o/a
- Beam: 20.5 ft (6.2 m)
- Draught: 9.5 ft (2.9 m)
- Installed power: 200 shp
- Propulsion: one Diesel engine; single screw

USS YP-88 was a converted fishing vessel that served as an auxiliary patrol boat in the U.S. Navy during World War II.

== History ==
She was laid down and completed in 1937; and named Adventure. In 1941, she was acquired by the U.S. Navy, designated as a Yard Patrol Craft (YP), and assigned to the 13th Naval District. She was one of the initial ships assigned to the Ralph C. Parker's Alaskan Sector of the 13th Naval District colloquially known as the "Alaskan Navy".

On 28 October 1943, she was grounded at Amchitka, Aleutian Islands and was struck from the Naval List.
