= USS LST-158 =

1944 LST-1-class tank landing ship

History

United States
- Name: USS LST-158
- Builder: Missouri Valley Bridge &, Iron Co.; Evansville, Indiana
- Laid down: 11 July 1942
- Commissioned: 16 November 1942
- Stricken: 28 July 1943
- Honors and awards: 1 battle star for World War II service
- Fate: Sunk off Gela, Sicily, during Operation Husky,11 July 1943

General characteristics
- Class & type: LST-1-class tank landing ship
- Displacement: 1,625 t.(lt); 4,080 t.(fl) (sea-going draft w/1675 ton load)
- Length: 328 ft (100 m)
- Beam: 50 ft (15 m)
- Draft: fwd × aft; 2 ft 4 in (0.71 m) × 7 ft 6 in (2.29 m) (light); 8 feet 3 inches (2.51 m) × 14 feet 1 inch (4.29 m) (sea-going); 3 feet 11 inches (1.19 m) × 9 feet 10 inches (3.00 m) (landing w/500 ton load)
- Propulsion: 2 × General Motors 12-567, 900hp diesel engines, two shafts, twin rudders
- Speed: 12 kn (22 km/h) (maximum)
- Endurance: 24,000 miles @ 9 kn, disp. 3960 t; (44,000 km @ 17 km/h)
- Boats & landing craft carried: 2 × LCVP
- Capacity: Typical load: 1 LCT, tanks, wheeled and tracked vehicles, artillery, construction equipment and military supplies. A ramp or elevator forward allowed vehicles access to tank deck from main deck
- Troops: 16 officers, 147 enlisted
- Complement: 7 officers, 104 enlisted
- Armament: Typical: 2 × twin 40 mm AA guns w/Mk. 51 directors; 4 × single 40 mm AA guns; 12 × single 20 mm AA guns

USS LST-158 was an LST-1-class tank landing ship built for the United States Navy in World War II. Like most of the ships of her class, she was not named and known only by her designation.

LST-158 was laid down on 11 July 1942 at Evansville, Indiana, by the Missouri Valley Bridge &, Iron Co.; launched on 16 November 1942; and commissioned on 10 February 1943.

During World War II, LST-158 was assigned to the European Theatre. After Operations in the North African campaign, LST-158 was assigned to Allied invasion of Sicily. Embarking elements of the 66th Armor Regiment at Bizerte, she arrived off Gela, Sicily on 10 July 1943.

III.Gruppe of Schnellkampfgeschwader 10, a Focke-Wulf Fw 190 unit, surprised the Americans at anchor. A bomb hit LST-158 and started a fire. LST-158 smoked badly before exploding. The bomb hit an F Company ammunition truck, and three tanks, the T-2 recovery vehicle, and several other vehicles were lost; one officer was killed, and two soldiers were later reported missing in action. Fortunately, the company's other fourteen tanks were already ashore.

LST-158 was stricken from the register on July 28, 1943. Her remains were eventually scrapped.
