= USS LST-493 =

WWII US tank landing ship

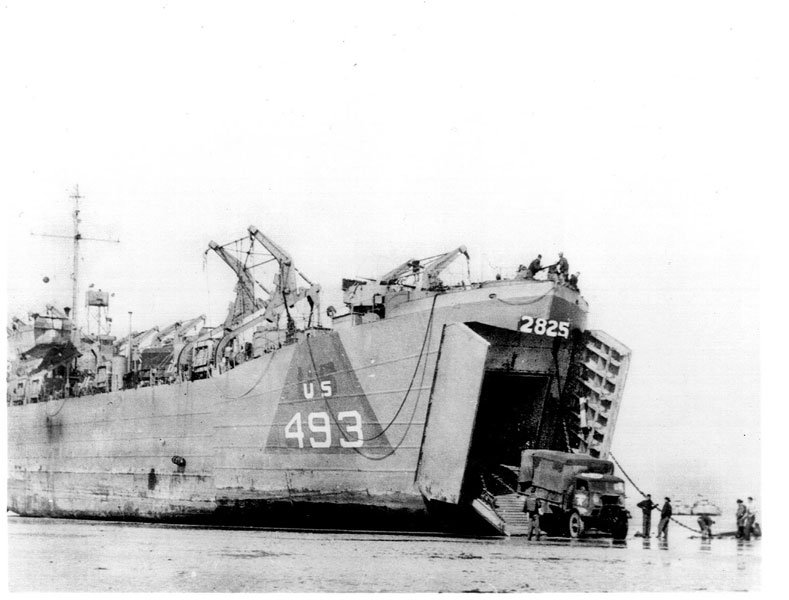
- USS LST-493 off loading at Normandy, c. 7 June 1944 to 9 April 1945.

History

United States
- Name: LST-493
- Builder: Missouri Valley Bridge & Iron Company, Evansville, Indiana
- Yard number: 48
- Laid down: 9 August 1943
- Launched: 4 October 1943
- Commissioned: 13 December 1943
- Decommissioned: 19 May 1945
- Stricken: 19 May 1945
- Identification: Hull symbol: LST-493; Code letters: NPDD
- Honors and awards: 1 × battle star (WWII)
- Fate: Grounded at Plymouth, United Kingdom, 12 April 1945

General characteristics
- Class & type: LST-491-class tank landing ship
- Displacement: 1,625 long tons (1,651 t) (light); 4,080 long tons (4,145 t) (full (seagoing draft with 1,675 short tons (1,520 t) load); 2,366 long tons (2,404 t) (beaching)
- Length: 328 ft (100 m) oa
- Beam: 50 ft (15 m)
- Draft: Unloaded: 2 ft 4 in (0.71 m) forward; 7 ft 6 in (2.29 m) aft; Full load: 8 ft 3 in (2.51 m) forward; 14 ft 1 in (4.29 m) aft; Landing with 500 short tons (450 t) load: 3 ft 11 in (1.19 m) forward; 9 ft 10 in (3.00 m) aft
- Installed power: 2 × 900 hp (670 kW) Electro-Motive Diesel 12-567A diesel engines; 1,700 shp (1,300 kW)
- Propulsion: 1 × Falk main reduction gears; 2 × Propellers
- Speed: 12 kn (22 km/h; 14 mph)
- Range: 24,000 nmi (44,000 km; 28,000 mi) at 9 kn (17 km/h; 10 mph) while displacing 3,960 long tons (4,024 t)
- Boats & landing craft carried: 6 x LCVPs
- Capacity: 1,600–1,900 short tons (3,200,000–3,800,000 lb; 1,500,000–1,700,000 kg) cargo depending on mission
- Troops: 16 officers, 147 enlisted men
- Complement: 13 officers, 104 enlisted men
- Armament: Varied, ultimate armament; 2 × twin 40 mm (1.57 in) Bofors guns; 4 × single 40 mm Bofors guns; 12 × 20 mm (0.79 in) Oerlikon cannons

USS LST-493 was an LST-491-class tank landing ship built for the United States Navy during World War II. Like many of her class, she was not named and is properly referred to by her hull designation.

== Construction and commissioning ==
LST-493 was laid down on 9 August 1943, at Evansville, Indiana, by the Missouri Valley Bridge & Iron Company; launched on 4 October 1943; sponsored by Mrs. Charles M. Hoagland; and commissioned on 13 December 1943.

== Service history ==
During World War II, LST-493 was assigned to the European Theater and participated in the Invasion of Normandy in June 1944. She grounded while attempting to enter Plymouth Harbor, England, on 12 April 1945, and was broken up and destroyed. The ship was struck from the Navy list on 19 May 1945.

== Honors and awards ==
LST-493 earned one battle star for World War II service.

== Bibliography ==
- "USS LST-493". NavSource. 28 November 2014.
- "MISSOURI VALLEY BRIDGE Evansville IN". www.ShipbuildingHistory.com. 7 August 2021.
- "'LST-493'". Dictionary of American Naval Fighting Ships. Navy Department, Naval History and Heritage Command. This article incorporates text from this source, which is in the public domain.

== See also ==
- List of United States Navy LSTs
