= USS LST-921 =

1944 LST-542-class tank landing ship

History

United States
- Name: LST-921
- Builder: Bethlehem-Hingham Shipyard, Hingham, Massachusetts
- Yard number: 3391
- Laid down: 1 May 1944
- Launched: 2 June 1944
- Commissioned: 23 June 1944
- Decommissioned: 29 September 1944
- Stricken: 14 October 1944
- Identification: Hull symbol: LST-921; Code letters: NKAC
- Fate: Lost in action, 14 August 1944; Towed to port and stripped

General characteristics
- Class & type: LST-542-class tank landing ship
- Displacement: 1,625 long tons (1,651 t) (light); 4,080 long tons (4,145 t) (full (seagoing draft with 1,675 short tons (1,520 t) load); 2,366 long tons (2,404 t) (beaching)
- Length: 328 ft (100 m) oa
- Beam: 50 ft (15 m)
- Draft: Unloaded: 2 ft 4 in (0.71 m) forward; 7 ft 6 in (2.29 m) aft; Full load: 8 ft 3 in (2.51 m) forward; 14 ft 1 in (4.29 m) aft; Landing with 500 short tons (450 t) load: 3 ft 11 in (1.19 m) forward; 9 ft 10 in (3.00 m) aft; Limiting 11 ft 2 in (3.40 m); Maximum navigation 14 ft 1 in (4.29 m)
- Installed power: 2 × 900 hp (670 kW) Electro-Motive Diesel 12-567A diesel engines; 1,800 shp (1,300 kW)
- Propulsion: 1 × Falk main reduction gears; 2 × Propellers
- Speed: 11.6 kn (21.5 km/h; 13.3 mph)
- Range: 24,000 nmi (44,000 km; 28,000 mi) at 9 kn (17 km/h; 10 mph) while displacing 3,960 long tons (4,024 t)
- Boats & landing craft carried: 2 x LCVPs
- Capacity: 1,600–1,900 short tons (3,200,000–3,800,000 lb; 1,500,000–1,700,000 kg) cargo depending on mission
- Troops: 16 officers, 147 enlisted men
- Complement: 13 officers, 104 enlisted men
- Armament: Varied, ultimate armament; 2 × twin 40 mm (1.57 in) Bofors guns; 4 × single 40 mm Bofors guns; 12 × 20 mm (0.79 in) Oerlikon cannons

Service record
- Awards: Combat Action Ribbon; American Campaign Medal; European–African–Middle Eastern Campaign Medal; World War II Victory Medal

USS LST-921 was an LST-542-class tank landing ship in the United States Navy. Like many of her class, she was not named and is properly referred to by her hull designation.

== Construction ==
LST-921 was laid down on 1 May 1944, at Hingham, Massachusetts, by the Bethlehem-Hingham Shipyard; launched on 2 June 1944; and commissioned on 23 June 1944.

== Service history ==
LST-921 was torpedoed by U-667 off the channel entrance to Bristol, England, on 14 August 1944, at 16:54, while sailing with convoy EBC 72. She was struck by one torpedo on her aft port side which broke the stern off. Two officers, along with 41 enlisted men, were lost, with the survivors being picked up by her sister ship LST-920 and the British Grimsby-class sloop Londonderry. The bow section was towed to port and stripped prior to decommissioning and disposal of the hulk. The ship was decommissioned on 29 September 1944, and struck from the Navy list on 14 October 1944. Her hulk was later used as a floating machine ship for the US Army in Antwerp, Belgium.

== Bibliography ==
Online resources

- "LST-921". Dictionary of American Naval Fighting Ships. Naval History and Heritage Command. This article incorporates text from this source, which is in the public domain.
- "Bethlehem-Hingham, Hingham MA". www.ShipbuildingHistory.com. 11 August 2011.
- "USS LST-921". NavSource. 26 September 2015.
- Helgason, Guðmundur. "USS LST-921". German U-boats of WWII - uboat.net.
