= USS Crow (AMc-20) =

Minesweeper of the United States Navy

History

United States
- Ordered: as Jardan
- Laid down: 1935
- Launched: not known
- In service: 4 February 1941
- Out of service: 23 August 1943
- Stricken: 8 April 1944
- Fate: Sunk during training session

General characteristics
- Displacement: 195 tons
- Length: 83 ft 2 in (25.35 m)
- Beam: 20 ft 11 in (6.38 m)
- Draught: 5 ft (1.5 m)
- Installed power: 300 HP
- Speed: 10 knots (19 km/h)
- Complement: 11
- Armament: one .30 cal machine gun

USS Crow (AMc-20) was a Crow-class coastal minesweeper acquired by the U.S. Navy for the dangerous task of removing mines from minefields laid in the water to prevent ships from passing.

== World War II service ==
The first ship to be named Crow by the Navy, she was in service attached to the 13th Naval District from 4 February 1941 to 23 August 1943 when she was sunk in Puget Sound by accident while acting as target towing ship for torpedo planes undergoing training.

== Deactivation ==
Crow was struck from the Navy List on 8 April 1944.
