= USS LST-448 =

United States Navy ship during World War II

History

United States
- Name: LST-448
- Ordered: as a Type S3-M-K2 hull, MCE hull 968
- Builder: Kaiser Shipbuilding Company, Vancouver, Washington
- Yard number: 152
- Laid down: 10 July 1942
- Launched: 26 September 1942
- Commissioned: 23 December 1942
- Identification: Hull symbol: LST-448
- Honors and awards: 2 × battle stars
- Fate: Sunk, 5 October 1943

General characteristics
- Class & type: LST-1-class tank landing ship
- Displacement: 4,080 long tons (4,145 t) full load; 2,160 long tons (2,190 t) landing
- Length: 328 ft (100 m) oa
- Beam: 50 ft (15 m)
- Draft: Full load: 8 ft 2 in (2.49 m) forward; 14 ft 1 in (4.29 m) aft; Landing at 2,160 t: 3 ft 11 in (1.19 m) forward; 9 ft 10 in (3.00 m) aft
- Installed power: 2 × 900 hp (670 kW) Electro-Motive Diesel 12-567A diesel engines; 1,700 shp (1,300 kW)
- Propulsion: 1 × Falk main reduction gears; 2 × Propellers
- Speed: 12 kn (22 km/h; 14 mph)
- Range: 24,000 nmi (44,000 km; 28,000 mi) at 9 kn (17 km/h; 10 mph) while displacing 3,960 long tons (4,024 t)
- Boats & landing craft carried: 2 or 6 x LCVPs
- Capacity: 2,100 tons oceangoing maximum; 350 tons main deckload
- Troops: 16 officers, 147 enlisted men
- Complement: 13 officers, 104 enlisted men
- Armament: Varied, ultimate armament; 2 × twin 40 mm (1.57 in) Bofors guns; 4 × single 40 mm Bofors guns; 12 × 20 mm (0.79 in) Oerlikon cannons

Service record
- Operations: Consolidation of the southern Solomons (June 1943); Vella Lavella occupation (October 1943)
- Awards: Combat Action Ribbon; Navy Unit Commendation; American Campaign Medal; Asiatic–Pacific Campaign Medal; World War II Victory Medal

USS LST-448 was a United States Navy LST-1-class tank landing ship used in the Asiatic-Pacific Theater during World War II.

== Construction ==
LST-448 was laid down on 10 July 1942, under Maritime Commission (MARCOM) contract, MC hull 968, by Kaiser Shipyards, Vancouver, Washington; launched on 26 September 1942; and commissioned on 23 December 1942.

== Service history ==
During the war, LST-448 was assigned to the Pacific Theater of Operations. She took part in the consolidation of the southern Solomons in June 1943, and the Vella Lavella occupation in October 1943.

The tank landing ship was damaged by Japanese dive bombers off Vella Lavella, Solomons, on 1 October, suffering some casualties among her embarked New Zealand troops. Fifteen members of an NZ anti aircraft crew were killed. The LST was taken under tow by tug Bobolink but sank while underway on 5 October, south of Vella Lavella. She was struck from the Navy list on 26 October 1943.

== Honors and awards ==
LST-448 earned two battle stars for her World War II service.

== Notes ==
Citations

== Bibliography ==
Online resources

- "LST-448". Dictionary of American Naval Fighting Ships. Naval History and Heritage Command. 3 August 2015. This article incorporates text from this source, which is in the public domain.
- "Kaiser Vancouver, Vancouver WA". www.ShipbuildingHistory.com. 27 November 2010.
- "USS LST-448". NavSource. 17 February 2006.
