= USS SC-694 =

Coordinates: 38°08′N 13°22′E

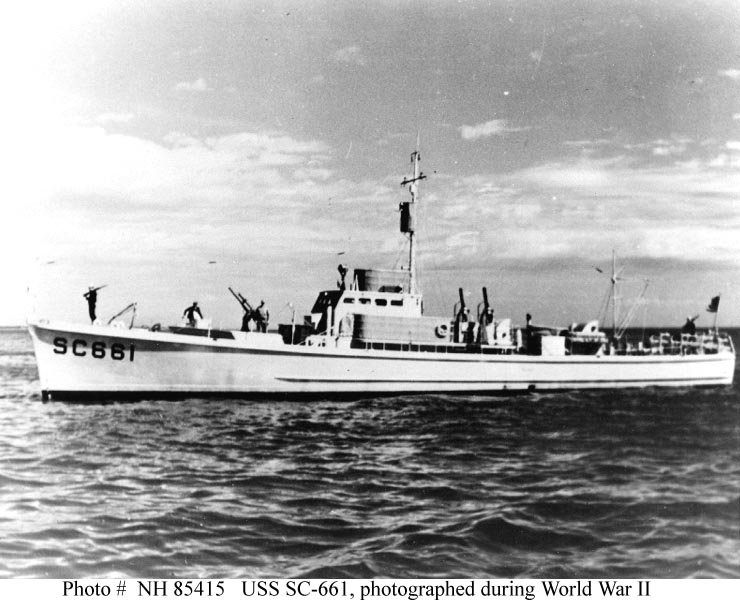
- USS SC-661, a fellow SC-497 class submarine chaser.

History

United States
- Name: USS SC-694
- Builder: Daytona Beach Boat Works, Inc.
- Laid down: 21 March 1942
- Launched: 25 May 1942
- Commissioned: 9 September 1942
- Fate: Bombed off the coast of Palermo, Sicily, on 23 August 1943.

General characteristics
- Class & type: SC-497 class submarine chaser
- Displacement: 148 tons
- Length: 110 ft 10 in (34 m)
- Beam: 17 ft (5 m)
- Draft: 6 ft 6 in (2 m)
- Propulsion: 2 × 1,540 hp General Motors diesel engines; 2 × shafts
- Speed: 21 knots
- Complement: 28
- Armament: 1 × 3 in (76 mm) gun mount; 2 × .50 cal (12.7 mm) machine guns; 2 × DCP Y guns; 2 × DCT

USS SC-694 was a SC-497 class submarine chaser that served in the United States Navy during World War II. She was laid down on 21 March 1942 by the Daytona Beach Boat Works in Daytona Beach, Florida, and launched on 25 May 1942. She was commissioned on 9 September 1942. She was bombed and sunk by German Ju 88 dive bombers off the coast of Palermo, Sicily, on 23 August 1943.
