= Wolfpack Pfadfinder =

- Active: 21 May 1942 – 27 May 1942
- Country: Nazi Germany
- Branch: Kriegsmarine
- Size: 8 submarines

Commanders
- Notable commanders: Otto von Bülow; Heinz-Otto Schultze

Pfadfinder (English: "Pathfinder") was a "wolfpack" of German U-boats that operated from 21 to 27 May 1942, in the Battle of the Atlantic during World War II. Operating off the North American coast between New England and Newfoundland they sank two ships for a total of 10,724 gross register tons (GRT).

== U-boats, commanders and dates ==
- U-135, Friedrich-Hermann Praetorius, 21–27 May
- U-213, Amelung von Varendorff, 21–27 May
- U-432, Heinz-Otto Schultze, 21–27 May
- U-455, Hans-Heinrich Giessler, 21–27 May
- U-566, Dietrich Borchert, 21–27 May
- U-578, Ernst-August Rehwinkel, 21–27 May
- U-653, Gerhard Feiler, 21–27 May
- U-404, Otto von Bülow, 23–27 May

== Ships hit by this Wolfpack ==
=== Zurichmoor ===
At 00:24 on 23 May, while en route from Halifax to Saint Thomas, U.S. Virgin Islands, the unescorted 4,455 GRT British merchant ship Zurichmoor was torpedoed and sunk by U-432 east of Philadelphia. The master, 38 crewmen, and six gunners were lost.

=== Polyphemus ===
At 00:18 hours on 27 May the unescorted 6,269 GRT Dutch merchantman Polyphemus, en route from Halifax to Liverpool, was hit by two torpedoes from U-578 about 340 nautical miles (630 km) north of Bermuda and sank within 45 minutes, with the loss of 15 of the crew. The survivors, including 14 men previously picked up from the Norland, sunk five days before by U-108, abandoned ship in five lifeboats. The U-boat surfaced and questioned the first officer before giving them cigarettes and the heading for New York. Three of the lifeboats landed at Nantucket Island, Massachusetts, while the other two were rescued by a Portuguese ship.
