= German submarine U-404 =

German World War II submarine

History

Nazi Germany
- Name: U-404
- Ordered: 23 September 1939
- Builder: Danziger Werft, Danzig
- Yard number: 105
- Laid down: 4 June 1940
- Launched: 4 June 1941
- Commissioned: 6 August 1941
- Fate: Sunk on 28 July 1943 by depth charges from two American and one British B-24 Liberators

General characteristics
- Class & type: Type VIIC submarine
- Displacement: 769 tonnes (757 long tons) surfaced; 871 t (857 long tons) submerged
- Length: 67.10 m (220 ft 2 in) o/a; 50.50 m (165 ft 8 in) pressure hull
- Beam: 6.20 m (20 ft 4 in) o/a; 4.70 m (15 ft 5 in) pressure hull
- Height: 9.60 m (31 ft 6 in)
- Draught: 4.74 m (15 ft 7 in)
- Installed power: 2,800–3,200 PS (2,100–2,400 kW; 2,800–3,200 bhp) (diesels); 750 PS (550 kW; 740 shp) (electric)
- Propulsion: 2 shafts; 2 × diesel engines; 2 × electric motors
- Speed: 17.7 knots (32.8 km/h; 20.4 mph) surfaced; 7.6 knots (14.1 km/h; 8.7 mph) submerged
- Range: 8,500 nmi (15,700 km; 9,800 mi) at 10 knots (19 km/h; 12 mph) surfaced; 80 nmi (150 km; 92 mi) at 4 knots (7.4 km/h; 4.6 mph) submerged
- Test depth: 230 m (750 ft); Crush depth: 250–295 m (820–968 ft)
- Complement: 4 officers, 40–56 enlisted
- Armament: 5 × 53.3 cm (21 in) torpedo tubes (four bow, one stern); 14 × torpedoes; 1 × 8.8 cm (3.46 in) deck gun (220 rounds); 1 x 2 cm (0.79 in) C/30 AA gun

Service record
- Part of: 6th U-boat Flotilla; 6 August 1941 – 28 July 1943
- Identification codes: M 03 340
- Commanders: K.Kapt. Otto von Bülow; 6 August 1941 – 19 July 1943; Oblt.z.S. Adolf Schönberg; 20 – 28 July 1943
- Operations: 7 patrols: 1st patrol: 17 January – 1 February 1942; 2nd patrol: 14 February – 4 April 1942; 3rd patrol: 6 May – 14 July 1942; 4th patrol: 23 August – 13 October 1942; 5th patrol: 21 December 1942 – 6 February 1943; 6th patrol: 21 March – 3 May 1943; 7th patrol: 24 – 28 July 1943
- Victories: 14 merchant ships sunk (71,450 GRT); 1 warship sunk (1,120 tons); 2 merchant ships damaged (16,689 GRT)

German submarine U-404 was a Type VIIC U-boat built for Nazi Germany's Kriegsmarine for service during World War II.

She was laid down at the Danziger Werft in the city of the same name on 4 June 1940 as yard number 105, launched a year later on 4 June 1941 and was commissioned on 6 August 1941, with Kapitänleutnant Otto von Bülow in command.

The boat commenced her career with the 6th U-boat Flotilla, a training organization on 6 August 1941, before moving on to operations on 1 October 1941. U-404 carried out seven combat patrols, sinking 14 merchantmen and one warship for a total of over 71,450 gross register tons (GRT) and 1,120 tons during the Second World War. She also damaged two other ships. The submarine was a member of 13 wolfpacks and was visually identifiable by the particular paint scheme consisting of a prow of a Viking longboat painted in red paint on either side of the conning tower.

For his numerous successes, von Bülow received the Knight's Cross.

== Design ==
German Type VIIC submarines were preceded by the shorter Type VIIB submarines. U-404 had a displacement of 769 tonnes (757 long tons) when at the surface and 871 tonnes (857 long tons) while submerged. She had a total length of 67.10 m (220 ft 2 in), a pressure hull length of 50.50 m (165 ft 8 in), a beam of 6.20 m (20 ft 4 in), a height of 9.60 m (31 ft 6 in), and a draught of 4.74 m (15 ft 7 in). The submarine was powered by two Germaniawerft F46 four-stroke, six-cylinder supercharged diesel engines producing a total of 2,800 to 3,200 metric horsepower (2,060 to 2,350 kW; 2,760 to 3,160 shp) for use while surfaced, two Siemens-Schuckert GU 343/38–8 double-acting electric motors producing a total of 750 metric horsepower (550 kW; 740 shp) for use while submerged. She had two shafts and two 1.23 m (4 ft) propellers. The boat was capable of operating at depths of up to 230 metres (750 ft).

The submarine had a maximum surface speed of 17.7 knots (32.8 km/h; 20.4 mph) and a maximum submerged speed of 7.6 knots (14.1 km/h; 8.7 mph). When submerged, the boat could operate for 80 nautical miles (150 km; 92 mi) at 4 knots (7.4 km/h; 4.6 mph); when surfaced, she could travel 8,500 nautical miles (15,700 km; 9,800 mi) at 10 knots (19 km/h; 12 mph). U-404 was fitted with five 53.3 cm (21 in) torpedo tubes (four fitted at the bow and one at the stern), fourteen torpedoes, one 8.8 cm (3.46 in) SK C/35 naval gun, 220 rounds, and a 2 cm (0.79 in) C/30 anti-aircraft gun. The boat had a complement of between forty-four and sixty.

== Service history ==
=== First and second patrols ===
No ships were sunk during her first patrol which lasted from 17 January to 1 February 1942. U-404 sailed from the German port of Kiel; the only excitement she encountered was when a periscope was damaged in an air attack. The submarine sailed into Lorient in France, after 16 otherwise uneventful days.

On her second patrol, when she departed Lorient on 14 February 1942, U-404 had more success, sinking three ships off the eastern American coast. One of them, Lemuel Burrows, was close enough to land when she was sunk that the second engineer, who survived, reported that "the lights of a New Jersey beach resort doomed his vessel and that they would continue [the German U-boats] to cause daily torpedoings until a blackout is ordered along the coast." This situation was repeated many times due to American unpreparedness so soon after that country's entry into the war. Another was the unescorted San Demetrio sailing from Baltimore, Maryland, bound for the UK via Halifax, Nova Scotia with a cargo of 4,000 tons of alcohol and 7,000 tons of aviation spirit. She was northwest of Cape Charles, Virginia when torpedoed by U-404 on 17 March. 16 crew and three DEMS gunners were lost and six crew wounded but survivors managed to launch two lifeboats. Two days later the US tanker Beta rescued the Master, 26 crew and five DEMS gunners and took them to Norfolk, Virginia. The Master of San Demetrio was awarded a Lloyd's War Medal.

U-404 returned to Brest, also in France, on 4 April 1942.

=== Third and fourth patrols ===
The achievements of her second patrol was repeated on her third, with the Operation Drumbeat submarine accounting for another four ships off the American coast in June 1942: The Yugoslavian Ljubica Matokovic on 24 June, Manuda (United States) and Nordal (Panama) on the 25th, and MS Moldanger (Norway) on the 27th. The sinking of Moldanger became headline news when some of the crew were rescued after surviving on two rafts until 14 August 1942. After this campaign U-404 returned to St. Nazaire.

For her fourth sortie, she left St. Nazaire on 23 August 1942 and returned on 13 October, having spent 52 days at sea and sinking three more ships, including the W-Class Destroyer HMS Veteran in mid-Atlantic.

=== Fifth and sixth patrols ===
It was a different story on her fifth patrol; she spent 44 fruitless days looking for targets, having departed St. Nazaire on 21 December 1942, returning on 6 February 1943.

Her sixth foray was better, she sank three ships, totaling 17,736 GRT.

On 25 April 1943, German radio erroneously broadcast that U-404 had torpedoed and sunk the aircraft carrier USS Ranger in the North Atlantic. No such sinking ever occurred; Ranger would survive the war and was sold for scrap in 1946.

=== Seventh patrol and loss ===
U-404 left St. Nazaire with a new commander on 24 July 1943. Four days later, she was sent to the bottom with all hands, at position 45°53′N 09°25′W, due to the efforts and depth charges of three Liberator aircraft, two American and one British. They did not emerge from the action unscathed; all three planes lost an engine due to the accurate anti-aircraft fire from the U-boat.

=== Wolfpacks ===
U-404 took part in 13 wolfpacks, namely:

- Schlei (21 – 24 January 1942)
- Hecht (8 – 11 May 1942)
- Pfadfinder (23 – 27 May 1942)
- Stier (29 August – 2 September 1942)
- Vorwärts (2 – 26 September 1942)
- Luchs (27 – 29 September 1942)
- Letzte Ritter (29 September – 1 October 1942)
- Falke (28 December 1942 – 19 January 1943)
- Landsknecht (19 – 28 January 1943)
- Without name (27 – 30 March 1943)
- Adler (7 – 13 April 1943)
- Meise (13 – 20 April 1943)
- Specht (21 – 25 April 1943)

== Summary of raiding history ==
Date	Ship Name	Nationality	Tonnage (Note: Merchant ship tonnages are in gross register tons. Military vessels are listed by tons displacement.)	Fate
5 March 1942	Collamer	United States	5,112	Sunk
13 March 1942	Tolten	Chile	1,858	Sunk
14 March 1942	Lemuel Burrows	United States	7,610	Sunk
17 March 1942	San Demetrio	United Kingdom	8,073	Sunk
30 May 1942	Aloca Shipper	United States	5,491	Sunk
1 June 1942	West Notus	United States	5,492	Sunk
3 June 1942	Anna	Sweden	1,345	Sunk
24 June 1942	Ljubica Matokovic	Yugoslavia	3,289	Sunk
25 June 1942	Manuda	United States	4,772	sunk
25 June 1942	Nordal	Panama	3,845	sunk
27 June 1942	Moldanger	Norway	6,827	Sunk
11 September 1942	Marit II	Norway	7,417	Damaged
12 September 1942	Daghild	Norway	9,272	Damaged
26 September 1942	HMS Veteran (D72)	Royal Navy	1,120	Sunk
29 March 1943	Nagara	United Kingdom	8,791	Sunk
30 March 1943	Empire Bowman	United Kingdom	7,031	Sunk
12 April 1943	Lancastrian Prince	United Kingdom	1,914	Sunk

== Bibliography ==
- Blair, Clay (1996). Hitler's U-Boat War – The Hunters 1939–1942. Random House. ISBN 0-394-58839-8.
- Blair, Clay (1998). Hitler's U-Boat War – The Hunted 1942–1945. Random House. ISBN 0-679-45742-9.
- Busch, Rainer; Röll, Hans-Joachim (1999). German U-boat commanders of World War II : a biographical dictionary. Translated by Brooks, Geoffrey. London, Annapolis, Md: Greenhill Books, Naval Institute Press. ISBN 1-55750-186-6.
- Busch, Rainer; Röll, Hans-Joachim (1999). Deutsche U-Boot-Verluste von September 1939 bis Mai 1945 [German U-boat losses from September 1939 to May 1945]. Der U-Boot-Krieg (in German). Vol. IV. Hamburg, Berlin, Bonn: Mittler. ISBN 3-8132-0514-2.
- Edwards, Bernard (1996). Dönitz and the Wolf Packs – The U-boats at War. Cassell Military Classics. pp. 104, 107, 109, 193, 202. ISBN 0-304-35203-9.
- Gröner, Erich; Jung, Dieter; Maass, Martin (1991). U-boats and Mine Warfare Vessels. German Warships 1815–1945. Vol. 2. Translated by Thomas, Keith; Magowan, Rachel. London: Conway Maritime Press. ISBN 0-85177-593-4.
- Kemp, Paul (1999). U-Boats Destroyed – German Submarine Losses in the World Wars. London: Arms & Armour. ISBN 1-85409-515-3.
- Lenton, H.T. (1976). German Warships of the Second World War. Arco Publishing Company. ISBN 0-668-04037-8.
- Waters, John M. Jr., CAPT USCG (December 1966). "Stay Tough". Proceedings. United States Naval Institute.
- Gannon, Michael (1990). Operation Drumbeat – the dramatic true story of Germany's first U-boat attacks along the American coast in World War II. Harper and Row. ISBN 0-06-016155-8.
