= USS Ranger (CV-4) =

Ranger-class aircraft carrier

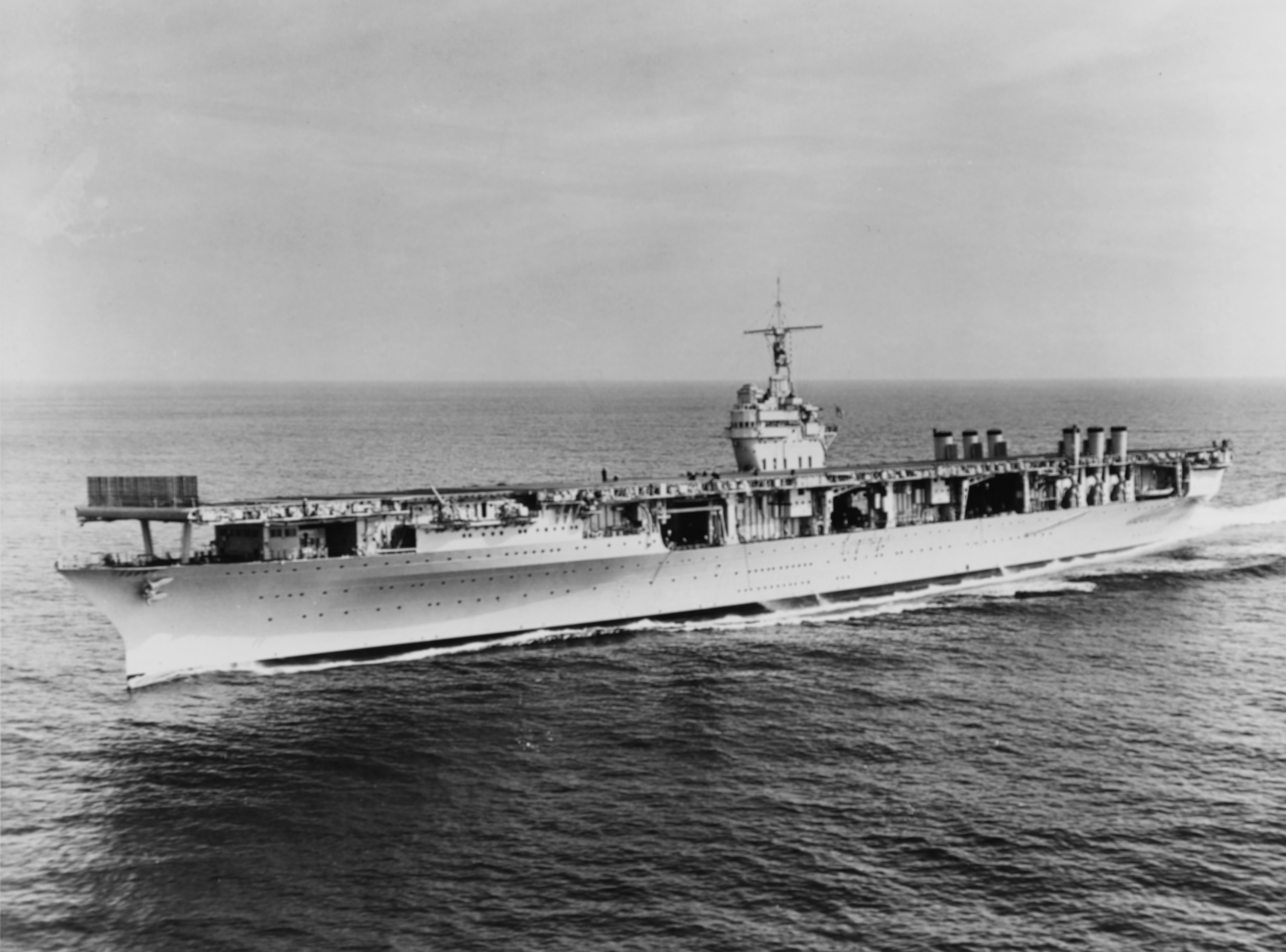
- USS Ranger underway at sea, 1930s

Class overview
- Operators: United States Navy
- Preceded by: Lexington class
- Succeeded by: Yorktown class
- Built: 1931–1934
- In commission: 1934–1946
- Completed: 1
- Scrapped: 1

History

United States
- Name: USS Ranger
- Ordered: 1 November 1930
- Builder: Newport News Shipbuilding & Drydock Co.
- Laid down: 26 September 1931
- Launched: 25 February 1933
- Sponsored by: Lou Henry Hoover (the wife of the President of the United States)
- Commissioned: 4 June 1934
- Decommissioned: 18 October 1946
- Stricken: 29 October 1946
- Honors and awards: American Defense Service Medal ("A" device); American Campaign Medal; European-African-Middle Eastern Campaign Medal (2 stars); Asiatic-Pacific Campaign Medal; World War II Victory Medal
- Fate: Sold for scrapping 31 January 1947
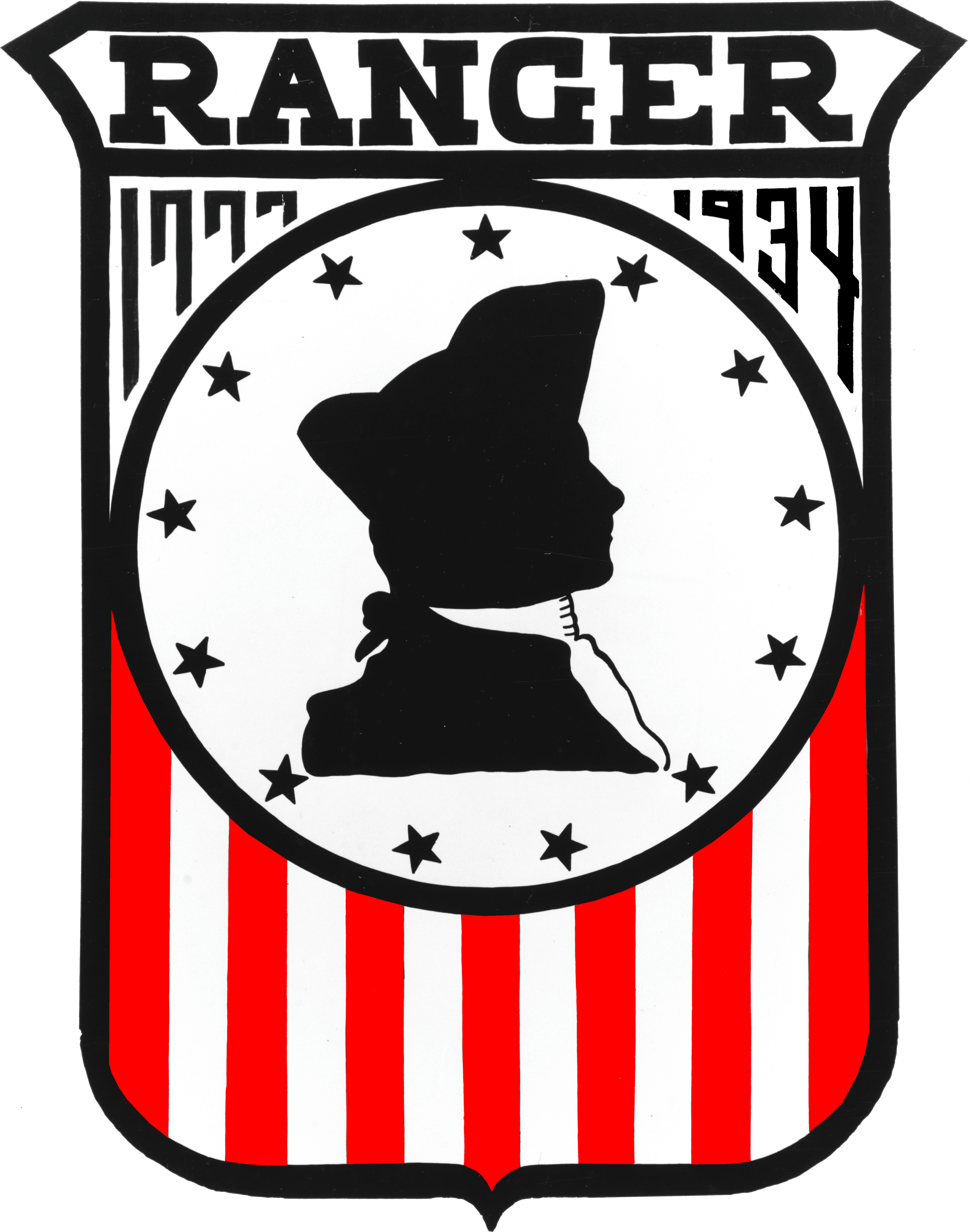
- Badge

General characteristics
- Type: Aircraft carrier
- Displacement: As built: 14,576 long tons (14,810 t) (standard); 17,577 long tons (17,859 t) (full load)
- Length: 730 ft (222.5 m) (w/l); 769 ft (234.4 m) (o/a); 709 ft (216.1 m) (fd)
- Beam: 80 ft (24.4 m) (waterline); 109 ft 5 in (33.4 m) (overall)
- Draft: 22 ft 4.875 in (6.8 m)
- Installed power: 6 × boilers; 53,500 shp (39,900 kW)
- Propulsion: 2 × steam turbines; 2 × shafts
- Speed: 29.3 knots (54.3 km/h; 33.7 mph)
- Range: 10,000 nmi (19,000 km; 12,000 mi) at 15 knots (28 km/h; 17 mph)
- Complement: 216 officers and 2,245 enlisted men including embarked air group (as built); 2,148 (1941)
- Sensors & processing systems: CXAM-1 radar
- Armament: 8 × 5 in (127 mm)/25 cal anti-aircraft guns; 40 × .50 in (12.7 mm) machine guns
- Armor: Belt 2 in (5.1 cm); Bulkheads: 2 in (5.1 cm); Deck: 1 in (2.5 cm) (over steering gear)
- Aircraft carried: 86 (maximum); 76 (normal)
- Aviation facilities: 3 × elevators; 3 × catapults

USS Ranger (CV-4) was an interwar United States Navy aircraft carrier, the only ship of its class. A Treaty ship, Ranger was the first U.S. vessel to be designed and built from the keel up as a carrier. She was relatively small, just 730 ft (220 m) long and under 15,000 tons, closer in size and displacement to the first US carrier—Langley—than later ships. An island superstructure was not included in the original design, but was added after completion.

Deemed too slow for use with the Pacific Fleet's carrier task forces against Japan, she spent most of World War II in the Atlantic Ocean, where the German fleet, the Kriegsmarine, was a weaker opponent. Ranger saw combat in that theater and provided air support for Operation Torch. In October 1943, she fought in Operation Leader, air attacks on German shipping off Norway. She was sold for scrap in 1947.

== Design and development ==
Work began in 1925 on the design of a fourth aircraft carrier for the US Navy, as a follow-on to the small Langley, converted from a collier, and the large Lexington and Saratoga, which were in the process of being converted from incomplete battlecruisers. Carrier number four was the Navy's first opportunity to design a ship built as an aircraft carrier. Preliminary design work occurred before extensive operation of the preceding three. Having limited experience to draw on, key characteristics of the design were derived from wargaming experience at the U.S. Naval War College. During design and construction many alterations would occur as a result of increasing experience with Langley, Lexington, and Saratoga.

The major limitation constraining any design was the Washington Naval Treaty of 1922. After Lexington and Saratoga, (Note: The experimental Langley did not count towards the treaty limits.) there were 69,000 long tons (70,000 t) remaining for construction of aircraft carriers. This resulted in modeling for three 23,000-long-ton carriers, four 17,250-ton carriers, or five 13,800-ton carriers. Of the three sizes, the smaller 13,800-ton was selected because the five hulls would have the largest aggregate aircraft capacity. Wargames had indicated that severe attrition to airframes and hulls would occur in any war. The college's solution was to maximize the number of aircraft and hulls allowable under the treaty. (Note: Earlier (1922–24) studies had proposed alternative carrier designs of 23,000 tons and 27,000 tons. Attempts to order one of these designs had failed.)

Initially, Ranger was designed as a flush-decker, like Langley, with nothing extending above the flight deck. Keeping the flight deck clear of obstacles complicated the arrangement of machinery. The smoke from her six boilers was vented up six small stacks, with three on each side of the aft hangar. The stacks were hinged and were rotated to a position parallel with the hangar deck during flight operations. The unusual stack arrangement was a carry-over from her flush-deck design. When an island was added midway through construction, rebuilding the uptakes into the island was rejected as too costly. The further aft the boilers were placed, the further aft the stacks could be too, dispersing smoke over less of the deck. Concerns about smoke dispersion impacted propulsion design. Size of the plant influenced both the placement of the boilers and the amount of smoke generated. A moderate 53,000 shp (40,000 kW) power plant could be placed further aft than a 100,000 shp (75,000 kW) plant without affecting trim. The smaller plant also produced fewer gasses than a 100,000 shp plant. Due to space limits, the carrier was equipped with geared turbines.

Nearly her entire upper deck was devoted to the hangar. The large height and open girders of the flight deck structure allowed for stowage of spare fuselages. The hangar deck was semi-open and had large roll-up metal curtain doors which could be closed in bad weather. The open hangar was adopted to allow the installation of two catapults on the hangar deck for the launching of observation aircraft. The catapults were dropped to save cost.

The flight deck was a light superstructure sheathed in wood. Designed as a weight-saving measure, the light wood deck was found to be easily repairable. Three elevators were provided to move aircraft between the flight deck and hangar deck. Outriggers at the edge of the flight deck provided extra stowage for aircraft on deck. The carrier operated 76 aircraft as constructed; equal to Lexington with half the displacement.

The carrier was one of the first U.S. Navy ships mounted with light automatic weapons to defend against dive-bombing attacks, and was initially armed with forty .50 cal machine guns. Complementing the machine guns were eight dual-purpose 5-inch (127 mm)/25 caliber guns controlled by two Mark 33 directors. The machine guns were arrayed along the gallery and the 5-inch guns arrayed with one at each corner of the gallery, two at the bow, and two on the fantail.

== Construction, refit, and modernization ==
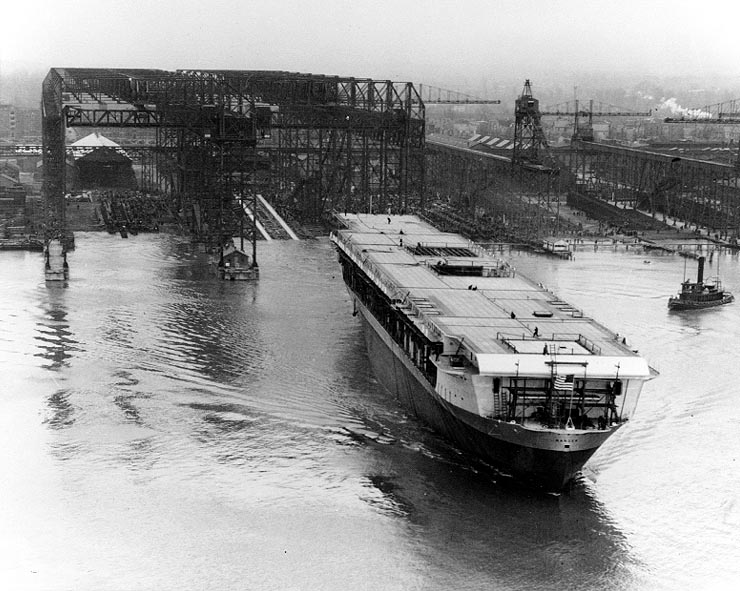
Ranger launching, 25 February 1933

Authorized by Congress on 13 February 1929, the U.S. Navy opened bids for the construction of the aircraft carrier on 3 September 1930. Newport News Shipbuilding and Drydock Company outbid Bethlehem Shipbuilding Corporation and New York Shipbuilding Company for the contract. In November, Newport News Shipbuilding received the contract to build her. The contract price was 15.2 million dollars. On 10 December, the name Ranger was assigned to the planned aircraft carrier.

Ranger was laid down on 26 September 1931 by the Newport News Shipbuilding & Drydock Co., Newport News, Virginia, and launched on 25 February 1933, sponsored by Lou Henry Hoover, First Lady of the United States. Late in construction the design was modified to include an island, increasing her displacement to 14,500 tons. Commencing trials on 1 May 1934, Ranger made 30.35 kn (56.21 km/h; 34.93 mph) and generated 58,700 shp (43,800 kW). She was commissioned at the Norfolk Navy Yard on 4 June 1934, with Captain Arthur L. Bristol in command.

To save money, Ranger was initially designed and commissioned without torpedo stowage or a torpedo bomber squadron. Wasp was designed and commissioned to match. On 17 October 1941 approval was given to install torpedo stowage during the next overhaul in conjunction with the activation of a torpedo squadron. On 10 January 1942 Torpedo Squadron 4 (VT-4) was activated on Ranger.

Across the years many alterations were made to her armament. The first change was to consolidate the 5-inch gun battery by pairing the four main deck guns with the four gallery deck guns. The anti-aircraft armament received a major upgrade when six 1.1-inch quadruple mounts were installed; the 1.1-inch battery replaced a battery of 3-inch (76 mm)/50 caliber guns installed months before as placeholders. In March 1942, the .50 cal machine guns were exchanged for much more capable Oerlikon 20 mm cannons. Similarly, the 1.1-inch battery was swapped with quadruple Bofors 40 mm guns in December 1942. Ranger's ultimate armament was six 40 mm quadruple mounts and forty-six 20 mm mounts.

On 13 December 1943, Chief of Naval Operations Admiral Ernest King had approved an extensive modernization. Since Ranger's commissioning, the size of carrier aircraft had grown enormously. Her flight deck supports were no longer capable of supporting the weight of a complete, modern air group. Other aircraft operating improvements were contemplated. The aft elevator was to be enlarged, the amidship elevator was to be replaced with a deck-edge elevator, and two flight deck catapults were to be installed. Weight and protection issues were to be solved by blistering the hull. Armament was to be increased with six additional 40 mm quadruple mounts. Admiral King favored having the conversions done, but the Bureau of Ships insisted that allocating the manpower and resources required to accomplish this would considerably delay the completion of new aircraft carriers under construction. The full project was indefinitely postponed on 5 April 1944 after the third, increasing estimate. After arriving at New York Harbor on 16 May, Ranger entered the Norfolk Navy Yard to have her flight deck strengthened, new aircraft catapults installed, and radar equipment updated. This provided her with the capability of night fighter-interceptor training.

== Service history ==
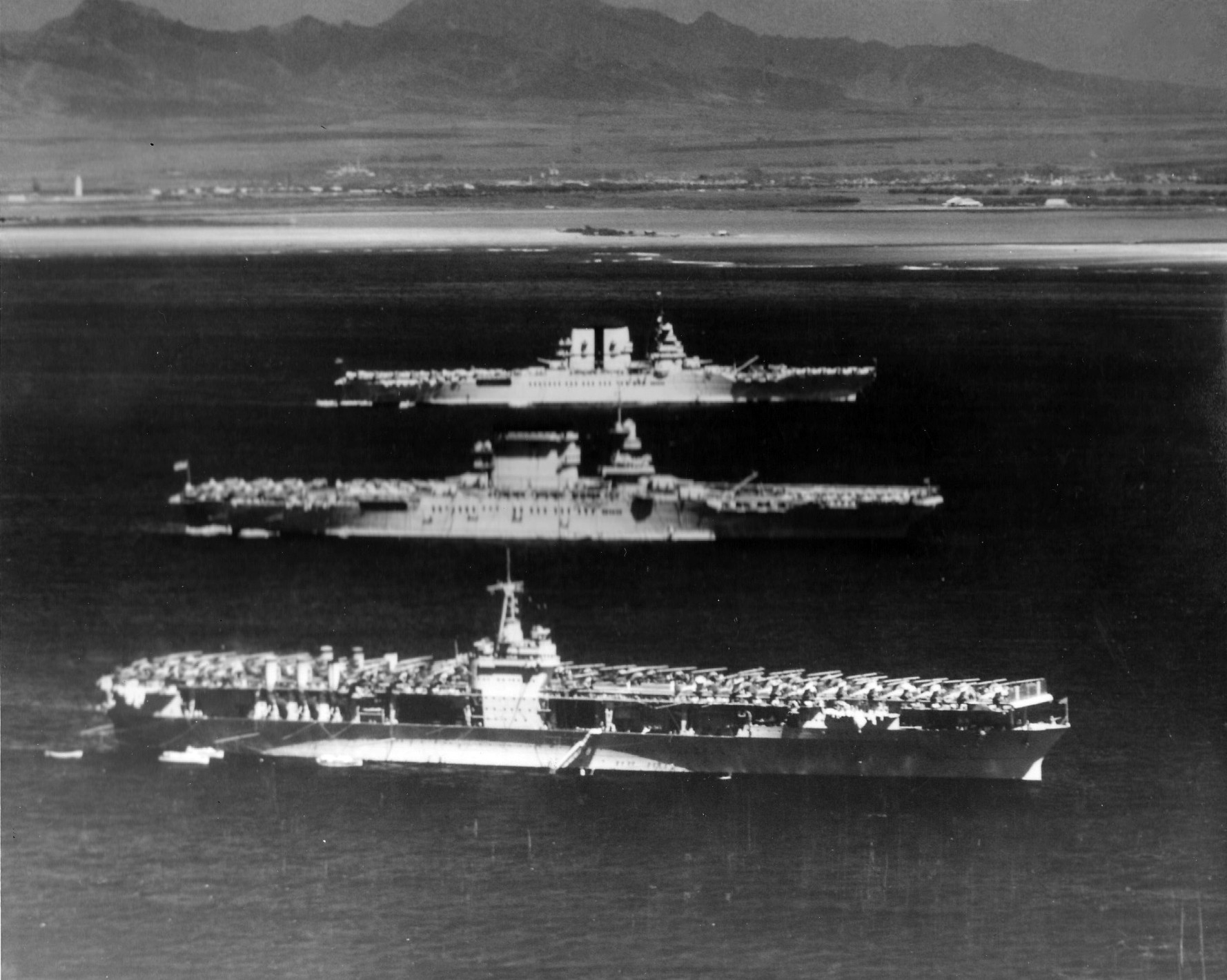
Ranger (bottom), Lexington (middle), and Saratoga off Honolulu, 8 April 1936

=== Inter-war period ===
Ranger conducted her initial flight operations off the Virginia Capes on 21 June 1934 and departed Norfolk on 17 August for a shakedown training cruise that took her to Rio de Janeiro, Buenos Aires, and Montevideo. She returned to Norfolk on 4 October for operations off the Virginia Capes and two stints in dry dock for post trial repairs until 1 April 1935, when she sailed for the Pacific. Transiting the Panama Canal on 7 April, she arrived in San Diego on 15 April. For nearly four years, she participated in fleet problems reaching to Hawaii, the first-ever carrier cold weather test trials in Alaska, and in western seaboard operations that took her as far south as Callao, Peru, and as far north as Seattle, Washington. On 4 January 1939, she departed San Diego for winter fleet operations in the Caribbean based at Guantánamo Bay, Cuba. She then steamed north to Norfolk, arriving on 20 April.

Ranger cruised along the eastern seaboard out of Norfolk and into the Caribbean Sea. In the fall of 1939, she commenced Neutrality Patrol operations, operating out of Bermuda along the trade routes of the middle Atlantic and up the eastern seaboard up to NS Argentia, Newfoundland.

In December 1940, Ranger's VF-4 became one of the first units to receive the newer Grumman F4F-3 Wildcats.

=== World War II ===
==== 1942 ====
In December 1941, she was returning to Norfolk from an ocean patrol extending to Port of Spain, Trinidad and Tobago, when the Japanese attacked Pearl Harbor. Arriving in Norfolk on 8 December, she sailed on 21 December for patrol in the South Atlantic. She then entered the Norfolk Navy Yard for repairs on 21 March 1942. Ranger was one of 14 ships to receive the early RCA CXAM-1 radar.

Ranger served as flagship of Rear Admiral Arthur B. Cook, Commander, Carriers, Atlantic Fleet until 6 April 1942, when he was relieved by Rear Admiral Ernest D. McWhorter, who also broke his flag in Ranger.

On 15 April 1942, Prime Minister Winston Churchill cabled President Franklin Delano Roosevelt requesting North Carolina and Ranger reinforce the British Eastern Fleet in the wake of the Indian Ocean Raid. The day before in response to advance notice of the reinforcement request routed through General George Marshall, who was then visiting London, Admiral Ernest King had already definitely stated that Ranger and any other major fleet unit could not be made available for the Indian Ocean. He stated the only manner at all in which the Navy could assist was by using Ranger to ferry the pursuit planes necessary to bring the 10th Air Force up to full operational strength. King's draft response to Churchill's insistence displayed a lack of tact. Roosevelt supported King, but toned down King's draft by playing up Ranger's faults to steer the British towards accepting the ferry mission.

Steaming to Naval Air Station Quonset Point, Rhode Island, Ranger loaded 68 Curtiss P-40Es and put to sea on 22 April, launching the Army planes on 10 May to land at Accra, on the Gold Coast of Africa (Ghana). The P-40s were a general reinforcement for the American Volunteer Group Flying Tigers (soon to be redesignated as the Army Air Forces' 23rd Fighter Group) in China, to replenish their losses as well as forming a second unit, the 51st Fighter Group. Although no difficulties were encountered in flying off Ranger's deck, errors in crossing Africa led to the loss of 10 or so en route. Upon return to Quonset Point on 28 May, she made a patrol to Argentia, Newfoundland.

After Rommel's victories in May and June, most notably the fall of Tobruk during the Battle of Gazala, the United States agreed to commit to the North African theater a total of nine combat groups, of which seven groups were to be in operation by the end of 1942. Ranger's contribution to the establishment of the Ninth Air Force was to ferry another 72 Army P-40s. This time she ferried a complete combat unit, 57th Fighter Group, which she launched off the coast of Africa for Accra on 19 July. Lessons learned from the previous ferry mission resulted in negligible losses, for which the 57th received commendations. The Group was operational with the Desert Air Force in time to participate in the Second Battle of El Alamein.

After calling at Trinidad, she returned to Norfolk for local battle practice until 1 October, then based her training at Bermuda, in the company of four new Sangamon-class escort carriers, ships converted from oil tankers to increase U.S. air power in the Atlantic Ocean.

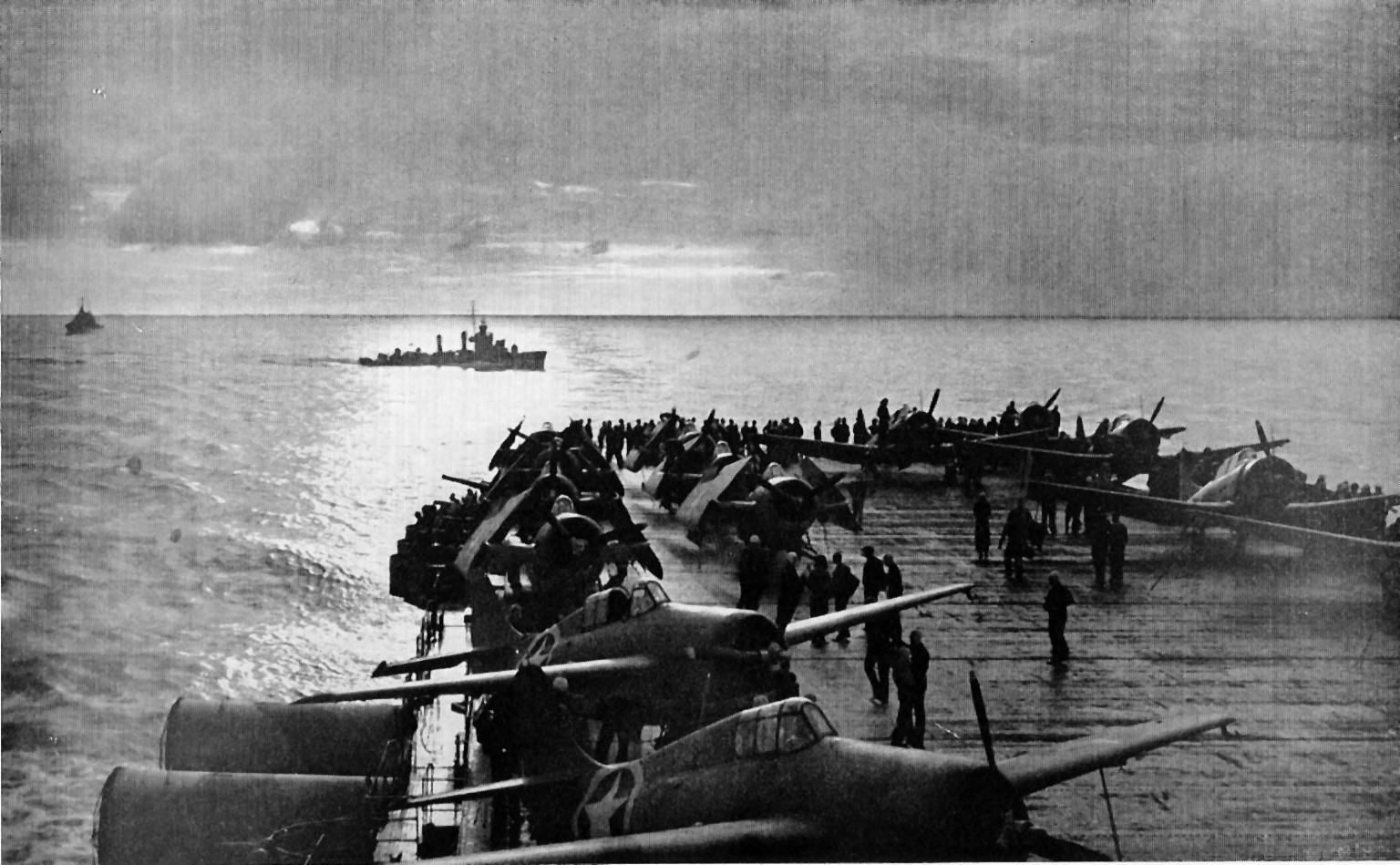
Aircraft on Ranger's deck during Operation Torch

As the largest carrier in the Atlantic Fleet, Ranger led the task force that comprised herself and the four escort carriers. These provided air superiority during the amphibious invasion of Vichy-ruled French Morocco. On 8 November 1942, Allied landings in French North Africa (Operation Torch) began. Vichy French government forces attacked the Allied forces in defense of the neutrality of French Morocco, in what became known as the Naval Battle of Casablanca.

It was still dark at 06:15 that day, when Ranger—stationed 30 mi (48 km) northwest of Casablanca—began launching her aircraft to support the landings made at three points on the Atlantic coast of North Africa (Operation Torch). Nine of her Wildcat fighters attacked the Rabat and Rabat-Sale aerodromes, headquarters of the French air forces in Morocco. Without loss to themselves, they destroyed 7 planes at one field, and 14 bombers at the other. Another flight destroyed 7 planes on the Port Lyautey field. Some of Ranger's planes strafed 4 French destroyers in Casablanca Harbor, while others strafed and bombed nearby shore batteries.

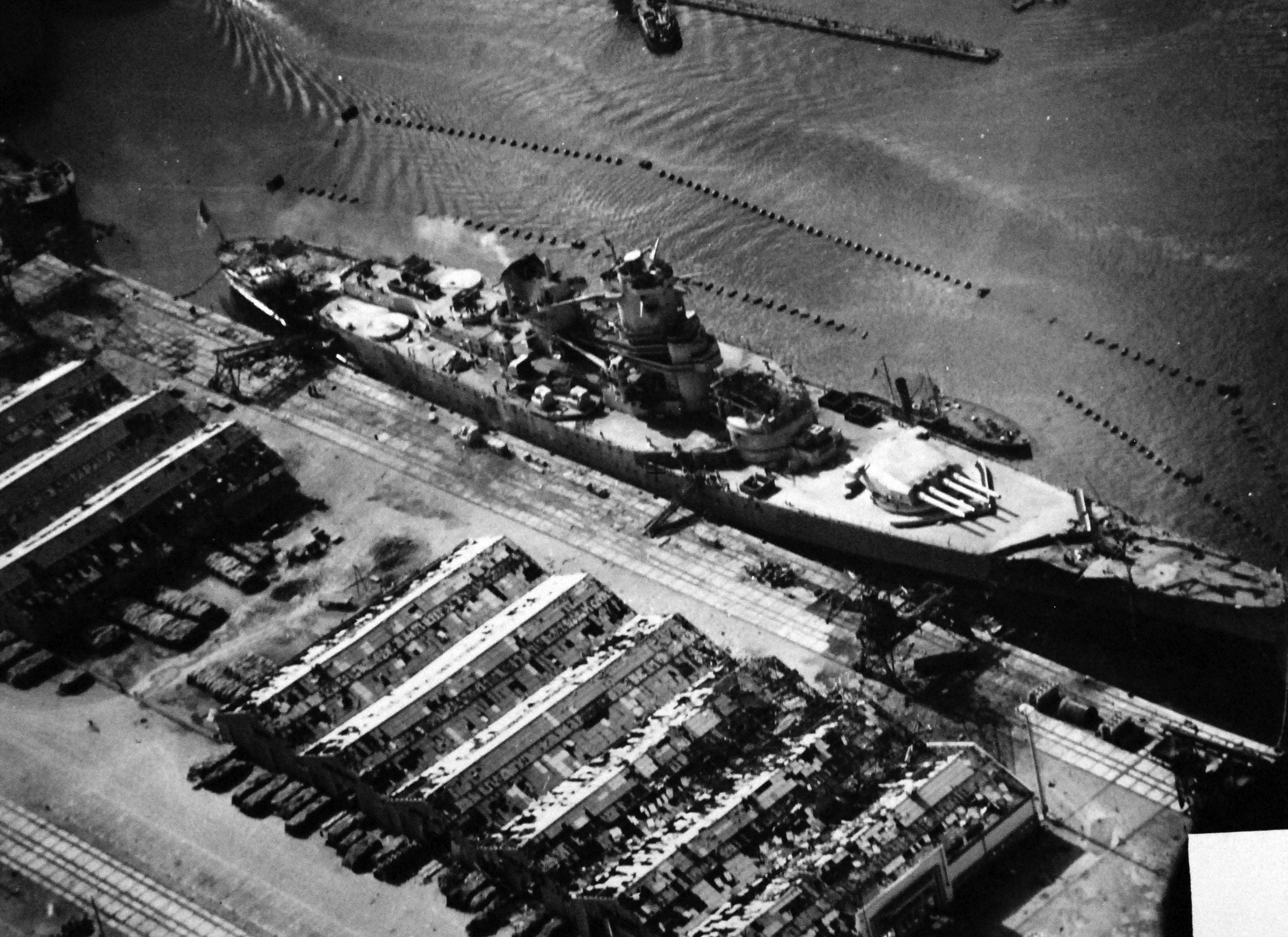
French battleship Jean Bart attacked by planes from Ranger

The Vichy French battleship Jean Bart opened fire with the four 15-inch (381 mm) guns of her one operational turret on U.S. warships covering the landings. She was hit and moderately damaged by Ranger's dive bombers, then silenced by the fifth hit from the 16-inch (406 mm) guns of the American battleship Massachusetts, which jammed the rotating mechanism of the one working turret.

Jean Bart's 15-inch turret was quickly repaired. On 10 November, Jean Bart opened fire again, and almost hit the heavy cruiser Augusta, the Task Force 34 flagship. In retaliation, bombers from Ranger inflicted severe damage on Jean Bart with two heavy bombs hitting the bow and the stern, causing the French battleship to sink into the harbor mud with decks awash. In addition to damaging and sinking Jean Bart, Ranger's attack aircraft scored two direct bomb hits on the French destroyer leader Albatros, completely wrecking her forward half and causing 300 casualties. They also attacked the French cruiser Primauguet as she sortied from Casablanca Harbor and dropped depth charges within killing range of two submarines. Ranger's planes also knocked out coastal defense and anti-aircraft batteries, destroyed more than 70 enemy aircraft on the ground, and shot down 15 aircraft in aerial combat. It was estimated that 21 enemy light tanks were immobilized and some 86 military vehicles destroyed – most of them troop-carrying trucks. Ranger had launched 496 combat sorties in the three-day operation, with 16 planes lost or damaged beyond repair.

Casablanca capitulated to the American forces on 11 November. Ranger departed from the Moroccan coast on 12 November, returning to Hampton Roads on 24 November and Norfolk on 14 December 1942.

On 2 December 1942, Ranger was again requested for in a cable from Churchill to Roosevelt, this time in connection to American misfortunes. The loss of Hornet in the Battle of Santa Cruz Islands kicked off a confused series of messages seeking British carrier reinforcement in the Pacific. To meet the request, Churchill offered both Illustrious and Victorious in exchange for Ranger replacing Victorious in the Home Fleet. King accepted one carrier but retained Ranger to use in the Atlantic or the Pacific at his discretion.

==== 1943 ====
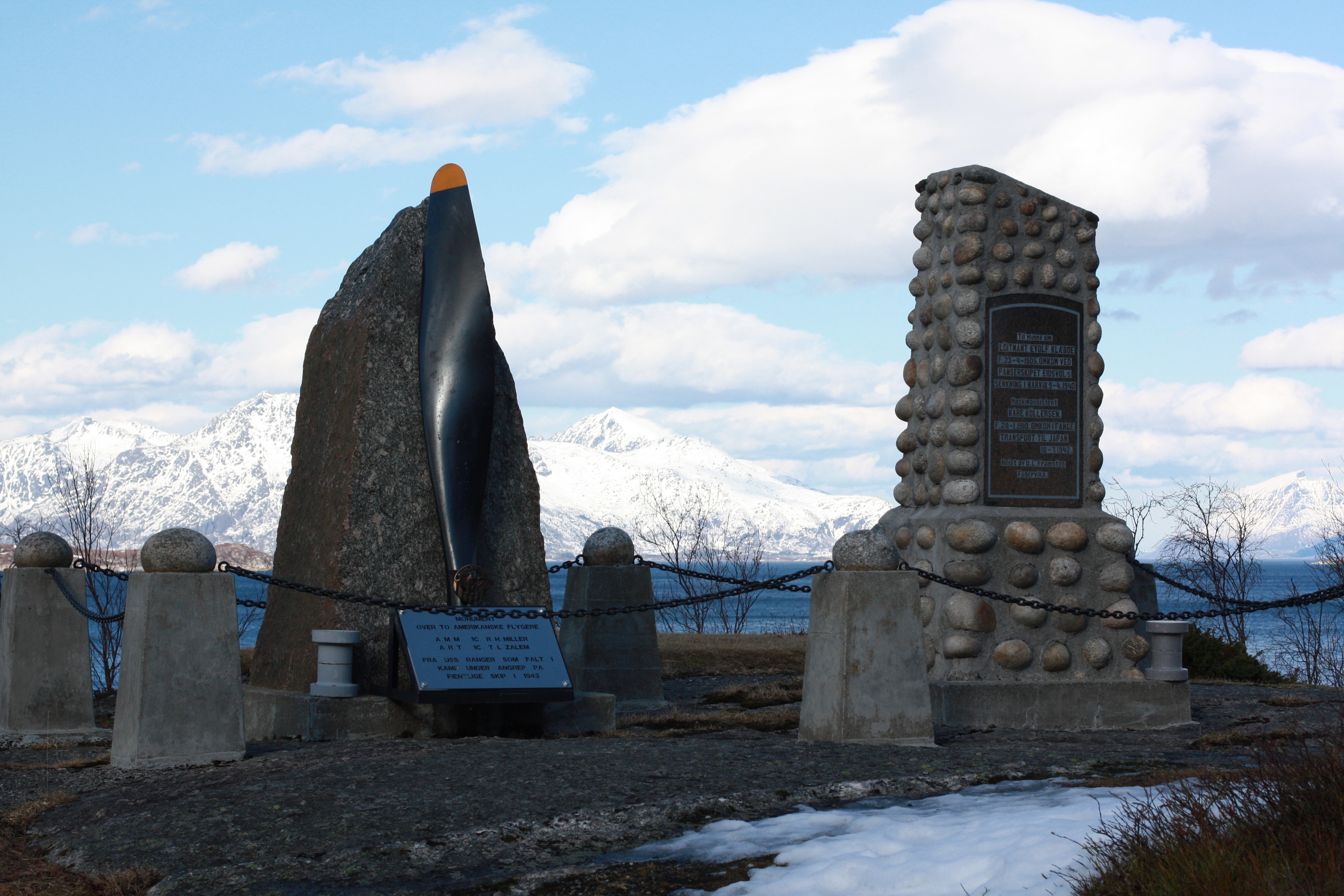
Memorial for pilots lost in battle in 1943, Fagervika, Norway

Following training in Chesapeake Bay, Ranger underwent an overhaul at the Norfolk Navy Yard from 16 December 1942 to 7 February 1943. By December the 33rd Fighter Group had taken heavy losses in Tunisia and needed reinforcement. Responding to Eisenhower's request, Ranger departed Norfolk on 8 January with the 325th Fighter Group aboard for delivery to Casablanca. She repeated the mission with another load, 75 P-40L fighters of the Army Air Forces' 58th Fighter Group to Africa, arriving at Casablanca on 23 February.

On 25 April 1943, German radio announced "Achtung! Achtung! We are proud to announce that a German submarine has sunk the United States aircraft carrier Ranger in the North Atlantic!" Following this broadcast, German news releases reported that Commander Otto von Bülow of the U-boat U-404, personally decorated by Adolf Hitler with Oak Leaves to the Knight's Cross, had "in addition to torpedoing four steamers, caught and sank the American aircraft carrier Ranger."

The US Navy, concerned about the impact of the German announcement on families of Ranger crewmen, issued a denial of the German claim. In the radio broadcast dated 15 February 1944, Captain Gordon Rowe, Commanding Officer of USS Ranger, stated:

The story that we were sunk was a coward's trick—spreading anxiety and fear among the innocent.... The next day we issued a denial and ... on October 4 we spread panic and chaos in the Norwegian shipping lanes. Only one thing we regret. We kept looking for the Tirpitz but either she wouldn't or couldn't come out.... Meanwhile, the Ranger, still very much afloat, is doing her job.

She patrolled and trained pilots along the New England coast steaming as far north as Halifax, Nova Scotia. Departing from Halifax on 11 August, she joined the British Home Fleet at Scapa Flow, Scotland, on 19 August, with which she patrolled the approaches to the British Isles.

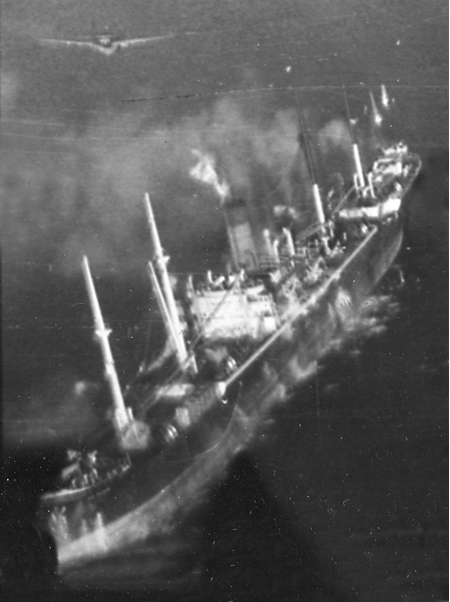
The freighter La Plata being attacked off Bodø

Ranger departed from Scapa Flow with the Home Fleet on 2 October to attack German shipping in Norwegian waters (Operation Leader). The objective of the force was the northern Norwegian port of Bodø. The task force reached launch position off Vestfjorden before dawn on 4 October completely undetected. At 06:18, Ranger launched 20 Douglas SBD Dauntless dive bombers and an escort of eight Wildcats. One division of dive bombers attacked the 8,000-gross register ton (GRT) freighter La Plata, while the rest continued north to attack a German ship convoy. The bombers severely damaged a 10,000 GRT tanker and a smaller troop transport. They also sank two of four small German merchant ships in the Bodø roadstead.

A second attack group from Ranger—consisting of 10 Grumman TBF Avenger torpedo bombers and six Wildcats—destroyed a German freighter and a small coastal ship, and bombed a troop-laden transport. Three of the aircraft were lost to anti-aircraft fire. On the afternoon of 4 October, Ranger was located by three German aircraft; her combat air patrol shot down two of the enemy planes and chased away the third.

Ranger returned to Scapa Flow on 6 October. She patrolled with the British 2nd Battle Squadron in waters extending northwestward to Iceland, and then she departed from Hvalfjord on 26 November, arriving at Boston on 3 December.

==== 1944–1945 ====
On 3 January 1944, Ranger became a training carrier out of Quonset Point, Rhode Island. This duty was interrupted on 20 April when she steamed to Staten Island, New York, to take on 76 Lockheed P-38 Lightning fighters—together with Army, Navy, and French Navy personnel—for transportation to Casablanca. Steaming out on 24 April for her fifth and final transatlantic ferry mission, she arrived at Casablanca on 4 May. The new aircraft were exchanged with damaged U.S. Army aircraft marked for repair in the U.S., while military passengers were embarked for the return to New York City. After New York City, she moved to Norfolk for refit on 19 May 1944.

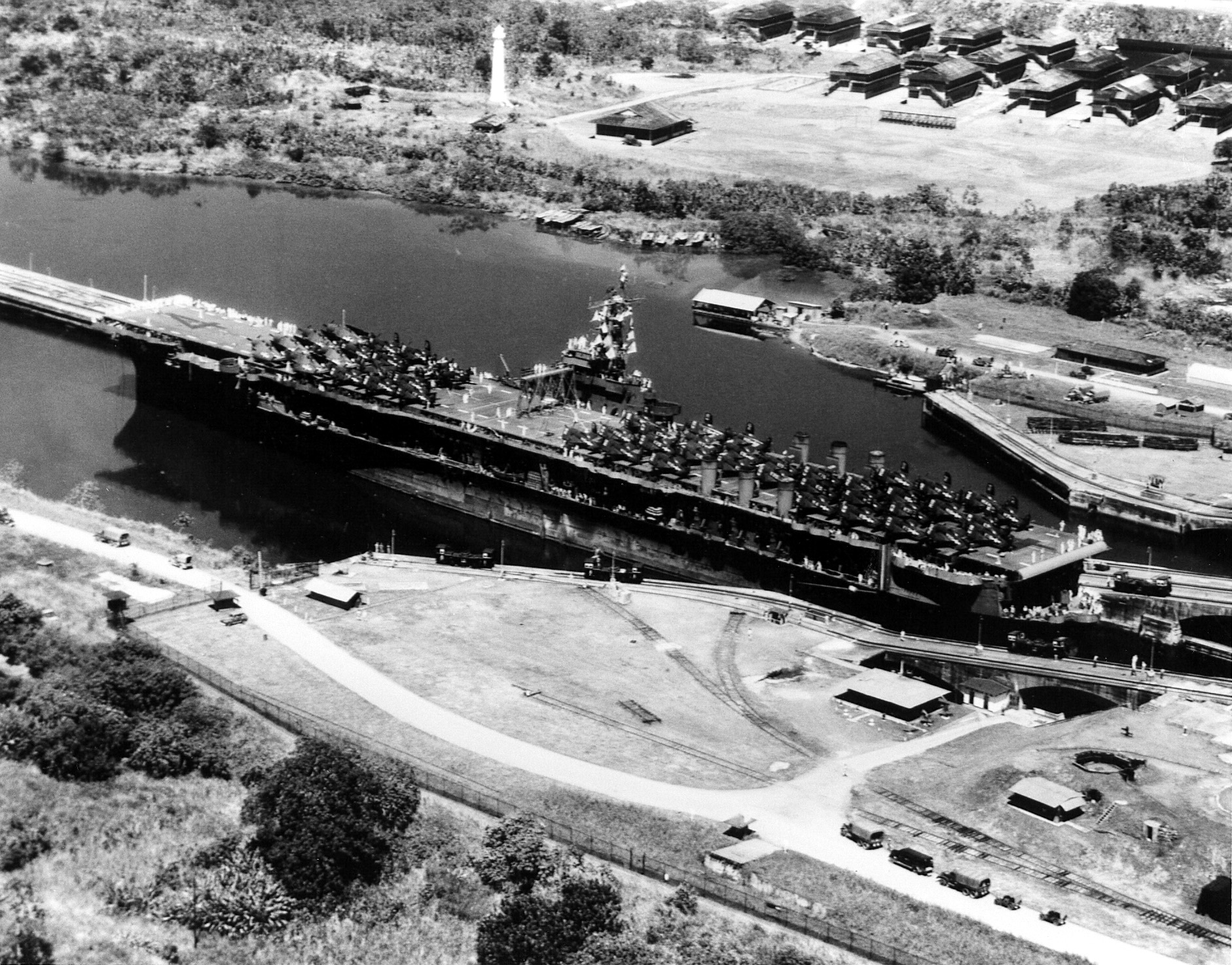
Ranger passing through the Panama Canal in 1945

On 11 July, she departed from Norfolk and headed for Panama. She transited the Panama Canal five days later, embarked several hundred U.S. Army passengers at Balboa, Panama, then sailed to San Diego, arriving there on 25 July. After embarking the men and aircraft of Night Fighting Squadron 102 and nearly 1,000 U.S. Marines, Ranger steamed for Hawaiian waters on 28 July, reaching Pearl Harbor on 3 August. During the next three months, Ranger conducted night carrier flight training operations out of Pearl Harbor.

Ranger departed from Pearl Harbor on 13 October to train new naval pilots for combat duty. Operating out of San Diego under the Commander, Fleet Air, Alameda, California, Ranger continued training air groups and squadrons along the California coast throughout the remainder of the war. Ranger was the only pre-war U.S. carrier never to have engaged Japanese forces in battle.

=== Post war ===
Departing San Diego on 30 September 1945, she embarked civilian and military passengers at Balboa and then steamed for New Orleans, Louisiana, arriving on 18 October. Following Navy Day celebrations there, she sailed on 30 October for brief operations at Pensacola, Florida, as a training carrier, later relieved in that role by Saipan. After calling at Norfolk, she entered the Philadelphia Naval Shipyard on 19 November for overhaul. She remained on the eastern seaboard until decommissioned at the Norfolk Navy Yard on 18 October 1946. Struck from the Naval Vessel Register on 29 October, she was sold for scrap to Sun Shipbuilding and Drydock Company, Chester, Pennsylvania, on 31 January 1947.

== Awards ==
Ranger was awarded two Service stars and various ribbons and awards:

American Defense Service Medal with "A" Device		American Campaign Medal
European-African-Middle; Eastern Campaign Medal with 2 stars	Asiatic-Pacific Campaign Medal	World War II Victory Medal

Service stars awarded
Action No.	Operation:Action	Operation Period	Period of CV-4 Participation	Battle Stars Awarded	Notes
(1) (2)	North African occupation: Algeria-Morocco landings North African occupation: Actions off Casablanca	8–11 Nov 42 8 Nov 42	8 Nov 42 – 11 Nov 42 8 Nov 42	1	One battle star awarded for participation in 1 or more of the North African occupation actions. Ranger participated in 2 actions (Actions No. (1) and (2)) out of 3 total actions that took place during the North African occupation and thus was awarded 1 star. The North African occupation was code named Torch.
(3)	Norway raid	2–6 Oct 43	2 Oct 43 – 6 Oct 43	1	Operation was code named Leader.
			Total Battle Stars	2	
