= USS Plymouth (PG-57) =

Gunboat of the United States Navy

Coordinates: 36°17′N 74°29′W

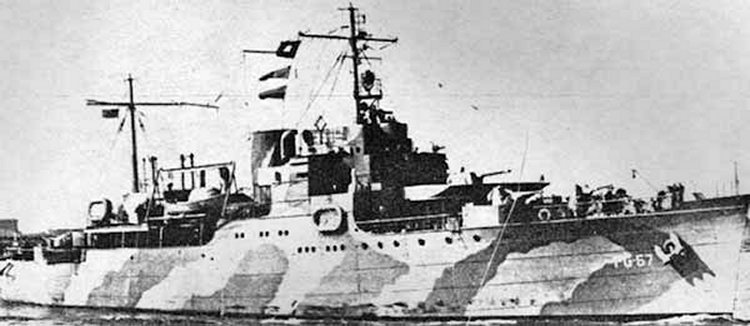
- USS Plymouth (PG-57)

History

United States
- Name: Plymouth
- Namesake: City of Plymouth, Massachusetts
- Builder: Friedrich Krupp Germaniawerft
- Laid down: 1931
- Acquired: 4 November 1941
- Commissioned: 29 December 1941
- Fate: Sunk, 5 August 1943

General characteristics
- Type: Gunboat
- Displacement: 1,500 long tons (1,524 t)
- Length: 264 ft 5 in (80.59 m)
- Beam: 46 ft 2 in (14.07 m)
- Draft: 19 ft (5.8 m)
- Speed: 15 knots (28 km/h; 17 mph)
- Complement: 155 officers and men
- Armament: 1 × 4 in (100 mm) gun; 3 × 3 in (76 mm) gun

USS Plymouth (PG-57), a patrol gunboat, was the fourth ship of the United States Navy to be named for Plymouth, Massachusetts, a town founded by the Pilgrims in 1620 on Plymouth Bay, about 35 miles southeast of Boston.

== Construction ==
Plymouth's keel was laid down in 1931, by the Friedrich Krupp Germaniawerft in Kiel, Germany, as Alva. She was originally built as a yacht for William Kissam Vanderbilt II and was named Alva, after his mother, Alva Vanderbilt Belmont.

She was given to the United States Navy on 4 November 1941, by her owner and was placed in reduced commission at Jacksonville, Florida, on 29 December 1941.

== Service history ==
=== Inshore Patrol Squadron, 1942–1943 ===
She departed Jacksonville on 31 December for the Navy Yard, Washington, DC, arriving there on 4 January 1942. She sailed on 21 January and the next day entered the Norfolk Navy Yard. On 23 January, she was placed in commission in ordinary for conversion to a patrol gunboat. She was placed in full commission 20 April and assigned to Inshore Patrol Squadron, 5th Naval District, based at Norfolk, Virginia. On 8 May she departed Norfolk, forming part of the escort for a convoy en route to Key West, Florida. She was on continuous escort duty between New York, Norfolk, and Key West until 27 August 1942, when she steamed from New York as convoy escort for Guantanamo Bay, Cuba, returning as escort for another convoy 12 September. She made two more convoy escort voyages to Guantanamo Bay and back to New York between 17 September and 24 October 1942. She then resumed escort duty between New York and Key West. During one period of this duty, 24 December 1942 to 13 June 1943, Plymouth completed eight convoy escort voyages from New York to Key West and back. On 2 March 1943, Plymouth collided with the submarine chaser USS SC-1024 off of Cape Hatteras, which resulted in the sinking of the submarine chaser.

=== Sinking, 5 August 1943 ===
On her last voyage, Plymouth departed New Jersey on 4 August 1943 as part of the escort for a convoy bound for Key West. At 21.37 hours the following evening she made underwater sound contact about 90 miles east of Elizabeth City, North Carolina. As she swung left, to bear on the target, a violent underwater explosion occurred just abaft the bridge. The force of the explosion rolled Plymouth to starboard. She then took on a heavy list to port with her entire port side forward of amidships in flames. She sank within two minutes.

Lieutenant Ormsby M. Mitchel Jr., USNR, in command of Plymouth, was thrown violently against a bulkhead and sustained serious injuries, which later required amputation of his left leg. Despite his own condition, he directed abandon ship operations, remaining at his post until the ship went down. Rescued from a raft by USCGC Calypso, Lieutenant Mitchel was awarded the Navy Cross for extraordinary heroism. Soundman 3/Class Franklin A. McGinty was also awarded the Navy Cross and Purple Heart posthumously. Ensign Rubin Keltch, of New York City, was also awarded the Navy Cross posthumously for his service aboard the Plymouth. Ensign Keltch unhesitatingly risked his life to assist several survivors to safety. After making sure they were safe he went back into the engine room to save several men, but although the men came out he never did.

Rescue operations were hampered by heavy seas and sharks. Only 85 of the crew survived to be taken to Norfolk on 6 August. A Board of Investigation concluded that Plymouth had been sunk by a torpedo fired from an enemy submarine. The submarine was U-566.

== Awards ==
- American Campaign Medal with one battle star
- World War II Victory Medal

== See also ==
- List of patrol vessels of the United States Navy
