= German submarine U-566 =

German World War II submarine

History

Nazi Germany
- Name: U-566
- Ordered: 24 October 1939
- Builder: Blohm & Voss, Hamburg
- Yard number: 542
- Laid down: 30 March 1940
- Launched: 20 February 1941
- Commissioned: 17 April 1941
- Fate: Scuttled on 24 October 1943

General characteristics
- Class & type: Type VIIC submarine
- Displacement: 769 tonnes (757 long tons) surfaced; 871 t (857 long tons) submerged
- Length: 67.10 m (220 ft 2 in) o/a; 50.50 m (165 ft 8 in) pressure hull
- Beam: 6.20 m (20 ft 4 in) o/a; 4.70 m (15 ft 5 in) pressure hull
- Height: 9.60 m (31 ft 6 in)
- Draught: 4.74 m (15 ft 7 in)
- Installed power: 2,800–3,200 PS (2,100–2,400 kW; 2,800–3,200 bhp) (diesels); 750 PS (550 kW; 740 shp) (electric)
- Propulsion: 2 shafts; 2 × diesel engines; 2 × electric motors
- Speed: 17.7 knots (32.8 km/h; 20.4 mph) surfaced; 7.6 knots (14.1 km/h; 8.7 mph) submerged
- Range: 8,500 nmi (15,700 km; 9,800 mi) at 10 knots (19 km/h; 12 mph) surfaced; 80 nmi (150 km; 92 mi) at 4 knots (7.4 km/h; 4.6 mph) submerged
- Test depth: 230 m (750 ft); Crush depth: 250–295 m (820–968 ft)
- Complement: 4 officers, 40–56 enlisted
- Armament: 5 × 53.3 cm (21 in) torpedo tubes (four bow, one stern); 14 × torpedoes or 26 TMA mines; 1 × 8.8 cm (3.46 in) deck gun (220 rounds); 1 x 2 cm (0.79 in) C/30 AA gun

Service record
- Part of: 1st U-boat Flotilla; 17 April 1941 – 24 October 1943
- Identification codes: M 42 015
- Commanders: Kptlt. Dietrich Borchert; 17 April 1941 – 24 July 1942; Oblt.z.S. Gerhard Remus; 25 July 1942 – 24 January 1943; Kptlt. Hans Hornkohl; 25 January – 24 October 1943
- Operations: 11 patrols: 1st patrol: 30 July – 19 August 1941; 2nd patrol: a. 30 August – 20 September 1941; b. 22 – 27 September 1941; c. 29 September – 2 October 1941; d. 3 – 4 December 1941; 3rd patrol: 9 – 23 December 1941; 4th patrol: 15 January – 9 March 1942; 5th patrol: 8 April – 30 June 1942; 6th patrol: 6 August – 5 September 1942; 7th patrol: 28 October – 1 December 1942; 8th patrol: 6 February – 25 March 1943; 9th patrol: 24 – 28 April 1943; 10th patrol: 5 July – 1 September 1943; 11th patrol: 18 – 24 October 1943
- Victories: 6 merchant ships sunk (38,092 GRT); 1 warship sunk (2,265 tons)

German submarine U-566 was a Type VIIC U-boat of Nazi Germany's Kriegsmarine during World War II. The submarine was laid down on 30 March 1940 at the Blohm & Voss yard in Hamburg as yard number 542, launched on 20 February 1941 and commissioned on 17 April under the command of Kapitänleutnant Dietrich Borchert.

She was scuttled by her crew on 24 October 1943 after being damaged by six depth charges from a British Wellington aircraft in the North Atlantic west of Portugal, in position 41°12′N 9°31′W. There were no casualties.

== Design ==
German Type VIIC submarines were preceded by the shorter Type VIIB submarines. U-566 had a displacement of 769 tonnes (757 long tons) when at the surface and 871 tonnes (857 long tons) while submerged. She had a total length of 67.10 m (220 ft 2 in), a pressure hull length of 50.50 m (165 ft 8 in), a beam of 6.20 m (20 ft 4 in), a height of 9.60 m (31 ft 6 in), and a draught of 4.74 m (15 ft 7 in). The submarine was powered by two Germaniawerft F46 four-stroke, six-cylinder supercharged diesel engines producing a total of 2,800 to 3,200 metric horsepower (2,060 to 2,350 kW; 2,760 to 3,160 shp) for use while surfaced, two Brown, Boveri & Cie GG UB 720/8 double-acting electric motors producing a total of 750 metric horsepower (550 kW; 740 shp) for use while submerged. She had two shafts and two 1.23 m (4 ft) propellers. The boat was capable of operating at depths of up to 230 metres (750 ft).

The submarine had a maximum surface speed of 17.7 knots (32.8 km/h; 20.4 mph) and a maximum submerged speed of 7.6 knots (14.1 km/h; 8.7 mph). When submerged, the boat could operate for 80 nautical miles (150 km; 92 mi) at 4 knots (7.4 km/h; 4.6 mph); when surfaced, she could travel 8,500 nautical miles (15,700 km; 9,800 mi) at 10 knots (19 km/h; 12 mph). U-566 was fitted with five 53.3 cm (21 in) torpedo tubes (four fitted at the bow and one at the stern), fourteen torpedoes, one 8.8 cm (3.46 in) SK C/35 naval gun, 220 rounds, and a 2 cm (0.79 in) C/30 anti-aircraft gun. The boat had a complement of between forty-four and sixty.

== Service history ==
In the eleven combat patrols of her career the U-boat sank seven vessels; six merchant ships totalling 38,092 GRT between February and November 1942, and the 2,265 tons patrol gunboat USS Plymouth (PG-57) on 5 August 1943.

She was initially involved in a short journey from Trondheim to Kirkenes, both in Norway in July 1941.

=== First and second patrols ===
The submarine's first and second patrols were marked by no more than an unsuccessful attack by a Soviet submarine off Kildin Island which caused no damage.

Before her third patrol, she moved between Kirkenes, Bergen and Kristiansand from September to December 1941.

=== Third, fourth and fifth patrols ===
The boat's third patrol took her from Kristiansand to Lorient in occupied France where she arrived on 23 December 1941. Her route took her through the gap between the Faroe and Shetland Islands, west of Ireland and into the Bay of Biscay.

Her fourth sortie was marked with the sinking of the Meropi on 14 February 1942 35 nautical miles (65 km; 40 mi) east-southeast of the Sambro light-house in Nova Scotia.

The U-boat's fifth patrol commenced with her departure from Brest, which she continued to use for the rest of her career, on 8 April 1942. She sank the Westmorland on 1 June 240 nautical miles (440 km; 280 mi) north-northeast of Bermuda, using a torpedo and her deck gun.

=== Sixth, seventh and eighth patrols ===
Her sixth outing saw the sinking of the Triton northeast of the Azores on 17 August 1942 and the Zuiderkerk on 28 August.

The boat's seventh foray was rewarded with the sinking of the Glenlea on 7 November in mid-Atlantic, but she was attacked and severely damaged by a Hudson of No. 233 Squadron RAF on 17 November 1942, forcing the U-boat to abort her patrol.

Her eighth patrol was fruitless.

=== Ninth patrol ===
On 26 April 1943 she was disabled by a British Leigh light-equipped Wellington of 172 Squadron. The damage was such (including an untraceable oil leak), that she was unable to dive and had to be escorted back to base.

=== Tenth patrol ===
She sank the USS Plymouth on 120 nautical miles (220 km; 140 mi) southeast of Cape Henry, Virginia on 5 August 1943, but was attacked by a Lockheed Ventura from United States Navy Squadron VP-128 300 nautical miles (560 km; 350 mi) east of Cape Charles, also in Virginia, on 7 August 1943. Her AA fire forced the aircraft to ditch (she had misidentified the aircraft as a B-25 Mitchell). She also shot a second Ventura down (also wrongly categorized as a Mitchell) after it and a Martin Mariner both attacked, without result.

=== Eleventh patrol ===
The boat was scuttled on 24 October 1943 after she came off worse with an encounter with a Wellington of 179 Squadron. The submarine's crew were picked up by a Spanish trawler and briefly interned. They survived the war and in 1970 met the aircrew who had been victorious.

=== Wolfpacks ===
U-566 took part in six wolfpacks, namely:

- Pfadfinder (21 – 27 May 1942)
- Blücher (14 – 28 August 1942)
- Natter (2 – 8 November 1942)
- Westwall (8 – 22 November 1942)
- Neptun (18 February – 3 March 1943)
- Westmark (6 – 11 March 1943)

== Summary of raiding history ==
| Date | Ship Name | Nationality | Tonnage (Note: Merchant ship tonnages are in gross register tons. Military vessels are listed by tons displacement.) | Fate |
|---|---|---|---|---|
| 15 April 1942 | Meropi | Greece | 4,181 | Sunk |
| 1 June 1942 | Westmorland | United Kingdom | 8,967 | Sunk |
| 17 August 1942 | Triton | Norway | 6,607 | Sunk |
| 28 August 1942 | City of Cardiff | United Kingdom | 5,661 | Sunk |
| 28 August 1942 | Zuiderkerk | Netherlands | 8,424 | Sunk |
| 7 November 1942 | Glenlea | United Kingdom | 4,252 | Sunk |
| 5 August 1943 | USS Plymouth | United States Navy | 2,265 | Sunk |

== Bibliography ==
- Busch, Rainer; Röll, Hans-Joachim (1999). German U-boat commanders of World War II : a biographical dictionary. Translated by Brooks, Geoffrey. London, Annapolis, Md: Greenhill Books, Naval Institute Press. ISBN 1-55750-186-6.
- Busch, Rainer; Röll, Hans-Joachim (1999). Der U-Boot-Krieg, 1939-1945: Deutsche U-Boot-Verluste von September 1939 bis Mai 1945 [German U-boat losses from September 1939 to May 1945] (in German). Vol. IV. Hamburg, Berlin, Bonn: Mittler. ISBN 3-8132-0514-2.
- Gröner, Eric; Jung, Dieter; Maass, Martin (1991). German Warships 1815-1945: U-boats and Mine Warfare Vessels. Vol. 2. Translated by Thomas, Keith; Magowan, Rachel. London: Conway Maritime Press. ISBN 0-85177-593-4.
- Kemp, Paul (1999). U-Boats Destroyed - German Submarine Losses in the World Wars. London: Arms & Armour. ISBN 1-85409-515-3.
