= Herbert Sohler =

German navy officer (1908–1991)

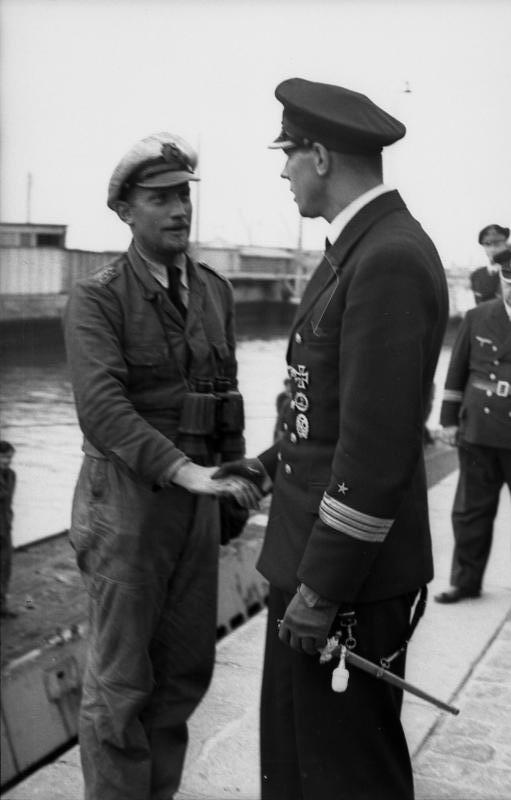
- St. Nazaire, France, U-455 landing. Left: KaptLt Hans-Heinrich Giessler, Right: KaptLt Herbert Sohler
- Born: 25 July 1908; Attendorn, Westphalia
- Died: 22 June 1991 (aged 82)
- Military career
- Allegiance: Weimar Republic; Nazi Germany
- Branch: Reichsmarine; Kriegsmarine
- Service years: 1928–1945
- Rank: Korvettenkapitän
- Commands: U-10; U-46
- Conflicts: World War II; St. Nazaire Raid

Herbert Sohler (25 July 1908, Attendorn, Westphalia – 22 June 1991) was a German U-boat commander during World War II.

== Career ==
Sohler commanded U-10 from 4 April to 31 July 1938. He then commanded U-46 from 2 November 1938 to 21 May 1940 for five patrols. During this time, Sohler was only able to sink two ships – the City of Mandalay in convoy HG 3 on 17 October 1939 and the Norwegian ship Rudolf on 21 December 1939. As such, his position as the commander of the U-46 was given to Engelbert Endrass. Sohler had also been deputy commander of 7th U-boat Flotilla from May to September 1940, before taking over full command of it from September 1940 until February 1942.

== Bibliography ==
- Busch, Rainer; Röll, Hans-Joachim (1999b). German U-boat commanders of World War II : a biographical dictionary. Translated by Brooks, Geoffrey. London, Annapolis, Md: Greenhill Books, Naval Institute Press. ISBN 1-55750-186-6.
