= German submarine U-455 =

German world war II submarine

Coordinates: 44°18.6′N 9°02.9′E

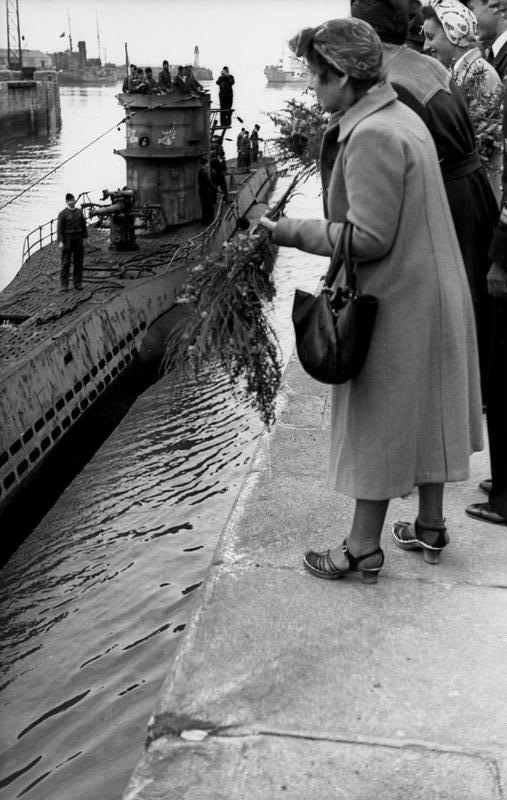
- U-455 arriving in St. Nazaire after her third patrol on 16 June 1942

History

Nazi Germany
- Name: U-455
- Ordered: 16 January 1940
- Builder: Deutsche Werke AG, Kiel
- Yard number: 286
- Laid down: 3 September 1940
- Launched: 21 June 1941
- Commissioned: 21 August 1941
- Fate: Sunk on 5 April 1944 in southeast of Genoa

General characteristics
- Class & type: Type VIIC submarine
- Displacement: 769 tonnes (757 long tons) surfaced; 871 t (857 long tons) submerged
- Length: 67.10 m (220 ft 2 in) o/a; 50.50 m (165 ft 8 in) pressure hull
- Beam: 6.20 m (20 ft 4 in) o/a; 4.70 m (15 ft 5 in) pressure hull
- Height: 9.60 m (31 ft 6 in)
- Draught: 4.74 m (15 ft 7 in)
- Installed power: 2,800–3,200 PS (2,100–2,400 kW; 2,800–3,200 bhp) (diesels); 750 PS (550 kW; 740 shp) (electric)
- Propulsion: 2 shafts; 2 × diesel engines; 2 × electric motors
- Speed: 17.7 knots (32.8 km/h; 20.4 mph) surfaced; 7.6 knots (14.1 km/h; 8.7 mph) submerged
- Range: 8,500 nmi (15,700 km; 9,800 mi) at 10 knots (19 km/h; 12 mph) surfaced; 80 nmi (150 km; 92 mi) at 4 knots (7.4 km/h; 4.6 mph) submerged
- Test depth: 230 m (750 ft); Crush depth: 250–295 m (820–968 ft)
- Complement: 4 officers, 40–56 enlisted
- Armament: 5 × 53.3 cm (21 in) torpedo tubes (four bow, one stern); 14 × torpedoes; 1 × 8.8 cm (3.46 in) deck gun (220 rounds); 1 × 3.7 cm (1.5 in) Flak M42 AA gun; 2 × 2 cm (0.79 in) C/30 AA guns

Service record
- Part of: 5th U-boat Flotilla; 21 August – 31 December 1941; 7th U-boat Flotilla; 1 January 1942 – 29 February 1944; 29th U-boat Flotilla; 1 March – 5 April 1944
- Commanders: Kptlt. Hans-Heinrich Giessler; 21 August 1941 – 22 November 1942; Kptlt. Hans-Martin Scheibe; 22 November 1942 – 5 April 1944
- Operations: 10 patrols: 1st patrol: 15 January – 28 February 1942; 2nd patrol: 21 – 30 March 1942; 3rd patrol: 16 April – 16 June 1942; 4th patrol: 22 August – 28 October 1942; 5th patrol: 24 November 1942 – 24 January 1943; 6th patrol: 23 March – 23 April 1943; 7th patrol: 30 May – 31 July 1943; 8th patrol: 20 September – 11 November 1943; 9th patrol: 6 January – 3 February 1944; 10th patrol: 22 February – 5 April 1944
- Victories: 3 merchant ships sunk (17,685 GRT)

German submarine U-455 was a Type VIIC U-boat built for Nazi Germany's Kriegsmarine for service during World War II. She was laid down on 3 September 1940, launched on 21 June 1941 and commissioned on 21 August with Kapitänleutnant Hans-Heinrich Giessler in command of a crew of 51.

Her service began with the 5th U-boat Flotilla, a training outfit. She was transferred to the 7th flotilla for operations at the beginning of 1942 and again to the 29th flotilla in March 1944.

She carried out ten patrols and was a member of six wolfpacks; she sank three ships for a total of 17,685 gross register tons (GRT).

She was lost in the Ligurian Sea (north of Corsica) on 5 April 1944. Her wreck was discovered in 2005 off Genoa. She had previously been thought to be near La Spezia.

== Design and construction ==
German Type VIIC submarines were preceded by the shorter Type VIIB submarines. U-455 had a displacement of 769 tonnes (757 long tons) when at the surface and 871 tonnes (857 long tons) while submerged. She had a total length of 67.10 m (220 ft 2 in), a pressure hull length of 50.50 m (165 ft 8 in), a beam of 6.20 m (20 ft 4 in), a height of 9.60 m (31 ft 6 in), and a draught of 4.74 m (15 ft 7 in). The submarine was powered by two Germaniawerft F46 four-stroke, six-cylinder supercharged diesel engines producing a total of 2,800 to 3,200 metric horsepower (2,060 to 2,350 kW; 2,760 to 3,160 shp) for use while surfaced, two Siemens-Schuckert GU 343/38–8 double-acting electric motors producing a total of 750 metric horsepower (550 kW; 740 shp) for use while submerged. She had two shafts and two 1.23 m (4 ft) propellers. The boat was capable of operating at depths of up to 230 metres (750 ft).

The submarine had a maximum surface speed of 17.7 knots (32.8 km/h; 20.4 mph) and a maximum submerged speed of 7.6 knots (14.1 km/h; 8.7 mph). When submerged, the boat could operate for 80 nautical miles (150 km; 92 mi) at 4 knots (7.4 km/h; 4.6 mph); when surfaced, she could travel 8,500 nautical miles (15,700 km; 9,800 mi) at 10 knots (19 km/h; 12 mph). U-455 was fitted with five 53.3 cm (21 in) torpedo tubes (four fitted at the bow and one at the stern), fourteen torpedoes, one 8.8 cm (3.46 in) SK C/35 naval gun, (220 rounds), one 3.7 cm (1.5 in) Flak M42 and two 2 cm (0.79 in) C/30 anti-aircraft guns. The boat had a complement of between forty-four and sixty.

U-455 was one of four Type VIIC submarines ordered from Deutsche Werke on 16 January 1940. The submarine was laid down at Deutsche Werke's Kiel shipyard on 3 September 1939 as yard number 286. She was launched on 21 June 1941 and commissioned on 21 August that year.

== Service history ==
On commissioning, U-455 joined the 5th U-boat Flotilla at Kiel for crew training. In January 1942, she was assigned to the operational 7th U-boat Flotilla.

=== First, second and third patrols ===
U-455's operational career began when she left Kiel on 15 January 1942. It was initially planned that the submarine take part in operations in the Atlantic, but she was one of five U-boats that were ordered to patrol between Scotland and Iceland, and from 25 January, U-455, along with U-352 and U-435, made a reconnaissance of Seyðisfjörður fjord to search for an assembly area for allied convoys. The submarines found nothing, and U-455 returned to Bergen, empty-handed, on 28 February 1942.

The boat's second patrol saw the submarine transit to France, leaving Bergen on 21 March 1942 and arriving in St. Nazaire on 30 March. She would continue to use this port for most of the rest of her career.

On 16 April 1942, U-455 left on her 3rd patrol, bound for the east coast of America. She was ordered to Canadian waters to intercept a troopship convoy, but this operation proved unsuccessful. On 3 May 1942, U-455 torpedoed the lone British tanker British Workman south of Cape Race, Newfoundland. On 18 May, U-455 unsuccessfully attacked a passenger liner south of New York, and on 21 May joined the Pfadfinder group of submarines, operating 400 nautical miles (740 km; 460 mi) east of New York in an attempt to locate shipping traffic which U-Boat command had been diverted away from the coast. The search found nothing, and U-455 set course back to France in early June. On 11 June 1942, the submarine sank a second British tanker, the George H Jones, NNE of the Azores. She returned to St. Nazaire on 16 June 1942, having spent 62 days at sea.

=== Fourth and fifth patrols ===
On 22 August 1942, U-455 left on her fourth patrol, again bound for American waters. The submarine carried a mixed load of magnetic mines and torpedoes, and was tasked with mining Charleston, South Carolina. U-455 laid its minefield on 18 September, but the minefield was discovered and swept by the US Navy, and did not produce any sinkings. She was then ordered to patrol off St. John's, Newfoundland, arriving there at the start of October. U-455 patrolled off St. John's for two weeks, before a failure of her Gyrocompass caused the operation to be aborted. Only two ships were seen, both too far away to attack. U-455 returned to St. Nazaire on 28 October 1942, after a patrol of 68 days. Given the relative lack of success (with only two ships sunk after four patrols), U-455's commander, Kapitänleutnant Hans-Hienrich Giessler, left the submarine for other duties.

U-455's fifth patrol started on 24 November 1942 under the command of Kapitänleutnant Hans-Martin Scheibe. She was ordered to join group Draufgänger patrolling west of Ireland in wait for an expected westbound ONS convoy. With no sign of this convoy appearing, on 7 December Draufgänger was ordered to attack eastbound Convoy HX 21. In total 22 U-Boats were sent against the convoy, but a well handled escort together with air support from Iceland-based Liberator aircraft, meant that few of the submarines were able get into position to attack the convoy. Only two merchant ships were sunk, at the cost of two U-Boats lost. U-455 made no attacks. On 13 December, the submarine joined group Ungestüm. The group was unsuccessfully directed against several convoys before on 26 December it was ordered against Convoy ONS 154. U-455 attacked on the night of 28/29 December, her torpedoes missing their targets, but in total 14 ships from the convoy were lost. U-455 refuelled from the tanker submarine U-463 west of the Azores during her return to base, arriving at St. Nazaire on 24 January 1943.

=== Sixth, seventh, eighth and ninth patrols ===
On 23 March 1943, U-455 left St. Nazaire on her sixth patrol. On 24 March, a crewman was injured in an accident with one of the boat's own AA guns. On 10 April, U-455 laid 12 mines off Casablanca. One of these sank the French freighter Rouennais on 25 April. On the night of 13/14 April, U-455 picked up the crew of the submarine U-167, which had been scuttled earlier that month, off Las Palmas. U-455 then rendezvoused with U159 and U518 and redistributed the 50 survivors from U-167 between the three boats before returning to France. U-455 reached St. Nazaire on 23 April 1943. U-455 left on her seventh patrol on 30 May 1943 for independent operations in the Atlantic. On 2 June, U-455 was attacked twice by British aircraft but received no damage. The submarine operated west of the Azores, and in late June, moved to west of Lisbon. She attacked a steamship on 20 July, but all five torpedoes missed. The submarine returned to St Nazaire on 31 July.

On 20 September 1943, U-455 left port on her eighth patrol, with orders to pass through the Strait of Gibraltar to reinforce German forces in the Mediterranean Sea following the Allied invasion of Italy earlier that month. Strong anti-submarine forces at Gibraltar prevented U-455 passing through the Strait, and U-455, along with U-264 (which had also failed to pass through the Strait), were ordered to join group Rossbach operating south west of Iceland. On 4 October 1943, U-455, together with U-264 and U-422, rendezvoused with the tanker submarine U-460 north of the Azores. U-264 had just finished refuelling when a Grumman TBF Avenger from the carrier USS Card spotted the submarines and attacked. The attack was unsuccessful, but the Avenger called up more aircraft from Card. U-455 dived before these reinforcements arrived, but the other three boats remained on the surface. U-460 was sunk with the loss of all aboard. (Note: U-422 was sunk by aircraft from Card later that day.) U-455 collided with U-631 in mid-October, causing sufficient damage for U-455 to abort her patrol. U-455 arrived at Lorient on 11 November 1943.

On 6 January 1944, U-455 left Lorient in another attempt to enter the Mediterranean. She passed through the Strait of Gibraltar on the night of 21/22 January, and arrived at Toulon on 3 February 1944.

=== Tenth patrol and loss ===
On 22 February 1944, U-455 left Toulon on a minelaying operation. On 5 April 1944, U-455 was lost with all hands, sunk by a mine in the German minefield Fuß-Ball-Klub south-west of Genoa. Her last transmission was on 2 April 1944, when she radioed-in while returning from her patrol off Algiers. The wreck of U-455 was discovered in 2005. It had been previously believed that she had been sunk off La Spezia on 6 June, possibly to a German mine.

=== Wolfpacks ===
U-455 took part in six wolfpacks, namely:

- Hecht (27 January – 4 February 1942)
- Pfadfinder (21 – 27 May 1942)
- Draufgänger (29 November – 11 December 1942)
- Ungestüm (11 – 30 December 1942)
- Without name (11 – 23 July 1943)
- Schlieffen (14 October 1943)

== Summary of raiding history ==
Date	Ship Name	Nationality	Tonnage (GRT)	Fate
3 May 1942	British Workman	United Kingdom	6,994	Sunk
11 June 1942	Geo H. Jones	United Kingdom	6,914	Sunk
25 July 1943	Rouenais	Free France	3,777	Sunk (mine)

== Bibliography ==
- Blair, Clay (2000a). Hitler's U-Boat War: The Hunters 1939–1942. London: Cassell & Co. ISBN 0-304-35260-8.
- Blair, Clay (2000b). Hitler's U-Boat War: The Hunted 1942–1945. New York: Modern Library. ISBN 0-679-64033-9.
- Busch, Rainer; Röll, Hans-Joachim (1999). German U-boat commanders of World War II : a biographical dictionary. Translated by Brooks, Geoffrey. London, Annapolis, Md: Greenhill Books, Naval Institute Press. ISBN 1-55750-186-6.
- Busch, Rainer; Röll, Hans-Joachim (1999). Deutsche U-Boot-Verluste von September 1939 bis Mai 1945 [German U-boat losses from September 1939 to May 1945]. Der U-Boot-Krieg (in German). Vol. IV. Hamburg, Berlin, Bonn: Mittler. ISBN 3-8132-0514-2.
- Gröner, Erich; Jung, Dieter; Maass, Martin (1991). U-boats and Mine Warfare Vessels. German Warships 1815–1945. Vol. 2. Translated by Thomas, Keith; Magowan, Rachel. London: Conway Maritime Press. ISBN 0-85177-593-4.
- Kemp, Paul (1997). U-Boats Destroyed – German Submarine Losses in the World Wars. Arms & Armour Press. ISBN 1-85409-321-5.
- Niestlé, Axel (2014). German U-Boat Losses During World War II: Details of Destruction. Barnsley, UK: Frontline Books. ISBN 978-1-84832-210-3.
- Wynn, Kenneth (2003) [1997]. U-Boat Operations of the Second World War: Volume 1: Career Histories, U1—U510. London: Caxton Editions. ISBN 1-84067-525-X.
