= Hans-Heinrich Giessler =

German U-boat commander during World War II

- Hans-Heinrich Gießler
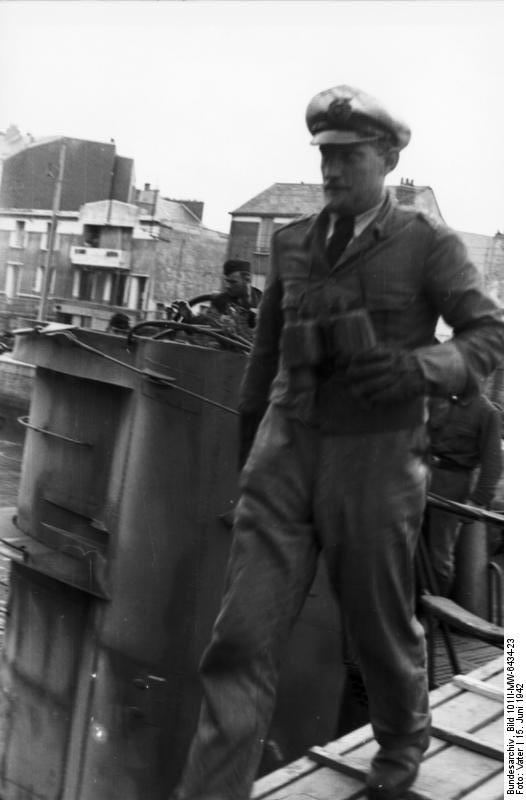
- Kapitänleutnant Giessler in Saint-Nazaire on June 16, 1942
- Born: 12 January 1911; Berlin, German Empire
- Died: 21 August 1991 (aged 80); Germany
- Military career
- Allegiance: Weimar Republic (to 1933); Nazi Germany (to 1945)
- Branch: Reichsmarine; Kriegsmarine
- Service years: 1931–1945
- Rank: Korvettenkapitän
- Unit: 7th U-boat Flotilla
- Commands: U-455; Z20 Karl Galster
- Conflicts: World War II
- Awards: Iron Cross 2nd Class; U-boat War Badge (1939); Iron Cross 1st Class

Hans-Heinrich Giessler (2 January 1911 - 21 August 1991), also spelled as Hans-Heinrich Gießler, was a German U-boat commander and destroyer commander during World War II. Under Giessler's command, the submarine U-455 was credited with sinking two Allied ships totaling 13,908 gross register tons (GRT). During the latter half of Giessler's career he commanded the German destroyer Z20 Karl Galster, a Type 1936 destroyer, and worked for the Reich Ministry of Armaments and War Production.

== Early life ==
Hans-Heinrich Giessler was born on 2 January 1911 in Berlin, then part of the Kingdom of Prussia.

== Military career ==
=== Early career ===
Giessler began his career in the Reichsmarine, the state Navy of the Weimar Republic, on 1 April 1931 as an Offiziersanwärter (officer candidate) of Crew 31. Geissler was trained aboard the Niobe, a German training schooner, from 30 June 1931 until 29 June 1931. On 14 October 1931 Geissler was officailly accepted into the Reichmarine as a Seekadett (cadet officer), before being trained on the German cruiser Karlsruhe, a Königsberg-class cruiser, from 17 October 1931 until 4 January 1933. Geissler underwent naval infantry training from 5 January 1933 until 29 March 1933 before taking the officers examination at the Mürwik Naval School. Following his exams from 30 March 1933 until 1 October 1934 Geissler underwent a series of schools and exams including artillery training, mine warfare, torpedo training, signal training, and anti-aircraft training before serving aboard the German cruiser Deutschland from 2 October 1934 to 23 April 1935, during this time Giessler was promoted to the rank of Leutnant zur See on 1 April 1935. Geissler briefly served aboard the SMS Schleswig-Holstein from 24 April 1935 to August 12, 1935 as an Oberleutnant zur See before being assigned as the 1st Watch Officer (1WO) of the German destroyer Z16 Friedrich Eckoldt from 12 August 1938 until October 1939. From roughly October 1939 until 1941 Geissler underwent u-boat training il Keil, Pillau, Memel, and Mürwik before the construction of German submarine U-455 began on 16 January 1940.

Giessler was promoted to the rank of Kapitänleutnant on 1 October 1939 and was given command of German submarine U-455 which was attached to the 7th U-boat Flotilla headquartered at Kiel and later Saint-Nazaire. Geissler commanded U-455 from 21 August 1941 until 22 November 1942 on four total patrols (185 days). During his career with U-455 Geissler was responsible for sinking two ships, the British Workman on 3 May 1942 and the Geo H. Jones. Geissler was eventually replaced by Kapitänleutnant Hans-Martin Scheibe as the captain of U-455 who would be killed with the rest of the crew on 5 April 1944 just southeast of Genoa.

=== Later career ===
After serving aboard U-455 Geissler served at the German Torpedo Inspectorate (German: Torpedoinspektion) from December 1942 until October 1944. During this time Geissler was promoted to the rank of Korvettenkapitän on 1 October 1943. Following his term as a torpedo inspector beginning in November 1944 Geissler briefly served under Albert Speer in the Reich Ministry of Armaments and War Production before being placed on active duty in early 1945. By February 1945 Geissler served as the captain of German destroyer Z20 Karl Galster, a Type 1936 destroyer before surrendering the ship to British forces in Kiel. From 8 May 1945 until March 1946 Geissler was held as a prisoner of war by the British.

== Later life ==
Giessler died on 21 August 1991 at the age of 80 years old.

== Awards and decorations ==
Giessler's awards and decorations include:

- Iron Cross 2nd Class - 1939.
- U-boat War Badge (1939) - 31 March 1942.
- Iron Cross 1st Class - 17 June 1942.

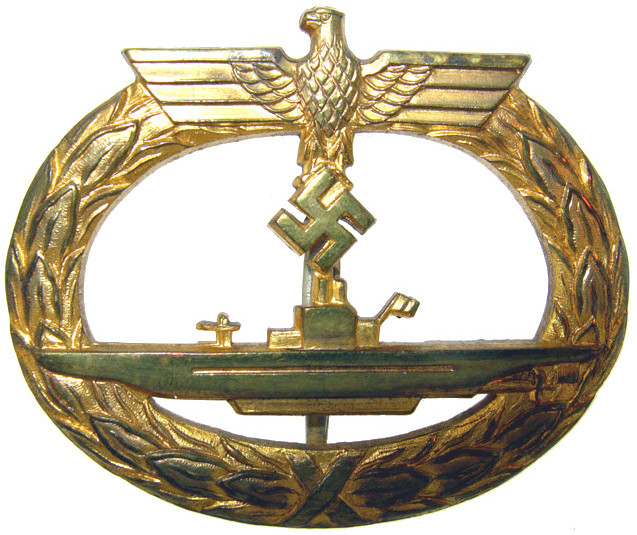

== Gallery ==
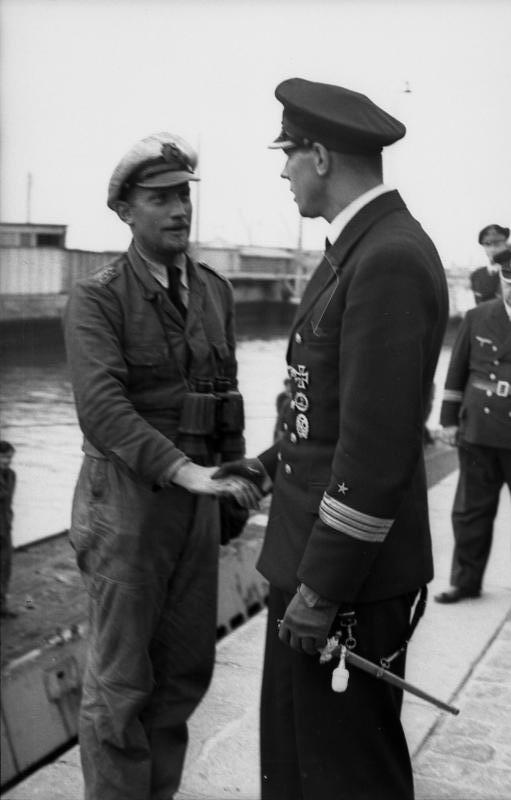
Kapitänleutnant Hans-Heinrich Giessler (left) shaking hands with KaptLt Herbert Sohler in Saint-Nazaire on 16 June 1942

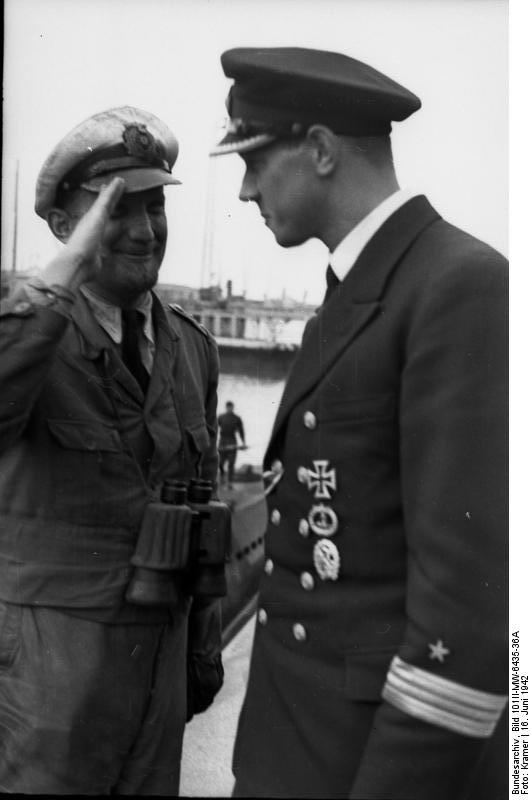
Giessler (left) and Sohler (right) in St. Nazaire

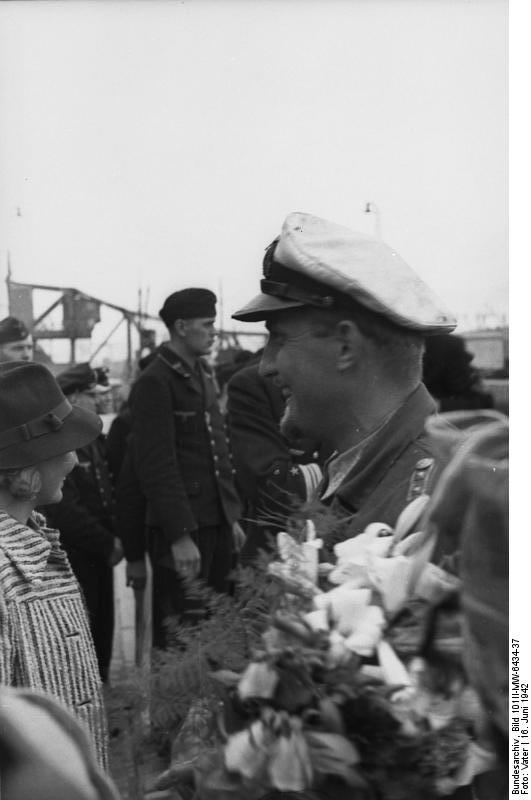
Giessler and the crew of U-455 returning from patrol in June 1942 in St. Nazaire

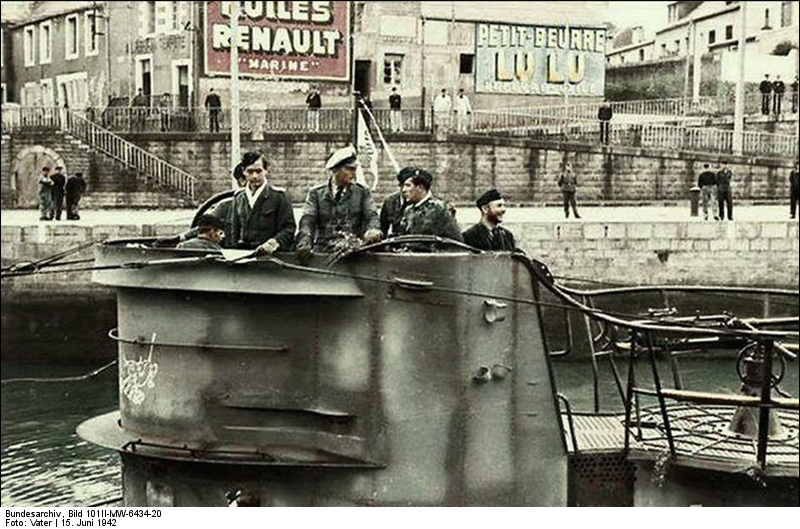
Giessler (center with white hat) on the conning tower of U-455 in St. Nazaire
