= Otto von Bülow =

German navy officer and world war II U-boat commander

- Born: 16 October 1911; Wilhelmshaven
- Died: 5 January 2006 (aged 94); Wohltorf
- Military career
- Allegiance: Weimar Republic; Nazi Germany; West Germany
- Branch: Reichsmarine; Kriegsmarine; German Navy
- Service years: 1930–45; 1956–70
- Rank: Kapitän zur See
- Commands: 23rd U-boat Flotilla; U-404; German Destroyer Z-6
- Conflicts: World War II
- Awards: Knight's Cross of the Iron Cross with Oak Leaves

Otto von Bülow (16 October 1911 – 5 January 2006) was a German U-boat commander in World War II, and a captain in the Bundesmarine. He was a recipient of the Knight's Cross of the Iron Cross with Oak Leaves of Nazi Germany.

== Family ==
Bülow was born in Wilhelmshaven as the son of Captain Otto von Bülow (1874–1930) and Johanna Meyer (1883–1937). He was descended from the Bülow family, an old aristocratic family from Mecklenburg. On 5 June 1937 he married Helga Christiansen (born 2 April 1914 in Rødding, Denmark, then a part of Germany). Bülow was the chairman (1970–1988) and afterwards honorary chairman of the Bülow Family Association.

== Military career ==
Bülow joined the Kriegsmarine on 1 April 1930, and completed his basic training in Stralsund. His first assignment was on the Niobe, a German training ship, from July until October 1930. He then served on the Light Cruiser Emden until the start of 1932. He then went back to Stralsund for more training, and between 1932 and 1933 he trained at the Naval Academy Mürwik.

In 1933 he was stationed on the cruiser Deutschland, where he was Battery commander. He later served on the Emden, the Schleswig-Holstein, and later on a landbased assignment in Pillau until 1940.

In April 1940 Bülow transferred to the U-boat service, and completed his training on 11 November 1940. He was posted as commander of the U-3 in the 21st U-boat Flotilla. On 6 August 1941 he took command of U-404 in the 6th U-boat Flotilla. He sank 15 ships whilst in U-404, including a Royal Navy destroyer (HMS Veteran), and damaged 2 other ships. He received the Knight's Cross on 20 October 1942, and in April, 1943, the Knight's Cross with Oak Leaves for the assumed sinking of USS Ranger. On 1 September 1943 he was reassigned as commander of the 23rd U-boat Flotilla based in Danzig.

In May 1945, Bülow was taken prisoner by the British, and was released in August of that year. In 1956 he joined the Bundeswehr and was the garrison chief of Bremerhaven. He received command of the German Destroyer Z-6 in 1962. In 1963, he became commander of the 3rd Destroyer Squadron. Before he retired in 1970 he was the garrison chief of Hamburg for five years. He died in Wohltorf.

== Summary of career ==
=== Awards ===
- Iron Cross (1939) 2nd Class (6 April 1942) & 1st Class (6 April 1942)
- Wehrmacht Long Service Award 4th Class
- U-boat War Badge (1939) with Diamonds (April 1943)
- Knight's Cross of the Iron Cross with Oak Leaves
  - Knight's Cross on 20 October 1942 as Kapitänleutnant and commander of U-404
  - 234th Oak Leaves on 26 April 1943 as Kapitänleutnant and commander of U-404
- War Merit Cross 2nd Class (20 April 1944)
- Officer's Cross, Order of Merit of the Federal Republic of Germany

=== Ranks achieved ===
- Kriegsmarine: Korvettenkapitän (Corvette Captain), effective as of 1 June 1943
- Bundesmarine: Kapitän zur See (Captain at Sea) on 1 October 1962

Military offices
Preceded by Kapitänleutnant Helmut Franzke	Commanding officer, U-3; 11 November 1940 – 2 July 1941	Succeeded by Kapitänleutnant Hans-Hartwig Trojer
First	Commanding officer, U-404; 11 November 1940 – 2 July 1941	Succeeded by Kapitänleutnant Adolf Schönberg
First	Commanding officer, U-2545; 11 November 1940 – 2 July 1941	Succeeded by Kapitänleutnant Hans-Bruno Freiherr von Müffling
First	Commanding officer, Marinesturmbataillon 1; 11 November 1940 – 2 July 1941	POW
Preceded by —	Commander of German destroyer Z-6 (formerly USS Charles Ausburne); April 1960 – January 1962	Succeeded by Fregattenkapitän Reeder
