= 7th U-boat Flotilla =

- Active: 25 June 1938–1944
- Country: Nazi Germany
- Branch: Kriegsmarine
- Type: U-boat flotilla
- Garrison/HQ: Kiel, St. Nazaire
- Nickname: Wegener Flotilla

Commanders
- Notable commanders: Korvettenkapitän Hans-Rudolf Rösing; Korvettenkapitän Adolf Piening

The 7th U-boat Flotilla (German 7. Unterseebootsflottille), also referred to as the Wegener Flotilla, was a combat unit within the Kriegsmarine, the naval warfare branch of Nazi Germany. It was the seventh operational flotilla focused on U-boat activities.

Founded on 25 June 1938 under the command of Korvettenkapitän Werner Sobe, it was named in honour of Kapitänleutnant Bernd Wegener. Wegener, a U-boat commander during World War I, died on 19 August 1915 after his submarine U-27 was sunk by British Q-ship HMS Baralong, which was itself a much disputed battle with the Royal Navy accused of war crimes by the German Navy.

According to historical records, the "Wegener Flotilla" was established in Kiel, Germany in June 1938. In September 1940, the flotilla relocated from Kiel to St. Nazaire in France and was subsequently renamed the "7th U-boat Flotilla".

During World War II, the "snorting bull" emblem, which was based on a picture from a comic book and was first used by U-47 gained notoriety as one of the most well-known emblems. The emblem was later adopted by the flotilla when it was stationed in St. Nazaire. U-47 was famous for sinking the British HMS Royal Oak in October 1939.

== Flotilla commanders ==
Duration	Commander
June 1938 – December 1939	Korvkpt. Ernst Sobe
January 1940 – May 1940	Korvkpt. Hans-Rudolf Rösing
May 1940 – September 1940	Kptlt. Herbert Sohler (in deputize)
September 1940 – February 1942	Korvkpt. Herbert Sohler
March 1944 – May 1945	Korvkpt. Adolf Piening

== U-boats assigned to 7. Unterseebootsflottille ==
Type	Number assigned
Type VIIB	19
Type VIIC	89
Type VIIC/41	1
UA (Foreign Boat)	1
