= August 1943 =

Month of 1943

<<	August 1943					>>
Su	Mo	Tu	We	Th	Fr	Sa
1	2	3	4	5	6	7
8	9	10	11	12	13	14
15	16	17	18	19	20	21
22	23	24	25	26	27	28
29	30	31

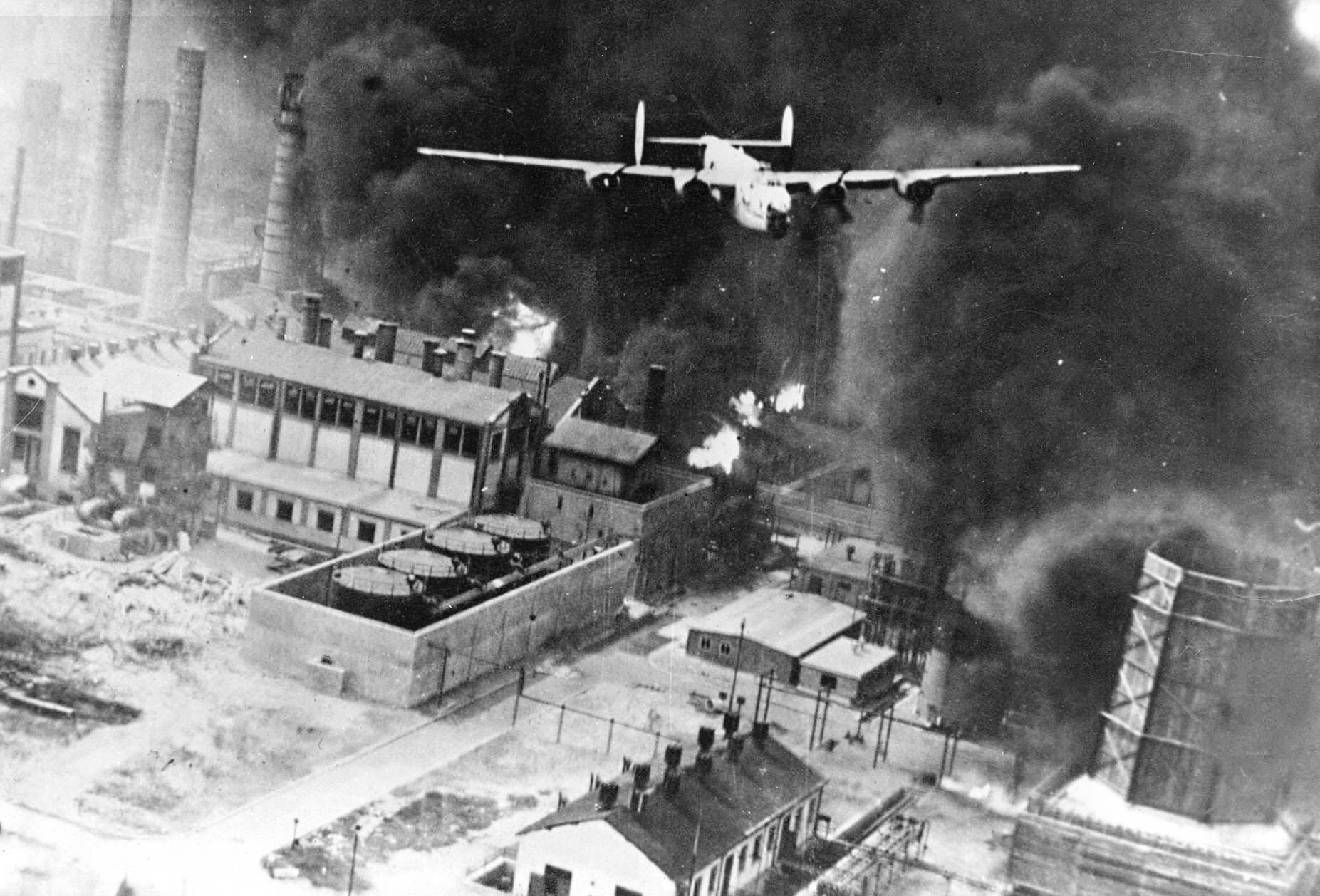
August 1, 1943: American B-24s carry out first bombing of German oil production

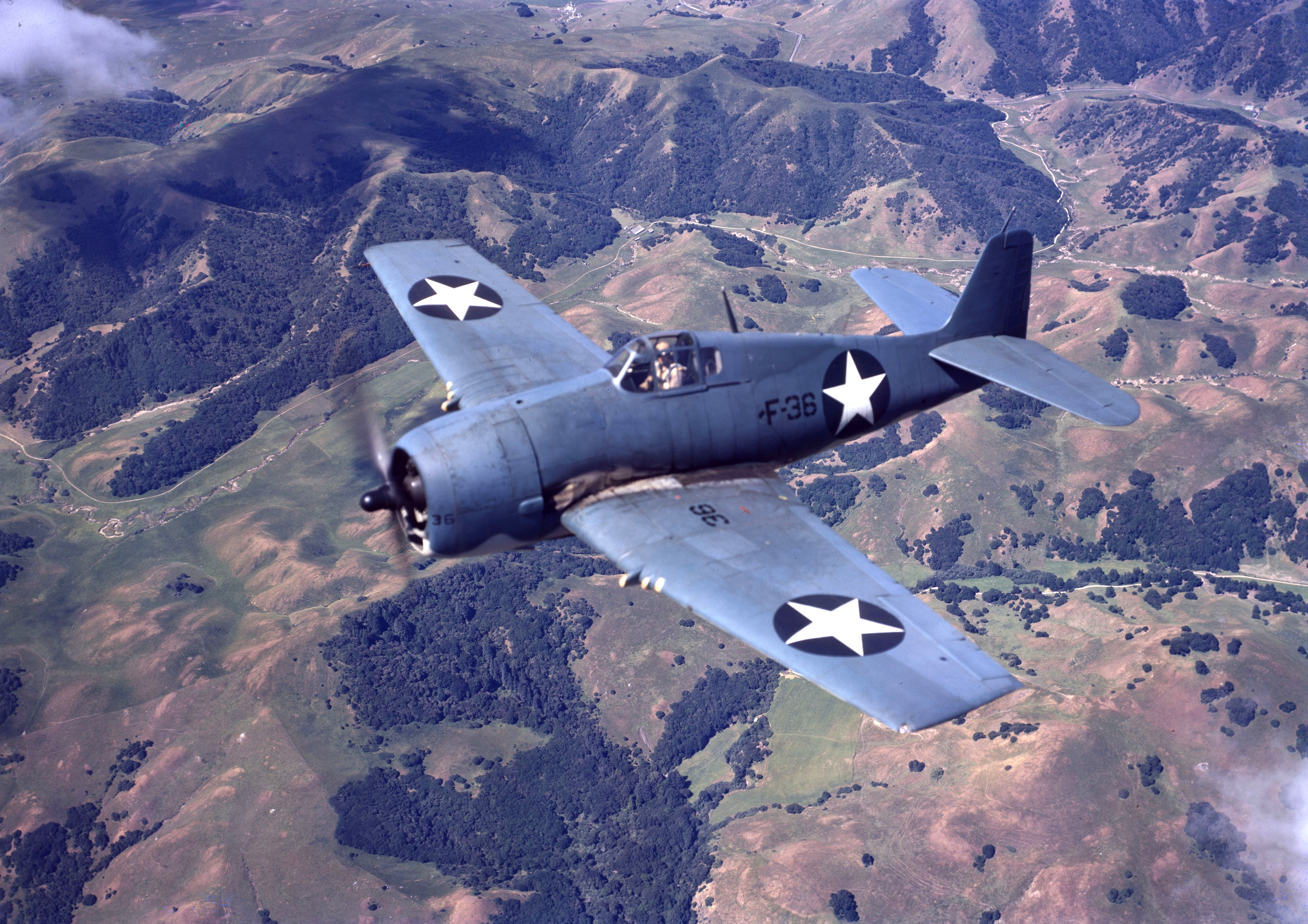
August 31, 1943: The U.S. Navy Hellcat enters the war

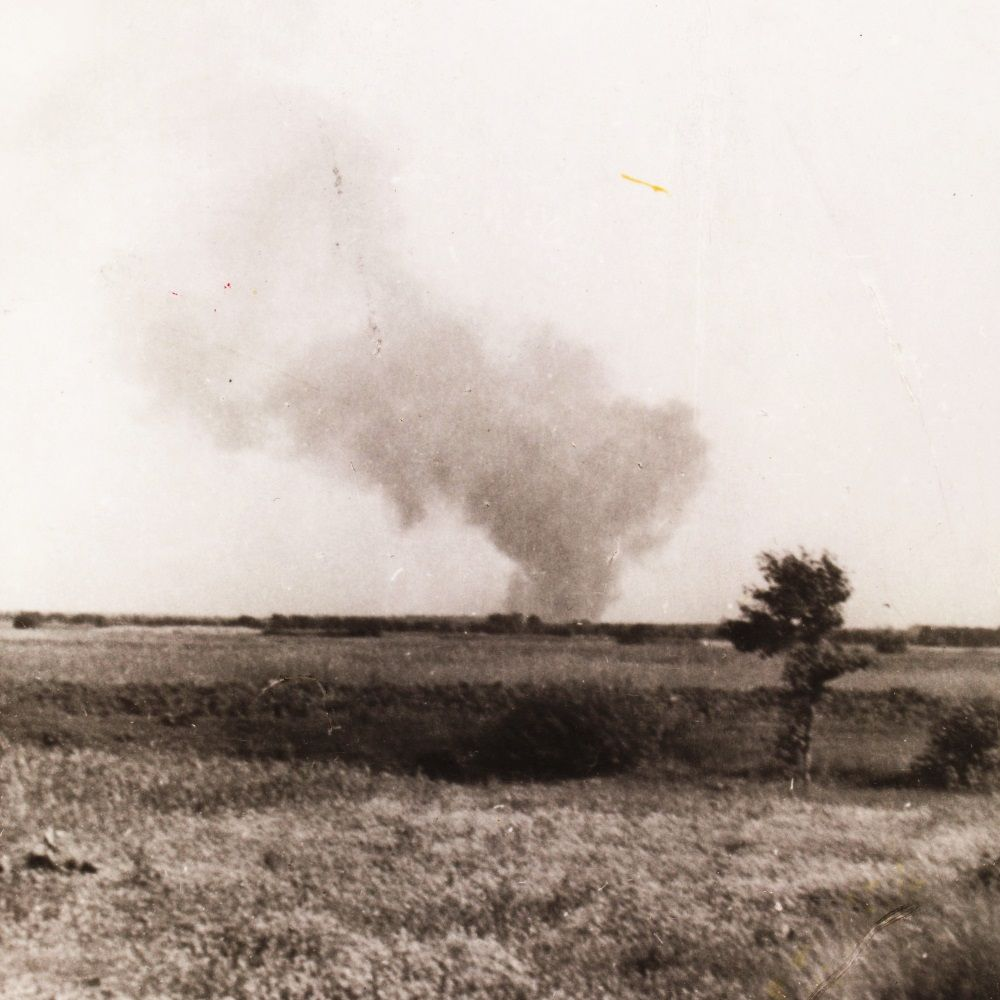
August 2, 1943: Jewish inmates fight back against the Nazis at Treblinka

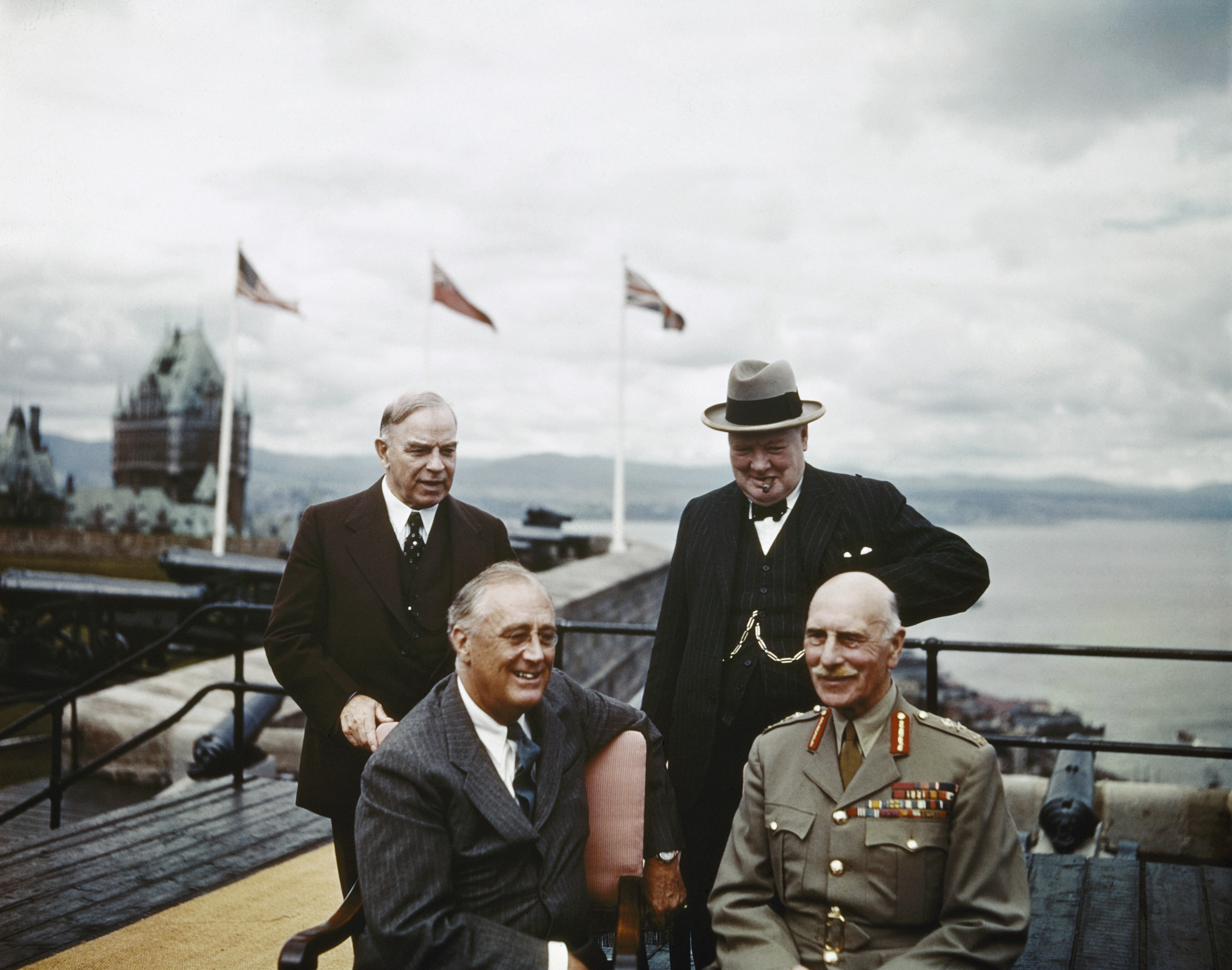
August 17, 1943: President Roosevelt, PMs Churchill and King, and Viceroy Athlone reach secret atomic bomb agreement at Quebec

The following events occurred in August 1943:

== August 1, 1943 (Sunday) ==
- Operation Tidal Wave began as a group of 177 American B-24 Liberator bombers, with 1,726 total crew, departed from Libya to make the first bombing of the oil refineries at Ploieşti, Romania, the major supplier of fuel to Germany. The mission temporarily halted oil production, but 532 airmen and 54 of the planes were lost. After a 40% loss of production, the refineries would be repaired more quickly than projected. Germany's Radio Reconnaissance Service had intercepted and decrypted the Allied messages about the raid and the departure from Libya, and anti-aircraft defenses were in place despite the low-level approach of the bombers.

Flag of the "independent" State of Burma

- Japan granted "independence" to Burma, which had been a British colony at the time of its invasion and occupation by the Japanese Army. Ba Maw was installed as the head of state, (designated the Adipadi), although the commander of the Japanese Army forces in Burma, Lieutenant-General Kawabe Masakazu, would continue to oversee Burma's politics, economy, and foreign relations.
- Rioting broke out in Harlem, the mostly African-American section of New York City, after a white NYPD officer, James Collins, shot a black soldier, Private Robert Bandy, in the shoulder during a scuffle. When an ambulance took Bandy to a hospital, a false rumor spread that the soldier had been killed, and a mob began smashing the windows of pawn shops, liquor stores and other white-owned Harlem businesses. The riot was finally suppressed by black and white NYPD officers, state national guardsmen, and military policemen, along with an appeal from Mayor Fiorello LaGuardia for peace and a delivery of food supplies to Harlem residents. When the riot ended, six African-Americans had died, and more than 500 arrested, while 40 officers had been injured.
- William D. Becker, the Mayor of St. Louis, Missouri, was killed along with nine other people while riding as an honored guest in a new cargo-carrying glider airplane at an airshow at the city's Lambert Field airport. A crowd of 10,000 watched in horror as the wings of the glider buckled as it descended to 2,000 feet, then plummeted to the ground. Killed also were Major William B. Robertson, President of the Robertson Aircraft Corporation, which had built the glider; St. Louis County Judge Executive Henry Mueller; and Thomas Dysart, President of the St. Louis Chamber of Commerce.
- The German submarines U-383 and U-454 were both depth charged and sunk in the Bay of Biscay by Allied aircraft. U-383, which carried at least 44 crew, was never found and U-454 lost 32 of its 46 crew.
- Died:
  - The Blessed Martyrs of Nowogródek, eleven Roman Catholic nuns led by Mother Superior Maria Stella Mardosewicz, were executed by a Nazi firing squad in German-occupied Poland, after volunteering to take the place of local men who had been scheduled for execution. The eleven would be beatified by the Church in 2000.
  - Lydia Litvyak, 21, Soviet fighter ace who shot down at least 11 German airplanes. She is one of two women who were "aces", the other being Yekaterina Budanova, who died on July 19. Litvyak's remains would be found in 1979, and she would be posthumously awarded the medal of Hero of the Soviet Union in 1990.

== August 2, 1943 (Monday) ==
- Jewish inmates at the Treblinka extermination camp in Poland seized weapons from the camp's armory and made plans to take over the concentration camp from their captors. The theft was discovered before the inmates had enough to completely overpower the guards, but hundreds charged through the main gate, and 300 managed to escape. A few guards were killed, and the rebels set several buildings ablaze, though most of the escapees were hunted down and killed, with no more than 40 surviving.

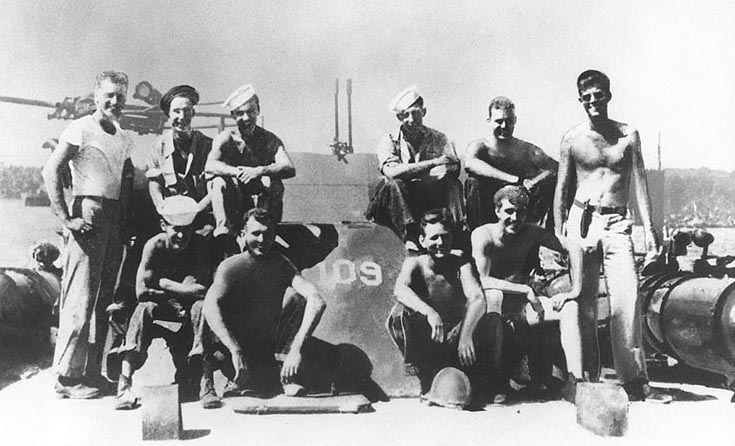
Kennedy (right) and the crew of PT-109

- At 2:00 am local time, the U.S. Navy patrol torpedo boat PT-109, with a crew of 13 commanded by Lieutenant (j.g.) John F. Kennedy, was traveling through the Blackett Strait in the Solomon Islands, when it was rammed and sunk by the Japanese destroyer Amagiri. Though two of the crew were killed, Kennedy and the other ten men swam three miles to a small island and then to Olasana Island, both of which were uninhabited. Kennedy and Ensign George H. R. Ross would make their way to Naru Island where they were found by natives Biuku Gasa and Eroni Kumana who delivered a message that Kennedy had carved on a coconut to the PT base at Rendova Island. The PT-109 survivors were rescued on August 8, and Kennedy received the Navy and Marine Corps Medal for his heroism.
- Soviet partisan fighters began using a new weapon, land mines made of plastic, to fight the German occupiers. Reportedly, the partisans placed 8,422 of the mines along railway tracks in the Belarusian SSR.
- The German submarine U-106 was depth charged and sunk northwest of Cape Ortegal, Spain by Short Sunderland aircraft of No. 228 Squadron RAF, with the loss of 22 of its 48 crew, while the other 26 were rescued by German ships.
- Born: Max Wright, American TV actor who portrayed Willie Tanner on ALF; in Detroit (d. 2019)

== August 3, 1943 (Tuesday) ==
- General George S. Patton was visiting the 15th Evacuation Hospital in Nicosia, Cyprus, when he encountered Private Charles H. Kuhl, who was in the hospital for malaria and dysentery as well as for shell shock. Patton asked Private Kuhl what he was in for, and Kuhl replied, "I guess I just can't take it." Patton lost his temper and struck Kuhl with his gloves. On August 10, Patton would strike another soldier, and the incidents became public knowledge.
- Operation Rumyantsev began as the Soviet Army started an offensive against the German XI Corps to recapture Kharkov.
- The 20-day Mirgorod direction offensive, in which the Soviet Red Army would pursue retreating German Wehrmacht forces after the battle of Kursk, began and marked a turning point in Germany's Eastern Front campaign against the Soviets. When the battle ended on August 23, Germany had failed for the first time to defeat the Soviets in the summer, or to regain losses sustained during the Russian winter.
- The U.S. state of Georgia lowered the legal voting age from 21 to 18, becoming the first state in the union to grant 18-year-olds the right to vote. The amendment to the state constitution was one of 28 that was approved in a referendum.

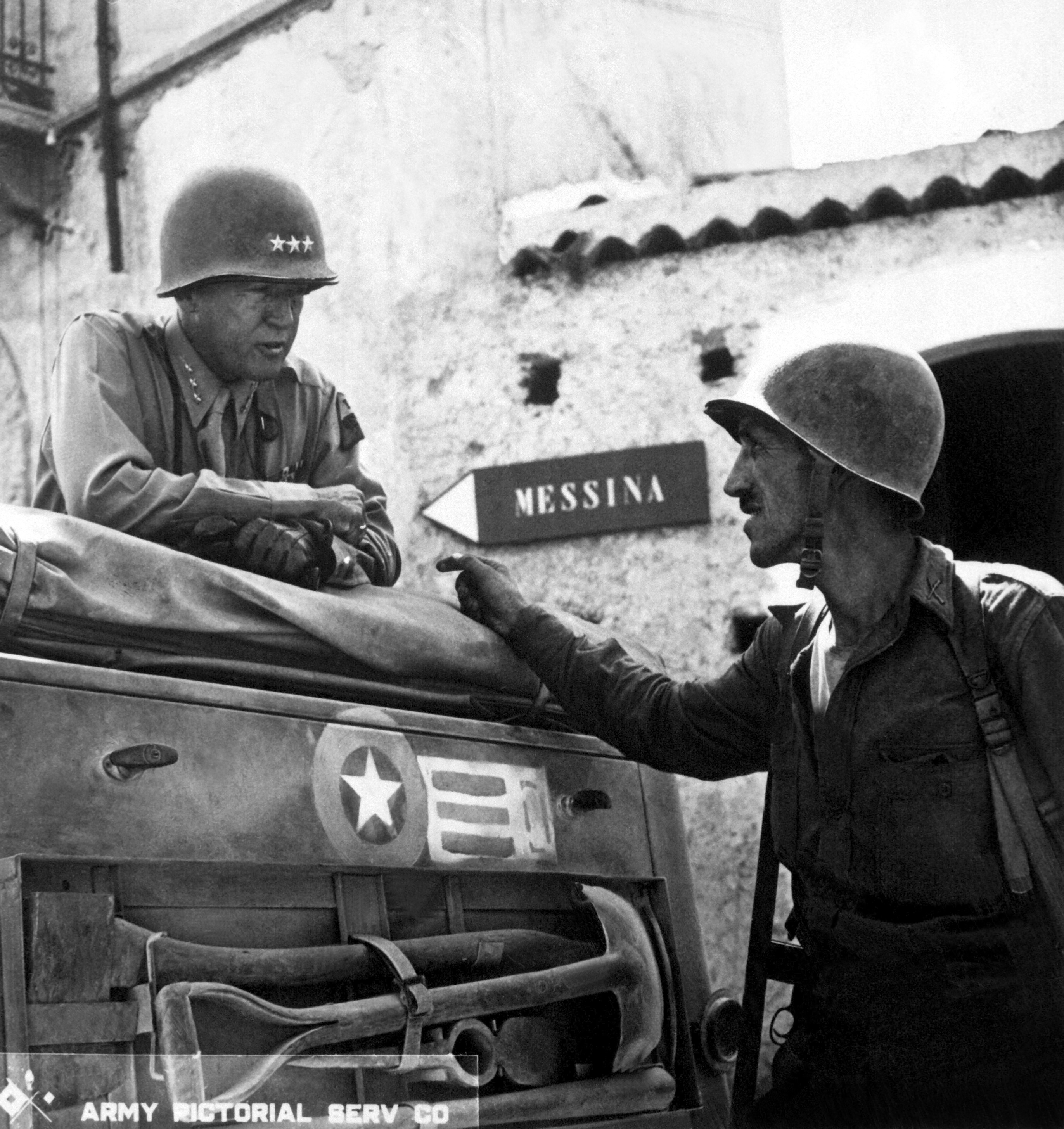
General Patton

- The German submarines U-335 (with 44 crew, of whom one survived), U-572 (with all 47 crew) and U-706 (with a crew of 44) were all lost to Allied action.
- Born:
  - Clarence Wijewardena, Sri Lankan pop musician (d. 1996); in Haputale
  - Steven Millhauser, American novelist known for Martin Dressler: The Tale of an American Dreamer; in New York City

== August 4, 1943 (Wednesday) ==
- British Prime Minister Winston Churchill and his cabinet ministers made what one commentator would call "one of his most important but least known decisions", electing not to ship British wheat to the colony in India, "thereby condemning hundreds of thousands, or possibly millions, of people to death by starvation". At the time, there was a famine in the Bengal province (now Bangladesh).
- At the German V-2 rocket plant at Peenemünde, the decision was made to employ concentration camp inmates as slave labor to build the missiles. For every non-Jewish German employee, there would be at least ten camp inmates supplied by the SS.
- The Battle of Munda Point, fought at New Georgia in the Solomon Islands, ended after five weeks with a U.S. victory over Japan. The Japanese death toll was 4,683 of 8,000 troops killed, while the U.S. sustained 4,994 dead or wounded.
- The German submarine U-489 was depth charged and sunk in the North Atlantic by a Consolidated PBY Catalina of No. 423 Squadron RCAF.
- The Progressive Conservatives under George Drew defeated the Liberal government of Premier Harry Nixon in a provincial election, forming a minority government in Ontario. For the next 42 years, Ontario would be governed without interruption by the Tories. The election was also notable for a breakthrough by the social democratic Co-operative Commonwealth Federation, led by Ted Jolliffe.
- In the port of Algiers, the cargo ship Fort La Montee caught fire and exploded after being towed out to sea. The British destroyer HMS Arrow took heavy damage from the explosion and was later declared a constructive total loss "with many casualties", not otherwise quantified.
- Born:
  - Bjørn Wirkola, Norwegian ski jumper, and winner of two World Championships in 1966; in Alta Municipality
  - Margaret Lee (stage name for Margaret Gwendolyn Box), British-born actress who became a star in Italian action films such as Se tutte le donne del mondo (released in the U.S. as Kiss the Girls and Make Them Die); in Wolverhampton, Staffordshire (d. 2024)

== August 5, 1943 (Thursday) ==
- Soviet troops recaptured the city of Orel from German forces after the 37-day Operation Kutuzov campaign that involved 1.1 million troops (300,700 for the Germans and 800,000 for the Soviets. In reaching their victory, the Soviets suffered 112,529 dead or missing, lost 2,586 tanks and 1,014 aircraft, while the Germans lost 25,515 killed or missing and 60,939 wounded.
- The United States Women Airforce Service Pilots (WASPs) was formed, consolidating the Women's Auxiliary Ferrying Squadron (WAFS) and Women Airforce Service Pilots (WFTD).
- John F. Kennedy and his crewmates from PT-109 were found by two Solomon Islands coastwatchers, Biuku Gasa and Eroni Kumana, who arrived at Nauru in a dugout canoe, and then paddled back to Olasana Island to bring rescuers. Nearly fifty years later, National Geographic News would note that "Without the heroic efforts of two local South Pacific scouts, Lt. John F. Kennedy likely would never have made it to the end of World War II, much less the U.S. Presidency."
- The German submarine U-34 collided at Memel with the submarine tender Lech and sank with the loss of four of 43 crew.
- Jean Monnet of France, best known for creating the Monnet Plan for post-war reconstruction of Europe and for his role in the founding of the European Coal and Steel Community (ECSC), a forerunner of the European Union, told the French Committee for National Liberation in Algiers, the government-in-exile, that "there will be no peace in Europe if the States are reconstituted on the basis of national sovereignty" and that "the countries of Europe are too small to guarantee their peoples the prosperity that modern conditions make possible and consequently necessary".
- Died: Eva-Maria Buch, 22, and Rose Schlösinger, 36, German members of Die Rote Kapelle ("The Red Orchestra"), a resistance group, were executed by guillotine at the Plötzensee Prison in Berlin.

== August 6, 1943 (Friday) ==
- The Battle of Troina in Sicily ended after six days of fighting led by General George S. Patton as American forces triumphed over the Axis defenders and broke through the second Axis line of defense, the Etna Line.
- The two day Battle of Vella Gulf began. The U.S. Navy won the battle, with none of its destroyers lost, while the Japanese destroyers Arashi, Hagikaze and Kawakaze were all sunk and 1,210 troops were killed.
- The Munda Airfield was captured by American forces, giving the United States control of the island of New Georgia.
- The liquidation of the Vilna Ghetto, where the Jewish residents of the city of Vilnius (in Lithuania) had been confined, began. The Nazi occupiers of the Soviet Union removed the first 1,000 of the 50,000 Jewish residents, with 20,000 of the adults transported to Estonia to work as slave labor at the concentration camps in Klooga and Lagedi. The Germans encountered resistance during the first deportation, and after killing those who had taken up arms, sent Estonian Jew Herman Kruk to convince residents that the deportation "meant not extermination but work" Kruk himself would die in the Lagedi camp on September 18, 1944.
- The Battle of Belgorod ended in Soviet victory over the German invaders, while the Germans fell back to Bogodukhov for further fighting.
- U.S. Army Private Walter J. Bohn, convicted of the January 8 rape of a housewife in Alexandria, Louisiana, was hanged at nearby Camp Claiborne after being found guilty of rape by a military court.

== August 7, 1943 (Saturday) ==
- The Second Battle of Smolensk began on the Eastern Front and would last for almost two months with 850,000 German troops against 1,252,600 Soviet troops. The casualty toll, when the fighting ended on October 2 with a Soviet victory, would be 12,984 German troops dead, 51,311 wounded and 6,298 missing in action, while the official Soviet loss was 107,645 killed or missing and 343,821 wounded.
- On the first anniversary of the beginning of the U.S. battle in the south Pacific Ocean against Japanese forces, and almost two years to the day before the bombing of Hiroshima, U.S. Navy Admiral William F. Halsey Jr. told a press conference that "We will destroy the enemy. We shall push forward until the Battle of the South Pacific becomes the Battle of Japan."
- The German submarines U-84 (with all 46 crew), U-117 (with all 52 crew) and U-615 (with 4 of her 47 crew, including the captain) were all sunk in the North Atlantic Ocean by Allied action.

== August 8, 1943 (Sunday) ==
- The United States Army barred the taking of photos at all beach resorts on the Atlantic Ocean, and even painting or sketching beach scenes, as part of defense of the eastern United States. Civilian violators could be barred from the going to the coast, or even subjected to trial in a military court, "for violating or conspiring to violate regulations".
- U.S. troops landed at St. Agata on the Italian island of Sicily.
- The German Kriegsmarine battleships Tirpitz and Scharnhorst along with nine German destroyers, bombarded the settlements of Longyearbyen, Barentsburg and Grumant on the Norwegian island of Spitsbergen.

== August 9, 1943 (Monday) ==
- The United States signed a military assistance treaty with Ethiopia, which had been liberated from control of Italy in 1941.
- The German submarine U-664 was sunk in the Atlantic Ocean by two American Grumman TBM Avenger aircraft from the escort carrier Card. Seven hours after the sinking, 44 of the 51 German crew were rescued by the destroyer USS Borie and taken prisoner.
- Died:
  - Franz Jägerstätter, 36, Austrian farmer and conscientious objector to conscription into the German Army, was executed. He would later be beatified by the Roman Catholic Church in 2007.;
  - Chaïm Soutine, 50, Belarusian-born French expressionist painter, died from a perforated ulcer

== August 10, 1943 (Tuesday) ==
- For the second time in a week, General George S. Patton Jr., struck a U.S. Army soldier after losing his temper. This time, his encounter was with Private Paul G. Bennet at the 93rd Evacuation Hospital in San Stefano, in Sicily. Patton asked Bennet what he was ill with, and Bennet, suffering from shell shock, replied, "It's my nerves... I can't stand the shelling anymore." According to a medical officer who witnessed the attack, General Patton replied, "Your nerves, hell. You're just a God-damned coward, you yellow son of a bitch!" and then slapped him. The second incident was witnessed by a nurse, who told her boyfriend, a U.S. Army Captain in the public affairs detachment for the U.S. Seventh Army, and would make news worldwide when it became public three months later. Although demands would be made by members of Congress for General Patton to be relieved of duty, Patton would instead be reprimanded and would be made to apologize to both soldiers.
- Born:
  - Louis E. Brus, American chemist, recipient of the 2023 Nobel Prize in Chemistry for his co-discovery of quantum dots; in Cleveland.
  - Ronnie Spector (stage name for Veronica Yvette Bennett), American vocalist and leader of The Ronettes; in New York City (d. 2022).

== August 11, 1943 (Wednesday) ==
- Operation Lehrgang, the evacuation of German and Italian troops from Sicily, began with 100,000 Axis troops departing the Italian island over the next seven days, completing by August 17.
- Pulling back from the Soviet Union, Adolf Hitler ordered the creation of the Panther–Wotan line, a line of defense on the eastern side of the Reichskommissariat Ostland, the German-occupied territory in Latvia, Lithuania and Estonia.
- The German submarine U-525 was lost with all 54 crew after being sunk by USS Card and by Allied aircraft, while the submarines U-468 and U-604 were lost to Allied action in the Atlantic Ocean with a rescue of most of their crews.
- The Technicolor comedy film Heaven Can Wait (not related to the 1978 film of the same name), starring Gene Tierney and Don Ameche was released.
- Born:
  - Pervez Musharraf, President of Pakistan from 2001 to 2008; in Delhi, British India (d. 2023)
  - Kenneth Gamble, American songwriter of the Gamble and Huff team that was inducted into the Rock and Roll Hall of Fame in 2008; in Philadelphia
  - Abigail Folger, American heiress who would become one of the seven victims of the 1969 Tate–LaBianca murders; in San Francisco (d. 1969)

== August 12, 1943 (Thursday) ==
- In a recorded radio address that was broadcast to the Philippines on the anniversary of the August 12, 1898 occupation by the United States, U.S. President Roosevelt said that "I give the Filipino people my word that the Republic of the Philippines will be established the moment the power of our Japanese enemies is destroyed." Joaquin Elizalde, the Philippines' Resident Commissioner in Washington, told reporters that he concluded that Roosevelt meant that independence would come sooner than the scheduled independence date of July 4, 1946, although that would require an amendment to the Tydings-McDuffie Act. By the time liberation was declared on July 5, 1945, the transition time would be only a year away.
- Albanian Resistance fighters of the Balli Kombëtar carried out the Kurtez ambush, inflicting heavy losses on German troops.
- The Polish resistance movement Armia Krajowa (the "Home Army") carried out Operation Góral. In a midday raid, the resistance men ambushed a truck and recovered around 106 million złotys being transported in Warsaw by the occupying Nazi German authorities. The amount taken was the equivalent in 1943 of US$33,000,000 .
- The musical horror film Phantom of the Opera starring Nelson Eddy, Susanna Foster and Claude Rains premiered in Los Angeles.

== August 13, 1943 (Friday) ==
- After two weeks of warnings to Italy from the Allies, that "The respite is over. The bombing of military objectives will resume" air raids resumed. Britain's Royal Air Force dropped tons of incendiary bombs on Milan and Turin in the early morning, as well as making the first bombing run on Berlin since May 21. Shortly after 11:00 am local time, American bombers began an even heavier attack on Rome than the one delivered on July 19, and continued for two hours of precision bombing on the railway yards at San Lorenzo and Vittorio. American Liberator bombers struck German Austria for the first time, targeting the Messerschmitt arms plant at Wiener Neustadt south of Vienna, "demonstrating to a bomb-jittery Germany that virtually no corner of its domain is now beyond the range of Allied aircraft".
- The USS John Penn was torpedoed off of Honiara in the Solomon Islands and sunk by Japanese aircraft, with the loss of 98 of her 133 crew.
- Died: Jakob Gapp, 46, Austrian Roman Catholic martyr, was executed at the Plötzensee Prison after being convicted of treason against the Nazi regime. He would receive beatification on November 24, 1996 from Pope John Paul II.

== August 14, 1943 (Saturday) ==
- American Liberator bombers flew a record distance, traveling 2,500 miles (4,000 km) miles from Australia to carry out the first bombing raid on the island of Borneo, striking the Japanese oil reserves at Balikpapan.
- A day after the second bombing of the Italian capital, Rome was declared an open city by the Italian government, which made the announcement in a radio broadcast by Stetani, the official news agency. Marshal Pietro Badoglio, the Italian Prime Minister confirmed the decision later in the day, offering to remove the city's defenses, under the supervision of the Allies, in exchange for no further bombing.
- The Battle of Roosevelt Ridge ended in New Guinea after 24 days, with an Australian and American victory over the Japanese. In all, 2,722 Japanese troops, 343 Australians and 81 Americans were killed in the battle.
- Construction was completed on the 1,811 miles (2,915 km) long Big Inch pipeline, which supplied petroleum directly from the oil fields of East Texas, to the shipping ports of New York City and Philadelphia. The project had started on August 3, 1942.
- The British submarine Saracen was damaged by depth charges from Italian corvettes off Bastia, Corsica and scuttled to prevent capture. Italian ships rescued 46 of the 48 Royal Navy crew.
- The musical comedy film This Is the Army starring George Murphy, Joan Leslie and Ronald Reagan was released.
- Born: Néstor Cerpa Cartolini, Peruvian terrorist who led the Túpac Amaru Revolutionary Movement from 1985 until he was killed in a shootout with police; in Lima (d. 1997)

== August 15, 1943 (Sunday) ==
- United States and Canadian troops, prepared for heavy resistance, invaded the Alaskan island of Kiska and were surprised to find the island deserted. Japan had taken control of Kiska, part of the Alaska Territory, shortly after the 1941 attack on Pearl Harbor. Although there was no resistance, four American soldiers were killed by mines left behind by the Japanese, and 24 were killed by friendly fire, "shot by mistake by their own comrades in the heavy Kiska fog".
- The battle of Vella Lavella began in the Solomon Islands as U.S. troops landed at Barakuma on the Japanese-occupied island of Vella Lavela, and New Zealand troops took over in September. Japanese troops would withdraw on October 6, after which the naval battle would take place.
- A Polish unit of the Uderzeniowe Bataliony Kadrowe conducted the Raid on Mittenheide as an invasion of eastern Germany for reprisal to avenge Nazi German atrocities in Poland's Bialystok District.
- Born: Barbara Bouchet (stage name for Bärbel Gutscher), German-born American and Italian actress and model; in Reichenberg, Sudetenland, Germany (now Liberec in the Czech Republic)

== August 16, 1943 (Monday) ==
- The Białystok Ghetto Uprising began soon after 10:00 in the morning, the German SS surrounded the Jewish ghetto in the city of Białystok in German-occupied Poland, to begin deportation of the thousands of residents to concentration camps. As the roundup began, the Jewish underground force took up arms and began fighting back. The battle went on for five days before the Germans were able to suppress the insurrection. Most of the leaders of the revolt committed suicide rather than being captured.
- Born: Arlene Render, American diplomat who served as the Director of the Office of Central African Affairs within the U.S. State Department, known for attempting to stop the Rwandan genocide; in Cleveland

== August 17, 1943 (Tuesday) ==
- The seven-day Quebec Conference opened in Quebec City in Canada with U.S. President Franklin D. Roosevelt, UK Prime Minister Winston Churchill and Canadian Prime Minister William Lyon Mackenzie King in attendance to discuss the Allied invasion of German-occupied France, initially planned for May 1, 1944.
- The U.S. Army Air Force carried out the Schweinfurt–Regensburg mission, its first strategic air raid on German war production, attacking the ball-bearing factory at Schweinfurt, and the Messerschmitt airplane manufacturing at Regensburg. General Ira C. Eaker, who commanded the Eighth U.S. Army Bomber force, made what Nazi official Albert Speer would later call "a crucial mistake", dividing the 376 American B-17 bombers into two groups, rather than concentrating on destroying the Schweinfurt factory, where production was cut by one-third, but continued. Sixty of the bombers were shot down, and 550 flyers were killed or captured.
- The U.S. 7th Army, commanded by General George S. Patton, met the British 8th Army led by General Bernard Montgomery in Messina, completing the Allied invasion of Sicily.
- Allied artillery in Messina began shelling the Italian mainland.
- The USAAF Fifth Air Force began the five-day Bombing of Wewak on the mainland of New Guinea.
- The naval battle off Horaniu began off of the Solomon Islands began the night and concluded the next day. The Japanese lost four auxiliary ships in the naval battle but successfully evacuated 9,000 troops from Kolombangara.
- Born:
  - Robert De Niro, American film actor and winner of two Academy Awards (for The Godfather Part II and Raging Bull); in New York City
  - Yukio Kasaya, Japanese ski jumper and 1972 Olympic gold medalist; in Yoichi, Hokkaido (d. 2024)

== August 18, 1943 (Wednesday) ==
- In Operation Hydra, three waves of Royal Air Force bombers struck the Nazi German V-2 rocket base and research facility at Peenemünde. Eight RAF bombers were sent toward Berlin to divert German air defenses. General Jeschonnek shot himself the next day after learning about the damage.
- U.S. President Roosevelt issued an Executive Order directing the cancellation of draft deferments for any striking defense plant employees who failed to comply with War Labor Board orders to return to work.
- The Battle of Mount Tambu in New Guinea ended more than a month after its start on July 16, with Australian and U.S. troops succeeding against Japan.
- The last of 46,000 Greek people, mostly Jewish, who had been deported from Salonika, arrived at the Auschwitz extermination camp. Deportation had started on March 20, with 18 transports emptying the Italian-controlled city over five months.
- The German submarine U-403, with 49 crew, was depth charged and sunk in the Atlantic Ocean by a Vickers Wellington of No. 344 Squadron RAF.
- Born: Gianni Rivera, Italian footballer and 1969 European Footballer of the Year; in Alessandria
- Died: German Army Colonel-General Hans Jeschonnek, 44, Chief of Staff of the Luftwaffe, committed suicide after the attack on Peenemünde.

== August 19, 1943 (Thursday) ==
- The Quadrant Conference between the Chiefs of Staff of the United States, the United Kingdom and Canada, continued in Quebec City with the signing of the Quebec Agreement by U.S. President Roosevelt, U.K. Prime Minister Churchill, and Canadian Prime Minister King. The terms of the pact, officially titled Articles of Agreement Governing Collaboration between the Authorities of the USA and the UK in the Matter of Tube Alloys, would remain secret until 1954. "Tube alloys" was a codename for atomic weapons. The nations agreed to combine their atomic physicists and researchers to develop the atomic bomb, and not use the weapon against any other nation without joint consent.
- Secret negotiations began in Lisbon between General Giuseppe Castellano and the Allies to discuss an Italian surrender.
- The Battle of Bobdubi in New Guinea ended almost four months after its April 22 start, as troops from the 15th and 17th Brigades of the Australian Army's 3rd Division Infantry defeated the 51st Division of the Imperial Japanese Army.
- The Japanese submarine I-17, with 91 crew, was sunk off Noumea by the New Zealand minesweeper Tui and American Vought OS2U Kingfisher aircraft. I-17 had been the first Axis ship to attack the continental United States when it fired artillery shells at an oil refinery near Santa Barbara, California, on February 23, 1942.
- A three-story Congoleum Nairn factory, in Kearny, New Jersey, was leveled by a chemical explosion, killing 12 people inside who were buried under tons of rubble.

== August 20, 1943 (Friday) ==
- Japan and Thailand signed a peace treaty, in which four provinces of Japanese-occupied British Malaya (Kedah, Perlis, Kelantan and Trengganu) were to be made part of Thailand. Thai administration would begin on October 18.
- Soviet Major General P. V. Bogdanov, who had collaborated with the enemy after being captured by the German Army, was recaptured and turned over to the Soviet counter-intelligence service, SMERSH. Bogdanov would be executed, along with five other former Red Army generals, on April 19, 1950.
- The German submarine U-197 was sunk with all 67 crew in the Indian Ocean by a PBY Catalina of No. 265 Squadron RAF. On the same day, the German submarine U-670 sank in the Bay of Danzig after a collision with the target ship Bulkoburg with the loss of 21 of U-670s 43 crew.
- Born: Sylvester McCoy (stage name for Percy Kent-Smith ), Scottish TV actor and seventh to play the role of Doctor Who (1987-1989); in Dunoon, Argyll and Bute

== August 21, 1943 (Saturday) ==
- Voters in Australia kept the incumbent government and Prime Minister John Curtin retained his office, as his Australian Labor Party won 49 of the 74 seats in the House of Representatives and 19 of the 36 seats in the Senate
- U.S. President Roosevelt and Canadian Prime Minister King announced jointly from a meeting in Quebec City that their nations' troops had recaptured Kiska, "the last vestige of North American territory of Japanese forces. island of American territory in Alaska. "For security reasons, this announcement has been withheld pending the unloading of transports," the statement said. The recapture of Kiska removed the last base from which Japan could attack the 48 United States, and gave the U.S. a large base from which Japan's home islands could be bombed.
- The Bombing of Wewak ended in U.S. victory.
- Died:
  - Henrik Pontoppidan, 86, Danish novelist and co-winner of the 1917 Nobel Prize for Literature
  - William Lyon Phelps, 78, American author and literary critic nicknamed "Billy Phelps" by his colleagues at Yale University.

== August 22, 1943 (Sunday) ==
- Andrei Gromyko was named as the new Soviet ambassador to the United States, as part of a surprise announcement that longtime ambassador Maxim Litvinov was being removed from the post. Litvinov had departed Washington in May after Joseph Stalin summoned him back to Moscow.
- The identity of "Gertie from Berlin", who broadcast Nazi propaganda to English-speaking radio listeners, was revealed by the FBI to be Gertrude Hahn, an American citizen and native of Pittsburgh. Miss Hahn, who had moved to Berlin in 1938 when her father decided to return the family to Germany, had grown up in Mount Oliver, Pennsylvania.
- The Uniting Islamic Society of America was formed after a four-day meeting in Newark, New Jersey, organized by Sunni Muslims led by Wali Akram.

== August 23, 1943 (Monday) ==
- Premier Joseph Stalin of the Soviet Union announced that the recapture of Kharkov from German occupiers had ended the Battle of Kursk with a serious strategic defeat for the German forces. Kharkov, the fourth largest city in the U.S.S.R., was the last major enemy base on the southern frontier. The Soviet Navy newspaper Red Fleet revealed the discovery of several previously unknown types of German explosive devices that had been left behind by forces fleeing from the Soviets. Some, found in Mtsensk, were time bombs that set to go off as late as 45 days after being set, while others were photo-sensitive, using an "electric eye" to trigger a blast as soon as the mine was brought out of a shadow. Others, discovered in Bryansk were camouflaged to look like swamp plants, or concealed inside chimneys.
- Born: Bobby Diamond, American child actor best known as "Joey" on the TV western Fury; in Los Angeles (d. 2019)
- Born: Rodney Alcala, American serial killer and sex offender; in San Antonio. (d. 2021)

== August 24, 1943 (Tuesday) ==
- The Battle of the Dnieper began on the Eastern Front when Soviet forces began a new offensive to recover the eastern bank of the Dnieper.
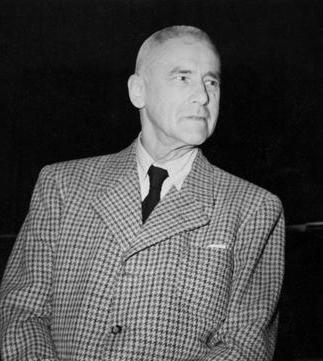
Reichsminister of the Interior Heinrich Himmler and Protectorate Governor Wilhelm Frick
- Heinrich Himmler, the commander of the Gestapo, was named Reichsminister of the Interior in Germany, after Adolf Hitler removed Wilhelm Frick from the post. Frick was reassigned to become the Protector of Bohemia and Moravia, replacing Konstantin von Neurath as Germany's overseer of the "protectorate".
- The Quebec Conference ended.
- The German submarines U-134 (with 48 crew) and U-185 were lost in the Atlantic Ocean to Allied action.
- Died: Simone Weil, 34, French philosopher and feminist activist, died of tuberculosis

== August 25, 1943 (Wednesday) ==
- Lord Mountbatten, Royal Navy Vice-Admiral and leader of the British Commandos in the Pacific War, was named by the Allies as the Supreme Allied Commander of Southeast Asia. Mountbatten would conduct the Allied war effort against Japan in coordination with the Supreme Allied Commander in the Southwest Pacific operations, U.S. Army General Douglas MacArthur.
- The Mirgorod direction offensive ended after 20 days as the Soviets under General Nikolai Vatutin forced the retreat of the Nazi German army of Erich von Manstein.
- Germany used glide bombs for the first time against Allied vessels, but this new weapon's success would be limited.
- The German submarine U-523 was depth charged and sunk west of Vigo in Spain in the Bay of Biscay by the British warships HMS Wanderer and HMS Wallflower, killing 17 of the 54 crew.

== August 26, 1943 (Thursday) ==
- An unprecedented $800,000,000 worth of United States War Bonds were sold as advertising and tickets for an exhibition baseball game that brought out seven of the then twelve living members of the Baseball Hall of Fame, with (Babe Ruth, Walter Johnson, Tris Speaker, Honus Wagner, Eddie Collins, George Sisler, and Connie Mack as the manager) and four more who would be voted in later (Frankie Frisch, Harry Hooper, Roger Bresnahan and umpire Bill Klem). As the "New York All-Stars", also referred to as the "Yanks-Giants-Dodgers" the players beat New Cumberland, a U.S. Army Service team, 5–2. The event, sponsored by the New York Herald-American newspaper, also had entertainment from James Cagney, Ethel Merman, Cab Calloway, Milton Berle, Joe E. Lewis, Carole Landis and Ralph Bellamy. The 800 million dollars was equivalent to 10.7 billion dollars in 2013.
- The Soviet Union and Egypt first established diplomatic relations.
- Died: Ted Ray, 66, British professional golfer who won the British Open in 1912 and the U.S. Open in 1920

== August 27, 1943 (Friday) ==
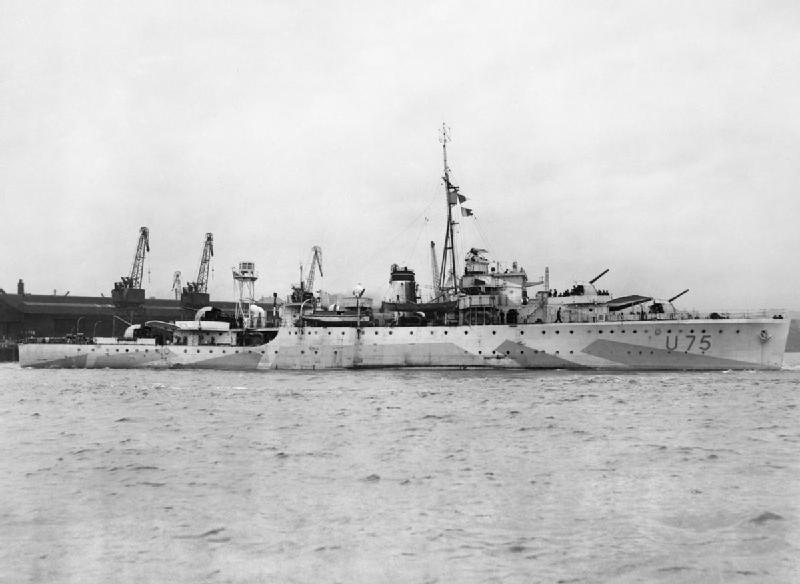
The Hs 293 glide bomb and HMS Egret
- A German Henschel Hs 293 rocket struck, and sank, the British ship HMS Egret, marking the first successful attack by a guided missile.
- The USS Eldridge, was commissioned for the U.S. Navy. The destroyer escort would become part of American folklore as the subject of the supposed Philadelphia Experiment. According to a variation of the legend, the Eldridge was made temporarily invisible.
- Albert Lebrun, who had been President of France at the time of that nation's surrender to Nazi Germany, was arrested by the German Gestapo, while André François-Poncet, the former French ambassador to Germany, was arrested in a separate action.
- The drama film Watch on the Rhine starring Bette Davis and Paul Lukas premiered at the Strand Theatre in New York City.
- Born: Tuesday Weld (stage name for as Susan Ker Weld), American film and TV actress, in New York City

== August 28, 1943 (Saturday) ==
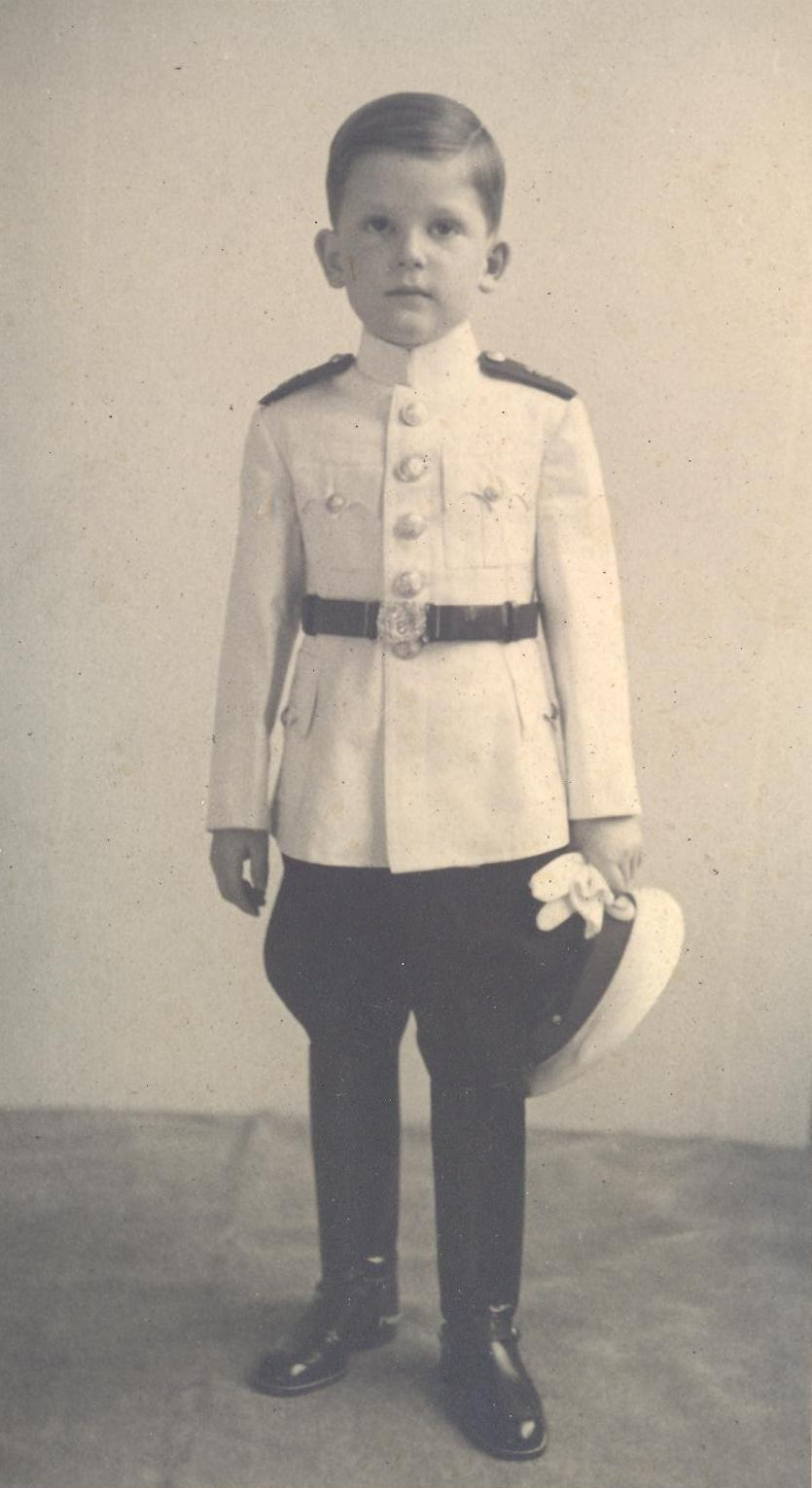
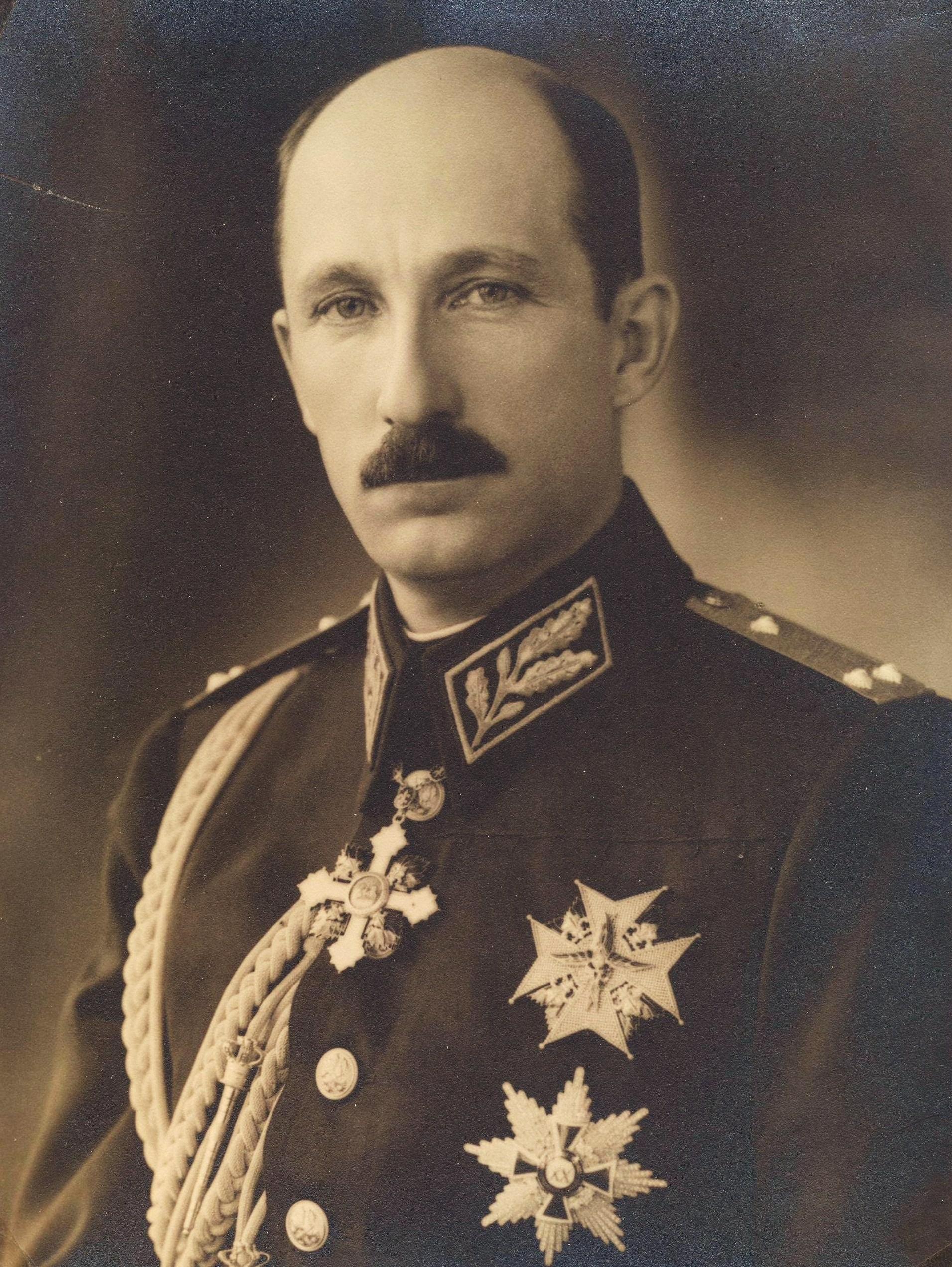
King Simeon II (6) and the late King Boris III
- King Boris III of Bulgaria died at the age of 49, two weeks after his August 14 meeting in Berlin with German Chancellor Adolf Hitler, and only four days after suddenly becoming ill. His 6-year-old son ascended to the throne as Simeon II, with power to be executed by a regency made up of a council of ministers. Simeon II would be the last King of Bulgaria, forced out of office with the abolition of the monarchy on September 8, 1946, but would return to power in 2001 as Simeon Sakskoburggotski, Prime Minister of Bulgaria.
- The Danish government resigned rather than obey a German demand to prosecute suspected saboteurs in German military courts.
- The German submarine U-639 was torpedoed and sunk in the Kara Sea by Soviet submarine S-101, with the loss of all 47 of its crew.
- Born:
  - Surayud Chulanont, Prime Minister of Thailand from 2006 to 2008; in Prachinburi
  - Lou Piniella, American baseball player who was 1969 AL Rookie of the Year, and manager who was named Manager of the Year three times for the Seattle Mariners and the Chicago Cubs; in Tampa
  - David Soul (stage name for David Solberg), American and British TV, film and stage actor known for the TV series Starsky & Hutch and singer known for the #1 hit "Don't Give Up on Us"; in Chicago (d. 2024)

== August 29, 1943 (Sunday) ==
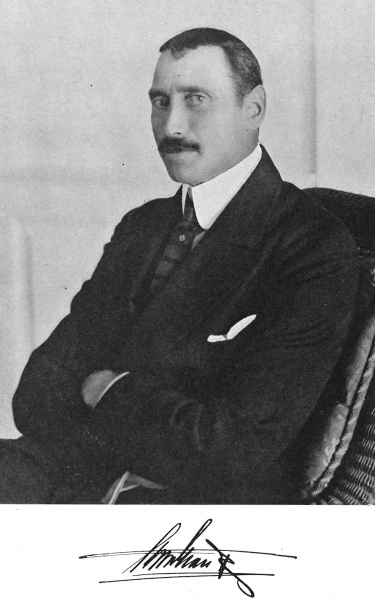
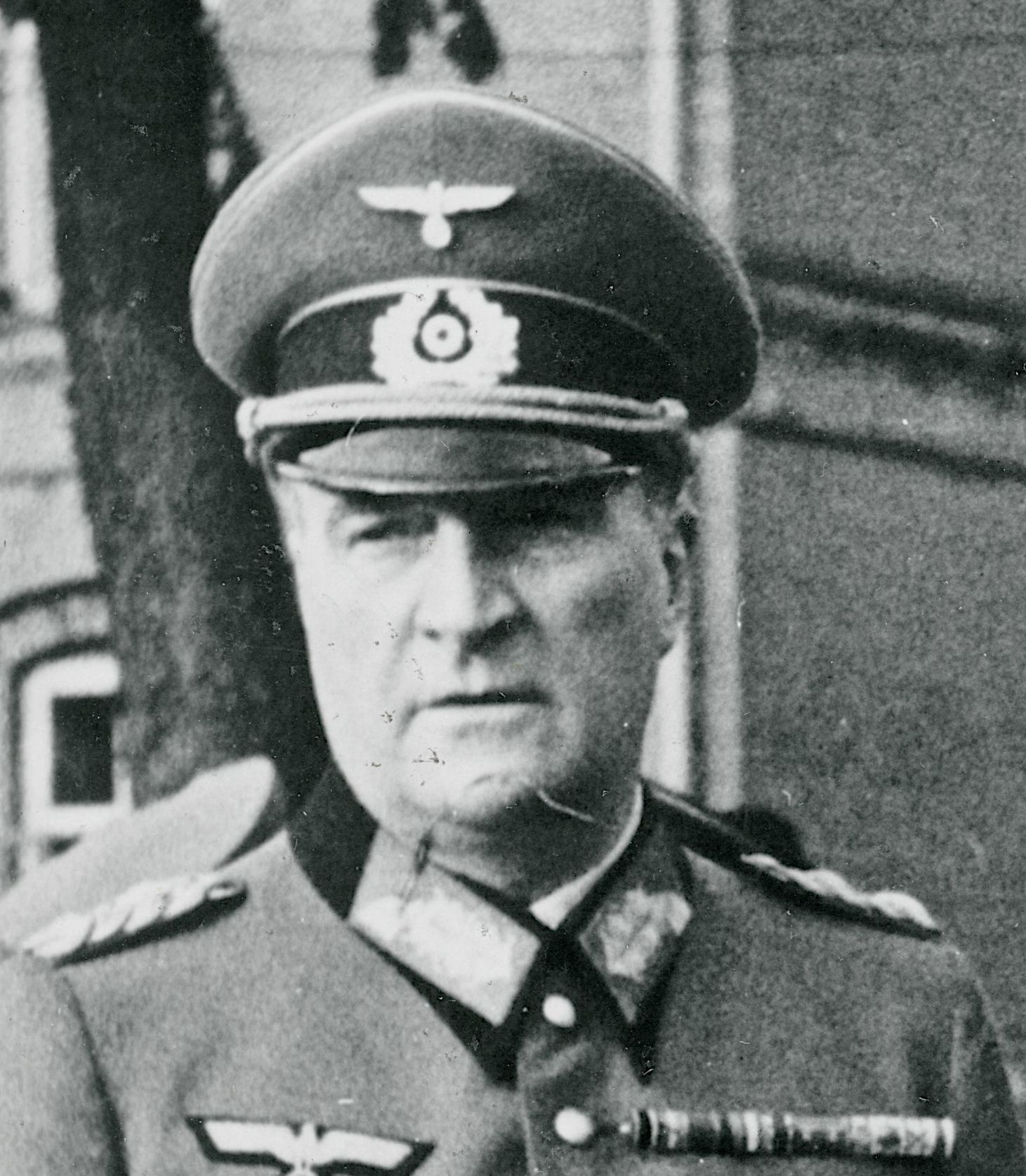
King Christian X of Denmark and Nazi Administrator General Hermann von Hanneken
- As the occupation of Denmark by Germany continued, occupying military forces dissolved the nation's government, which had refused to respond to a wave of strikes and disturbances. King Christian X and Prime Minister Erik Scavenius were placed under arrest, and General Hermann von Hanneken of the German Army declared martial law. After sporadic fights at various barracks, the Danish army was disarmed. Danish crews, mostly at Copenhagen, scuttled thirty-two warships, including the armored defense ship Peder Skram, nine submarines, two new destroyers and two torpedo boats. The other armored cruiser, the Niels Iuel, was sunk by German bombers after Danes took control of it and attempted to take it toward Sweden. Four smaller Danish patrol ships successfully escaped to Sweden and docked at Malmö.
- The Soviet Voronezh Front captured the Ukrainian city of Liubotyn.
- A PV-1 Ventura bomber with a crew of six U.S. Navy members, disappeared after taking off from Whidbey Island NAS on a training flight in the U.S. state of Washington. The Ventura bomber was not discovered until more than 51 years later, when a hiker found the wreckage on the 10,775 feet (3,284 m) high Mount Baker at an altitude of about 7,500 feet (2,300 m).

== August 30, 1943 (Monday) ==
- Twenty-seven people were killed and 46 seriously injured in the collision of a Lackawanna Railroad passenger train and a freight train. Most of the casualties resulted from being scalded by steam and boiling water. The collision took place near Wayland, New York, when the freight engine's crew disregarded signals and pulled into the path of the Buffalo to New York Limited express, which was traveling at 70 miles an hour. Windows on the fifth coach were broken when a steam cylinder on the freight engine burst, sending boiling water onto the passengers inside.
- Germany's Ministry of Transport issued an order banning non-business use of horse-drawn vehicles, confining drivers, horses and carts to "work of war importance".
- The German submarine U-634 was depth charged and sunk east of the Azores by the British warshipsHMS Stork and HMS Stonecrop, with the loss of 47 crew.
- Born:
  - Jean-Claude Killy, French alpine skier, 1968 Olympic gold medalist and 1966 and 1968 world champion; in Saint-Cloud, Seine-et-Oise département
  - Robert Crumb, American cartoonist who founded the "underground comix" movement under the name "R. Crumb"; in Philadelphia
  - Tal Brody, American-born college basketball player who bypassed the NBA to later become a star for Maccabi Tel Aviv in Israel; in Trenton, New Jersey
  - Altovise Davis, American entertainer and third wife of Sammy Davis Jr.; in Charlotte, North Carolina (d. 2009)

== August 31, 1943 (Tuesday) ==
- The Grumman F6F Hellcat fighter was first used in combat, as groups of Hellcats took off from the aircraft carriers Yorktown, Independence, and Essex. One historian would later opine that "The introduction of the Hellcat may have been the most important event of the Pacific war"., while another would give the statistics supporting the opinion. "Of the 6,477 Japanese aircraft U.S. Navy carrier pilots claimed to have destroyed in the air, the Hellcat was responsible for 4,947 — an incredible feat considering the Hellcat did not enter combat service until August 31, 1943."
- A great force of R.A.F.bombers carried out a devastating attack on Berlin with 613 bombers, of which 47 were lost. The attack lasted 45 minutes and 1000 tons of bombs were dropped.
- Died: Gustav Bachmann, 83, German World War I admiral
