= Mirgorod direction offensive =

- Part of the Eastern Front of World War II
Date	3 August 1943 – 25 August 1943
Location	Okhtyrka
Result	Soviet victory

Belligerents
Germany	Soviet Union

Commanders and leaders
(Nazi Germany) Erich von Manstein	(Soviet Union) Nikolai Vatutin

Strength
Army Group South, 4th Panzerarmee, XLVIII Panzercorps, LII Armeecorps, 90 Tanks	Voronezh Front, 1st Guards Tank Army, 40th Army, 27th Army, 6th Guards Army, 600 Tanks

Casualties and losses
	400 Tanks

The Mirgorod direction offensive (3 August 1943 – 23 August 1943) was an operation conducted as part of Operation Polkovodets Rumyantsev between the Red Army and Wehrmacht forces in World War II. It was one of the operations that followed the Battle of Kursk. In the offensive, the Red Army pushed through the Wehrmacht lines after the Wehrmacht retreated after the Battle of Kursk. It represented a turning point on the Eastern Front.

== Prelude ==
During the Battle of Kursk, German armored units south of the Kursk salient failed to penetrate the defences between the Voronezh and Steppe Fronts in the Belgorod sector on 8 July. The Red Army's Belgorod-Kharkov Strategic Counter-Offensive followed Operation Citadel and included as its objectives the immediate liberation of Belgorod and Kharkiv, assigned to the Voronezh and Steppe Fronts. On 23 July 1943, German forces of the XLVIII Panzercorps and LII Armeecorps returned to their old, well fortified positions, stretching to some 60 kilometres west of Tomarovka. Their combat strength had been reduced by as much as 50% following the Battle.

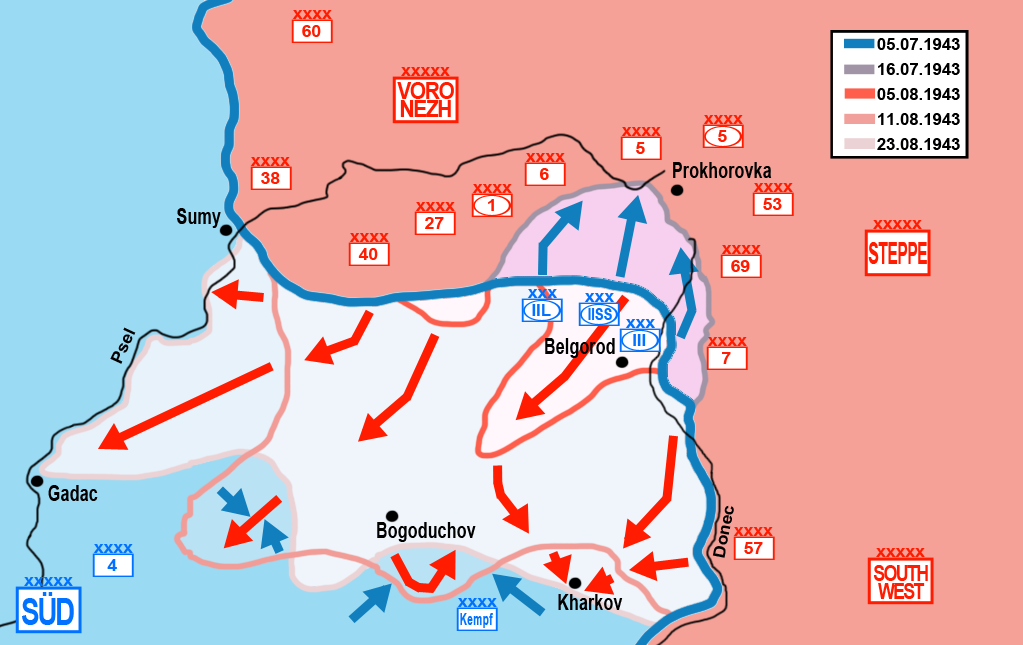
Advance towards Hadiach (Gadac) and Mirgorod beyond.

== The Battle ==
Early on 3 August 1943, after a heavy Artillery barrage which lasted 2 1/2 hours and overwhelming Soviet air support, the Forces of the Voronezh and Steppe Fronts ^{a} from the Kursk-Belgorod highway began advancing on a wide front between Sumy and Vovchansk (175 km), crossed the Vorskla river and quickly penetrated the defences of the 332nd Infantry Division (north of Tomarovka) and 167th Infantry Division to a depth of 100 km^{b} between Tomarovka and Belgorod on the northern flank, and as far as Okhtyrka.
West of Belgorod 6th Panzer Division deployed hurriedly and counter-attacked the penetration in the 167th Infantry Division area but was unable to halt the Soviet flood. Schwere Panzer-Abteilung 502 and 19th Panzer Division were also swept aside by the strength of the attack.^{c} These divisions were good quality units and not badly understrength for this period of the war on the Eastern Front, but the enormous weight of Soviet firepower, mass of infantry and hundreds of tanks simply overran them.

In Tomarovka German units threatened with encirclement retreated along a narrow corridor to Grayvoron. The shattered formations of LII Armeecorps began a harrowing fight through the Russians toward the southwest and their own lines, desperately searching for a gap in the quickly closing noose. All the while Soviet aircraft were descending upon the retreating columns, wreaking confusion and destruction. To counter the breakthrough at the boundary of his armies Manstein gathered his armour from all other areas. By 5 August 1943 the 4 divisions^{d} of the III Panzercorps were deploying north and west of Kharkiv to counterattack the eastern flank of the Russian armoured spearheads driving towards Bohodukhiv.

At the same time 4th Panzerarmee's XXIV Panzercorps prepared to attack the western flank with Großdeutschland Panzergrenadier Division. Manstein planned to use his panzer divisions to slice through the communication lines of the lead Soviet mobile units and destroy their momentum. The Russian armoured forces advanced so quickly to the south, that their rifle divisions were left behind, first due to a lack of enough transport, and secondly to deal with the task of reducing pockets of resistance in rear areas. This left them vulnerable to isolation and destruction by the superior German mobile forces. Despite deep penetrations, forces of the Voronezh Front had been frustrated along the banks of the Vorskla and Merla rivers by German armour operating in a "fire brigade" role which characterised later years. SS armoured units had isolated Soviet units which had penetrated too quickly, and this had halted the momentum of the assault.

To relieve these units and prevent further German advances the 6th Guards, 47th and 40th armies launched an assault on the left flank of 4th Panzerarmee's XLVII Panzercorps ^{e} . General Hoth was now faced with a difficult decision whether to cancel his planned assault to defeat the overextended Soviet armoured formations or to move his armour to relieve his left flank, he made the decision to act aggressively gambling that his assault would force the Soviets to move their forces to counter his threat. On 18 August XXIV Panzercorps ^{f} began its assault toward Parchomovka from Okhtyrka for the moment and achieved quick success by early afternoon of the first day they had penetrated 20 kilometres cutting the communication lines of 27th Army and threatening to encircle the divisions southwest of Okhtyrka. On 20 August 1943 at 1830 hours elements of Großdeutschland linked up with 'Totenkopf' at Parchomovka. The link-up resulted in the tenuous encirclement of several large soviet formations^{g} which were able to escape with heavy vehicle losses and casualties. Increased soviet assaults on the 4th Panzerarmee's left flank over the Psel River by 40th and 47th armies later forced Hoth to withdraw his 10th Panzergrenadier from the counter-attack and finally forced Großdeutschland back to the defensive at Parchomovka.

On 26 August the Soviet Central Front resumed its offensive against Army Group Centre striking the 9th at Karachev and the 2nd German Armies at Sevsk and east of Klintsy securing a deep penetration. This eventually forced Kluge and Manstein to ask permission to withdraw to more secure defensive positions. Retreat to the Dnepr River was now inevitable the only question, would this happen at a time of their choosing or be a headlong flight.^{h}

== Aftermath ==
The constant fighting never allowed Hitler to build up a reserve large enough to regain the upper hand in the east. Employing the peculiar rippling effect that marked its offensives, the Red Army, thwarted in one place, had shifted to others. For the first time in the war it had the full strategic initiative, and it grasped it jealously without regard for economy of effort, tactical sophistication, or the danger of overreaching itself. The failure of "Zitadel" doomed the Germans to the loss of operational initiative on the Eastern Front without any hope of regaining it, although Hitler seems to have been unaware or unwilling to recognizing this reality. The terrible losses in manpower that the Germans suffered in July and August were ultimately fatal and left the armies of Army Group South and Centre too weak to do anything but delay the inevitable. Operation Polkovodets Rumyantsev marked the first time in the war that the Germans were not able to defeat a major Soviet offensive during the summer months and regain their lost ground and the strategic initiative.

== Footnotes ==
- ^{a} Consisting of the 1st Guards Tank Army, 5th Guards Tank Army, 6th Guards Army, 5th Guards Army, 40th Army, 27th Army.
- ^{b} Both belonging to LII Army Corps.
- ^{c} The 19th Panzer Division had only 28 tanks, the 6th Panzer Division which was in reserve and about 7-8 kilometres behind the front had 50 tanks. Both were reinforced by the Schwere Panzer-Abteilung 502 which had 10 operational "Tigers". Thus the entire German tank strength was 90 operational tanks in this sector.
- ^{d} The III Panzercorps comprising the 3rd Panzer Division, the 2nd SS Panzergrenadier Division "Das Reich", the 3rd SS Panzergrenadier Division "Totenkopf" and the 5th SS Panzergrenadier Division "Wiking". The SS divisions were severally weakened after the failure of the 'Kursk Offensive' and more recently "Das Reich" and "Totenkopf" had suffered heavy losses at failed Soviet breakthrough on the Mius river in 6th Armies sector. "Wiking" had also suffered heavy losses at Izium in 8th Armies area.
- ^{e} In the sector of the 57th and 68th Infantry Divisions which were reduced to the strength of "kampfgruppe"'s.
- ^{f} The XXIV Panzercorps comprising the 7th Panzer (40 tanks), 10th Panzergrenadier (40 tanks)& Großdeutschland divisions (70 tanks and assault guns) plus a heavy tank and several assault gun battalions.
- ^{g} The 166th and 71st Rifle divisions and the 4th Guard Tank Corps.
- ^{h} The new 6th Army was also reeling from renewed blows on the Mius River.
