= March 1943 =

Month of 1943

<<	March 1943					>>
Su	Mo	Tu	We	Th	Fr	Sa
	1	2	3	4	5	6
7	8	9	10	11	12	13
14	15	16	17	18	19	20
21	22	23	24	25	26	27
28	29	30	31

The following events occurred in March 1943:

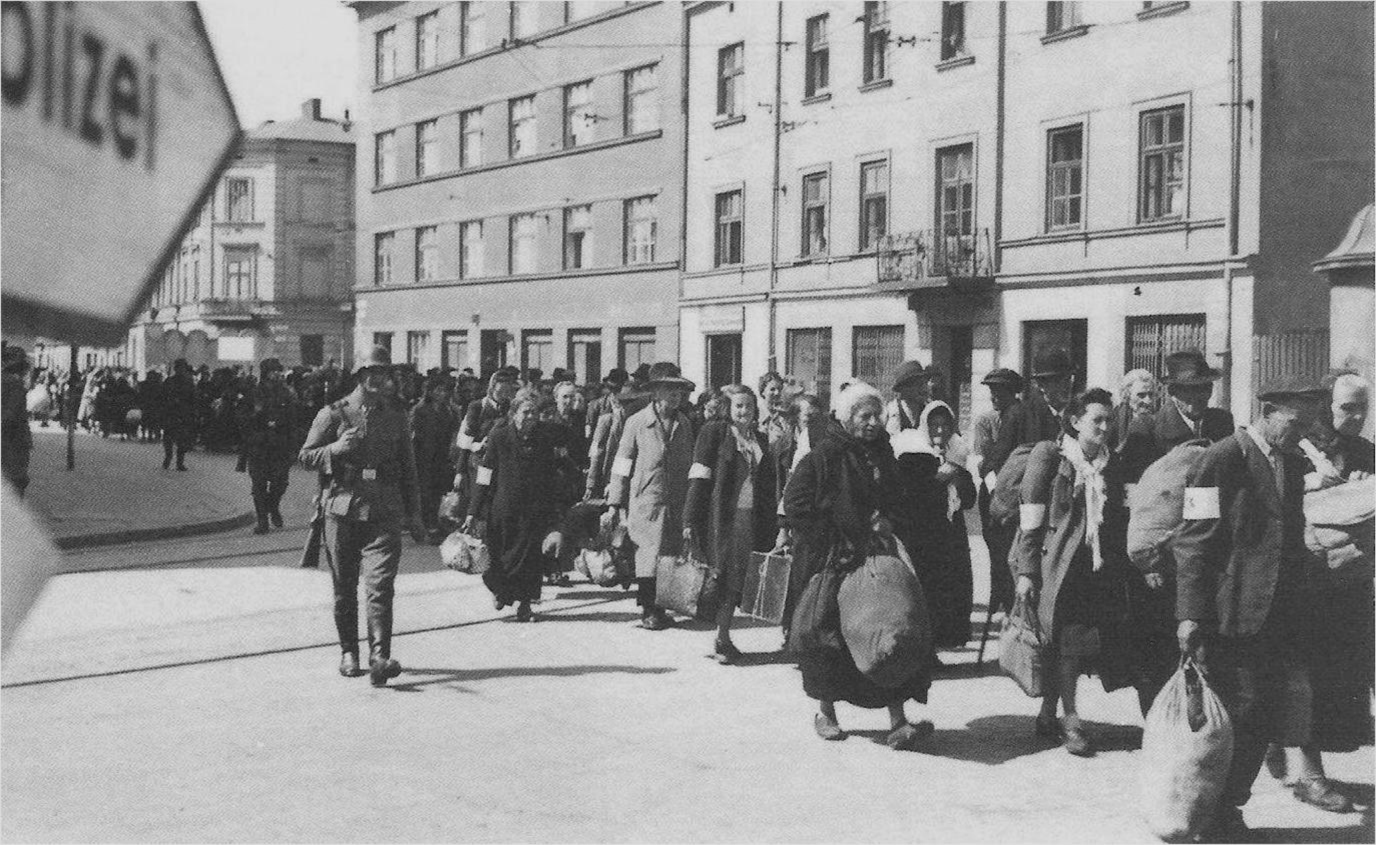
March 13, 1943: Liquidation completed of 10,000 Jews from Krakow Ghetto

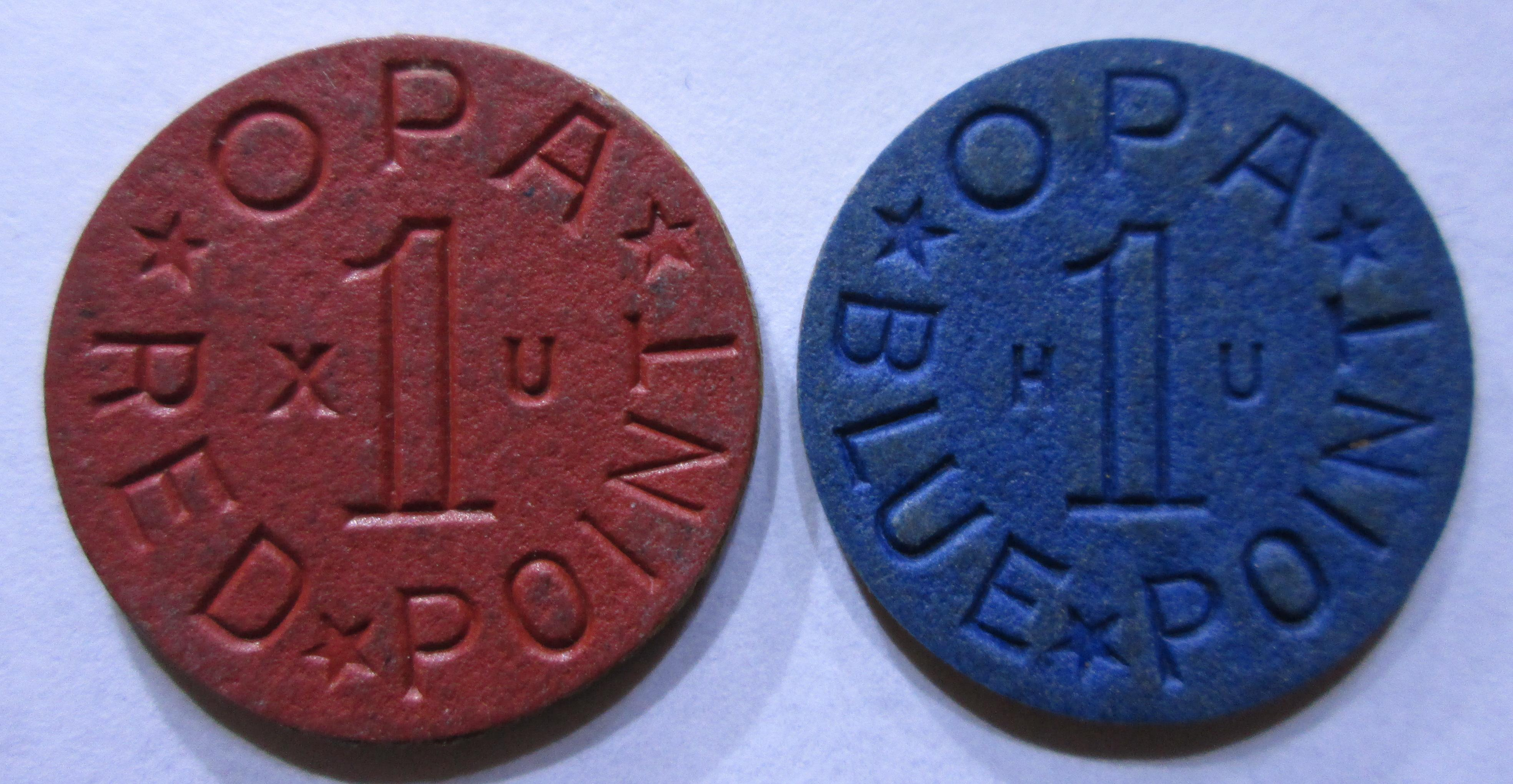
March 1, 1943: First war ration point tokens issued by U.S. government

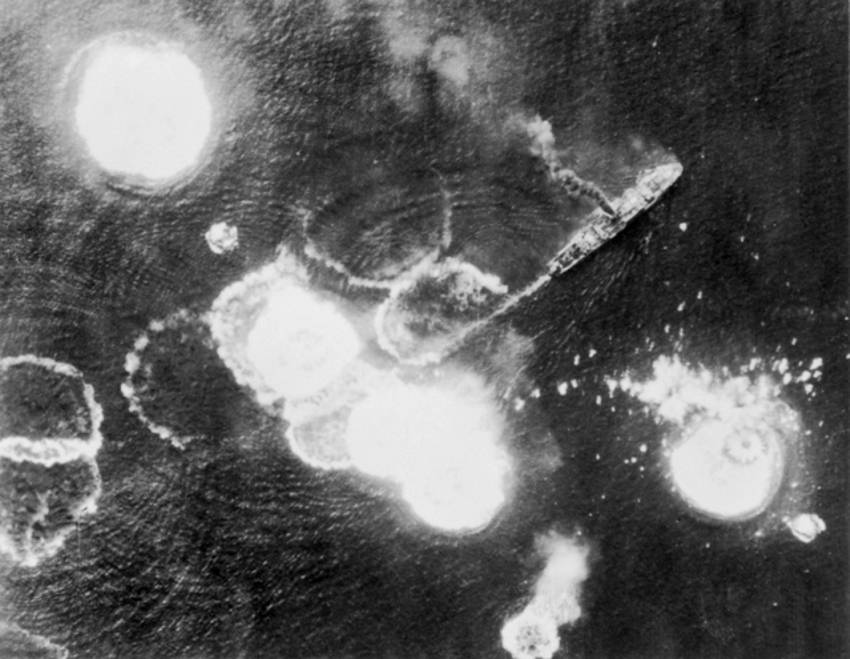
March 2–4, 1943: U.S. and Australian forces sink 12 Japanese Navy ships in battle at Bismarck Sea

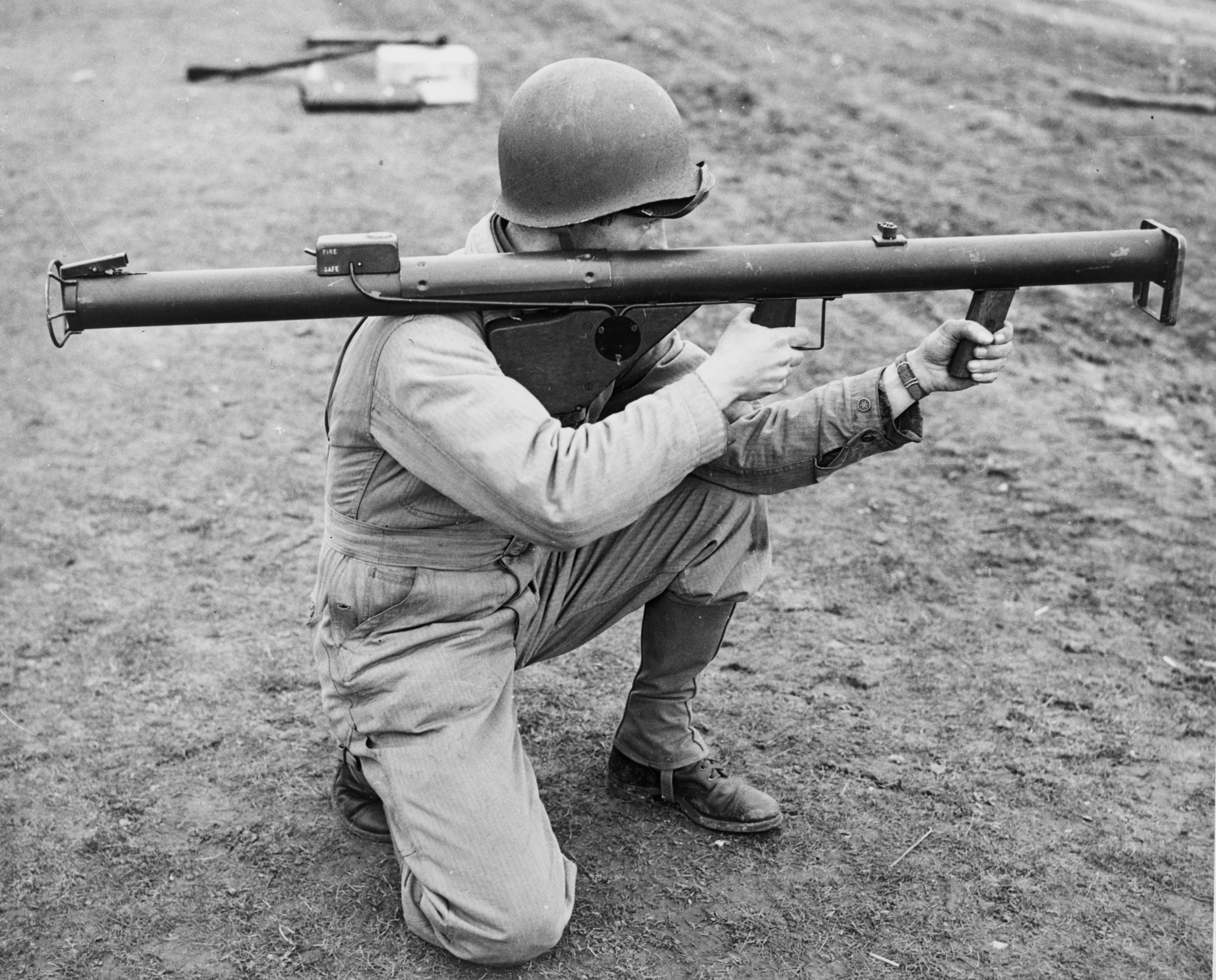
March 27, 1943: U.S. War Department announces the existence of the first rocket-launcher weapon, the bazooka

== March 1, 1943 (Monday) ==
- The U.S. Office of Price Administration implemented rationing of canned goods, which had been barred from retail sale since February 20. Under the new rules, American consumers would be allowed 48 ration points worth, per person, per month of canned and bottled fruits, vegetables, soups, baby food and dehydrated fruit, while canned meats and fish remained unavailable. On the average, the affected canned goods would count for 12 points apiece.
- In the heaviest single air raid on the Nazi German capital, Royal Air Force and U.S. Army Air Force bombers struck Berlin in a 30-minute raid. German radio conceded that at least 89 people were killed and 213 injured. By the end of the week, the radio reported 486 dead and 377 seriously injured.
- The Koriukivka massacre took place in the Ukrainian SSR when the 6,700 residents of the city of Koriukivka, became victims of the German SS. After burning down the buildings in town, the SS troopers killed the survivors.
- Risto Ryti was inaugurated for a second term as President of Finland, and urged citizens to keep fighting for the Axis powers.
- Operation Buffalo (Operation Büffel) began, German forces of Army Group Centre conducted a series of local retreats on the Eastern Front. This movement eliminated the Rzhev Salient and shortened the front line by 230 miles (370 km), releasing 21 divisions.
- The Nazi collaborationist Belarusian Central Council, led by Reichskommissar Hinrich Lohse, was established in what is now Belarus, in the German-occupied Reichskommissariat Ostland.
- Born: Richard H. Price, American physicist; in New York City

== March 2, 1943 (Tuesday) ==
- The Battle of the Bismarck Sea began. U.S. and Australian forces sank a convoy of Japanese ships, taking out all 8 troop transports and 4 escorting destroyers. Nearly 2,900 Japanese servicemen were killed over three days. The convoy had been discovered serendipitously the day before when Lt. Walter Higgins of the U.S. Army descended to a lower altitude while flying over the Pacific in a Liberator bomber.
- In a single day, 1,500 Jewish men, women and children were deported from Berlin after the citywide roundup three days earlier, and sent to the Auschwitz concentration camp; 1,350 of them were executed upon their arrival at Auschwitz.
- The drama film The Human Comedy starring Mickey Rooney was released.
- Born:
  - Peter Straub, American author, in Milwaukee (d. 2022)
  - Elaine Brown, African-American activist, leader of Black Panther Party; in Philadelphia
  - Tony Meehan, British drummer (The Shadows); in Hampstead (d. 2005)

== March 3, 1943 (Wednesday) ==
- A panic during an air raid killed 62 children and 110 adults in London who were trying to enter an air-raid shelter at the underground (subway) station at Bethnal Green, and another 90 were injured. Survivors reported that the stampede was triggered when a woman tripped and fell while descending the stairs, and an elderly man fell over her body, and then 300 more people were caught in the crush. The woman who tripped was rescued, but the baby she had been carrying suffocated. The trigger for the fleeing of residents to the station had been the noise from the launching of British defensive weapons, a salvo of anti-aircraft rockets from Victoria Park.
- The German minelayer Doggerbank was torpedoed and sunk by the German submarine U-43, whose captain mistakenly believed that he was firing at an enemy ship. Captain Hans Joachim Schwantke then ordered U-43 to depart, under orders not to rescue the survivors because of the Laconia incident. Only one of the 365 people on board, Fritz Kuert, survived. Kuert, who had been able to escape safely from three other sinkings of ships, endured for 26 days with almost no food or water, was rescued on March 29 by the Spanish ship Campamor.
- Mohandas K. Gandhi ended his fast after 21 days, drinking a glass of orange juice brought to him in prison by his wife, Kasturba.
- "Why Have I Taken Up the Struggle Against Bolshevism", an open letter by Andrey Vlasov, was published in the newspaper Zarya.
- The Josef von Báky-directed fantasy comedy film Münchhausen premiered in Germany.
- Died: Edward FitzRoy, 73, British Conservative politician and Speaker of the House from 1928 until his death

== March 4, 1943 (Thursday) ==
- As part of the Holocaust in Bulgarian-occupied Greece, almost all Jews in the region were rounded up to be taken to Treblinka extermination camp.
- The 15th Academy Awards ceremony was held in Los Angeles. Mrs. Miniver won Best Picture. Greer Garson won Best Actress and gave what is probably the longest acceptance speech in Academy Awards history at almost six minutes.
- Operation Ochsenkopf ("Ox Head") in Tunisia, launched on February 26 by Germany's Korpsgruppe Weber with 77 tanks and 13,000 men to capture strategic locations, including Majaz al Bab, failed after a battle of six days. Germany lost all but six of its tanks to Britain's V Corps, which had slightly more than 25 tanks.
- The three-day Battle of Fardykambos between Greek partisans and the Royal Italian Army began with an ambush of an Italian transport column that had been preparing to garrison the town of Grevena. At battle's end on March 6, the Greek ELAS liberation fighters had killed 96 Italian soldiers and taken more than 550 as prisoners of war, including commander Perrone Pasconelli, while only three of the partisans were killed.
- The German submarine U-333 shot down a Wellington bomber with anti-aircraft fire directed at the plane's Leigh light, and the U-87 was sunk in the Atlantic Ocean by Canadian warships.
- Born:
  - Lucio Dalla, Italian singer and songwriter known for the song "Caruso"; in Bologna (d. 2012)
  - Zoltan Jeney, Hungarian composer; in Szolnok (d. 2019)

== March 5, 1943 (Friday) ==
- The Allied strategic bombing campaign known as the Battle of the Ruhr began with an opening raid by 412 RAF aircraft on the Krupp munitions factory at Essen. and would continue for almost five months until July 31, 1943. The initial raid killed at least 457 people on the ground, destroyed 53 buildings at the Krupp works, and 160 acres (65 ha) of the center of Essen.
- The Universal Horror film Frankenstein Meets the Wolf Man starring Lon Chaney Jr. and Bela Lugosi was released.
- In Athens and other Greek cities, a general strike and protest march was held against rumours of forced mobilization of Greek workers for work in Germany, resulting in clashes with the Axis occupation forces and collaborationist police. The decree was withdrawn on the next day.
- Born: Lucio Battisti, Italian singer and songwriter; in Poggio Bustone (d. 1998 from cancer)

== March 6, 1943 (Saturday) ==
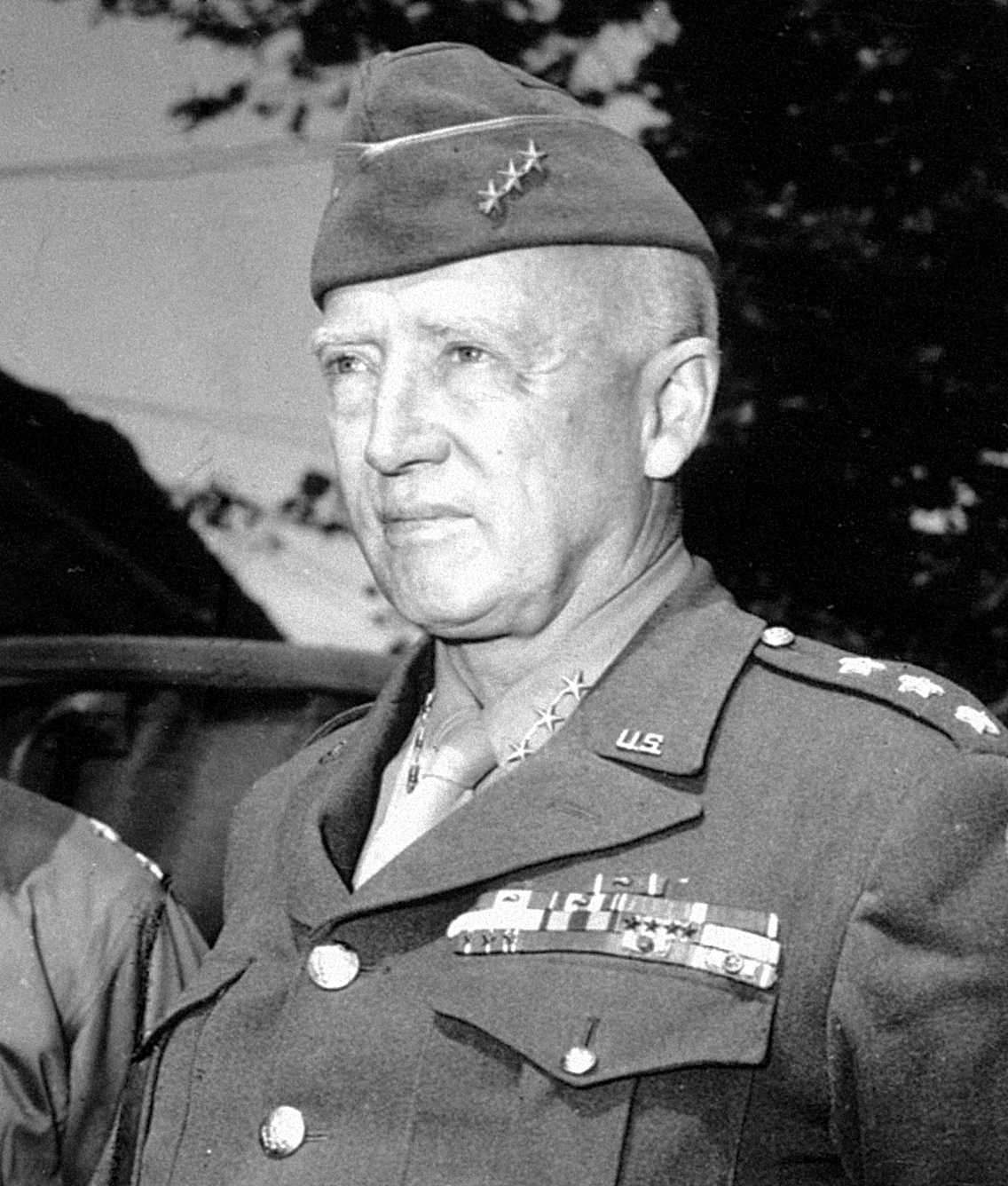
Lt. Gen. George S. Patton Jr.

- Major General George S. Patton Jr. took command of the U.S. Army II Corps, replacing Major General Lloyd Fredendall in the North African campaign and reorganizing the Corps. Patton, "recognized as the Army's foremost expert on tank fighting" was soon promoted to lieutenant general.
- Soviet premier Joseph Stalin promoted himself to the rank of Marshal of the Soviet Union, while the Communist Party proclaimed him to be "the greatest strategist of all times and all peoples".
- The Battle of Blackett Strait was fought in the Pacific at the Solomon Islands as U.S. warships sank the Japanese destroyers Murasame and Minegumo with the loss of 174 Japanese lives. The U.S. submarine Grampus was lost with all crew while en route to the operation.
- The Battle of Medenine was fought in Tunisia, with General Bernard Montgomery leading a force of British, New Zealand and Free French fighters against an offensive by an armoured force of German and Italian fighters led by Erwin Rommel. The Axis lost 41 tanks compared to six by the Allies, and failed to delay Britain's attack on the Mareth Line. General Rommel, who never commanded in North Africa again, withdrew the Axis forces toward the Mareth Line the next day.
- "I've Heard That Song Before" by Harry James and His Orchestra hit #1 on the Billboard singles chart.
- Died: Jimmy Collins, 73, American baseball player elected to the Hall of Fame in 1945

== March 7, 1943 (Sunday) ==
- The Polish government-in-exile reported for the first time about the executions of prisoners in a Nazi German "murder camp" at Oswiecim, known in Germany as Auschwitz.
- Mohammed Ali Jinnah was re-elected as President of the Muslim League in British India.
- Prince Franz Joseph II of Liechtenstein married Countess Georgina von Wilczek. It was the first time that the wedding of a ruling Prince had taken place in Liechtenstein. The monarch of the neutral mountain principality received congratulations from the Allied and the Axis powers.

== March 8, 1943 (Monday) ==
- The Battle of Sokolovo began on the Eastern Front near Kharkiv in the Ukraine, marking the first time that a foreign military unit (the First Czechoslovak Independent Field Battalion), fought alongside the Red Army. The battle ended the next day in a political and moral victory for Czechoslovak forces, who were led by future Czechoslovak President Ludvik Svoboda, who delayed the German advance toward Kharkiv.
- The German submarine U-156, which had torpedoed and sunk the British troopship on September 12 and had sunk 19 merchant ships in 1942, was depth charged and sunk east of Barbados by a Consolidated PBY Catalina of the U.S. Navy.
- The British freighter Guido was torpedoed and sunk by the German submarine U-633 in the North Atlantic south-west of Iceland, in position 58.21N, 31.00W, with 10 of the 45 people on board drowned. U-633 was then sunk by depth charges from the U.S. Coast Guard cutter USCGC Spencer, with the loss of all 43 of the German crew, and the Spencer rescued the survivors of the Guido.
- Born:
  - Lynn Redgrave, English stage and film actress; in Marylebone, London (d. 2010)
  - Susan Clark (stage name for Nora Golding), Canadian TV actress known for the comedy Webster, and an Emmy and Golden Globe Award winner; in Sarnia, Ontario

== March 9, 1943 (Tuesday) ==
- German field marshal Erwin Rommel was summoned back to Berlin and placed on medical leave, on orders of Adolf Hitler, following the failure of the German counterattack at Medenine.
- Şükrü Saracoğlu formed the new government of Turkey, becoming prime minister again.
- French right-wing politician François de La Rocque, who had been a collaborator with the German occupation of France until joining the resistance in 1942, was arrested in Clermont-Ferrand, by the Sicherheitspolizei German police, along with 152 high ranking Parti Social Français members around Vichy France after two meetings with Vichy head of state Philippe Pétain.
- Born:
  - Bobby Fischer, American chess player, World Champion 1972 to 1975; in Chicago (d. 2008)
  - Charles Gibson, American TV news anchorman; in Evanston, Illinois
- Died: Harold James Suggars, 65, "the last of the X-ray martyrs". Suggars had suffered for 41 years from "x-ray dermatitis", a slow and painful deterioration of his skin from his exposure to x-rays while developing radiological devices.

== March 10, 1943 (Wednesday) ==
- The Soviet Union established "Laboratory No. 2", the secret atomic energy research facility, with Igor Kurchatov as the lab's "chief".
- Banco Bradesco, at one time the largest bank in Brazil, was founded by Amador Aguiar in the city of Marília.
- Germany announced new rationing of nonessential goods, prohibiting the manufacture of suits, costumes, bath salts, and firecrackers, and restricting telephone use and photography.
- The comedy film It Ain't Hay starring Abbott and Costello was released.
- Died: Tully Marshall (stage name for William Phillips), 78, American character actor of stage and film

== March 11, 1943 (Thursday) ==
- The Lend-Lease program of aid to the Allies was extended by the United States for another year after President Roosevelt signed legislation into law. Earlier in the day, the U.S. Senate voted 82–0 in favor of the resolution, and the day before, the House had approved it 407–6.
- Inventor John C. Donnelly received acknowledgment for his development of dehydrated foods.
- The entire Jewish population of the Yugoslavian cities of Skopje, Štip and Bitola— all three now part of the Republic of Macedonia— was deported to German's Treblinka II death camp by the German SS with the assistance of Bulgarian soldiers, with 7,240 being shipped out. The day before, the Jewish community in Bitola had been warned by the local Communist Party about the impending raid, though only a few were able to escape.
- The British destroyer HMS Harvester was sunk by the U-432, a German submarine. U-432 was then rammed and sunk by a French ship, the corvette Aconit, which rescued the few survivors of the Harvester. The day before, the Harvester had sunk another German sub, the U-444. There were 41 men lost on U-444, 26 on U-432, and 145 on the Harvester.

== March 12, 1943 (Friday) ==
- The Soviet 5th Army recaptured the Russian city of Vyazma, which had been occupied by German forces since October 7, 1941. According to U.S. journalist Quentin Reynolds in the 1944 book The Curtain Rises, only 716 Russian residents remained in the city that had formerly had a population of 60,000 people.
- The British destroyer HMS Lightning was sunk off Algeria by the German E-boat S-55 with the loss of 45 of its crew of 227.
- The British submarine Turbulent was sunk, probably by a naval mine, off Sardinia with the loss of all 61 crew.
- Italian occupying forces abandoned the Greek town of Karditsa to the partisans of ELAS.
- The village of Tsaritsani, in Greece, was razed by an Italian motorized column. The soldiers burned 360 of the village's 600 houses and shot and killed 40 civilians.
- Aaron Copland's popular Fanfare for the Common Man, written for brass and percussion instruments, was premiered by the Cincinnati Symphony Orchestra.
- Died: Leonidas Harbin, 77, designer and operator of the "incline railway" at Lookout Mountain near Chattanooga, Tennessee

== March 13, 1943 (Saturday) ==
- In a plot called Operation Flash, German officer Henning von Tresckow attempted to assassinate Adolf Hitler by arranging for an unwitting officer to carry a bomb-laden parcel aboard Adolf Hitler's plane. The pretext was that the package contained a gift of liquor. All went according to plan and Hitler's plane took off from Smolensk with the parcel aboard, bound for Rastenburg, but the bomb failed to explode due to a faulty detonator.

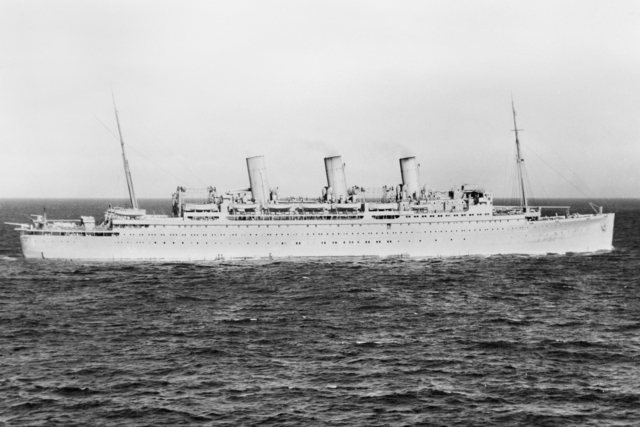
RMS Empress of Canada

- The Canadian Pacific Ocean liner RMS Empress of Canada, converted to war use, was torpedoed and sunk by the Italian submarine Leonardo da Vinci, 400 miles off of the coast of Africa. The ship had been carrying 1,800 people, including Italian servicemen who had been captured as prisoners of war. While 1,400 people survived, 392 were killed, half of them Italian POWs.
- Finland signed a trade agreement with Germany and its Nazi government at Helsinki, with the Nazis providing food to the Finns in what was described by the Axis press as the "traditional Finnish-German spirit of friendship and comradeship in arms".
- The German submarine U-163, which had torpedoed the gunboat USS Erie on November 12, was depth charged and sunk with the loss of all 57 crew in the Atlantic Ocean by the Canadian corvette Prescott. On the same day, the German submarine U-130 was sunk west of the Azores by depth charges from the destroyer USS Hobby with the loss of all 53 crew.
- Born: André Téchiné, French film director; in Valence, Tarn-et-Garonne
- Died:
  - J. P. Morgan Jr., 75, multimillionaire financier and president of J.P. Morgan & Co., Inc.
  - Stephen Vincent Benét, 44, American poet and writer known for the 1928 Pulitzer Prize winning epic poem John Brown's Body, died of a heart attack.

== March 14, 1943 (Sunday) ==
- The final liquidation of the Kraków Ghetto was completed as German SS forces under the command of Untersturmführer Amon Göth removed the last of the 7,000 Jews remaining in the Polish city. The 2,000 Jews deemed able to work were transported to the nearby Plaszow labor camp, while another 2,000 deemed unfit for work were killed by collaborators ("Trawniki men") who had volunteered to assist, and the remaining 6,000 sent to Auschwitz.
- The British submarine HMS Thunderbolt was sunk off Sicily by the Italian corvette Cicogna, killing all 59 crew. On June 1, 1939, as the Thetis, the submarine had been lost during sea trials with all 99 people on board, before being salvaged and relaunched as the Thunderbolt.

== March 15, 1943 (Monday) ==
- The Third Battle of Kharkov ended in the Ukrainian SSR after 24 days of fighting between Germany's Army Group South (commanded by Field Marshal Erich von Manstein) and seven units of the Soviet Red Army. More than 45,000 of the 210,000 Soviet troops were killed, compared to 4,500 German deaths.Glantz & House 1995, p. 296 Although the German Army was successful, the battle would later be described by historian Bevin Alexander as "the last great victory of German arms in the eastern front" and would be followed by German defeat five months later in the largest battle in history, the Battle of Kursk.
- The American submarine USS Triton was shelled, sunk and lost off New Guinea's Kairiru Island by Japanese warships, with the loss of all 74 crew.
- Born:
  - Sly Stone (stage name for Sylvester Stewart) American R & B singer known for the 1968 hit "Everyday People"; in Denton, Texas (d. 2025)
  - David Cronenberg, Canadian horror film director and screenweriter known for Scanners (1981) and other films; in Toronto

== March 16, 1943 (Tuesday) ==
- Soviet leader Joseph Stalin sent a letter to U.S. President Roosevelt urging that a second front be opened in Europe. Stalin wrote, "The Soviet troops have fought strenuously all winter and are continuing to do so, while Hitler is taking important measures to rehabilitate and reinforce his Army for the spring and summer operations against the USSR; it is therefore particularly essential for us that the blow from the West no longer be delayed, that it be delivered this spring or early summer."
- In the largest North Atlantic U-boat "wolfpack" attack of the war against Allied shipping, 22 merchant ships from Convoy HX 229 and Convoy SC 122 (consisting of 90 merchant ships and 16 escort warships) were sunk by a total of 38 U-boats. There were 361 merchant seamen from the convoys killed, with 249 from HX 229, including 80 from the U.S. freighter Harry Luckenbach. HX 229 sustained 112 deaths, including 55 from the British cargo ship SS Clarissa Radcliffe. The German U-boat U-384, with its crew of 49, was the only attacker to be sunk.

== March 17, 1943 (Wednesday) ==
- After the Japanese destroyer Akikaze Maru took 39 Catholic missionaries from Kairiru Island off New Guinea, the order was given for their execution. Over a three-hour period, the missionaries, most of whom were German, were shot to death and their bodies dumped into the ocean.
- Bulgaria, an Axis power allied with Germany, refused to comply with a German demand that Bulgarian Jews be deported to Nazi concentration camps. The Parliament voted unanimously to revoke plans that had been made by government minister Alexander Belev to arrest Bulgaria's Jewish citizens (although deportations had taken place in the conquered territories of Macedonia and Thrace). "As a result of these protests," it was observed, "no Bulgarian Jews were deported to the gas chambers from Bulgaria itself."
- The Washington Bears, an all-black basketball team, defeated the all-white defending champions, the Oshkosh All-Stars, 43–31, to win the fifth annual World Professional Basketball Tournament, before a crowd of 11,000 people in Chicago. The victory completed a season in which the Bears won all 41 of their games.
- Irish Prime Minister Éamon de Valera made the speech "The Ireland That We Dreamed Of" on the Raidió Éireann network on St. Patrick's Day.
- The first research flight for the U.S. National Advisory Committee for Aeronautics (NACA) took place at the Aircraft Engine Research Laboratory (now the Glenn Research Center) in Cleveland, Ohio, using a Martin B-26 Marauder.
- Born: Bakili Muluzi, President of Malawi from 1994 to 2004; in Machinga, Nyasaland (now Malawi).

== March 18, 1943 (Thursday) ==
- German forces eliminated the last pockets of Soviet resistance in Kharkov, thereby completing the reconquest of this Ukrainian SSR city that had been briefly retaken by the Soviet Red Army.
- The pro-Vichy administration in French Guiana was overthrown by a pro-Allied committee.
- Deportation of Jews began from Thrace, which had been added to the Kingdom of Bulgaria after being conquered by German and Bulgarian soldiers, with the first convoy passing through Bulgaria on the way to the Treblinka extermination camp in Poland.

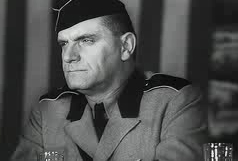
American Nazi leader Kuhn

- Fritz Kuhn, the German born leader of the American Nazi movement, was revoked of his United States citizenship by the U.S. District Court in New York City. Kuhn, who had once led the German American Bund, had been incarcerated at the Clinton Prison at Dannemora, New York, after having been convicted of embezzling the Bund's treasury.
- German police in the town of Köpenick, a suburb of Berlin arrested a petty thief, Bruno Lüdke, after bringing him to the station for questioning in an investigation of the January 31 strangulation of a woman. Lüdke confessed to the crime, as well as the murder of several other victims, while under interrogation and was soon accused of having murdered at least 51 people, mostly women, from 1928 until his apprehension. Never placed on trial and declared legally insane, Lüdke would be sent to a mental institution for experimentation, and die there on April 8, 1944. More than 70 years later, reviewers would conclude not only that the 51 murders showed no similarities, but that Lüdke was unlikely to have committed any of them.
- The drama film Keeper of the Flame starring Spencer Tracy and Katharine Hepburn, was released.
- Born: Kevin Dobson, American TV actor known for portraying Detective Crocker on Kojak; in Jackson Heights, New York (d. 2020)

== March 19, 1943 (Friday) ==
- The Sigurimi, the secret police agency for Albania, was organized by Communist resistance leader Enver Hoxha, initially to gather intelligence in the partisan fight against the Italian occupation forces. After Albania was freed from the Axis powers, Hoxha would use the Sigurimi force to prevent any organized dissent against his regime; the secret police force would be disbanded in 1991.
- The German submarine U-5 sank west of Pillau in a diving accident. Sixteen of her 37 crew were lost.
- The German submarine U-384 was sunk with the loss of all 47 crew west of Malin Head by a B-17 of No. 206 Squadron RAF. Two days earlier, U-384 had torpedoed and sunk the British refrigerated cargo ship Coracero in the attack on Convoy HX 229.
- Born:
  - Mario J. Molina, Mexican chemist, and 1995 Nobel Prize in Chemistry laureate for his work in discovering the threat to the Earth's ozone layer from chlorofluorocarbon (CFC) gases.; in Mexico City (d. 2020)
  - Mario Monti, Prime Minister of Italy from 2011 to 2013; in Varese
- Died: Frank Nitti, 57, Italian-American gangster and enforcer for Al Capone, committed suicide the day before he was scheduled to appear before a grand jury in Chicago.

== March 20, 1943 (Saturday) ==
- The Japanese Navy ordered its submarine forces to leave no survivors on the sinking of any merchant vessels, with the text "Do not stop at the sinking of enemy ships and cargoes. At the same time, carry out the complete destruction of the crews of the enemy's ships."
- The first of 19 transports of 46,000 Greek Jews to Nazi death camps began, as a train left Salonika for the Auschwitz extermination camp. By August 18, the removal of the Jews would be complete.
- Born: Gerard Malanga, American poet and photographer; in the Bronx
- Died: R. Dudley Pope, American inventor who had perfected the parachute for the U.S. armed forces. Pope had been testing his design for a parachute that would open automatically at 2,000 feet, and had leaped from an altitude of 12,000 feet (3,700 m) near Seattle. Pope's invention, and a backup parachute, both failed to open.

== March 21, 1943 (Sunday) ==
- The second attempt on Hitler's life in the space of eight days was made, this time by Rudolf Christoph Freiherr von Gersdorff, who had been given the opportunity to escort Hitler through an exhibition of captured Soviet war equipment at the Zeughaus in Berlin. Gersdorff, who had expected Hitler to spend at least thirty minutes by his side at the Zeughaus, set a ten-minute fuse on a time bomb and made plans to kill himself and Hitler in a suicide bombing. Instead, Hitler rushed through the viewing and left after two minutes; Gersdorff bid his goodbyes, then went into a restroom and defused the explosive.
- The Soviet submarine K-3, which had sunk three German Navy subchasers was depth charged and sunk off Båtsfjord, Norway by three other German submarine chasers, with the loss of all 66 crew.
- Born:
  - Vivian Stanshall, English comedian, writer, artist, broadcaster, and musician; as Victor Stanshall in Oxford (d. 1995)
  - István Gyulai, Hungarian athlete and General Secretary of the International Amateur Athletics Federation (IAAF) from 1991 to 2006; in Budapest (d. 2006).

== March 22, 1943 (Monday) ==
- Deportation began of 4,000 Jews in Nazi-occupied France. The prisoners were sent by train from the Drancy internment camp, near Paris, to the Sobibor extermination camp in Poland, and 1,000 were sent two days later. All but 15 were sent to gas chambers upon their arrival, and only five of the 4,000 survived World War II.
- On the same day, deportation began of the Jews of the Yugoslavian (now Macedonian) city of Skopje, as 2,338 people were loaded onto freight cars for the one-week-long train trip to the Treblinka death camp. Two more transports left on March 29 and April 5, carrying 2,402 and 2,404 Jews respectively.
- The first executions of Gypsies by the Nazi SS were carried out at the Auschwitz concentration camp, with 1,700 being sent to gas chambers after being diagnosed with typhus.
- The Khatyn massacre took place in the Soviet Byelorussian village of Khatyn was attacked by Ukrainian Policemen from the Schutzmannschaft Battalion 118, assisted by German SS troops from 1st Company of the SS-Sonderbataillon Dirlewanger, commanded by SS-Sturmbannführer Praefke. The killings came retaliation for the killing of four German officers from the Schutzmannschaft Battalion 118, including the 32-year old Ordnungspolizei commander Hans Woellke, an Olympic gold medalist who won the shot put competition in the 1936 Games in Berlin. The two units burned down the village and killed 149 of its 156 residents. Only five children and one man survived. A memorial was later placed on the site while the Byelorussian SSR was a republic of the Soviet Union.
- The German submarines U-524 (with 52 crew) and U-665, with more than 44 crew Helgason, Guðmundur. "The Type VIIC boat U-665". German U-boats of WWII uboat.net. were both sunk in the Atlantic Ocean by Allied aircraft, with no survivors.
- Born:
  - Bruno Ganz, Swiss stage and film actor known for starring in Der Untergang as Adolf Hitler; in Zürich (died 2019);
  - Keith Relf, British rock musician and inductee to the Rock and Roll Hall of Fame as the lead vocalist for The Yardbirds; in Richmond, London (accidentally electrocuted, 1976)
- Died: Colonel Edward Orlando Kellett, 40, British MP, big game hunter and Royal Armoured Corps officer, was killed in battle in Tunisia.

== March 23, 1943 (Tuesday) ==
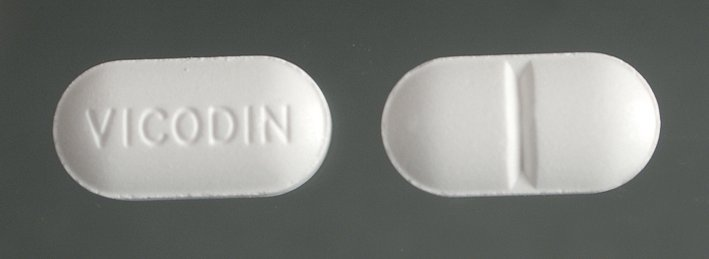
Approved for use

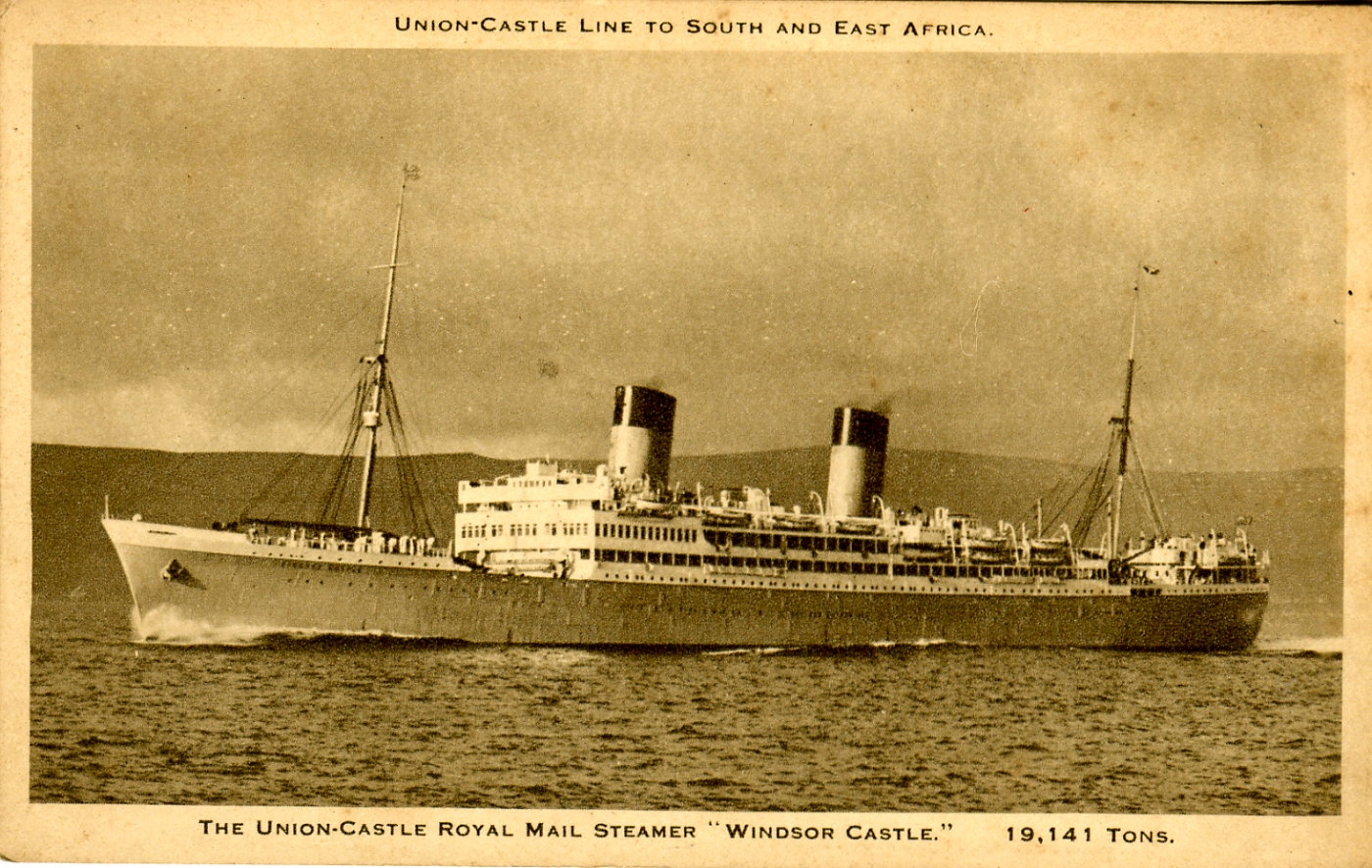
RMS Windsor Castle

- A combination of hydrocodone and acetaminophen, known by various trade names including Vicodin and Lortab, was first approved for use in the United States by the Food and Drug Administration.
- The British troopship RMS Windsor Castle was torpedoed and sunk off Algiers by a German Heinkel He 111 aircraft. With the aid of the Royal Navy destroyers HMS Whaddon, HMS Eggesford, and HMS Douglas, all but one of the 2,700 people on board were rescued before the ship sank.
- Parliamentary elections were allowed in Denmark by Werner Best and the Nazi occupation authorities. The Social Democratic Party won 66 of the 148 seats available, and the Danish Nazi party candidates received only 3.3% of the vote.
- The Xerces Blue butterfly (Glaucopsyche xerces) was seen for the last time, and is presumed to have become extinct, its habitat in the sand dunes near San Francisco Bay having been destroyed by the growth of the California city.
- British Commandos carried out Operation Roundabout, a raid on a bridge over a Norwegian fjord, but the mission was unsuccessful when one of the accompanying Norwegian soldiers dropped the magazine for his machine gun and alerted the German guards.

== March 24, 1943 (Wednesday) ==
- Ata al-Ayyubi was named as the interim president of Syria by the French military administrator, General Georges Catroux, until elections could be held in July.
- Lt. General John L. DeWitt, the U.S. Army administrator overseeing the Japanese American internment, eased restrictions of movement, but issued regulations putting an 8:00 pm to 6:00 am curfew on all people of Japanese ancestry. The curfew would be upheld by the United States Supreme Court in Hirabayashi v. United States, 320 U.S. 81 (1943).
- Died: U.S. Army Colonel H. Weir Cook, 50, American fighter ace, died when his P-39 plane crashed during a mission in New Caledonia. The airport in Indianapolis would later be renamed in his honor.

== March 25, 1943 (Thursday) ==
- German Foreign Minister Joachim von Ribbentrop warned Henrik Ramsay, the visiting Foreign Minister of Finland, that the Nazi regime would not tolerate Finland's withdrawal from the Axis powers, nor any attempt by Finland to negotiate peace terms with the Allied powers.
- The go-ahead for construction of the Blockhaus d'Éperlecques was approved by Adolf Hitler. Located in France near Watten and the English Channel, the "blockhaus" was a hardened bunker with walls 12 feet thick, the first of three constructed to house Germany's V-2 missiles.
- The German submarine U-469 was depth charged and sunk in the Atlantic Ocean by a B-17 of No. 206 Squadron RAF. All 47 of the crew died.
- Born: Paul Michael Glaser, American TV actor known for portraying Michael Starsky in the series Starsky and Hutch, and later a film director of The Running Man and The Cutting Edge; in Cambridge, Massachusetts

== March 26, 1943 (Friday) ==
- The Battle of the Komandorski Islands began in the Aleutian Islands, when United States Navy forces intercepted a convoy of Japanese transports and ships attempting to bring troops to Kiska. The American force of two cruisers and four destroyers was commanded by Rear Admiral Charles H. McMorris, while the Japanese convoy of five destroyers and four cruisers was led by Admiral Boshiro Hosogaya. The two sides fired shells at each other across a distance of no more than eight miles, without the use of submarines or airplanes, in what historian Samuel Eliot Morison described as "a naval battle that has no parallel in the Pacific War". Although no ships were sunk in the four-hour battle, Admiral Hosogaya ordered his fleet to turn back and "no further Japanese convoys were to reach the Aleutians".
- A committee, chaired by U.S. Undersecretary of State Sumner Welles, submitted a proposed charter for a "world security association" to be set up by the world's nations after the end of World War II. The proposal resembled the United Nations Organization that would be created in 1945, with a "General Conference" of all nations, an Executive Committee consisting of the U.S., the U.K., the U.S.S.R. and China, and a middle tier of the four Committee powers and seven other nations representing different regions of the world. The UNO would combine the two committees into one Security Council, with five permanent members given a veto power, and ten non-voting members drawn on a rotating basis from the other members.
- Born: Bob Woodward, American investigative reporter for the Washington Post known, with Carl Bernstein, for linking government officials to the Watergate scandal, and later as the author of 14 bestselling non-fiction books, starting with The Final Days in 1976; in Geneva, Illinois

== March 27, 1943 (Saturday) ==
- The British escort carrier Dasher was destroyed by an accidental explosion in the Firth of Clyde, killing 379 of the crew of 528. An investigation concluded that the cause had been "a carelessly dropped cigarette" that had ignited fuel from a leaking valve on the ship's tanks.
- The U.S. Department of War released the news of a successful new weapon for the U.S. Army, the bazooka. In a statement, the War Department said that "It is revolutionary in design. It can be carted about in a jeep or a peep, or carried by two men at a dog trot. It hurls a high explosive projectile... It will shatter cast steel and such material as bridge girders and railroad rails and perform other seeming miracles. Before long, the 'bazooka' will be heard from on all fronts." The weapon had secretly been demonstrated to news reporters in December, on condition that it could not be written about at the time.
- In the heaviest air raid on the German capital up to that time, 1,000 tons of bombs were dropped on Berlin by Britain's Royal Air Force in three waves of 100 bombers each.
- The German submarine U-169 was depth charged and sunk with all 48 crew in the North Atlantic by a B-17 of No. 206 Squadron RAF.

== March 28, 1943 (Sunday) ==
- At Naples, the munitions ship Caterina Costa exploded in the harbor of the Italian city. Initial reports were that 72 people were killed and 1,179 injured, while later sources set the death toll at 600 or more. The fire on the ship had burned for hours, but no action was taken on fighting the blaze or towing the ship away from the harbor, because government approval could not be obtained to take action.
- Died:
  - Sergei Rachmaninoff, 70, Russian classical composer and U.S. citizen, died from skin cancer.
  - Sundara Sastri Satyamurti, 55, Indian independence activist

== March 29, 1943 (Monday) ==
- Food rationing began in the United States following the March 12 announcement of limits on beef, pork, lamb and mutton, as well as butter, cheese and canned fish. Poultry was not affected by the order.
- The New Zealand 2nd Infantry Division entered the Tunisian city of Gabès.
- Given a choice between placing Germany's new V-2 missiles on mobile rocket launchers or in bunkers near Peenemünde, Adolf Hitler rejected German Army recommendations and opted for the fixed locations for the weapon.
- After being heavily damaged the day before by two British Lockheed Hudson aircraft, the German U-Boat U-77, which had sunk 14 freighters and the Royal Navy warship HMS Grove (at the loss of 110 British crew), was scuttled by its crew after being evacuated by order of its commander, Otto Hartmann. Of its 47 crew, nine were rescued by Spanish fishermen off the coast of Calpe, while the other 38 died from hypothermia.
- Born:
  - John Major, Prime Minister of the United Kingdom from 1990 to 1997; in Sutton and Cheam, London
  - Eric Idle, English comedian and co-founder of the Monty Python comedy group; in South Shields, County Durham (now Tyne and Wear)
  - Vangelis (stage name for Evangelos Papathanassiou), Greek musician and film score composer known for the theme to Chariots of Fire; in Volos (d. 2022)
- Died: Ben Davies, 85, Welsh opera tenor.

== March 30, 1943 (Tuesday) ==
- Near Camden, South Carolina, the men of the 505th Parachute Infantry Regiment bailed out in "the first mass parachute jump" in American history, with 2,000 soldiers in the sky at once.
- The University of Wyoming Cowboys won the eight-team NCAA basketball tournament at Madison Square Garden (1925) in New York City defeating the Georgetown University Hoyas, 46 to 34.
- Died: Sister Maria Restituta, 48, Austrian Roman Catholic nun, was beheaded on orders of Martin Bormann, becoming the only nun in Nazi Germany to receive the death sentence. She would be beatified in 1998.

== March 31, 1943 (Wednesday) ==
- Oklahoma!, the first musical by the team of Richard Rodgers and Oscar Hammerstein II, opened on Broadway at the St. James Theatre for the first of 2,212 performances. Ten years later, Oklahoma! would be described as "a new musical that broke all the rules: it had no big-name stars, no bare-legged chorus and, worst of all, it contained a 'high-brow' ballet.". The show went on to become Broadway's longest-running musical up to that time, closing in 1948.
- In North Africa, Axis forces withdrew from Cap Serrat while 5th Corps of the 1st British Army captured El Aouana.
- Born: Christopher Walken, American stage and film actor, winner of the 1979 Academy Awards for Best Supporting Actor (for The Deer Hunter; as Ronald Walken in Astoria, Queens, New York City
- Died: Pavel Milyukov, 84, Russian Minister of Foreign Affairs for two months in 1917
