= Kluge =

Kluge (English: /ˈkluːɡi/, German: [ˈkluːɡə]) is a German-derived surname. In German, capitalizing, and adding a final -e to, the adjective klug (meaning "clever"), creates a noun meaning "clever one". Although the adjective kluge is a feminine form, the noun Kluge can be feminine, neuter or masculine.

Notable people with the surname include:

- Alexander Kluge (1932–2026), German film director and author
- Alexandra Kluge (1937–2017), German actor
- Arnold G. Kluge (retired 2003), American zoologist and herpetologist
- Eike-Henner Kluge, Canadian German ethicist
- Ewald Kluge (1909–1964), German motorcyclist
- Friedrich Kluge (1856–1926), German linguist
- Günther von Kluge (1882–1944), German field marshal
- Hertha Kluge-Pott (1934–2025), German-born Australian printmaker
- John Werner Kluge (1914–2010), German-American media entrepreneur and philanthropist
- P. F. Kluge (born 1942), German-American author
- Peer Kluge (born 1980), German footballer
- Roger Kluge, German racing cyclist
- Walter Kluge (fl. 1930s), German luger
- Wolfgang von Kluge (1892–1976), German World War II general

== See also ==
- Klug
- Kludge
