= Lorenzo Gasparri =

Italian admiral (1894–1943)

- Born: 25 April 1894; Naples, Campania, Italy
- Died: 28 March 1943 (aged 48); Naples, Campania, Italy
- Military career
- Allegiance: Kingdom of Italy
- Branch: Regia Marina
- Service years: 1912–1943
- Rank: Ammiraglio di Divisione (Vice Admiral)
- Commands: Italian Naval Detachment in Tientsin; Francesco Nullo (destroyer); Turbine (destroyer); Taranto (light cruiser); Assab Naval Base; 1st Destroyer Squadron; Conte di Cavour (battleship); Fleet Destroyer Group
- Conflicts: World War I; Adriatic Campaign; Battle of Durazzo (1918); Second Italo-Ethiopian War; World War II; Battle of the Mediterranean
- Awards: Gold Medal of Military Valor (posthumous); Silver Medal of Military Valor (twice)

Lorenzo Gasparri (25 April 1894 – 28 March 1943) was an Italian admiral during World War II.

== Early life and career ==
Gasparri was born in Naples in 1894, and was admitted to the Livorno Naval Academy in February 1912. After graduating as an ensign in 1914, he was promoted to sub-lieutenant in 1915 and he participated in World War I on board the battleships Vittorio Emanuele and Roma, the protected cruiser Libia and the armoured cruiser San Giorgio. By 1918 he was a lieutenant and the fire control officer on San Giorgio; as such, he took part in the Battle of Durazzo, where he received a Silver Medal of Military Valor. At the end of the war, he participated in the occupation of parts of the eastern Adriatic coast by Italian forces.

In 1921 he graduated in engineering in the Polytechnic University of Milan; he then commanded a torpedo boat squadron. In 1926, after promotion to lieutenant commander, he served as the executive officer on the cruiser Libia, deployed to the Far East, and then he commanded the Italian Naval Detachment in Tientsin from May 1927 to May 1928. Between 1928 and 1929, with the rank of commander, he was the commanding officer of the destroyers Francesco Nullo and Turbine. He was then assigned for some time to the Naval Arms and Armaments Office in the Ministry of the Navy; in 1934 he attended the Naval Warfare Institute. In 1935-1936 he participated in the Second Italo-Ethiopian War, in command of the light cruiser Taranto.

After a period as the commander of the Assab Naval Command, Gasparri was promoted to captain and repatriated; he was assigned for a period to the Taranto Naval Base. Between 1937 and 1938 he commanded the 1st Destroyer Squadron, and from June 1938 to January 1940 he served as the commanding officer of the battleship Conte di Cavour.

== World War II ==
When Italy entered World War II, Gasparri was serving as the head of the artillery service in the Naval Arms and Armaments Inspectorate, a role that he kept after his promotion to rear admiral in July 1941. He was then given command of the Fleet Destroyer Group, and in this role he participated in a number of escort missions (escorting both supply convoys to North Africa and capital ships), receiving another Silver Medal of Military Valor.

On 3 January 1943 he was promoted to vice admiral. On 28 March 1943 Gasparri was in Naples for an inspection when the motorship Caterina Costa, moored in the harbour and laden with fuel and ammunition, caught fire for unclear reasons. Gasparri took the initiative to distance some barges laden with ammunitions from the blazing ship, in order to avoid a worse disaster in case of an explosion, but Caterina Costa blew up while this attempt, personally directed by Gasparri, was still underway. He was killed in the explosion along with some 600 people, whereas about 3,000 were wounded; he was posthumously awarded the Gold Medal of Military Valor.
