= Tomarovka =

Urban locality in Belgorod Oblast, Russia

Coordinates: 50°40′59″N 36°13′47″E

Tomarovka (Russian: Томаро́вка) is an urban-type settlement in Yakovlevsky District of Belgorod Oblast, Russia.

Population in 2021 was 7,394 (2021 census); with modest growth and subsequently decline after 1989: 8,094 (2010 census); 7,816 (2002 census); 7,165 (1989 Soviet census)..
