= Caterina Costa =

History
- Name: Caterina Costa
- Fate: Blew up and sank March 28, 1943

General characteristics
- Tonnage: 8,060 GRT

Caterina Costa was an 8,060-ton motor ship. On March 28, 1943, while loading ammunition and supplies at Naples during World War II, the vessel caught fire and exploded. 600 people died and over 3,000 were wounded.

== Sinking ==
On March 28, 1943, it was moored in the port of Naples in the area overlooking the district of Saint Erasmus, while being loaded with arms and supplies (1,000 tons of gas, 900 explosives, tanks and others) to be transported to Bizerte to supply war materials for the Italian armed forces stationed in Africa. A fire broke out, possibly due to arson, which became uncontrollable. The fire reached the Caterina Costa's hold, causing a devastating explosion. The pier sank and a large number of buildings around were destroyed or badly damaged. Some ships nearby caught fire and sank while hot parts of the ship and tanks were thrown at great distance, finishing in via Atri and Piazza Carlo III. Other fragments reached the Market Square and Vomero while others set fire to the central station. More than 600 dead and over 3,000 wounded filled the streets. Admiral Lorenzo Gasparri, commander of the Fleet Destroyer Group, was among the casualties; he was killed by the explosion while trying to distance some barges laden with ammunitions from the blazing ship, and he was posthumously awarded the Gold Medal of Military Valour.
