= Klug =

Klug is a surname. Notable people with the surname include:

- Johann Christoph Friedrich Klug (1775–1856), German entomologist
- Bernd Klug (1914–1975), German naval officer
- Al Klug (1920–1957), American football player
- Aaron Klug (1926–2018), Lithuanian-born chemist
- Brian Klug (fl. late 20th century), British academic
- Howard Klug (fl. c. 2000), American clarinetist & academic
- Scott L. Klug (born 1953), American politician
- Bryan Klug (born 1960), English footballer
- John Klug (born 1965), Australian footballer
- Gerald Klug (born 1968), Austrian politician
- Chris Klug (born 1972), American snowboarder
- Gerard Christopher Klug, American game designer
- Yolanda Klug (born 1995/1996), German who disappeared in 2019
