= September 1943 =

Month of 1943

<<	September 1943					>>
Su	Mo	Tu	We	Th	Fr	Sa
			1	2	3	4
5	6	7	8	9	10	11
12	13	14	15	16	17	18
19	20	21	22	23	24	25
26	27	28	29	30

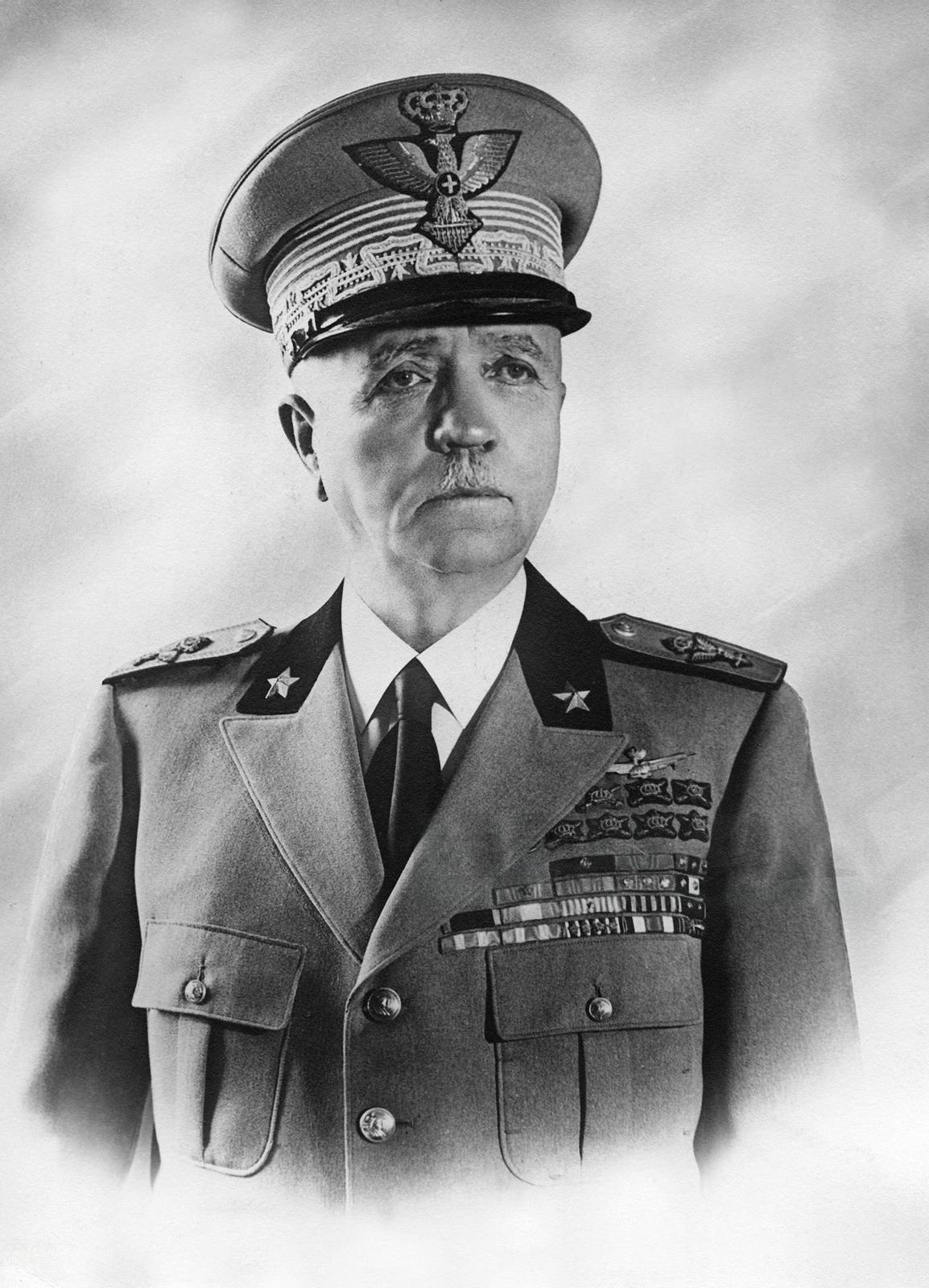
September 8, 1943: Marshal Pietro Badoglio announces the surrender of Italy to the Allies, orders Italian forces to "cease all acts of hostility against the Anglo-American forces wherever they may be met"

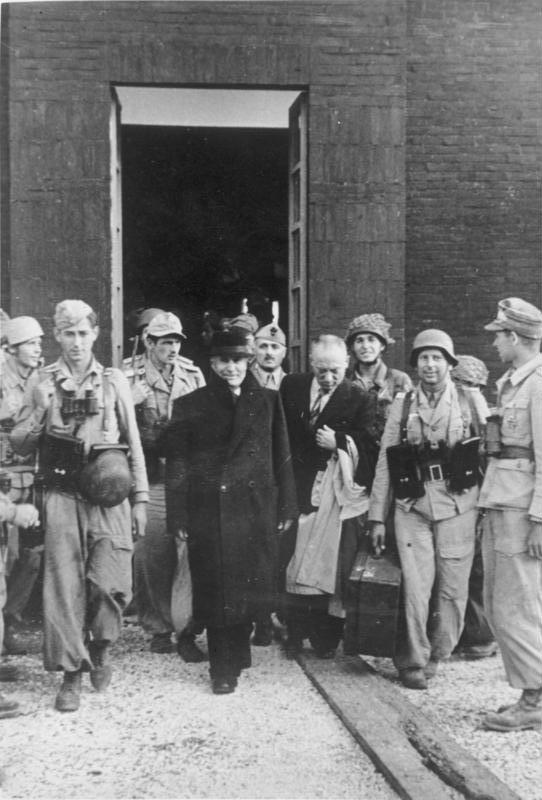
September 12, 1943: Former Italian Premier Benito Mussolini freed from prison by Nazi raid

Kingdom of Italy leaves the Axis

September 23, 1943:"Italian Social Republic" created by Germany in Venice

The following events occurred in September 1943:

== September 1, 1943 (Wednesday) ==
- Amon Göth, the Nazi commandant of the Kraków-Płaszów concentration camp, decreed that the Jewish prisoners would no longer be allowed to work in the factories in neighboring Płaszów, including the one operated by Oskar Schindler. Thereafter, Jews were required to remain inside the camp at all times, although non-Jewish Poles could continue to work.
- Minami-Tori-shima, a Japanese coral atoll that included an airstrip, located approximately 1,000 miles (1,600 km) from Tokyo, was attacked by the United States in the first successful strike of the new Fast Carrier Task Force. Rear Admiral Charles Pownall commanded Task Force 15, with three carriers (the Essex, the Yorktown and the Independence) and several support ships, that attacked the atoll.
- The Japanese submarine I-182 was depth charged and sunk in the Coral Sea by the destroyer USS Wadsworth.

== September 2, 1943 (Thursday) ==
MS Gripsholm, the neutral repatriation ship

- The ocean liner MS Gripsholm, operated by neutral Sweden to make exchanges of civilians between the Allied Powers and the Axis Powers, departed from Jersey City, New Jersey toward Mormugao in Portuguese India with 1,330 Japanese diplomats and their families residing in the United States on board. By agreement between the U.S. and Japan, the Japanese ship Teia Maru would bring American civilians to Mormugao, where an exchange would take place on October 15.
- Seweryn Klajnman, an 18-year-old Jewish inmate at the Treblinka extermination camp, led an escape of 13 of his fellow prisoners. The group killed the Ukrainian SS guard, who was overseeing their work detail, with a crowbar. Klajnman then changed into the guard's uniform, and with rifle in hand and shouting orders, marched his group out of the camp's gates as if going to a new assignment.
- Born: Glen Sather, Canadian ice hockey player, coach and Hockey Hall of Fame inductee; in High River, Alberta

== September 3, 1943 (Friday) ==
- The Italian mainland was invaded by the Allies for the first time during World War II, as the British commanding General, Sir Bernard Montgomery, sent the first British and Canadian troops across the Messina Strait, from Sicily to the southern tip of Italy. The British Eighth Army, 5th Division, and the Canadian 1st Division began Operation Baytown at 0430 GMT and encountered little resistance after going ashore at Reggio di Calabria.
- At the same time, General Giuseppe Castellano, acting with the authorization of the Italian government, secretly met with Allied officials at the village of Cassibile in Sicily to sign the Armistice of Cassibile, Italy's unconditional surrender, to "come into force at a moment most favorable to the Allies". U.S. Army General Walter Bedell Smith signed on behalf of the Allies.
- The Nazi German SS began the arrest of thousands of Jews in Belgium, with two days of raids on the cities of Brussels and Antwerp. The first of ten deportations by railroad would begin on September 20.
- The Japanese submarine I-25 was sunk off Espiritu Santo by the destroyer USS Ellet, with the loss of all 94 crew.
- Born: Valerie Perrine, American film actress and model; in Galveston, Texas
- Died: Leon Moisseiff, 70, American engineer and suspension bridge designer

== September 4, 1943 (Saturday) ==
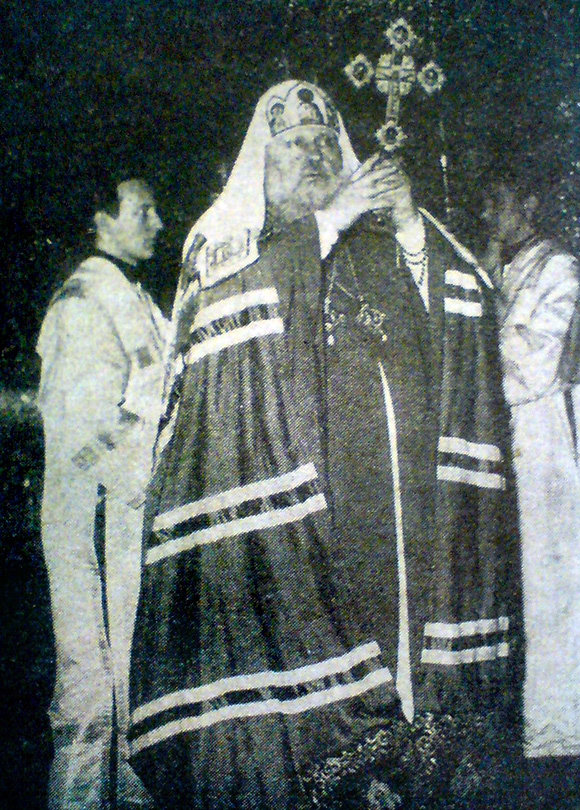
Premier Stalin and Patriarch Pimen
- Soviet Union premier Joseph Stalin hosted Sergei Izvekov (the acting patriarch Pimen I of the Russian Orthodox Church), and two other metropolitans, and offered to allow the Church to hold worship services, in return for the Church's acknowledging "the legitimacy of the Soviet state" and refraining from criticism of the government's policies. The assembled clerics agreed, and the announcement of the end of restrictions was made the next day.
- British troops, under the command of Field Marshal Bernard Montgomery, captured the Italian ports of Reggio Calabria and San Giovanni di Gerace.
- Major General George Wootten's Australian 9th Division and the 2nd Engineer Special brigade became the first Allied troops to land at New Guinea since the capture of the island by Japanese troops, coming ashore near Lae. With the Australian 7th Division, commanded by Major General George Alan Vasey, arriving soon afterward, Lae would be captured on September 16.

== September 5, 1943 (Sunday) ==
- U.S. Army Air Forces Lieutenant Alex Doster became the first person to test the paratrooper pick-up system that had been designed by All American Aviation Company. Designed to rescue downed fliers who were stranded in terrain that could not be reached from the air, the All American system used the same principle that had been applied to the picking up of mail sacks from the air. Lt. Doster volunteered for the test, wearing a special harness that minimized the g-force that resulted from being picked up from the ground at a speed of 125 miles per hour (201 km/h), and, within three minutes, climbed aboard a Stinson aircraft piloted by Norm Rintoul.
- In what General Douglas MacArthur described as "the first major parachute jump in the Pacific War", the U.S. Army 503rd Parachute Regiment landed and seized the Japanese held airport at Nadzab, just east of the port city of Lae in northeastern Papua New Guinea.
- Born: Dolores Prida, Cuban-born American advice columnist; in Caibarién (d. 2013)
- Died: Aleš Hrdlička, 74, Czech anthropologist

== September 6, 1943 (Monday) ==
- In the U.S., a train crash killed 79 people and 116 injured 116 others. The Congressional Limited Express, operated by the Pennsylvania Railroad at Philadelphia, had been en route from Washington to New York City, with 541 passengers. At 6:08 pm, nine of the 16 cars on the train derailed, after an axle on the seventh one had caught fire, causing a chain reaction that sent the cars crashing into each other.
- The important railway junction of Konotop fell to the Soviet 60th Army.
- The German submarine U-669 struck a mine and sank in the Bay of Biscay with the loss of all 52 crew.
- Born:
  - Richard J. Roberts, British molecular biologist and winner of 1993 Nobel Prize in Medicine; in Derby
  - Roger Waters, English rock musician (Pink Floyd); in Great Bookham, Surrey
- Died: Reginald McKenna, 80, British Home Secretary (1911–1915) and Chancellor of the Exchequer (1915–1916)

== September 7, 1943 (Tuesday) ==
- As the German Army retreated from the Ukrainian SSR in the Soviet Union, Heinrich Himmler issued his "scorched earth" (verbrannte Erde) order, with the goal to be "not one person remains, no cattle, no wheat, no railroad track ... neither a house nor a mine which would not be destroyed for years ... no well which would not be poisoned.
- A fire at the Gulf Hotel in Houston killed 55 men, most of them elderly residents. The blaze broke out shortly after midnight at the three-story building.
- The Italian submarine Velella was torpedoed and sunk off Salerno by the British submarine Shakespeare, with the loss of all 46 crew.
- Born: Gloria Gaynor, American singer, known for "I Will Survive"; as Gloria Fowles, in Newark, New Jersey

== September 8, 1943 (Wednesday) ==
- Italy surrendered to the Allied forces after more than three years as a member of the alliance of the Axis powers. At 7:30 in the evening local time, radio listeners in Italy were stunned to hear their Prime Minister, Marshal Pietro Badoglio, read the statement that "The Italian Government, recognizing the impossibility of continuing the unequal struggle against the overwhelming power of the enemy, and with the object of avoiding further and more grievous harm to the nation, has requested an armistice from General Eisenhower ... This request has been granted. The Italian forces will, therefore, cease all acts of hostility against the Anglo-American forces wherever they may be met ..." U.S. Army General Dwight D. Eisenhower released the news of the unconditional surrender, "effective this instant", at the same time in a broadcast from Allied Headquarters in North Africa.
- Half of the 70,000 Allied prisoners of war in Italy were able to escape in a single day, walking out of the camps when their prison guards deserted. German troops had moved into northern Italy, where the 35,000 member Jewish population was concentrated, during the 45 days since the overthrow of Benito Mussolini.
- U.S. warplanes conducted the Frascati air raid, killing 485 civilians.
- In his first public statement since March 22, Germany's Adolf Hitler delivered a radio address from Berlin to talk about the recent withdrawal of Italy from the war. Saying that "I see the time has come to speak again to the German people," Hitler said that the loss of Italy was not "due to lack of German assistance", but, rather, "failure or ill will of those elements which by systematic sabotage have caused capitulations."
- Allied forces began the Dodecanese Campaign, an attempt to capture the Italian-held Dodecanese islands of Greece.
- The Soviet 5th Shock Army entered Stalino.
- Germany ordered the removal of 5,006 Jewish residents of Theresienstadt, which had been set aside by the Nazis as a city where Jewish intellectuals could be relocated to live without interference. The group was sent to Birkenau, near the extermination camp in Auschwitz, with orders that they receive Sonderbehandlung (special treatment) for six months. In March 1944, the order would expire and the residents would be executed.
- The first classes commenced at the Grace Bible Institute in Omaha, Nebraska, with 23 students. The college would be renamed Grace University in 1995 and close in 2018.
- Born: Negasso Gidada, President of Ethiopia from 1995 until 2001; in Dembidolo (d. 2019)
- Died: Julius Fučík, 40, Czech resistance leader, was executed

== September 9, 1943 (Thursday) ==
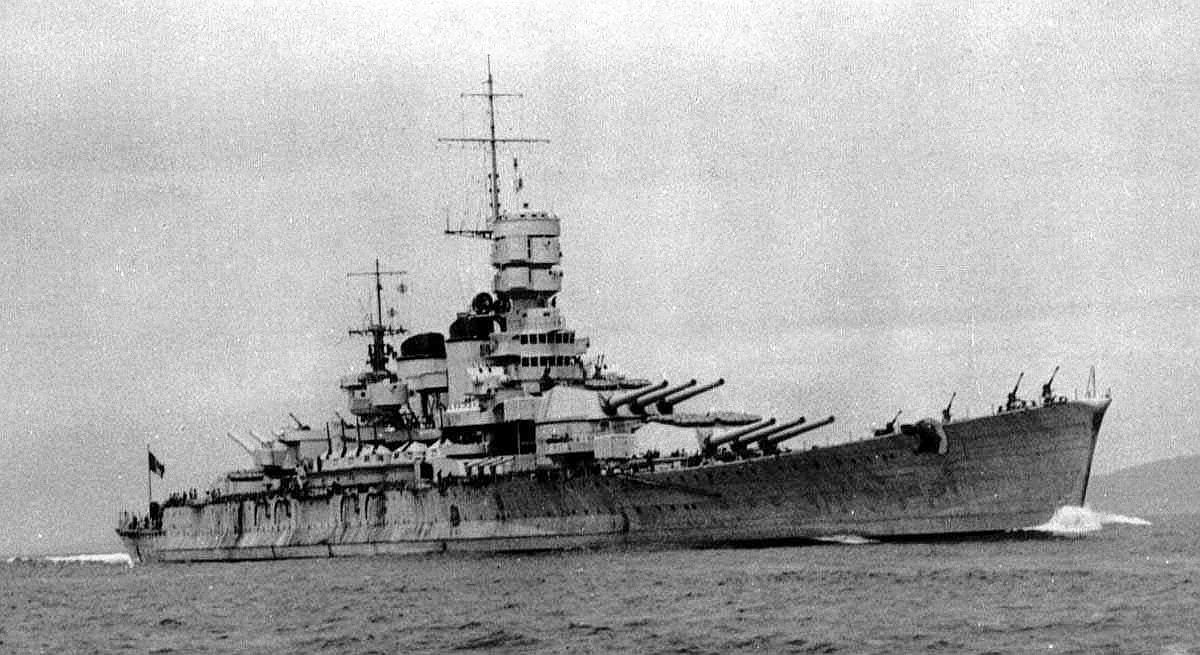
Battleship Roma

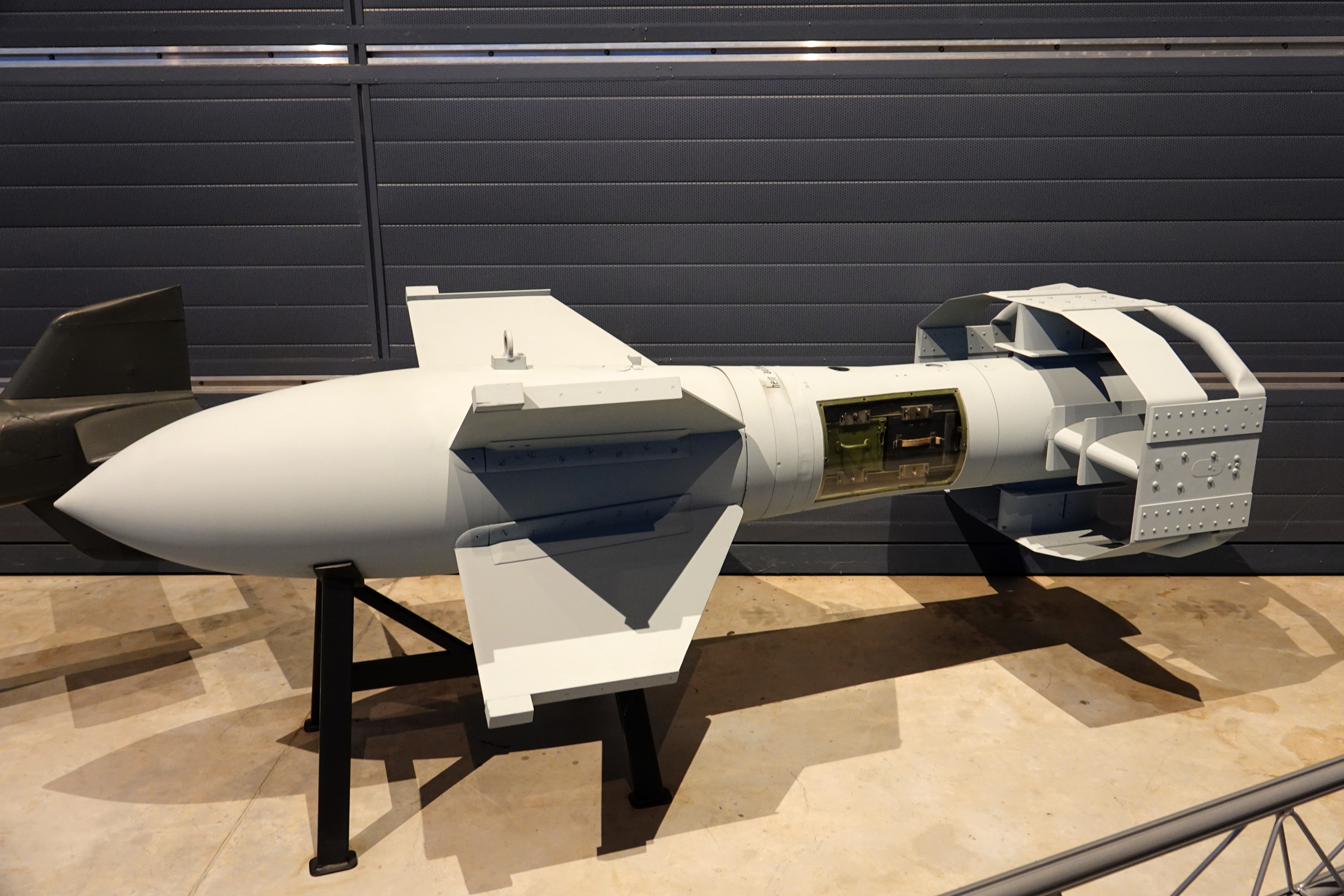
A Fritz X guided bomb

- The Italian battleship Roma was attacked by German Nazi bombers and sunk by the new guided bomb, the Fritz X. The ship went down between Corsica and Sardinia and took with it 1,253 of its crew of 1,849 including the Commander of the Italian Navy, Admiral Carlo Bergamini. The wreckage would remain undiscovered for more than 68 years; on June 28, 2012, the government of Italy would announce that the Roma had been located.
- The second phase of the Allied invasion of Italy, Operation Avalanche, commenced at 3:30 am, as the U.S. Army VI Corps and the British Army X Corps stormed the beaches at the Gulf of Salerno, and encountered heavy resistance from German forces. Lt. Gen. Mark W. Clark, who commanded the U.S. Fifth Army, decided not to precede the amphibious landings with an aerial bombardment of the German defenders, preserving an element of surprise at the expense of high casualties.
- British forces began Operation Slapstick, a landing at the crucial Italian port of Taranto, with the goal of drawing German forces away from the main Allied landings at Salerno on the same day. The operation forced Italy's King Victor Emmanuel III and Prime Minister Badoglio to flee from Rome.
- The Action off Bastia was fought as a naval battle off of the coast of Corsica in the Mediterranean Sea. In their first action since the September 3 Armistice with the Allies and Italy's departure from the Axis, the Italian Navy sank two German submarine chasers and five naval ferry barges. Eight German ships were sunk with the loss of 160 men while the Italian forces under Carlo Fecia di Cossato lost 70 people.
- The three-day Battle of Rhodes began between German and Italian forces for the Greek island of Rhodes ending with a disastrous loss of much of the 37,000 Italian armed troops to the German invaders.
- In a speech at Harvard University, Winston Churchill called for Anglo-American cooperation to continue long after the war was over.
- Iran, which had remained neutral since the outbreak of World War II, declared war against Germany, with a 73–4 vote by the Majlis to approve the decree of the reigning monarch, Reza Shah.
- The Japanese submarine I-182 was torpedoed and sunk in the Surigao Strait off Espiritu Santo by the submarine USS Trout, with the loss of all 87 crew.

== September 10, 1943 (Friday) ==
- A 7.4 magnitude earthquake killed 1,190 people in the Tottori Prefecture of Japan.
- Two days after the government of Italy agreed to surrender, German troops invaded Rome, Naples and the rest of northern Italy. Prime Minister Pietro Badoglio and King Victor Emanuel III were able to flee through German lines and escape to Allied-controlled territory, and relocated the Kingdom's government to the city of Brindisi.
- Nazi authorities created the Operational Zone of the Alpine Foothills and the Operational Zone of the Adriatic Littoral out of territories on Southern Tyrol and the northern Adriatic coast that were previously under the control of Fascist Italy.
- At noon, Vatican City closed the doors of the St. Peter's Basilica and blocked the gate of Sant'Anna, the main entrance to the independent nation from Rome, after giving sanctuary to Italians fleeing the Nazi occupation.
- The "Solf Circle", a gathering of more than 75 Berlin citizens who were opposed to the Nazi German government, was betrayed after Elisabeth von Thadden invited a new member to their group, Dr. Paul Reckzeh. Dr. Reckzeh was a Swiss native and a physician at the Charité Hospital, but was an undercover agent for the Gestapo as well. Convincing the group that he was secretly opposed to the Nazis, Dr. Reckzeh offered to smuggle letters from the group to contacts in neutral Switzerland. Afterward, he took the incriminating evidence to the Gestapo, and members of the Solf Circle would be arrested on January 12. All but two of them would be executed, including Mrs. von Thadden. Hannah Solf, who had organized the group, would survive, albeit in a concentration camp.
- After fleeing La Spezia and Taranto, 22 of the Italian Navy's warships arrived at the British naval base at Malta, turning over to Allied control after having been part of the Axis arsenal, . The number had four battleships, seven cruisers and 11 destroyers.
- The German Navy successfully employed the G7es torpedo for the first time. The weapon, fired by the German submarine U-270, was the first homing torpedo, and struck the British Royal Navy frigate HMS Lagan, killing 28 of the frigate's crew.

== September 11, 1943 (Saturday) ==
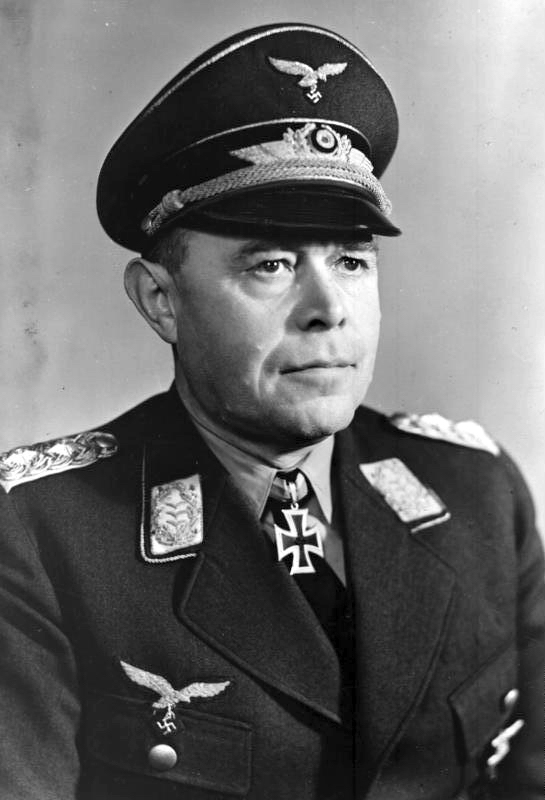
Marshal Kesselring

- German Field Marshal Albert Kesselring declared that all Italian territory was under German military control, an act that former dictator Benito Mussolini would later describe as reducing Italy to the status of a German "colony". Adolf Hitler ordered that the occupied Italian territory be divided into three zones, with the area around Rome extending south toward the front lines against the Allies, the Alpine mountain region ("Alpenvorland") and the coast along the Adriatic Sea ("Adriatische Kusterland"). Hitler also issued orders to deal with any Italian military units that had gone over to fight for the Allies, with all officers to be executed, and soldiers and non-coms to be deported to Germany as laborers.
- The USS Savannah became the first American ship to be struck by Germany's Fritz-X bomb, which punched through the decks of the warship and then exploded inside, killing 197 men. The ship was heavily damaged, but not sunk, and proceeded to the Allied base at Malta.
- German troops successfully occupied the island of Rhodes, largest of Greece's Dodecanese islands, after their success in the Battle of Rhodes. After the deaths of 447 servicemen, and the surrender by Inigo Campioni, 30,000 Italian troops were captured as prisoners of war.
- German occupying forces executed the inhabitants of the village of Aetos in Messenia, the southern peninsula of Greece.
- "Sunday, Monday, or Always" by Bing Crosby hit #1 on the Billboard singles chart.
- Born: Mickey Hart, percussionist, musicologist and member of the Grateful Dead; in Brooklyn

== September 12, 1943 (Sunday) ==
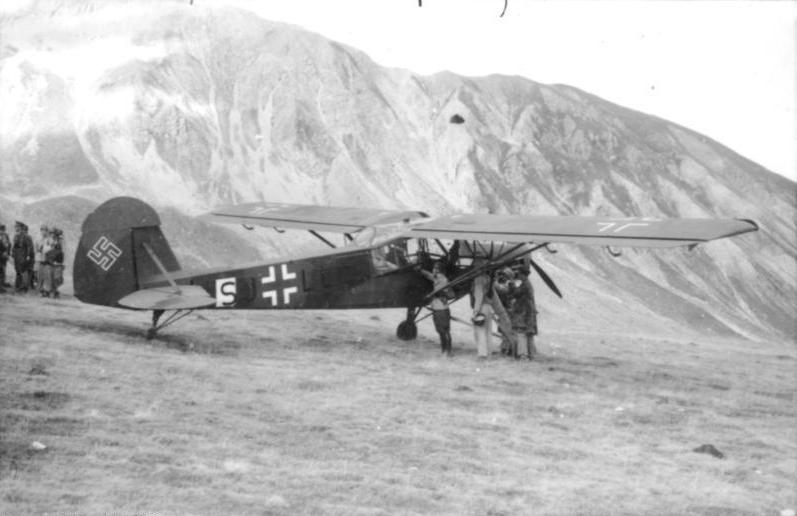
A Fieseler Storch used in the Gran Sasso raid

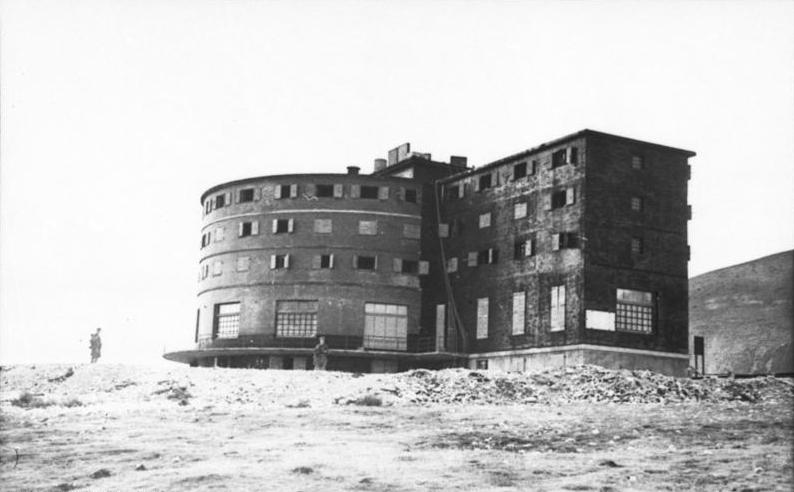
Hotel Campo Imperiale

- In the Gran Sasso raid, German SS Sturmbannfuhrer Otto Skorzeny led a rescue of Benito Mussolini, the recently deposed Italian dictator, who had been imprisoned at the Campo Imperiale Hotel, located in the Abruzzi Mountains. Shortly after 2:00 pm, eight gliders landed silently at the resort, bringing a team of German commandos. They were followed by 70 paratroopers, who secured the grounds while Skorzeny's team overpowered the Italian Army prison guards, who surrendered without a fight. Twenty minutes after the attack began, a German Fiesler Storch plane departed Gran Sasso with Mussolini and Skorzeny on board.
- In the first ceremony of its type since the Russian Revolution, a new leader of the Russian Orthodox Church was invested, with Patriarch Sergius being sworn in at Moscow's Yelokovsky Cathedral.
- The German submarine U-617 ran aground near Melilla and was then destroyed by Allied aircraft and ships.

== September 13, 1943 (Monday) ==
- The British hospital ship HMHS Newfoundland was struck by a Henschel Hs 293 glide bomb in the Mediterranean Sea. The patients and surviving crew were rescued and the ship was scuttled the next day.
- The British light cruiser HMS Uganda was struck by a Fritz X glide bomb off Salerno, Sicily and severely damaged. She would undergo heavy repairs and return to service in October 1944 with the Royal Canadian Navy as HMCS Uganda until 1952 when it was renamed Quebec.
- The first group of Japanese-American citizens was removed from the Tule Lake Relocation Center in California, to be dispersed among other United States internment camps. Over a period of 17 days, there were 6,250 Issei (immigrants to the U.S.) and Nisei (American natives) who were shipped out, after being deemed to be loyal citizens who still needed to be incarcerated. The camp was converted to a maximum security facility for those remaining Japanese-Americans deemed to be a threat.
- Adolf Hitler told his aide, Karl Wolff, that he wanted Pope Pius XII deported to Germany. Wolff would testify about the directive after the end of World War II. At the same time, Ernst von Weiszacker, the German emissary to Vatican City, delivered Hitler's personal assurances to the Vatican that its sovereignty as an independent nation would be protected, and that its area within Rome would be exempt from attack.
- The musical comedy film Thousands Cheer starring Kathryn Grayson, Gene Kelly and Mary Astor premiered at the Astor Theatre in New York City.
- Died:
  - General Ugo Cavallero, 62, former Chief of the Italian Supreme Command, shot himself. General Cavallero, who had been held in a Rome prison since the overthrow of Mussolini in July, had written a letter to Marshal Badoglio in August, "claiming that he despised Fascism and Mussolini", in an unsuccessful bid to be released. Cavallero was freed by the German occupiers on September 10, but his letter was soon discovered.
  - David Bacon, 29, American film actor, was murdered by an assailant who was never caught. After being stabbed, Bacon, "wearing only a swimsuit, with a knife protruding from his back" was able to drive away from the scene, and staggered out of his car after crashing into the curb at Santa Monica, California.

== September 14, 1943 (Tuesday) ==
- Benito Mussolini was flown to the Wolf's Lair for a meeting with Hitler, who informed him that it was imperative that a new Fascist government be set up to administer Italy.
- The British battleship Warspite was struck by a Fritz X glide bomb off Altavilla Silentina and knocked out of the war until June 1944.
- Ibrahim Biçakçiu, Bedri Pejani and Xhafer Deva declared Albania independent from Italy, which had annexed the nation in 1939. The Albanian state was occupied by two divisions of German troops, who arrived after the Italian surrender.
- The three-week long Battle of Drashovica began between partisan fighters and German occupying forces in Albania, with Albanian troops liberating their nation from the Axis by October 4.
- Nazi forces began the Viannos massacres on the Greek island of Crete. Between this day and September 16 over 500 civilians were murdered by the Wehrmacht.
- Men born on September 14, 1943, would later become those given highest priority by the draft lottery that would take place on December 1, 1969.
- Born: Irwin Goodman, Finish folk singer; as Antti Yrjö Hammarberg in Hämeenlinna (d. 1991)
- Died: Jacob Gens, 38, Lithuanian policeman who had acted as the representative of the Vilna Ghetto during the Nazi occupation of the Lithuanian SSR, and co-operated with the Nazi SS in hopes of sparing a complete liquidation of the Ghetto before the end of the war. When the Germans ordered the destruction of all ghettos, Gens was summoned to Gestapo headquarters in Vilna and executed.

== September 15, 1943 (Wednesday) ==
- The United States Army revealed the existence of its formerly top secret weapon, the bazooka (officially the AT M-1 rocket launcher), the first rocket-propelled grenade weapon. A demonstration was given to assembled reporters at the Army Infantry School at Fort Benning, Georgia.
- Three days after being freed from imprisonment by Germany, and seven weeks after his overthrow in July, Benito Mussolini was restored to leadership of Italy by the Nazi occupiers, as head of the Italian Social Republic. Mussolini made his announcement of a return to power from Adolf Hitler's headquarters at Rastenburg. On the same day, German paratroopers also landed in St. Peter's Square at Vatican City in Rome, despite the Vatican's neutrality in the war.

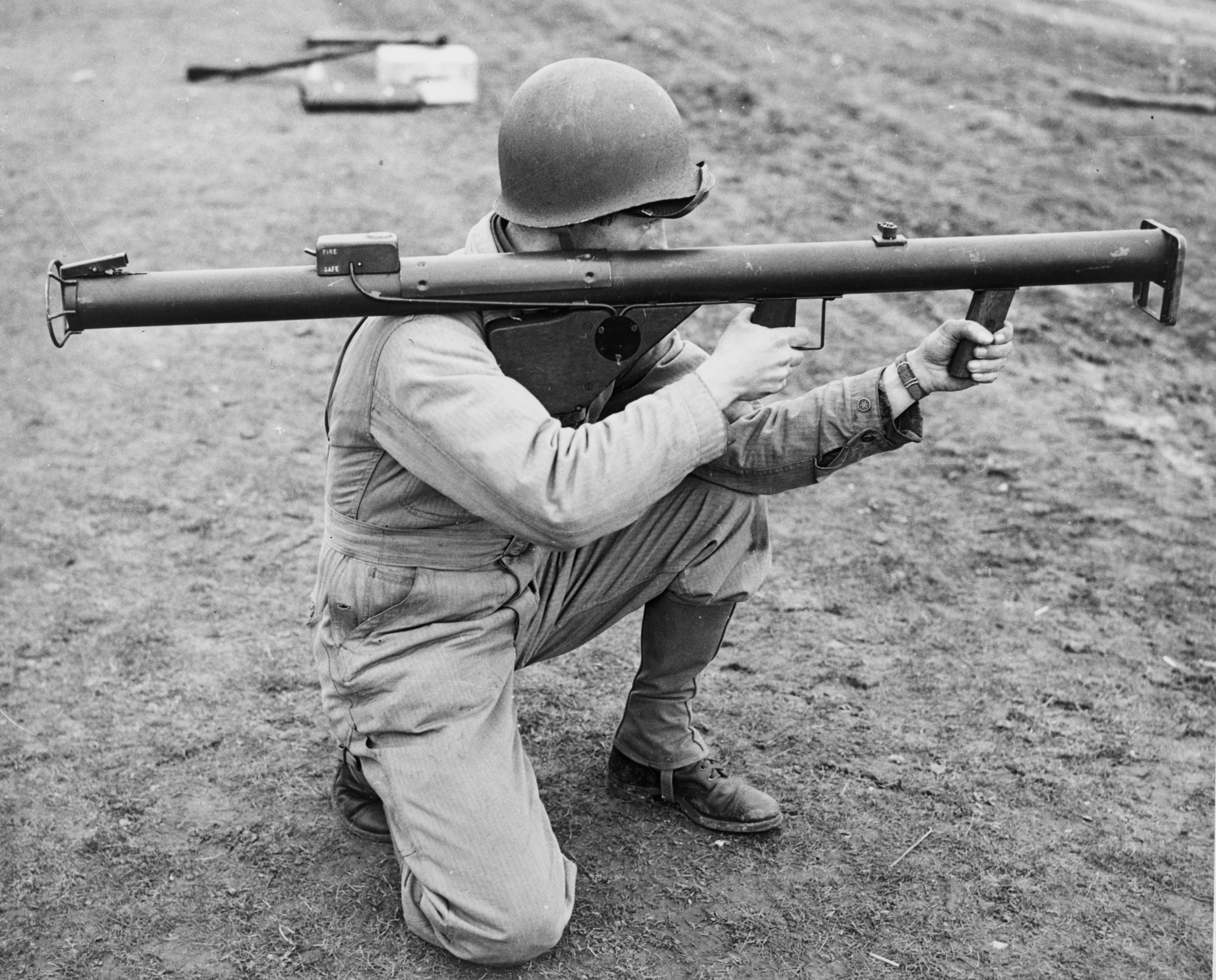
The M-1 bazooka

- The Soviet 60th Army captured Nizhyn.

== September 16, 1943 (Thursday) ==
- The Salerno Mutiny occurred when 700 soldiers of the British Army's X Corps refused postings to new units fighting in the Italian Campaign at Salerno. The majority reconsidered after British Lt. General Richard McCreery talked to them, but 192 British soldiers (mostly from the 50th Northumbrian Division and the 51st Highland Division) refused, and were later court-martialed.
- The Soviet Army recaptured the Black Sea port city of Novorossisk from German occupiers.
- Germany began the first deportation of Jews from Italy, starting with the evacuation of Merano, for eventual relocation at Auschwitz.
- U.S. Congressman James M. Curley of Massachusetts was indicted on charges of mail fraud and racketeering in obtaining war contracts. Curley had also served as the state's governor, and had been Mayor of Boston.
- The explosion of depth charge bombs at the Norfolk Naval Air Station in Virginia killed 23 men and one woman, all personnel in the U.S. Navy, and injured 250 others.
- Carbon monoxide poisoning killed 12 miners in an explosion of the Three Point Coal Company mine in Harlan County, Kentucky, but another six were able to survive death from carbon monoxide when one of them, Shelley Farley, led them in using materials at hand to construct an airtight shelter.
- Ho Chi Minh, who had been imprisoned in China for more than a year after trying to persuade the Nationalist government to assist his Viet Minh campaign against the French colonialists, was released. He would become the President of North Vietnam less than two years later.
- Born: Tadamasa Goto, Japanese yakuza organized crime boss; in Ebara, Tokyo

== September 17, 1943 (Friday) ==
- Five hundred members of the SS Croatian Division, a division of Germany's SS, composed mostly of Bosnian Muslims, mutinied at Villefranche-de-Rouergue in France, and killed several non-commissioned officers. About 150 of the rebels were killed when the uprising was suppressed, and several of the leaders of the uprising would be court-martialed and executed.
- German Army General Walther von Seydlitz-Kurzbach, a prisoner of war in the Soviet Union and the prisoners' spokesman as president of the "League of German officers", presented a proposal to the Soviet Army for an army corps of 30,000 prisoners to be created to fight against Adolf Hitler. Seydlitz, joined by two other generals, outlined the plan five days later, calling for a massive force of 42,000 German soldiers to invade Germany; a commentator would later write, "Seydlits appears to have had no idea of the death rate of Stalingrad prisoners after the surrender."
- Born: Anthony Zinni, U.S. Marine Corps General; in Conshohocken, Pennsylvania

== September 18, 1943 (Saturday) ==
- Germany carried out "Plan Asche", evacuating 25,800 German soldiers from the Italian island of Sardinia, to the German-occupied French island of Corsica. In the process, the Germans abandoned the strategically located airfields to the British and American forces.
- Mass deportations began of French Jews in Paris, with 1,150 being shipped in railroad freight cars to the Buchenwald concentration camp.
- The liquidation of Belarusian Jews in the Minsk ghetto took place with 2,000 being placed on freight cars to the Sobibor extermination camp.
- The Italian submarine Francesco Rismondo was scuttled by the Germans at Bonifacio, Corsica.

== September 19, 1943 (Sunday) ==
- Germans and Cham Albanians began the Paramythia executions in the Greek town of Paramythia and its surrounding region, putting a total of 201 Greek villagers to death over the next 10 days.
- The seven-month long Markham and Ramu Valley – Finisterre Range campaign by Australia and the U.S. against Japanese occupiers opened in New Guinea with the beginning of the two-day Battle of Kaiapit, with a victory by the Allies, who lost 37 troops, while more than 200 Imperial Japanese soldiers were killed.
- The seven-day Battle of Turjak Castle in Slovenia ended in victory for the Slovene Partisans, who completely destroyed the Anti-Communist Volunteer Militia defending the castle..
- In Lebanon, Maronite Christian leader Bechara El Khoury met with Sunni Muslim senior politician Riad Al Solh and worked out the National Pact, an arrangement for the post-independence government of the Middle Eastern nation. with the President to be a Christian, and the Prime Minister a Muslim. On October 8, President al-Khuri would appoint al-Sulh as the Prime Minister.
- German submarine U-341 was depth charged and sunk in the Atlantic Ocean by a B-24 Liberator of No. 10 Squadron RCAF, with the loss of all 50 of its crew.
- Baseball's St. Louis Cardinals captured the National League pennant with a 2–1 win over the Chicago Cubs in the first game of a doubleheader. At the time, they were 18 games ahead of the second place Brooklyn Dodgers.
- Born: Joe Morgan, American baseball player and Hall of Fame enshrinee; in Bonham, Texas (d. 2020)
- Died: Germaine Cernay, 43, French opera mezzo-soprano

== September 20, 1943 (Monday) ==
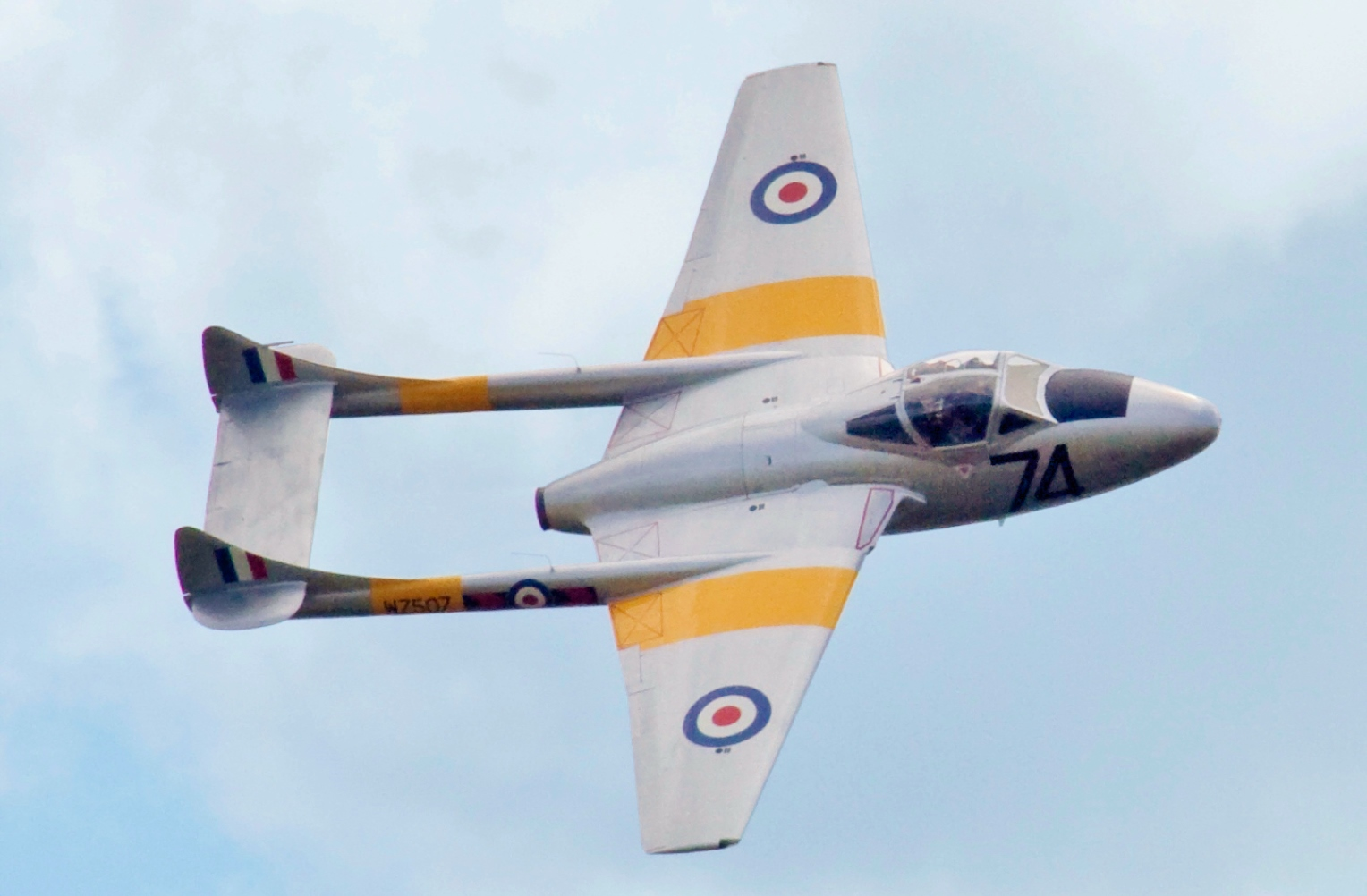
A British Vampire jet fighter

- The British de Havilland Vampire jet fighter airplane made its first flight, taking off from and landing at an airfield at Hatfield, Hertfordshire, with designer Geoffrey de Havilland piloting.
- The mass German deportation purging of Belgium's Jewish population began, as a transport train departed for the Auschwitz concentration camp with about 1,000 prisoners. Five more such operations would take place in 1943, and four in 1944.
- With Rome under control of German occupation forces, a representative of Germany's Reichsbank arrived at the headquarters of the Banca d'Italia, Italy's central bank, and ordered that 119 tons, nearly all of Italy's gold reserves, be placed in German custody in Milan.
- The Canadian destroyer HMCS St. Croix was torpedoed and sunk in the Bay of Biscay by German submarine U-305.
- The German submarine U-338 was depth charged and sunk in the Atlantic Ocean by the Canadian corvette Drumheller, and the U-346 sank in Danzig Bay in a diving accident with the loss of 37 out of 43 crew.

== September 21, 1943 (Tuesday) ==
- The Massacre of the Acqui Division began after Germany captured Italian soldiers on the Greek island of Cephalonia. Over the next five days, the Germans massacred over 5,000 POWs.
- American singer Kate Smith appeared for 18 hours on the CBS Radio Network, starting at 8:00 a.m. in New York and continuing until 2:00 a.m. the next morning, appealing to her listeners to invest in U.S. war bonds. Her performance, which reached an estimated 85 million listeners, raised $39,000,000 and "was such a success that it has been researched as a sociological case study in mass persuasion".
- The Soviet 43rd Army captured Demidov.
- The British corvette Polyanthus was torpedoed and sunk in the Bay of Biscay by U-952, with the loss of 84 of the 85 member crew.
- Born:
  - Jerry Bruckheimer, American film and television producer; in Detroit
  - David Hood, American session bassist and trombone player; Sheffield, Alabama
  - Mathew Prichard, British philanthropist, the only child of literary guardian Rosalind Hicks and the only grandchild of author Agatha Christie
- Died: Sir Kingsley Wood, 64, British Chancellor of the Exchequer since 1940

== September 22, 1943 (Wednesday) ==
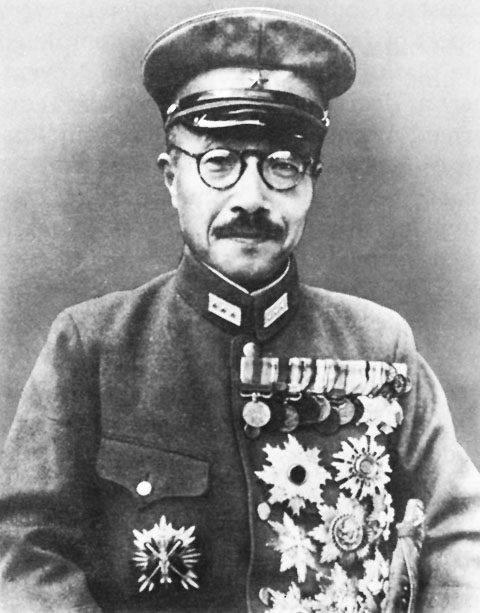
Japanese Premier Tojo

- Japan's Prime Minister Hideki Tojo declared a "time of emergency" in a government radio broadcast, and other reports were made urging the evacuation of Tokyo, with plans for the evacuation of the government there.

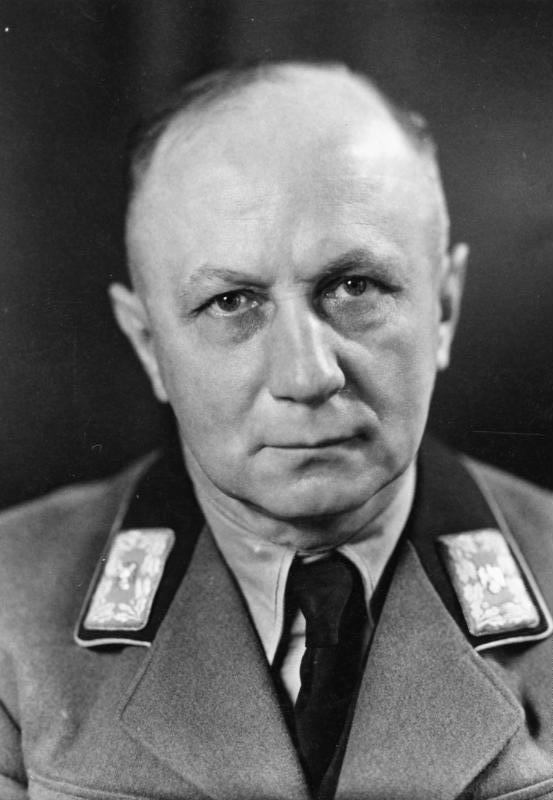
Belarusan Nazi Governor Kube

- Wilhelm Kube, the Nazi Governor of German-occupied Belarus, was assassinated at his office in Minsk, by his maid, a woman who had secretly been a member of the Russian partisans. The maid, Yelena Mazanik, had planted a time bomb in Kube's bedroom; she would be honored later as a Hero of the Soviet Union.
- A group of Italian and foreign-born Jews were massacred by the German occupiers, with the bodies dumped into Lake Maggiore.
- Against the recommendation of Nazi administrator Werner Best, Germany's Adolf Hitler gave approval for the deportation of the Jewish residents of Denmark, to begin on October 2.
- The Huon Peninsula campaign began in New Guinea with the Landing at Scarlet Beach and the beginning of the Battle of Finschhafen.
- The 13-day Battle of Dumpu began between Australian and Japanese forces in New Guinea, with a victory by Australian forces and the aid by U.S. forces
- Operation Source, off the coast of Norway ended after three days with a partial Allied success, keeping the German battleship Tirpitz out of action for at least six months.
- The German submarine U-229 was sunk off Cape Farewell, Greenland by British flotilla leader HMS Keppel with the loss of all 50 crew.
- Born: Toni Basil (stage name for Antonia Basilotta), American singer-songwriter, best known for her #1 song Mickey; in Philadelphia

== September 23, 1943 (Thursday) ==
- The Italian Social Republic, with its capital at Venice, was founded in northern Italy as a puppet state of Nazi Germany, with former Italian premier Benito Mussolini as the Head of State. The office of Mussolini, and most of the government ministries, was located in the resort town of Salò.
- Ernst Kaltenbrunner, head of Germany's SS-Reichssicherheitshauptamt— the Reich Office of Security — issued the order to arrange for the deportation of Jews from Nazi-occupied nations (Italy, Denmark, Hungary and Romania) as well as to negotiate plans for those in the neutral nations of Switzerland, Spain, Portugal, Sweden, Finland and Turkey.
- Nine days after the execution of Jacob Gens, liquidation of the Jewish ghetto in the Lithuanian capital, Vilnius, began with the removal of 5,000 people, mostly women, children, and elderly people, who were sent to the Majdanek concentration camp.
- Born: Julio Iglesias, bestselling Spanish singer and songwriter; in Madrid
- Died: Elinor Glyn, 78, British romance novelist

== September 24, 1943 (Friday) ==
- Repairs were finished on the Möhne river dam, which had been heavily damaged in a British bombing raid on May 16; the Edersee Dam, which had been bombed in the same raid, was restored to full operation six days later.
- The Soviet Voronezh Front captured Boryspil.
- An explosion at the Moffett Scharaeder mine near Minersville, Pennsylvania killed 14 coal miners.
- John Anderson replaced the late Kingsley Wood as the British Chancellor of the Exchequer.
- Born: Antonio Tabucchi, Italian Lusophile author and academic; in Pisa (d. 2012)

== September 25, 1943 (Saturday) ==
- The Soviet Red Army recaptured the Russian SFSR city of Smolensk from German occupiers after seven weeks of fighting leading to the total abandonment of the U.S.S.R. by German forces in what was described as "the greatest mass retreat in history".
- The German Armed Forces command issued a public decree for the removal from service of anyone classified as a "Mischling of the First Degree", a person who had two Jewish, or otherwise non-Aryan, grandparents. Mixed marriages (between Jews and Gentiles) had already been barred by the Nuremberg Laws of 1933.
- Baseball's New York Yankees clinched the American League pennant with a 2–1 win over the Detroit Tigers in 14 innings, ten games ahead of the Washington Senators with only nine games left.
- Born: Robert Gates, U.S. Secretary of Defense 2006–2011, Director of Central Intelligence 1991–1993; in Wichita, Kansas

== September 26, 1943 (Sunday) ==
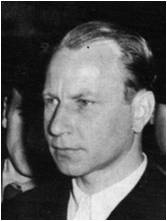
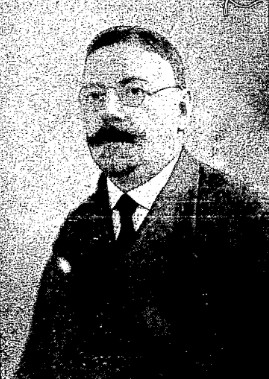
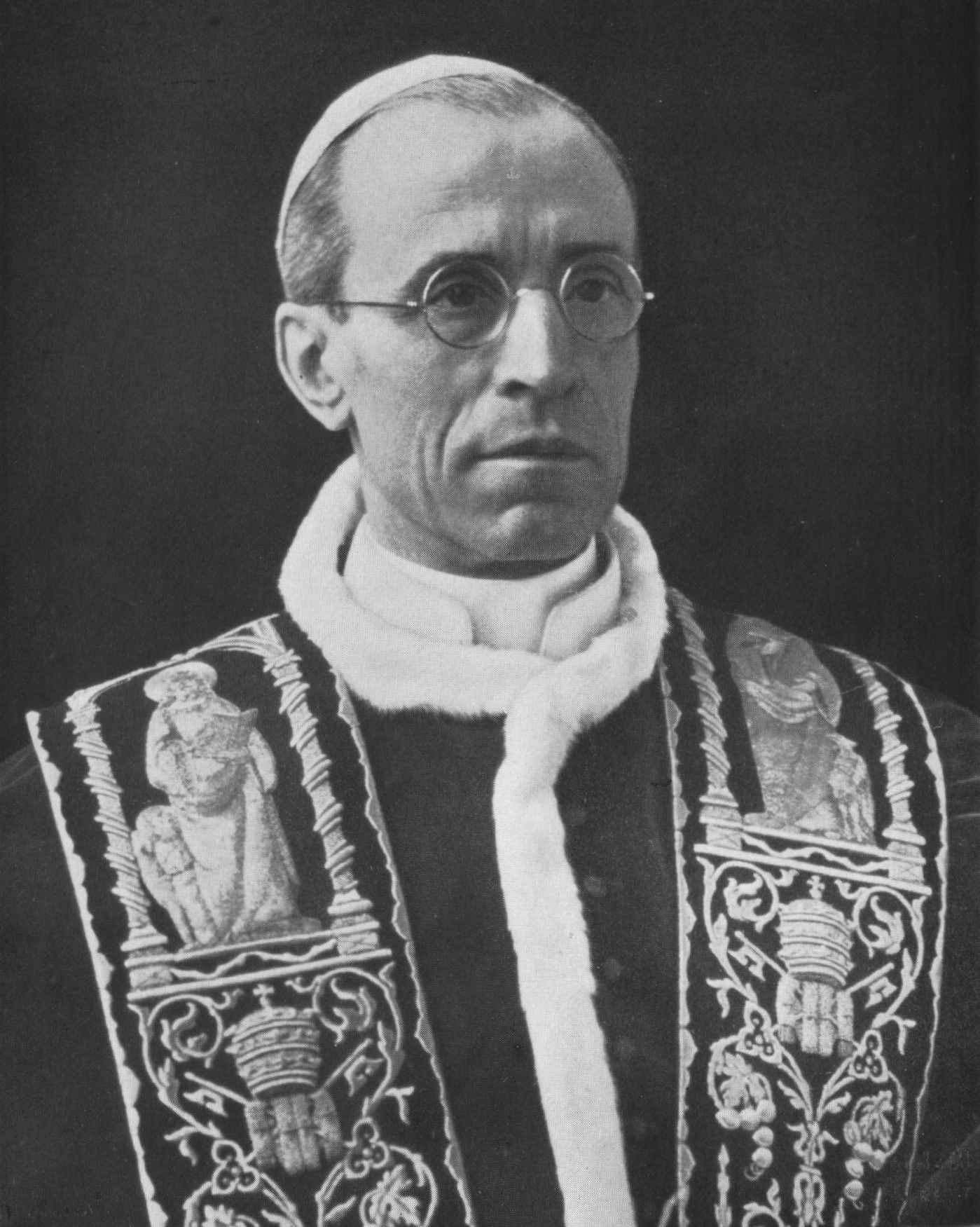
Major Kappler, Rabbi Zolli and Pope Pius XII
- Major Herbert Kappler, the German SS chief assigned to German-occupied Rome, delivered a 36-hour ultimatum to the city's Jewish community, requiring payment of fifty kilograms (110 pounds) of gold, as well as 100 million Italian lire, to SS headquarters, to avoid the mass arrest and deportation of Rome's Jews to concentration camps. Israel Zolli, the Chief Rabbi of Rome, appealed to the offices of Pope Pius XII for assistance. The Pope ordered the Vatican City treasury to deliver the remaining gold on Sunday; "probably, the Church officials melted down their religious vessels to deliver the ransom", a historian would write later.
- The British destroyer Intrepid and the Greek destroyer Vasilissa Olga were bombed and sunk at the island of Leros by the Luftwaffe. The sinking of Vasilissa Olga killed 72 men while Intrepid lost 15.
- A group of 14 commandos and sailors from the Allied Z Special Unit in Austealia carried out Operation Jaywick, a raid on Japanese shipping in Singapore Harbour.

== September 27, 1943 (Monday) ==
- The popular uprising known as the Four Days of Naples began against German forces occupying the city of Naples.The uprising would later be dramatized in Nanni Loy's 1962 film The Four Days of Naples, which was nominated for Oscars for Best Foreign Film and Best Screenplay.
- The Drysdale River Mission at Kalumburu, Western Australia, a community of Aboriginal and European Benedictine Roman Catholics, was attacked by 40 Japanese bombers and fighters, with the destruction of four of its buildings and the deaths of five people, including its leader.
- Elements of the British Eighth Army entered Foggia and occupied the surrounding airfields unopposed. The capture of the airbase put the Allies within range of the Balkans, southern Germany and Poland.
- German submarine U-161 and U-221 were both depth charged and sunk in the Atlantic Ocean by Allied aircraft. U-161 was lost with all 53 crew and U-221 with its all 50 crew.
- Assistant Professor Sam Ruben of the University of California, Berkeley, the 29-year-old co-discoverer of Carbon-14 that became the basis for radiocarbon dating, was fatally injured while conducting a laboratory experiment. Dr. Ruben was working with a defective ampoule containing the deadly chemical warfare compound phosgene, and inhaled a lethal dose when the ampoule leaked. He would die the next day.
- Died:
  - Mao Zemin, 47, (the younger brother of Mao Zedong); and Chen Tanqiu, 47, along with other founders of the Chinese Communist Party, who were all arrested and executed on orders of General Sheng Shicai, the warlord of the Xinjiang Province.
  - Luigi Viviani, 39, engineer and Royal Italian Army captain, executed in Athens by German firing squad.

== September 28, 1943 (Tuesday) ==
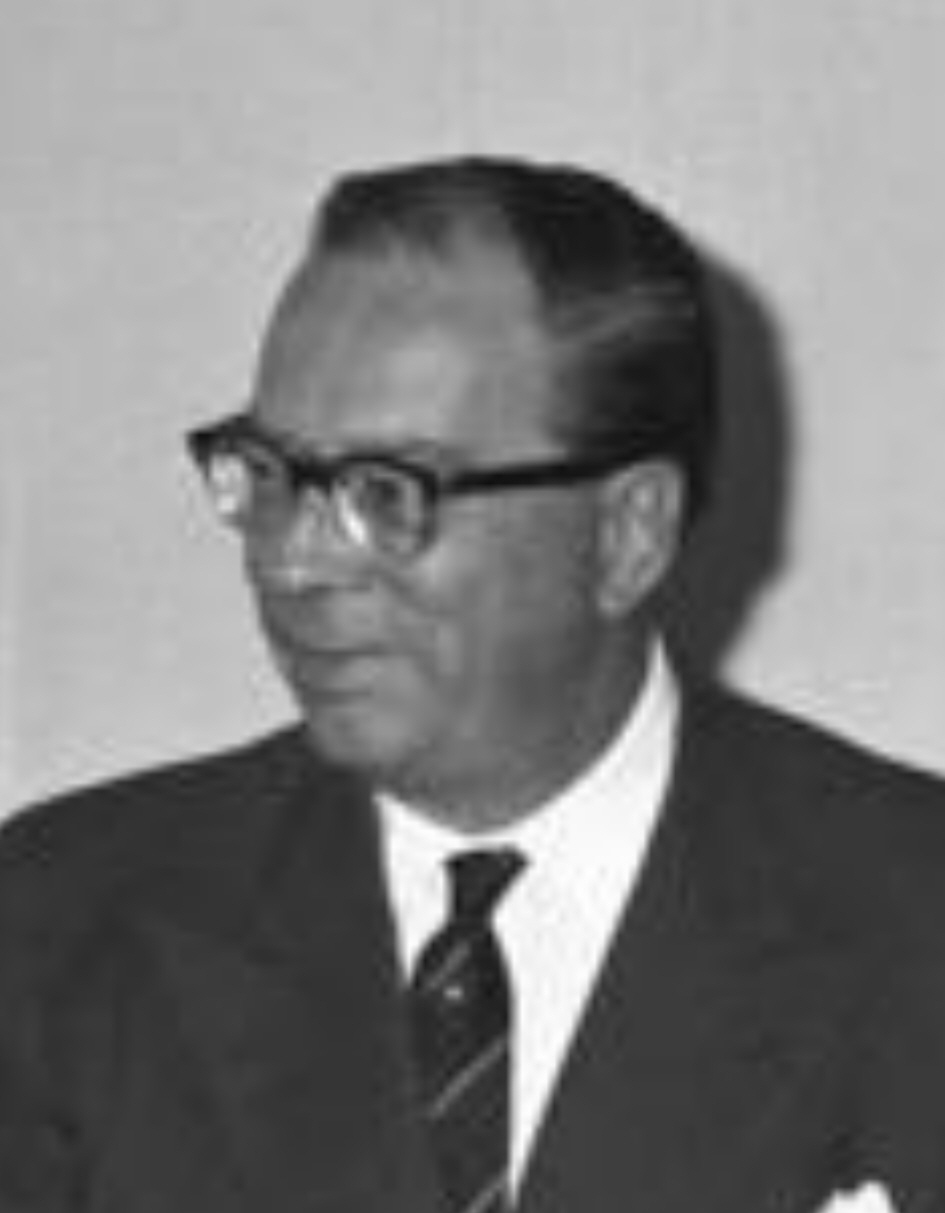
Duckwitz

- Georg Ferdinand Duckwitz, a German diplomat in Nazi-occupied Denmark, secretly warned leaders of the Danish resistance of an order from Berlin for the arrest and deportation of the Kingdom's Jewish citizens, to begin on October 1. Over the next two weeks, Danish residents helped most of the nation's 8,000 Jews elude capture; Denmark's fishermen used their boats to ferry 7,200 people to neutral Sweden.

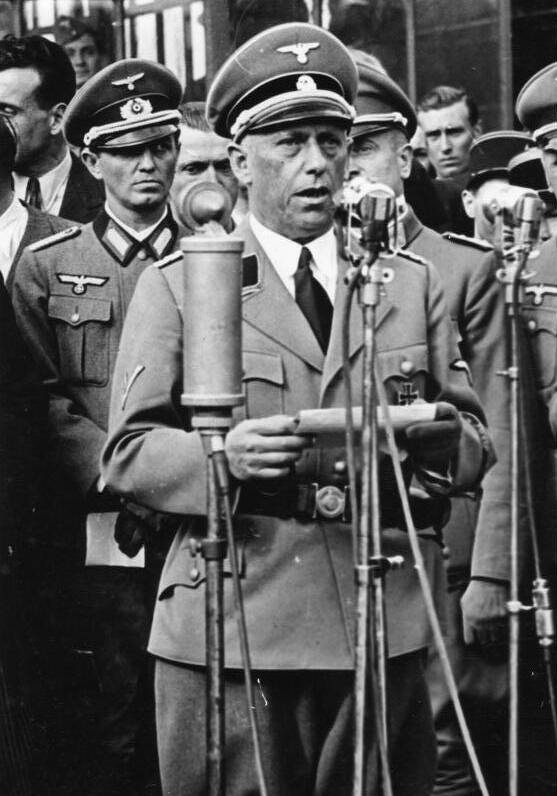
Ritter

- The tiny European nation of Luxembourg was declared Judenrein ("cleansed of Jews") by German occupation forces, with the deportation of the last of the duchy's 674 remaining Jewish citizens.
- General Julius Von Ritter, 50, administrator in German-occupied France who was in charge of the forced conscription and deportation of French men to work in Germany, was assassinated by Marcel Rayman and other members of the French Resistance.
- The American submarine USS Cisco was sunk in the Sulu Sea by Japanese aircraft and the gunboat Karatsu and lost 80 of its 81 crew.
- Born:
  - J. T. Walsh, American character actor on stage and in more than 60 films; in San Francisco (d. 1998)
  - Joel Higgins, American comedian and TV actor known for Silver Spoons; in Bloomington, Illinois

== September 29, 1943 (Wednesday) ==
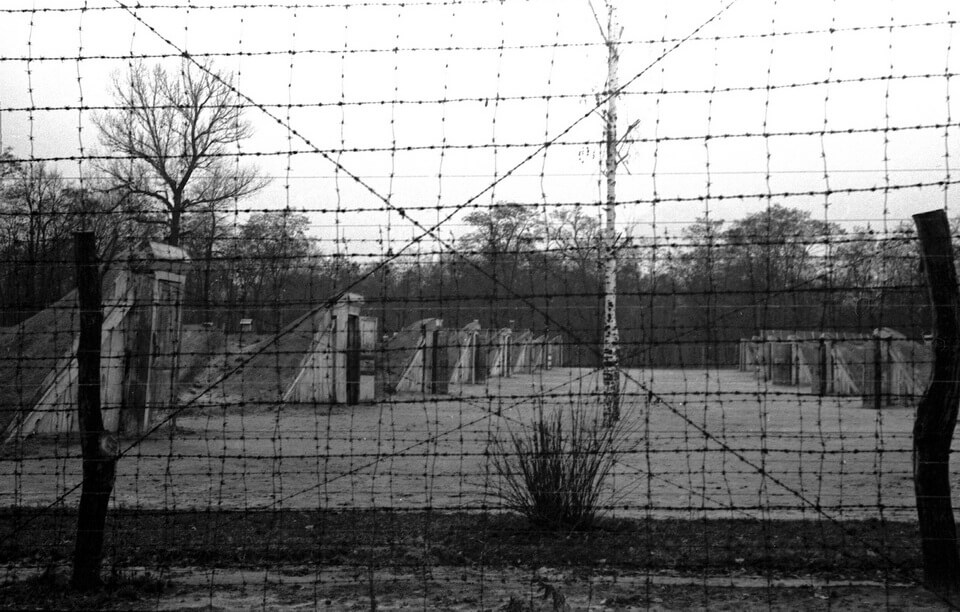
The Syrets prison camp

- The 292 Jewish inmates of the Syrets concentration camp, located in the Ukrainian SSR, rose up against their German captors as their work assignment was drawing to a close. For six weeks, the prisoners had been directed to destroy the evidence of the massacre at Babi Yar, when the Germans murdered nearly 34,000 people over two days, on September 29 and 30, 1941. The group had labored at excavating and burning the bodies of the victims, then grinding and scattering the cremains. As it became clear that they, too, would be executed when the work was finished, the inmates, led by Vladimir Davydov, staged a mass race to the prison walls at dawn. The German guards, who delayed firing their machine guns until they realized what was happening, killed 280 of the 292 escapees, but Davydov and eleven other men were able to escape, and would later reveal what had happened.
- On the Royal Navy battleship HMS Nelson, anchored in the harbor of Valletta at Malta, Marshal Badoglio of Italy, accompanied by four of his generals and an admiral, met with U.S. General Dwight D. Eisenhower and his entourage, to sign Italy's articles of surrender.
- The Soviet Steppe Front captured Kremenchuk.
- Born: Lech Wałęsa, Polish dissident who led the "Solidarity" movement, recipient of the 1983 Nobel Peace Prize, and later President of Poland from 1990 to 1995; in Popowo

== September 30, 1943 (Thursday) ==
- The Four days of Naples concluded with the liberation of Naples from German occupation, at the cost of 663 deaths of the Neapolitan resistance and 159 civilians, as well as more than 54 of the German occupation forces.
- The papal encyclical Divino afflante Spiritu was issued by Pope Pius XII, directing Biblical scholars within the Roman Catholic Church to acquire a knowledge of ancient languages for the purpose of "discovering and expounding the genuine meaning of the Sacred Books". The document was issued to coincide with the fiftieth anniversary of the 1893 issuance of the encyclical Providentissimus Deus by Pope Leo XIII.
- Born:
  - Johann Deisenhofer, German biochemist and 1988 Nobel Prize in Chemistry laureate; in Zusamaltheim
  - Mary Shaw, American computer scientist; in Washington, D.C.
  - Ian Ogilvy, British TV actor; in Woking, Surrey, England
