= Ferdinand Mainzer =

German gynaecologist and historian (1871–1943)

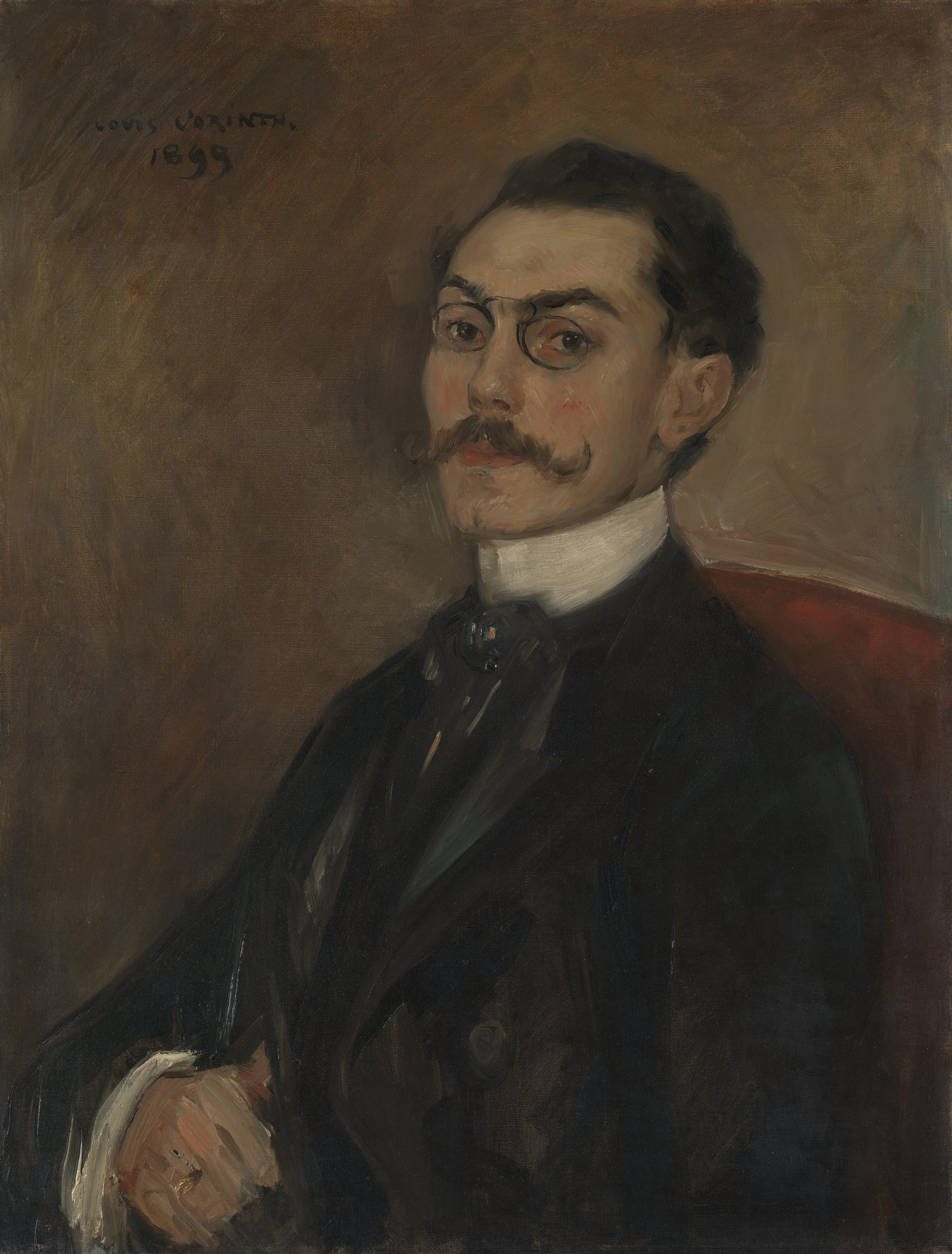
Lovis Corinth: Portrait of Dr. Ferdinand Mainzer (1899)

Ferdinand Mainzer (16 January 1871 – 3 January 1943) was a German-Jewish gynaecologist and historical author.

Born 16 January 1871, Mainzer wrote his doctoral dissertation on wandering spleen. In the 1890s he worked at the Berlin clinic of the gynecologist Leopold Landau.

Mainzer had artistic connections and historical interests. He married Gertrud Sabersky, a student of the artist Walter Leistikow, and his own portrait was painted by Lovis Corinth in 1899. After a hand injury meant that he could no longer perform surgery, he turned to writing about antiquity. He was interested in numismatics, and a friend of the numismatist Edward Gans. His biography of Julius Caesar was translated into French and English, and widely reviewed. The book inspired Thornton Wilder to write his own novel about Caesar, The Ides of March.

Mainzer was a close friend of the Catholic priest Friedrich von Erxleben, who was a member of the Solf Circle of intellectuals involved in the resistance against Nazism. Mainzer and his family were helped to escape to England by the daughter of Wilhelm and Hanna Solf, the Countess So'oa'emalelagi "Lagi" von Ballestrem-Solf, who escorted them with their jewellery hidden in the lining of her clothes.

Mainzer died 3 January 1943 in Los Angeles. His daughter Lucie Manén married Otto John in 1949. He also had a son Max Mainzer (1902–1987) who married Eva Perlis (1908–2006). In May 2021, a portrait of Ferdinand Mainzer by Lovis Corinth was accepted for the nation in lieu of a UK inheritance tax bill. Corinth also painted a portrait of Max entitled Max Mainzer with a Siberian Greyhound (1912).

== Works ==
- Wandermilz und Splenektomie, München: J. F. Lehmann, 1892
- 'Das Dekadrachmon von Athen', Zeitschrift für Numismatik, vol. 36 (1926), pp. 37–54
- Siciliana aus griechisch-römischer Zeit, Berlin: Klinkhardt & Biermann, 1930.
- Clodia: Politik und Liebe auf dem Palatin, Berlin: Klinkhardt & Biermann, 1931.
- Der Kampf um Caesars Erbe, Leipzig: E.P. Tal, 1934. Translated by Eden and Cedar Paul as Caesar's mantle; the end of the Roman republic, New York: Viking, 1936.
