= Solf =

Solf may refer to:

- Asteroid 9872 Solf, named after astronomer Josef Solf (born 1934)
- Solf (municipality), a former municipality in Ostrobothnia, Finland
- Hanna Solf (1887-1954), key member of the Solf Circle
- Reinhild Solf (1940-2022), German actress
- Wilhelm Solf (1862-1936), German politician and statesman
