= SeSiSo Club =

German political organisation

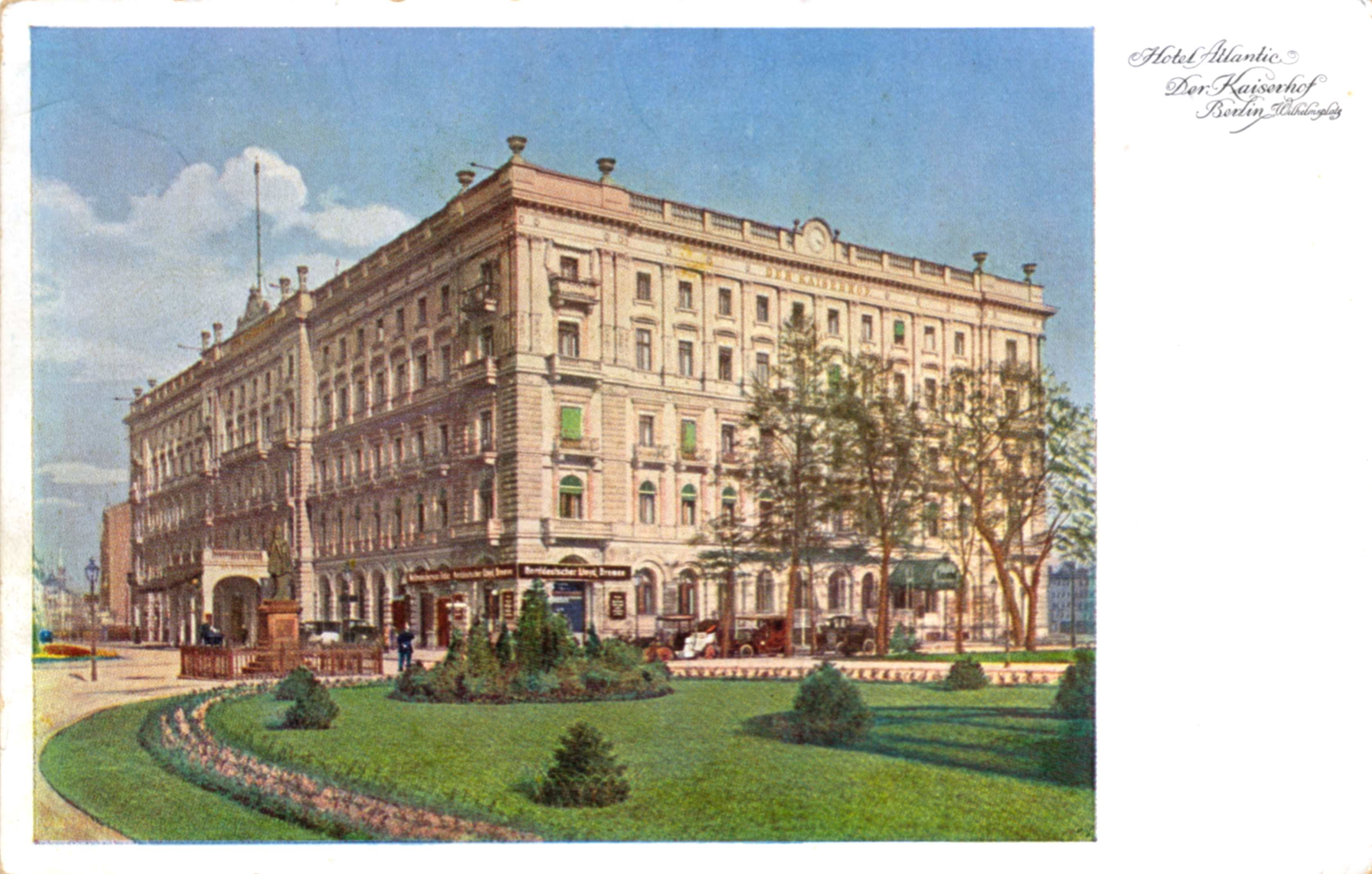
Hotel Kaiserhof, Berlin

The SeSiSo Club was a political and cultural discussion group in Berlin in the 1920s. Its members were of diverse political affiliations. The club had no official existence; its name was derived from the surnames of its chairmen, Hans von Seeckt, Walter Simons, and Wilhelm Solf.

The club's values were enlightenment and humanism. Meetings took place in the Hotel Kaiserhof with up to 400 participants, often members of the elite, discussing the issues of the time. The first meeting was on 2 January 1922, and the club continued into the 1930s.

Guests included Harry Graf Kessler, Otto Hoetzsch, Richard von Coudenhove-Kalergi, Sir Horace Rumbold (when he was British ambassador in Berlin), Ernst von Harnack, Arthur Zarden, Kurt von Hammerstein-Equord, and Paul Wolff Metternich.

Although the club had little political influence, during the time of National Socialism, some of its members joined various resistance groups, including the Solf Circle.

== Bethmann Dinner ==
On 29 November 1921, Seeckt, Simons, and Solf entertained Walther Rathenau and Kurt von Hammerstein-Equord to dinner in honour of Chancellor Theobald von Bethmann-Hollweg, who had died on 1 January 1921, and whose birthday was on 29 November. The SeSiSo Club continued the tradition of a gala Bethmann Dinner every 29 November.
