= Friedrich Erxleben =

Friedrich Erxleben

Father Friedrich Erxleben, SJ (27 January 1883, Koblenz – 9 February 1955, Linz am Rhein) was a Jesuit priest and member of the "Solf Circle" German Resistance group.

The purpose of the Solf Circle was to seek out humanitarian ways of countering the Nazi regime. It met at either Frau Solf or Elizabeth von Thadden's home. Von Thadden was a Christian educational reformer and Red Cross worker. The activities of "Frau Solf Tea Party" were discovered by Himmler and most of the group were executed.

Erxleben, along with fellow Jesuit, Augustin Rösch, was among the resistance survivors who narrowly escaped execution in the dying days of the war by convincing the governor of the Lehrter Strasse prison that they should be set free by telling the governor that he was likely to be executed by the Red Army if he did not release them. The governor relented on 25 April 1945.

== See also ==
- Catholic Church and Nazi Germany
- Catholic resistance to Nazi Germany
