= Otto Kiep =

German civil servant implicated in the 20 July Plot (1886–1944)

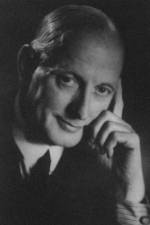
Otto Kiep

Otto Carl Kiep (7 July 1886 – 26 August 1944) was the Chief of the Reich Press Office (Reichspresseamt). He became involved with the resistance against the Nazis and was executed in 1944.

== Life ==
Otto Kiep was born in Saltcoats, Ayrshire, Scotland (while his parents were on holiday there), to Imperial Consul Johann Nikolaus Kiep and his wife Charlotte (née Rottenburg). He was brought up, with his three brothers and sister, in the West End of Glasgow, residing at Hughenden Terrace. His uncle, Johan Carl, resident in nearby Kelvinside, was a successful merchant in the city, and the Kiep family was prominent and popular in Victorian Glasgow society. One of Otto's cousins, Walter, stayed in Glasgow and went on to serve as a doctor in the British army.

In 1909, when Otto was aged 24, the family moved to Ballenstedt, Anhalt, Germany. After going to the Gymnasium at the Ilfeld monastery school, Otto Kiep studied law in Germany and London, and graduated from the University of Leipzig with a Dr jur. degree, while also earning a Bachelor of Law degree in London. Already at this time, his thinking and influence leant towards peace and international understanding, which his biographer and son-in-law Bruce Clements attributes to his liberal upbringing in Scotland.

Otto Kiep was with the German Embassy in Washington, D.C. from 1927 to 1931 as an embassy adviser, and from 1931 to 1933, he was Consul General in New York. He later established ties with resistance circles, with Hanna Solf (see "Frau Solf Tea Party"), and with the Kreisau Circle about Helmuth James Graf von Moltke.

As Chief of the Reich Press Office, the name Otto Kiep appeared on the list of the group around the men of the failed 20 July Plot to assassinate Adolf Hitler at the Wolf's Lair in East Prussia. After his arrest in 1944, he was sentenced at the Volksgerichtshof by Roland Freisler to death, and one month after the plot's failure, on 26 August 1944, Otto Kiep was hanged at Plötzensee Prison in Berlin.

News of Kiep's arrest reached close friend (and Abwehr intelligence agent) Erich Vermehren, who decided to defect to the British along with his wife in January 1944 rather than be arrested by the Gestapo. The defection enraged Hitler, who ordered the Abwehr dissolved.
