= We Survived: Fourteen Histories of the Hidden and Hunted in Nazi Germany =

Non-fiction first published 1949

We Survived: Fourteen Histories of the Hidden and Hunted of Nazi Germany
- Author: Eric Boehm
- Published: 1949
- Publisher: Yale University Press
- Pages: 308
- OCLC: 544695
- Dewey Decimal: 943.086
- LC Class: 49011621

We Survived: Fourteen Histories of the Hidden and Hunted of Nazi Germany is a compilation of survival narratives of individuals who survived persecution by Hitler's government before and during World War II. The book has been reissued multiple times since its original release in 1949 and continues to be a cited work in the literature of the Holocaust. Eric Boehm had been a "press control officer" with the American military government in post-war Germany. The stories are mostly told by German nationals from the Berlin area.

Alfred Werner, a former prisoner of Dachau, reviewed the book for the New York Times. The book was described as an important antidote to the human "incapacity for sustained realization of horror."

== The stories ==
- Alice Stein-Landesmann
- Herbert Kosney
- Knud Christian Knudsen
- Valerie Wolffenstein
- Eric Hopp
- Moritz Mandelkern
- Lagi Countess Ballestrom-Solf
- Rolf Joseph and Alfred Joseph
- Eugen Gerstenmaier
- Günther Weisenborn
- Heinrich Liebrecht
- Jeanette Wolf
- Leo Baeck

== See also ==
- Bibliography of Nazi Germany
