= Japanese submarine I-182 =

1st class submarine of the Imperial Japanese Navy

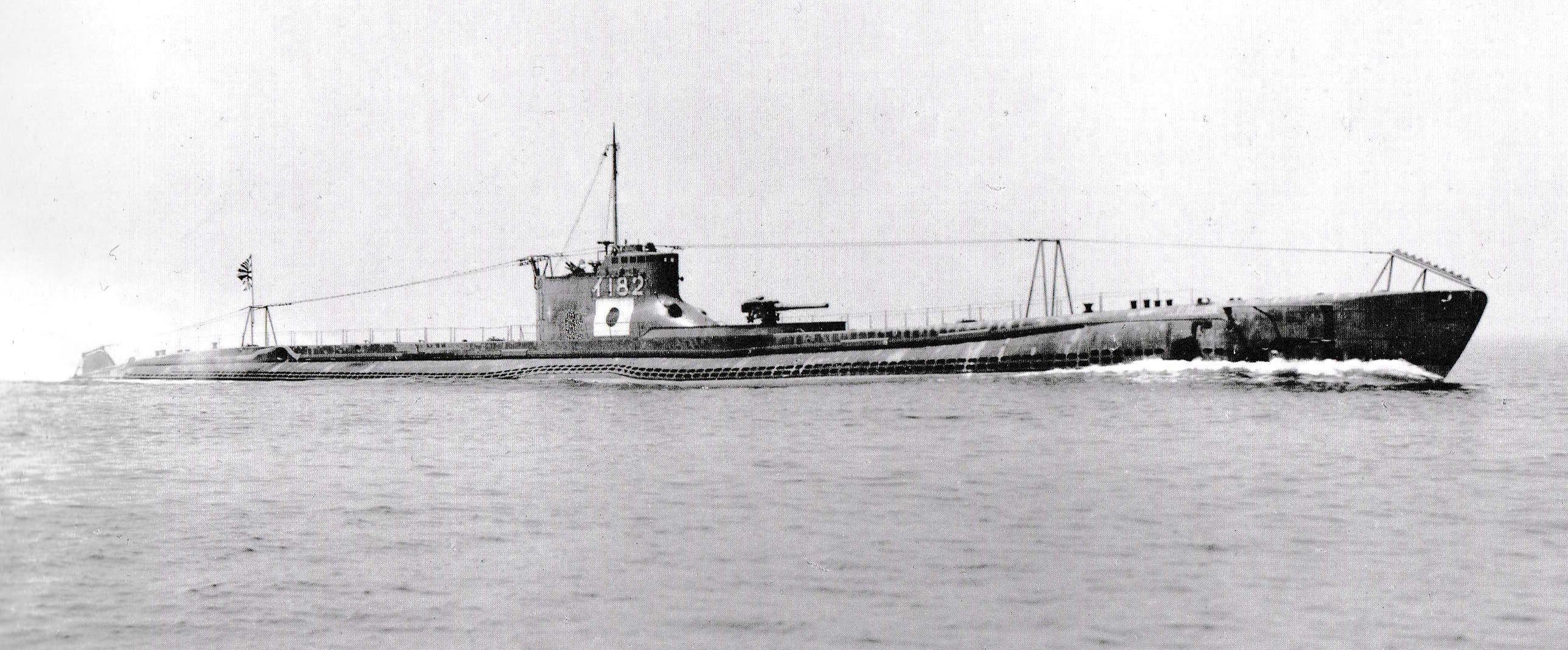
- I-182 on sea trials, 2 May 1943

History

Empire of Japan
- Name: I-82
- Builder: Yokosuka Naval Arsenal, Yokosuka, Japan
- Laid down: 10 November 1941
- Renamed: I-182 on 20 May 1942
- Launched: 30 May 1942
- Completed: 10 May 1943
- Fate: Lost early September 1943 (see text)
- Stricken: 1 December 1943

General characteristics
- Class & type: Kaidai type, KD7-class
- Displacement: 1,862 t (1,833 long tons) surfaced; 2,644 t (2,602 long tons) submerged
- Length: 105.5 m (346 ft 2 in)
- Beam: 8.25 m (27 ft 1 in)
- Draft: 4.6 m (15 ft 1 in)
- Installed power: 8,000 bhp (5,966 kW) (diesels); 1,800 hp (1,342 kW) (electric motors)
- Propulsion: Diesel-electric; 2 × diesel engines; 2 × electric motors
- Speed: 23 knots (43 km/h; 26 mph) surfaced; 8 knots (15 km/h; 9.2 mph) submerged
- Range: 8,000 nmi (15,000 km; 9,200 mi) at 16 knots (30 km/h; 18 mph) surfaced; 50 nmi (93 km; 58 mi) at 5 knots (9.3 km/h; 5.8 mph) submerged
- Test depth: 80 m (262 ft)
- Complement: 86
- Armament: 6 × 533 mm (21 in) torpedo tubes (all bow); 1 × 120 mm (4.7 in) deck gun; 1 × twin 25 mm (1.0 in) Type 96 AA gun

I-182 (originally I-82) was an Imperial Japanese Navy Kaidai-type cruiser submarine of the KD7 sub-class commissioned in 1943. During World War II, she was lost in 1943 while on her first war patrol.

== Design and description ==
The submarines of the KD7 sub-class were medium-range attack submarines developed from the preceding KD6 sub-class. They displaced 1,862 metric tons (1,833 long tons) surfaced and 2,644 metric tons (2,602 long tons) submerged. The submarines were 105.5 meters (346 ft 2 in) long and had a beam of 8.25 meters (27 ft 1 in) and a draft of 4.6 meters (15 ft 1 in). They had a diving depth of 80 m (262 ft) and a complement of 86 officers and crewmen.

For surface running, the submarines were powered by two 4,000-brake-horsepower (2,983 kW) diesel engines, each driving one propeller shaft. When submerged, each propeller was driven by a 900-horsepower (671 kW) electric motor. The submarines could reach 23 knots (43 km/h; 26 mph) on the surface and 8 knots (15 km/h; 9.2 mph) submerged. On the surface, the KD7s had a range of 8,000 nautical miles (15,000 km; 9,200 mi) at 16 knots (30 km/h; 18 mph); submerged, they had a range of 50 nmi (93 km; 58 mi) at 5 knots (9.3 km/h; 5.8 mph).

The submarines were armed with six internal 53.3 cm (21.0 in) torpedo tubes, all in the bow. They carried one reload for each tube, a total of 12 torpedoes. They were originally intended to be armed with two twin-gun mounts for the 25 mm (1.0 in) Type 96 anti-aircraft gun, but a 120 mm (4.7 in) deck gun was substituted for one 25 mm mount during construction.

== Construction and commissioning ==
I-182 was laid down at the Yokosuka Naval Arsenal in Yokosuka, Japan, on 10 November 1941 as I-82. Renamed I-182 on 20 May 1942, she was launched on 30 May 1942. She was completed and commissioned on 10 May 1943.

== Service history ==
=== First war patrol ===
I-182 departed Sasebo, Japan, on 8 August 1943 bound for Truk Atoll in the Caroline Islands, which she reached on 15 August 1943. She got underway from Truk on 22 August 1943 to begin her first war patrol, assigned a patrol area in the vicinity of Espiritu Santo in the New Hebrides. She did not return from her patrol.

=== Loss ===
The exact circumstances of I-182′s loss remain unknown. I-182 and the submarine I-20 both were patrolling in the vicinity of the New Hebrides at the time, and neither returned. United States Navy forces reported two successful antisubmarine attacks off Espiritu Santo in early September 1943.

The first action took place on 1 September 1943, when the destroyer USS Wadsworth (DD-516), operating as part of a hunter-killer group, began a search for a reported Japanese submarine off Espiritu Santo at 10:55. After searching on a north-south axis, she picked up a strong sonar contact at 13:00, and dropped a pattern of ten depth charges set to explode at an average depth of 150 feet (46 m). The attack produced no signs of success, so Wadsworth commenced a second attack, with her depth charges set for an average of 250 feet (76 m). The submarine turned to port just before Wadsworth launched the depth charges, then headed south before turning northeast, creating an underwater wake that degraded Wadsworth′s sonar detection capability. Wadsworth made several attack runs without dropping depth charges before firing a deep pattern set to explode at an average depth of 425 feet (130 m). This resulted in a very large air bubble rising to the surface, but no other sign of a submarine in distress. Wadsworth continued to pursue the submarine, which maneuvered to create more underwater turbulence in an attempt to defeat Wadsworth′s sonar. Wadsworth dropped a final pattern of ten depth charges set to explode at an average depth of 250 feet (76 m), then turned east and opened the range. A PBY Catalina flying boat reported debris and a 400-by-600-yard (370 by 550 m) oil slick that smelled like diesel fuel on the surface just south of the location of Wadsworth′s final attack. Wooden debris also was sighted on the surface at 15°38′S 166°57′E.

The second action occurred on 3 September 1943, when the destroyer USS Ellet (DD-398) conducted a sweep for a reported Japanese submarine off Espiritu Santo. Ellet picked up a radar contact at a range of 13,000 yards (11,900 m) at 19:35, closed to a range of about 5,000 yards (4,600 m), and challenged the unseen contact with a visual signal. After Ellet received no reply, she illuminated the area with star shells. The target disappeared from radar at a range of 3,400 yards (3,100 m), but Ellet then picked up a sonar contact at a range of 3,000 yards (2,700 m). Between 20:12 and 20:38 Ellet conducted a series of depth charge attacks. She lost sonar contact at 20:59, and at dawn on 4 September 1943 a large oil slick and debris were sighted on the surface at 13°10′S 165°28′E.

The submarines Wadsworth and Ellet sank remain unidentified. It seems likely that one of them was I-182 and the other I-20.

On 15 September 1943, the Japanese sent I-182 orders to return to Truk, but she did not acknowledge the signal. On 22 October 1943, the Imperial Japanese Navy declared I-182 lost with her entire crew of 87 men off Espiritu Santo. The Japanese struck her from the Navy list on 1 December 1943.
