= Elisabeth von Thadden =

German resistance member (1890–1944)

- Born: 29 July 1890; Mohrungen, East Prussia
- Died: 8 September 1944 (aged 54); Plötzensee Prison, Berlin, Nazi Germany
- Resting place: unknown
- Citizenship: German
- Occupation: Educator
- Movement: Solf Circle

Elisabeth Adelheid Hildegard von Thadden (29 July 1890 – 8 September 1944) was a German progressive educator and a resistance fighter against the Nazi régime as a member of the Solf Circle. She was sentenced to death for conspiring to commit high treason and undermining the fighting forces (Wehrkraftzersetzung).

== Early life and family ==
Elisabeth von Thadden was born in Mohrungen, East Prussia (present-day Morąg, Poland) to the long-established noble Thadden family. Her parents were Adolf Gerhard Ludwig von Thadden (1858–1932), Prussian county commissioner (Landrat) of Landkreis Greifenberg in Pomerania (now Powiat Gryficki in Poland), and Ehrengard von Gerlach (1868–1909). She was the eldest of five children. In 1905, the family moved to the Trieglaff (Trzygłów) estate in Pomerania, where Thadden grew up in a big Protestant family.

Elisabeth's brother, Reinold (1891–1976), grew up to be a famous theologian and jurist, and her nephew, Reinold's son, Rudolf (born 1932) is a well-known German historian. Her sister, Ehrengard Schramm (1900–1985), was a Social Democratic politician and member of the Lower Saxon Landtag. Her half-brother Adolf von Thadden (1921–1996), rose to be the National Democratic Party's chairman after World War II in West Germany. Elisabeth herself never married and has no direct descendants.

Elisabeth attended boarding school in Baden-Baden and the renowned Reifenstein school. Upon her mother's death in 1909, Thadden took over managing the family estate, as well as the care of her youngest siblings. She kept an open and hospitable house in Trieglaff, which also was the scene of several discussion circles organized by her and her father. These Trieglaffer Konferenzen attracted politicians, theologians, jurists, and scientists of many political stripes. Here she met with Friedrich Siegmund-Schultze, a theologian, social pedagogue and pioneer of the peace movement, who became a close friend. Thadden always felt a keen connection with her fellow human beings, and this showed up early on when, during World War I, she made it possible for many city children to spend time in the somewhat more idyllic setting of Trieglaff.

== Career ==
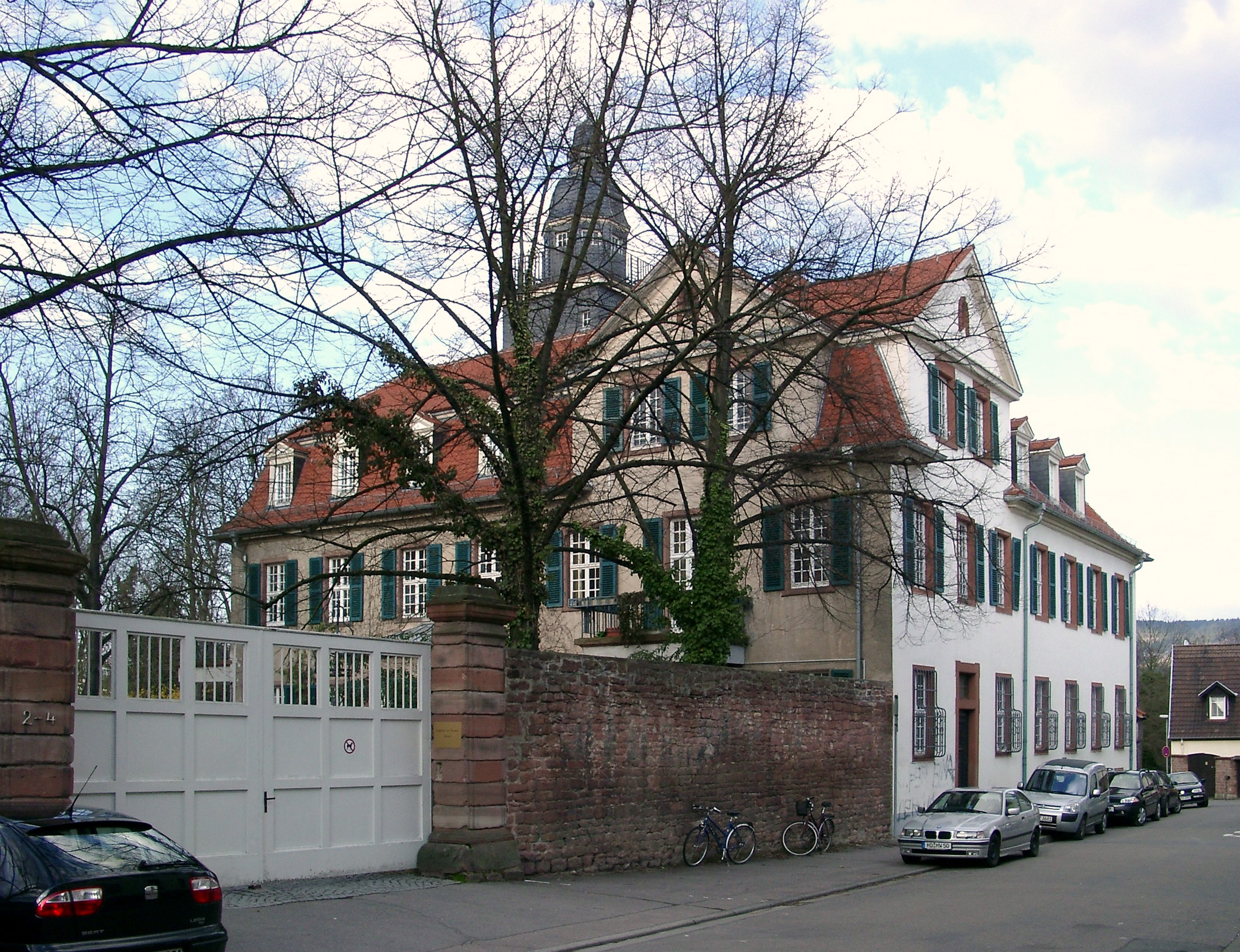
Elisabeth von Thadden School, Heidelberg

After the war, in 1920, Elisabeth's father remarried to Barbara Blank (1895–1972). Thadden and her sisters left Trieglaff, she herself moved to Berlin to pursue a career in education. She attended the Soziale Frauenschule led by social reformer Alice Salomon, where she came into contact with educational progressivism. After training there, she got a job at a children's camp in Heuberg in the Swabian Jura, later also gaining experience at the Kurt Hahn school.

Having been offered the opportunity to lease an unoccupied country house, Schloss Wieblingen near Heidelberg, in 1926, Thadden quickly found a use for it. At Easter 1927, after receiving government approval to do so, as well as obtaining the requisite funds, Schloss Wieblingen became the home of Thadden's Evangelisches Landerziehungsheim für Mädchen, a private boarding school for girls incorporating the Christian ethics that Thadden had been brought up with and held dear, as well as Kurt Hahn's educational ideas. The initial enrolment was thirteen girls, whom Thadden hoped to train "strictly and fairly to (be) independently thinking, emancipated women."

The 1920s were also the time when the National Socialists were rising to prominence. By the time Thadden founded her school, Adolf Hitler had already been released from prison after the Beerhall Putsch, and the Nazis were gaining popularity. Thadden herself even found a certain appeal in Nazi ideas in the beginning, but she soon decided otherwise, and came to regard the Nazis' vision for Germany as one quite at odds with her own humanitarian views.

== Third Reich ==
After the Nazis came to power in 1933, tension between the authorities and Thadden's school began to grow. Thadden disregarded official edicts and continued to enroll Jewish girls at her school. She also kept seeing her Jewish friends. Thadden was also not shy about stating her views out loud, and for this reason she was ever more under the Gestapo's gaze. In October 1940, after the school had been evacuated to Tutzing in Bavaria because it was too near the French border, a pupil denounced the school to the Gestapo and the SD. Thadden decided to take the school back to Wieblingen, where she hoped that its widely acknowledged good name would keep such harassment away. It did not, however. In May 1941, the Education Ministry of Baden saw in Thadden's school "no satisfactory guarantee for a National-Socialist-aligned education", whereupon the school was nationalized.

Thadden went back to Berlin and joined the Red Cross as a nursing assistant. Here, according to her sister Ehrengard, she learnt, among other things, that letters reaching Germany from German prisoners of war in the Soviet Union had to be destroyed because Hitler believed that they would weaken morale at the front.

== Arrest and execution ==
Thadden developed contacts with opponents of the Nazi régime, including Helmut Gollwitzer, Martin Niemöller, and Elly Heuss-Knapp, and she also engaged in activities such as gathering food stamps for people in hiding and affording those threatened by the régime a chance to leave the country. In doing so she either underestimated how dangerous these activities were, or acted without regard for her own safety.

She also belonged to the Solf Circle, a group considered by the Nazis to be part of the German Resistance. Led by Johanna Susanne Elisabeth Dotti Solf and her daughter, So'oa'emalelagi Solf von Ballestremin, and much like the Trieglaffer Konferenzen of Thadden's youth, it attracted people from various walks of life with a variety of political views, who came to discuss pressing issues. At one such meeting on 10 September 1943, hosted by Elisabeth von Thadden, one of the guests was an assistant doctor named Paul Reckzeh, who, as it turned out, was a Gestapo informant. He had been sent by order of investigator Herbert Lange to make contact with the Solf Circle to find traitors to the Reich. His report to his Gestapo superiors was quite damning, leading the Gestapo to observe the participants to uncover their connections abroad. Over the next few months many were arrested, including Elisabeth von Thadden early on 12 January 1944, after she had moved to a post in Meaux in occupied France.

From Meaux she was brought to Paris and later to Berlin. There followed months of dreadful treatment and lengthy interrogations in various prisons and in the penal bunker at Ravensbrück concentration camp. On 1 July 1944, the Volksgerichtshof, presided over by Roland Freisler, sentenced Elisabeth von Thadden to death for conspiring to commit high treason and undermining the fighting forces (Wehrkraftzersetzung). Her niece Marianne Wellershof later wrote that during the trial Elisabeth "was very composed. Brutes and proles were a completely alien world to her. Thadden was treated horribly after the verdict; she always had her hands shackled behind her back and she could no longer do anything herself. One can imagine how her wrists must have looked, because she had metal shackles. I'm sure she was composed and self-possessed until her head was chopped off."

Her cousin Hans-Hasso von Veltheim provided her spiritual support in letters smuggled into her prison cell. Ten weeks later, on 8 September 1944, at 17:00, she was beheaded at Plötzensee Prison in Berlin.

Her last words were: "Put an end, Lord, to all our sufferings" quoted from Befiehl du deine Wege, a Lutheran hymn by Paul Gerhardt.

== Legacy ==
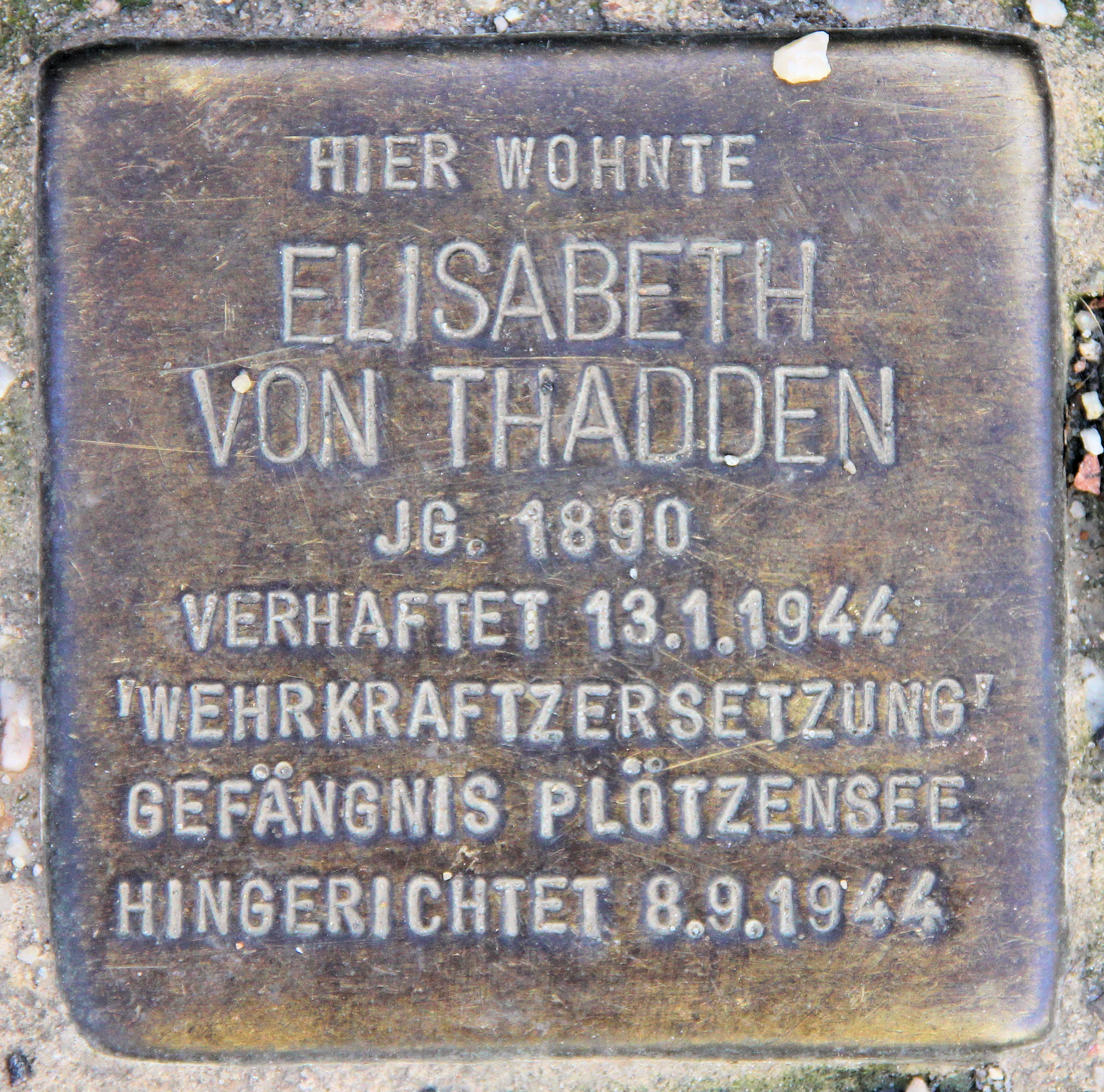
Stolperstein in Berlin-Charlottenburg

A doctor from Charité saw to it that Thadden's body was returned to her family for cremation. In 1949, the urn containing her ashes was entombed in the grounds of Schloss Wieblingen. The now renamed Elisabeth-von-Thadden-Schule, the school that she had founded in the 1920s, is once again a private school in Heidelberg-Wieblingen, although since 1982 it is now coeducational and since 1992 has ceased to be a boarding school. It does, however, retain a strong link with its founder's philosophy and her memory. The chapel "Redemptoris Mater" in the Vatican contains mosaics showing martyrs, including Elisabeth von Thadden.

== See also ==
- German Resistance

== Sources ==
- Riemenschneider, Matthias; Thierfelde, Jörg (2013). Elisabeth von Thadden, eine widerständige Christin, in: Manfred Gailus; Clemens Vollnhals (ed.), Mit Herz und Verstand: protestantische Frauen im Widerstand gegen die NS-Rassenpolitik, Göttingen: Unipress. ISBN 9783737001731
- Schwöbel, Marlene (2005). Elisabeth von Thadden (1890–1944), eine engagierte Pädagogin und Querdenkerin. In: Peter Zimmerling (ed.), Evangelische Seelsorgerinnen: biografische Skizzen, Texte und Programme, Göttingen: Vandenhoeck & Ruprecht
