= Paul Reckzeh =

Gestapo spy (1913–1996)

Paul Reckzeh (4 November 1913 in Berlin – 31 March 1996 in Hamburg) was a physician and Gestapo spy who at the end of 1943 betrayed the members of the Solf Circle, which he had joined while claiming to be a Swiss doctor. His betrayal led to the imprisonment and deaths of many Solf Circle members.

== Early life and education ==
Reckzeh was born in 1913, the son of medical professor Paul Reckzeh. He studied medicine from 1933 to 1939 and at the age of twenty, became member of the NSDAP. After he completed his studies in 1940, he was made an assistant doctor at a hospital in Birkenwerder. He also worked for the Reichsärztekammer and at the Reichsministerium für die besetzten Ostgebiete. In 1944 he became a Stabsarzt (Staff Surgeon) in the Todt Organisation. Since 1943 he had been working as a spy for the Gestapo, code named "Robby" and serving under Herbert Lange. In August 1943, he received an assignment to go to Switzerland to ascertain what kind of contacts German emigrants had with the Allies. It was through this work that he became aware of and made contact with members of the Solf Circle.

== Witness for the Volksgerichtshof ==
In the cases brought against Kiep and von Thadden before the Volksgerichtshof, Reckzeh served as the main witness. The following judgements were made:

- Elisabeth von Thadden was executed on 8 September 1944
- Otto Kiep was hanged on 26 August 1944
- Hilger van Scherpenberg was sentenced to two years imprisonment
- Irmgard Zarden was acquitted and released in July 1944 as there was not enough evidence
- Following the 20 July plot, more cases were brought against members of the Solf Circle and death sentences were handed out

== Post war life in the German Democratic Republic ==
Due to his co-operation and activities with the Gestapo, Reckzeh was arrested at the end of the war by SMERSH on 10 May 1945. He was first sent to NKVD special camp Nr. 6 in Frankfurt (Oder), then later moved to another camp in September 1945. In 1946, the administration of the Soviet occupation zone brought charges against Reckzeh, although the case was sent back to the Soviet Military Administration in Germany. Reckzeh had to wait until 1950 for the legal process to continue. By then he had spent time in camps at Mühlberg and Buchenwald. The GDR Minister of the Interior then brought charges against Reckzeh of acting as a spy who had caused harm to others due to their political opposition to Nazism. On 3 June 1950 Reckzeh was sentenced at the district court of Chemnitz to fifteen years imprisonment. However, he was released from prison under a partial amnesty in October 1952. After his release, he lived in East Germany and resumed practicing as a doctor. In 1978 he betrayed his daughter Barbara to the East German Stasi when she tried to flee to Hamburg.
