= Lagi von Ballestrem =

German resistance member (1909–1955)

Lagi von Ballestrem

So'oa'emalelagi Gräfin von Ballestrem (née Solf, 31 August 1909 – 14 September 1955) was a part of the German resistance to Nazism as a member of the Solf Circle. She was born in Vailima, German Samoa as the daughter of Wilhelm Solf, the German colonial governor, and Hanna Solf. Her Samoan birth name was typically abbreviated to Lagi.

== Biography ==
She lived in Shanghai with her first husband Wolfgang Mohr (married 1932) where she helped Jewish refugees. She returned to Berlin in 1938, at which time she was questioned by the Gestapo. Her first marriage ended in 1939; the following year she married Hubertus Graf von Ballestrem (1910-1995), son of Count Valentin Gustav Alexander Joseph Christian von Ballestrem (1860-1920) and his wife, Countess Agnes of Stolberg-Stolberg (1874-1940). Together with her mother Hanna, Lagi von Ballestrem planned escape routes for fleeing Jews and participated in secret meetings with other opponents of the Nazi regime. This group of intellectuals would later be known as the Solf Circle.

In 1939 von Ballestrem helped the gynaecologist and intellectual Ferdinand Mainzer and his family to escape to England.

The Solf Circle was betrayed to the Gestapo in late 1943, which led to its members being arrested. Ballestrem and her mother were transferred to Ravensbrück concentration camp. While many other members of the group were executed, Ballestrem and Solf were freed when the Red Army liberated Ravensbrück.

Her story in her own words is found in Eric Boehm's book We Survived, first published in 1949.
