= Solf Circle =

Group of anti-Nazi German intellectuals

The Solf Circle (German: Solf-Kreis) was an informal gathering of German intellectuals involved in the resistance against Nazi Germany. Most members were arrested and executed after attending a tea party in Berlin on 10 September 1943 at the residence of Elisabeth von Thadden. The group's downfall also ultimately led to the demise of the Abwehr in February 1944.

== Background ==
Hanna Solf was the widow of Dr. Wilhelm Solf, who served as Imperial Colonial Secretary before the outbreak of World War I and ambassador to Japan under the Weimar Republic and, like her husband, was a political moderate and anti-Nazi. After her husband's death in 1936 she had presided over a circle of anti-Nazi intellectuals in her salon in Berlin, reminiscent of the SeSiSo Club, together with her daughter, the Countess So'oa'emalelagi "Lagi" von Ballestrem-Solf. They included career officers from the Foreign Office, industrialists and writers, and they would meet regularly to discuss the war and relief for the Jews and political enemies of the regime; Solf and her daughter were responsible for hiding many Jews and providing them with documents for them to emigrate safely. They also had links with other anti-Nazi groups like the Kreisau Circle.

== The tea party and betrayal of the Solf Circle ==
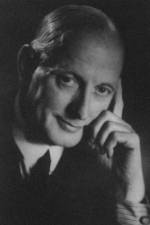
Otto Kiep

On 10 September 1943 the Solf Circle met at a birthday party given by Elisabeth von Thadden, the Protestant headmistress of a famous girls' school in Wieblingen, near Heidelberg. Among the guests were:

- Otto Kiep, a high official from the Foreign Office, who was once dismissed from his position as Consul General in New York City for attending a public luncheon in honor of Albert Einstein, but was able to get himself reinstated in the diplomatic service;
- the Countess Hannah von Bredow, the granddaughter of Otto von Bismarck;
- Count Albrecht von Bernstorff, the nephew of Count Johann Heinrich von Bernstorff, the German ambassador to the United States during World War I;
- Father Friedrich Erxleben, a well-known Jesuit priest;
- Nikolaus von Halem, a merchant; hanged for conspiracy to kill Hitler;
- Legation adviser Richard Kuenzer;
- State Secretary Arthur Zarden and his daughter Irmgard.

The following paragraphs are paraphrased from William Shirer's, "The Rise and Fall of the Third Reich":

To the party, Thadden brought a handsome Swiss doctor named Paul Reckzeh, who was said to be practising at the Charité Hospital in Berlin under Professor Ferdinand Sauerbruch. Like most Swiss, he expressed anti-Nazi sentiments in a discussion joined by others present, most vocal of which were Kiep and Bernstorff. Before the end of the party, Reckzeh offered to convey the correspondence of those present to their friends in Switzerland, an offer which many accepted. However, Reckzeh was actually an agent or informer working for the Gestapo, and he turned over these letters and reported on the gathering. Moreover Reckzeh was not in fact Swiss, but a German born in Berlin, and had only been sent by his spymasters to neutral Switzerland the previous year to gather intelligence on the various resistance networks active in Germany.

Helmuth James Graf von Moltke, a member of the Kreisau Circle, learned of this betrayal through a friend in the Air Ministry who had tapped a number of telephone conversations between Reckzeh and the Gestapo, and he quickly informed Kiep, who in turn informed the rest of the guests. They hurriedly fled for their lives, but it was too late, as Heinrich Himmler had his evidence. He waited four months to act on it, hoping to cast a wider net; apparently he succeeded, for on 12 January 1944 some seventy-four persons, including everyone who had been in the tea party, were arrested. The Solfs themselves fled to Bavaria and were caught by the Gestapo; they were then incarcerated in Ravensbrück concentration camp. Moltke himself was arrested at this time due to his connection with Kiep. But that was not the only consequence of Kiep's arrest - its repercussions spread as far as Turkey, and resulted in the final demise of the Abwehr, already under suspicion as a hotbed of anti-Nazi activity.

== The defection of Erich Vermehren and the dissolution of the Abwehr ==
Among Kiep's close friends were Erich Vermehren and his wife, the former Countess Elisabeth von Plettenberg. Vermehren, by profession a lawyer from Hamburg, was prevented from taking up a Rhodes scholarship in Oxford in 1938 because he repeatedly refused to join the Hitler Youth. Excluded from military service because of a childhood injury, he managed to get himself assigned to the Istanbul branch of the Abwehr. He also managed to get his wife to follow him, despite the Gestapo's efforts to detain her in Germany as a hostage.

When Kiep was arrested, the Vermehrens were summoned to Berlin by the Gestapo to be interrogated in connection with their friend's case. Knowing what would be in store for them, they got in touch with the British Secret Intelligence Service in February 1944, and were flown to Cairo and thence to England.

When the news of the defection broke – courtesy of British propaganda – it became the talk of Berlin. Although the Vermehrens did not bring any documents of any intelligence value or ciphers to the Allies, it was believed that they absconded with the Abwehr's secret codes and handed them over to the British.

Ultimately the capture of the Solf Circle and the subsequent defection of Vermehren exposed how the presence of Resistance agents and Allied spies had infiltrated within the Abwehr inner circle. This proved to be the last straw for Adolf Hitler. On 18 February he ordered that the Abwehr be dissolved and its functions taken over by the RSHA, under Himmler's jurisdiction. The disintegration of the Abwehr caused the resignation of hundreds of officers who took up positions elsewhere rather than serve the SS.

While the demise of the Abwehr was an unexpected but welcome boon to the Allies, it also deprived the German armed forces of an intelligence service of its own, and was a further blow to those among the anti-Nazi conspirators against Hitler who had also used the Abwehr's resources.

== The fate of some members of the Solf Circle ==
Most members of the Solf Circle were tried and convicted in Roland Freisler's Volksgerichtshof, and eventually executed. Kiep himself was subjected to severe torture; while he was being interrogated after his conviction, the Gestapo learned of his involvement with the 20 July Plot. He was executed in Plötzensee Prison on 15 August 1944. Elisabeth von Thadden also met the same fate on 8 September. Arthur Zarden, knowing what was in store for him and afraid to implicate others under torture, committed suicide on 18 January 1944 by throwing himself out a window at the Gestapo interrogation center. Irmgard Zarden (his daughter) spent five months in Ravensbrück concentration camp before being acquitted for lack of evidence.

Bernstorff was confined to Ravensbrück together with Solf and repeatedly tortured. He was then sent to the prison in Prinz Albrecht Straße to stand trial in the Volksgerichtshof. However, Roland Freisler did not have the satisfaction of sentencing him because he was killed in an air raid on 3 February 1945. When the Red Army liberated the prison on 25 April he was not among the living. Together with Richard Kuenzer, Bernstorff was taken out of the prison two days before to the vicinity of the Lehrter Bahnhof, and presumably shot upon the orders of Joachim von Ribbentrop, the Nazi Foreign Minister.

Nikolaus von Halem was arrested on 26 February 1942 and suffered through a number of prisons and concentration camps, including Sachsenhausen. In June 1944, shortly before the 20 July 1944 coup attempt, the People's Court indicted Halem for conspiracy to commit treason and undermining the war effort. He was sentenced to death and hanged on 9 October 1944.

== The fate of the Solfs ==
Solf and her daughter So'oa'emalelagi were interned in Ravensbrück after their arrest. In December 1944 they were transferred to Moabit Remand Prison while awaiting their trial in the Volksgerichtshof. The considerable delay in their trial was at least in part due to the efforts of the Japanese ambassador, Hiroshi Ōshima, who knew the Solfs. Their trial was further delayed because the same air raid that killed Freisler on 3 February 1945 also destroyed the dossier on the Solfs, which was in the files of the Volksgerichtshof. Nevertheless, they were finally scheduled to be tried on 27 April but they were released from Moabit on 23 April, apparently because of an error brought about by the confusion caused by the entry of the Red Army into Berlin.

After the war, Solf went to England while her daughter was reunited with her husband, Count Hubert Ballestrem, who was an officer in the Wehrmacht and lived in Berlin. Solf died on 4 November 1954 in Starnberg, Bavaria.

Countess von Ballestrem died on 4 December 1955 at the age of 46, her early death attributable to her incarceration.

== See also ==
- Anti-fascism
- Category:Members of the Solf Circle
- List of members of the 20 July plot
