= Hanna Solf =

German resistance member (1887–1954)

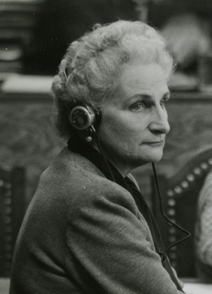
- Hanna Solf as a witness at the Nuremberg trials in 1947
- Born: Johanna Dotti; 14 November 1887; Neuhagen
- Died: 4 November 1954 (aged 66)
- Occupation: anti-fascist resistance member
- Known for: founder and member of Solf Circle

Johanna Susanne Elisabeth Solf (née Dotti, 14 November 1887 – 4 November 1954) was a member of the German resistance to Nazism and the founder of the Solf Circle group of intellectuals, opposed to the Nazi regime.

== Early life ==
Solf was born in 1887 in Neuhagen. Her father, Georg Leopold Dotti, was an industrialist and banker. She married Wilhelm Solf in 1908, who was then governor of German Samoa. Lagi von Ballestrem (born So'oa'emalelagi Solf in 1909) was their eldest child. Starting in 1928 they lived in Berlin, where Wilhelm died in 1936.

== Resistance to the Nazi regime ==
Hanna Solf and Elisabeth von Thadden frequently hosted tea parties for intellectuals opposed to the Nazi government, a group which would later be called Solf Circle (German: Solf-Kreis). They helped many victims of Nazi persecution to flee the country. Solf and her daughter sheltered Jewish families in their house and helped others find hiding places.

== Arrest and detention ==
In September 1943, Solf attended a tea party organised by Elisabeth von Thadden. The party was infiltrated by the Gestapo agent Paul Reckzeh. Members of the Solf circle were arrested as a consequence. Hanna Solf was detained on 12 January 1944 and ultimately brought to Ravensbrück concentration camp. While several members of the group were executed, Solf and her daughter were freed before their trial when the Red Army liberated Ravensbrück.

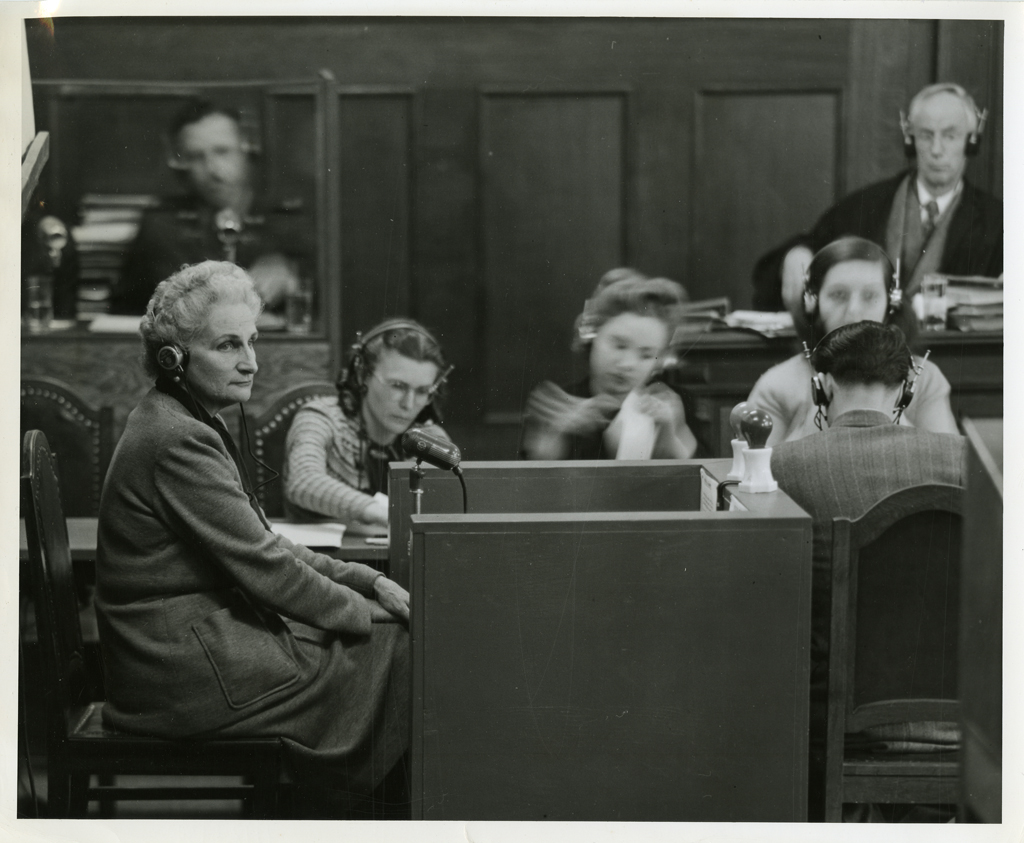
Hanna Solf as a prosecution witness at the Nuremberg trials (1947)

== Life after liberation ==
At her liberation from Ravensbrück, Solf weighed only 42 kilograms. She appeared as witness at the Nuremberg trials. Solf lived retired from social life at the Lake Starnberg, until her death in 1954. Her housekeeper Martha Richter was taking care of her. Richter had joined the Solf family in 1911 and lived with Solf and her daughter since then and through the war.
