= Wilhelm Solf =

German politician (1862–1936)

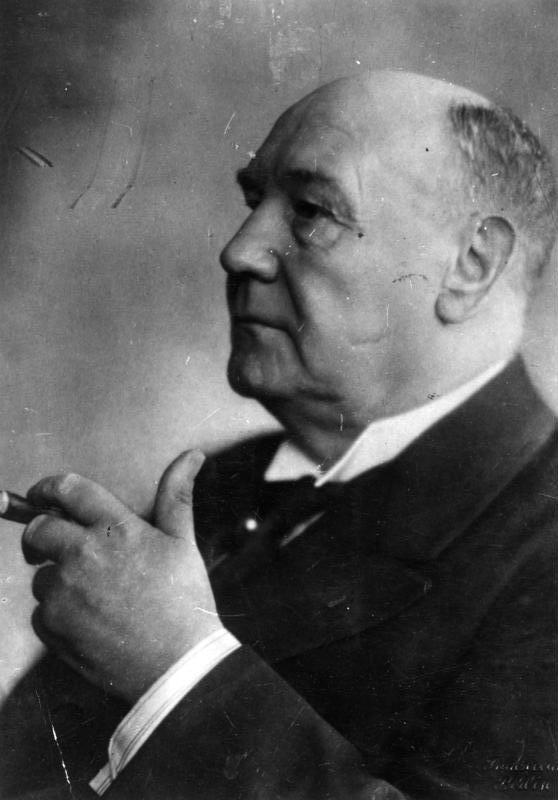
- Solf in 1911

German Ambassador to Japan
- In office 1 August 1920 – 16 December 1928
- President: Friedrich Ebert; Paul von Hindenburg
- Preceded by: Arthur von Rex
- Succeeded by: Ernst Arthur Voretzsch

State Secretary for Foreign Affairs
- In office 3 October 1918 – 13 December 1918
- Monarch: Wilhelm II (until 9 Nov. 1918)
- Chancellor: Max von Baden; Friedrich Ebert
- Preceded by: Paul von Hintze
- Succeeded by: Ulrich von Brockdorff-Rantzau

Secretary for the Colonies
- In office 20 December 1911 – 13 December 1918
- Monarch: Wilhelm II
- Preceded by: Friedrich von Lindequist
- Succeeded by: Philipp Scheidemann

Governor of German Samoa
- In office 1 March 1900 – 19 December 1911
- Monarch: Wilhelm II
- Preceded by: New office
- Succeeded by: Erich Schultz-Ewerth

Personal details
- Born: Wilhelm Heinrich Solf; 5 October 1862 Berlin, Kingdom of Prussia (now in Germany)
- Died: 6 February 1936 (aged 73) Berlin, Nazi Germany
- Party: German Democratic Party
- Spouse: Johanna Dotti
- Children: 4
- Occupation: Diplomat, politician
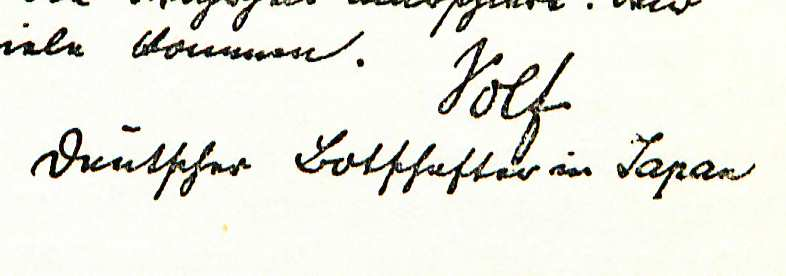
- Signature

Wilhelm Heinrich Solf (5 October 1862 – 6 February 1936) was a German scholar, diplomat, jurist and statesman.

== Early life ==
Solf was born into a wealthy and liberal family in Berlin. He attended secondary schools in Anklam, western Pomerania, and in Mannheim. He took up the study of Oriental languages, in particular Sanskrit, at universities in Berlin, Göttingen and Halle and earning a doctorate in philology in the winter of 1885. Under the supervision of the well-known Indologist Richard Pischel, Solf wrote an elementary grammar of Sanskrit.

Solf then found a position at the library of the University of Kiel. While residing there, he was drafted into the Imperial Navy to serve his military obligation. However, he was deemed medically unfit for military service and discharged.

== Early diplomatic career ==
Solf joined the German Foreign Office (Consular Service) on 12 December 1888 and was assigned to the Imperial German Consulate General in Calcutta on 1 January 1889. However, he resigned from the consular service after three years to study law at the University of Jena, where he obtained his doctorate in law (Doktor juris) in September 1896. Solf's advanced degrees qualified him for higher positions in the diplomatic service. He joined the Colonial Department of the Foreign Office (Kolonialabteilung des Auswärtigen Amtes) and in 1898 was assigned as district judge in Dar es Salaam in German East Africa for a short period. In 1899, he was posted to the Samoan Islands, where he served as council chairman in the provisional government of the municipality of Apia, Samoa.

== Governor of Samoa ==
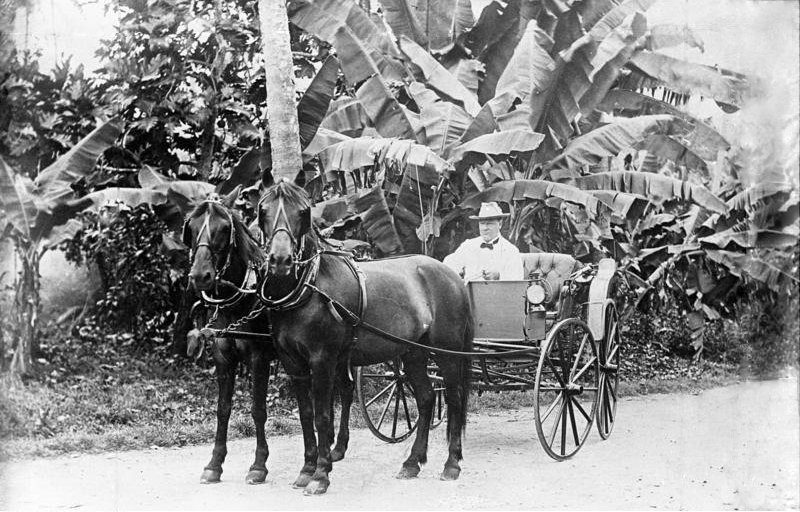
Solf in German Samoa, 1910

The division of the Samoan Islands as a result of the Tripartite Convention of 1899 assigned the western islands to Germany (independent Samoa today) and Eastern Samoa to the United States (American Samoa today). Wilhelm Solf, at age 38, became the first Governor of German Samoa on 1 March 1900. "Solf was a man of quite unusual talent, clear-thinking, sensitive to the nuances of Samoan attitudes and opinion." He was known as a liberal, painstaking and competent administrator. Solf included Samoan traditions in his government programs but never hesitated to step in assertively, including banishment from Samoa in severe cases, when his position as the Kaiser's deputy was challenged. Under Solf's direction, plantation agriculture was further encouraged, which in his judgment provided the soundest basis for the colony's economic development. In turn, tax revenues were enhanced, making the establishment of a public school system, the construction and the staffing of a hospital major successes. Road and harbour facilities development was accelerated. The Samoan colony was on its way to self-sufficiency and had reached that achievement just before Solf was called to Berlin and was succeeded by Erich Schultz as Governor of German Samoa.

== Later career ==
After his return from Samoa, Solf became (1911) Secretary (Staatssekretär) of the German Colonial Office (Reichskolonialamt) to 1918 and travelled extensively to the German protectorates in West and East Africa in 1912 and 1913. In the spring of 1914, Solf designed coats of arms for the various German colonies, a project which found enthusiastic favour with Wilhelm II, but his efforts were foiled by the outbreak of World War I a few months later, and the arms were never officially used. The outbreak of World War I caused Germany's colonial possessions to be invaded by the United Kingdom (including the dominions), Belgium, France and Japan.

Solf lobbied for a negotiated peace settlement in 1917 and 1918. He opposed the implementation of unrestricted submarine warfare, a policy that eventually contributed to the entry of the United States to the war in 1917.

With the defeat of Germany imminent and the likelihood of revolution growing, he was appointed as what turned out to be the last of the Imperial Foreign Ministers in October 1918. In that capacity, he undertook negotiations for the armistice that took effect on 11 November 1918.

He resigned his post as Foreign Minister on 13 December 1918 with the onset of the German Revolution after news about the payment of about 1-million Mark and a 10.5-million Russian ruble mandate for a bank account at Mendelssohn & Co by the Russian ambassador to Germany, Adolph Joffe, to the Independent Social Democratic Party of Germany politician Oskar Cohn had become public. Solf refused further co-operation with the USPD.

Between then and 1920, he served as Vice President of the Deutsche Kolonialgesellschaft. From 1920 to 1928, he served as the German chargé d'affaires and then ambassador to Japan; his tenure proved to be fruitful, as he was instrumental in restoring good relations between the two World War I enemies, which culminated in the signing of the German-Japanese Treaty of 1927. On Solf's return to Germany and his retirement from government service, he became the Chairman of the Board of the Deutsches Ausland-Institut based in Stuttgart.

Solf held centrist political views and joined the German Democratic Party (Deutsche Demokratische Partei). However, with its dissolution in 1933, he planned with others to form a new moderate party. With the Nazi reality of that time, it was unsuccessful, if not impossible. In 1932, he supported the re-election of retired Field Marshal Paul von Hindenburg as German President.

Solf wrote Weltpolitik und Kolonialpolitik (Foreign policy and colonial policy, 1918) and Kolonialpolitik, Mein politisches Vermächtniss (Colonial policy, my political legacy, 1919).

== Personal life ==
In 1908 Wilhelm Solf married Johanna Dotti; their children were:

- daughter So'oa'emalelagi Solf (known as Lagi), born in Samoa in 1909 (d. 14 Dec 1955). Her Samoan name translates as "she who has come from heaven".
- son Hans Heinrich Solf (21 Dec 1910 - 18 Feb 1987)
- son Wilhelm Herman Solf (11 Jan 1915 - August 1983)
- son Otto Isao Solf (25 Dec 1921 - 12 Aug 1989)

Solf's widow Johanna (Hanna) and his daughter Lagi hosted the anti-Nazi Frau Solf Tea Party get-togethers.

== Bibliography ==
- Davidson, J. W. Samoa mo Samoa [Samoa for the Samoans], The Emergence of the Independent State of Western Samoa. Melbourne: Oxford University Press. 1967.
- Gray, J.A.C. Amerika Samoa, A History of American Samoa and Its United States Naval Administration. Annapolis: United States Naval Institute. 1960.
- McKay, C.G.R. Samoana, A Personal Story of the Samoan Islands. Wellington and Auckland: A.H. & A.W. Reed. 1968.
- Ryden, George Herbert. The Foreign Policy of the United States in Relation to Samoa. New York: Octagon Books, 1975. (Reprint by special arrangement with Yale University Press. Originally published at New Haven: Yale University Press, 1928)

Government offices
| New title | Governor of German Samoa; 1900–1911 | Succeeded by Erich Schultz-Ewerth |
Political offices
| Preceded by Friedrich von Lindequist | Secretary for the Colonies; 1911–1918 | Succeeded by Philipp Scheidemann |
| Preceded by Paul von Hintze | Secretary of State for Foreign Affairs; 1918 | Succeeded by Count Ulrich von Brockdorff-Rantzau |
Diplomatic posts
| Preceded by Arthur von Rex | German Ambassador to Japan; 1920–1928 | Succeeded by Ernst Arthur Voretzsch |
