= May 1943 =

Month of 1943

<<	May 1943					>>
Su	Mo	Tu	We	Th	Fr	Sa
						1
2	3	4	5	6	7	8
9	10	11	12	13	14	15
16	17	18	19	20	21	22
23	24	25	26	27	28	29
30	31

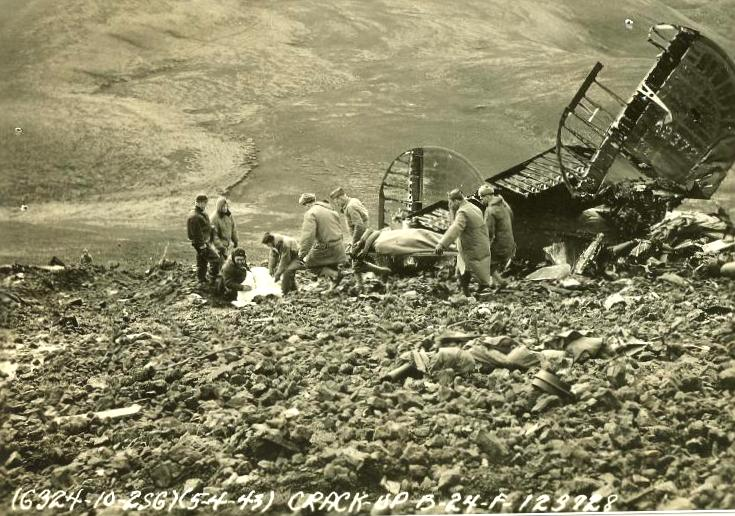
May 3, 1943: Plane crash kills General Frank M. Andrews, Commander of U.S. Army operations in Europe

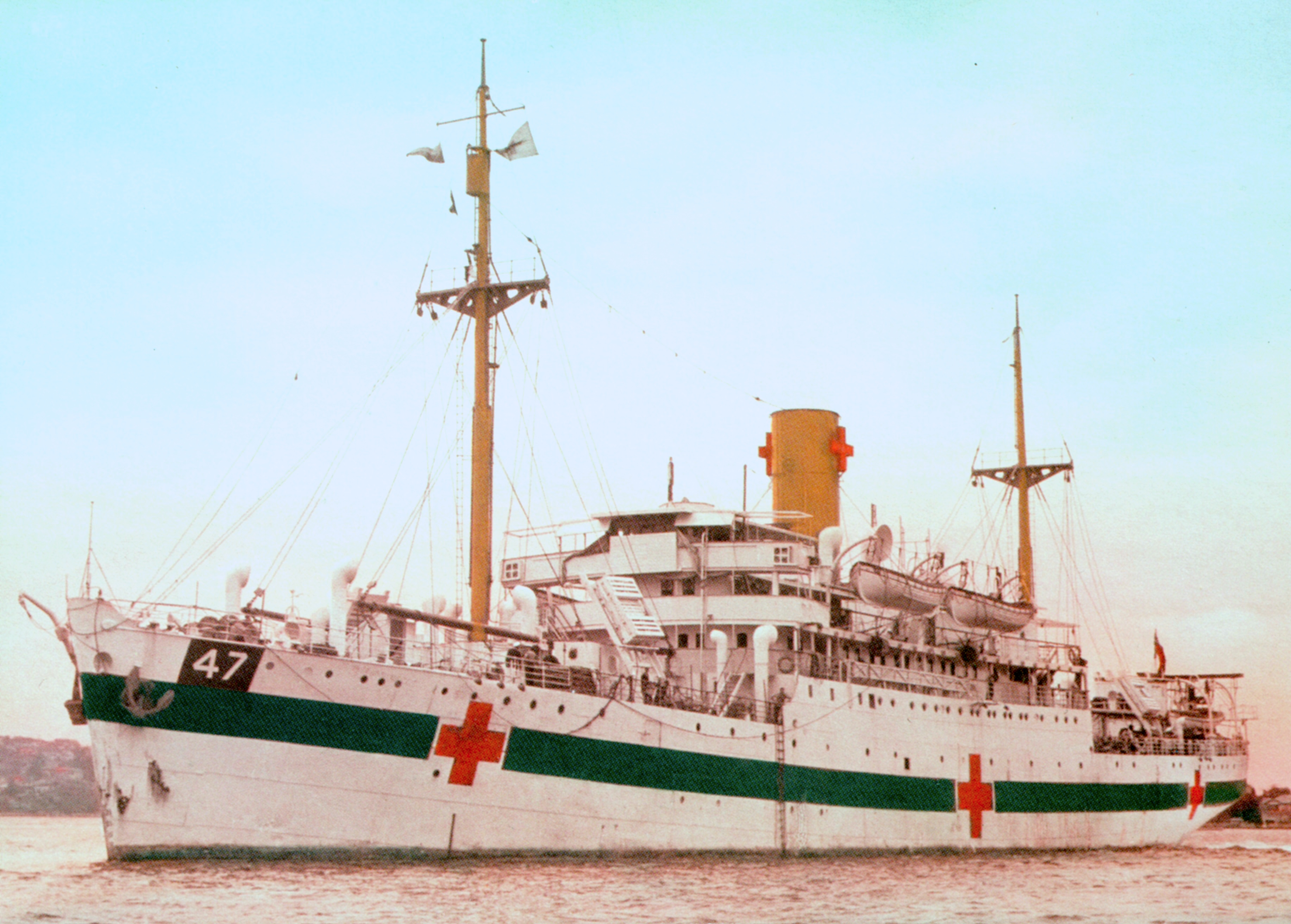
May 14, 1943: Australian hospital ship Centaur sunk by Japanese sub, 268 medical personnel killed

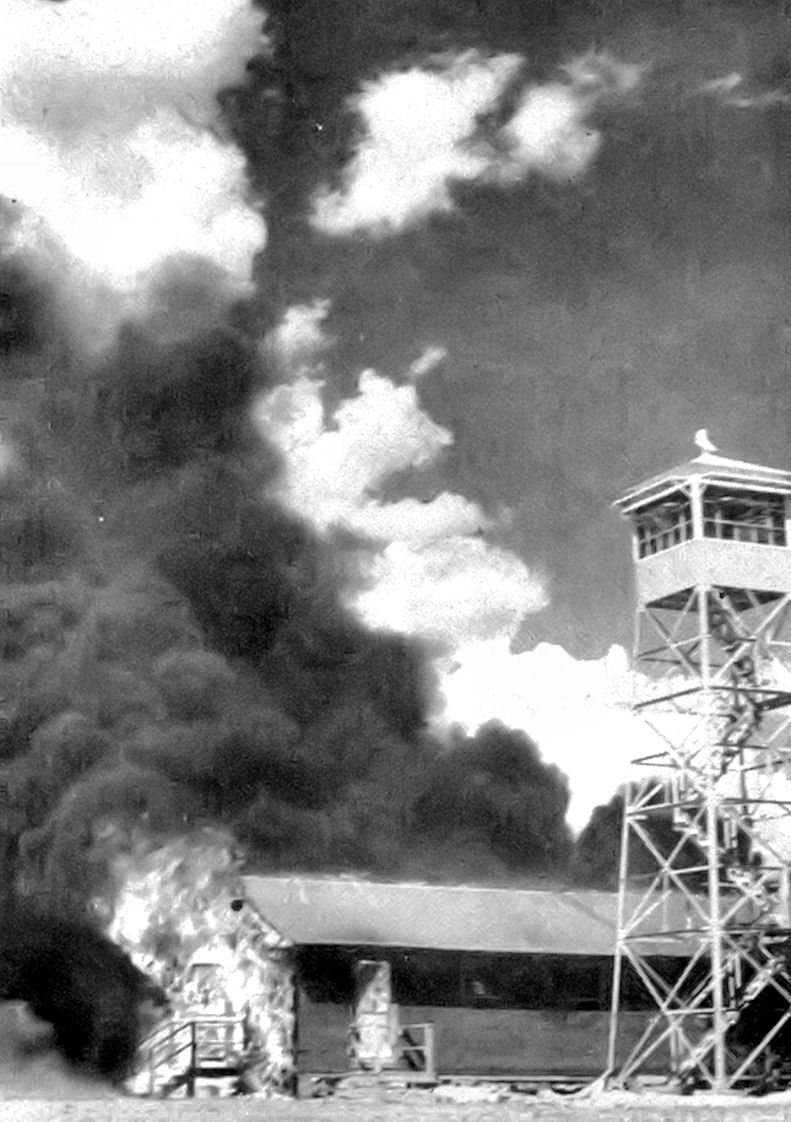
May 15, 1943: "Bat bomb" experiment sets fire to Carlsbad Army Air Force base

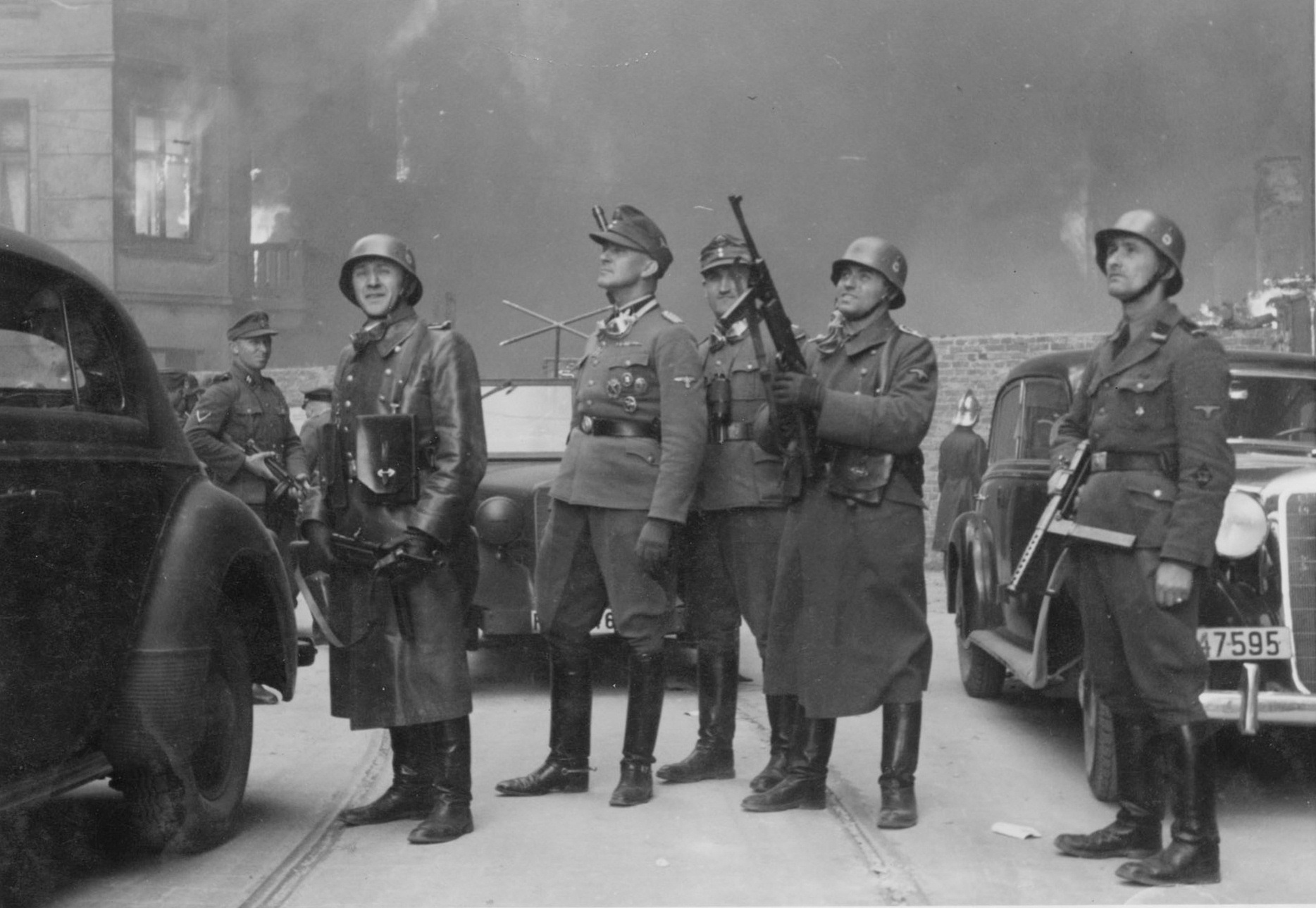
May 16, 1943: SS Polizeifuhrer Stroop announces final eradication of Warsaw's Jewish quarter and its 56,065 residents

The following events occurred in May 1943:

== May 1, 1943 (Saturday) ==
- More than 480,000 American coal miners walked off of the job a minute after midnight, when the United Mine Workers' contract with the nation's mining companies expired. U.S. President Roosevelt notified UMWA President John L. Lewis to cease the wartime work stoppage by 10:00 am, an order which was ignored, and then issued an Executive Order directing that "The Secretary of the Interior is authorized and directed to take immediate possession so far as may be necessary or desirable, of any and all mines producing coal in which a strike or stoppage has occurred or is threatened ...". At the time, there was only a three-week supply of coal for American steel manufacturers and ten days' supply for some railroads. The strike would resume on June 1.
- The sinking of the British troopship Erinpura by German bombers, north of Benghazi, killed 942 people. One of the bombs struck a hold full of ammunition, and the ship went down in four minutes, taking with it Erinpura 's 114 crew and five gunners, along with 822 troops being transported, of whom more than 600 were African troops from Basutoland (now Botswana), 140 Jewish soldiers from Palestine and 54 sailors from British India.
- In Tunisia, the four-day Battle of Hill 609 ended as the U.S. Army's II Corps drove Germany's Afrika Korps from a strategic position. An author would note that the battle, the first clear cut victory of U.S. forces in the North African Campaign, was "the American Army's coming-of-age."
- The Ford Motor Company fired 141 employees, mostly African-American, from its aluminum and steel plants in River Rouge, Michigan, because of labor disputes.
- Count Fleet won the Kentucky Derby.
- Born: Ian Dunn, Scottish gay and paedophile rights activist; in Glasgow (d. 1998)

== May 2, 1943 (Sunday) ==
- The top secret project of deception code-named Operation Mincemeat continued at the Spanish town of Huelva, where a funeral was held for Major William Martin of Britain's Royal Marines, whose body had washed ashore on April 30. Major Martin was, in reality, a homeless Welshman named Glyndwr Michael, who had died on January 28 and whose body was used to deceive German intelligence regarding the starting point for an Allied invasion.
- U.S. President Roosevelt went on nationwide radio to talk about the need to end the coal strike, then directed his comments to the strikers themselves, saying "You miners have sons in the Army and Navy and Marine Corps ... I only wish I could tell you what they think of the stoppage of work in the coal mines."
- A group of 25 Japanese bombers and 27 Zero fighters carried out a raid on Darwin in Australia's Northern Territory that was defended by 33 Australian Spitfire fighter planes and a battery of anti-aircraft guns. As a result of the defense, Japan lost more than six aircraft and the damage to the city of Darwin was minimal.
- The German submarine U-465 was sunk in the Bay of Biscay by a Short Sunderland of No. 461 Squadron RAAF, with the loss of all 48 of its crew.
- Born: Mustafa Nadarevic, Yugoslav and Bosnian actor and comedian; in Banja Luka, Yugoslavia (now Boxnia) (d. 2020)
- Died: Viktor Lutze, 52, Chief of Staff for the SA Sturmabteilung, died one day after being fatally injured in a single car accident near Michendorf

== May 3, 1943 (Monday) ==
- The United States Supreme Court invalidated, 5–4, a city ordinance in Jeannette, Pennsylvania that required members of the Jehovah's Witnesses religious denomination to pay for a peddlers license in order to distribute religious literature. The city ordinance required each individual distributor to pay $10 per day. The ruling, in Murdock v. Pennsylvania, invalidated similar ordinances in Alabama, Arizona and Kansas as a violation of the constitutional guarantees of freedom of religion.
- Died: U.S. Army Lieutenant General Frank Maxwell Andrews, 59, Commander of U.S. Forces in Europe, was killed in the crash of a B-24 bomber during bad weather in Iceland, along with 13 others aboard in an accident with only one survivor; Andrews Air Force Base, near Washington, D.C., was named in his honor.

== May 4, 1943 (Tuesday) ==
- A bill to eliminate federal income tax for all Americans for an entire year failed to pass the U.S. House of Representatives by a margin of four votes, 202 to 206. The legislation, based on ideas proposed by New York Federal Reserve Bank chairman Beardsley Ruml, was replaced by a "pay as you go" Robertson-Forand bill that virtually eliminated the 1942 income taxes for 90% of Americans.
- The Battle of the Campobasso Convoy, fought off Tunisia's Cape Bon between three Royal Navy destroyers and the Italian Navy torpedo boat Perseo ended 90 minutes after it had started the night before. Britain sustained no losses, but the Italian merchant ship Campobasso was sunk with the loss of 73 of its 93 crew, and Perseo sank with 133 of its 216 crew.
- The German submarine U-109 was sunk with the loss of all 52 of its crew in the Atlantic Ocean by a B-24 Liberator of No. 86 Squadron RAF.
- The German submarines U-439 and U-659 collided with each other west of Cape Ortegal, Spain, and both sank. U-659 lost 44 of its 47 crew, and U-439 lost 40 men with only nine survivors.
- Died: Géo André, 53, French Olympic silver medalist in the high jump in 1908, was killed in action in Tunisia.

== May 5, 1943 (Wednesday) ==
- The Vatican Secretary of State sent a request to the government of the Nazi-controlled Slovak Republic, requesting the exclusion of Jews "who have entered the Catholic religion" from the list of persons to be deported to Nazi concentration camps. The office of Prime Minister Vojtech Tuka gave its response on May 28, pledging that converts would be kept in local concentration camps, separate from other Jews, "and given every opportunity to fulfill their Christian religion."
- The Battle of West Hubei began in China as Japanese forces (some 120,000 men) of the 11th Army under General Isamu Yokoyama started an offensive in western Hubei province, south of the Yangtze River, against defensive positions of the Chinese National Revolutionary Army. The battle would last for more than five weeks, ending on June 11 in a victory for the Chinese defenders, who had more than 25,000 troops killed or missing, while the Japanese sustained 771 killed.
- The German submarine U-638 was depth charged and sunk northeast of Newfoundland by the British corvette HMS Sunflower, with the loss of its entire crew of at least 44.
- Born: Michael Palin, British comedian; in Sheffield

== May 6, 1943 (Thursday) ==
- Admiral Ernest J. King, the U.S. Chief of Naval Operations, ordered the creation of Naval Combat Demolition Units, after the success, in September, of a group of U.S. Navy divers who had destroyed nets that had prevented American ships from entering Morocco's Sebou River.
- Five German submarines (U-125, U-192, U-438, U-531, and U-630) were sunk after sinking 12 ships from Convoy ONS 5 in the last major North Atlantic U-boat "wolfpack" attack of the war. U-125s crew scuttled their damaged boat, but the British ships Snowflake and Sunflower were not authorized to pick up survivors and all 54 men on U-125 died after deliberately sinking their own vessel. U-192 lost all 55 of its crew, U-438 was depth-charged with no survivors from its crew of at least 44, U-531 lost all 54 crew, U-630 had no survivors from a crew of at least 44 after being depth-charged by HMS Vidette.
- Born: Andreas Baader, West German militant and leader of the Red Army Faction, known as the Baader-Meinhof Gang; in Munich (d. 1977)

== May 7, 1943 (Friday) ==
- Tunis and Bizerte were liberated by Allied troops, with Bizerte falling to the Americans at 4:15 pm local time, and the Tunisian capital being conquered five minutes later by the British First Army.
- Sex symbol and film star Mae West was granted a final divorce from her husband, Frank Szatkus, whom she had married on April 29, 1911. The couple had been separated for more than thirty years.
- The German submarines U-447 and U-663 were depth charged and sunk by Allied aircraft in the eastern Atlantic and Bay of Biscay, respectively. There were no survivors from either U-447 or U-663, which each had at least 44 crew.
- Born: Peter Carey, Australian novelist; in Bacchus Marsh, Victoria
- Died: Fethi Okyar, 63, Prime Minister of Turkey from 1924 to 1925

== May 8, 1943 (Saturday) ==
- The U.S. Joint Chiefs of Staff approved the recommendations contained in the Strategic Plan for the Defeat of Japan, with the objective of the unconditional surrender of the Japanese Empire.
- Three Japanese destroyers were sunk on the same day. The Kagerō was bombed and sunk southwest of Rendova by American aircraft with the loss of 18 of her 239 crew. The Kuroshio struck a mine and sank near Kolombangara in the Solomon Islands with 83 of her 240 crew. and the Oyashio was disabled by a mine and then sunk by aircraft near Kolombangara with the loss of 91 lives of its 239 crew.
- Count Fleet won the Preakness Stakes.
- The Western film The Ox-Bow Incident starring Henry Fonda premiered in New York City.
- Died: Mordechai Anielewicz, 24, Jewish leader of the Warsaw Ghetto Uprising. Anielewicz, head of the resistance group Żydowska Organizacja Bojowa, apparently killed himself after the Nazi SS surrounded the ZOB command post at 18 Miła Street in Warsaw.

== May 9, 1943 (Sunday) ==
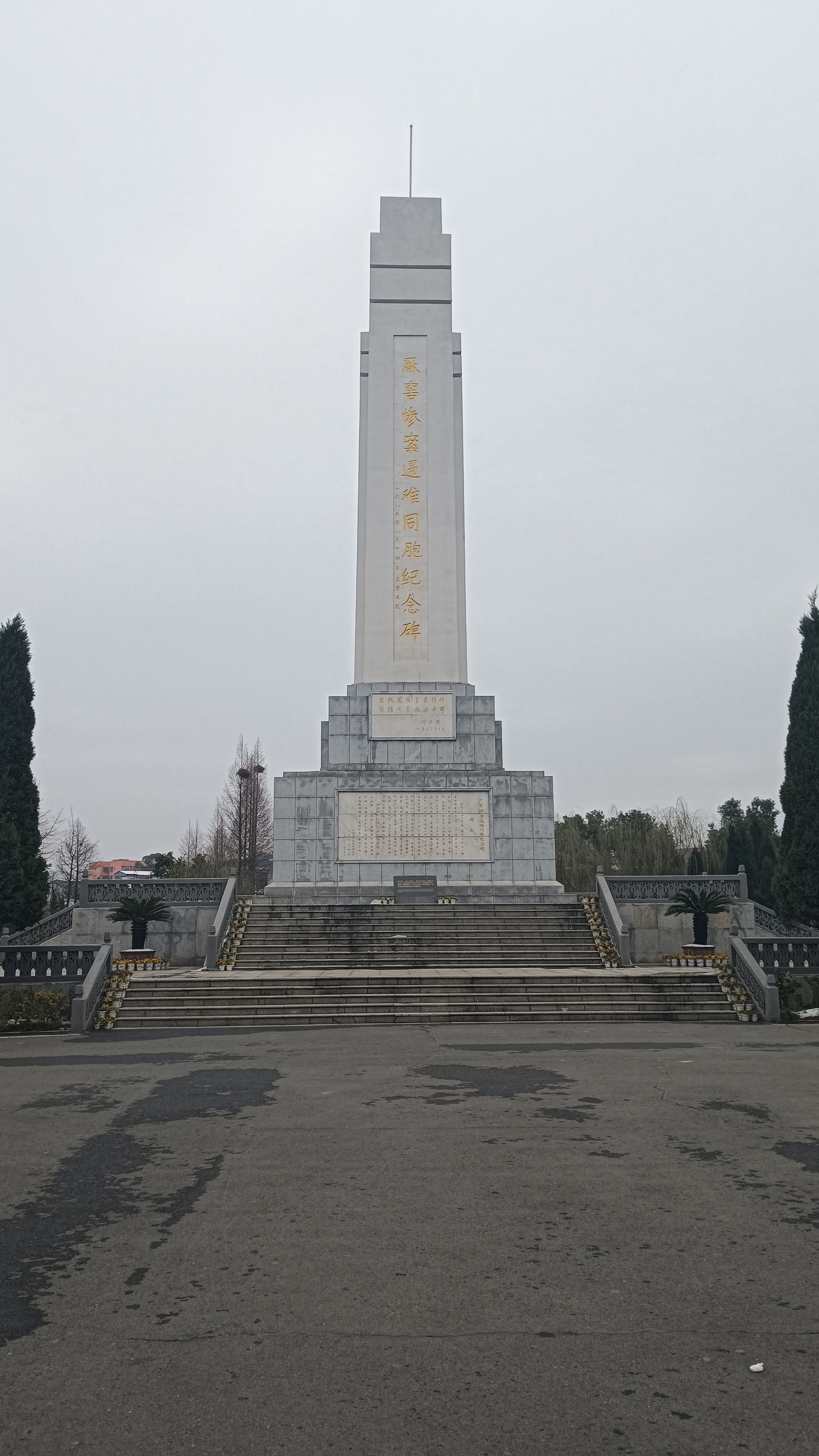
The memorial to the victims of the massacre in Changjiao

- The Changjiao massacre began in China's Hunan province at Changjiao as the Imperial Japanese Army's Shina hakengun expeditionary force, commanded by General Shunroku Hata began the killing of at least 25,000 Chinese civilians and 5,000 soldiers. Specifically, at least 7,000 residents of Changjiao and 12,000 refugees who had fled there were killed, while another 6,000 died outside the town, along with 5,000 members of the Kuomintang's 73rd Corps and other units.
- Francisco Franco, the fascist dictator of Spain, which remained neutral during World War II, spoke in favor of world peace, "declaring that neither the Axis nor the Allies could destroy the other". Franco, who had won the Spanish Civil War with assistance from both Germany and Italy, spoke in the city of Almería as the Axis powers were surrendering to the Allies in North Africa.
- A Junkers Ju 88 fitted with the new Lichtenstein radar set was secretly flown from Norway to Scotland by a crew of defectors possibly led by a British intelligence agent. The analysis of this new advanced equipment and other data about the tactics of German night-fighters would be vital to the Allies.
- Died: Wilmeth Sidat-Singh, 25, African-American college football and basketball star and member of the Tuskegee Airmen, was killed after the engine of his plane failed during a training mission in the U.S., when his parachute was tangled in his plane as it sank in Lake Huron in Michigan.

== May 10, 1943 (Monday) ==
- On the day that the Enabling Act of 1933 was set to expire by its terms, Adolf Hitler signed an order extending his dictatorship indefinitely. Published in the Reich Law Gazette, the decree stated "The Reich government will continue to exercise the powers bestowed on it by virtue of the law of March 24, 1933. I reserve for myself the obtaining of a confirmation of these powers of the Reich government by the Greater German Reichstag," although the German parliament was never called back into session by Hitler again.
- Hitler approved Operation Citadel, the attack on the Kursk salient, for June.
- To mark the tenth anniversary of the Nazi book burnings in Germany, the 300 largest libraries in the United States flew their flags at half-mast.
- Born: Dick Darman, Director of the U.S. Office of Management and Budget 1989–1993; in Charlotte, North Carolina (d. 2008)

== May 11, 1943 (Tuesday) ==
- An assault force of 3,000 troops from the 7th U.S. Infantry Division invaded Attu in the Aleutian Islands, in an attempt to expel occupying Japanese forces. The island, part of Alaska, had been renamed Atsuta by Japan, and was a supply point for the Aleutian island of Kiska, still in use by Japan for a submarine operating base.
- U.S. Secretary of the Navy Frank Knox inadvertently gave a clue that Allied forces intended to use Sicily for an invasion of Europe, potentially undermining the British disinformation campaign of Operation Mincemeat to convince German intelligence that the attack would be made from Greece and Sardinia. Ironically, Knox's comment that "Possession of Sicily by the Allies would obviously be a tremendous asset" was interpreted as an obviously clumsy attempt at deception, which Nazi Propaganda Minister Joseph Goebbels would describe as "baseless rumors and attempts at a smoke screen".
- The German submarine U-528 was sunk in the Atlantic Ocean by a British aircraft and Royal Navy sloop Fleetwood. While 11 men were killed, there were 43 survivors, including Reimar Lüst, who would become director of the European Space Agency in 1984.

== May 12, 1943 (Wednesday) ==
- TRIDENT, the first wartime conference between U.S. President Roosevelt and UK Prime Minister Churchill, began in Washington, D.C., and continued for 16 days. Churchill and his entourage had arrived in Washington from New York the night before after being secretly transported across the North Atlantic Ocean on the RMS Queen Mary.
- Colonel General Hans-Jürgen von Arnim and General Giovanni Messe, commanders, respectively, of the German Army and the Italian Army in North Africa, both surrendered themselves to the Allies, although Arnim refused to sign terms of unconditional surrender of German forces. Arnim and many of his troops had been cornered at the Cape Bon peninsula in Tunisia, near the town of Ste. Marie du Zit, by the 4th Indian Division of the British forces.
- The Battle of West Hubei began during the Second Sino-Japanese War.
- Maliq Bushati, the figurehead Prime Minister of Albania during Italian occupation, was replaced by Eqrem Libohova.
- The German submarines U-89 (with 48 crew) and U-186 (with 53 crew) were both sunk in the Atlantic Ocean. by Allied forces, with no survivors on either U-Boat.
  - The German submarine U-456 (with at least 48 crew) Most notably, U-456 was damaged by the new Fido homing torpedo dropped by a B-24 of No. 86 Squadron RAF before being finished off by the British destroyer Opportune.
- The Japanese submarine I-31 was sunk off of the coast of Alaska, near Attu Island, by the destroyer USS Edwards.
- Died: Szmul Zygielbojm, 48, Jewish Polish politician, died from an overdose of pills while in exile in London. His suicide note closed with the words, "having failed to achieve success in my life, I hope that my death may jolt the indifference of those who, perhaps even in this extreme moment, could save the Jews who are still alive in Poland".

== May 13, 1943 (Thursday) ==
- The North African Campaign came to an end after nearly three years, as the 164th Infantry Division of Germany's Afrika Korps laid down its weapons and its commander, Major General Kurt Freiherr von Liebenstein became the last of the Axis officers to surrender in Africa. The commanding British Field Marshal, Sir Harold Alexander, sent word to Prime Minister Churchill, saying that "It is my duty to report that the Tunis campaign is over. All enemy resistance has ceased." During the week, 150,000 Germans and Italians became prisoners of war of the Allies. Between June 11, 1940 and the end of the campaign, the fighting killed 35,478 British troops; killed or wounded 16,000 fighters from Free France; left 9,243 Americans dead or missing; killed 22,341 Italian troops; and 18,594 German troops (with 3,400 others missing)
- The German submarine U-753 was depth charged and sunk in the Atlantic Ocean by a Short Sunderland of No. 423 Squadron RCAF and two ships, with no survivors from the crew of 47.
- The comedy film The More the Merrier starring Jean Arthur, Joel McCrea and Charles Coburn (who won an Oscar for Best Supporting Actor), and directed by George Stevens (who won an Oscar for the film) was released.

== May 14, 1943 (Friday) ==
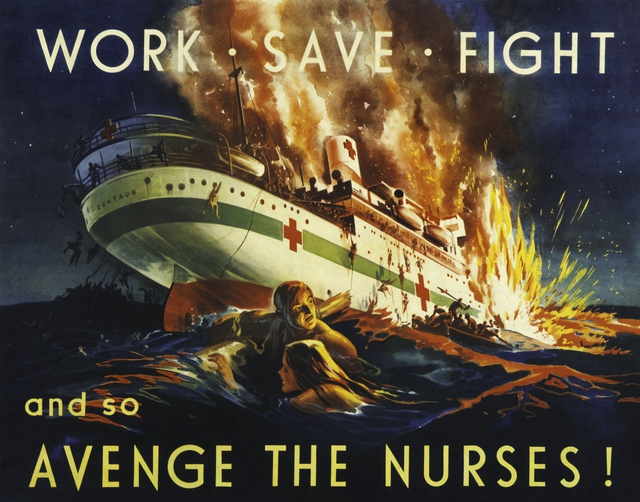
AHS Centaur

- The AHS Centaur, an Australian hospital ship, was torpedoed and sunk near North Stradbroke Island, off of the coast of Queensland, by Japanese submarine I-177, killing 268 of the 363 persons on board. There were no patients on board at the time, but the ship was carrying 245 Australian and British medical personnel.
- The German submarine U-235 was sunk at Kiel in an American air raid, with all 46 crew killed. U-235, along with U-237 and U-238 were all sunk in harbor, but would all be raised, repaired and returned to service.
- The Japanese submarine Ro-102 was sunk in the Pacific Ocean by two American patrol boats, with the loss of all 42 crew.Hackett, Bob; Kingsepp, Sander (2017). "IJN Submarine RO-102: Tabular Record of Movement". combinedfleet.com.
- The German submarine U-640 was depth charged and sunk off Cape Farewell, Greenland by an American PBY Catalina with the loss of its entire crew of at least 44 men.
- The U.S. Public Roads Administration reported that only a few states were observing the 35 mile per hour speed limit that had been imposed nationally during wartime, with vehicles traveling as fast as 45 mph in Minnesota.
- Born:
  - Ólafur Ragnar Grímsson, President of Iceland from 1996 to 2016; in Ísafjörður
  - Jack Bruce, Scottish musician and songwriter; in Bishopbriggs, Lanarkshire (d. 2014)

== May 15, 1943 (Saturday) ==
- Sidi Muhammad VII al-Munsif, the Bey of Tunis, was forced to abdicate by France's General Henri Giraud. Replacing al-Munsif was his son, Muhammad VIII al-Amin. Two days later, the al-Munsif would be put on a ship and sent to Madagascar, along with his harem of 25 wives. The Bey had elected to remain in Tunis after the Axis occupation began and had collaborated with the German authorities, who had made him a figurehead King of Tunisia.
- At an airbase at Carlsbad, New Mexico, Dr. Louis Fieser, the chemist who had developed napalm, conducted the first test of the experimental "bat bomb", with a timed 0.6 ounce explosive attached to a Mexican free-tailed bat. After a demonstration with dummy bombs showed that the bats would, as planned, seek shelter in buildings, Dr. Fieser attached live explosives to six dormant bats for a demonstration in front of cameras. The bats woke up before detonation, then flew towards the wooden control tower, barracks, and other buildings and set a fire that destroyed much of the base.
- The Third Communist International of the Soviet Union dissolved and ceased operations.
- The Irish-operated steamship Irish Oak was torpedoed and sunk in the Atlantic Ocean by German submarine U-607 despite sailing as a clearly marked neutral vessel.
- The German submarines U-176, which had sunk 11 freighters, was depth charged and sunk with the loss of its crew of 48 by a Cuban Navy patrol boat, CS-13., and the U-266 was sunk with the loss of all 47 crew by the Royal Air Force No. 58 Squadron.
- Operation Checkmate in Norway ended with all seven British commandos being captured after managing to sink one German minesweeper, M 5207. Rather than being treated as prisoners of war with the rights agreed to by the Geneva Convention, the men were sent to a concentration camp, where one died of typhus and the other six were executed.
- Died: Horst Hannig, 21, German Luftwaffe fighter ace credited with 98 aerial victories, was shot down during a dogfight with Royal Air Force fighters over northwest France near Rocquancourt in the Calvados département, and was killed when his parachute failed to open after he bailed out.

== May 16, 1943 (Sunday) ==
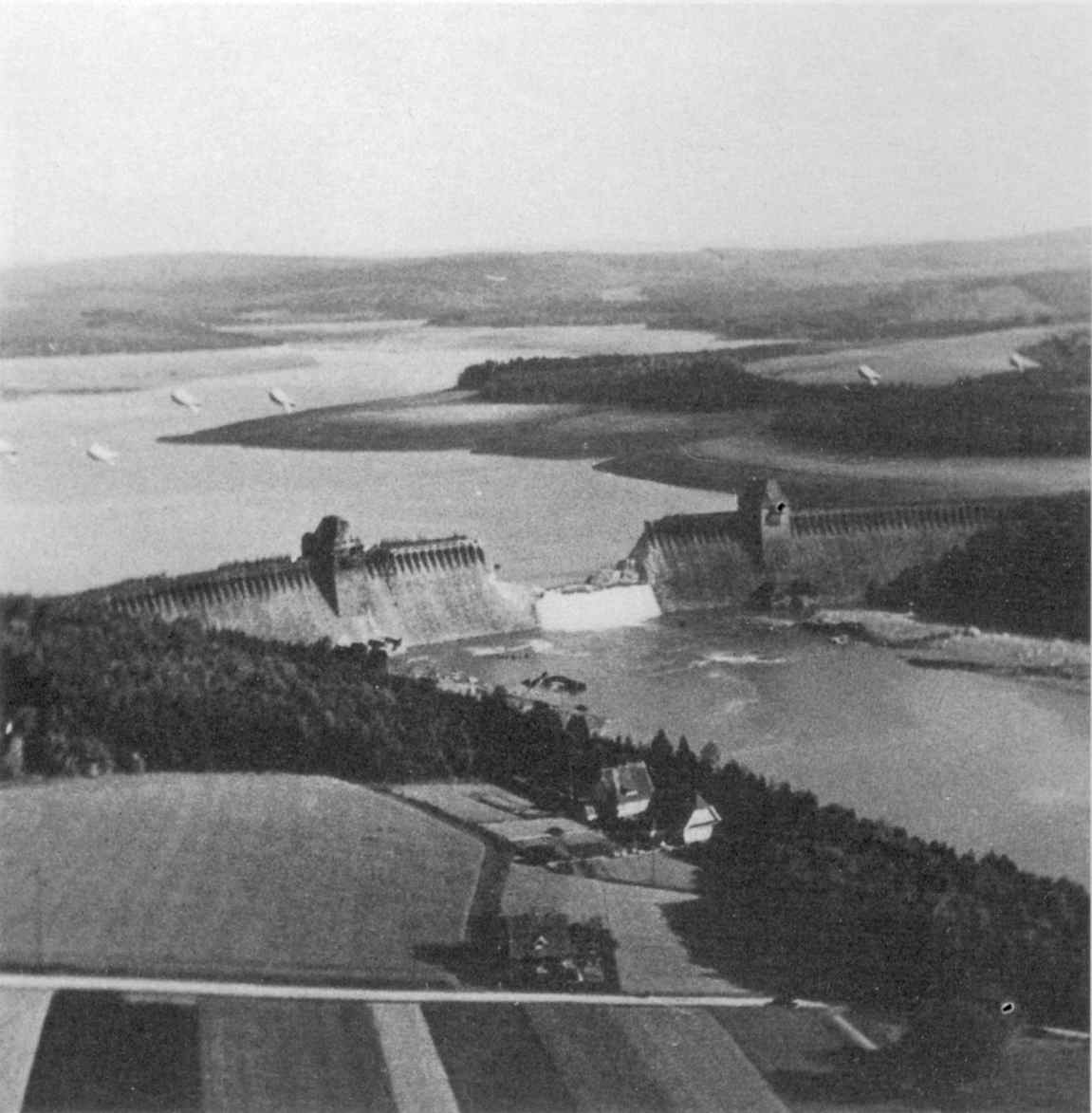
The Möhne Dam

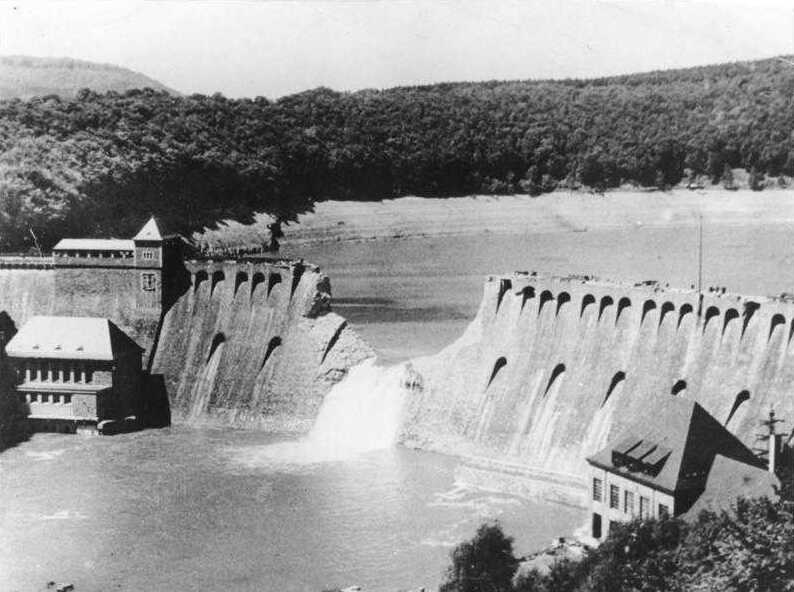
The Eder Dam

- Operation Chastise was carried out by nineteen bombers of the Royal Air Force on German dams in the Ruhr valley industrial region, causing massive flooding and loss of life. The Möhne River dam and the Eder dam contained two-thirds of the water stored for the Ruhr basin. German radio reported that at least 711 people were confirmed dead, and claimed that 341 of them had been Allied prisoners of war. "That night", German Armaments Minister Albert Speer would write later, "employing just a few bombers, the British came close to a success which would have been greater than anything they had achieved hitherto with a commitment of thousands of bombers. But they made a single mistake which puzzles me to this day: They divided their forces and that same night destroyed the Eder Valley dam, although it had nothing whatsoever to do with the supply of water to the Ruhr."
- The end of the Warsaw Ghetto Uprising was complete as SS Polizeifuhrer Jürgen Stroop sent his triumphant dispatch to Berlin, announcing that "The former Jewish quarter of Warsaw is no longer in existence. The large-scale action was terminated at 2015 hours by blowing up the Warsaw Synagogue ... Total number of Jews dealt with 56,065 including both Jews caught and Jews whose extermination can be proved." The operation had been commenced on April 19.
- The German submarine U-182 was sunk near Madeira by the destroyer USS MacKenzie with the loss of all 61 crew and three Allied prisoners of war, while the U-463 was sunk with all 57 crew killed in the Bay of Biscay by a Handley Page Halifax of No. 58 Squadron RAF.

== May 17, 1943 (Monday) ==
- The BRUSA Agreement was signed between the governments of Britain and the United States to exchange personnel and wartime intelligence between the cryptanalysis agencies of the two nations, along with those of Canada and Australia.
- The ten surviving RAF bombers out of 19 from the "Dam Busters" returned, though only six would survive to the end of the war.
- The German submarine U-646 (with all of its 46 crew) was sunk by the RAF No. 269 Squadron and U-657 (with all of its crew of at least 44) was depth charged and sunk by the Royal Navy frigate HMS Swale.
- Born: Tuanku Syed Sirajuddin, King of Malaysia from 2001 to 2006, and Raja of Perlis since 2000; in Arau
- Died: Montagu Love, 66, British illustrator and character actor on film

== May 18, 1943 (Tuesday) ==
- With an Allied invasion of Italy imminent, Pope Pius XII sent an appeal to U.S. President Roosevelt, asking that American bombers spare the destruction of Rome, noting that its "many treasured shrines of religion and art" were "the precious heritage not of one people but of all human and Christian civilization".
- Having captured Tunisia, the Allies began the bombing of the Italian island of Pantelleria, 100 miles from Tunis. Pantelleria would be invaded without opposition on June 11, and would serve as a base for attacks on the larger Italian island of Sicily, 60 miles away.
- The Hot Springs Conference, which would create the basis for the Food and Agriculture Organization, opened in the United States in Hot Springs, Virginia.
- The Memphis Belle's crew became the first aircrew in the 8th Air Force to complete its 25-mission tour of duty. The aircraft and crew, first to survive their tour, returned to the United States to assist in publicity for the sale of War Bonds.
- Born: Jimmy Snuka (ring name for James William Reiher), Fijian-born American professional wrestler; in Suva (d. 2017)

== May 19, 1943 (Wednesday) ==
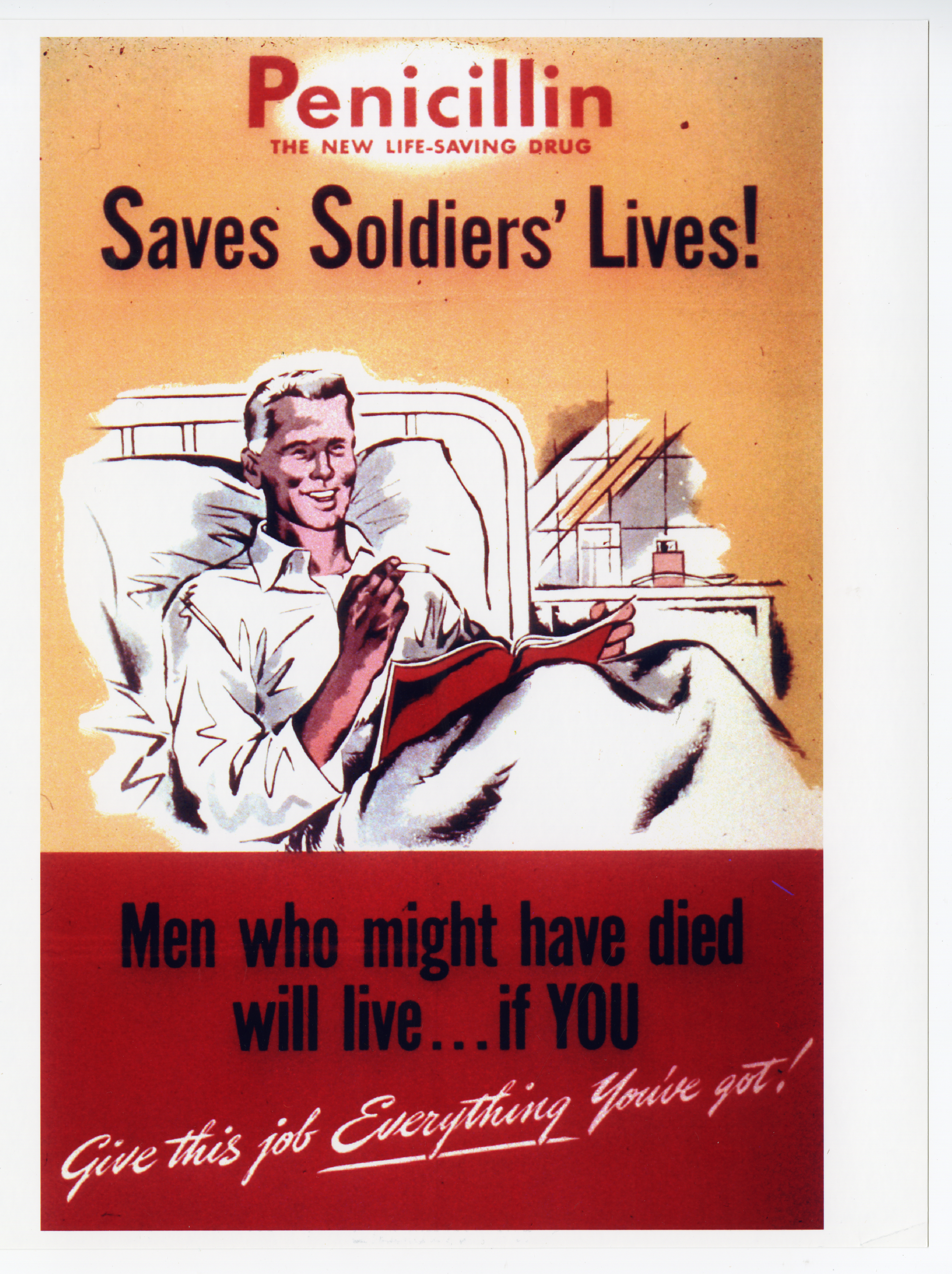
Workplace poster for Penicillin, the New Lief-Saving Drug

- Following years of experimentation to test the safety of the first antibiotic drug, the United States Army Medical Corps cleared the release of penicillin for use in all military hospitals. Two days later, the first patient to receive the drug would be an unidentified U.S. Army soldier. Although the bacteria-killing properties of the mold Penicillium chrysogenum had been discovered by Alexander Fleming 15 years earlier, production was limited until 1942, when a potent strain of the mold was discovered on a cantaloupe that had been discarded from a market in Peoria, Illinois, where research was being performed on synthesizing the drug. The "Peoria strain" was found by microbiologist Dorothy I. Fennell to yield 50 times as much penicillin as previously tested strains, making mass production possible. Mary Hunt, a technician of the lab, is usually given credit for discovering the cantaloupe that contained the mold although the laboratory's supervisor, Kenneth B. Raper, would tell a reporter in 1976 that "A housewife in town knew we were looking for moldy food, and she brought in the moldy cantaloupe," and handed it over to a guard, then departed without ever leaving her name.

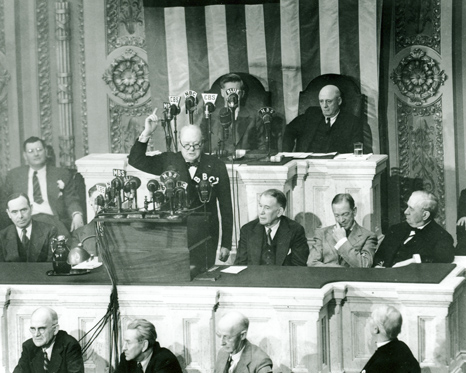
Prime Minister Churchill at the U.S. Capitol

- Winston Churchill addressed a joint session of the United States Congress (as well as a national radio audience), reviewing the course of the war and reassuring his audience of Britain's dedication to its alliance with the United States. Churchill noted that "We will wage war at your side against Japan while there is breath in our bodies and while blood flows in our veins."
- German Propaganda Minister Joseph Goebbels declared that, after 60 days of work, Berlin was now Judenfrei—free of Jews.
- A mistaken attack by the British submarine HMS Sportsman killed 137 people on the French passenger ship SS General Bonaparte. The civilian ship, sailing with 199 passengers and 68 crew from Ajaccio (on Corsica) to Nice in the Nazi-occupied Vichy France, was torpedoed and sunk by the British submarine HMS Sportsman after being mistaken for an enemy troop transport.
- The German submarine U-273 was depth charged and sunk in the Atlantic Ocean by a Lockheed Hudson of No. 269 Squadron RAF with the loss of all its crew of at least 44.
- The German submarine U-954 was sunk along with all 47 crew southeast of Cape Farewell, Greenland by British warships. Among the crew who perished in the sinking was the son of Admiral Karl Dönitz, Peter Dönitz.
- Born: Helena Quinn, Australian-born American theoretical physicist; in Melbourne
- Died: Kristjan Raud, 77, Estonian painter

== May 20, 1943 (Thursday) ==
- The United States Court for China, a federal civil and criminal court that had been based in Shanghai since 1906, ceased operations upon the ratification by the U.S. of a treaty with China, signed on January 11, relinquishing extraterritoriality privileges.
- Joseph E. Davies, the former American ambassador to the Soviet Union, met secretly with Soviet Premier Stalin to deliver a letter from U.S. President Roosevelt, proposing "an informal and completely simple visit for a few days between you and me" during the summer, "either on your side or my side of the Bering Straits". The invitation was kept secret even from British Prime Minister Churchill.
- The German submarine U-258 was depth charged and sunk in the Atlantic Ocean by a B-24 of No. 120 Squadron RAF.
- The National Advisory Committee for Aeronautics' Aircraft Engine Research Laboratory (now the Glenn Research Center) held its dedication ceremony in Cleveland, Ohio.
- Died: John Stone Stone, 73, American physicist and inventor with 120 U.S. patents for radio, telephone and wireless telegraph technology, known for his invention of four-circuit tuning

== May 21, 1943 (Friday) ==
- The government of Bulgaria, under pressure from its Axis partner, Germany, agreed to surrender the 25,000 Jewish residents of Sofia for deportation to concentration camps. Within three days, massive protests were organized and the plan was foiled. The city's Jews were resettled in labor camps within Bulgaria, with the men to be used for public works, but no further attempts at extermination were made.
- Tokyo Radio announced the April 18 death of the commander of Japan's Navy, Admiral Isoroku Yamamoto, who had been killed when his plane was shot down over the Solomon Islands by an American fighter plane. The announcer, whose voice broke, said that Yamamoto "engaged in combat with the enemy and met a gallant death in a warplane", giving the first reports of the military leader's death, which had not been announced in the United States. President Roosevelt, who had ordered Operation Vengeance, was asked by reporters for a comment, and his sarcastic official statement was "Gosh!".
- The German submarine U-303 was torpedoed and sunk in the Mediterranean off Toulon by the British submarine Sickle with the loss of 19 of her 47 crew.

== May 22, 1943 (Saturday) ==
- The Comintern was dissolved in Moscow. The Communist International, which had been founded with the goal of "formenting of world revolution", had been voted out of existence by its executive committee on May 15 and an announcement was made in Pravda. In that the Soviet Union had joined the Allies after the invasion of the USSR by Germany in 1941, the declaration was believed by Western observers to be a signal by Joseph Stalin that the Soviet Union intended to stop its policy of trying to foment revolution in the other nations until after World War II.
- The German submarine U-569 was scuttled by its crew in the Atlantic Ocean after being depth charged and damaged by two Grumman TBM Avenger aircraft from the escort carrier USS Bogue. While 22 of its crew died after jumping overboard, the British ship St. Laurent rescued the commander and 24 of his crew for interrogation.
- Born:
  - Betty Williams, Northern Irish political activist, and 1976 Nobel Peace Prize laureate for her founding of Community of Peace People; in Belfast (d. 2020)
  - Tommy John, American MLB baseball player known for playing 26 seasons from 1963 to 1989; in Terre Haute, Indiana
- Died: Helen Taft, 81, First Lady of the United States from 1909 to 1913 as the wife of U.S. President William Howard Taft

== May 23, 1943 (Sunday) ==
- The heaviest air raid in history, up to that time, began as the Royal Air Force dropped 2,000 tons of bombs on Dortmund, topping the record of 1,500 tons dropped on Duisburg on May 12.
- The Italian submarine Leonardo da Vinci was depth charged and sunk west of Portugal by two British warships. The da Vinci had sunk 17 ships, including the ocean liner RMS Empress of Canada on March 14. All 62 crew of the Leonardo da Vinci died in its sinking.
- The German submarine U-752 was sunk in the Atlantic Ocean in the first successful use of the new Rocket Spear anti-submarine weapon. The Rocket Spear, fired from one of the Fairey Swordfish aircraft of 819 Squadron, Fleet Air Arm from the British escort carrier Archer punched a hole through the pressure hull of U-572, killing 30 of the 47 crew. The 17 survivors scuttled the boat.

== May 24, 1943 (Monday) ==
- After Allied forces in the North Atlantic sank 22 of the 60 German U-boats in the first two weeks of May, Grand Admiral Karl Dönitz ordered the remaining submarines to halt their attacks on Allied convoys, and to make "a temporary shift of operation to areas less endangered by aircraft". Because of an improvement in Allied radar and in air patrols, "Black May" would see the sinking of 41 of the German subs in a single month.
- Born: Gary Burghoff, American comedian, TV, stage and film actor best known for portraying "Radar" O'Reilly on the M*A*S*H film and series, as well as the title character in the musical You're a Good Man, Charlie Brown; in Bristol, Connecticut
- Died: Parker Corning, 69, seven-term U.S. Congressman and businessman who "once a millionaire many times over, died essentially broke"

== May 25, 1943 (Tuesday) ==
- At the Auschwitz concentration camp in occupied Poland, a group of 1,035 Gypsies (507 men and 528 women) were killed in a single day. SS personnel, armed with lists of the persons to be exterminated, went around to each of the barracks, and took the condemned to the gas chambers.
- The German submarine U-414 was depth charged and sunk with the loss of all 47 crew, northwest of Ténès, Algeria by corvette HMS Vetch, and the U-467 was depth charged and sunk in the North Atlantic by an American PBY Catalina.
- Born:
  - Jessi Colter, American singer and composer, in Phoenix, Arizona
  - Leslie Uggams, American singer and actress, in New York City

== May 26, 1943 (Wednesday) ==
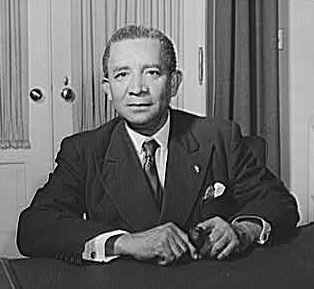
President Barclay

- Edwin Barclay, the President of Liberia, was welcomed by U.S. President Roosevelt to the White House, along with President-elect William Tubman. That evening, the African leader "became the first member of his race to spend the night as a guest at the Executive Mansion". In the next 45 years, Ethiopian Emperor Haile Selassie I (in 1954 and 1963), Haitian President Paul Magloire (1955), and entertainer Sammy Davis, Jr. (1973), along with their families, would be the only other black dignitaries to spend the night at the White House.
- U.S. President Roosevelt ordered striking workers at three rubber companies in Akron, Ohio, to return to work. In a telegram to union leaders, Roosevelt said that unless production resumed at noon the next day, "your government will take the necessary steps to protect the interests of the nation". Nearly all of the employees at Goodyear Tire, Firestone Tire and General Tire reported for work the next day, although only a few at B.F. Goodrich complied.
- The German submarine U-436 was depth charged and sunk with the loss of all 47 crew west of Cape Ortegal by two British warships.Helgason, Guðmundur. "The Type VIIC boat U-436". German U-boats of WWII – uboat.net.
- Died: Edsel Ford, 49, American businessman and philanthropist who had served as president of Ford Motor Company since 1919, died from stomach cancer.

== May 27, 1943 (Thursday) ==
- The U.S. Office of War Mobilization was established by President Roosevelt under Executive Order No. 9347. James F. Byrnes would be named as the first Director.
- The Fair Employment Practices Commission (FEPC) was given additional powers to punish discrimination, under Executive Order No. 9346.
- The U.S. War Production Board issued an order that all contractors engaged in war production were barred from practicing racial discrimination.
- "Nazi cultural functionaries" in German-occupied Paris removed the paintings of disapproved artists from the Galerie nationale du Jeu de Paume, and burned them in the museum's courtyard. Destroyed were works by André Masson, Joan Miró, Francis Picabia, Max Ernst, Fernand Léger and Pablo Picasso.
- At the Polish city of Tluste, now part of Ukraine, liquidation of the Jewish population was carried out by the German SS, with 3,000 persons killed in a single day. The people were forcibly assembled gathered in the town square, then led in groups of at least 100 to the town's Jewish cemetery, where they were shot.
- Upon the conclusion of the Washington Conference, Winston Churchill flew to Algiers with General George Marshall to discuss military strategy with Eisenhower.

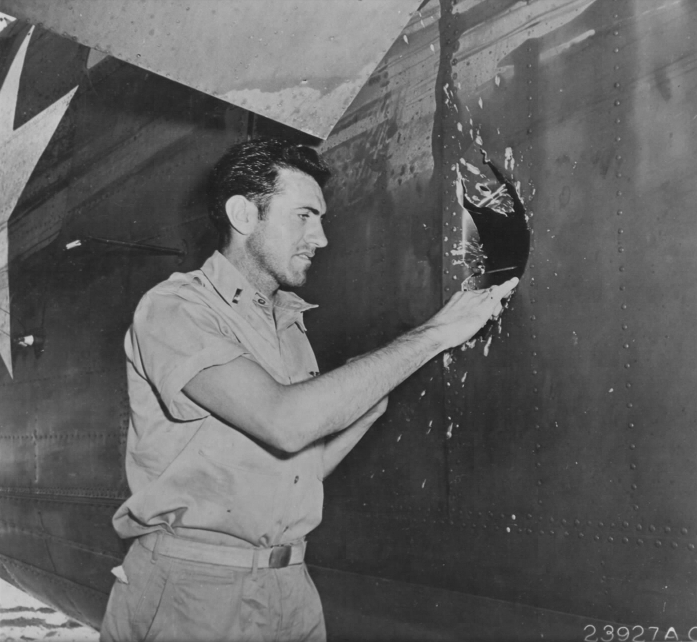
Former Olympic athlete and army officer Louis Zamperini

- The Green Hornet, a B-24 Liberator carrying 11 crew, including former Olympic distance runner and army officer Louis Zamperini, malfunctioned and crashed into the Pacific Ocean south off the island of Palmyra during a search-and-rescue mission for a downed pilot.
- Born:
  - Bruce Weitz, American TV actor (Hill Street Blues), in Norwalk, Connecticut
  - Cilla Black (stage name for Priscilla White), British singer and television presenter; in Liverpool (d. 2015)
- Died: Arthur Mee, 67, British educator and children's author who created The Children's Encyclopædia in 1908, which was published in the United States as The Book of Knowledge

== May 28, 1943 (Friday) ==
- After the Japanese forces on Attu Island had been reduced from 2,500 to 1,000 in the fight with the United States, the remaining group decided to launch suicide attacks on the American forces.
- The German submarine U-304 was depth charged and sunk with the loss of all 46 crew, southeast of Cape Farewell, Greenland by a B-24 of No. 120 Squadron RAF, and the U-755 was attacked with rockets and sunk north of Mallorca by a Lockheed Hudson of No. 608 Squadron RAF with the loss of 31 of its 40 crew.
- Aaron Copland's ballet Rodeo was performed for the first time, with symphonic accompaniment by Arthur Fiedler and the Boston Pops.
- Born: Sine Larsen, Danish chemist and crystallographer (d. 2025)

== May 29, 1943 (Saturday) ==
- RAF Bomber Command sent 719 aircraft to bomb Wuppertal overnight. The raid created a firestorm that killed over 3,500 people.
- Norman Rockwell's illustration of Rosie the Riveter was introduced, on the cover of the Memorial Day issue of the Saturday Evening Post. Rockwell's inspiration was a 1942 song written by Redd Evans and John Jacob Loeb, and recorded by Kay Kyser, and the model for the painting was a 19-year-old telephone operator from Arlington, Vermont, Mary Doyle.
- "That Old Black Magic" by Glenn Miller and His Orchestra hit #1 on the Billboard singles chart.
- Died: Muhamed Mehmedbašić, 56, Bosnian revolutionary and conspirator in the 1914 assassination of Archduke Franz Ferdinand of Austria, was killed by the Ustashe, the secret police of the Nazi-sponsored Independent State of Croatia

== May 30, 1943 (Sunday) ==
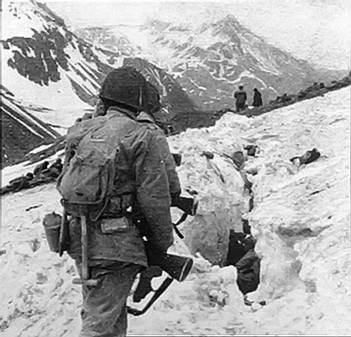
U.S. troops retake Alaska's Attu island

- After 19 days of fighting, the United States recaptured Alaska's Attu Island from the Japanese Army, annihilating the remaining fighters "except for a few snipers". The Japanese soldiers who were not killed in battle committed mass suicide, and a search of the island found no survivors. Of the 2,500 Japanese who originally tried to hold the Alaskan island, only 28 prisoners were alive at the battle's end, while the American losses were 600 dead.
- Dr. Josef Mengele began his service as a medical officer in the Auschwitz-Birkenau concentration camp, and spent the next 19 months conducting bizarre surgical experiments on the captive patients.
- In a German air raid on the British coastal town of Torquay, a church was bombed, killing 35 children and four Sunday school teachers.
- The British submarine HMS Untamed sank during a training exercise in the Firth of Clyde with the loss of all 35 of her crew. She was later raised, repaired and returned to service as HMS Vitality.

The AAGPBL patch worn by the players

- The four team All-American Girls Professional Baseball League (AAGPBL), the first and last professional baseball league with women players, made its debut, with the South Bend Blue Sox (Indiana) beating the Rockford Peaches (Illinois), 1–0. In the game with the two Wisconsin teams Kenosha Shamrocks beat the Racine Belles, 8–6.
- Born:
  - James Chaney, African-American civil rights worker, in Meridian, Mississippi (killed 1964)
  - Gale Sayers, African-American NFL running back and Hall of Famer, in Wichita, Kansas (died 2020)

== May 31, 1943 (Monday) ==
- The "Zoot Suit Riots" erupted between military personnel and Mexican American youths in East Los Angeles.
- The German submarine U-440 was sunk with all 46 crew west of Cape Ortegal by a Short Sunderland aircraft of No. 201 Squadron RAF, and the U-563 was depth charged and sunk with all 49 crew in the Bay of Biscay by British and Australian aircraft.
- Born:
  - Joe Namath, American NFL quarterback and Hall of Famer, in Beaver Falls, Pennsylvania
  - Sharon Gless, American TV actress known for Cagney & Lacey;, in Los Angeles
