= April 1943 =

Month of 1943

<<	April 1943					>>
Su	Mo	Tu	We	Th	Fr	Sa
				1	2	3
4	5	6	7	8	9	10
11	12	13	14	15	16	17
18	19	20	21	22	23	24
25	26	27	28	29	30

The following events occurred in April 1943:

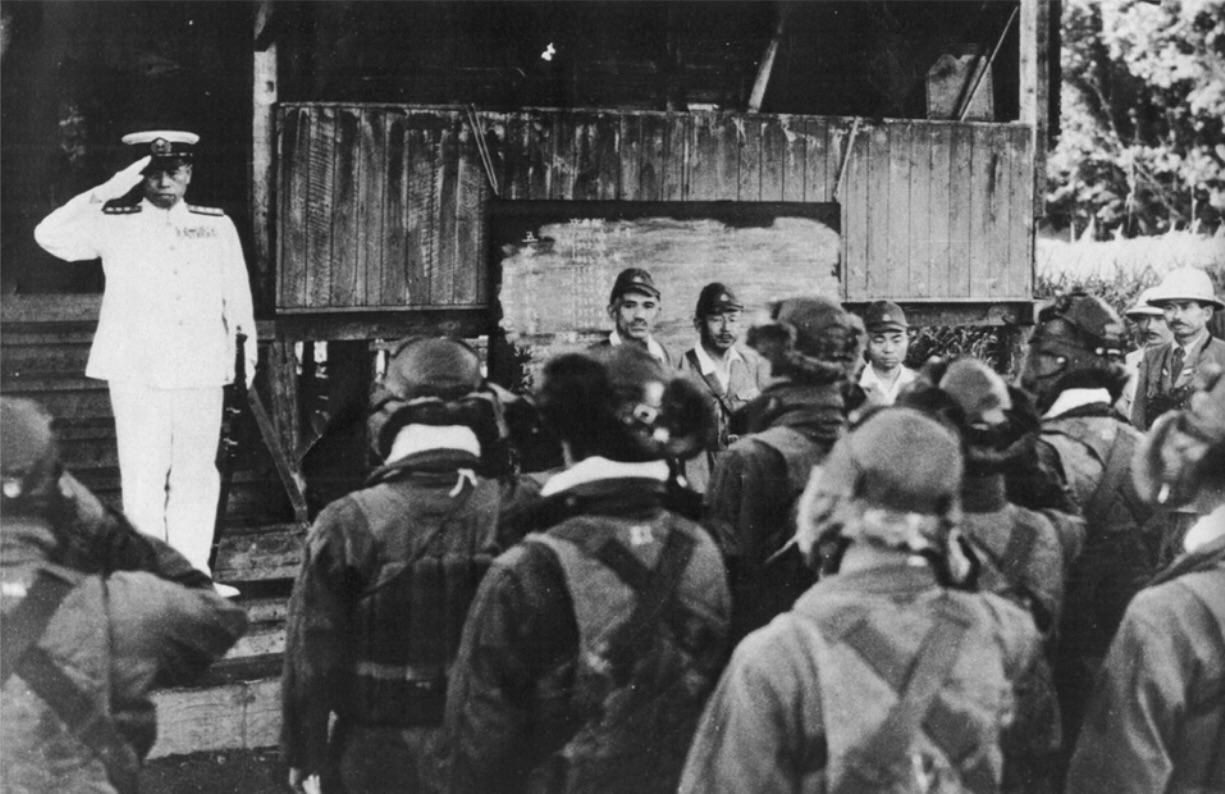
April 18, 1943: Japan's Admiral Yamamoto killed when Americans discover and shoot down his airplane

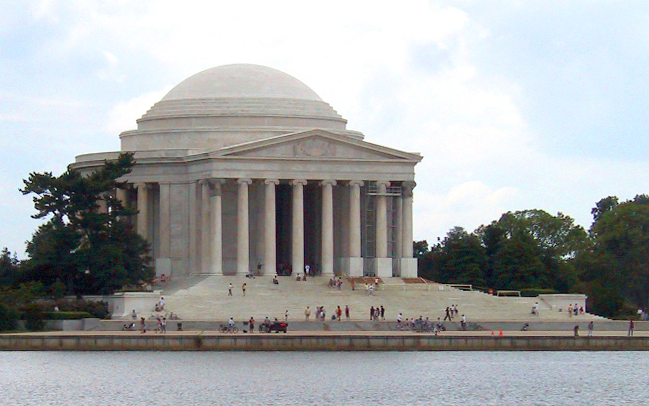
April 20, 1943: Jefferson Memorial dedicated on Jefferson's 200th birthday

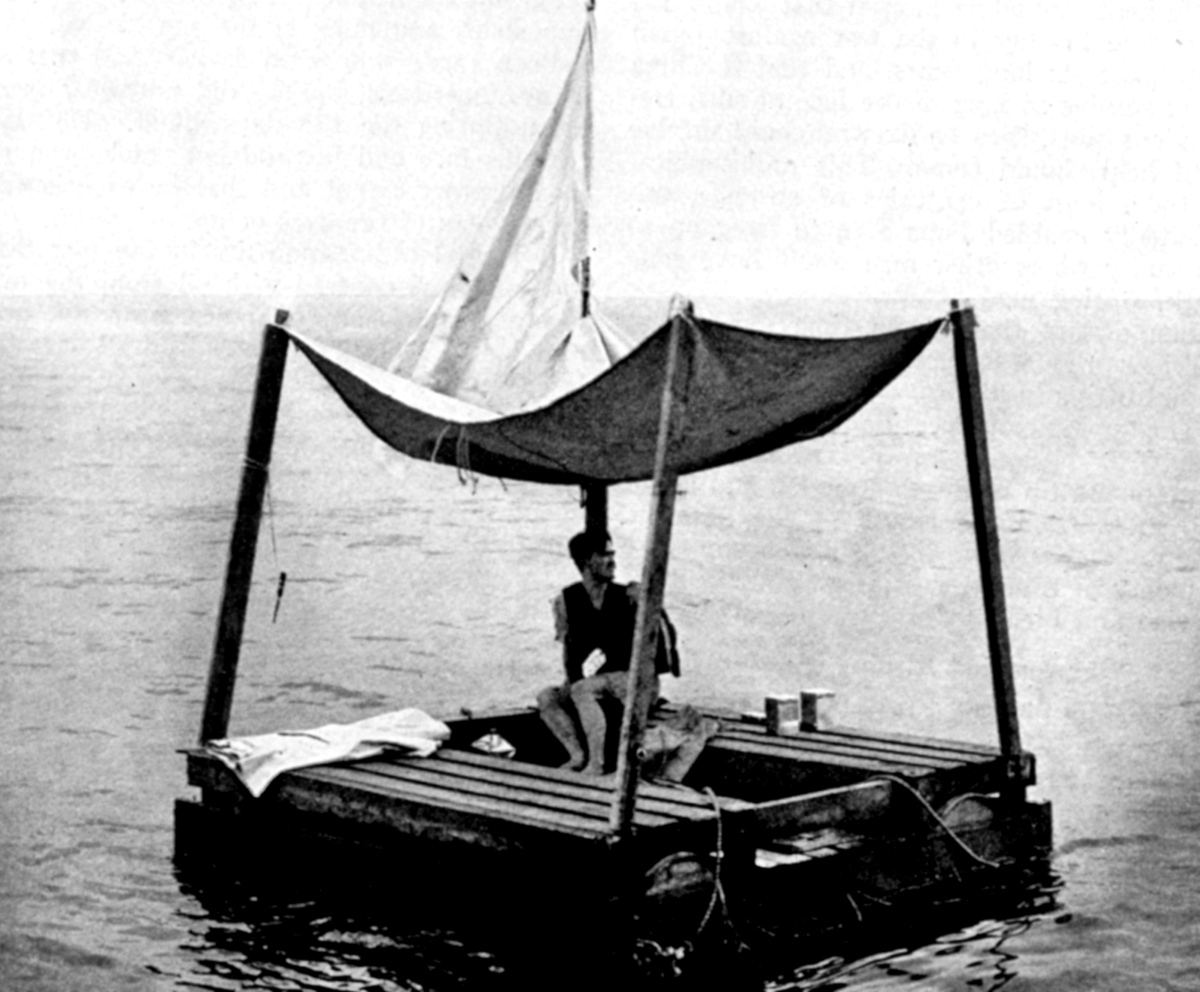
April 3, 1943: Shipwreck survivor Poon Lim rescued after 131 days adrift

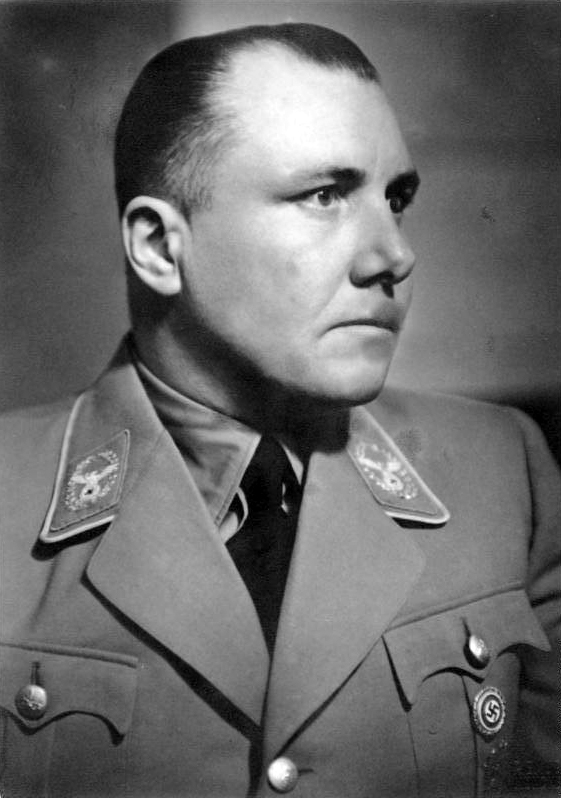
April 12, 1943: Martin Bormann designated as Hitler's second-in-command

== April 1, 1943 (Thursday) ==
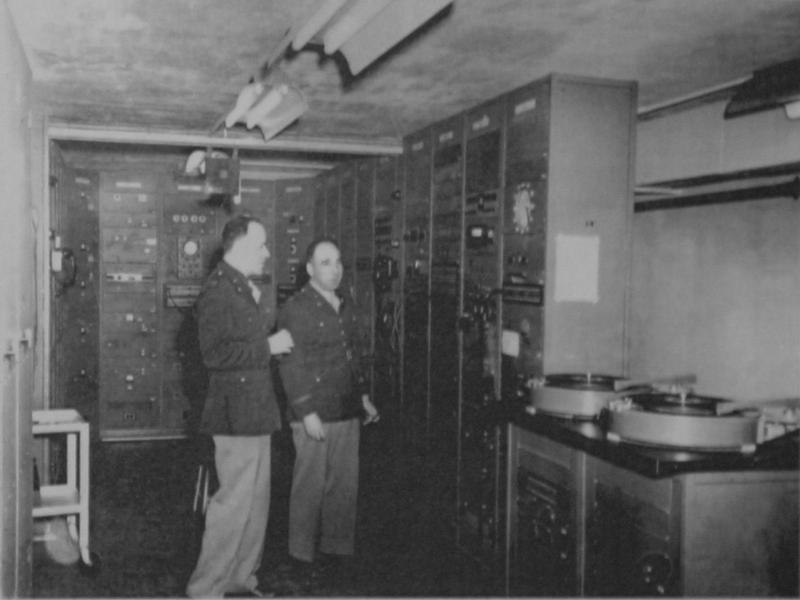
Britain's SIGSALY terminal

- SIGSALY, referred to as the X System vocoder or "Green Hornet", went into operation for use in secure phone conversations between U.S. President Franklin D. Roosevelt and U.K. Prime Minister Winston Churchill. The new system, developed by AT&T's Bell Labs, encrypted speech into electronic signals that could be transmitted at the rate of 1,551 bits per second, and decrypted it at the other end, permitting the two wartime leaders to talk to each other without being understood by wiretappers. The terminals for transatlantic calls were at The Pentagon in Washington, D.C. and in the basement of Selfridges department store in London.
- In the Second Battle of Sedjenane, Allied forces retook the Tunisian town of Sedjenane on the railway line to Mateur and the port of Bizerta. The remainder of the strategic locations in and around Sedjeane were retaken by the Allies by April 12.
- Japanese forces launched Operation I-Go, a 15-day aerial counter-offensive in the Pacific around the Solomon Islands, New Britain and New Guinea, in an effort to halt the Allied offensive following Japan's defeat in the Guadalcanal campaign. The operation did not significantly delay the Allied offensive and Admiral Isoroku Yamamoto's estimates of the damage done were overestimated.
- The Royal Air Force marked its 25th anniversary by presenting Churchill with honorary wings. "I am honoured to be accorded a place, albeit out of kindness, in that comradeship of the air which guards the life of our island and carries doom to tyrants, whether they flaunt themselves or burrow deep," Churchill stated.
- The Italian destroyer Lubiana was either sunk or stranded off the Tunisian coast and declared a total constructive loss.

== April 2, 1943 (Friday) ==
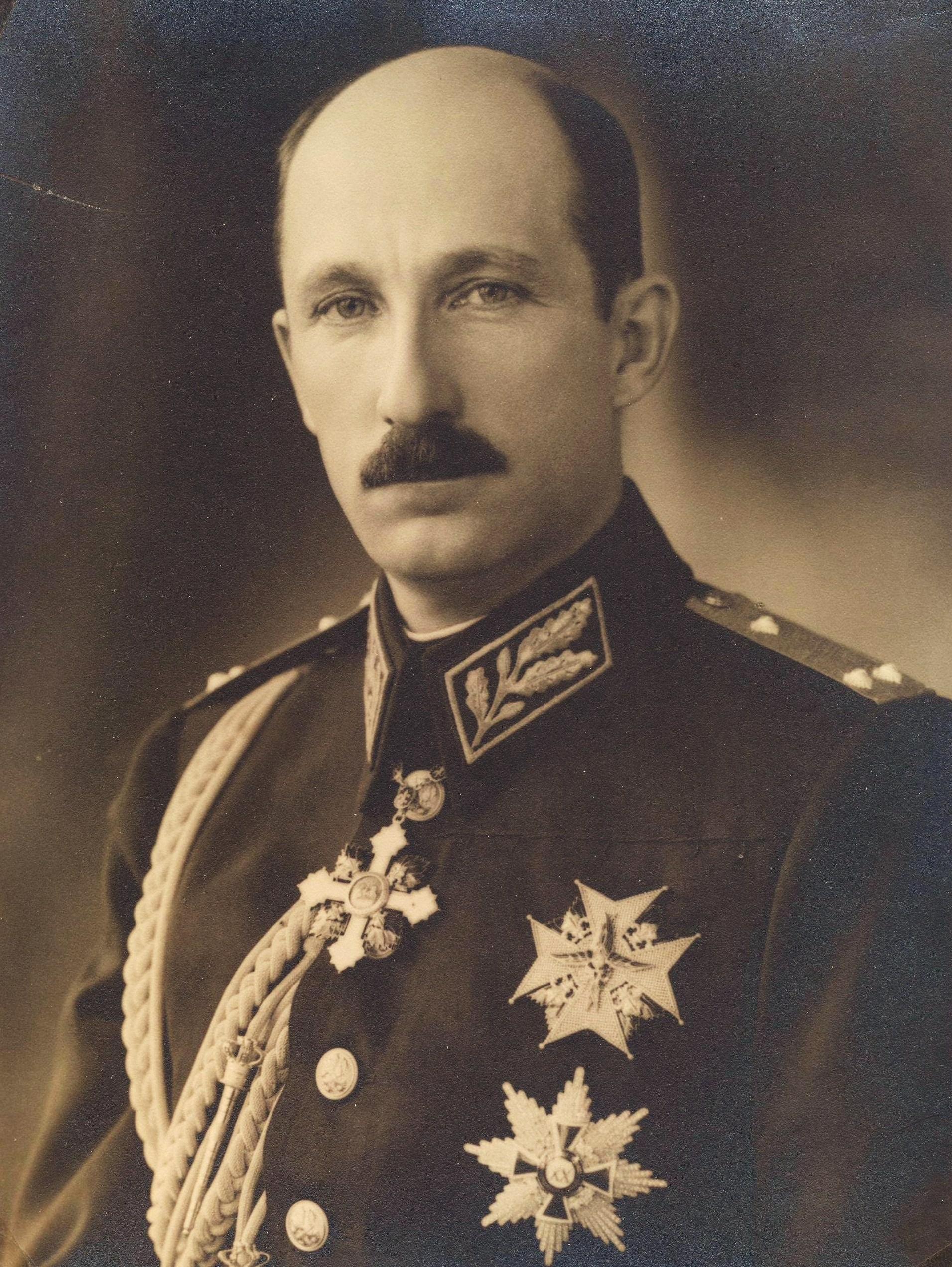
King Boris III

- On a visit to Germany, King Boris III of Bulgaria told German Foreign Minister Joachim von Ribbentrop that the 25,000 Jews in Bulgaria would not be turned over to German control, despite the alliance between the two Axis powers. At most, the King said, the Bulgarian government might intern its Jewish citizens in camps under Bulgarian control.
- The German submarine U-124 was shelled and sunk in the Atlantic Ocean west of Porto, Portugal by British warships, with the loss of all 48 crew.
- Born: Larry Coryell, American jazz fusion guitarist; in Galveston, Texas (d. 2017)

== April 3, 1943 (Saturday) ==
- The Battle of Manners Street, a riot in Wellington, New Zealand, between American servicemen and New Zealand servicemen and civilians, occurred when some of the American servicemen refused to allow Māori soldiers to enter the Allied Services Club. Dozens of people were injured but news of the riot was censored at the time.
- Shipwrecked steward Poon Lim was rescued by Brazilian fishermen after being adrift for 131 days as the sole survivor of a British merchant ship, the SS Benlomond, which had been torpedoed on November 29, 1942.
- Born:
  - Richard Manuel, Canadian-born pop musician for The Band; in Stratford, Ontario (d. 1986)
  - Trond Mohn, Scottish-born Norwegian billionaire; in Buckie

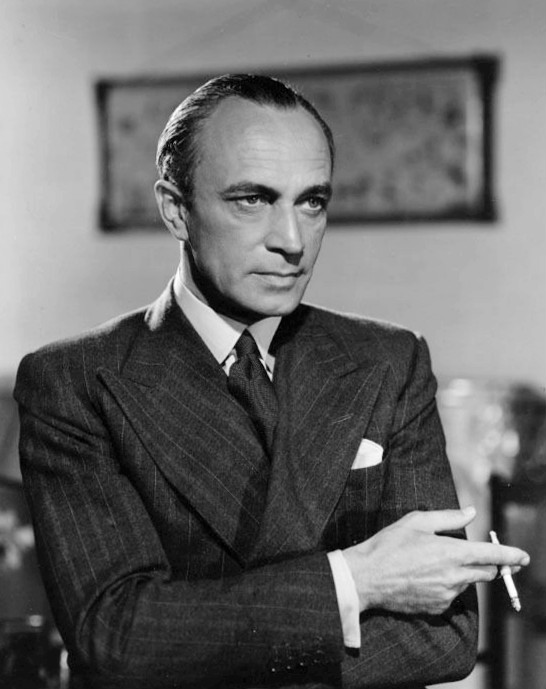
Veidt

- Died: Conrad Veidt, 50, German-born film actor known for Casablanca, died of a heart attack while playing golf at the Riviera Country Club in Los Angeles with singer Arthur Fields and his personal physician.

== April 4, 1943 (Sunday) ==
- Lady Be Good, an American B-24 bomber became lost over the North African desert after completing a bombing raid in Italy, ran out of gas, and crashed after its crew parachuted to safety. The nine member crew died of thirst, one by one, over the next eight days. For nearly 16 years, Lady Be Good would remain missing until its discovery on February 27, 1959. The bodies of the men would be found almost a year after that, on February 11, 1960.
- William Dyess was able to escape from a Japanese prisoner of war camp in the Philippines along with nine other men, and to make his way through the jungle and to a ship that transported him to Australia. Once free, Dyess would be able to reveal to the world the atrocities of the Bataan Death March that had taken place after U.S. and Philippine forces surrendered on April 9, 1942.
- An American B-25 bomber on a training mission went down in Lake Murray in South Carolina. The entire crew was rescued by a boater on the lake, but the B-25 sank to the bottom of the lake for the next 62 years, finally being raised on September 19, 2005 in nearly perfect condition.
- German radio announced that three former imprisoned leaders had been turned over by the government of Vichy France, to Germany, in order to stop "establishment of a counter-government". Former Prime Ministers Édouard Daladier and Léon Blum, along with the former French Army commander in chief, General Maurice Gamelin, had been held in custody in France since shortly after the 1940 surrender, and would be sent to Buchenwald concentration camp until the end of the war.
- Born: Mike Epstein, American MLB baseball player nicknamed "SuperJew"; in the Bronx
- Died: Raoul Laparra, 67, French composer of the opera La Habanera, was killed in an American air raid on Paris.

== April 5, 1943 (Monday) ==
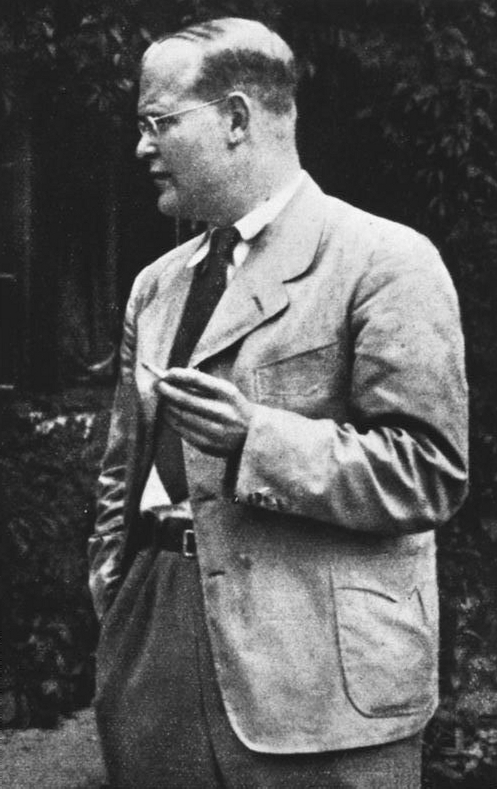
Pastor Bonhoeffer

- Lutheran pastor Dietrich Bonhoeffer was arrested at the headquarters of the German military intelligence (the Abwehr) by the Nazi secret police (the Gestapo) along with lawyer Hans von Dohnanyi, and both were found to have incriminating materials in their possession, showing cooperation with the enemy in Britain. Adolf Hitler would order the execution of Bonhoeffer, Dohnanyi, and the Abwehr director, Admiral Wilhelm Canaris, on April 9, 1945, less than a month before the conquest of Germany.
- The German submarine U-635 was sunk in the North Atlantic by a B-24 of No. 120 Squadron RAF, with the loss of its entire crew of at least 44 men.
- The Japanese submarine Ro-34 was sunk off the Russell Islands by American destroyers O'Bannon and Strong, with all 66 of its crew.
- American bomber planes bombed the town of Mortsel in Belgium. The target was a local factory in which German fighter planes were being repaired. However, only four out of 216 bombs that were dropped hit the target, while the others destroyed most of the town of Mortsel, killing 936 civilians.
- Born: Max Gail, American television actor who portrayed Wojo Wojciehowicz, on Barney Miller; in Detroit

== April 6, 1943 (Tuesday) ==
- The Little Prince, a children's book by Antoine de Saint-Exupéry, was published. Saint-Exupéry would join the French Army later in the month, and would disappear the next year after his airplane was shot down in combat.
- Five members of the U.S. Army Air Forces were rescued after having been marooned on an icecap in Greenland for almost five months. The men had been on a B-17 bomber that made a crash landing while searching for another lost plane, but were kept alive with supplies dropped by Colonel Bernt Balchen, an Arctic explorer and aviator.
- The German submarine U-632 was sunk in the Atlantic Ocean by a B-24 of No. 86 Squadron RAF, along with all 48 of her crew.

== April 7, 1943 (Wednesday) ==
- Adolf Hitler and Benito Mussolini began a four-day meeting at Schloss Klessheim near Salzburg. Mussolini was in poor health and would spend most of the conference listening silently to Hitler's long rambling monologues; an attempt by Mussolini to bring up the possibility of making peace with the Soviets was swiftly rebuffed.
- The British government published a plan drawn up by John Maynard Keynes for a postwar economy. The plan proposed an international monetary fund which could help any nation out of temporary financial difficulties. In return, that country would have to adopt policies aimed at restoring stability.
- The Battle of Wadi Akarit ended in an Allied victory, with the capture of 7,000 German and Italian prisoners, and 1,289 casualties. American forces of 2nd Corps under General George Patton reached the El Guettar–Gabès road, where they linked up with the lead elements of the British 8th Army. With the Mareth Line broken in the south of Tunisia, the remaining Axis forces made a retreat to join the other Axis forces in the north.
- The American destroyer Aaron Ward was bombed and sunk in Ironbottom Sound by Japanese aircraft. Of its complement of 208 crew, 181 were rescued by the U.S. ships Ortolan and Vireo, while 27 were dead or missing. The wreckage of Aaron Ward would be discovered more than 50 years later, on September 5, 1994, at a depth of 230 feet (70 m).
- The German submarine U-644 was torpedoed and sunk, with the loss of all 45 crew, in the Norwegian Sea by the British submarine Tuna.
- Bolivia declared war against the Axis powers, becoming the 33rd nation to enter World War II on the side of the Allies. Although Bolivia supplied tin to the Allies, the South American nation did not send troops overseas and had no reported casualties.
- Died: Alexandre Millerand, 84, President of France from 1920 to 1924 and Prime Minister in 1920

== April 8, 1943 (Thursday) ==
- The Japanese decided to answer their logistic needs by building a new railway in northern Burma using forced labour.
- The Detroit Red Wings defeated the Boston Bruins 2–0 to sweep the 1943 Stanley Cup Finals in four games.
- The 1943 NFL draft was held in Chicago. The Detroit Lions selected running back Frank Sinkwich of the University of Georgia as the #1 overall pick.
- Born: Michael Bennett, American choreographer and director known for A Chorus Line, and winner of seven Tony Awards; as Michael Bennett DiFiglia in Buffalo, New York (died of AIDS in 1987)
- Died:
  - Harry Baur, 62, French character actor, was killed after being tortured by the Gestapo in Berlin.
  - Otto Hempel, 45 and Elise Hampel, 39, German opponents of the Nazi regime, were executed in Berlin.
  - Richard Sears, 81, seven-time U.S. tennis champion, 1881–1887

== April 9, 1943 (Friday) ==
- Liquidation of the Jews in the Zborow ghetto in German-occupied Ukraine began, with the shooting of about 2,300 people on the first day.
- The Japanese destroyer Isonami was torpedoed and sunk Penang Maru by the American submarine USS Tautog off the coast of Indonesia, near Wangiwangi Island in the Banda Sea, while rescuing survivors of a sinking freighter. All but seven of the 219 crew of Isonami were rescued.
- The war film Edge of Darkness starring Errol Flynn and Ann Sheridan was released.
- Died: Philip Slier, 19, a Jewish Dutch typesetter whose letters about life in a Nazi forced labor camp would be discovered in 1997, was killed in the Sobibór extermination camp.

== April 10, 1943 (Saturday) ==
- Former American college football star Tom Harmon, who had joined the U.S. Army Air Corps, disappeared while flying over Surinam. The only member of his crew to survive a crash in bad weather, Harmon survived for seven days by drinking swamp water and eating rations, Harmon was able to make his way to Paramaribo and was able to rejoin his unit.
- The Tunisian port of Sfax was captured from the Axis powers by the British Army, led by General Bernard Montgomery in the course of the North African Campaign. Sfax would then become the base for the Allied invasion of Sicily as the first stage of the Italian Campaign.
- The Italian cruiser Trieste sank in shallow water at the port at La Maddalena, Sardinia, after being hit by several bombs from American B-24s. Of the 781 crew, 66 men were killed or missing.
- Born: Margaret Pemberton, British romance and mystery author; as Margaret Hudson in Bradford

== April 11, 1943 (Sunday) ==
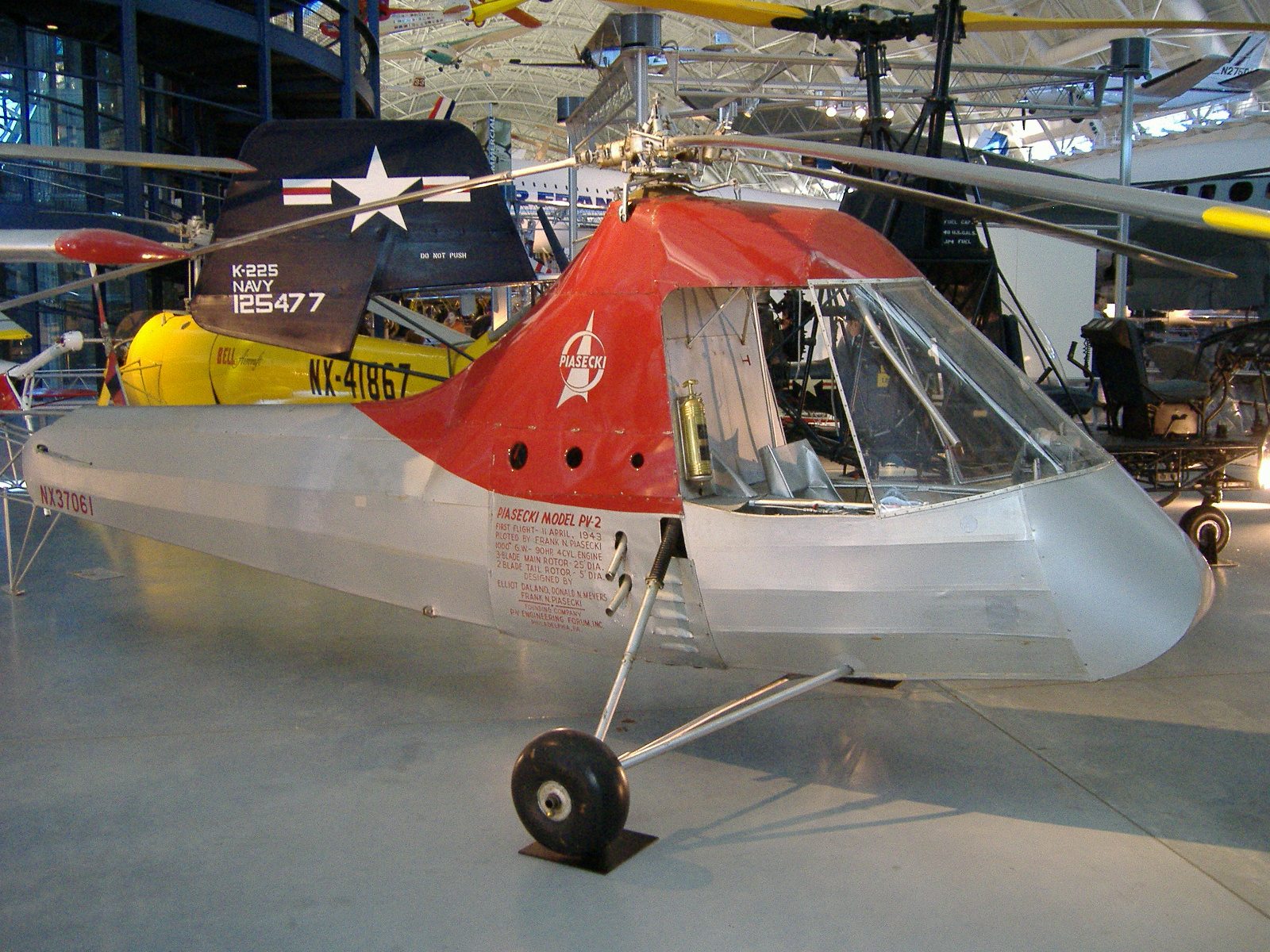
The Piasecki PV-2

- Frank Piasecki made the first flight of his own Piasecki PV-2, only the second successful American helicopter. The PV-2 "featured the first dynamically balanced rotor blades", differing it from the Vought-Sikorsky VS-300, which had made its first free flight on May 13, 1940.
- The British destroyer Beverley was torpedoed and sunk in the Atlantic Ocean by German submarine U-188, with the loss of all 139 members of her crew.
- Born: Harley Race, American pro wrestling star; in Quitman, Missouri (d. 2019)
- Died:
  - Rufus Leonoir Patterson Jr., 70, inventor and developer of tobacco manufacturing machinery
  - James Hatsuaki Wakasa, 63, former chef from San Francisco and an internee at the Topaz War Relocation Center near Topaz, Utah. Wakasa, a Japanese-born American citizen, had been relocated to Utah as part of the Japanese American internment. He was shot and killed by a military policeman, Private Gerald B. Philpott, after venturing too close to the fence surrounding the camp. Philpott would be acquitted of any wrongdoing at a court-martial.

== April 12, 1943 (Monday) ==
- Martin Bormann was appointed as Secretary to the Führer, the second highest office in Nazi Germany.
- The British War Office made its first report on the intelligence gathered concerning Germany's missile program, with the title "German Long-Range Rocket Development".

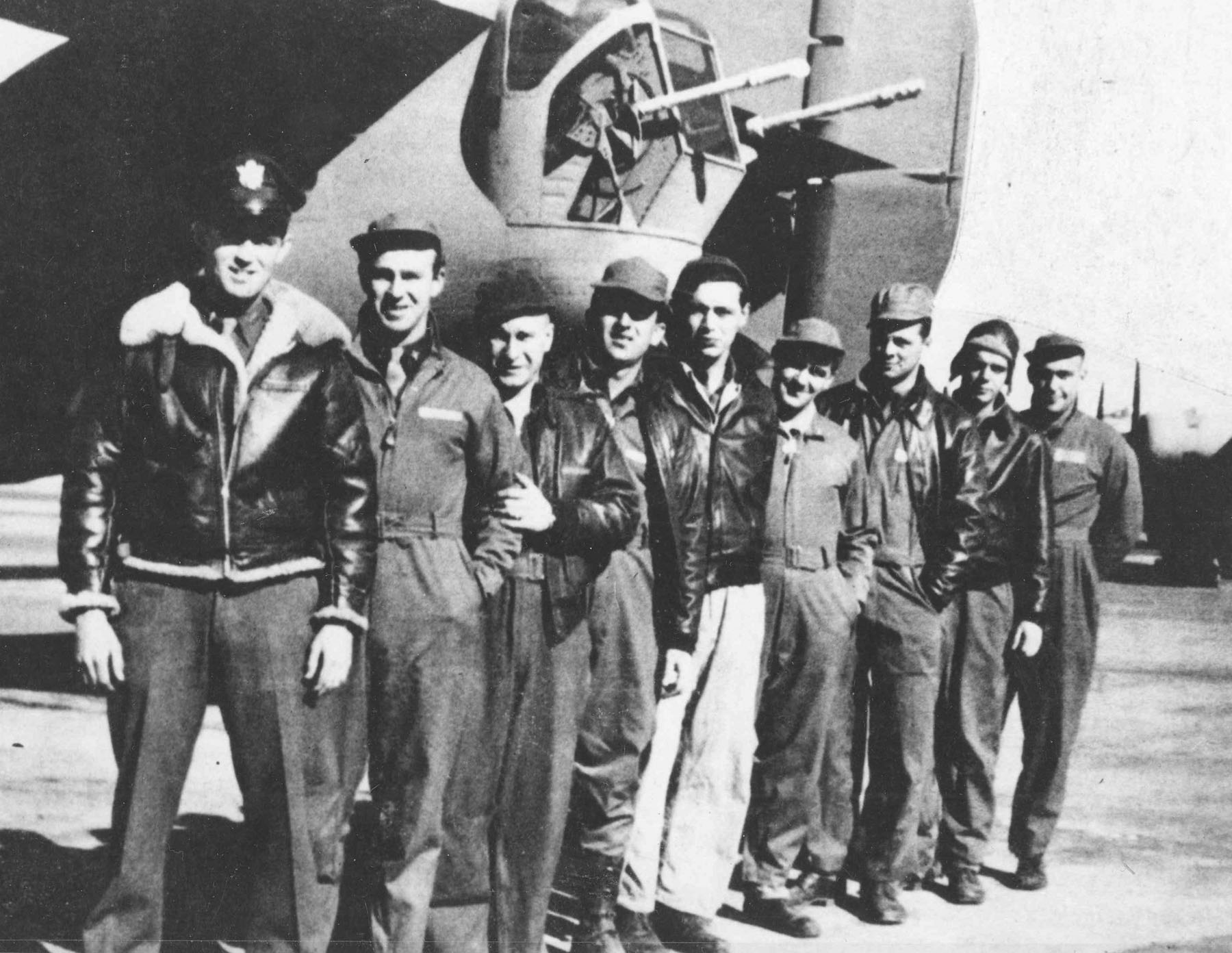
The crew of Lady Be Good; Co-pilot Toner is second from left

- Eight days after he and his crewmates were lost in the Libyan desert in the crash of Lady Be Good, co-pilot and U.S. Army 2nd. Lt. Robert Toner wrote the last entry in his journal: "No help yet, very cold nite". The diary, and Toner's body, would be found nearly 17 years later.
- On Budget Day in the United Kingdom, Chancellor of the Exchequer Sir Kingsley Wood announced that the war had cost Britain a total of £13 billion to date and was costing £15 million per day. In the new financial year excess expenditure over revenue was estimated at £2,848,614,000.

== April 13, 1943 (Tuesday) ==
- Radio Berlin announced the discovery by Wehrmacht of mass graves of 10,000 Poles killed by the Soviets in the Katyn massacre.
- In Washington, D.C., the thirty-second U.S. president, Franklin Roosevelt, dedicated the Jefferson Memorial on the bicentennial of the birth of the third American president, Thomas Jefferson.
- Died: Oskar Schlemmer, 54, German painter, sculptor, designer and choreographer associated with the Bauhaus school

== April 14, 1943 (Wednesday) ==
- The Commander of the 8th Japanese fleet broadcast a coded message concerning a tour of the fleet by the Naval Commander Admiral Isoroku Yamamoto to begin on April 18, probably in the high security code JN25 which Allied cryptanalysts had broken.
- U.S. Senator Harry S. Truman of Missouri appeared as a speaker in Chicago at the "United Rally to Demand the Rescue of Doomed Jews", calling for the United States to respond directly to the Holocaust.
- The Soviet Union reorganized its intelligence gathering system, setting up the People's Commissariat for State Security (NKGB, later the MGB) as a separate agency from the NKVD (later the KGB). Lavrentiy Beria remained in control of the NKVD, while Beria's assistant, Vsevolod Merkulov was named as the Director of the NKGB. Both Beria and Merkulov, along with four other Beria loyalists, would be executed on December 23, 1953, nine months after the death of Joseph Stalin.
- The German submarine U-526 struck a mine and sank in the Bay of Biscay. Of the crew of 54 men, 42 died.
- Four inmates of Alcatraz Federal Penitentiary attempted to escape from the prison, making it to the water when the tower guards opened fire on them. Two were killed and one hid until he was found three days later, but the body of the fourth, James Boarman, was never found.
- Died: Yakov Dzhugashvili, 36, Soviet Army officer and son of Soviet leader Joseph Stalin, was killed while attempting to escape the Sachsenhausen concentration camp in Germany, where he had been incarcerated after having been captured a prisoner of war.

== April 15, 1943 (Thursday) ==
- The U.S. Army established its first overseas "V-Mail" station in order to use the "Victory Mail" process to get letters to and from servicemen. The facility, based in Casablanca, Morocco, used the process of photographing, on microfilm, pre-screened letters to the United States so that mail could be transported to the U.S. with a minimum of space. V-Mail letters from the U.S. to servicemen were also put on microfilm, and enlarged prior to delivery.
- The State Bank of Ethiopia was created as the new central bank in the African nation, which had recently been liberated from Italian control. The State Bank also had the authority to print banknotes and mint coins. It would be replaced in 1964 by the National Bank of Ethiopia.
- The Fountainhead, a novel by Ayn Rand, was released by Bobbs-Merrill and would go on to become her first bestseller.
- The Sino-American Special Technical Cooperative Agreement was signed between the United States and the Republic of China, creating the Sino-American Cooperative Organization (SACO).
- The Italian submarine Archimede was sunk off Brazil by an American Consolidated PBY Catalina. While at least 30 survivors were spotted by Brazilian rescue planes, and three rafts were dropped for them, only one member of the 54 crew survived, and was rescued after 29 days of drifting at sea. Those who didn't drown either died from their wounds, or a lack of water.

== April 16, 1943 (Friday) ==
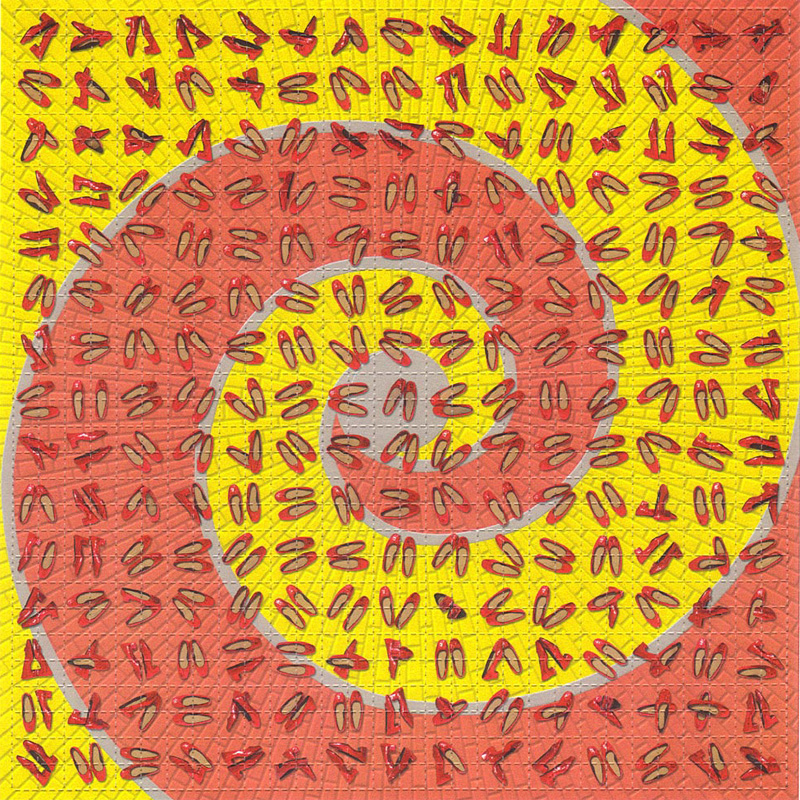
An LSD blotter paper

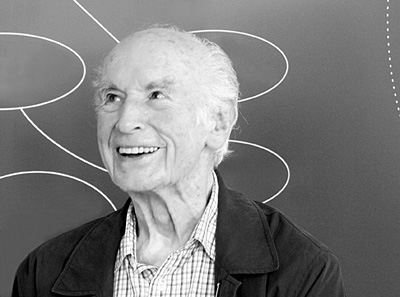
Discoverer Hoffmann

- At the Sandoz laboratories in Basel, Switzerland, biochemist Albert Hofmann accidentally ingested the drug LSD for the first time in history, and recorded the details of his experience.
- Operation I-Go ended inconclusively on orders of Imperial Japanese Admiral Yamamoto, who had been informed that the aircrews had sunk 28 Allied warships (including a cruiser and two destroyers) and shot down 175 aircraft; the actual Allied loss had been five ships and 25 aircraft, while the Japanese lost 55 aircraft. Because of his belief that the battle was a Japanese triumph, Admiral Yamamoto made the fatal decision to fly to the Solomon Islands in order to congratulate the crews.
- The Battle of the Cigno Convoy was fought southeast of Marettimo island in the Mediterranean Sea. The result was an Italian victory, albeit at the cost of 103 members of the crew of the Italian torpedo boat Cigno. The British destroyer Pakenham, which lost 10 crew, was disabled and then, after being evacuated, scuttled by the firing of a British torpedo.
- In Mexico, Ramón Mercader, a.k.a. Jacques Monard, was sentenced to 20 years in prison for assassinating Leon Trotsky with an ice pick in 1940.
- Born: Krzysztof Wodiczko, Polish-born industrial designer and media artist; in Warsaw

== April 17, 1943 (Saturday) ==
- The United States War Manpower Commission, headed by Paul V. McNutt, issued an order that prevented 27,000,000 civilian employees from changing jobs. Basically, an employee in an "essential activity" could not be hired to a job that was not essential to the war effort, unless he or she remained unemployed for at least 30 days. Likewise, a vital employer could not offer a higher wage rate to lure a worker from another vital employer without 30 days between jobs. Business owners and employees who violated the regulation were subject to a fine of up to $1,000 per violation and a year in prison. The manpower "freeze" was to remain in effect until the end of the war.
- A fleet of 117 B-17 bombers of the U.S. Eighth Army Air Force raided the German shipbuilding city of Bremen.

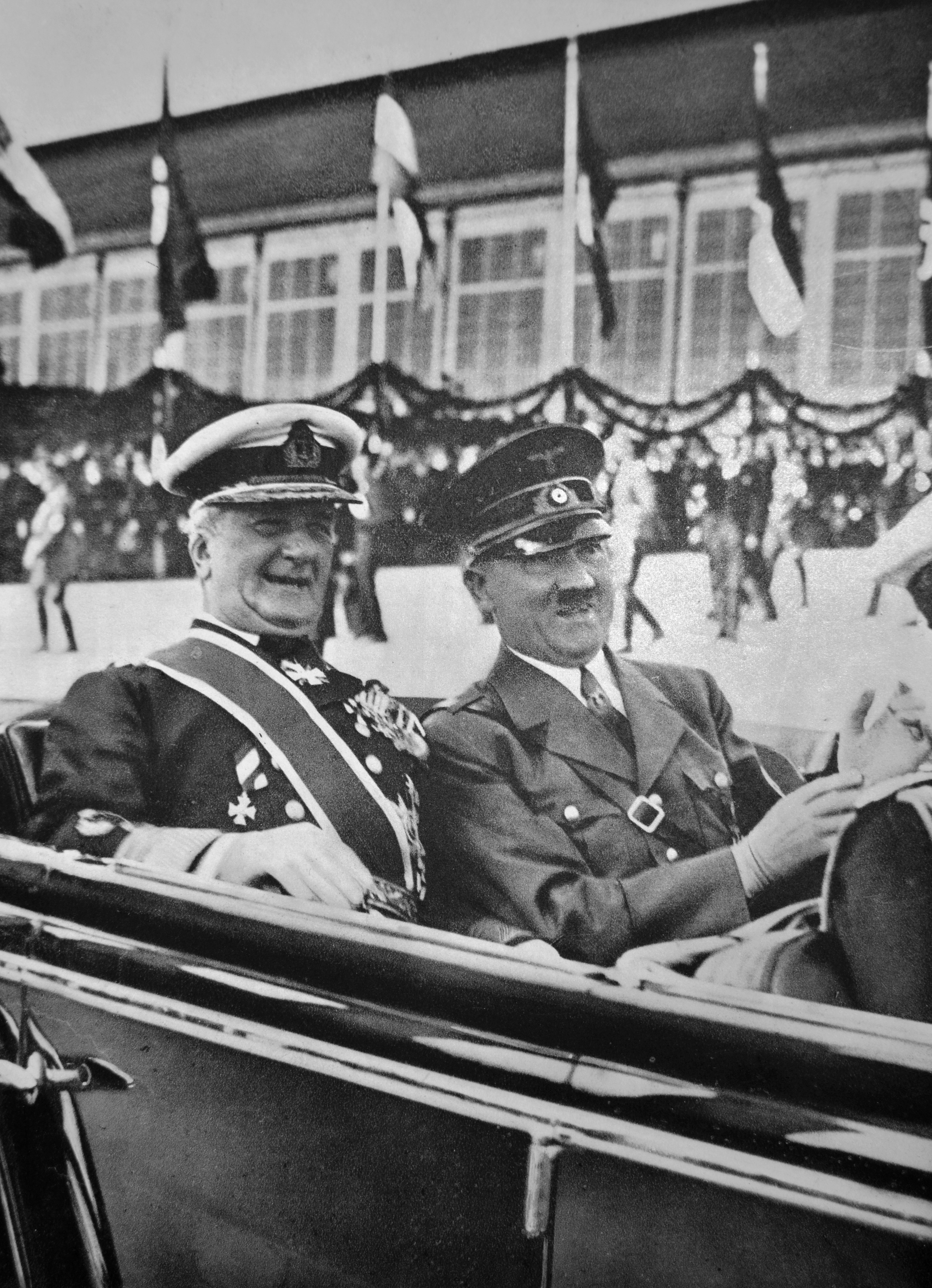
Horthy and Hitler in 1938

- At a meeting in Salzburg with German Führer Adolf Hitler and Foreign Minister Ribbentrop, Admiral Miklós Horthy, the Regent and Head of State for the Kingdom of Hungary, refused a personal request by Germany to deliver 800,000 Hungarian Jews to the Nazis, despite the alliance between the two as Axis powers.
- The German submarine U-175, with 54 crew was depth charged and sunk in the Atlantic Ocean by the U.S. Coast Guard cutter Spencer. U-175 had sunk 10 merchant ships in seven months. While 13 of the German crew died, 19 were rescued by Spencer and 22 by USCGG Duane.Blair, Clay (2000b) [1996]. Hitler's U-boat War: The Hunted, 1942–1945. New York: Modern Library. p. 282. ISBN 0-679-64033-9.
- Luftwaffe dive bombers raided the North African port of Algiers. Fifteen Catholic Religious Sisters perished at their prayers as the bombs demolished an orphanage. The 15 who died, and the three sisters who survived but were severely wounded, had remained behind to pray when the raid started while other sisters led sixty orphans from the building to the safety of an air raid shelter. Among the victims was Mother Superior Marie Duval, who had been at the convent for 31 years. General Henri Honore Giraud, civil and military commander-in-chief of French North and West Africa, awarded Duval the French Legion of Honor posthumously, stating: "On April 17, 1943, she was a victim of German barbarism, as were fourteen of her sisters."

== April 18, 1943 (Sunday) ==
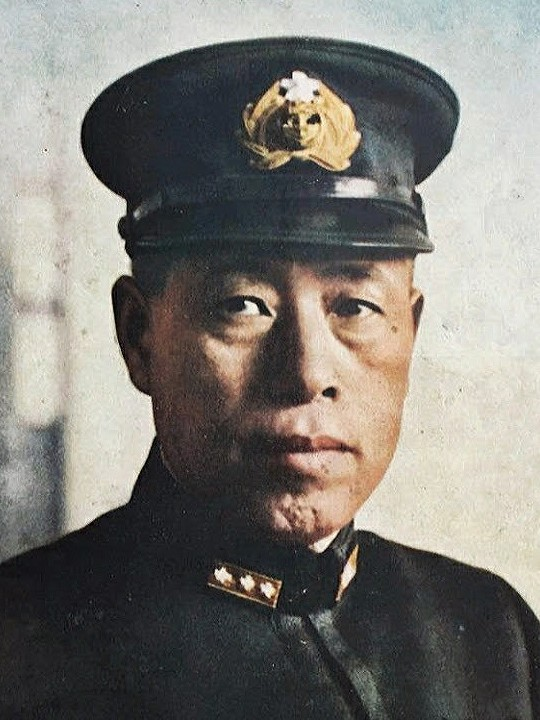
Isoroku Yamamoto

- Admiral Isoroku Yamamoto, the Commander-in-Chief of the Japanese Navy and the architect of the December 7, 1941, attack on Pearl Harbor, was killed when the plane that he was on was shot down by U.S. Army fighter pilot Rex T. Barber. American naval intelligence had intercepted and decoded a Japanese message that included the itinerary for an inspection tour that Yamamoto was making of the Solomon Islands. The body of Yamamoto, who was mortally wounded by Bougainville Island, was found the next day by a Japanese search party.
- The British submarine Regent struck a mine and sank in the Strait of Otranto.

== April 19, 1943 (Monday) ==
- Fourteen German citizens associated with the White Rose anti-Nazi resistance group were found guilty and promptly executed for crimes against the Nazi regime.
- At 8:00 am, SS Polizeifuhrer Jürgen Stroop commenced the final destruction of the Warsaw Ghetto and breaking of the Warsaw Ghetto Uprising, with German SS troops fighting the Jewish resistance. The operation would not be completed until May 16. The Jewish defenders would kill 16 Germans and wound 85.
- The escape of 233 Belgian Jews from a train bound for Auschwitz was made possible by a raid by three members of the Belgian resistance movement. The train was halted shortly after it had departed the concentration camp at Mechelen with 1,631 internees, bound for the Auschwitz concentration camp. Of the 233 who fled, 118 were able to get away. Another 89 were recaptured, and 26 were killed.
- Biochemist Albert Hofmann followed up his accidental experience of three days earlier by intentionally ingesting 250 μg of lysergic acid diethylamide in an attempt to bioassay the substance.
- Winston Churchill announced in the House of Commons that restrictions on the ringing of church bells throughout Britain would be lifted now that the threat of German invasion had passed.
- Gérard Côté won the Boston Marathon.

== April 20, 1943 (Tuesday) ==
- In Tunisia, Bernard Montgomery approved an uncharacteristically aggressive series of small attacks against strongly defended Axis positions at Enfidha. Heavy Allied casualties resulted.
- The RAF marked Hitler's 54th birthday by bombing Berlin and three other cities. Hitler himself passed the day quietly at the Berghof.
- Mamoru Shigemitsu, Japan's Minister of Greater East Asia, was selected by Prime Minister Tojo to be the new Japanese Minister for Foreign Affairs, replacing Masayuki Tani.
- Born: John Eliot Gardiner, English conductor; in Fontmell Magna, Dorset

== April 21, 1943 (Wednesday) ==
- The bombing of Aberdeen killed 98 civilians and 27 servicemen. The attack was the worst of 34 separate German air raids on the Scottish city.
- Admiral Mineichi Koga became the new Commander of the Japanese Navy, succeeding the late Admiral Yamamoto.
- The British submarine Splendid was shelled and damaged off Corsica, with the loss of 18 of her 48 crew, by the German destroyer Hermes. The surviving crew of Splendid, which had sunk eight Axis freighters and (on December 17, 1942) the Italian destroyer Aviere and 220 of its 250 crew, scuttled their ship to prevent capture.
- Captain Frederick M. Trapnell became the first U.S. Navy aviator to fly a jet airplane, when he took up the Bell P-59 from the Muroc Army Air Field (now Edwards Air Force Base) in California. Colonel Laurence C. Craigie of the U.S. Army had flown the P-59 on October 2, 1942.

== April 22, 1943 (Thursday) ==
- The American submarine Grenadier was scuttled by its crew the next day off of the coast of Thailand, the day after being bombed by Japanese aircraft in the Strait of Malacca. The Japanese ship Choko Maru picked up the 76 crew (eight officers and 68 enlisted men), took them as prisoners of war, and then tortured and interrogated them without results. However, all but 72 of the Grenadier crew survived their ordeal.
- The final Allied attack on Tunisia began with the opening of the five-day Battle of Longstop Hill.
- The Battles of Bobdubi and Mubo began between Australian and Japanese forces in the Territory of New Guinea and would continue for almost several months, with Australian troops of the 17th Brigade defeating the Japanese defenders of Mubo by July 14, and two brigades the Australian Army capturing Bobdubi on August 19.
- Born: Louise Glück, American poet laureate, 2003—2004; in New York City (d. 2023)

== April 23, 1943 (Friday) ==
- SS Polizeifuhrer Jürgen Stroop carried out the order by Heinrich Himmler to burn down all of the buildings in the Warsaw Ghetto.
- The German submarines U-189 (with all 54 crew) and U-191 (with all 55 crew) were both lost to British action in the Atlantic Ocean, while U-602 (with more than 44 aboard) went missing on patrol in the Mediterranean Sea.
- Born:
  - Tony Esposito, Canadian ice hockey goaltender and Hockey Hall of Fame inductee, three time Vezina Trophy winner for fewest goals allowed in a season; in Sault Ste. Marie, Ontario (d. 2021)
  - Gail Goodrich, American basketball player and Basketball Hall of Fame inductee; in Los Angeles
  - "Fighting Harada" (Masahiko Harada), Japanese professional boxer, world bantamweight champion 1965–1968, in Tokyo
  - Hervé Villechaize, French television actor who portrayed "Tattoo" on Fantasy Island, in Paris (committed suicide 1993)

== April 24, 1943 (Saturday) ==
- The Fire Department of New York (FDNY) responded to a fire on the munitions ship SS El Estero that threatened to destroy the port. The ship had been loading torpedoes at a pier used by the U.S. Army, caught fire, and began drifting after burning through the lines that tied it to the dock. The FDNY fireboat, Fire Fighter spent seven harrowing hours towing the ship away and then inundating it with enough water to sink it. An explosion of the ship could have set off a chain reaction that would have blown up other ammunition ships, tanks of natural gas, gasoline and oil on the shore, and "the largest ammunition dump in the U.S.", located on the New Jersey shore. Twelve years later, an author would describe the event as "the night New York City almost blew up".
- The British submarine Sahib was scuttled after being depth charged and damaged off Capo di Milazzo, Sicily by a Luftwaffe Junkers Ju 88. All but one of its 48 crew survived and were taken as prisoners of war by the Italian Navy.
- The German submarine U-710 was sunk in the North Atlantic by a B-17 of No. 206 Squadron RAF. All 49 of the crew of U-710 were lost.
- Died:
  - Kurt von Hammerstein-Equord, 64, German general and anti-Nazi, died of cancer.
  - Kenneth Whiting, 61, U.S. Navy Commander described as the "father of the aircraft carrier", died of a heart attack while hospitalized for pneumonia.

== April 25, 1943 (Sunday) ==
- Easter occurred on the latest possible date. The last time it had happened had been on April 25, 1886, and the next time will be on April 25, 2038.
- The German submarine U-203, which had sunk 21 merchant ships, was depth-charged and sunk off Cape Farewell, Greenland by British aircraft and the Royal Navy destroyer Pathfinder. Of the 48 crew, 38 were rescued.
- Born: James G. Mitchell, Canadian-born computer scientist; in Kitchener, Ontario

== April 26, 1943 (Monday) ==
- The five-day Battle of Longstop Hill during the Tunisia Campaign ended in British victory, with the British breaking through the last German-defended barrier to the road to Tunis, which they would capture on May 7.
- The aircraft carrier USS Intrepid was launched from Newport News, Virginia, and would be commissioned on August 16.
- The Easter Riots broke out on the day after Easter during a demonstration by the Swedish fascist Svensk Socialistisk Samling (SSS) when anti-fascist protesters clashed with members attending the SSS national convention in Uppsala, Sweden.
- Born: Dominik Duka, Czech Roman Catholic priest and Archbishop of Prague; in Hradec Králové, in the German "Protectorate of Bohemia and Moravia" (now the Czech Republic)

== April 27, 1943 (Tuesday) ==
- The four-day Battle of Hill 609 began between the U.S. Army's II Corps and Germany's Afrika Korps near Dejbel Tahent in Bizerte in French Tunisia. The battle would end on May 1 with an American victory and 2,453 U.S. casualties.
- Because of German labor needs occasioned by World War II, Heinrich Himmler directed concentration camps to avoid murdering those persons who were able to work, and to make it a priority to execute "the mentally ill who could not work".
- The German submarine U-174 was depth charged and sunk with the loss of all 53 crew, south of Newfoundland, by an American Lockheed Ventura airplane.

== April 28, 1943 (Wednesday) ==
- SS Kamakura Maru, a Japanese troop ship that had been converted from the ocean liner Chichibu Maru, was torpedoed and sunk in the Pacific Ocean by the American submarine USS Gudgeon, with the loss of 2,035 of the 2,500 people on board.
- Seven British Commandos of No. 14 (Arctic) Commando, led by Royal Navy Lt. John Godwin, began Operation Checkmate, a 17-day raid on shipping at Haugesund, Norway. While the group did sink a German ship, they would be captured and be executed at the Sachsenhausen and Belsen concentration camps.
- Born:
  - John O. Creighton, American astronaut on three space shuttle missions; in Orange, Texas
  - Jim Northrup, American Indian (Ojibway) humorist and author; in Cloquet, Minnesota (d. 2016)

== April 29, 1943 (Thursday) ==
- The Allied shipping Convoy ONS 5 of 42 ships and seven escorts, traveling from Liverpool to Halifax, came under attack by the first of 43 German U-boats. Over an eight-day period, the convoy lost 13 ships totaling 63,000 tons, along with 148 ship crew. The escorts had sunk seven U-boats and 348 German sailors and officers. This period is considered a turning point in the Battle of the Atlantic (known as Black May). The American freighter SS McKeesport was the first of the ONS 5 freighters to be torpedoed and sunk.
- The German submarine U-332 was depth charged and sunk in the Bay of Biscay, by a B-23 bomber of No. 224 Squadron RAF.
- Died: Canadian soldier August Sangret, 29, was hanged in London's Wandsworth Prison, after being convicted of killing his girlfriend Joan Wolfe, in what was called "The Wigwam Murder".

== April 30, 1943 (Friday) ==
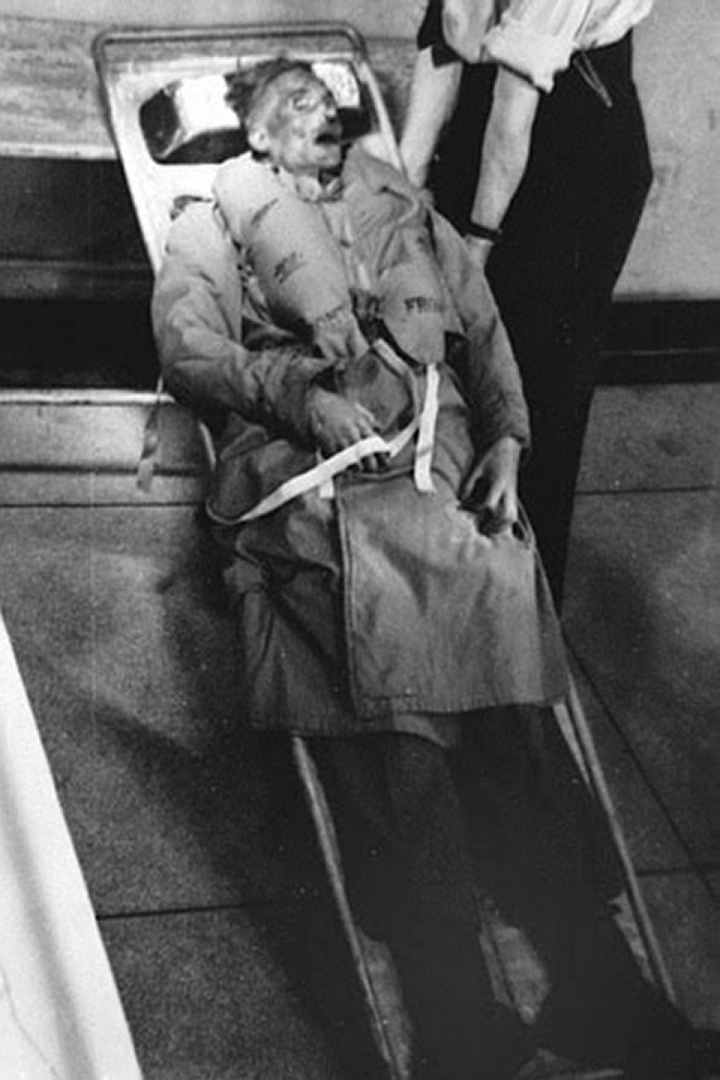
The body of Glyndwr Michael, dressed as "Major Martin"

- The body of "Major Martin" of Britain's Royal Marines was dumped into the Mediterranean Sea off of the coast of Spain, near Huelva, by the British submarine HMS Seraph. As part of Operation Mincemeat, a plot to deceive German intelligence, "Major Martin" had on his person, fake plans for an Allied invasion of the European continent. The body of "Royal Marines Major William Martin" would be revealed in 1996 to have been Glyndwr Michael, a homeless, 36-year-old Welshman who had died on January 28, 1943, from ingesting rat poison.
- The German submarine U-227 was depth charged and sunk, with all 49 crew, north of the Faroe Islands by a Handley Page Hampden of No. 455 Squadron RAAF.
- Born: Frederick Chiluba, second President of Zambia (1991–2002); in Kitwe, Northern Rhodesia (now Zambia) (d. 2011)
