= Changjiao massacre =

1943 massacre of Chinese people by Japan

Coordinates: 29°9′20″N 112°14′43″E

- Part of the Battle of Changde, Operation 5 in the Second Sino-Japanese War, the China Burma India Theater and the Pacific Theater of World War II
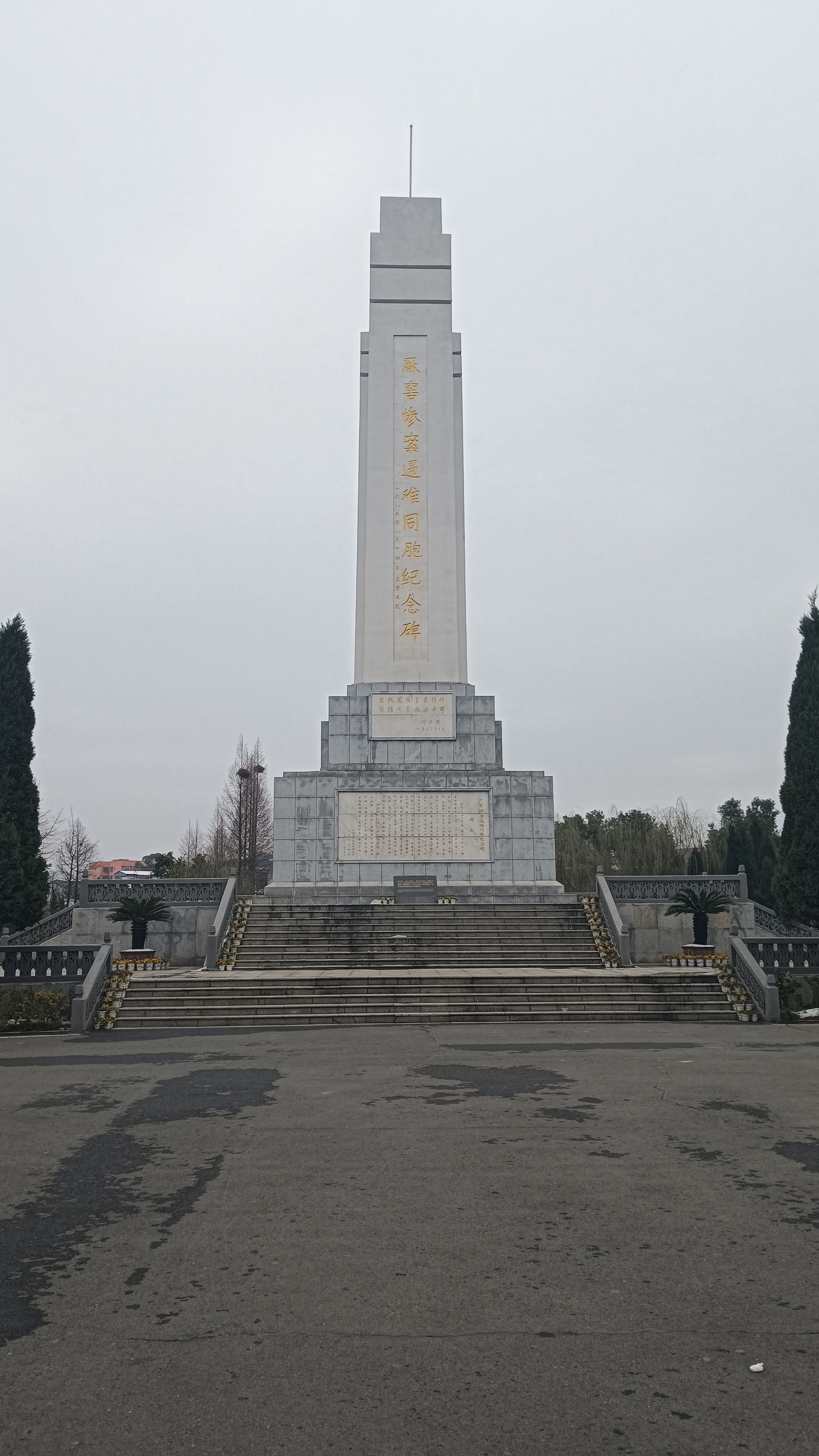
- Monument to the massacre
- Location: Changjiao, Hunan province, Republic of China
- Date: 9 May 1943 – 12 May 1943
- Target: Chinese soldiers and civilians in Changjiao town and civilians in surrounding areas
- Attack type: Massacre, mass murder, summary execution, war crime and rape
- Deaths: 30,000
- Injuries: 3,000+
- Perpetrator: China Expeditionary Army
- Motive: Ultranationalism, Japanese imperialism, Sinophobia

The Changjiao massacre (simplified Chinese: 厂窖惨案; traditional Chinese: 廠窖慘案) was a massacre of Chinese civilians by the China Expeditionary Army, a general army of the Imperial Japanese Army, in Changjiao, Hunan during the early stage of the Battle of West Hubei. Gen. Shunroku Hata was the commander of the Japanese forces. Over a period of four days, from May 9 to May 12, 1943, Hata's troops killed more than 25,000 civilians and 5,000 Chinese soldiers. Victims included 7,000 residents of Changjiao town, 12,000 refugees who fled to Changjiao, 5,000 officers and soldiers of the 73rd Corps and other units of the Kuomintang, and more than 6,000 civilians in areas near Changjiao.

== See also ==
- List of massacres in China
- Japanese war crimes
- Nanjing massacre
- Battle of West Hubei
