= Philip Slier =

Dutch typesetter

- Slier in 1942
- Born: Philip Slier; 4 December 1923; Amsterdam, Netherlands
- Died: 9 April 1943 (aged 19); Sobibor extermination camp, German-occupied Poland
- Occupation: Typesetter

Philip "Flip" Slier (4 December 1923 – 9 April 1943) was a Dutch typesetter of Jewish origin who lived in Amsterdam during the German occupation of the Netherlands in World War II. At the age of 18, he received a letter from the Jewish Council of Amsterdam—under orders from the German occupiers—that he was to report to Camp Molengoot or face arrest. He wrote 86 letters from 25 April to 14 September 1942 detailing his experiences as a forced labourer at the labour camp. Eventually he escaped to Amsterdam and lived as an onderduiker (a person in hiding); he frequently disguised himself and moved to different hiding locations to evade detection.

On 3 March 1943, before he could escape to Switzerland, he was apprehended by the Schutzstaffel (SS) at the Amsterdam Centraal railway station for not wearing a yellow star badge indicating that he was a Jew. He was taken to two concentration camps before being killed by gas at the Sobibor extermination camp in Poland just over a month later. In accordance with his wishes, his parents kept the letters hidden and they were discovered over 50 years later. They were given to the NIOD Institute for War, Holocaust and Genocide Studies, and eventually came into the possession of Slier's first cousin, Deborah Slier in 1999. She compiled the letters and published them with comprehensive research on his life in Hidden Letters (2008).

== Late adolescence ==
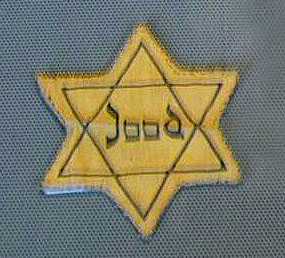
Badge that was required by the law to be worn by Jews, with the Dutch word for them, "Jood", in the center

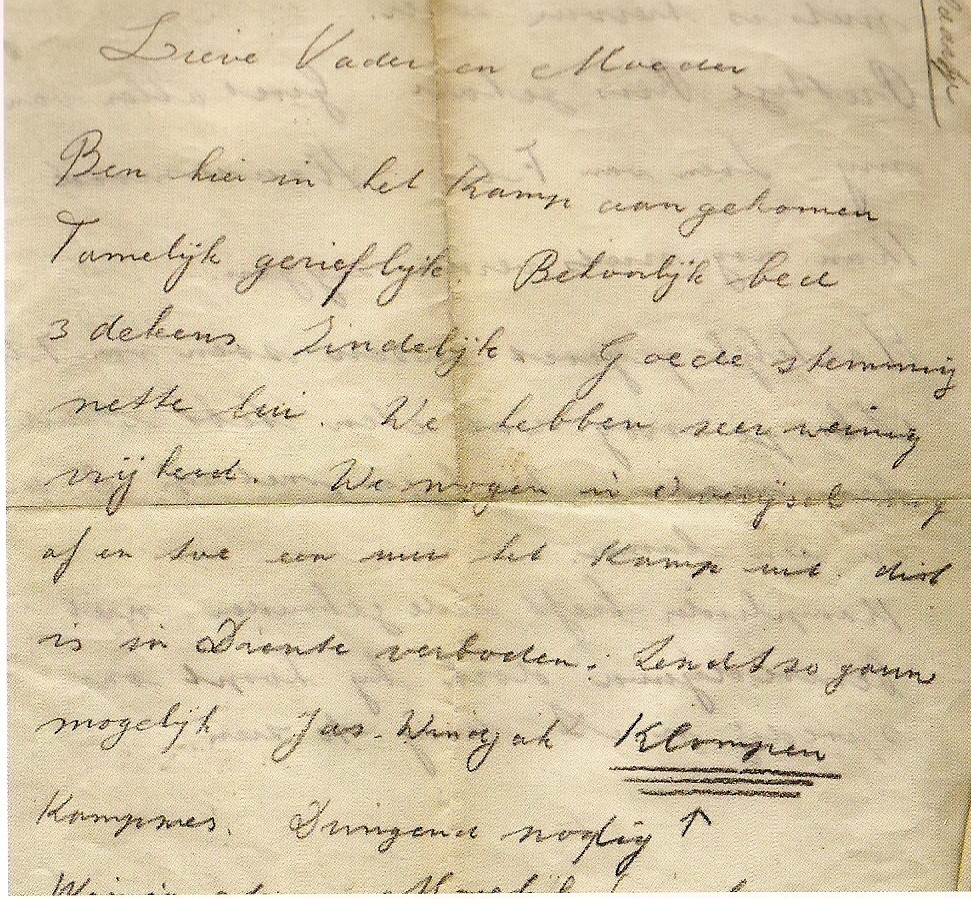
Slier's first letter, written on 25 April 1942

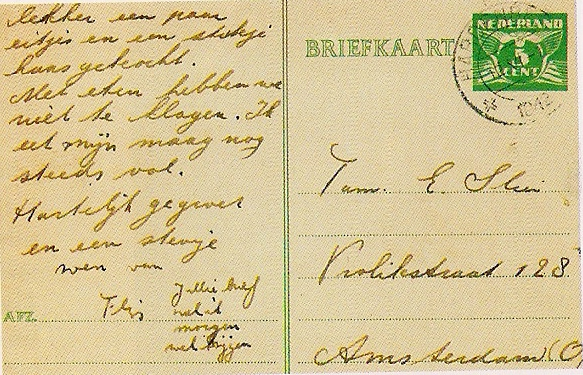
His postcard, dated 12 June 1942

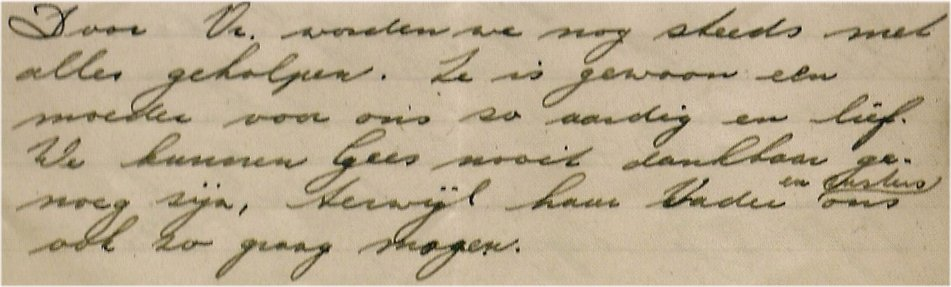
His last letter, written on 14 September 1942

The Germans invaded the Netherlands in May 1940, when he was 16 years old. The Germans in occupied Netherlands ordered that all Jews over the age of six had to wear a six pointed yellow star symbol on their outer clothing, for easy identification, to be the size of a saucer.

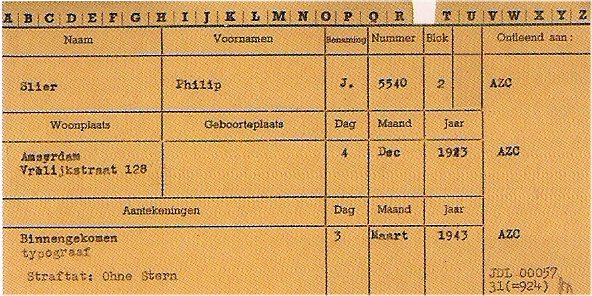
German Schutzstaffel SS prisoner file card 3 March 1943 shows he was arrested for not wearing a yellow star badge on his outer clothing

He was transported to Vught concentration camp, North Brabant, in the south of the Netherlands.
