= Changjiao =

Changjiao Town 厂窖镇
- Town
- Location in Hunan
- Coordinates: 29°09′21″N 112°14′44″E
- Country: People's Republic of China
- Province: Hunan
- Prefecture-level city: Yiyang
- County: Nan County

Area
  - Total: 68 km^{2} (26 sq mi)

Population
  - Total: 38,300
  - Density: 560/km^{2} (1,500/sq mi)
- Time zone: UTC+8 (China Standard)
- Area code: 0737

Changjiao Town (simplified Chinese: 厂窖镇; traditional Chinese: 廠窖鎮; pinyin: Chǎngjiào Zhèn) is an urban town in and subdivision of Nan County, Hunan Province, People's Republic of China.

== Administrative divisions ==
The town is divided into 18 villages and 1 community, which include the following areas: Haocheng Community, Sile Village, Xianfeng Village, Defu Village, Yongxing Village, Dongfeng Village, Jianan Village, Quancheng Village, Lianhe Village, Wuyi Village, Quangu Village, Xiaojiawan Village, Lianfu Village, Tongxi Village, Xizhou Village, Xingfu Village, and Bajiaoshan Village (浩成社区、思乐村、先锋村、德伏村、永兴村、东风村、浃南村、全成村、玉成村、连和村、五一村、全固村、肖家湾村、连伏村、同西村、西洲村、幸伏村、西伏村、八角山村).
