= Battle of Hill 609 =

Battle in Tunisia during WWII

- Part of Operation Vulcan, the Tunisian campaign
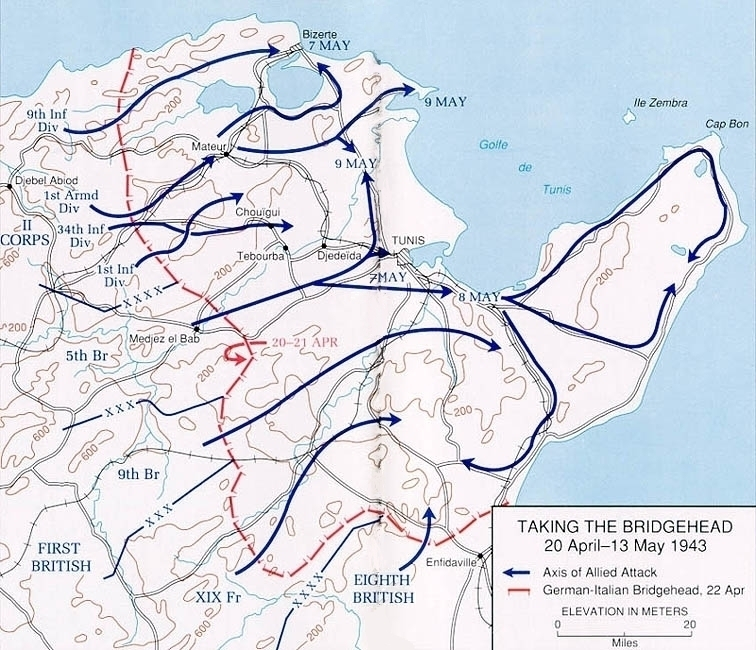
- Tunisian campaign operations 20 April to 13 May 1943.
Date	27 April – 1 May 1943
Location	36°54′8″N 9°29′40″E; Djebel Tahent, Tunisia
Result	American victory

Belligerents
United States	Germany

Commanders and leaders
(United States) Omar Bradley (United States) Charles W. Ryder (United States) Terry Allen	(Nazi Germany) Hans-Jürgen von Arnim

Strength
II Corps	Afrika Korps

Casualties and losses
2,453	Unknown

The Battle of Hill 609 took place at Djebel Tahent in northwestern Tunisia during the Tunisian campaign of World War II. The battle, part of Operation Vulcan, was for control over the key strategic height known as Hill 609 and its surrounding area between the American forces of the U.S. II Corps and German units of the Afrika Korps. It proved a formative experience for the American forces - in their first clear-cut victory of the campaign, and has been called "the American Army's coming-of-age."

== Battle ==
In late April 1943, Hill 609 was the key to the German defensive line facing the U.S. II Corps, commanded by Major General Omar Bradley. The German general, Hans-Jürgen von Arnim, deployed the Paratroop Regiment Barenthin, which was actually only three battalions, to fortify the hill, which had arrived in November 1942 for the purpose of protecting the German bridgeheads in Tunis. used the hill for artillery fire and observation. By fortifying the hill, the Germans could also prevent movement by both the 1st Infantry Division, commanded by Major General Terry Allen, to the south and the 9th Infantry Division, commanded by Major General Manton S. Eddy, to the north. Hill 609 was deemed one of the most difficult objectives in Tunisia, not only protected by steep slopes and artillery but also by fire from nearby high grounds, which gave the Germans a cross fire on the slopes leading up to it. After rejecting the proposition of bypassing the mountain, Bradley ordered the 34th Infantry Division, commanded by Major General Charles W. Ryder, to take the hill.

After heavy fighting and high casualties, the 34th Division managed to take the hill by April 30 and the following day repelled several German counterattacks. The German regiment was severely depleted and most were taken prisoners.

== See also ==
- List of equipment of the United States Army during World War II
- List of German military equipment of World War II
- North African campaign
- Tunisian campaign
