= July 1943 =

Month of 1943

<<	July 1943					>>
Su	Mo	Tu	We	Th	Fr	Sa
				1	2	3
4	5	6	7	8	9	10
11	12	13	14	15	16	17
18	19	20	21	22	23	24
25	26	27	28	29	30	31

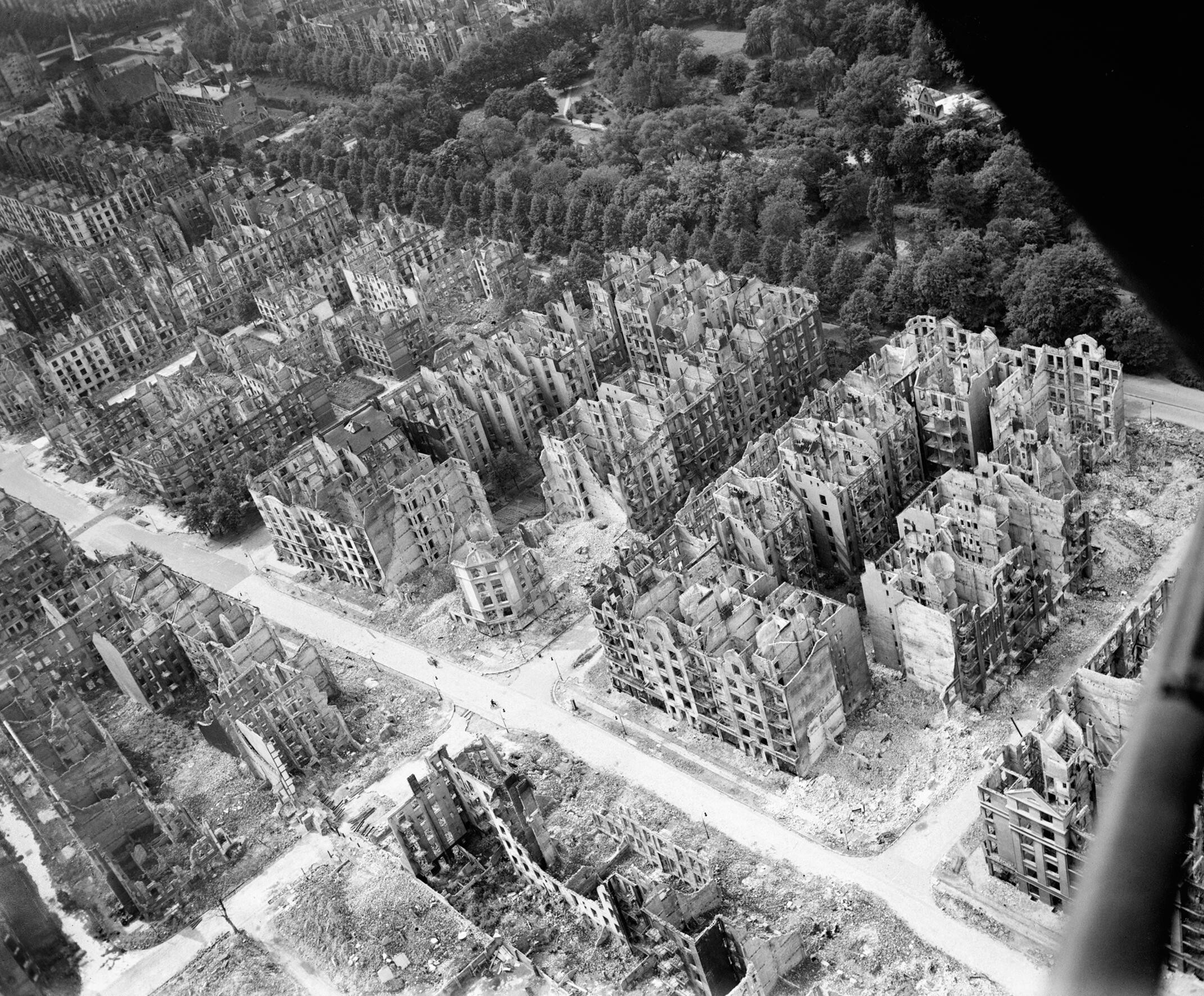
July 25, 1943: Allied bombers begin the destruction of Hamburg and 30,000 people

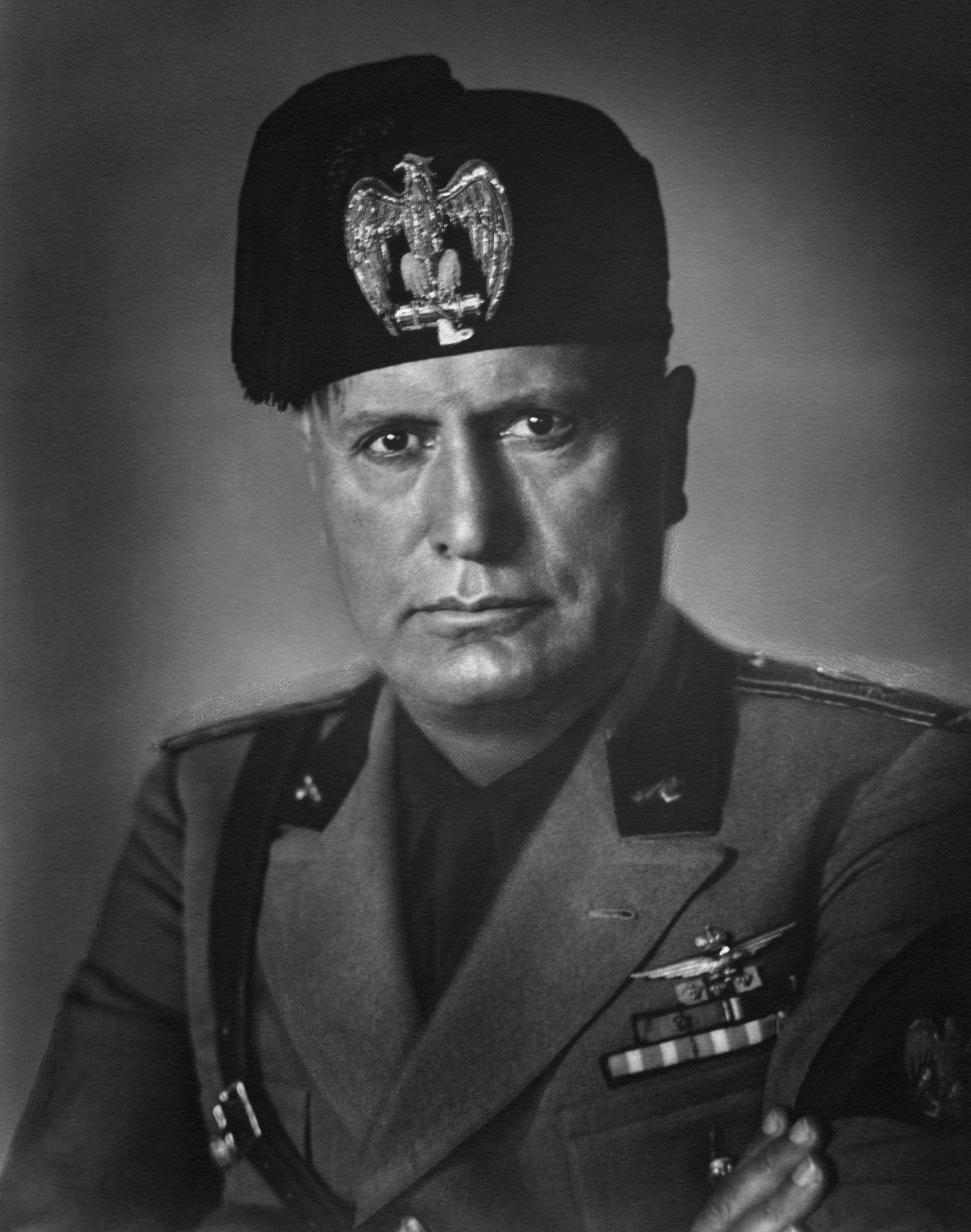
July 25, 1943: The reign of Il Duce, Benito Mussolini, ends in Italy after 17 years

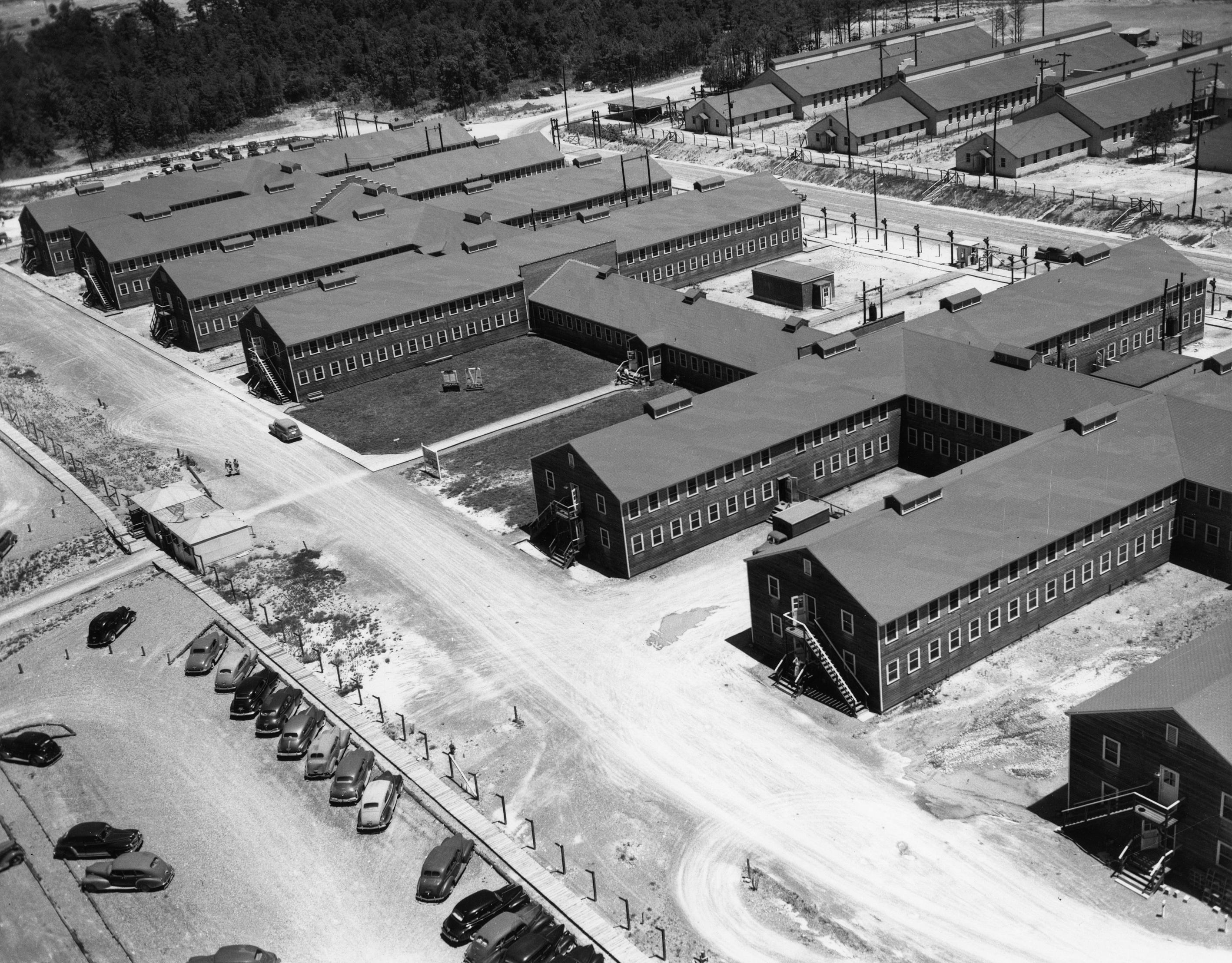
July 3, 1943: Residents begin moving into the "secret city", Oak Ridge, Tennessee

The following events occurred in July 1943:

== July 1, 1943 (Thursday) ==
- The death sentence, for treason, of German-born American Max Stephan was commuted by U.S. President Roosevelt to life imprisonment, seven hours before Stephan was to be hanged. Stephan had been convicted of harboring a German prisoner of war who had escaped from a POW camp in Ontario.
- The United States Women's Army Corps (WAC) was converted to full status, changing its name from the Women's Auxiliary Army Corps, and U.S. Army Major Oveta Culp Hobby was the first Director.
- The Nurse Training Act was passed by the United States Congress, creating the U.S. Cadet Nurse Corps.
- Adolf Eichmann was granted full authority by Martin Bormann to use the Gestapo in enforcement of "the permanent elimination of Jews from the territories of Greater Germany".
- U.S. forces defeated the Japanese in the three-day Battle of Viru Harbor on the island of New Georgia in the Solomon Islands. The Japanese loss was 61 soldiers of its 245 soldiers killed and the U.S. lost 13.
- Romanian Foreign Minister Mihai Antonescu met with the Italian dictator Benito Mussolini in Rome and pleaded with him to lead a bid by the countries aligned with Germany to leave the Axis. Mussolini refused to commit to the plan.
- An Investigation of Global Policy with the Yamato Race as Nucleus, a six-volume secret report compiled by the Population and Race Section of the Research Bureau of Japan's Ministry of Health and Welfare, was completed and submitted to the Prime Minister, setting the blueprint for imposing Japanese names, the Japanese language and the Shinto religion on all minorities within the Empire.
- Tokyo City was administratively merged with its prefecture to form the special wards of Tokyo.

== July 2, 1943 (Friday) ==
- New Georgia, the largest of the Solomon Islands controlled by Japan, was invaded by the U.S. 37th and 43rd Infantry divisions, striking from Rendova Island and beginning the Drive on Munda Point. After fierce resistance from the Japanese occupiers for more than a month and thousands of casualties on both sides, the New Georgia airfield at Munda would be captured on August 5, and the entire island would be secured by August 25.

== July 3, 1943 (Saturday) ==
- The new town of Oak Ridge, Tennessee, constructed for workers on the secret atomic bomb project, had its first residents arrive, as a family moved into a trailer on the 92 square mile area. Within two years, it would have 75,000 people, but its existence would be kept hidden until after World War II.
- The three day Battle of Wickham Anchorage at Vangunu in the Solomon Islands ended in a U.S. victory over the Japanese Army, with 25 Americans and 141 Japanese killed.
- The German submarines U-126, with 55 crew, and U-628, with 49, were both depth charged and sunk northwest of Cape Ortegal, Spain by British aircraft. There were no survivors. U-628 had sunk 24 merchant ships and a Royal Navy landing craft.
- "Comin' in on a Wing and a Prayer" by The Song Spinners topped the Billboard singles chart.
- Born:
  - Kurtwood Smith, American film and TV actor known for Robocop and That '70s Show;, in New Lisbon, Wisconsin
  - Judith Durham, Australian singer (The Seekers); in Essendon, Victoria (d. 2022)

== July 4, 1943 (Sunday) ==
- Subhas Chandra Bose became the new President of the Indian Independence League, which was meeting in the Cathay Theater in Japanese-occupied Singapore.
- The American Forces Radio Network (which became the United States Armed Forces Network) was created to broadcast from 55 low-power transmitters near areas in the United Kingdom where American servicemen were stationed.
- The British troopship City of Venice was torpedoed and sunk north of Ténès, Algeria by German submarine U-409. All but 22 of the 158 crew of the ship survived, with 20 of the crew dying when their lifeboat capsized.
- Born: Geraldo Rivera, American reporter and talk show host; in Brooklyn, New York City
- Died: General Władysław Sikorski, 62, Prime Minister of Poland 1922–1923, leader of the Polish government-in-exile after the German conquest of 1939, was killed in a plane crash along with 14 other people including British Army Brigadier General J. P. Whitehead, a British MP, leading to a controversy over his death.

== July 5, 1943 (Monday) ==
- The Battle of Kursk, the largest tank battle in history, began when Germany launched an attack on the Soviet city of Kursk with 20 infantry divisions and 3,000 tanks. Two days later, the Soviet Union launched a counteroffensive against the Germans. By the time the battle ended on August 5, the Germans had lost 70,000 men and 2,900 of the 3,000 tanks.
- The American and Japanese navies fought the Battle of Kula Gulf off Kolombangara in the Solomon Islands. The battle was inconclusive, with Japan succeeding in landing 1,600 troops at Vila. The lost 2 destroyers and 324 people, 300 of whom were on the Niizuki , while the U.S. Navy lost the light cruiser USS Helena and 168 of the ship's crew.
- The American destroyer USS Strong was sunk, with the loss of 46 of its crew, in the Kula Gulf by the Japanese destroyer Niizuki and shore batteries. The torpedo from Niizuki was fired from a distance of 13 miles (21 km) (11 nautical miles) for the longest-range torpedo kill in history.
- The German submarine U-535 was depth charged and sunk northeast of Cape Finisterre, Spain by a B-24 Liberator of No. 53 Squadron RAF, with the loss of its 48 crew.
- Film actress Betty Grable was married to bandleader Harry James at a ceremony in Las Vegas.
- Born: Robbie Robertson, Canadian musician and songwriter for The Band; in Toronto (d. 2023)

== July 6, 1943 (Tuesday) ==
- The town of Boise City, Oklahoma was mistakenly bombed by a U.S. Army Air Forces plane that had taken off from the nearby Dalhart Army Air Base in Texas. The pilot, sent on a training mission to drop explosives on a practice range near Conlen, Texas, got off course, mistook Boise City for the range, and dropped five bombs on the town. Although there was slight damage to buildings, nobody was injured, and the air raid was stopped after the town was blacked out by an alert power plant worker.
- The two-day Battle of Kula Gulf between U.S. and Japanese warships off the island of Kolombangara ended inconclusively.
- Yeshwantrao Holkar II, the 33-year-old Maharaja of Indore, described as "one of the wealthiest men in the world", was granted a divorce from his American wife, the Maharanee Margaret Lawlor, in proceedings in Reno, Nevada.

== July 7, 1943 (Wednesday) ==
- Southern Airways was incorporated by Frank Hulse and Ike Jones, in order to seek approval from the Civil Aeronautics Board to operate a civilian airline after the end of World War II. In later years, the company would merge with another carrier to become Republic Airlines, which would then be acquired by Northwest Airlines, which in turn would be acquired by Delta Air Lines.
- Reverend Jóhannes Gunnarsson became the first Roman Catholic Bishop of Iceland since the Reformation, in services held in Washington, D.C.
- Died: Rudolph Forster, 70, Chief Clerk of the White House Executive Offices since 1897. His obituary described him as "virtually unknown to the public, but for 46 years highly esteemed and frequently honored by the nation's presidents", and he served for eight U.S. Presidents, from William McKinley to Franklin D. Roosevelt.

== July 8, 1943 (Thursday) ==
- The Jamaica Labour Party, which rivals the People's National Party, was founded by Alexander Bustamante.
- The German submarine U-514 was lost with all 54 of its crew near Cape Finisterre after being struck by rockets from an RAF B-24 bomber.
- Born:
  - Joel Siegel, American film critic for Good Morning America; in Los Angeles (d. 2007);
  - Guido Marzulli, Italian painter; in Bari
- Died:
  - Sir Harry Oakes, 68, American-born British entrepreneur, was found beaten to death in his mansion in Nassau in the Bahamas. The search for Oakes, described once as one of the two wealthiest men in America, was made after he failed to appear for a scheduled golf game with the Duke of Windsor, the former King who had become the British Governor of the Bahamas. The case was never solved, and the murderer of Oakes was never discovered.
  - Jean Moulin, 44, a leader of the French Resistance against the Nazi German occupation of France, died after being tortured by the Nazi Gestapo.
  - Edward Haight, 17, became the youngest person to ever die in the electric chair in New York, as he was executed for the September murder of two young girls ten months earlier.
  - Levi Mosley, a seasonal farm laborer, died in a hospital in Norfolk, Virginia. When Mosley failed to report to his local draft board in December, the FBI would be called in and begin a nine-year search for Mosley, which would not end until 1953 when his death was discovered.

== July 9, 1943 (Friday) ==
- A German air raid killed 108 people, many of them children, in a movie theater, in the British town of East Grinstead. Schoolchildren were inside the Whitehall Cinema, watching a Hopalong Cassidy film, when air raid sirens sounded. At 5:17 pm, a wave of German bombers struck the town, leveling the theater with one bomb, followed by a second. Another 235 people were seriously injured.
- The United States Congress recessed for the first time in four years, after the nation's legislators had passed on vacations since 1939.
- The German submarines U-232 (with 46 crew), U-435 and U-590(with 45 crew) were lost to enemy action in the Atlantic Ocean. Both were sunk by There were no survivors.
- Born: Soledad Miranda, Spanish-born Portuguese actress; in Seville (killed in car wreck, 1970)

== July 10, 1943 (Saturday) ==
- The Allied invasion of Sicily began as U.S., British and Canadian forces landed on the large Italian island at 0245 GMT (4:45 am local time), with the U.S. Third Infantry Division, codenamed the "Dime Force", coming ashore at the beaches of the port city of Licata. The Seventh United States Army and the British Eighth Army arrived with 180,000 men on 2,590 ships in "the largest sea-borne assault" of World War II. Defending Sicily were 230,000 Italian and 40,000 German troops. Earlier, the Allies released 147 military gliders from towing aircraft, to glide in silently. Of those, 69 were released too early and landed in the ocean, drowning 252 men. Only 12 of the 147 gliders landed in the target area.
- The American destroyer USS Maddox was bombed and sunk off Gela, Sicily by an Italian Junkers Ju 87. The sinking took place in two minutes, with the loss of 210 of the ship's 284 crew.
- Born: Arthur Ashe, African-American tennis player, winner of titles at U.S. Open (1968), Australian Open (1970) and Wimbledon (1975); in Richmond, Virginia (d. 1993)

== July 11, 1943 (Sunday) ==
- The British Army captured the ancient port of Syracuse (Siracusa) in the invasion of Sicily, while nine other major ports (Licata, Gela, Pachino, Avola, Noto, Pozzallo, Scoglitti, Ispica and Rosolini) were captured by the Allies on the second day of the invasion.
- The Allied troopships California and Duchess of York of Convoy Faith were bombed in the Atlantic Ocean west of Vigo, Spain by Focke-Wulf Fw 200 Condor aircraft of the Luftwaffe. The bombing killed 27 people on Duchess of York and 19 on California, and both were scuttled the next day after the rescue of survivors.
- The two-day Battle of Enogai between U.S. Marines and Japanese forces in New Georgia ended with a U.S. victory, and Enogai was soon used as an air base.The Japanese lost at least 150 men and the U.S. at least 47.
- The Italian submarine Flutto was sunk with all 49 crew in the Straits of Messina, by three British motor torpedo boats.
- Born: Robert Malval, Prime Minister of Haiti 1993–1994; in Port-au-Prince

== July 12, 1943 (Monday) ==
- In the main engagement of the Battle of Prokhorovka, the German SS Panzer-Regiment 1 and the Soviet 5th Guards Tank Army fought a prolonged tank battle that saw the loss of hundreds of tanks in a single day. As many as 429 German and 616 Soviet tanks battled over the next four days one of the largest tank battles in military history. The Soviets sustained almost 3,600 men killed, wounded or missing in action, while the Germans counted 842 killed and wounded.
- An explosion at Eglin Air Force Base in Florida killed 17 men and injured 51 others.
- The United States Pharmacy Corps was created.
- The Battle of Kolombangara was began in the Solomon Islands off the island of Kolombangara over the night and continued in the next day, ending with a Japanese tactical victory. The Japanese cruiser Jintsū was struck by a torpedo that hit its aft engine room, and the explosion broke the ship in two. Within three minutes, the ship sank, along with 482 of its 505 crew.
- The American destroyer Gwin was sunk with 61 of its crew after a torpedo hit its engine room and would both be sunk.
- The German submarines U-409, U-506 and U-561 were lost to enemy action. U-506, which had sunk 14 merchant ships, was stuck by seven depth charges from a USAAF bomber near Spain and broke in two, and 33 of its 48 crew died immediately, while 15 were able to escape. Before rescue arrived, nine more crew died and only six were saved. and U-409 lost 11 of its 48 crew.
- The Michniów massacre began in occupied Poland. Over a two-day period, German police and SS troopers murdere 204 Poles, including 48 children, in the village of Michniów.
- Born:
  - Christine McVie, British rock keyboardist and singer for Fleetwood Mac); in Bouth, Lancashire (d. 2022)
  - Walter Murch, Academy Award-winning U.S. film editor; in New York City
- Died: Cecilia Loftus, 66, Scottish-born American vaudevillian

== July 13, 1943 (Tuesday) ==
- University of Munich (now LMU Munich) student Alexander Schmorell, 25, and university Professor Karl Huber, 49, were both executed by guillotine at Munich's Stadelheim Prison after being convicted of distributing anti-Nazi literature for the secret organization White Rose. On the same day, trial was held for four other students who were White Rose defendants— Wilhelm Geyer, Manfred Eickemeyer, Josef Soehngen and Harald Dohrn. People's Court chief judge Roland Freisler was absent, and the case was tried before the more lenient Judge Schwingenschlögl. All four were acquitted of the most serious charges and convicted on the less serious crime of failing to report treason. Soehngen received a six-month sentence, with credit for time served, while the other three were ordered to pay court costs.
- The German submarines U-487 and U-607 were lost to a U.S. attack in the Atlantic Ocean. Twenty of the 53 crew of U-487 were killed and 44 of the 51 crew of U-607 died.
- The American League defeated the National League 5-3 in the 11th Major League Baseball All-Star Game at Shibe Park in Philadelphia.
- After drifting nearly 2,000 miles for 47 days in the Pacific Ocean, former Olympic athlete and army officer Louis Zamperini and pilot Russell Phillips reached the Marshall Islands and were captured by Japanese soldiers.

== July 14, 1943 (Wednesday) ==
- Two days after reporting to Soviet Party general secretary Joseph Stalin, General Panteleimon Ponomarenko, the leader of the Belarusian resistance movement, issued Order Number 42, directing the 123 partisan units to begin the destruction of the railway lines that had brought invading German troops in 1941.
- The Battle of Mubo, which had started in New Guinea on April 22, ended after 83 days with an Australian and U.S. victory over Japan's 51st infantry division.
- U.S. soldiers carried out the Biscari massacre, killing 73 unarmed German and Italian prisoners of war (in two separate incidents) in Santo Pietro, near Caltagirone on the island of Sicily. The U.S. Army tried Sergeant Horace T. West for killing 37 prisoners of war with a Thompson submachine gun, and convicted him at his court-martial of premeditated murder. West would serve 14 months of a sentence of life imprisonment and then was restored to active duty and honorably discharged, living until 1994.

Captain John T. Compton was charged with murdering 36 prisoners, but would be acquitted at his court-martial, returning to active duty and being killed in action on November 8, 1943.

- The German submarine U-160, which sank 25 merchant ships, was sunk in the Atlantic Ocean by U.S. aircraft with the loss of all 57 crew.
- The Japanese submarine I-179 sank in the Seto Inland Sea during a diving drill, along with all 85 of its crew, when several hatches were left open.
- The war drama film For Whom the Bell Tolls based on the Ernest Hemingway novel of the same name and starring Gary Cooper and Ingrid Bergman premiered in New York City, and would become the highest grossing and most popular film of 1943.
- Died: Luz Long, 30, German track and field athlete and 1936 Olympic silver medalist, died of wounds suffered while fighting against the Allied invasion of Sicily.

== July 15, 1943 (Thursday) ==
- Renzo Chierici, the Chief of Police for the Italian-occupied area of France, agreed to a demand by the German authorities to turn over all German Jews who had fled across the border.
- The Tule Lake Segregation Center in California was created by order of the U.S. Department of War, renamed from the Tule Lake Relocation Center, one of ten internment camps for U.S. citizens with Japanese ancestry. The "Segregation Center" was selected to house those Japanese-Americans "who by their acts have indicated that their loyalties lie with Japan during the present hostilities". The internees who were classified as disloyal would be transferred to Tule Lake from the other nine camps. Included were any who had formally asked for repatriation to Japan and had not retracted their applications before July 1, 1943; persons who had failed to answer or declined to agree to serve in the U.S. armed forces if called; and any other persons who were, in the opinion of a camp director, not loyal to the United States.
- The German submarines U-135, U-509 and U-759 were lost to U.S. attacks. All 47 crew of U-759 died, and all 54 men on U-509 perished.. With 41 men rescued, however, only five of the 46 crew of U-135 were killed.
- Born:
  - Jocelyn Bell Burnell, U.K. astrophysicist and radio astronomer; in Belfast, Northern Ireland
  - The Diligenti quintuplets (Franco, Carlos Alberto, Maria Ester, Maria Fernanda and Maria Cristina); in Buenos Aires, Argentina. They were the second group of quintuplets to all survive childbirth, the Dionne quintuplets having been the first, in 1934. In 2013, all five celebrated their 70th birthday together in Argentina.

== July 16, 1943 (Friday) ==
- The Norwegian freighter D/S Bjørkhaug, which was hauling 1,800 German mines that had been collected by minesweepers, exploded in the harbor at Algiers, killing hundreds of people who were working on the docks.
- Allied aircraft dropped pamphlets over the Italian mainland with the message, "Die for Mussolini and Hitler, or live for Italy and for civilization", a message reinforced by Allied radio broadcasts. On the same day, Benito Mussolini, under pressure from other members of the Fascist Party to respond to the invasion of Italy, convened the Fascist Grand Council for the first time since 1939.
- The Air Ministry of the United Kingdom gave approval for the use of the aluminum strips referred to as "Window", as a countermeasure against German radar.
- Nazi officials in German-occupied France ordered a roundup of the 13,000 Jews living in Paris, including 4,000 children, to be arrested and deported to the detention center at Drancy, from which they were transported to the Auschwitz extermination camp.
- Lithuanian Jewish resistance leader Yitzhak Wittenberg voluntarily surrendered himself to the Gestapo in Vilnius in return for an agreement that the Jewish ghetto there would not be liquidated. Wittenberg died soon afterward, either being murdered or killing himself.
- Father Marie-Benoit, a French Roman Catholic priest, met with Pope Pius XII in hopes of getting Vatican support for the transfer of 30,000 French Jews, from the Italian occupation zone at Nice, to Italy, before the area was turned over to German administration. Benoit was unsuccessful in persuading the Pope to act.
- The German Office of High Frequency Research was created, with Dr. Hans Plendl as the director.
- The Battle of Mount Tambu began in New Guinea with Australian and American infantry arriving at Salamaua on the Japanese-held island, and would last until August 18.
- The German submarine U-67 was depth charged and sunk in the Atlantic Ocean by U.S. aircraft based on the escort carrier Core. While three survivors were rescued by USS McCormick, the other 48 of the 51 crew were killed.
- The Batman brought the comic book superheroes Batman and Robin to film for the first time, in a 15-installment serial that would precede the feature presentation of films from the Columbia Pictures studio. Lewis Wilson, 23, appeared as Batman and Bruce Wayne, while Douglas Croft, 17, portrayed Robin and Dick Grayson.
- Born:
  - Jimmy Johnson, American football coach who guided the Dallas Cowboys to two Super Bowl wins; in Port Arthur, Texas
  - Reinaldo Arenas, Cuban-born novelist, poet and dissident; in Aguas Claras (d. 1990)
- Died:
  - Saul Raphael Landau, 73, Polish Jewish lawyer, journalist, publicist and Zionist activist (b. 1870)

== July 17, 1943 (Saturday) ==
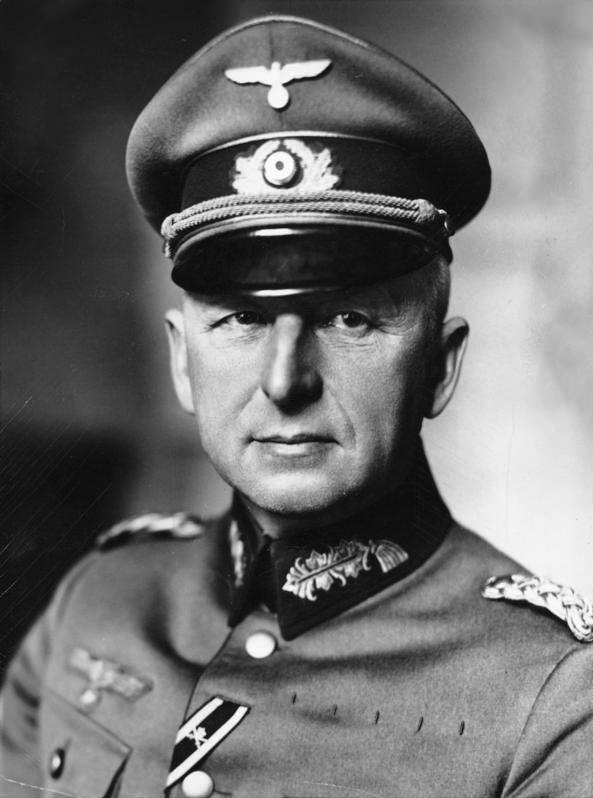
General von Manstein

- As the tank battle continued in Kursk, German panzer commanders were ordered by Adolf Hitler to withdraw from the battlefield and bring Operation Citadel to an end, despite protests by Erich von Manstein and other German generals that the Soviet forces could be defeated. At the time that the operation ceased, Germany had lost 252 tanks, compared to more than 2,000 lost by the Soviet Union. The battle had 64,000 German casualties, and 320,000 of the Soviet troops.
- The Krasowo-Częstki massacre took place in the village of Krasowo-Częstki in Nazi-occupied Poland was completely burned and 257 of its inhabitants, mostly women and children, murdered by the Ordnungspolizei and SS. The killing was made in retaliation for the deaths of at least eight Germans in a skirmish with Polish partisans nearby.
- The Allied Drive on Munda Point concluded after 15 days of fighting the Japanese on New Georgia, with limited tactical gains, and 90 U.S. and New Zealand troops killed. Historian Samuel Eliot Morison would right later that the choice of Zanana as a landing site and then to separate the U.S. regiments " was perhaps the worst blunder in the most unintelligently waged land campaign of the Pacific war (with the possible exception of Okinawa)." The Japanese forces then launched the New Georgia counterattack, which the Allied troops defeated the next day.
- The Japanese destroyer Hatsuyuki' was bombed and sunk in an American air raid at Kahili, Shortland Islands. The ship had been carrying civilian travelers and Japanese troops, and the passengers had been going ashore at Shortlands when a bomb triggered an explosion of the artillery magazine and the ship sank, killing 120 people (38 civilians and 82 military).

== July 18, 1943 (Sunday) ==
- General Harold Alexander of the British Army became the first Allied Military Governor of Sicily, as conquest of the Italian island was nearly completed. His first act was to proclaim the dissolution of all Fascist organizations.
- In the only battle during World War II between an airship and a submarine, the U.S. Army blimp K-74 dropped depth charges on the German U-boat U-134, which fired its 20 mm cannons at the blimp. The K-74 was downed and its crew of ten were rescued unharmed the next day, and nobody was hurt on the U-134
- The New Georgia counterattack ended in Japanese offensive failure.
- Born: Calvin Peete, African-American professional golfer and 1984 Vardon Trophy winner; in Detroit (d. 2015)

== July 19, 1943 (Monday) ==
- Italian dictator Benito Mussolini met with Germany's Adolf Hitler at the northern Italian town of Feltre to discuss Italy's withdrawal from further fighting, but Mussolini reportedly failed to bring the subject up. The two leaders agreed to mount a fighting withdrawal in Italy while the Gustav Line was formed across the 72 miles from the mouth of the Garigliano to the River Sangro south of Ortona.
- At 11:13 in the morning, Allied airplanes dropped bombs on the ancient city of Rome, three days after the ultimatum had been made to Italy. Italian state radio reported that 166 people were killed and 1,659 injured. The attack, and the prospect of the conquest and destruction of Italy, would hasten the fall of Premier Mussolini.
- The United States Department of War issued an order requiring that the most troublesome German prisoners of war — "Nazi leaders, Gestapo agents, and extremists" — were to be interned at the Camp Alva PW camp at Alva, Oklahoma.
- The Warsaw concentration camp, referred to as KL (Konzentrationslager) Warschau was opened with barbed wire surrounding the ruins of the former Warsaw Ghetto, with a few hundred Polish prisoners and foreign Jews being put to work in destroying the remaining buildings, salvaging valuable property that may have been left in the ruins, and attempting to persuade Warsaw's remaining Jews to come out of hiding.
- The German submarine U-513 was depth charged and sunk in the South Atlantic by Martin PBM Mariner aircraft of the U.S. Navy, with the loss of 46 of the submarine's 53 crew.
- Born: Han Sai Por, Singaporean sculptor; in Singapore
- Died: Yekaterina Budanova, 26, Soviet Air Force flying ace who shot down 20 German aircraft, was killed after her Yakovlev UT-1 plane was hit in aerial combat. She and fellow-Soviet Lydia Litvyak were the only two women to be recognized as "aces" for having shot down more than five aircraft.

== July 20, 1943 (Tuesday) ==
- The U.S. Joint Chiefs of Staff voted to fight Japan by invading the Gilbert Islands and Nauru first, followed by a battle for the Marshall Islands.
- The Battle of Bairoko was fought between U.S. and Japanese forces on New Georgia. The day-long American assault on Japanese defensive positions was unsuccessful as 50 Americans and more than 33 Japanese were killed.
- The Japanese destroyers Kiyonami, with 241 men, and Yūgure, with 228 men, were bombed and sunk northwest of Kolombangara by U.S. aircraft. While 60 men were able to evacuate the Kiyonami, only one survived. The entire crew of Yūgure perished.
- The German submarine U-558 was sunk in the Bay of Biscay by Allied aircraft, with the loss of 41 of its 47 crew.
- Born:
  - Wendy Richard, British TV actress (Are You Being Served? and EastEnders); in Middlesbrough (d. 2009).
  - John Lodge, bass guitarist, singer and songwriter for The Moody Blues; in Erdington, Birmingham, England (d. 2025).
- Died: Walter Schilling, 47, German lieutenant general who had received the Iron Cross four times, the German Cross and the Cross of Honor for his heroism in World War One and World War Two, was killed in action in Ukraine.

== July 21, 1943 (Wednesday) ==
- German occupation authorities in Yugoslavia announced a bounty of 100,000 Reichsmarks for the capture of Josip Broz Tito, and the same amount for Tito's fellow resistance leader, Draža Mihailović.
- The Battle of Roosevelt Ridge began between U.S. and Japanese forces in the Salamaua region of the Territory of New Guinea, and would last for 24 days before U.S. and Australian forces could take the ridge on August 14.
- The German submarine U-662 was depth charged and sunk in the Amazon Estuary by an American Consolidated PBY Catalina, with all but three of the crew of more than 44 being killed.
- Born:
  - Tess Gallagher, American poet; in Port Angeles, Washington
  - Edward Herrmann, American film and TV actor; in Washington, D.C. (d. 2014)
- Died: Charley Paddock, 42, American track and field athlete, winner of two gold medals in 1920 Olympics, U.S. Army Major General William P. Upshur, 61, Medal of Honor recipient, and four others, were killed when their plane crashed during an inspection tour in Alaska.

== July 22, 1943 (Thursday) ==
- The Japanese seaplane tender Nisshin was bombed and sunk by American aircraft off the southeast tip of Bougainville Island, with the loss of 1,015 of the troops on board, and only 178 survivors, who were rescued by the Japanese escort ships.
- George S. Patton's Seventh United States Army entered Palermo.
- The remaining 2,500 Jewish prisoners at the Tarnopol concentration camp were executed by the German SS.

== July 23, 1943 (Friday) ==
- The Battle of Belgorod began on the Eastern Front.
- On recommendation of the National Petroleum Council, Brazil banned the use of private motorcycles throughout the nation in order to conserve fuel. Use of gasoline-powered automobiles had been prohibited the year before.
- The British cruiser Newfoundland was torpedoed and damaged in the Mediterranean Sea by the Italian submarine Ascianghi, which was then depth charged and sunk (with the loss of 23 of its 50 men) y the British destroyers Eclipse and Laforey.
- The German submarine U-527 was sunk by a U.S. Avenger aircraft, killing 40 of its 53 crew when the pressure hull was blown open.. The submarines, U-598 (with 43 of its 45 crew) and U-613 (with its crew of at least 44) were lost to enemy action in the Atlantic Ocean.

== July 24, 1943 (Saturday) ==
- Operation Gomorrah, the destruction of the German port of Hamburg began. British and Canadian airplanes bombed the city by night, and American planes followed during the day. By the end of the operation in November, 9,000 tons of explosives would kill more than 30,000 people and destroy 280,000 buildings. For the first time, the British forces used "Window", aluminum strips dropped to distort radar images, against the German anti-aircraft defense.
- The Fascist Grand Council began its first meeting since 1939. In a ten-hour session that lasted into the next morning, the Council criticized Prime Minister Mussolini for his failure to prevent Italy from being invaded. At the end of the meeting, on a motion by Dino Grandi the Council voted 19 to 7 to remove Mussolini from further leadership.
- The German submarines U-459 and U-622 were lost to enemy action. On U-459, 18 of the 59 crew went down with the ship, including the commander, who was seen at the conning tower saluting the 41 survivors, who were taken prisoner. U-459 went down with its entire crew of at least 44.

== July 25, 1943 (Sunday) ==
- Benito Mussolini resigned as Prime Minister of Italy, along with the other Fascist Party members of his cabinet, bringing an end to a dictatorship of more than 17 years. After leaving the meeting of the Fascist Grand Council earlier that day, Mussolini reportedly left to award prizes in a farmer's festival to conduct business as usual. Count Grandi then reported the Fascist Council decision to King Victor Emmanuel III, who ordered Mussolini to report personally, and then asked the longtime Premier to resign. When Mussolini asked for more time and left the palace, he was arrested, then driven away to face imprisonment. Marshal Pietro Badoglio was appointed by King Victor Emmanuel III as the new Italian premier.
- The USS Harmon, the first U.S. Navy ship to be named after an African-American person, was launched. The ship was named for Leonard Roy Harmon, a mess attendant who had been killed in Guadalcanal while saving a shipmate.
- Ubaldo Pugnaloni won the Giro d'Italia, the national cycling championship of Italy, on the day that the Fascist government was overthrown.

== July 26, 1943 (Monday) ==
- American-born poet Ezra Pound was indicted for treason for making radio broadcasts from Italy for the Axis powers; indicted also were Robert H. Best, Fred W. Kaltenbach, Douglas Chandler ("Paul Revere"), Edward Leo Delaney (E.D. Ward), Constance Drexel, Jane Anderson, and Max Otto Koischwitz ("O.K."). U. S. Attorney General Francis Biddle said that any of the eight, all indicted in absentia, would be brought to trial when caught.
- An assassination attempt was made on Mohammed Ali Jinnah, the future leader of Pakistan. Jinnah was in his home in Bombay (Mumbai) when a young man attacked him with a knife, but he escaped major wounds.
- The German submarine U-359 was depth charged and sunk with all 47 of its crew off the southwest tip of Haiti by an American Martin PBM Mariner aircraft.
- Born: Mick Jagger, English rock singer and founder of The Rolling Stones; as Michael Philip Jagger in Dartford, Kent

== July 27, 1943 (Tuesday) ==
- Major Joseph Duckworth and his navigator, Lieutenant Ralph O'Hair, both of the United States Army, became the first persons to deliberately fly an airplane into the eye of a hurricane. Duckworth piloted an AT-6 airplane to gather data on the storm near Houston, although according to a 1955 book by Ivan Tannehill, The Hurricane Hunters, "several of Duckworth's instructors had flown in into the same storm in B-25s, but were afraid of their boss." Storm warnings were not given for what would be called the "Surprise Hurricane", because of censorship during World War II. Although its winds had declined to what is now called a tropical storm, 19 people were killed and there was 17 million dollars of damage (equivalent to $225,000,000 in 2013). "After the loss of life in this storm", meteorologist Bryan Norcross would write later, weather information has never been censored again."
- Prince Aimone, Duke of Aosta, a member of the royal family of Italy who had been named by Benito Mussolini as King Tomislav II of the "Independent State of Croatia", renounced his rights to the throne without ever having set foot in his kingdom. When he was the Duke of Spoleto, Aimone was selected as the figurehead monarch of the puppet state, which had been set up in Axis-occupied Yugoslavia. Ante Pavelić, who ruled Croatia as its Prime Minister, accepted the King's abdication and then turned the state into a republic.
- Government broadcasts from Rome announced that Marshal Badoglio and his new cabinet had ordered the dissolution of the Fascist Council, and that the Fascist Party would be abolished.
- The Japanese submarine I-168 was torpedoed and sunk with all 97 crew in the Steffen Strait by the American submarine Scamp.

== July 28, 1943 (Wednesday) ==
- In the greatest single-day loss of life in wartime, up to then, more than 30,000 residents of the German port city of Hamburg were killed when British bombers carried out Operation Gomorrha during the night of July 27 and 28th. Because of unusually dry conditions, the high combustibility of buildings in the working class neighborhoods of Billwärder-Ausschlag, Borgfelde and Hamm, and the use of more than 1,000 tons of incendiary bombs, a firestorm was created, bringing powerful winds to spread the destruction. Most of the victims died from carbon monoxide poisoning inside basement shelters, and it took two days for the streets to cool down enough for rescue teams to look for survivors. "At the heart of the apocalyptic fire", author Frederick Taylor would write later, "there were no survivors found, none at all."
- IKEA, now the world's largest retailer of furniture, was founded in Sweden by a 17-year old carpenter, Ingvar Kamprad, with the concept of selling items at a lower price, for the purchaser to assemble. Kamprad coined the name from his initials, and his address of the Eimtaryd farm near the village of Älmtaryd.
- American Airlines Flight 63, from Louisville to Nashville, crashed near the town of Trammell, Kentucky, killing all 20 people on board.
- U.S. Army General Dwight D. Eisenhower, the Supreme Commander of Allied Forces, made a radio broadcast to Italy, urging the Italian people to follow up the overthrow of Mussolini by withdrawing from the Axis powers. "You can have peace immediately, and peace under the honorable conditions which our governments have already offered you," said Eisenhower. "We are coming to you as liberators ... As you have already seen in Sicily, our occupation will be mild and beneficient ... The ancient liberties and traditions of your country will be restored."
- President Roosevelt gave a fireside chat on the fall of Mussolini. Roosevelt vowed that the fallen dictator "and his Fascist gang will be brought to book, and punished for their crimes against humanity. No criminal will be allowed to escape by the expedient of 'resignation.' So our terms to Italy are still the same as our terms to Germany and Japan --'unconditional surrender.'"
- At the Old Bailey in London, Communist Party member Douglas Springhall was sentenced to seven years in prison for obtaining information about munitions "calculated to be useful to the enemy." Justice Oliver told Springhall, "I do not think, on your record, it is likely that your purpose was to communicate these things to Germany, but to communicate them to someone I have no doubt whatever."
- The Japanese destroyers Ariake and Mikazuki were bombed and sunk off Cape Gloucester, New Guinea by American B-25 Mitchell aircraft.
- The German submarines U-159 (with all 53 crew) and U-404 (with its entire crew of more than 44) were lost to Allied attacks.
- Born:
  - Bill Bradley, American basketball player and politician who served as U.S. Senator for New Jersey from 1979 to 1997 after playing at forward for the New York Knicks from 1967 to 1977, later inducted into the Basketball Hall of Fame; in Crystal City, Missouri
  - Richard Wright, British musician and co-founder of Pink Floyd as its keyboardist; in Harrow, London (d. 2008)
  - Mike Bloomfield, American composer and blues guitarist for the Paul Butterfield Blues Band, ranked by Rolling Stone as one of the "100 greatest guitarists of all time"; in Chicago (died of overdose, 1981)Ward, Ed (1983). Michael Bloomfield: The rise and fall of an American guitar hero. Cherry Lane Books. ISBN 978-0-89524-157-3.

== July 29, 1943 (Thursday) ==
- The Alaskan island of Kiska was evacuated by the remaining 5,183 Japanese officers, enlisted men and civilians who had occupied the American territory. U.S. ships had been diverted away from the island between July 23rd and 26th, when American radar detected what appeared to be a convoy of seven reinforcement ships. With the U.S. warships away from Kiska, the Japanese escaped to their own rescue ships within 55 minutes. When Allied troops arrived on August 15, they were surprised to find that the island was deserted.
- The British government announced that women under the age of 50 must register for war work.
- The Italian submarine Pietro Micca was sunk (with the loss of 54 of its 72 crew) at the entrance to the Adriatic Sea by the British submarine Trooper.
- The German submarine U-614 was depth charged and sunk northwest of Cape Finisterre by a Vickers Wellington of No. 172 Squadron RAF, with the loss of its entire crew of at least 44 men.

== July 30, 1943 (Friday) ==
- The world's first jet-powered bomber airplane, the German Arado Ar 234, made its first flight.
- France renounced the concession that it had held to Chinese territory in Shanghai since 1849.
- Igor Kurchatov, the Soviet physicist assigned to developing the first nuclear bomb for the U.S.S.R., reported to Deputy Premier Vyacheslav Molotov that the program had advanced significantly from secrets gathered in espionage against the United States.
- Six German submarines— U-43 and all 53 crew, U-375, U-461, U-462, U-504 (with all 53 crew) and U-591) were all lost to enemy action on the same day. On U-521, 28 of the 47 crew survived a depth-charging. U-461 lost 50 of its 65 crew, but the Australian RAAF flying boat that sank it dropped an inflatable dinghy, saving 15 of the men. U-375 disappeared with its crew of at least 44 men
- Died: Marie-Louise Giraud, 39, a French housewife who had been convicted of carrying out 27 abortions, became the last woman in France to be executed by guillotine, with her sentence carried out by the Nazi occupation government.

== July 31, 1943 (Saturday) ==
- The Brazilian passenger ship and freighter Bagé, largest commercial ship in Brazil's fleet, was torpedoed and sunk off the coast of the Sergipe state, with the loss of 41 passengers and 37 crew out of the 231 people on board. The Bagé, was en route from Belém to Rio de Janeiro when it was struck by a German U-boat.
- The Battle of the Ruhr, the Allied strategic bombing campaign against Germany that had begun on March 5, came to an end with the destruction or damage of most of the heavy industry factories in Germany's Ruhr Valley. In the campaign, 675 Allied aircraft were shot down. More than 21,000 German civilians and military, and over 5,000 Allied troops, were killed.
- The Battle of Troina began between Allied invaders and Axis defenders as part of the Allied invasion of Sicily, and would last until August 6.
- General Henri Giraud was designated as commander-in-chief of the French Resistance forces, as the new National Committee of Liberation held its first meeting, establishing a government in French Algeria. General Charles de Gaulle was named as President of the Committee.
- The German submarine U-199 was depth charged and sunk in the South Atlantic with the loss of 49 of its 61 crew, though 12 were rescued after a Brazilian Air Force plane dropped a life raft.
- "You'll Never Know" by Dick Haymes hit #1 on the Billboard singles chart.
- Born: William Bennett, American politician, conservative pundit and political theorist; in Brooklyn, New York City
