= Yugoslav submarine Sava =

Submarine of the Royal Navy

History

Kingdom of Italy
- Name: Nautilo
- Builder: Cantieri Riuniti dell'Adriatico (CRDA), Monfalcone, Kingdom of Italy
- Laid down: 3 January 1942
- Launched: 20 March 1943
- Completed: 26 July 1943
- Fate: Scuttled in September 1943

History

Nazi Germany
- Name: UIT-19
- Acquired: 1943
- Fate: Sunk 9 January 1944

History

SFR Yugoslavia
- Name: Sava
- Commissioned: 1949
- Identification: P-802
- Fate: Stricken in 1971

General characteristics (as completed in 1943)
- Displacement: Surfaced: 905 tonnes (891 long tons); Submerged: 1,068 tonnes (1,051 long tons)
- Length: 63.15 m (207.2 ft) (o/a)
- Beam: 6.98 m (22.9 ft)
- Draft: 4.87 m (16.0 ft)
- Propulsion: 2 × diesel engines; 2,400 hp (1,800 kW); 2 × electric motors; 800 hp (600 kW)
- Speed: Surfaced: 16 kn (30 km/h; 18 mph); Submerged: 8.5 kn (15.7 km/h; 9.8 mph)
- Crew: 48–53
- Armament: 6 × 533 mm (21.0 in) torpedo tubes; 1 × 100 mm (4 in) / 47 caliber deck gun; 4 × 20 mm (0.79 in) or 13.2 mm (0.52 in)

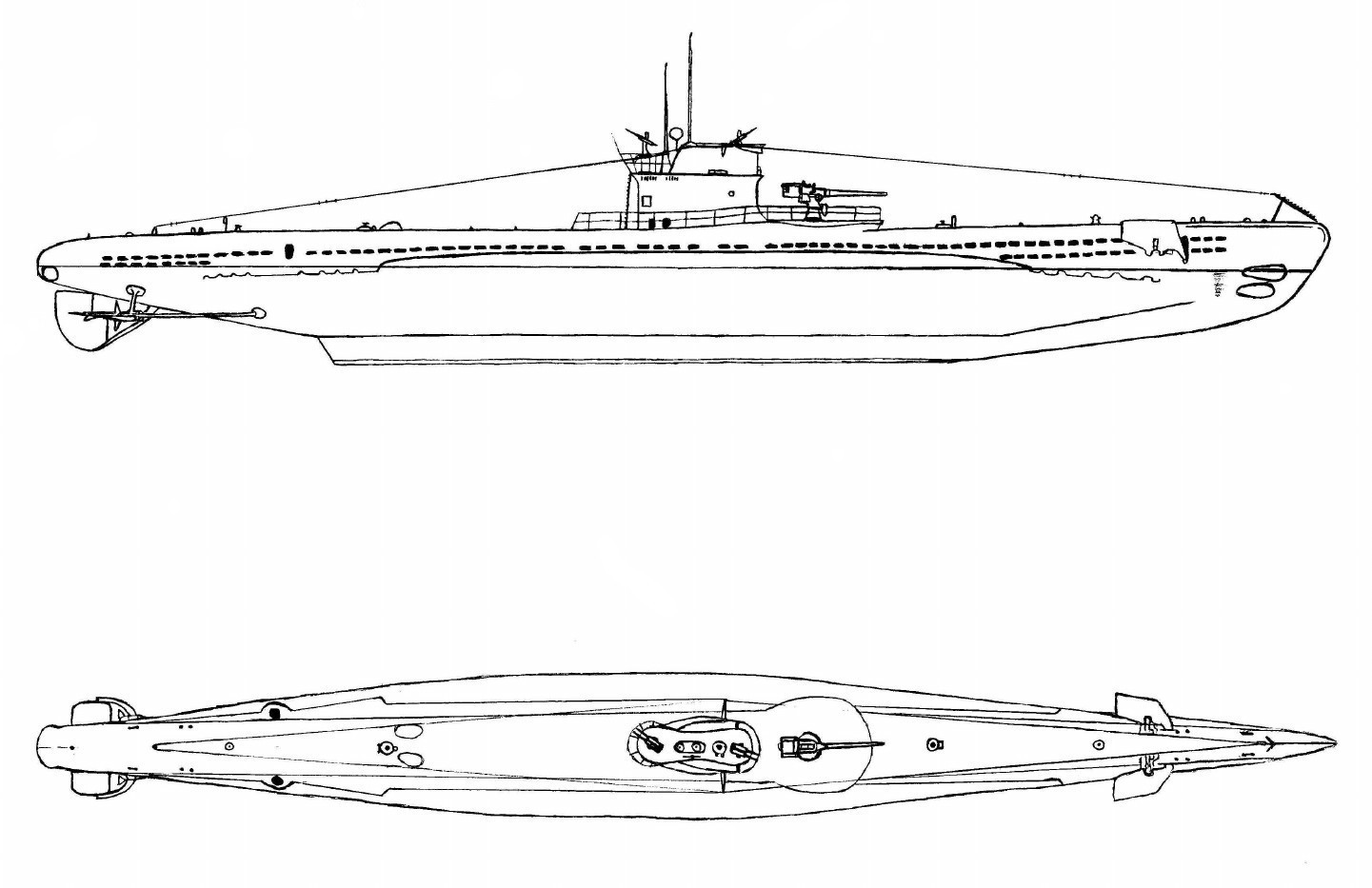
Profile drawing of a Flutto-class submarine, the same class as the Yugoslav submarine Sava

Sava (pennant number P-802) was a Flutto-class submarine in service with the Yugoslav Navy (Serbo-Croatian: Jugoslavenska ratna mornarica – JRM). Built by Cantieri Riuniti dell'Adriatico in Monfalcone during the Second World War, Sava was laid down and completed as Nautilo for service with the Italian Regia Marina (Royal Navy).

The boat was scuttled by her crew in September 1943 following the Italian armistice. She was salvaged by German forces and commissioned in the Kriegsmarine as UIT-19, only to be sunk again in an Allied air raid in 1944. After the war, the Yugoslav Navy salvaged her for the second time, commissioning her as Sava and operating her until 1971.

== Design and construction ==
Sava was laid down on 3 January 1942 as Nautilo, the eighth boat of the Type 1 Flutto-class submarines that were being built for the Regia Marina (Royal Navy) by Cantieri Riuniti dell'Adriatico, Monfalcone. The boat was launched on 20 March 1943 and completed by 26 July the same year.

As completed, the boat measured 63.15 m (207 ft 2 in) in length overall, with a 6.98 m (22 ft 11 in) beam and a draught of 4.87 m (16 ft 0 in). The boat displaced 905 tonnes (891 long tons) when surfaced and 1,068 tonnes (1,051 long tons) when submerged. Propulsion consisted of two Fiat diesel engines rated at 2,400 hp (1,800 kW) and two CRDA electric motors of a total 800 hp (600 kW), giving the boat a surface speed of 16 kn (30 km/h; 18 mph) and an underwater speed of 8.5 knots (15.7 km/h; 9.8 mph).

Main armament consisted of six 21 in (530 mm) torpedo tubes with a complement of 12 torpedoes. Other weapons included a single 3.9 in (99 mm)/47 gun, four 20 mm (0.79 in)/70 guns and/or four 13.2 mm (0.52 in). The boat's crew consisted of four to five officers and 44 to 48 seamen.

== Service history ==
Following the Italian armistice in September 1943, Nautilo was scuttled in Venice harbour. The boat was then refloated by German forces and commissioned in the Kriegsmarine as UIT-19. The boat was once again sunk on 9 January 1944 in Pula, during an air raid carried out by the Royal Air Force. After the end of the war, the boat was raised by the Yugoslav Navy (Serbo-Croatian: Jugoslavenska ratna mornarica – JRM) and moved to the Uljanik Shipyard where she underwent repairs which lasted from 1947 to 1949. The boat was commissioned in 1949 as Sava (pennant number P-802), and with the Mališan (P-901) and Tara (P-801), formed the basis of the new Yugoslav submarine fleet.

In 1958 the boat was relegated to training duties, followed by a major refit which lasted from 1958 to 1960. The refit involved removing her 100 mm deck gun and reconstruction of the conning tower in order to make it more streamlined. She continued serving as a training vessel until she was stricken in 1971. She became a night club in the Croatian town of Dubrovnik called "Yellow submarine".

== See also ==
- List of ships of the Yugoslav Navy
