= June 1943 =

Month of 1943

| << | June 1943 | | | | | >> |
| Su | Mo | Tu | We | Th | Fr | Sa |
| | | 1 | 2 | 3 | 4 | 5 |
| 6 | 7 | 8 | 9 | 10 | 11 | 12 |
| 13 | 14 | 15 | 16 | 17 | 18 | 19 |
| 20 | 21 | 22 | 23 | 24 | 25 | 26 |
| 27 | 28 | 29 | 30 |

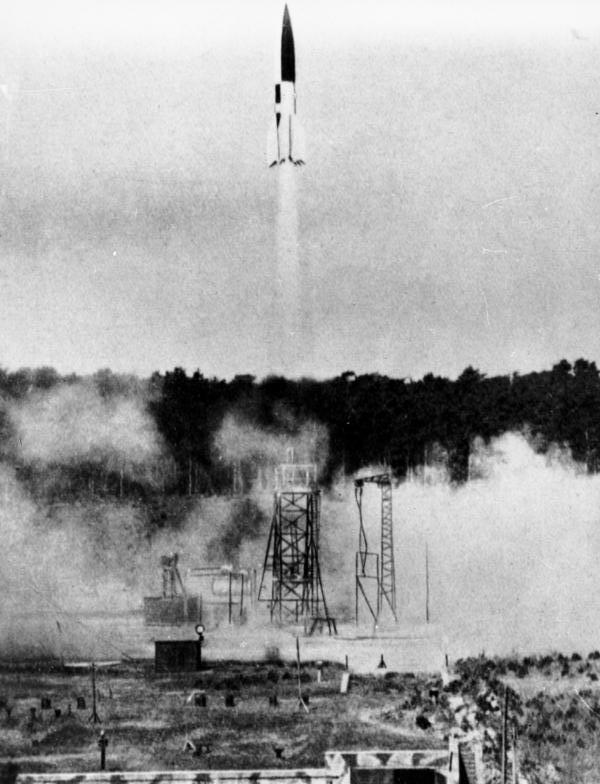
June 28, 1943: Germany successfully tests the new V-2 ballistic missile

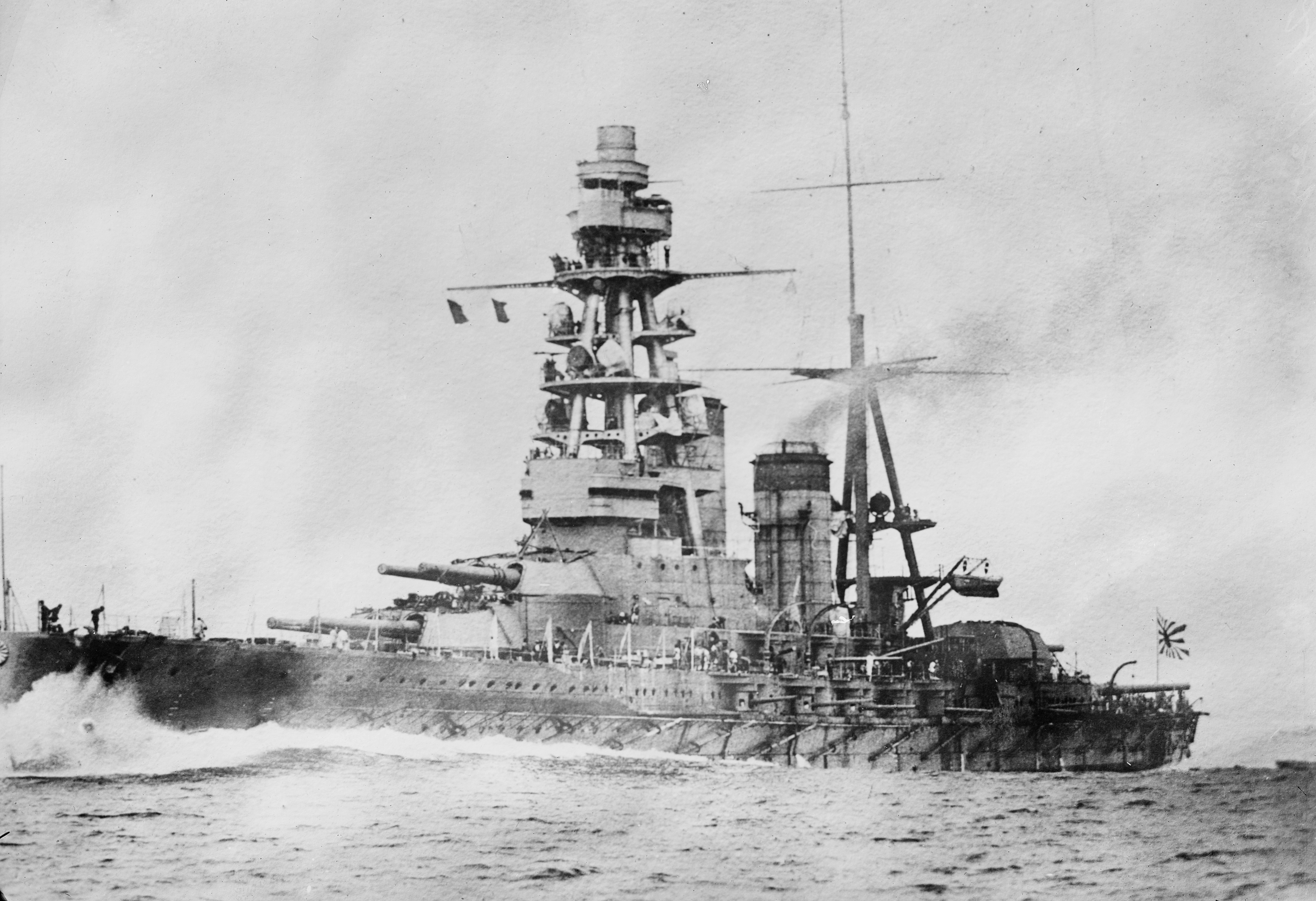
June 8, 1943: Explosion of ammunition on Japanese battleship Mutsu kills 1,121 crew

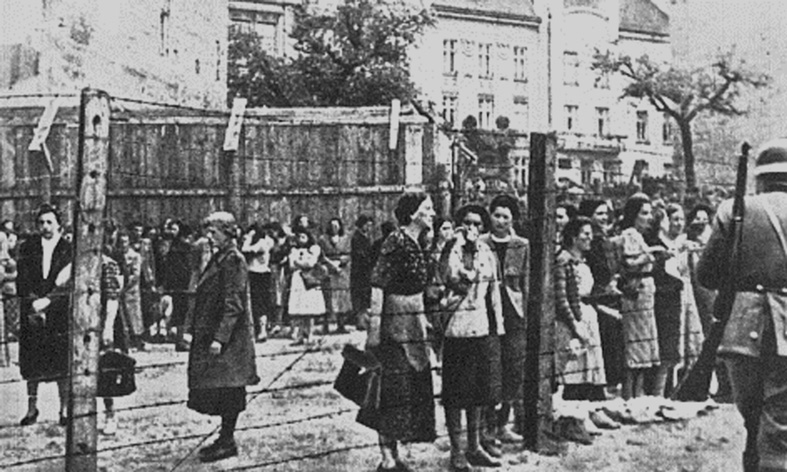
June 2, 1943: Removal of Polish Jews from the Lwow Ghetto is completed

The following events occurred in June 1943:

== June 1, 1943 (Tuesday) ==
- An explosion caused by a collision that killed 65 of the 68 men on the American liberty ship SS John Morgan, and 18 of the 82 crew on the tanker SS Montana. SS John Morgan was sailing out of the Baltimore harbor on its maiden voyage, and carrying a cargo of explosives, while SS Montana was entering the harbor. All but three crew on John Morgan were killed instantly in the blast, while the Morgan caught fire and 18 of its crew were burned to death in the subsequent blaze. The U.S. Navy waited five days before releasing the news.

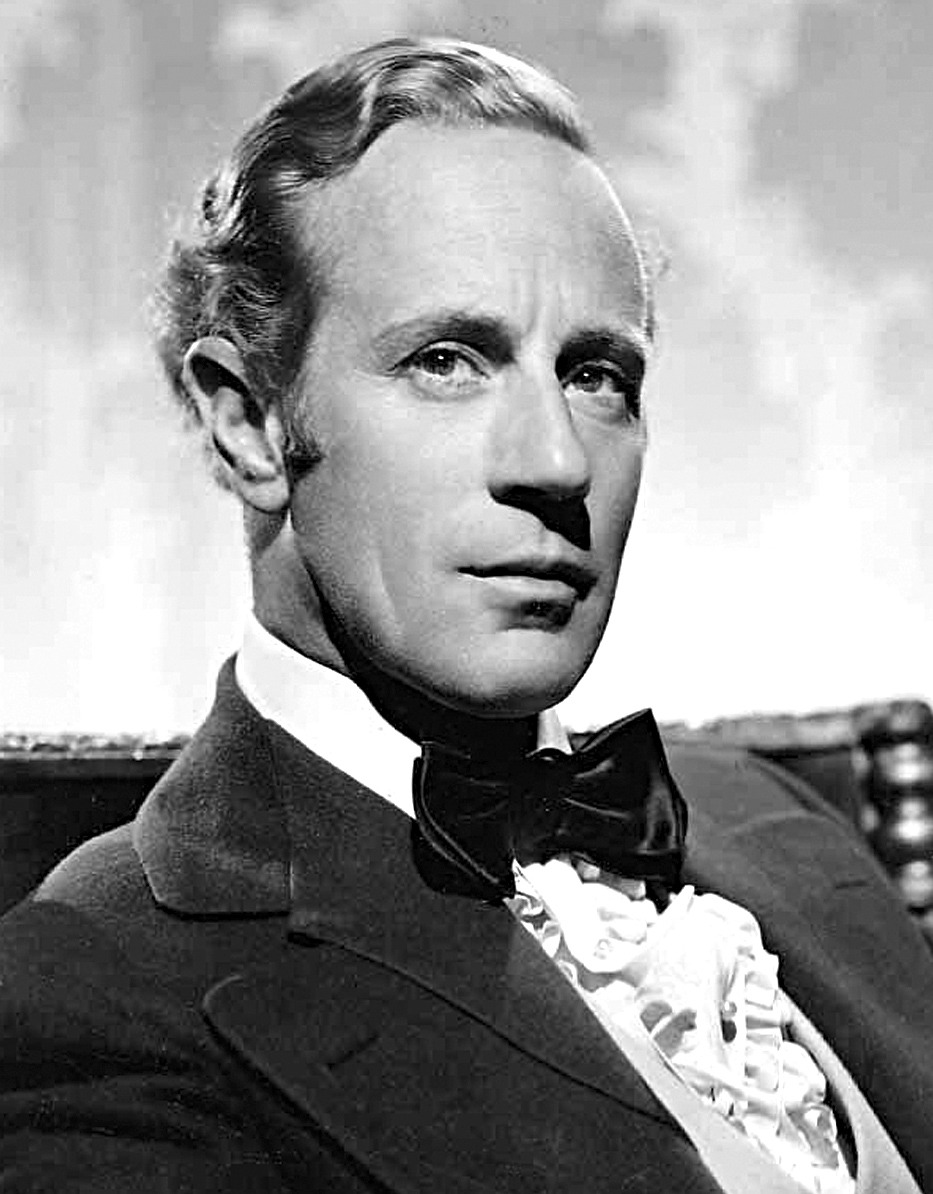
Leslie Howard, as Ashley Wilkes in Gone With the Wind

- The Soviet Navy gunboat KL-12 was sunk by German aircraft while off of the coast of Vailisin Island, killing 27 of the 49 people aboard.
- All 17 persons aboard British Overseas Airways Corporation Flight 777 where killed, including film actor Leslie Howard, who had starred as Ashley Wilkes in Gone with the Wind. The DC-3 airplane was on a scheduled passenger flight, when it was shot down over the Bay of Biscay during an encounter with eight German Junkers Ju 88s. There was speculation that the downing was an attempt to kill British Prime Minister Winston Churchill and that the Germans may have mistakenly believed that he was aboard.
- When the truce called by the UMWA in the coal mine strike expired at 12:01 am, union miners walked off of their jobs for the second time in five weeks. John L. Lewis ordered the men to return to work at the end of the week.
- Born: Kuki Gallmann, Italian author who wrote of her experiences in Kenya, including her book I Dreamed of Africa; in Treviso

== June 2, 1943 (Wednesday) ==
- Liquidation of the Lwów Ghetto, located in German-occupied Poland, was completed, with the last surviving Jewish residents deported to the nearby Janowska concentration camp. At one time, there had been 160,000 Jews in Lwów which the Germans had renamed Lemberg. Nearly all of the former dwellers would be killed by November. After the Soviet victory in World War II, the city would become part of the Ukrainian SSR and renamed Lvov.
- The Italian Navy torpedo boat Castore was shelled and sunk in the Mediterranean Sea near Cape Spartivento off of the coast of Sardinia by the British ship HMS Jervis and the Greek destroyer Vasilissa Olga, with the loss of at least 82 of its crew of 152.
- The German submarines U-105 (with all 53 crew), U-202 (with 18 of its 48 crew) and U-521 (with 50 of its 51 crew) were lost to enemy action in the Atlantic Ocean. U-105 had sunk 23 merchant ships in almost 30 months of action. Klaus Bargsten, the commander of U-521, was the sole survivor after giving the order to flood the vessel and abandon ship.
- The comedy film Hit the Ice, starring, Abbott and Costello was released.
- Born:
  - Ilaiyaraaja, Indian classical musician and film score composer; as Raja Gnanadhesikan in Pannaipuram, Madras Presidency, British India
  - Blinky Palermo (artistic name of Peter Schwarze), German abstract artist; in Leipzig (died 1977)
- Died:
  - Nile Kinnick, 24, winner of college football's Heisman Trophy in 1939 at the University of Iowa. Kinnick, who had passed up on an NFL career, disappeared when his F4F Wildcat fighter plane crashed during a training mission. He ditched in the ocean off of the coast of Venezuela when his plane began leaking oil while he was returning to the aircraft carrier USS Lexington.
  - John Frank Stevens, 90, American engineer, chief engineer on the Panama Canal
  - Dr. Allan Roy Dafoe, 60, Canadian physician to the Dionne quintuplets

== June 3, 1943 (Thursday) ==
- The "Zoot Suit Riots" began when 11 U.S. servicemen, on shore leave in Los Angeles, got into a fight with a group of Mexican-American youths. The next day, about 200 servicemen, mostly U.S. Navy sailors, rode in taxis to the Hispanic neighborhoods in East L.A. and began attacking non-white residents; by June 7, thousands of civilians were involved in the fighting. The U.S. Navy and U.S. Army barred military personnel from venturing into downtown L.A., ending the riots.
- The French Committee of National Liberation (Comité Français de Libération Nationale, CFLN) was formed with headquarters in Algiers and Generals Charles de Gaulle and Henri Giraud as co-presidents.
- The Battle of West Hubei in China ended after more than five weeks. China claimed that it 14,723 of its soldiers had been killed and that 25,000 from Japan had been killed or wounded, while Japan claimed that 30,766 Chinese and 771 Japanese had been killed.
- Inventor Robert Hurley filed a patent application for the pocket protector, designed for carrying ink pens in shirt pockets. Hurley would be awarded U.S. Patent No. 2,417,786 on March 18, 1947, for his "Pocket Shield or Protector".
- The Hot Springs Conference on Food and Agriculture in Hot Springs, Virginia, attended by representatives of 10 nations, all part of the Allies, came to an end after having convened on May 18.

== June 4, 1943 (Friday) ==
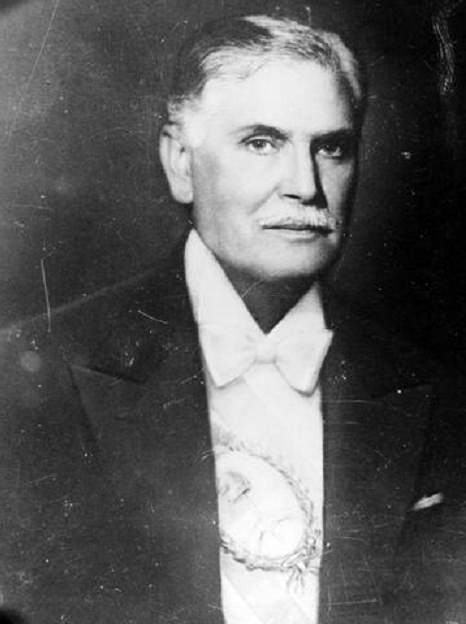
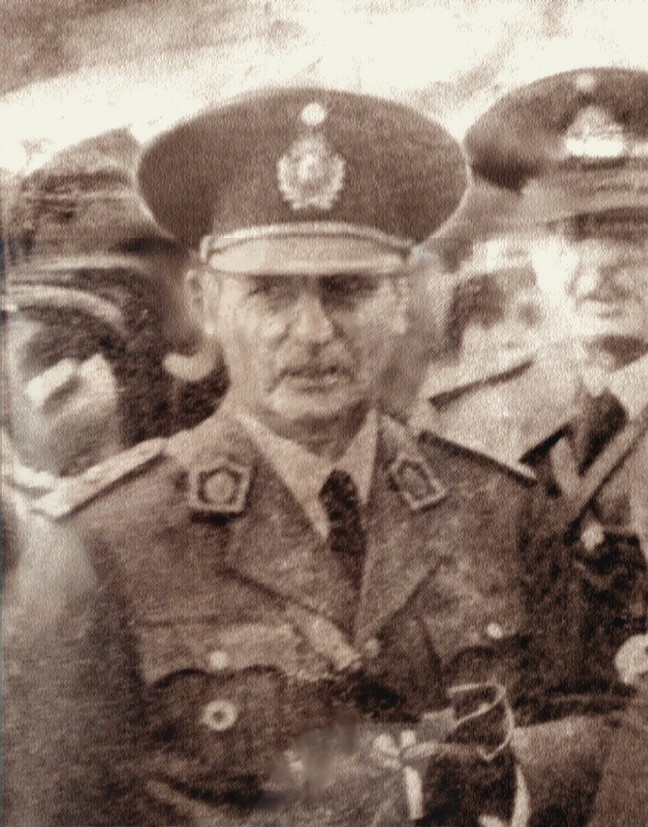
President Castillo and General Rawson
- A coup d'état in Argentina ousted President Ramón Castillo, who had insisted on strict neutrality during World War II and continued to maintain diplomatic relations with the Axis powers. Castillo fled from Buenos Aires to a warship and resigned the next day, surrendering to military forces at La Plata. General Arturo Rawson was named by military as the new President of Argentina on Saturday but, after three days, announced on Monday that he would decline to be sworn in to office and would yield the position to General Pedro Ramirez.
- Henri Giraud was appointed Commander-in-Chief of Free French Forces.
- The German submarine U-308 was torpedoed and sunk with all 48 crew in the Norwegian Sea by the British submarine Truculent, while U-594 was sunk west of Gibraltar, with all of its crew of at least 44 men, by a rocket attack from a Lockheed Hudson of No. 48 Squadron RAF.
- Born:
  - John "Burgo" Burgess, Australian TV show host (including that nation's Wheel of Fortune show)
  - Joyce Meyer, American evangelist; in St. Louis
- Died: U.S. Army Major Kermit Roosevelt, 53, American explorer and author, and son of former U.S. President Theodore Roosevelt, shot himself to death while serving in Alaska at Fort Richardson.

== June 5, 1943 (Saturday) ==
- Pierre Laval, the puppet chief of government for Nazi occupied France, told his countrymen in a radio broadcast that an additional 200,000 Frenchmen needed to be sent to Germany to assist in war production.
- A state funeral was held in Japan for Isoroku Yamamoto.
- A squad of chemical warfare soldiers, making sure the wind was away from spectators, exploded small vials of mustard, chloro-picrine, lewisite and phosgene gases in a simulated air raid in New York City, to test the ability of civil defense workers to recognize the different chemical agents.
- The German submarine U-217 was depth charged and sunk in the Atlantic Ocean with all 44 crew by an American Grumman TBF Avenger from the escort carrier USS Bogue.Helgason, Guðmundur. "The Type VIID boat U-217". German U-boats of WWII – uboat.net.
- The British cargo ship Dumra was torpedoed near Durban, South Africa by the German sub U-198, killing 26 of her 93 crew.
- The German cargo ship Altenfels was torpedoed and sunk by the Norwegian navy south of Bergen, killing 22 civilians and 14 German Navy sailors.
- Josef Mengele was promoted to Chief Medical Examination Officer at Auschwitz in Poland.

== June 6, 1943 (Sunday) ==
- The new French Committee of National Liberation made a radio broadcast from Algiers pledging to abolish the "arbitrary powers" imposed by the Vichy government and to restore "all French liberties, the laws of the Republic and the Republican regime."
- Count Fleet won the Belmont Stakes to complete the American Triple Crown of Thoroughbred Racing. The thoroughbred had won the Kentucky Derby on May 1, and the Preakness Stakes only one week later, on May 8.
- Ohio University student Paul Newman, who had enlisted in the U.S. Navy four days before his 18th birthday, was called up for active duty. The future Oscar-winning film actor, nicknamed "Gus" Newman, enrolled in the pilot training program but was soon kicked out because it was discovered that he was color blind.
- Born: Richard Smalley, American chemist and physicist, winner of 1996 Nobel Prize in Chemistry for being a co-discoverer of buckminsterfullerene; in Akron, Ohio (died 2005)

== June 7, 1943 (Monday) ==
- General Arturo Rawson decided not to take office as President of Argentina after failing to get support from other officers, and yielded to General Pedro Ramirez.
- Born:
  - Chan Hung-lit, Chinese actor in the Hong Kong film and television industries; in Shanghai (died 2009)
  - Nikki Giovanni, American poet, in Knoxville, Tennessee (d. 2024)
  - Superstar Billy Graham, professional wrestler, in Phoenix, Arizona (d. 2023)

== June 8, 1943 (Tuesday) ==
- An explosion of ammunition on the Japanese battleship Mutsu killed 1,222 people while the ship was anchored in the harbor at Hashirajima. Extremely hot weather was blamed for the blast, and 1,121 of the 1,474 crew of Mutsu were killed, along with 101 bystanders. killing 1,222 people including 1,121 of the 1,474 member crew.
- Born: Colin Baker, British TV actor best known as the sixth Dr. Who; in London

== June 9, 1943 (Wednesday) ==
- The first automatic payroll tax in the United States was implemented by the passage of the Current Tax Payment Act of 1943, which was signed into law the next day. Under the new procedure, employers deducted the taxes from the employees' checks, then paid the equivalent amount to the federal government at the end of the month, replacing the system of employees paying taxes on their salaries at the end of each tax year.
- James F. Byrnes, the director of the U.S. Office of War Mobilization, told a press conference that he had no intention to be the Democratic nominee for vice president in 1944 if President Franklin Roosevelt pursued a fourth term.
- The Battle of Porta between the Royal Italian Army and the Greek People's Liberation Army ended in Thessaly the day after it started. Italian forces burned down the villages of Porta, Vatsiana, Trikala and Ropotania, and set fires in the city of Chania.
- Three days before his 19th birthday, future United States President George H. W. Bush became the youngest aviator in the U.S. Navy.

== June 10, 1943 (Thursday) ==
- The Pointblank directive was issued by the Combined Chiefs of Staff of the Allied powers, to implement Operation Pointblank, the code name for the constant Combined Bomber Offensive. The highest priority target to be destroyed was Germany's aircraft industry, followed by producers of ball bearings, petroleum, grinding wheels and abrasives. The U.S. Eighth Air Force bombed Germany during daylight and the UK's Royal Air Force Bomber Command conducted heavier bombing at night.

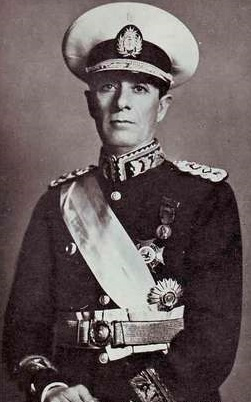
President Pedro Ramirez

- Germany and Italy gave diplomatic recognition to the new government of Argentina, the only nation in the Western Hemisphere that still maintained relations with the Axis powers. That night, however, the new regime of General Pedro Ramírez decreed that the German, Italian and Japanese would no longer have permission to transmit up to 100 words in code to their capitals, a privilege that had been extended back in December. The U.S. and the U.K. gave recognition to the Ramírez government the next day.
- The Berlin Gemeinde, the last Jewish hospital in the German capital, was closed, and its 200 employees and 300 patients were sent to Theresienstadt on June 16.
- The German hospital ship SS Birka struck a Soviet naval mine while traveling in Norway's Altafjord, and 115 people on board died.
- The American oil tanker Esso Gettysburg was torpedoed and sunk by the German U-boat U-66, killing 57 of her 72 crew. The 15 survivors were rescued by the U.S. Army transport USAT George Washington.
- The German transport KT 12 was sunk by the British ship HMS Safari with the loss of 27 of her 66 crew.

== June 11, 1943 (Friday) ==
- The Italian island of Pantelleria was surrendered to the Allies unconditionally at 11:40 am local time, after 19 days of aerial bombardment, providing a base from which the invasion of Sicily could be staged. "This marked the first time in history a complete surrender resulted solely from air attack without ground action", one historian would note later.
- Britain's Royal Air Force bombed Düsseldorf and Münster in its heaviest attack up to that time, while the U.S. 8th Air Force made a daylight raid on Wilhelmshaven and Cuxhaven. The U.S. raid involved 225 airplanes, and an unprecedented 85 of them were shot down or crashed. The 462 tons of bombs dropped was a new high for U.S. bombing.
- American coal miners went out on strike for the second time in two months, as UMWA President John L. Lewis called for the walkout against the federal government, which was overseeing the mines. President Roosevelt temporarily halted the strike by suggesting that he would ask Congress to pass a law to have striking miners drafted. Another strike would be called in October.
- The German submarine U-417 was sunk in the North Atlantic by a B-17 of No. 206 Squadron RAF, with the loss of all 46 crew. U-417 had shot down a U.S. Navy PBY Catalina before its own sinking, and eight of the nine Americans on board died after being adrift for five days.
- The Japanese submarine I-24 was sunk off Shemya, Alaska along with its 104 crew, by the U.S. Navy subchaser Larchmont.
- The Technicolor musical film Coney Island starring Betty Grable, George Montgomery and Cesar Romero was released.
- Born: Henry Hill, American mobster who became an FBI informant after being placed into the Witness Protection Program; in New York City (d.2012) His experience with the mob would later be the basis for the 1986 book, Wiseguy: Life in a Mafia Family and the 1990 film, Goodfellas.

== June 12, 1943 (Saturday) ==
- Düsseldorf suffered its heaviest air raid of the war when 693 bombers dropped 2,000 tons of bombs in the space of 45 minutes.
- The American submarine USS R-12 was on practice maneuvers when it sank without warning, plunging to the bottom of the sea near Key West, Florida, with the loss of 42 of the 47 people on board. The R-12 would not be relocated until almost 68 years later, on May 25, 2011.
- The U.S. submarine R-12 sank in a diving accident during trials in the Florida Strait, killing 42 of the 57 people aboard.
- The German submarine U-118 was depth charged and sunk in the Atlantic by an American Grumman TBM Avenger, with the loss of 36 of its 52 crew. Another 16 survivors were rescued by the American escort USS Osmond Ingram.
- "Taking a Chance on Love" by Benny Goodman and His Orchestra hit #1 on the Billboard singles chart.
- Born: Friedrich Kittler, German literary scholar; in Rochlitz (died 2011)

== June 13, 1943 (Sunday) ==
- Subhas Chandra Bose, the Indian nationalist who had recently been in Nazi Germany seeking aid for independence from the United Kingdom, arrived in Japan on an Axis submarine.
- The Zoot Suit Riots ended in Los Angeles after ten days. Although there was property damage, nobody was killed or severely injured.
- The U.S. Coast Guard cutter USCGC Escanaba exploded and sank in the North Atlantic Ocean, with the loss of 101 of its 103 crew.
- The Japanese submarine I-9 was sunk off Kiska, along with all of its 101 crew, by the destroyer USS Frazier.
- Born: Malcolm McDowell, British film and television actor known for starring in A Clockwork Orange (1971) and Time After Time, Caligula (1979) and Halloween (2007); in Horsforth, West Riding of Yorkshire
- Died: Brigadier General Nathan Bedford Forrest III of the U.S. Army Air Forces, 38, was killed when the bomber he was riding in as an observer was shot down over Kiel during a raid. Forrest was the great-grandson of Confederate Army General Nathan Bedford Forrest.

== June 14, 1943 (Monday) ==
- In the case of West Virginia State Board of Education v. Barnette, Flag Day in the United States, the U.S. Supreme Court, ruled 6 to 3, that schoolchildren could not be required to pledge allegiance to or salute the American flag, if it violated their religious beliefs. The suit had been brought by Walter Barnette and other members of the Jehovah's Witnesses, and led to the Court overruling its 1940 decision in Minersville School District v. Gobitis.
- An American scientist, given the code name "Quantum" by the Soviet NKVD, met with officials at the Soviet Embassy in Washington, DC, and turned over classified scientific information about separating the isotope Uranium-235 from uranium, part of the American atomic bomb project. The American FBI and NSA intercepted news of the meeting from a cable sent on June 21 from the KGB's New York office, but were never able to learn the identity of "Quantum". More than sixty years later, "Quantum" was discovered from declassified files from the former Soviet Union to have been Boris Podolsky.
- Earl Browder, the General Secretary of the Communist Party USA, began a correspondence with U.S. President Roosevelt, when Browder sent a cable to the President asking for White House intervention to protect leftist Victorio Codovilla from being deported from Argentina to Spain. Roosevelt responded on June 23, pledging to ask the U.S. Ambassador at Buenos Aires to monitor the proceedings, and on June 26 sent Browder a second letter to advise that Cordovilla would not be deported. The last reply was on July 12, when Browder thanked the President.
- The German submarines U-334 (with 47 crew) and U-564 (with 34 of its 52 crew) were sunk by a British RAF plane. in the Atlantic Ocean. The German minesweeper M-83, with 70 crew was sunk by British torpedo boats near the Channel Islands.
- Born: Jim Sensenbrenner, U.S. Representative for Wisconsin from 1979 to 2021; in Chicago

== June 15, 1943 (Tuesday) ==
- In Beaumont, Texas, a mob of about 4,000 men, half of them employees of the Pennsylvania Shipyards, began burning and looting homes, businesses and automobiles in the city's African-American neighborhoods. Texas State Guardsmen and Texas Rangers were called out by Acting Governor A. M. Aiken to assist Beaumont city police in keeping order, and martial law was declared in the city, lasting until June 20.
- The prototype of the first turbojet powered bomber, Germany's Arado Ar 234 V1, made its first flight.
- The Soviet Navy minesweeper BTSC-411 Zashchitnik was torpedoed and sunk in the Black Sea by the German U-Boat U-24 with the loss of 26 of its 52 crew.
- The Norwegian cargo ship MV Høegh Silverdawn was shelled and sunk with the loss of 36 of its 58 crew.
- Born:
  - Poul Nyrup Rasmussen, Prime Minister of Denmark from 1993 to 2001; in Esbjerg
  - Johnny Hallyday (stage name for Jean-Philippe Smet), French rock singer; in Paris. (died 2017)

== June 16, 1943 (Wednesday) ==
- Subhas Chandra Bose met in Tokyo with Japanese Premier Hideki Tojo, and obtained a promise that Japan would help India gain its independence from the United Kingdom.
- The Italian passenger ship Terni was torpedoed and sunk by the British ship HMS Unison, killing 39 of the people on board.
- The German submarine U-97 was sunk west of Haifa by a Lockheed Hudson aircraft of No. 459 Squadron RAAF, with the loss of 27 of its 48 crew. U-97 had sunk 15 merchant ships and the British warship HMS Camito in 28 months.

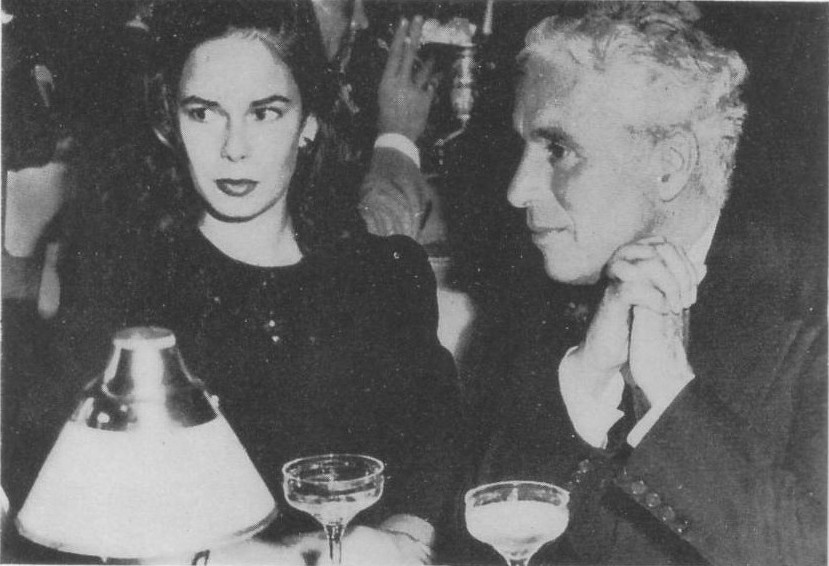
Oona and Charlie in 1944

- Charlie Chaplin married Oona O'Neill, the daughter of playwright Eugene O'Neill, who then disowned his daughter. The Chaplins would raise eight children together and settle in Switzerland.
- Born: Joan Van Ark, American TV actress known for Knots Landing; in New York City

== June 17, 1943 (Thursday) ==
- The sinking of the British troopship SS Yoma killed 484 of the 1,961 people aboard, after the German submarine U-81 torpedoed the vessel northwest of Derna, Libya.
- Ayoub Tabet, the President of Lebanon, precipitated a crisis in the Middle Eastern nation that was populated by Muslims and Christians. Tabet changed the makeup of the 63 seat Chamber of Deputies, which had 34 Christians and 29 Muslims. The new arrangement was for a 54-seat body, with 32 seats for Christians and 22 for Muslims. The decision set out rioting throughout Lebanon, and Tabet would be deposed a month later.
- The Japanese submarine I-178 sent its last radio call, and then went missing somewhere off the east coast of Australia, along with its crew of 86. The wreckage would still be missing more than 80 years later.
- The Japanese Navy ship Myoko Maru was torpedoed northeast of New Guinea by the U.S. Navy submarine USS Drum, killing 35 people.
- The Norwegian tanker Ferncastle was torpedoed by the German auxiliary cruiser Michel, killing 24 of heher 37 crew.
- Singer Perry Como signed a record contract with RCA and began a string of hit songs with the RCA label, recording well into the 1980s.
- Joe Cronin of the Boston Red Sox became the first player in major league baseball history to swat pinch-hit home runs in both games of a doubleheader.

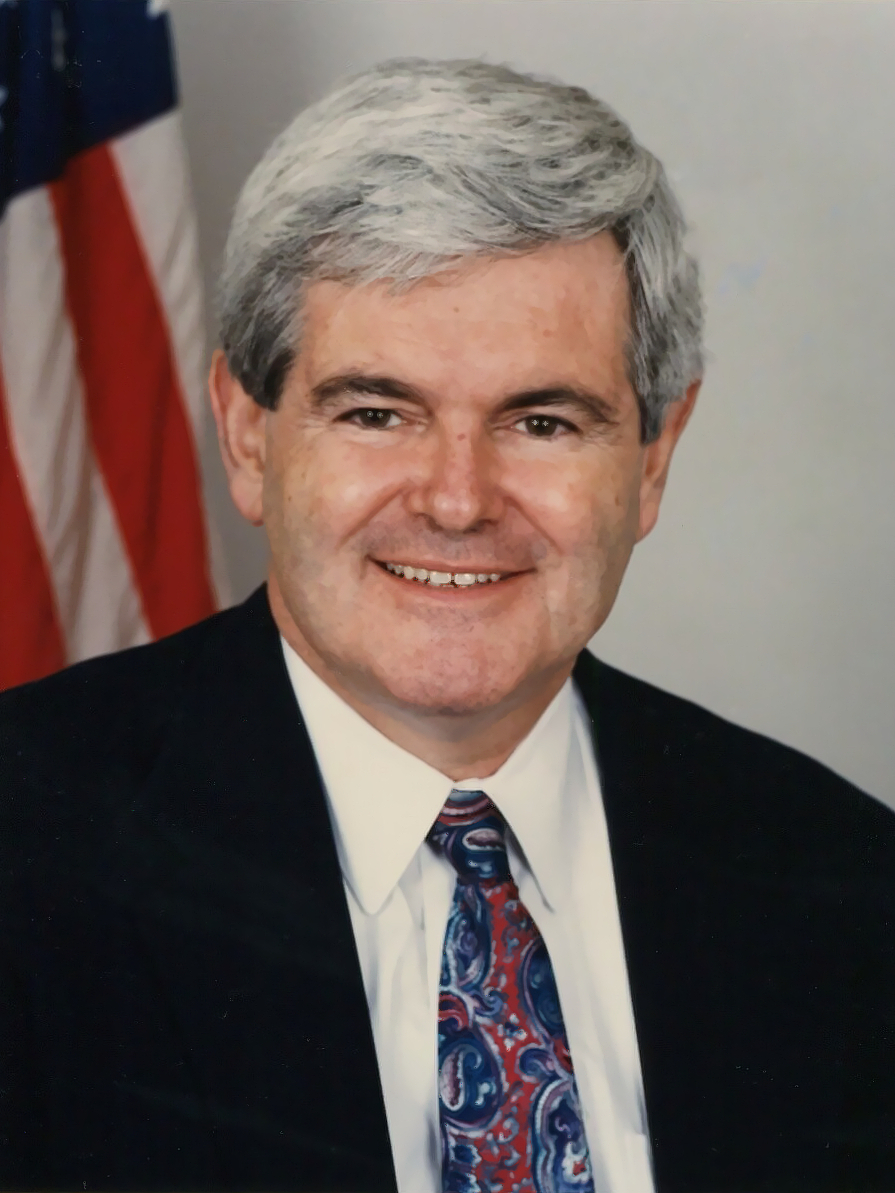
Speaker Newt Gingrich

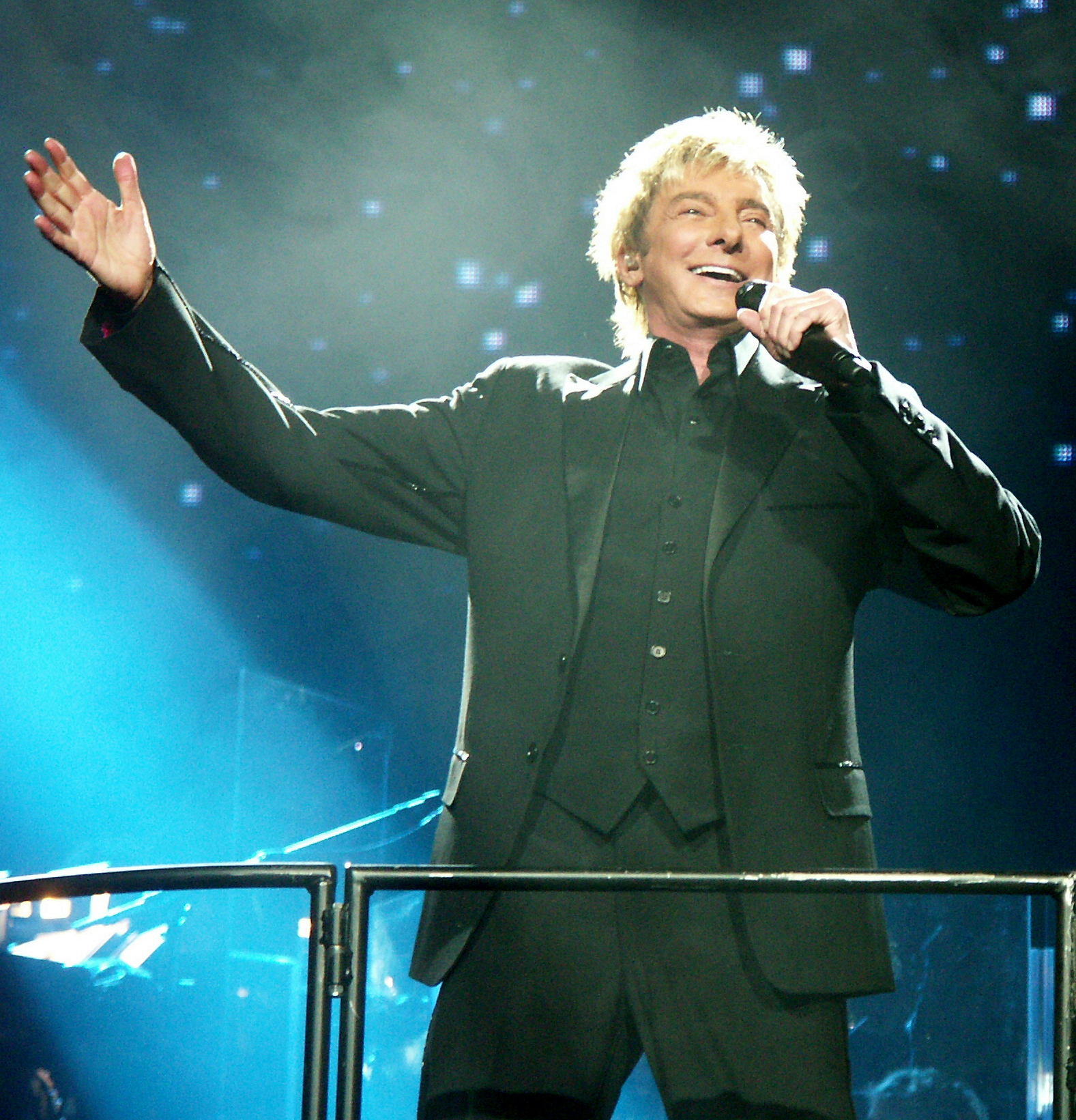
Singer Barry Manilow

- Born:
  - Newt Gingrich, Speaker of the U.S. House of Representatives from 1995 to 1999, and Congressman (R-Georgia) from 1979 to 1999; as Newton Leroy McPherson in Harrisburg, Pennsylvania
  - Barry Manilow, American pop musician; as Barry Alan Pincus, in Brooklyn, New York City

== June 18, 1943 (Friday) ==
Tuskegee Airmen plane insignia

- The Tuskegee Airmen had their first encounter with the enemy, as six pilots of P-40 Warhawks were attacked over the island of Pantelleria by 12 German Focke-Wulf 190 fighters. According to the U.S. Army Air Corps, "The American Negro fliers, led by First Lieut. Charles W. Dryden ... parried the Nazi thrust, damaged two German fighters, and forced the remainder to retire. The Americans all came home safely."
- Ahead of the upcoming Allied invasion of Sicily, Winston Churchill discreetly removed Field Marshal Sir Archibald Wavell and General Claude Auchinleck from their positions of command in battlefield zones by appointing them Viceroy of India and Commander-in-Chief, India, respectively.
- Born:
  - Willie Irvine, Northern Ireland footballer with 23 caps for the Northern Ireland national team; in Eden, County Antrim (d. 2025)
  - Raffaella Carrà, Italian singer, actress and presenter in Bologna (d. 2021)

== June 19, 1943 (Saturday) ==
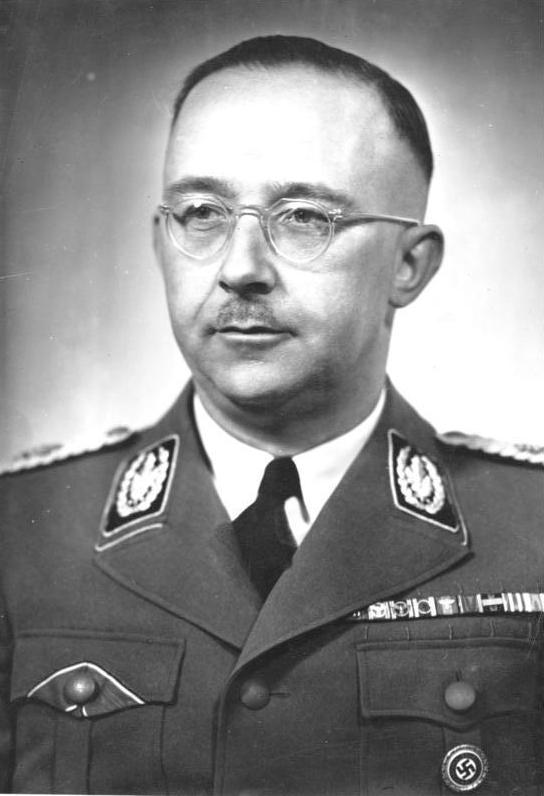
Heinrich Himmler
- Germany's Führer, Adolf Hitler, summoned SS Chief Heinrich Himmler to the Führer's mountain retreat at Obersalzberg. According to a memorandum of the secret meeting, which Himmler entitled Banditenkampf und Sicherheitslage (The fight against bandits and the security situation), Hitler ordered that the Jewish resistance in Eastern Europe (by "bandits") should be eradicated over the next four months by the mass evacuation of Jews.
- The Italian submarine Barbarigo was sunk with all 58 of its crew in the Mediterranean Sea by U.S. aircraft.
- The U.S. Liberty Ship Henry Knox was torpedoed by the Japanese submarine I-37 and sunk in the Indian Ocean near the Maldives, killing 25 of the 91 crewmen and gunners. The 55 survivors of Henry Knox sailed in lifeboats for 11 days before being rescued, and 26 of them died during the journey.

== June 20, 1943 (Sunday) ==
- A fistfight at the crowded Belle Island park in Detroit, Michigan, erupted into a riot between white and black residents of the fourth largest city in the United States. Over three days, 34 people were killed and 760 injured, before federal troops were sent in to restore the peace.
- The Battle of Lababia Ridge began between Australian and Japanese troops in the Territory of New Guinea and would last until June 23.
- The German submarine U-388 was depth charged and sunk off Cape Farewell, Greenland by a Consolidated PBY Catalina of the U.S. Navy, with the loss of all 47 of its crew.
- The comic strip Penny, by Harry Haenigsen, first appeared in newspapers. Haenigsen would discontinue the strip in 1970, after the death of his wife in an automobile accident.

== June 21, 1943 (Monday) ==
- Heinrich Himmler issued the order to transfer the remaining Jews from the Nazi-occupied Baltic states to small slave-labor camps in order to meet Germany's military needs. The Reichskommissariat Ostland consisted of Latvia (Lettland), Lithuania (Litauen), Estonia (Estland), and Belarus (Weissruthenian).
- The National Football League approved the temporary merger of the Philadelphia Eagles and the Pittsburgh Steelers into a single franchise, officially called "Phil-Pitt", and dubbed the "Steagles" by the press the next month. At the same time, the NFL owners declined to let the Bears and Cardinals merge for the season.
- In occupied Greece, as part of Operation Animals, British SOE agents destroyed the railway bridge over the Asopos River, and guerrillas of the Greek People's Liberation Army ambushed and destroyed a German convoy at the Battle of Sarantaporos.

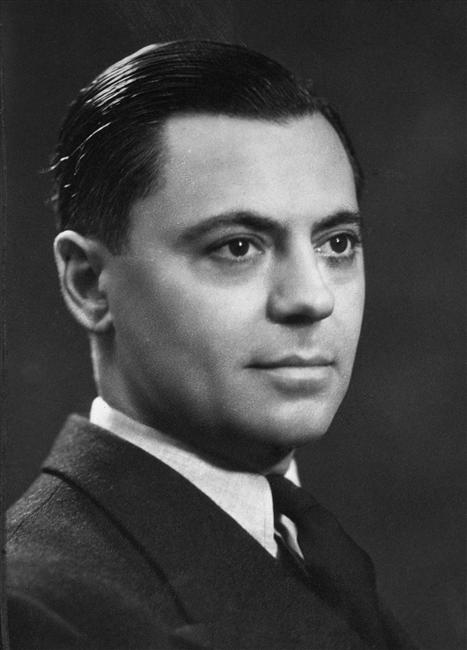
Moulin

- Jean Moulin, an official of the Armée secrète and a leader of the French Resistance against the Nazis, was captured in Caluire-et-Cuire by the Gestapo, along with nine of his associates. Captain Klaus Barbie, who oversaw Gestapo operations in nearby Lyon, had been tipped off to Moulin's location. Moulin was tortured for more than two weeks before dying on July 8.
- In Stack v. Boyle, the U.S. Supreme Court ruled, 5–3, that the American citizenship of an alien could not be revoked simply because he had joined the Communist Party. William Schneiderman, a Russian native, had become a citizen in 1927, and then had proceedings brought against him twelve years later for his activities as secretary for the California branch of the U.S. Communist Party. Schneiderman's case was argued by Wendell Willkie, who had been the Republican candidate for president in 1940.
- The U.S. House of Representatives voted 345–0 to approve the appropriation of $71,510,438,873 for the U.S. Army, the biggest supply bill in history.
- The Harvard Corporation rejected a recommendation, by the faculty of the Harvard Medical School, to admit women to the college's M.D. program. The corporation would allow the admission of women in 1944.
- The British cargo ship Brinkburn was torpedoed by the German sub U-73, losing 29 of her 31 crew.

== June 22, 1943 (Tuesday) ==
- After the U.S. Army Air Forces lost 85 aircraft in the June 11 daylight raid on Wilhelmshaven and Cuxhaven, the second heaviest bombing by the U.S. of Germany took place, with only one-fifth of the losses. The 8th Air Force dropped 422 tons of bombs, and lost 16 planes.
- The Japanese submarine I-7 was shelled by the U.S. ship USS Monaghan in the Aleutian Islands and ran aground at Kiska, Alaska, with the loss of 87 crew.
- The French oiler Lot was sunk by the German U-boat U-572, killing 23 of her 136 crew.
- The U.S. Navy ship USS LST-333 was torpedoed by the German U-boat U-593, losing 25 of its 288 crew.

== June 23, 1943 (Wednesday) ==
- Elections for all 138 seats in the Dáil Éireann were held in the Republic of Ireland. The incumbent Fianna Fáil led by Éamon de Valera remained in power but was reduced to a minority government.Fianna Fáil, led by Prime Minister Éamon de Valera, lost 10 seats and its majority, falling from 77 to 67 seats but retained control of the government.
- The Battle of Lababia Ridge by the Australian 2/6th Infantry Battalion against Japan's 66th Infantry Regiment ended in an Australian victory, despite the Australian's 150 troops being outnumbered by 1,500 Japanese troops.

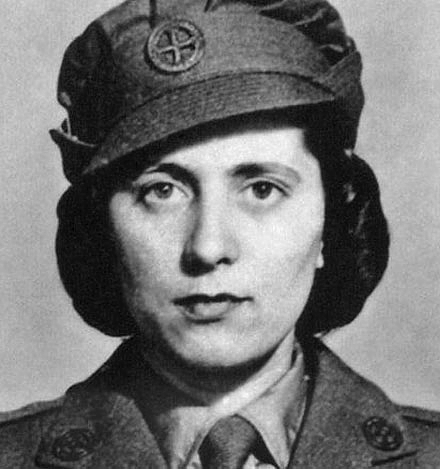
SOE agent Borrel

- Andrée Borrel, Francis Suttill, Gilbert Norman and several other agents in the Prosper network of British Special Operations Executive, were arrested by the Gestapo after being betrayed by an informer. Borrel was one of seven women in the British spy network. On July 6, 1944, the group would be rendered unconscious with an injection of phenol, then burned alive.
- Born:
  - Peter Calamai, science journalist and Member of the Order of Canada; in Berwick, Pennsylvania (d. 2019)
  - James Levine, music director for the Metropolitan Opera, and conductor 1971–2011; in Cincinnati (d. 2021)

== June 24, 1943 (Thursday) ==
- In order to investigate the medical effects of an emergency bailout at high altitude, Colonel W. Randolph Lovelace, a physician in the U.S. Army, jumped out of a B-17 bomber at an altitude of 40,200 feet. Part of his self-experimentation was to show that bottled oxygen should be provided to bomber crews. Colonel Lovelace was rendered temporarily unconscious from the 32 G shock from opening his chute during his faster descent in the thin atmosphere, and suffered severe frostbite when the deceleration ripped off his left glove, but landed safely after 24 minutes. As a result of Lovelace's experience, flight crews learned to delay opening their chutes until they reached a lower altitude. Lovelace would be awarded the Distinguished Flying Cross for his bravery.

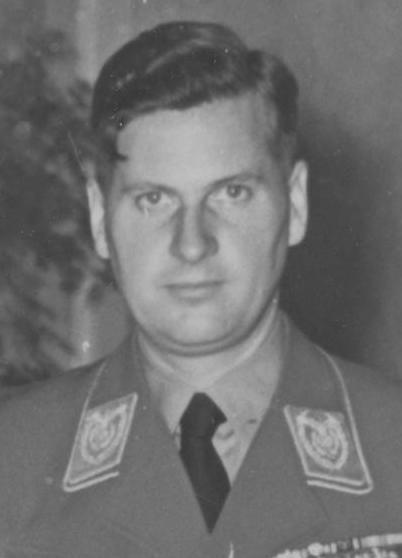
Baldur von Schirach

- Baldur von Schirach, the 36-year-old leader of the Hitler Youth, lost the influence he had had on the Nazi German government, after arguing with the Führer, Adolf Hitler, about the need to end the war with the Allies. Schirach would continue to be the Reichsjugendführer, but Hitler would never talk to him again.
- The German submarines U-119 (with 52 crew), U-194 (with 54), U-200 (with 68) and U-449 (with 49) were all lost to enemy action, with no survivors.
- The British tanker British Venture was sunk by the Japanese submarine I-27 in the Gulf of Oman, killing 42 of the 61 people on board.
- The Frank Borzage-directed musical film Stage Door Canteen was released.

== June 25, 1943 (Friday) ==
- The eradication of Jews by the Nazi in the Ukrainian city of Stanislav (now Ivano-Frankivsk) was completed, with less than 100 surviving out of several thousand.
- The Smith–Connally Act, allowing the federal government to seize and operate industries threatened by or under strikes that would interfere with war production, was passed over President Roosevelt's veto, by a 56 to 25 vote in the Senate and 244 to 108 vote in the House of Representatives.
- Born: Carly Simon, American pop musician known for "You're So Vain"; in New York City

== June 26, 1943 (Saturday) ==
- More than 200 German Navy crewmen, from six different U-boats based in Nazi-occupied Norway, mutinied. The men refused to obey orders to go out to sea, where Allied ships had been destroying the submarines at a greatly increased rate since May. The mutineers were arrested and lodged in the Akershus Prison in Oslo.
- The U.S. Congress voted overwhelmingly to override President Roosevelt's veto of the Conally-Smith-Harness anti-strike bill. Roosevelt's veto message was read to the Senate, citing the likelihood that the bill was "more likely to foment labor troubles than to settle them". Five minutes later, the Senate voted 56–25 to pass the bill, and the House followed later in the day with a 244–108 override.

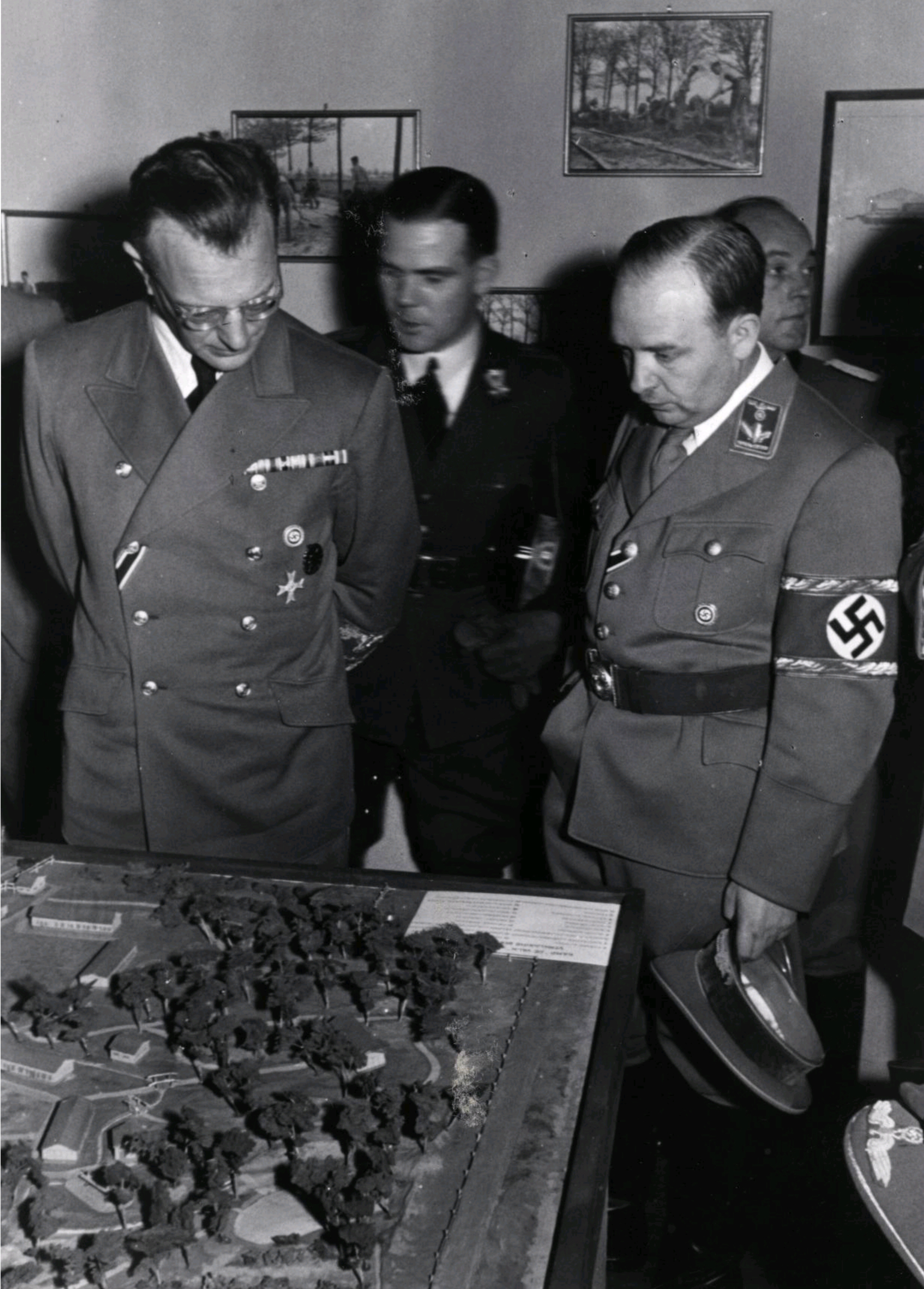
Commissioner-General Schmidt (on right)

- The Japanese Navy transport Shinryu Maru caught fire and exploded after running aground in a storm, killing 129 of the 150 people aboard, and the Japanese cargo ship Shozan Maru was sunk by the USS Jack, killing 60 people aboard.
- Born: Warren Farrell, American educator, gender equality activist and author; in Queens, New York City.
- Died:
  - Karl Landsteiner, 75, Austrian biologist and physician who was awarded the Nobel Prize in Physiology or Medicine in 1930 for his 1900 discovery of the distinction between major blood groups
  - Fritz Schmidt, German Commissioner-General for the Netherlands, died after jumping, falling or being pushed from a train.

== June 27, 1943 (Sunday) ==
- An empty American P-38 fighter, whose pilot had bailed out after the plane caught fire; crashed into a crowd of beachgoers at Huntington Beach, California, and then exploded injuring 49 people, three of them fatally.
- Dresdner SC won the German football soccer championship game of Nazi Germany, defeating KSG FV/AK Saarbrücken, 3 to 0, before a crowd of 80,000 people at the Olympiastadion in Berlin
- Died: Edward O'Rourke, 66, Belarusian Roman Catholic priest, bishop of Riga from 1918 to 1920 and bishop of Danzig from 1922 to 1926

== June 28, 1943 (Monday) ==
- Germany began construction of four large V-1 flying bombs launch complexes, with 15 foot thick roofs and reinforced walls that were designed to withstand bombing, to launch missiles at the United Kingdom. The missile bases were located in France along the English Channel, at Seninghem, Tamerville, Couville and Siracourt.
- The Peenemünde Army Research Center successfully launched Germany's ballistic missile, the V2 rocket. As Adolf Hitler watched, the initial launch ended with the rocket crash-landing nearby, but the second launch successfully traveled 142 miles to land in the Baltic Sea.
- SS Major Karl Bischoff reported to Berlin that the four new crematoria that had been built at the Auschwitz concentration camp were completed. Crematorium Number 1 could process 340 bodies per day, while the four new ones could handle 4,400.
- The Battle of Viru Harbor began between American and Japanese forces on New Georgia and would last until July 1, with an American victory.
- The Norwegian cargo ship Dah Puh broke in two after being torpedoed in Muscat Harbor at Oman by the Japanese sub I-27, killing 44 of its crew.
- Born:
  - Klaus von Klitzing, German physicist, recipient of the 1985 Nobel Prize in Physics for his discovery of the Quantum Hall effect; in Środa Wielkopolska, in German-occupied Poland
  - Ismael Laguna, Panamanian boxer and world lightweight champion, 1965–1970; in Colón
  - Ed Pastor, American Congressman and first Hispanic-American to represent Arizona in the U.S. House of Representatives (1991–2003); in Claypool, Arizona (died 2018)

== June 29, 1943 (Tuesday) ==
- In advance of the Allied invasion of Sicily, General Dwight D. Eisenhower, the Allied Supreme Commander, sent a cablegram from North Africa requesting "on early convoy ... shipment three million bottled Coca-Cola (filled) and complete equipment for bottling, washing, capping same quantity twice monthly", with the Coca-Cola Company sending "technical observers" to assist in the operation.
- The U.S. Senate passed the first, and thus far, only national child-care program, voting $20,000,000 to provide for federal care of children whose mothers were employed for the duration of World War II.
- U.S. Vice President Henry A. Wallace made "an ill-considered speech" that attacked U.S. Secretary of Commerce Jesse H. Jones. The speech, which some historians cite as a factor in President Roosevelt's decision to select another running mate for the 1944 election, may have cost Wallace a chance to become President of the United States on Roosevelt's death in 1945.
- Pope Pius XII issued the encyclical Mystici corporis Christi ("Of the Mystical Body of Christ"). The encyclical asserted that the Roman Catholic Church was exclusively the Mystical Body of Christ, as well as condemning the beliefs of Nazi doctrine, and expressing "profound grief" over the extermination by Germany of disabled people. The Pope noted also that within Catholicism, "Our paternal love embraces all peoples, whatever their nationality or race," and urged all Catholics to "follow our peaceful King [Jesus Christ] who taught us to love not only those who are of a different nation or race, but even our enemies."
- The Japanese Navy transport Shinryu Maru exploded three days after running aground in the Kurile Islands and the detonation of ammunition by a fire. In all, 129 people were killed.
- Born:
  - Little Eva (stage name for Eva Narcissus Boyd), American pop singer; in Belhaven, North Carolina (died 2003)
  - Ahmed Sofa, Bangladeshi poet and novelist, in Chittagong, Bengal Province, British India (died 2001)

== June 30, 1943 (Wednesday) ==
- Operation Cartwheel began in the South Pacific Ocean, as Allied troops, under the direction of Admiral Bull Halsey, landed at the Japanese-controlled islands of New Georgia Rendova. The campaign would last more than three months until the Allied victory on October 7. The death toll would be estimated later at 1,195 Allied troops (from the U.S., Australia, New Zealand and the British Solomon Islands) and 1,671 of the Japanese.
- Allied forces from the U.S. and Australia carried out the amphibious Landing at Nassau Bay in New Guinea, and would succeed on July 6 in driving out the occupying Imperial Japanese forces.
- The Battle of Wickham Anchorage began between U.S. and Japanese forces on Vangunu Island in the Solomon Islands, and would last for three days until the U.S. victory on July 3. In the battle, 141 Japanese soldiers and 25 Americans were killed.
- The USS McCawley (APA-4) was torpedoed and sunk by Japanese aircraft. Of 478 crew, 15 men in the engine room were killed by the torpedo, but the rest were safely rescued to the destroyer USS McCalla.
- Born:
  - Tenzin Palmo, English-born Tibetan Buddhist nun; as Diane Perry in Woolmers Park, Hertfordshire.
  - Florence Ballard, one of the founding members of the popular female Motown vocal group The Supremes; in Detroit (died from a heart attack, 1976)
