= Flutto-class submarine =

Italian submarine class

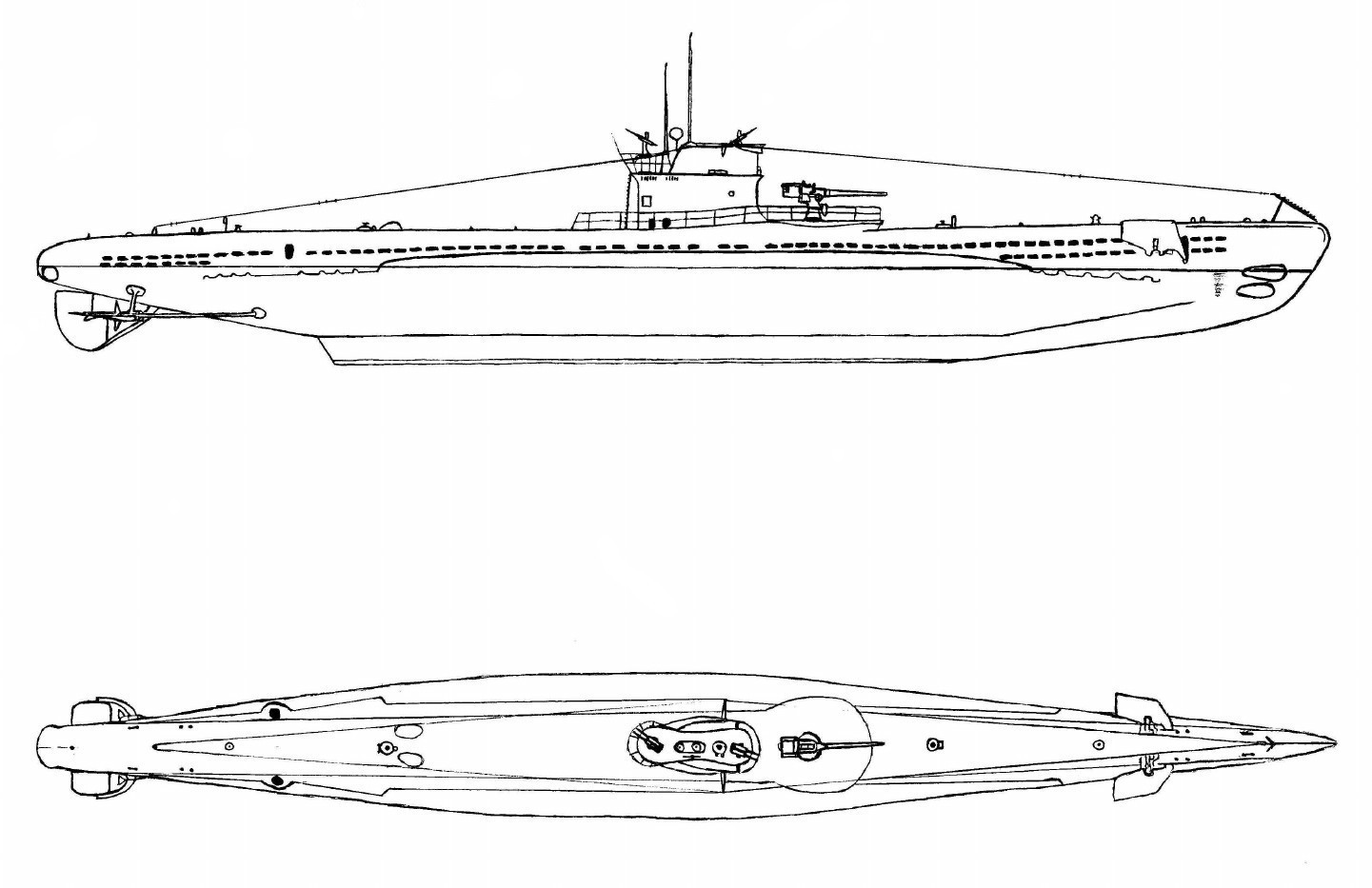

Class overview
- Name: Flutto class
- Builders: Odero Terni Orlando (OTO); Cantieri Riuniti dell' Adriatico (CRDA); Tosi
- Operators: Regia Marina
- In commission: 1942–1967
- Planned: 48
- Completed: 13

General characteristics
- Type: Submarine
- Displacement: 930 long tons (945 t) surfaced; 1,093 long tons (1,111 t) submerged
- Length: 63.15 m (207 ft 2.2 in)
- Beam: 6.98 m (22 ft 10.8 in)
- Draught: 4.87 m (15 ft 11.7 in)
- Propulsion: 2 shafts; 2 Diesel engines, 2,400 hp (1,800 kW); 2 Electric motors, 800 bhp (600 kW)
- Speed: 16 knots (30 km/h; 18 mph) surfaced; 8 knots (15 km/h; 9.2 mph) submerged
- Range: 5,400 nmi (10,000 km; 6,200 mi) at 8 knots (15 km/h; 9.2 mph) surfaced; 80 nmi (150 km) at 4 knots (7.4 km/h; 4.6 mph) submerged
- Test depth: 400 ft (120 m)
- Complement: 49
- Armament: 1 × 100 mm (4 in) / 47 caliber gun; 4 × 13.2 mm anti-aircraft guns; 6 × 21 in (533 mm) torpedo tubes (4 bow, 2 stern); 12 torpedoes

The Flutto class were a large class of submarines built for the Italian Royal Navy (Regia Marina) during the Second World War.

The Fluttos were a development of the 600 Series of medium-sized, or seagoing, submarines. They were built to a partial double-hulled Bernardis design, influenced by war-time experience and construction adapted for mass construction. The Fluttos were good sea-boats with improved internal arrangements, hull strength, anti-aircraft armament and diving times. They are regarded as the best medium-displacement submarines built by Italy up to that time. A total of 48 submarines were ordered, in three series (referred to as "Types"). The name Flutto means “wave”, and the Type I vessels were named for marine terms and sea-creatures. The Type II and Type III vessels all bore names of metals.

== Type I ==
The first series of 12 vessels were laid down in 1941; six from CRDA, and three each from OTO and Tosi. Of these 10 were commissioned and saw action; two others were unfinished at the Italian armistice in September 1943 and work on them was abandoned. Of the 10 vessels which became operational, three were sunk by the Allies, and four scuttled at the armistice. These were all raised by the Germans and re-fitted, but all four were sunk in Allied air raids during 1944. Three others were surrendered to the Allies and survived the war. Two vessels, Grongo and Murena, fitted with containers for carrying Maiale manned torpedoes, for operations by the Decima MAS special operations force.

== Type II ==
The second series of 24 were to the same design, though enlarged slightly to resolve trim problems highlighted in the first vessels. These were laid down in 1942, 15 from CRDA, six from OTO and three from Tosi. These constructions were overtaken by Italy's collapse in September 1943, and none had been completed at that time. Most of these hulls fell into German hands, and work was continued on several, but none became operational before Germany's surrender in 1945.

== Type III ==
The third series were a copy of the Type II design, and were due to be started in 1943, but none had been laid down by the time of Italy's surrender in September of that year. All were subsequently cancelled.

== Ships ==
Type I

- Cernia: Tosi: Work suspended September 1943 at armistice; laid up 1944
- Dentice: Tosi: Work suspended September 1943 at armistice; laid up 1944
- Flutto: Launched at CRDA 19.11.42; sunk 11.7.43 by British MTBs
- Gorgo: Launched at CRDA 31.1.42; sunk 21.5.43 by US destroyer Nields
- Grongo: Launched at OTO 6.5.43; scuttled in September 1943 at armistice. Raised by the Germans as UIT 20; destroyed in air raid in 1944
- Marea: Launched at CRDA 10.12.42; surrendered to the Allies in September 1943
- Murena: Launched at OTO 11.4.43; scuttled in September 1943 at armistice. Raised by the Germans as UIT 16; destroyed in air raid in 1944
- Nautilo: Launched at CRDA 20.3.43; scuttled in September 1943 at armistice. Raised by the Germans as UIT 19; destroyed in air raid in 1944
- Sparide: Launched at OTO 21.2.43; scuttled in September 1943 at armistice. Raised by the Germans as UIT 15; destroyed in air raid in 1944
- Spigola: Tosi; work suspended in September 1943 at armistice. Broken up in 1948
- Tritone: Launched at CRDA 3.1.42; sunk 19.1.43 by destroyer Antelope and corvette Port Arthur
- Vortice: Launched at CRDA 23.2.43; surrendered to the Allies in September 1943

Type II

- Aluminio: OTO; unfinished at armistice in September 1943; broken up by the Germans
- Antinomio: OTO; unfinished at armistice in September 1943; broken up by the Germans
- Bario: CRDA: unfinished at armistice September 43, continued by Germans, launched 23.1.44 UIT 7. Scuttled May 45
- Cromo: CRDA: unfinished at armistice September 43, broken up by Germans
- Ferro: CRDA: unfinished at armistice, continued by Germans as UIT 12 destroyed unfinished May 45
- Fosforo: OTO: unfinished at armistice September 43, broken up by Germans
- Litio: CRDA: unfinished at armistice September 43, continued by Germans, launched 19.2.44 as UIT 8. Scuttled May 45
- Manganese: OTO; unfinished at armistice in September 1943; broken up by the Germans
- Piombo: CRDA: Unfinished at armistice September 43, continued by Germans as UIT 13, destroyed unfinished May 45
- Potassio: CRDA: Unfinished at armistice September 43, continued by Germans as UIT 10, destroyed unfinished May 45
- Rame: CRDA: Unfinished at armistice September 43, continued by Germans as UIT 11, destroyed unfinished May 45
- Silicio: OTO; unfinished at armistice in September 1943; broken up by the Germans
- Sodio: CRDA: unfinished at armistice September 43, continued by Germans, launched 16.3.44 as UIT 9. Scuttled May 45
- Zinco: CRDA: Unfinished at armistice September 43, continued by Germans as UIT 14, destroyed unfinished May 45
- Zolfo: OTO; unfinished at armistice in September 1943; broken up by the Germans
- Amianto: Tosi: not laid down before armistice; cancelled
- Magnesio: Tosi: not laid down before armistice; cancelled
- Cadmio: CRDA: not laid down before armistice; cancelled
- Tridio: CRDA: not laid down before armistice; cancelled
- Mercurio: CRDA: not laid down before armistice; cancelled
- Oro: CRDA: not laid down before armistice; cancelled
- Ottone: CRDA: not laid down before armistice; cancelled
- Ruthenio: CRDA: not laid down before armistice; cancelled
- Vanadio: CRDA: not laid down before armistice; cancelled

Type III

(All vessels: Not laid down before armistice; cancelled)

- Attinio
- Azoto
- Bromo
- Carbonio
- Elio
- Molibdeno
- Osmio
- Osigeno
- Plutonio
- Radio
- Selenio
- Tungsteno

== See also ==
- Italian submarines of World War II
