= Italian submarine Flutto =

Italian submarine

History

Italy
- Name: Flutto
- Builder: CRDA, Monfalcone
- Launched: 19 November 1942
- Fate: Sunk, 11 July 1943

General characteristics
- Class & type: Flutto-class submarine
- Displacement: 930 tonnes (915 long tons) surfaced; 1,093 tonnes (1,076 long tons) submerged
- Length: 63.15 m (207 ft 2 in)
- Beam: 6.98 m (22 ft 11 in)
- Draft: 4.87 m (16 ft 0 in)
- Installed power: 2,400 bhp (1,800 kW) (diesels); 800 hp (600 kW) (electric motors)
- Propulsion: Diesel-electric; 2 × diesel engines; 2 × electric motors
- Speed: 16 knots (30 km/h; 18 mph) surfaced; 8 knots (15 km/h; 9.2 mph) submerged
- Range: 5,400 nmi (10,000 km; 6,200 mi) at 8 knots (15 km/h; 9.2 mph) surfaced; 80 nmi (150 km; 92 mi) at 4 knots (7.4 km/h; 4.6 mph) submerged
- Test depth: 80 m (260 ft)
- Complement: 50
- Armament: 6 × 533 mm (21 in) torpedo tubes (4 bow, 2 stern); 1 × 100 mm (4 in) / 47 caliber deck gun; 2 × 20 mm (0.79 in) anti-aircraft guns

The Italian submarine Flutto was the name ship of her class of submarines built for the Royal Italian Navy (Regia Marina) during World War II. She obtained no successes during her short career, and was sunk by British ships during the Invasion of Sicily in 1943.

== Design and description ==
The Flutto-class submarines were designed as improved versions of the preceding Argo class. They displaced 930 metric tons (920 long tons) surfaced and 1,093 metric tons (1,076 long tons) submerged. The submarines were 63.15 meters (207 ft 2 in) long, had a beam of 6.98 meters (22 ft 11 in) and a draft of 4.87 meters (16 ft 0 in).

For surface running, the boats were powered by two 1,200-brake-horsepower (895 kW) diesel engines, each driving one propeller shaft. When submerged each propeller was driven by a 400-horsepower (298 kW) electric motor. They could reach 16 knots (30 km/h; 18 mph) on the surface and 8 knots (15 km/h; 9.2 mph) underwater. On the surface, the Flutto class had a range of 5,400 nautical miles (10,000 km; 6,200 mi) at 8 knots (15 km/h; 9.2 mph), submerged, they had a range of 80 nmi (150 km; 92 mi) at 4 knots (7.4 km/h; 4.6 mph).

The boats were armed with six internal 53.3 cm (21.0 in) torpedo tubes, four in the bow and two in the stern. One reload were stowed for each tube, which gave them a total of twelve torpedoes. They were also armed with one 100 mm (4 in) deck gun and two 20 mm (0.79 in) anti-aircraft guns for combat on the surface.

== Construction and career ==
Flutto was built by CRDA at Monfalcone on the Adriatic coast, and was launched on 19 November 1942. After commissioning and working up Flutto saw action against Allied naval forces in the Mediterranean. She had no successes, and was lost in action in July 1943 operating against Allied forces involved in Operation Husky, the invasion of Sicily. On 11 July 1943 Flutto was on patrol in the Straits of Messina when she was detected and sunk by three British Motor Torpedo Boats (MTB’s 640, 651 and 670) with her entire crew of 49.
