= Black Swan-class sloop =

Ship class

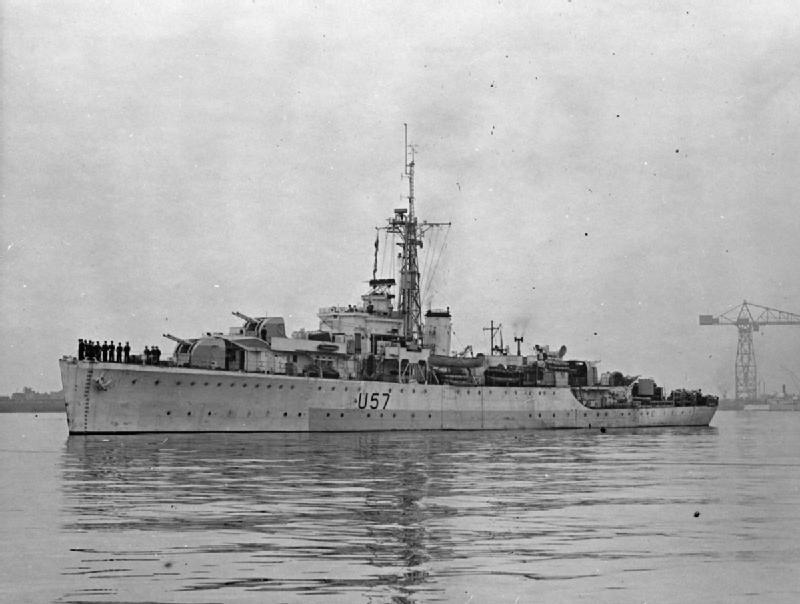
- HMS Black Swan in April 1945

Class overview
- Name: Black Swan class
- Operators: Royal Navy; Royal Indian Navy; German Navy; Indian Navy
- Preceded by: Egret class
- Built: 1938–1946
- In commission: 1939–1981
- Planned: 42
- Completed: 12 (original) + 25 (modified)
- Cancelled: 5
- Lost: 6
- Retired: 30

General characteristics
- Type: Sloop-of-war
- Displacement: 1,250 tons original; 1,350 tons modified
- Length: 299 ft 6 in (91.29 m)
- Beam: 37 ft 6 in (11.43 m) original; 38 ft 6 in (11.73 m) modified
- Draught: 11 ft (3.4 m)
- Propulsion: Geared turbines, 2 shafts: 3,600 hp (2.68 MW) (original); 4,300 hp (3.21 MW) (modified)
- Speed: 19.25 knots (36 km/h) (original); 20 knots (37 km/h) (modified)
- Range: 7,500 nmi (13,900 km) at 12 kn (22 km/h)
- Complement: 180 (original); 192 (modified)
- Armament: 6 × QF 4 in (102 mm) Mk XVI AA guns (3 × 2); 4 × 2-pounder AA pom-pom; 4 × 0.5-inch (12.7 mm) AA machine guns (original); 12 × 20 mm Oerlikon AA (6 × 2) (modified); Depth charges 40 (110 modified)

The Black Swan class and Modified Black Swan class were two classes of sloop of the Royal Navy and Royal Indian Navy. Twelve Black Swans were launched between 1939 and 1943, including four for the Royal Indian Navy; twenty-five Modified Black Swans were launched between 1942 and 1945, including two for the Royal Indian Navy; several other ships were cancelled.

== History ==
Like corvettes, sloops of that period were specialised convoy-defence vessels. Corvettes were based on a mercantile design with triple expansion engines, sloops were conventional naval vessels with turbines. Sloops were larger and faster with a heavy armament of high angle 4-inch guns which had superior anti-aircraft fire control via the Fuze Keeping Clock, while retaining excellent anti-submarine capability. They were designed to have a longer range than a destroyer at the expense of a lower top speed, while remaining capable of outrunning surfaced Type VII and Type IX U-boats.

In World War II, Black Swan-class sloops sank 29 U-boats. The most famous sloop commander was Captain Frederic John Walker. His sloop Starling became one of the most successful submarine hunters, taking part in the sinking of eleven U-boats. After the war, sloops continued in service with the Royal Navy, Egyptian Navy, Indian Navy, Pakistan Navy and the West German Navy. In April 1949, Amethyst was attacked on the Yangtze River by the Communist People's Liberation Army. Several Black Swan sloops fought in the Korean War.

== Black Swan class ==
=== Royal Navy ===
The first two ships were built under the 1937 Programme, being ordered from Yarrow and Company, Scotstoun, on 1 January 1938. The second pair was built under the 1939 Programme, being ordered from Furness Shipbuilding Company on 21 June 1939. A further ten RN ships were ordered under the 1940 War Programme on 13 April 1940; however six of these (the orders placed with White of Cowes, Thornycroft at Woolston, and Swan Hunter on Tyneside for two ships each) were subsequently replaced by orders for an equal number of Hunt-class escort destroyers.

There were incremental improvements as the building developed, and the Woodcock and Wren when completed were practically indistinguishable from the Modified Black Swan class.

List of Black Swan-class sloops of the Royal Navy
Name	Pennant	Builder	Laid Down	Launched	Commissioned	Fate
Flamingo	L18 later U18	Yarrow, Scotstoun	26 May 1938	18 April 1939	3 November 1939	Transferred to West Germany as Graf Spee 21 January 1959. Sold for breaking up 25 October 1967.
Black Swan	L57 later U57	Yarrow, Scotstoun	20 June 1938	7 July 1939	27 January 1940	Sold for breaking up 13 September 1956.
Erne	U03	Furness Sbdg, Haverton Hill-on-Tees	22 September 1939	5 August 1940	26 April 1941	Became RNVR training ship Wessex on the Solent 4 June 1952, broken up October 1965.
Ibis	U99	Furness Sbdg, Haverton Hill-on-Tees	22 September 1939	28 November 1940	30 August 1941	Sunk by Italian torpedo bombers off Algiers on 10 November 1942.
Whimbrel	U29	Yarrow, Scotstoun	31 October 1941	25 August 1942	13 January 1943	Transferred to Egypt as El Malek Farouq November 1949, renamed Tarik 1954.
Wild Goose	U45	Yarrow, Scotstoun	28 January 1942	14 October 1942	11 March 1943	Sold for breaking up 27 February 1956.
Woodpecker	U08	Denny, Dunbarton	23 February 1941	29 June 1942	14 December 1942	Sunk by U-256 on 27 February 1944.
Wren	U28	Denny, Dunbarton	27 February 1941	11 August 1942	4 February 1943	Sold for breaking up 2 February 1956.

=== Royal Indian Navy ===
Two ships were ordered under the 1939 Programme, the order being placed with Denny on 8 September 1939. The second pair were ordered under the 1940 Programme, this order with Thornycroft being placed on 29 August 1940. The first two were used as survey ships after the War. The second pair were transferred to the Pakistan Navy in 1948. The third pair (which were of the Modified Black Swan class – see below)

List of Black Swan-class sloops of the Royal Indian Navy
Name	Pennant	Builder	Laid Down	Launched	Commissioned	Fate
Sutlej	U95	Denny, Dunbarton	4 January 1940	1 October 1940	23 April 1941	Survey vessel 1955. Paid off at end 1978 and scrapped in 1980.
Jumna	U21	Denny, Dunbarton	28 February 1940	16 November 1940	13 May 1941	Survey vessel 1957. Renamed INS Jamuna 1968, paid off at end 1980 and broken up.
Narbada	U40	Thornycroft, Woolston	30 August 1941	21 November 1942	29 April 1943	Renamed Jhelum 1948. Sold to be broken up 15 July 1959.
Godavari	U52	Thornycroft, Woolston	30 October 1941	21 January 1943	28 June 1943	Renamed Sind 1948. Sold for breaking up 2 June 1959.

== Modified Black Swan class ==
=== Royal Navy ===
Fourteen sloops for the RN were in the 1940 Supplementary War Programme. The first two were ordered from Denny, Dunbarton, on 9 January 1941, ten more were ordered on 27 March 1941 (two each from Cammell Laird, Scotts, Thornycroft, Yarrow and John Brown), and a final pair from Fairfield, Govan, on 18 July 1941. The contract with John Brown was transferred to Devonport Dockyard on 3 March 1942, and then to Denny on 8 December 1942.

List of Modified Black Swan-class sloops of the Royal Navy (1940 programme)
Name	Pennant	Builder	Laid Down	Launched	Commissioned	Fate
Chanticleer	U05	Denny, Dunbarton	6 June 1941	24 September 1942	29 March 1943	Constructive total loss following torpedoing on 18 November 1943 by U-515 (Henke). Renamed Lusitania 31 December 1943 as a base ship, then broken up at Lisbon 1945.
Crane	U23	Denny, Dunbarton	13 June 1941	9 November 1942	10 May 1943	Broken up March 1965.
Cygnet	U38	Cammell Laird, Birkenhead	30 August 1941	28 July 1942	1 December 1942	Broken up 16 March 1956.
Kite	U87	Cammell Laird, Birkenhead	25 September 1941	13 October 1942	1 March 1943	Sunk by U-344 on 21 August 1944.
Lapwing	U62	Scotts, Greenock	17 December 1941	16 July 1943	21 March 1944	Sunk by U-968 on 20 March 1945 just outside Murmansk, USSR.
Lark	U11	Scotts, Greenock	5 May 1942	28 August 1943	10 April 1944	Constructive total loss following torpedoing by U-968 off Kola Inlet on 17 February 1945; salvaged by Soviet Navy and added as Neptun, finally broken up 1956.
Magpie	U82	Thornycroft, Woolston	30 December 1941	24 March 1943	30 August 1943	Broken up 12 July 1959.
Peacock	U96	Thornycroft, Woolston	29 November 1942	11 December 1943	10 May 1944	Broken up 7 May 1958.
Pheasant	U49	Yarrow, Scotstoun	17 March 1942	21 December 1942	12 May 1943	Broken up January 1963.
Redpole	U69	Yarrow, Scotstoun	18 May 1942	25 February 1943	24 June 1943	Broken up 20 November 1960.
Snipe	U20	Denny, Dunbarton	21 September 1944	20 December 1945	9 September 1946	Broken up 23 August 1960.
Sparrow	U71	Denny, Dunbarton	30 October 1944	18 February 1946	16 December 1946	Broken up 26 May 1958.
Starling	U66	Fairfield, Govan	21 October 1941	14 October 1942	1 April 1943	Broken up July 1965.
Woodcock	U90	Fairfield, Govan	21 October 1941	26 November 1942	29 May 1943	Sold for breaking up 28 November 1955.

Another fourteen ships were authorised in the 1941 Programme, but the last three ships (the names Star, Steady and Trial had been approved) were not ordered under this programme. The first of the eleven actually ordered was contracted with Thornycroft on 3 December 1941, with a further pair from Stephens, Linthouse, on 18 December. Eight more were ordered in 1942, two on 11 February, two on 3 March (originally from Portsmouth Dockyard), two on 12 August and two on 5 October. However the order for two sloops ordered at Portsmouth was moved to Chatham Dockyard on 21 June 1943, and they were laid down there, but were cancelled on 15 October 1945.

List of Modified Black Swan-class sloops of the Royal Navy (1941 programme)
Name	Pennant	Builder	Laid Down	Launched	Commissioned	Fate
Actaeon	U07	Thornycroft, Woolston	15 May 1944	25 July 1945	24 July 1946	Transferred to West Germany as Hipper 9 December 1958. Hulked July 1964, sold for breaking up 25 October 1967.
Amethyst	U16	Alex. Stephen, Linthouse	25 March 1942	7 May 1943	2 November 1943	Broken up 18 January 1957.
Hart	U58	Alex. Stephen, Linthouse	27 March 1942	7 July 1943	12 December 1943	Transferred to West Germany as Scheer 1958. Sold for breaking up 17 March 1971.
Hind	U39	Denny, Dunbarton	31 August 1942	30 September 1943	11 April 1944	Broken up 10 December 1958.
Mermaid	U30	Denny, Dunbarton	8 September 1942	11 November 1943	12 May 1944	Transferred to West Germany as Scharnhorst 5 May 1950. Hulked 1974, and broken up April 1990.
Alacrity	U60	Denny, Dunbarton	4 May 1943	1 September 1944	13 April 1945	Broken up 15 September 1956.
Opossum	U33	Denny, Dunbarton	28 July 1943	30 November 1944	16 June 1945	Broken up 26 April 1960.
Modeste	U42	Chatham Dockyard	15 February 1943	29 January 1944	3 September 1945	Broken up 11 March 1961.
Nereide	U64	Chatham Dockyard	15 February 1943	29 January 1944	6 May 1946	Broken up 18 May 1958.
Nonsuch	U54	Portsmouth Dockyard, later moved to Chatham Dockyard	26 February 1945	—N/a	—N/a	Cancelled 15 October 1945.
Nymphe	U84	Portsmouth Dockyard, later moved to Chatham Dockyard	26 February 1945	—N/a	—N/a	Cancelled 15 October 1945.

Two more sloops were authorised in the 1942 Programme; the names would have been Waterhen and Wryneck but they were never ordered in that year's Programme. The 1944 Programme re-instated these two vessels, as well as the twelfth sloop authorised under the 1941 Programme, and now named as Partridge. These three ships were ordered on 9 October 1944, but they were all cancelled on 15 October 1945. These had been intended to be further modified and enlarged, with a beam of 38 feet 6 inches (11.73 m). Two further ships planned under the 1944 Programme would have been named Woodpecker (ii) and Wild Swan, but these were never ordered and the intention to build was dropped when the 1945 Programme was compiled.

- Partridge, ordered from Thornycroft.
- Waterhen, ordered from Denny.
- Wryneck, ordered from Denny.

=== Royal Indian Navy ===
Two ships for the Indian Navy were included in the 1941 Programme, the order being placed with Yarrow on 10 September 1941.

List of Modified Black Swan-class sloops of the Royal Indian Navy
Name	Pennant	Builder	Laid Down	Launched	Commissioned	Fate
Kistna	U46	Yarrow, Scotstoun	14 July 1942	22 April 1943	26 August 1943	Renamed INS Krishna 1968. Paid off at end 1981 and broken up.
Cauvery	U10	Yarrow, Scotstoun	28 October 1942	15 June 1943	21 October 1943	Renamed INS Kaveri 1968. Sold 1979.

== Losses ==
In World War II

- Ibis was sunk by Italian torpedo bombers off Algiers on 10 November 1942
- Woodpecker was seriously damaged by an acoustic homing torpedo fired by U-256 on 20 February 1944 whilst escorting Convoy ON 224. The ship sank a week later on 27 February whilst under tow during an Atlantic storm.
- Kite was sunk by U-344 on 21 August 1944 whilst the ship was escorting aircraft carriers covering the Arctic convoy JW 59.
- Lark was damaged beyond repair by U-968 on 17 February 1945
- Lapwing was sunk by U-968 on 20 March 1945 just outside Murmansk, USSR.

== U-boat kills ==
- U-213 was sunk east of the Azores by Erne, Rochester and Sandwich on 31 July 1942.
- U-124 was sunk west of Porto by the corvette Stonecrop and Black Swan on 2 April 1943.
- U-202 was sunk at 00:30 hrs on 2 June 1943 south-east of Cape Farewell, Greenland, in position 56.12°N 39.52°W, by depth charges and gunfire from Starling on 2 June 1943.
- U-449 was sunk north-west of Cape Ortegal by Wren, Woodpecker, Kite and Wild Goose on 24 June 1943.
- U-462 was sunk in the Bay of Biscay by a Handley-Page Halifax and Wren, Kite, Woodpecker, Wild Goose and Woodcock on 30 July 1943.
- U-504 was sunk north-west of Cape Ortegal by Kite, Woodpecker, Wren and Wild Goose on 30 July 1943.
- U-226 was sunk east of Newfoundland by Starling, Woodcock and Kite on 6 November 1943.
- U-538 was sunk south-west of Ireland by the frigate Foley and Crane on 21 November 1943.
- U-119 was sunk in the Bay of Biscay by Starling on 24 June 1943.
- U-842 was sunk by Starling and Wild Goose on 6 November 1943.
- U-592 was sunk south-west of Ireland by Starling, Wild Goose and Magpie on 31 January 1944.
- U-762 was sunk by Woodpecker and Wild Goose on 8 February 1944.
- U-734 was sunk south-west of Ireland by Wild Goose and Starling on 9 February 1944.
- U-238 was sunk south-west of Ireland by Kite, Magpie and Starling on 9 February 1944.
- The Japanese submarine Ro-110 was depth charged and sunk east-south-east off Visakhapatnam, India by the Indian sloop HMIS Jumna and the Australian minesweepers HMAS Launceston and HMAS Ipswich on 11 - 12 February 1944.
- U-424 was sunk south-west of Ireland by Wild Goose and Woodpecker on 11 February 1944.
- U-264 was sunk by Woodpecker and Starling on 19 February 1944.
- U-653 was sunk by a Fairey Swordfish from the escort carrier Vindex, Starling and Wild Goose on 15 March 1944.
- U-961 was sunk east of Iceland by Starling on 29 March 1944.
- U-962 was sunk north-west of Cape Finisterre by Crane and Cygnet on 8 April 1944.
- U-473 was sunk south-west of Ireland by Starling, Wren and Wild Goose on 6 May 1944.
- U-333 was sunk west of the Scilly Isles by Starling and the frigate Loch Killin on 31 July 1944.
- U-608 was sunk in the Bay of Biscay by Wren and a B-24 Liberator on 10 August 1944.
- U-385 was sunk in the Bay of Biscay by Starling and a Short Sunderland on 11 August 1944.
- U-198 was sunk near the Seychelles by the frigate Findhorn and HMIS Godavari on 12 August 1944.
- U-354 was sunk in the Barents Sea by Mermaid and Peacock, the frigate Loch Dunvegan and the destroyer Keppel on 24 August 1944.
- U-394 was sunk in the Norwegian Sea by a Fairey Swordfish from the escort carrier Vindex, the destroyers Keppel and Whitehall and the sloops Mermaid and Peacock on 2 September 1944.
- U-425 was sunk in the Barents Sea by Lark and the corvette Alnwick Castle on 17 February 1945.
- U-1276 was sunk south of Waterford by Amethyst on 20 February 1945.
- U-1208 was sunk by Amethyst and others on 20 February 1945.
- U-327 was sunk in the English Channel by the frigates Labuan and Loch Fada and Wild Goose on 27 February 1945.
- U-683 was sunk by Wild Goose and others on 12 March 1945.

=== Reassessment ===
- U-482 was credited during the war to the Starling, along with the sloops Amethyst, Peacock, Hart, and frigate Loch Craggie, as having been sunk in the North Channel on 16 January 1945. The Admiralty withdrew this credit in a post-war reassessment in the 1990s.

== See also ==
- List of ship classes of World War II
- Black Swan-class sloop (2012)

== Bibliography ==
- Blair, Clay (2000). Hitler's U-Boat War: The Hunted 1942–1945. New York: Modern Library. ISBN 0-679-64033-9.
- Hague, Arnold (1993). Sloops: A History of the 71 Sloops Built in Britain and Australia for the British, Australian and Indian Navies 1926–1946. Kendal, England: World Ship Society. ISBN 0-905617-67-3.
