= HMS Modeste (U42) =

Modified Black Swan-class sloop

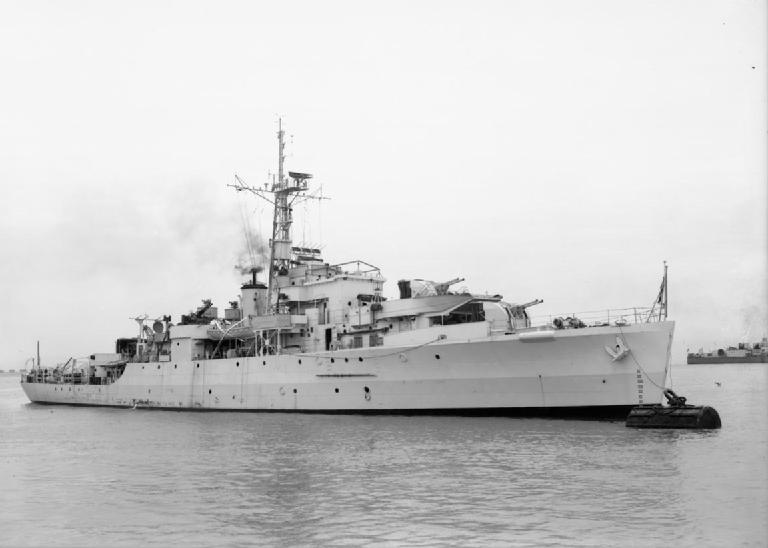
- HMS Modeste anchored on 12 September 1945.

History

United Kingdom
- Name: Modeste
- Namesake: Modeste
- Ordered: 5 October 1942
- Builder: Chatham Dockyard, Kent
- Laid down: 15 February 1943
- Launched: 29 January 1944
- Commissioned: 3 September 1945
- Decommissioned: 1950s
- Identification: Pennant number: U42 / F42
- Fate: Scrapped in 1961

General characteristics
- Class & type: Modified Black Swan-class sloop
- Displacement: 1,350–1,490 long tons (1,370–1,510 t) standard
- Length: 266 ft 6 in (81.23 m)
- Beam: 38 ft 6 in (11.73 m)
- Draft: 11 ft 4 in (3.45 m)
- Propulsion: Geared turbines; two shafts
- Speed: 20 knots (37 km/h) at 4,300 hp (3,200 kW)
- Complement: 192 men
- Armament: 6 × QF 4 in Mk XVI anti-aircraft guns; 6 × 40 mm Bofors gun anti-aircraft guns

HMS Modeste was a modified Black Swan-class sloop of the British Royal Navy. She was built by Chatham Dockyard, during the Second World War, being launched on 29 January 1944 and commissioned on 3 September 1945. Post war, Modeste served with the British Far East Fleet, and took part in the Suez Crisis. She was paid off into reserve for the last time in 1958 and scrapped in 1961.

== Construction and design ==
On 5 October 1942, the British Admiralty ordered two Modified Black Swan-class sloops from Chatham Dockyard, Modeste and Nereide, as part of the 1941 construction programme for the Royal Navy. Modeste was laid down on 15 February 1943, was launched on 29 January 1944 and completed on 3 September 1945, receiving the Pennant number U42, which changed to F42 in 1947 when Modeste, like all escort vessels, was redesignated a frigate.

Modeste was 299 ft 6 in (91.29 m) long overall and 283 ft 0 in (86.26 m) between perpendiculars, with a beam of 38 feet 6 inches (11.73 m) and a draught of 11 ft 4 in (3.45 m) at deep load. Displacement of the Modified Black Swans was 1,350–1,490 long tons (1,370–1,510 t) standard and 1,880–1,950 long tons (1,910–1,980 t) deep load depending on the armament and equipment fitted. Two Admiralty three-drum water-tube boilers provided steam to Parsons geared steam turbines which drove two shafts. The machinery was rated at 4,300 shp (3,200 kW), giving a speed of 19.75 kn (22.73 mph; 36.58 km/h).

The ship's main gun armament (as fitted to all the Modified Black Swans) consisted of 3 twin QF 4 inch (102 mm) Mk XVI guns, in dual purpose mounts, capable of both anti-ship and anti-aircraft use. Close-in anti-aircraft armament varied between the ships of the class, with Modeste completing with an outfit of 2 twin and 2 single 40 mm Bofors guns, with two more 40 mm Bofors added by the end of 1952. Anti-submarine armament consisted of a split Hedgehog anti-submarine mortar, mounted either side of the 'B' 4-inch mount, together with 110 depth charges. The Modified Black Swans had a crew of 192 officers and other ranks.

== Service ==
The end of the Second World War, and post-war manpower restrictions meant that Modeste was initially limited to second-line tasks, being attached to the shore establishment HMS Excellent at Portsmouth as gunnery training ship in February 1946, before transferring to the shore establishment HMS Vernon, also at Portsmouth, for use as an accommodation ship for Sea Cadets. On 15 April 1947, Modeste and the sloop Fleetwood went to the aid of the Panamanian ship Georgie, which had run aground off St Catherine's Point, Isle of Wight. In 1950, Modeste was laid up in reserve at Portsmouth.

Modeste was refitted at Portsmouth late in 1952, in preparation for returning to active service, leaving Britain in January 1953 for service with the 3rd Frigate Squadron of the Far East Fleet, replacing Alacrity. Modeste served off Korea during the Korean War from April 1953 until the end of the war in July that year. In late 1956, Modeste was ordered to the Gulf of Suez during the Suez Crisis. Modeste returned to Portsmouth on 22 September 1958, paying off into reserve, having completed four full commissions at part of the 3rd Frigate Squadron.

Modeste was transferred to BISCO for disposal on 8 March 1961, and arrived at J. A. White's yard at St Davids on Forth for scrapping on 11 March 1961.
