= German submarine U-344 =

German World War II submarine

Coordinates: 74°54′N 15°26′E

History

Nazi Germany
- Name: U-344
- Ordered: 20 January 1941
- Builder: Nordseewerke, Emden
- Yard number: 216
- Laid down: 7 May 1942
- Launched: 29 January 1943
- Commissioned: 26 March 1943
- Fate: Sunk on 22 August 1944

General characteristics
- Class & type: Type VIIC submarine
- Displacement: 769 tonnes (757 long tons) surfaced; 871 t (857 long tons) submerged
- Length: 67.10 m (220 ft 2 in) o/a; 50.50 m (165 ft 8 in) pressure hull
- Beam: 6.20 m (20 ft 4 in) o/a; 4.70 m (15 ft 5 in) pressure hull
- Height: 9.60 m (31 ft 6 in)
- Draught: 4.74 m (15 ft 7 in)
- Installed power: 2,800–3,200 PS (2,100–2,400 kW; 2,800–3,200 bhp) (diesels); 750 PS (550 kW; 740 shp) (electric)
- Propulsion: 2 shafts; 2 × diesel engines; 2 × electric motors
- Speed: 17.7 knots (32.8 km/h; 20.4 mph) surfaced; 7.6 knots (14.1 km/h; 8.7 mph) submerged
- Range: 8,500 nmi (15,700 km; 9,800 mi) at 10 knots (19 km/h; 12 mph) surfaced; 80 nmi (150 km; 92 mi) at 4 knots (7.4 km/h; 4.6 mph) submerged
- Test depth: 230 m (750 ft); Crush depth: 250–295 m (820–968 ft)
- Complement: 4 officers, 40–56 enlisted
- Armament: 5 × 53.3 cm (21 in) torpedo tubes (four bow, one stern); 14 × torpedoes or 26 TMA mines; 1 × 8.8 cm (3.46 in) deck gun (220 rounds); 2 × twin 2 cm (0.79 in) C/30 anti-aircraft guns

Service record
- Part of: 8th U-boat Flotilla; 26 March 1943 – 31 March 1944; 3rd U-boat Flotilla; 1 April – 31 May 1944; 11th U-boat Flotilla; 1 June – 22 August 1944
- Identification codes: M 50 920
- Commanders: Kptlt. Ulrich Pietsch; 26 March 1943 – 22 August 1944
- Operations: 3 patrols: 1st patrol: 20 – 27 May 1944; 2nd patrol: 31 May – 8 July 1944; 3rd patrol: 3 – 22 August 1944
- Victories: 1 warship sunk (1,350 tons)

German submarine U-344 was a Type VIIC U-boat of Nazi Germany's Kriegsmarine during World War II.

She was a member of two wolfpacks.

She was on her third patrol when she was sunk by a British aircraft on 22 August 1944.

She sank one warship.

== Design ==
German Type VIIC submarines were preceded by the shorter Type VIIB submarines. U-344 had a displacement of 769 tonnes (757 long tons) when at the surface and 871 tonnes (857 long tons) while submerged. She had a total length of 67.10 m (220 ft 2 in), a pressure hull length of 50.50 m (165 ft 8 in), a beam of 6.20 m (20 ft 4 in), a height of 9.60 m (31 ft 6 in), and a draught of 4.74 m (15 ft 7 in). The submarine was powered by two Germaniawerft F46 four-stroke, six-cylinder supercharged diesel engines producing a total of 2,800 to 3,200 metric horsepower (2,060 to 2,350 kW; 2,760 to 3,160 shp) for use while surfaced, two AEG GU 460/8–27 double-acting electric motors producing a total of 750 metric horsepower (550 kW; 740 shp) for use while submerged. She had two shafts and two 1.23 m (4 ft) propellers. The boat was capable of operating at depths of up to 230 metres (750 ft).

The submarine had a maximum surface speed of 17.7 knots (32.8 km/h; 20.4 mph) and a maximum submerged speed of 7.6 knots (14.1 km/h; 8.7 mph). When submerged, the boat could operate for 80 nautical miles (150 km; 92 mi) at 4 knots (7.4 km/h; 4.6 mph); when surfaced, she could travel 8,500 nautical miles (15,700 km; 9,800 mi) at 10 knots (19 km/h; 12 mph). U-344 was fitted with five 53.3 cm (21 in) torpedo tubes (four fitted at the bow and one at the stern), fourteen torpedoes, one 8.8 cm (3.46 in) SK C/35 naval gun, 220 rounds, and two twin 2 cm (0.79 in) C/30 anti-aircraft guns. The boat had a complement of between forty-four and sixty.

== Service history ==
The submarine was laid down on 7 May 1942 at the Nordseewerke yard at Emden as yard number 216, launched on 29 January 1943 and commissioned on 26 March under the command of Kapitänleutnant Ulrich Pietsch.

U-344 served with the 8th U-boat Flotilla, for training and the 3rd flotilla for operations from 1 April 1944. She was reassigned to the 11th flotilla on 1 June 1944.

=== First patrol ===
U-344 had sailed from Kiel in Germany to Flekkefjord (west of Kristiansand) and then Bergen in Norway in April and May 1944, but her first patrol began when she departed Bergen on 20 May and followed the Norwegian coastline. She arrived at Narvik on the 27th.

=== Second patrol ===
Her second foray involved criss-crossing the Norwegian Sea. At one point she passed east of Jan Mayen Island. She arrived at Bogenbucht (west of Narvik) on 8 July 1944.

=== Third patrol and loss ===
Having departed Bogenbucht on 3 August 1944, she sank the British sloop HMS Kite in the Barents Sea on the 21st. Of 226 crew, nine men survived the icy water. The next day, a British Fairey Swordfish of 825 Naval Air Squadron from HMS Vindex, dropped a pattern of depth charges on the U-boat, sinking her. Fifty men died in the sinking; there were no survivors.

=== Previously recorded fate ===
U-344 was thought to have been sunk on 24 August 1944 in the Barents Sea off the North Cape by British warships: i.e. the sloops HMS Mermaid and Peacock, the frigate HMS Loch Dunvegan and the destroyer Keppel. U-354 was the victim.

=== Wolfpacks ===
U-344 took part in two wolfpacks, namely:

- Trutz (2 June – 6 July 1944)
- Trutz (17 – 22 August 1944)

== Summary of raiding history ==
Date	Ship Name	Tonnage (Note: Merchant ship tonnages are in gross register tons. Military vessels are listed by tons displacement.)	Nationality	Fate
21 August 1944	HMS Kite	1,350	Royal Navy	Sunk

== Bibliography ==
- Busch, Rainer; Röll, Hans-Joachim (1999). German U-boat commanders of World War II : a biographical dictionary. Translated by Brooks, Geoffrey. London, Annapolis, Md: Greenhill Books, Naval Institute Press. ISBN 1-55750-186-6.
- Busch, Rainer; Röll, Hans-Joachim (1999). Deutsche U-Boot-Verluste von September 1939 bis Mai 1945 [German U-boat losses from September 1939 to May 1945]. Der U-Boot-Krieg (in German). Vol. IV. Hamburg, Berlin, Bonn: Mittler. ISBN 3-8132-0514-2.
- Gröner, Erich; Jung, Dieter; Maass, Martin (1991). U-boats and Mine Warfare Vessels. German Warships 1815–1945. Vol. 2. Translated by Thomas, Keith; Magowan, Rachel. London: Conway Maritime Press. ISBN 0-85177-593-4.
- Kemp, Paul (1999). U-Boats Destroyed – German Submarine Losses in the World Wars. London: Arms & Armour. ISBN 1-85409-515-3.
