= HMS Crane (U23) =

Modified Black Swan-class sloop

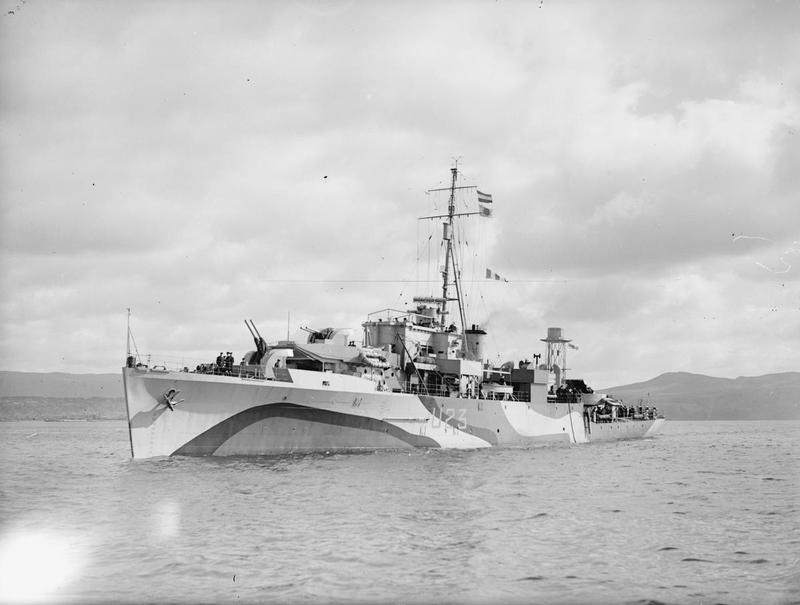
- HMS Crane at Greenock on 6 May 1943.

History

United Kingdom
- Name: Crane
- Namesake: Crane
- Ordered: 9 January 1941
- Builder: William Denny and Brothers, Dumbarton
- Laid down: 13 June 1941
- Launched: 9 November 1942
- Commissioned: 10 May 1943
- Identification: Pennant number: U23
- Fate: Scrapped in 1965

General characteristics
- Class & type: Modified Black Swan-class sloop
- Displacement: 1,350 tons
- Length: 283 ft (86 m)
- Beam: 38.5 ft (11.7 m)
- Propulsion: Geared turbines; two shafts
- Speed: 20 knots (37 km/h; 23 mph) at 4,300 hp (3,200 kW)
- Complement: 192 men + 1 cat
- Armament: 6 × QF 4 in Mk XVI anti-aircraft guns; 12 × 20 mm anti-aircraft guns

HMS Crane was a modified Black Swan-class sloop of the Royal Navy. She was laid down by William Denny and Brothers, Dumbarton on 13 June 1941, launched on 9 November 1942 and commissioned on 10 May 1943, with the pennant number U23. She saw active service during the Second World War, initially performing convoy escort roles in the Atlantic before supporting the Normandy landings. In the final months of the war, Crane joined the British Pacific Fleet and saw service during the Battle of Okinawa. Post-war, Crane remained in south-east Asia and took part in hostilities during the Korean War. She was redeployed to the Middle East during the Suez Crisis before returning to Asia for service during the Malayan Emergency. Crane was withdrawn from service in the early 1960s and was scrapped in 1965.

== Design ==
Crane was one of two Modified Black Swan-class sloops ordered by the Admiralty on 9 January 1941. The Modified Black Swans were an improved version of the pre-war Black Swan-class sloops, with greater beam, allowing a heavier close-in anti-aircraft armament to be accommodated.

Crane was 299 ft 6 in (91.29 m) long overall and 283 ft 0 in (86.26 m) between perpendiculars, with a beam of 38 feet 6 inches (11.73 m) and a draught of 11 ft 4 in (3.45 m) at deep load. Displacement of the Modified Black Swans was 1,350–1,490 long tons (1,370–1,510 t) standard and 1,880–1,950 long tons (1,910–1,980 t) deep load depending on the armament and equipment fitted. Two Admiralty three-drum water-tube boilers provided steam to Parsons geared steam turbines which drove two shafts. The machinery was rated at 4,300 shaft horsepower (3,200 kW), giving a speed of 19.75 knots (36.58 km/h; 22.73 mph).

The ship's main gun armament (as fitted to all the Modified Black Swans) consisted of three twin QF 4-inch (102 mm) Mk XVI guns, in dual purpose mounts, capable of both anti-ship and anti-aircraft use. Crane completed with a close-in anti-aircraft armament of 4 twin and 2 single Oerlikon 20 mm cannon. Anti-submarine armament consisted of eight depth charge throwers and two rails, with 110 depth charges carried.

Crane's close-in armament was modified during the war to 2 twin Bofors 40 mm guns and 1 twin and two single Oerlikon 20 mm cannon. Post-war, the ship's remaining 20 mm guns were replaced by 4 single Bofors guns, while a split Hedgehog anti submarine mortar was fitted.

== Construction and career ==
HMS Crane was laid down at William Denny and Brothers' Dumbarton shipyard on 13 June 1941 and was launched on 9 November 1942 and was completed on 10 May 1943, with the pennant number U23.

After commissioning she joined the 7th Escort Group based at Greenock in Scotland, with other members including sister ships Chanticleer and Cygnet and to be later joined by Hart and Pheasant. Duties included the escort and support of convoys in the North Atlantic and to Gibraltar. In July 1943, Crane took part in Operation Husky, the Anglo-American invasion of Sicily, escorting an assault convoy from Britain to the Mediterranean from 28 June to 7 July, and then a second assault convoy to the beaches on 13 July. In August 1943, in order to avoid attacks by aircraft of RAF Coastal Command in the Bay of Biscay, German U-boats on course for the north Atlantic started to hug the coast of France and Northern Spain. As a response, the Royal Navy deployed Escort groups to patrol off Cape Finisterre to stop the Germans from using this route, but German air attacks forced the patrols to move further west, where they were less effective. Crane was briefly deployed in one of these groups in September 1943, but saw no success.

On 13 November 1943 Convoy MKS 30 left Gibraltar from Britain, joining up with Convoy SL 139, Britain-bound from West Africa the next day, with the 7th Escort Group, including Crane, ordered to reinforce the convoy, while the Germans formed three patrol lines of submarines to attack the convoy. On 18 December, Crane and Chanticleer attacked the submarine U-515, with U-515 firing a T5 acoustic homing torpedo which hit and damaged Chanticleer, which had to be towed to port in the Azores. Crane continued to attack U-515 with depth charges for 10 hours, damaging the submarine and driving U-515 off. German attacks on the convoy continued, and on 21 November 1943 Crane and the frigate Fowey sank U-538 with depth charges. There were no survivors from the submarine.

Crane and Cygnet depth charged and sank the German submarine U-962 on 8 April 1944 in the North Atlantic northwest of Cape Finisterre. In May 1944, the 7th Escort Group, including Crane she was transferred to the English Channel to support the Allies planned Normandy landings for Operation Neptune. On 6 June Crane formed part of the escort of an assault convoy to Gold Beach. In August 1944, she was released from support duties in the Channel and sent for refit at Hull, but while on passage to Hull, collided with the merchant steamer Tilapia, sustaining structural damage. The refit and repairs continued until November 1944.

At the end of the work, she was transferred for service with the British Pacific Fleet, arriving in Sydney on 17 February 1945 and joining the fleet at Manus Island on 4 March 1945. Crane was employed in escorting the replenishment ships of the fleet train supporting the carriers of the fleet, supporting operations against Japanese airbases during the Battle of Okinawa in March–May 1945 She continued to protect replenishment ships in support of the British Pacific fleet until the end of the war, Crane was present in Tokyo Bay on 2 September 1945 during the signing of Japan's surrender. She was deployed on a Hong Kong-based patrol until refitted at Brisbane, Australia from October 1945 to January 1946.

Following completion of the refit, the ship was assigned to the 3rd Frigate Flotilla. She collided with the destroyer Cockade on 23 April 1946, and on 1 July 1946, she set out on her return journey to Britain. Upon arrival in England, she was reduced to reserve status in Harwich, transferring to the Chatham Reserve Fleet in 1948.

Following a refit during which Hedgehog was fitted and the ship's anti-aircraft outfit upgraded, Crane returned to active service in August 1951, joining the 3rd Frigate Squadron in the Far East. She was the leader of the squadron, and served on blockade and bombardment duties off the west coast of Korea during the Korean War, firing 1756 rounds of 4-inch ammunition during the war. Crane was refitted in Hong Kong in February 1952. On 27 March 1952, Crane was hit by a shell from a North Korean shore battery off He Do Island. Crane was not seriously damaged and suffered no casualties.

In 1956 she was deployed to the Red Sea during the Suez Crisis. While there, she was attacked by five Israeli Air Force Dassault Mystère IV fighter aircraft after supposedly being mistaken for an Egyptian warship. Crane was hit by rocket fire from the aircraft and small bombs which exploded around the stern, spraying the ship with shrapnel. The attack inflicted widespread damage on the hull, damaging two antiaircraft guns, destroying a depth charge thrower, and cutting various electrical circuits and water mains, but damage was limited as the rockets were impact-fused and did not penetrate deep into the ship's hull. The ship's fighting efficiency was only slightly impaired. Three crewmen were wounded in the attack. Crane claimed to have shot down one of the Israeli fighters. She was then refitted at Singapore, being modernised and having her accommodation improved, returning to service in January 1958. Duties included shelling Malayan National Liberation Army targets in South Malaya during the Malayan Emergency as well as fishery protection patrols off Hong Kong and training. She continued to serve in the Far East until 1962, the last of her class in service with the Royal Navy.

The ship was paid off at the end of 1962 at Portsmouth, and was transferred to BISCO for disposal in 1965, being scrapped at the Queenborough, Kent yard of Lacmots Ltd from March 1965.

== Legacy ==
The ship bell is placed in the foyer of Tower Hamlets Town Hall. The ship was adopted by the old Metropolitan Borough of Bethnal Green during the Second World War and the connection with the ship and its crew was maintained after the borough of Bethnal Green merged with neighbours to form the new London Borough of Tower Hamlets in 1965.
