= HMS Opossum (U33) =

Modified Black Swan-class sloop

History

United Kingdom
- Name: Opossum
- Namesake: Opossum
- Ordered: 12 August 1941
- Builder: William Denny and Brothers, Dumbarton
- Laid down: 28 July 1943
- Launched: 30 November 1944
- Commissioned: 16 June 1945
- Decommissioned: 1950s
- Identification: Pennant number: U33
- Fate: Scrapped in 1960

General characteristics
- Class & type: Modified Black Swan-class sloop
- Displacement: 1,350 tons
- Length: 283 ft (86 m)
- Beam: 38.5 ft (11.7 m)
- Propulsion: Geared turbines; two shafts
- Speed: 20 knots (37 km/h) at 4,300 hp (3,200 kW)
- Complement: 192 men + 1 Cat
- Armament: 6 × QF 4 in Mk XVI anti-aircraft guns; 12 × 20 mm anti-aircraft guns

HMS Opossum was a modified Black Swan-class sloop of the Royal Navy. She was laid down by William Denny and Brothers, Dumbarton on 28 July 1943, launched on 30 November 1944 and commissioned on 16 June 1945, with the pennant number U33.

== Construction and design ==
Opossum was one of two Modified-Black Swan-class sloops ordered by the British Admiralty from the Scottish shipbuilder William Denny and Brothers on 12 August 1942 as part of the 1941 shipbuilding programme for the Royal Navy. (Note: A total of 14 Modified-Black Swans were authorised under the 1941 programme, although in the end only 9 of the 14 were completed, with two cancelled during construction, and work on the final three ships not started.) The ship was laid down at Denny's Dunbarton shipyard on 28 July 1943, was launched on 30 November 1944, and completed on 16 June 1945 as the fifth ship with the name Opossum to join the Royal Navy.

Opossum was 299 ft 6 in (91.29 m) long overall and 283 ft 0 in (86.26 m) between perpendiculars, with a beam of 38 feet 6 inches (11.73 m) and a draught of 11 ft 4 in (3.45 m) at deep load. Displacement of the Modified Black Swans was 1,350–1,490 long tons (1,370–1,510 t) standard and 1,880–1,950 long tons (1,910–1,980 t) deep load depending on the armament and equipment fitted. Two Admiralty three-drum water-tube boilers provided steam to Parsons geared steam turbines which drove two shafts. The machinery was rated at 4,300 shp (3,200 kW), giving a speed of 19.75 kn (22.73 mph; 36.58 km/h).

The ship's main gun armament (as fitted to all the Modified Black Swans) consisted of 3 twin QF 4 inch (102 mm) Mk XVI guns, in dual purpose mounts, capable of both anti-ship and anti-aircraft use. Close-in anti-aircraft armament varied between the ships of the class, with Opossum completing with an outfit of 2 twin 40 mm Bofors guns and two twin and two single Oerlikon 20 mm cannon. Anti-submarine armament consisted of 110 depth charges. Post war, Opossum's close-in armament was revised to 2 twin and 2 single Bofors guns, and a Hedgehog anti-submarine mortar was added. The ship had a crew of 192 officers and other ranks.

== Service ==
After working up, Opossum was sent to the Far East, and had joined the British Pacific Fleet by August 1945. The sloop was deployed on patrol duties based out of Hong Kong, and on 10 May 1946, when on passage to Australia from Hong Kong, rescued eight survivors from a RAAF Liberator which had crashed 75 nautical miles (86 mi; 139 km) south of Mindanao the day before. Two people were killed in the crash. After a refit at Sydney in mid 1946, Opossum returned to service with the 1st Escort Flotilla of the British Pacific Fleet. In 1947, Opossum, like all sloops, was given a new pennant number, changing to F33. In late 1947, Opossum returned to Britain, arriving at Portsmouth on 17 November and going into reserve there.

In early 1952, Opossum was refitted at Chatham before returning to active service, joining the 3rd Frigate Squadron based in the Far East in May 1952. In August 1952, Opossum was patrolling off Borneo, and in September 1952 took part in Operation Full Back, a two-day exercise testing the defences of Singapore against attacks by small boats or divers. Opossum took part in the Korean War. On 16 January 1953, Opossum shelled targets near Haeju, and on 10 February 1953, together with sister ship Crane and the New Zealand frigate Hawea took part in a search for a suspected enemy submarine. Opossum also took part in the Malayan Emergency. On 8 July 1954, Opossum and the New Zealand frigate Pukaki shelled suspected Communist targets in Labu, Negeri Sembilan. On 27 June 1957, Opossum recommissioned at Singapore with a new crew. Opossum left the 3rd Frigate Squadron late in 1957, and arrived back in Britain in January 1958. Opossum then joined the 7th Frigate Squadron, serving on the South Atlantic Station before being paid off into reserve at Devonport in 1959. She was soon sold for scrap, arriving at the breakers yard on 26 April 1960.

== Bibliography ==
- Colledge, J. J.; Warlow, Ben (2006) [1969]. Ships of the Royal Navy: The Complete Record of All Fighting Ships of the Royal Navy from the 15th Century to the Present (3rd Rev ed.). London: Chatham Publishing. ISBN 978-1-86176-281-8. OCLC 67375475.
- Critchley, Mike (1992). British Warships Since 1945: Part 5: Frigates. Liskeard, UK: Maritime Press. ISBN 0-907771-13-0.
- Friedman, Norman (2008). British Destroyers and Frigates: The Second World War and After. Barnsley, UK: Seaforth Publishing. ISBN 978-1-84832-015-4.
- Gardiner, Robert; Chesneau, Roger, eds. (1980). Conway's All The World's Fighting Ships 1922–1946. London: Conway Maritime Press. ISBN 0-85177-146-7.
- Hague, Arnold (1993). Sloops: A History of the 71 Sloops Built in Britain and Australia for the British, Australian and Indian Navies 1926–1946. Kendal, England: World Ship Society. ISBN 0-905617-67-3.
- Hobbs, David (2017). The British Pacific Fleet: The Royal Navy's Most Powerful Strike Force. Barnsley, UK: Seaforth Publishing. ISBN 978-1-5267-0283-8.
