= German submarine U-394 =

German world war II submarine

Coordinates: 69.7833°N 4.1667°E

History

Nazi Germany
- Name: U-394
- Ordered: 20 January 1941
- Builder: Howaldtswerke, Kiel
- Yard number: 26
- Laid down: 31 March 1942
- Launched: 19 June 1943
- Commissioned: 7 August 1943
- Fate: Sunk, 2 September 1944

General characteristics
- Class & type: Type VIIC submarine
- Displacement: 769 tonnes (757 long tons) surfaced; 871 t (857 long tons) submerged
- Length: 67.10 m (220 ft 2 in) o/a; 50.50 m (165 ft 8 in) pressure hull
- Beam: 6.20 m (20 ft 4 in) o/a; 4.70 m (15 ft 5 in) pressure hull
- Height: 9.60 m (31 ft 6 in)
- Draught: 4.74 m (15 ft 7 in)
- Installed power: 2,800–3,200 PS (2,100–2,400 kW; 2,800–3,200 bhp) (diesels); 750 PS (550 kW; 740 shp) (electric)
- Propulsion: 2 shafts; 2 × diesel engines; 2 × electric motors
- Speed: 17.7 knots (32.8 km/h; 20.4 mph) surfaced; 7.6 knots (14.1 km/h; 8.7 mph) submerged
- Range: 8,500 nmi (15,700 km; 9,800 mi) at 10 knots (19 km/h; 12 mph) surfaced; 80 nmi (150 km; 92 mi) at 4 knots (7.4 km/h; 4.6 mph) submerged
- Test depth: 230 m (750 ft); Crush depth: 250–295 m (820–968 ft)
- Complement: 4 officers, 40–56 enlisted
- Armament: 5 × 53.3 cm (21 in) torpedo tubes (four bow, one stern); 14 × torpedoes; 1 × 3.7 cm (1.5 in) Flak M42 AA gun; 2 × twin 2 cm (0.79 in) C/30 anti-aircraft guns

Service record
- Part of: 5th U-boat Flotilla; 7 August 1943 – 31 March 1944; 1st U-boat Flotilla; 1 April – 31 May 1944; 11th U-boat Flotilla; 1 June – 2 September 1944
- Identification codes: M 53 379
- Commanders: Oblt.z.S. Ernst-Günther Unterhorst; 7 – 18 August 1943; Kptlt. Wolfgang Borger; 19 August 1943 – 2 September 1944
- Operations: 2 patrols: 1st patrol: 1 June – 8 July 1944; 2nd patrol: 27 July – 2 September 1944
- Victories: None

German submarine U-394 was a Type VIIC U-boat of Nazi Germany's Kriegsmarine during World War II.

She carried out two patrols. She did not sink or damage any ships.

She was sunk by a British aircraft and warships in the Norwegian Sea on 2 September 1944.

== Design ==
German Type VIIC submarines were preceded by the shorter Type VIIB submarines. U-394 had a displacement of 769 tonnes (757 long tons) when at the surface and 871 tonnes (857 long tons) while submerged. She had a total length of 67.10 m (220 ft 2 in), a pressure hull length of 50.50 m (165 ft 8 in), a beam of 6.20 m (20 ft 4 in), a height of 9.60 m (31 ft 6 in), and a draught of 4.74 m (15 ft 7 in). The submarine was powered by two Germaniawerft F46 four-stroke, six-cylinder supercharged diesel engines producing a total of 2,800 to 3,200 metric horsepower (2,060 to 2,350 kW; 2,760 to 3,160 shp) for use while surfaced, two Garbe, Lahmeyer & Co. RP 137/c double-acting electric motors producing a total of 750 metric horsepower (550 kW; 740 shp) for use while submerged. She had two shafts and two 1.23 m (4 ft) propellers. The boat was capable of operating at depths of up to 230 metres (750 ft).

The submarine had a maximum surface speed of 17.7 knots (32.8 km/h; 20.4 mph) and a maximum submerged speed of 7.6 knots (14.1 km/h; 8.7 mph). When submerged, the boat could operate for 80 nautical miles (150 km; 92 mi) at 4 knots (7.4 km/h; 4.6 mph); when surfaced, she could travel 8,500 nautical miles (15,700 km; 9,800 mi) at 10 knots (19 km/h; 12 mph). U-394 was fitted with five 53.3 cm (21 in) torpedo tubes (four fitted at the bow and one at the stern), fourteen torpedoes, one 3.7 cm (1.5 in) Flak M42 and two twin 2 cm (0.79 in) C/30 anti-aircraft guns. The boat had a complement of between forty-four and sixty.

== Service history ==
The submarine was laid down on 31 January 1941 at the Howaldtswerke (yard) at Flensburg as yard number 26, launched on 19 June 1943 and commissioned on 7 August under the command of Oberleutnant zur See Ernst-Günther Unterhorst.

The boat was a member of two wolfpacks.

She served with the 5th U-boat Flotilla from 7 August 1943 and the 1st flotilla from 1 April 1944. She was reassigned to the 11th flotilla on 1 June.

Her first patrol was preceded by a series of short journey from Kiel in Germany to Arendal (northeast of Kristiansand), Bergen and Narvik in Norway.

=== First patrol ===
The boat departed Narvik on 1 June 1944. She was soon sweeping the Norwegian Sea between Jan Mayen island and the Norwegian mainland. She arrived at Hammerfest on 8 July.

=== Second patrol and loss ===
U-394 left Hammerfest on 27 July 1944. She patrolled the Greenland and Barents seas. On 2 September, southeast of Jan Mayen, she was sunk by rockets and depth charges from a Fairey Swordfish of 825 Naval Air Squadron (this aircraft was from the escort carrier HMS Vindex), the British destroyers HMS Keppel and HMS Whitehall. The sloops HMS Mermaid and HMS Peacock were also involved.

50 men died in the U-boat; there were no survivors.

=== Wolfpacks ===
U-394 took part in two wolfpacks, namely:

- Trutz (2 June – 6 July 1944)
- Trutz (17 August – 2 September 1944)

== Bibliography ==
- Busch, Rainer; Röll, Hans-Joachim (1999). German U-boat commanders of World War II : a biographical dictionary. Translated by Brooks, Geoffrey. London, Annapolis, Md: Greenhill Books, Naval Institute Press. ISBN 1-55750-186-6.
- Busch, Rainer; Röll, Hans-Joachim (1999). Deutsche U-Boot-Verluste von September 1939 bis Mai 1945 [German U-boat losses from September 1939 to May 1945]. Der U-Boot-Krieg (in German). Vol. IV. Hamburg, Berlin, Bonn: Mittler. ISBN 3-8132-0514-2.
- Gröner, Erich; Jung, Dieter; Maass, Martin (1991). U-boats and Mine Warfare Vessels. German Warships 1815–1945. Vol. 2. Translated by Thomas, Keith; Magowan, Rachel. London: Conway Maritime Press. ISBN 0-85177-593-4.
