= HMS Mermaid (U30) =

Sloop of the Royal Navy

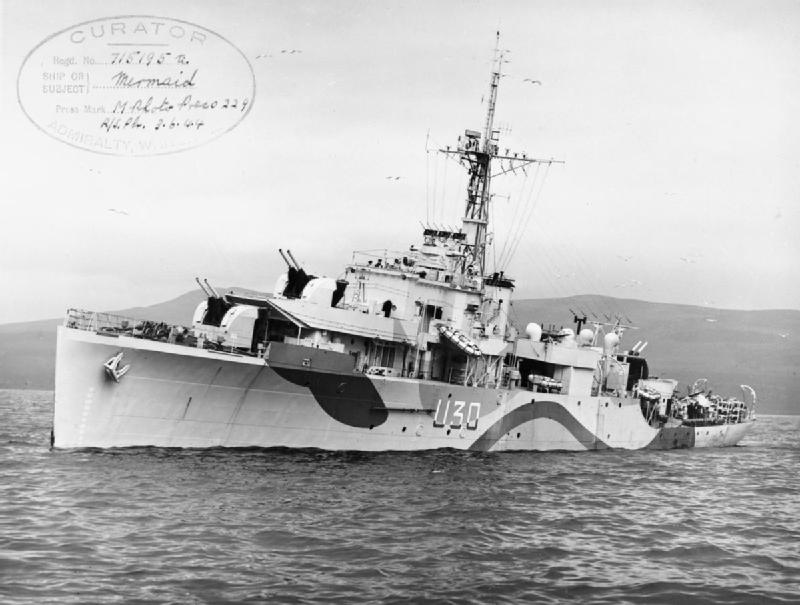
- Mermaid underway in 1944

History

United Kingdom
- Name: Mermaid
- Namesake: Mermaid
- Builder: William Denny and Brothers, Dumbarton
- Laid down: 8 September 1942
- Launched: 11 November 1943
- Completed: 12 May 1944
- Fate: Sold to West Germany, 5 May 1959

West Germany
- Name: Scharnhorst
- Namesake: Gerhard von Scharnhorst
- Acquired: 5 May 1959
- Decommissioned: 1980
- Fate: Broken up, April 1990

General characteristics
- Class & type: Modified Black Swan-class sloop

HMS Mermaid was a modified Black Swan-class sloop of the Royal Navy. Mermaid saw service as a convoy escort during the Second World War, taking part in the sinking of two German submarines while escorting Arctic convoys to and from the Soviet Union.

Mermaid was sold to Federal Republic of Germany in 1959, where she was renamed Scharnhorst and used as a training ship.

== Construction ==
Mermaid, built by William Denny and Brothers, Dumbarton, Scotland, was laid down on 8 September 1942, launched on 11 November 1943, and completed 12 May 1944.

As with all the modified Black Swans, Mermaid's main gun armament was six QF 4 inch Mk XVI anti-aircraft guns in three dual turrets. When completed, this was supplemented by a close-in anti-aircraft outfit of ten Oerlikon 20 mm cannon in three dual and two single mounts, although two twin 40 Bofors guns (in two twin mounts) replaced four of the 20 mm guns. Anti-submarine armament consisted of 110 depth charges and a Hedgehog anti-submarine spigot mortar.

== Royal Navy service ==
Mermaid's first operations were as part of the escort for the Arctic convoy JW 59 to Murmansk in August 1944, with it being credited with a part of sinking the U-boat U-354 on 24 August in conjunction with the destroyer Keppel, the sloop Peacock and the frigate Loch Dunvegan. On the return journey from Murmansk, escorting Convoy RA 59A, Mermaid again took part in sinking a German submarine, this time U-394 on 2 September, in conjunction with a Swordfish aircraft operating from the aircraft carrier Vindex, the destroyers Keppel and Whitehall and the sloop Peacock.

In 1945 Mermaid was assigned to the British Pacific Fleet. However arriving at Aden en route she learned of the Japanese surrender, and of her recall for service with the Mediterranean Fleet as part of the 33rd Escort Flotilla. She received the new pennant number 'F30' and was based in Malta, as part of the 3rd Frigate Flotilla. This Flotilla took part in patrols preventing illegal immigrants following the formation of Israel. In 1953 she returned to Portsmouth and took part in the Fleet Review to celebrate the Coronation of Queen Elizabeth II. In 1954 she was placed in reserve at Portsmouth.

== West German Navy service ==
In 1957, West Germany purchased seven escorts, including Mermaid for its newly established Bundesmarine. After refit, Mermaid was handed over to the Bundesmarine on 28 May 1959, and was renamed Scharnhorst. Scharnhorst was used as a gunnery training vessel by the Germans, and was refitted with a more modern gun armament and sensors from June 1961 to July 1962, with two automatic French 100 mm naval guns replacing six manually loaded 4 inch guns, with a short range armament of four Bofors L/70 40 mm guns replacing two 40 mm guns. Scharnhorst was removed from the active list in 1980, and was used for damage control training until broken up in 1990.

== Publications ==
- Blackman, Raymond V. B. (1971). Jane's Fighting Ships 1971–72. London: Sampson Low, Marston & Company. ISBN 0-354-00096-9.
- Blair, Clay (2000). Hitler's U-Boat War: The Hunted 1942–1945. New York: Modern Library. ISBN 0-679-64033-9.
- Colledge, J. J.; Warlow, Ben (2006) [1969]. Ships of the Royal Navy: The Complete Record of All Fighting Ships of the Royal Navy from the 15th Century to the Present (3rd Rev ed.). London: Chatham Publishing. ISBN 978-1-86176-281-8. OCLC 67375475.
- Gardiner, Robert; Chesneau, Roger (1980). Conway's All The World's Fighting Ships 1922–1946. London: Conway Maritime Press. ISBN 0-85177-146-7.
- Gardiner, Robert; Chumbley, Stephen (1995). Conway's All The World's Fighting Ships 1947–1995. Annapolis, Maryland, USA: Naval Institute Press. ISBN 1-55750-132-7.
- Hague, Arnold (1993). Sloops: A History of the 71 Sloops Built in Britain and Australia for the British, Australian and Indian Navies 1926–1946. Kendal, England: World Ship Society. ISBN 0-905617-67-3.
- Marriott, Leo (1983). Royal Navy Frigates 1945–1983. Ian Allan. ISBN 978-0-7110-1322-3.
