= HMS Keppel (D84) =

Destroyer of the Royal Navy

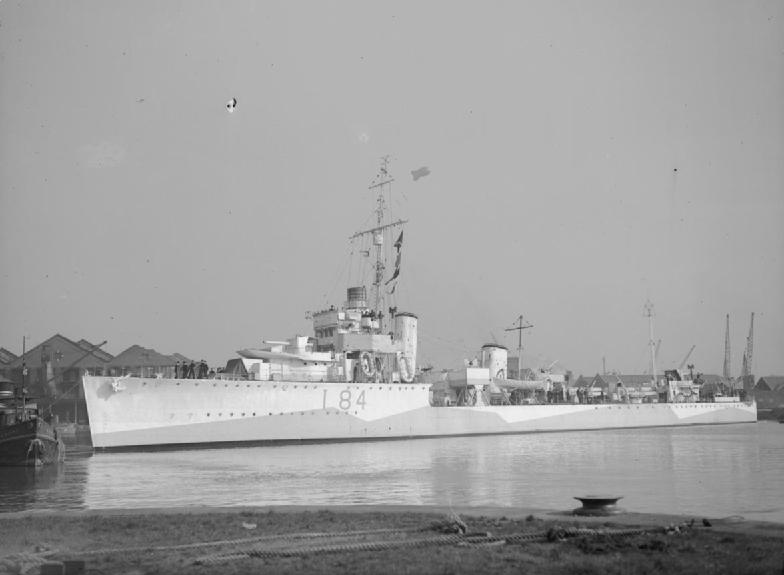
- HMS Keppel, in 1943

History

United Kingdom
- Name: HMS Keppel
- Namesake: Augustus Keppel
- Ordered: April 1918
- Builder: John I. Thornycroft & Company
- Yard number: 982
- Laid down: October 1918
- Launched: 23 April 1920
- Commissioned: 15 April 1925
- Recommissioned: August 1939
- Fate: Discarded 1945, Scrapped

General characteristics
- Class & type: Thornycroft type destroyer leader
- Displacement: 1,554 long tons (1,579 t) (standard); 2,009 long tons (2,041 t) (full load)
- Length: 329 ft (100 m) o/a; 318 ft 3 in (97.00 m) pp
- Beam: 31 ft 6 in (9.60 m)
- Draught: 12 ft 3 in (3.73 m)
- Installed power: 40,000 shp (30,000 kW)
- Propulsion: 2 × Brown-Curtiss single reduction steam turbines; 4 × Yarrow boilers; 2 × shafts
- Speed: 38 kn (44 mph; 70 km/h)
- Capacity: 500 short tons (450 t) fuel oil
- Complement: 164
- Armament: 5 × BL 4.7 in (120 mm) Mark I dual purpose gun, 1 × QF 3 inch 20 cwt anti-aircraft gun, 6 × 21 inch (533 mm) torpedo tubes (2 × 3)

Service record

HMS Keppel was a Thornycroft type flotilla leader built for the Royal Navy at the end of the First World War. She was completed too late to serve in that conflict, but saw extensive service in the inter war years and in World War II. She was an effective convoy escort and U-boat killer, being credited with the destruction of five U-boats during the Battle of the Atlantic. She was the second of three ships named for 18th century Admiral Augustus Keppel.

== Construction ==
Keppel was one of five ships of this class built as flotilla leaders by J I Thornycroft of Woolston, Hampshire to their own design. In this she was similar to the Admiralty's destroyer leader type, but built with features specific to Thornycroft's design principles. Keppel was ordered in April 1918 and laid down in October that year, but the war ended shortly after and work slowed with the advent of peace. Keppel was launched in April 1920 and moved to the Royal Navy Dockyard at Portsmouth, and later to Pembroke Dockyard, where she was finally completed in April 1925.

== Service history ==
After commissioning Keppel served on various stations in the inter-war period, in the Mediterranean and the Far East, before going into reserve in 1937. With war threatening she was re-commissioned in August 1939 and was stationed at Gibraltar as leader of 13th Destroyer Flotilla. In June 1940 she assisted in the evacuation of forces from France, and in Operation Catapult, the attack on the French Fleet at Mers el Kebir. Following this she was returned to Scapa Flow, joining 12th Destroyer Flotilla for fleet operations, such as assisting in fleet escort duty, offensive sweeps in home waters, and preparations to resist the expected German invasion.

In February 1941 she was deployed to the Western Approaches Escort Force for Atlantic convoy defence. She was designated as leader of 12th Escort Group, stationed at Londonderry. In this role Keppel was engaged in all the duties performed by escort ships; protecting convoys, searching for and attacking U-boats which attacked ships in convoy, and rescuing survivors. In four years service Keppel escorted more than 30 North Atlantic and over a dozen Gibraltar convoys, of which six were attacked, with the loss of 20 ships (though several others were also lost as stragglers) and she was involved in four major convoy battles. In this Keppel ensured the safe and timely arrival of over 1000 ships, destroyed one U-boat and assisted in the destruction of two others.

She also operated on the Arctic convoy route, escorting 15 convoys to and from the Soviet Union. Most of these were attacked, several suffering heavy losses; during this time Keppel attacked and destroyed four U-boats.

in March 1942 while with convoy WS 17 Keppel D/F'ed a U-boat later identified as U-587, which was attacked and destroyed by other units of the escort group.

In July 1942 Keppel was leader of the close escort for the ill-fated Arctic convoy PQ 17, which suffered heavy losses after the convoy was scattered.

In September 1942 she was part of the Distant Cover Force protecting PQ 18, and the returning QP 14, though the force was not directly involved in the fighting around them.

In early 1943 Keppel, now leading 3EG, returned to the Atlantic. In May 1943, while escorting HX 239, Keppel D/F'ed a U-boat later identified as U-752, which was attacked and destroyed by other units of the escort group. In September 1943, Keppel was involved in the battle around ONS 18, which saw six ships and three escorts sunk, for the destruction of three U-boats. One of these, U-229, was attacked and destroyed by Keppel on the last day of the battle. In January 1944 Keppel, now leading 8EG, returned to the Arctic convoy route. In February, with JW 57, she attacked and destroyed U-713, one of two dispatched by the escort group. On the return with RA 57, one ship was lost for the destruction of three U-boats and damage of two others. In April 1944, with JW 58, Keppel rammed and sank U-360, one of four U-boats destroyed in this action. In summer 1944 Keppel transferred to the Channel for Operation Neptune, the naval operations supporting the Normandy landings. In August 1944, with JW 59, Keppel and other units attacked and destroyed U-354, one of two accounted for, for the loss of one escort, HMS Kite. Returning with RA 59A, Keppel and other units attacked and destroyed U-394.

In June 1945 Keppel was decommissioned and in July 1945 was sold off for breaking/to be scrapped.

== Battle honours ==
During her service Keppel was awarded four battle honours:

- Atlantic 1940–43
- Malta convoys 1942
- Arctic 1942–45
- Normandy 1944

== Successes ==
During her service Keppel was credited with the destruction of five U-boats, and assisted in the destruction of two others:

Date	U-boat	Type	Location	Notes
27 March 1942	U-587	VIIC	W of Ushant; 47°10′N 21°39′W	in action with WS 17; D/Fed by Keppel, d/c and sunk by Grove, Aldenham, Volunteer and Leamington
23 May 1943	U-752	VIIC	W of R. Shannon; 51°48′N 29°32′W	in action with HX 239; D/Fed by Keppel, d/c and sunk by Fairey Swordfish from Archer
22 September 1943	U-229	VIIC	N Atlantic (SE of Cape Farewell); 54°36′N 36°25′W	in action with ONS 18, d/c, shelled, rammed and sunk by Keppel
24 February 1944	U-713	VIIC	Arctic NW of Lofoten; 69°27′N 04°53′E	in action with JW 57; depth-charged and sunk by Keppel
2 April 1944	U-360	VIIC	Arctic SW of Bear Island; 73°28′N 13°04′E	in action with JW 58; d/c and sunk by Keppel
24 August 1944	U-354	VIIC	Arctic N of Murmansk; 72°49′N 30°41′E	in action with JW 59 d/c and sunk by Keppel and three others; Mermaid, Peacock, Loch Dunvegan
2 September 1944	U-394	VIIC	Arctic W of Lofoten; 69°47′N 04°10′E	in action with RA 59A; sunk by rockets by Swordfish from Vindex, d/c by Keppel and three others; Mermaid, Peacock, Whitehall
