= HMS Hind (U39) =

Modified Black Swan-class sloop

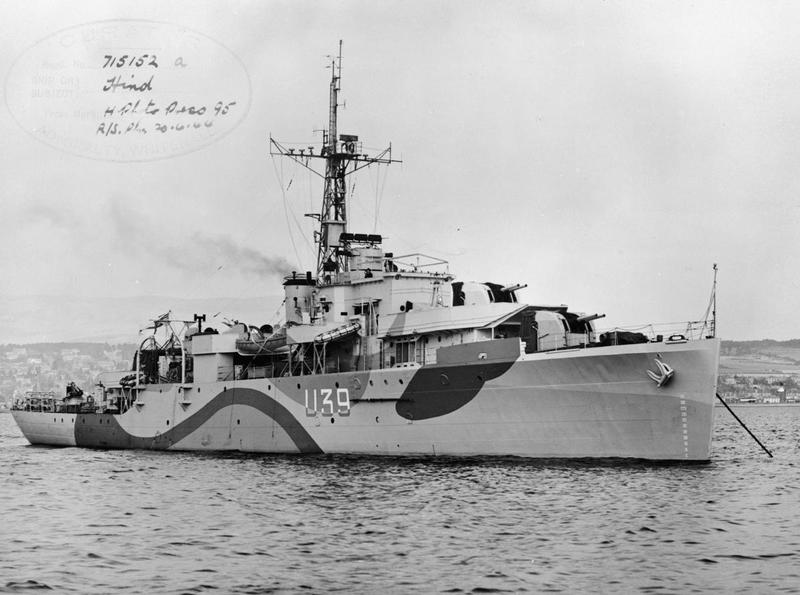
- HMS Hind anchored in 1943.

History

United Kingdom
- Name: Hind
- Namesake: Hind
- Ordered: 11 February 1942
- Builder: William Denny and Brothers, Dumbarton
- Laid down: 31 August 1942
- Launched: 30 September 1943
- Commissioned: 11 April 1944
- Decommissioned: 1951
- Identification: Pennant number: U39
- Fate: Broken up in 1959

General characteristics
- Class & type: Modified Black Swan-class sloop
- Displacement: 1,350 tons
- Length: 283 ft (86 m)
- Beam: 38.5 ft (11.7 m)
- Propulsion: Geared turbines; two shafts
- Speed: 20 knots (37 km/h) at 4,300 hp (3,200 kW)
- Complement: 192 men + 1 Cat
- Armament: 6 × QF 4 in Mk XVI anti-aircraft guns; 12 × 20 mm anti-aircraft guns

HMS Hind was a modified Black Swan-class sloop of the Royal Navy. She was laid down by William Denny and Brothers, Dumbarton on 31 August 1942, launched on 30 September 1943 and commissioned on 11 April 1944, with the pennant number U39.

== Design and construction ==
Hind was one of two Modified Black Swan-class sloops ordered by the Admiralty on 11 February 1942. The Modified Black Swans were an improved version of the pre-war Black Swan-class sloops, with greater beam, allowing a heavier close-in anti-aircraft armament to be accommodated.

Hind was 299 ft 6 in (91.29 m) long overall and 283 ft 0 in (86.26 m) between perpendiculars, with a beam of 38 feet 6 inches (11.73 m) and a draught of 11 ft 4 in (3.45 m) at deep load. Displacement of the Modified Black Swans was 1,350–1,490 long tons (1,370–1,510 t) standard and 1,880–1,950 long tons (1,910–1,980 t) deep load depending on the armament and equipment fitted. Two Admiralty three-drum water-tube boilers provided steam to Parsons geared steam turbines which drove two shafts. The machinery was rated at 4,300 shaft horsepower (3,200 kW), giving a speed of 19.75 knots (36.58 km/h; 22.73 mph).

The ship's main gun armament (as fitted to all the Modified Black Swans) consisted of three twin QF 4-inch (102 mm) Mk XVI guns, in dual purpose mounts, capable of both anti-ship and anti-aircraft use. Hind completed with a close-in anti-aircraft armament of 4 twin and 2 single Oerlikon 20 mm cannon. She later had two single Bofors 40 mm guns added. Post war, the close-in anti aircraft armament was reduced to two single Bofors guns and two single Oerlikon cannon. Anti-submarine armament consisted of eight depth charge throwers and two rails, with 110 depth charges carried, together with a split Hedgehog anti submarine mortar.

Hind was laid down at William Denny and Brothers' Dumbarton shipyard on 31 August 1942, and was launched on 30 September 1943. The ship was completed on 11 April 1944. She was the eighteenth ship of that name to serve with the Royal Navy.

== Career ==
After working up at Tobermory, Mull, Hind was assigned to the upcoming invasion of France. On 6 June 1944, D-Day, Hind escorted Assault Convoy G3, consisting of 26 landing craft carrying the 56th and 151st Infantry Brigades. Following the completion of invasion duties, Hind carried out escort operations in the English Channel until she was nominated for service in the East Indies Fleet.

After repair of defects at Holyhead, Hind escorted a troop convoy to Port Said in Egypt, followed by escorting convoys out of Aden before arriving at Colombo, Ceylon (now Sri Lanka) in December 1944. Hind joined the 60th Escort Group and was employed on escort duties in the Indian Ocean until the end of February 1945, when defects forced the sloop to be laid up at Colombo throughout March, before being sent to Alexandria, Egypt for repair, which took from April to August that year. Hind was then ordered to join the British Pacific Fleet, but was still at Colombo when the war ended.

== Bibliography ==
- Battle Summary - No. 39: Operation "Neptune" Landings in Normandy June 1944: Volume I. Tactical and Staff Duties Division, Admiralty. 1947. Part I: Preparation, Part II: Execution, Index.
- Battle Summary - No. 39: Operation "Neptune" Landings in Normandy June 1944: Volume II: Appendices. Tactical and Staff Duties Division, Admiralty. 1947. part 1 of 2: Appendix A to G, part 2 of 2: Appendix H to Q.
- Colledge, J. J.; Warlow, Ben (2006) [1969]. Ships of the Royal Navy: The Complete Record of All Fighting Ships of the Royal Navy from the 15th Century to the Present (3rd Rev ed.). London: Chatham Publishing. ISBN 978-1-86176-281-8. OCLC 67375475.
- Friedman, Norman (2008). British Destroyers and Frigates: The Second World War and After. Barnsley, UK: Seaforth Publishing. ISBN 978-1-84832-015-4.
- Gardiner, Robert; Chesneau, Roger, eds. (1980). Conway's All the World's Fighting Ships 1922–1946. London: Conway Maritime Press. ISBN 0-85177-146-7.
- Hague, Arnold (1993). Sloops: A History of the 71 Sloops Built in Britain and Australia for the British, Australian and Indian Navies 1926–1946. Kendal, England: World Ship Society. ISBN 0-905617-67-3.
- Winser, John de S. (1994). The D-Day Ships: Neptune: the Greatest Amphibious Operation in History. Kendal, UK: World Ship Society. ISBN 0-905617-75-4.
