= HMS Lapwing (U62) =

Sloop of the Royal Navy

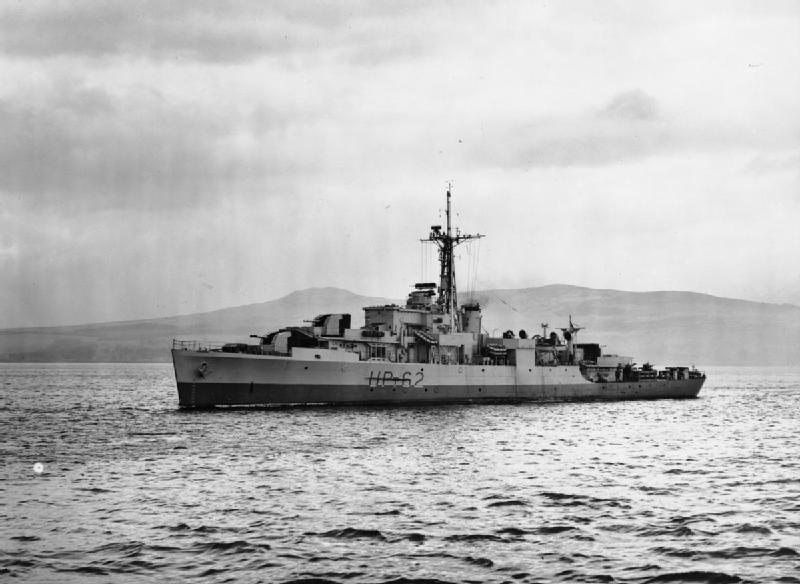

History

United Kingdom
- Name: HMS Lapwing
- Ordered: 27 March 1941
- Builder: Scotts Shipbuilding and Engineering Company
- Laid down: 17 December 1941
- Launched: 16 July 1943
- Completed: 21 March 1944
- Identification: Pennant number U62
- Fate: Sunk, 20 March 1945

General characteristics
- Class & type: Modified Black Swan-class sloop
- Complement: 192

HMS Lapwing (U62) was a modified Black Swan-class sloop of the Royal Navy.

Named after the bird of the same name, she was built by Scotts Shipbuilding and Engineering Company, Greenock, on the banks of the River Clyde. She was launched on 16 July 1943.

On 20 March 1945 HMS Lapwing was escorting part of the Russian Convoy JW 65 to Murmansk, when she was torpedoed by the German submarine U-968. Hit amidships, she sank within 20 minutes with the loss of 158 lives. 61 men were rescued.

== Construction and design ==
Lapwing was one of eight Modified Black Swan-class sloops ordered by the Admiralty on 27 March 1941 as part of the 1940 Supplemental War Programme. The Modified Black Swans were an improved version of the pre-war Black Swan-class sloops, with greater beam, allowing a heavier close-in anti-aircraft armament to be accommodated.

Lapwing was 299 ft 6 in (91.29 m) long overall and 283 ft 0 in (86.26 m) between perpendiculars, with a beam of 38 feet 6 inches (11.73 m) and a draught of 11 ft 4 in (3.45 m) at deep load. Displacement of the Modified Black Swans was 1,350–1,490 long tons (1,370–1,510 t) standard and 1,880–1,950 long tons (1,910–1,980 t) deep load depending on the armament and equipment fitted. Two Admiralty three-drum water-tube boilers provided steam to Parsons geared steam turbines which drove two shafts. The machinery was rated at 4,300 shp (3,200 kW), giving a speed of 19.75 kn (22.73 mph; 36.58 km/h).

The ship's main gun armament (as fitted to all the Modified Black Swans) consisted of 3 twin QF 4 inch (102 mm) Mk XVI guns, in dual purpose mounts, capable of both anti-ship and anti-aircraft use. Close-in anti-aircraft armament varied between the ships of the class, with Lapwing completing with an armament of ten Oerlikon 20 mm cannon (4 twin and 2 single mounts). The ship carried a heavy depth charge outfit of 110 charges, and was originally planned to be fitted with eight depth-charge throwers and three rails, although this was later revised to four throwers and two chutes as this gave a more efficient pattern of depth charges.

Lapwing was laid down at Scotts Shipbuilding and Engineering Company's Greenock shipyard as yard number 605 on 17 December 1941, was launched on 16 July 1943 and completed on 21 March 1944. She was allocated the pennant number U62, although owing to an apparent error at the shipyard, this was painted on the ship as UP_{T}62.

== HMS Lapwing Memorial ==
Lapwing’s memorial stone was unveiled in The Close Garden, Saffron Walden.

In December 1941, Saffron Walden Borough and Rural Councils decided to band together to raise £120,000 to adopt a ship and have the Saffron Walden coat of arms painted on its quarterdeck. Through a tremendous fund-raising effort the town succeeded and was allocated HMS Lapwing in June 1942, whereupon townsfolk began knitting essentials for the crew, exchanging letters and even hanging the Lapwing crest in the town hall, where it remains to this day.

== Bibliography ==
- Gardiner, Robert; Chesneau, Roger, eds. (1980). Conway's All the World's Fighting Ships 1922–1946. Greenwich, UK: Conway Maritime Press. ISBN 0-85177-146-7.
- Colledge, J. J.; Warlow, Ben (2006) [1969]. Ships of the Royal Navy: The Complete Record of All Fighting Ships of the Royal Navy from the 15th Century to the Present (3rd Rev ed.). London: Chatham Publishing. ISBN 978-1-86176-281-8. OCLC 67375475.
- Elliott, Peter (1977). Allied Escort Ships of World War II: A complete survey. London: Macdonald and Jane's. ISBN 0-356-08401-9.
- Friedman, Norman (2008). British Destroyers and Frigates: The Second World War and After. Barnsley, UK: Seaforth Publishing. ISBN 978-1-84832-015-4.
- Hague, Arnold (1993). Sloops: A History of the 71 Sloops Built in Britain and Australia for the British, Australian and Indian Navies 1926–1946. Kendal, England: World Ship Society. ISBN 0-905617-67-3.
- Lenton, H. T. (1998). British & Empire Warships of the Second World War. Annapolis, Maryland: Naval Institute Press. ISBN 1-55750-048-7.
- Rohwer, Jürgen (2005). Chronology of the War at Sea 1939–1945: The Naval History of World War Two (Third Revised ed.). Annapolis, Maryland: Naval Institute Press. ISBN 1-59114-119-2.
- Ruegg, Bob; Hague, Arnold (1993). Convoys to Russia: 1941–1945. Kendal, UK: World Ship Society. ISBN 0-905617-66-5.
