= HMS Cygnet (U38) =

Modified Black Swan-class sloop

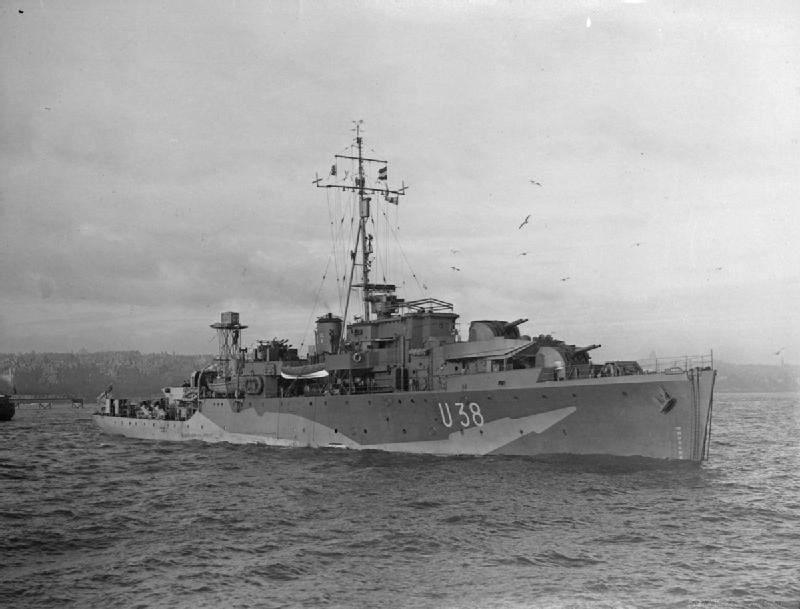
- HMS Cygnet anchored in 1943.

History

United Kingdom
- Name: Cygnet
- Namesake: Cygnet
- Ordered: 27 March 1941
- Builder: Cammell Laird, Birkenhead
- Laid down: 30 August 1941
- Launched: 28 July 1942
- Commissioned: 1 December 1943
- Decommissioned: 1954
- Identification: Pennant number: U38
- Fate: Scrapped in 1965

General characteristics
- Class & type: Modified Black Swan-class sloop
- Displacement: 1,350 tons
- Length: 283 ft (86 m)
- Beam: 38.5 ft (11.7 m)
- Propulsion: Geared turbines; two shafts
- Speed: 20 knots (37 km/h) at 4,300 hp (3,200 kW)
- Complement: 192 men + 1 Cat
- Armament: 6 × QF 4 in Mk XVI anti-aircraft guns; 12 × 20 mm anti-aircraft guns

HMS Cygnet was a modified Black Swan-class sloop of the Royal Navy. She was laid down by Cammell Laird, Birkenhead on 30 August 1941, launched on 28 July 1942 and commissioned on 1 December 1943, with the pennant number U38.

== Construction and career ==
After tests and operational commissioning in November 1942 at Tobermory, HMS Cygnet was damaged by an air attack on 9 December, which took her to a commercial shipyard on the Clyde in Scotland until March 1943.

In March 1943, she joined the 2nd Escort Group based in Liverpool and was deployed with the group as part of an escort of a military convoy to Gibraltar on her return to the United Kingdom.

She was transferred in April 1943 to the 7th Escort Group based in Greenock to support convoys threatened with attack by U-Boats in the North Atlantic.

After a passage to the 2nd Escort Group in May 1943 for the protection of the ONS 8 convoy, she returned to the 7th Escort Group in June 1943, Cygnet joined the defence group of military convoys during the passage through the Mediterranean for the planned Allied landings of Sicily as part of Operation Husky.

In early 1944, she joined the Home Fleet and participated in several protections of Arctic convoys as well as the defence of Atlantic convoys.

On 8 April 1944 the Cygnet with the sloop HMS Crane sank the U-962 in the North Atlantic north-west of Cape Finisterre by depth charges.

On 13 April 1944 she was damaged by its grounding on entering Belfast, depriving it of actions during the Normandy landings.

Cygnet resumed the protection of convoys from July 1944 until the end of the war in Europe leaving or arriving from Kola Bay. At the end of May, she was appointed to join the Pacific. She entered a commercial yard in Leith for repairs and improvements for her future theatre of operations until early September, or during sea trials after the refit, she was again damaged by a grounding and had to resume repairs.

The order to leave for the Pacific was cancelled following the dropping of atomic bombs on Hiroshima and Nagasaki and the subsequent surrender of Japan.
