= HMS Erne (U03) =

Sloop of the Royal Navy

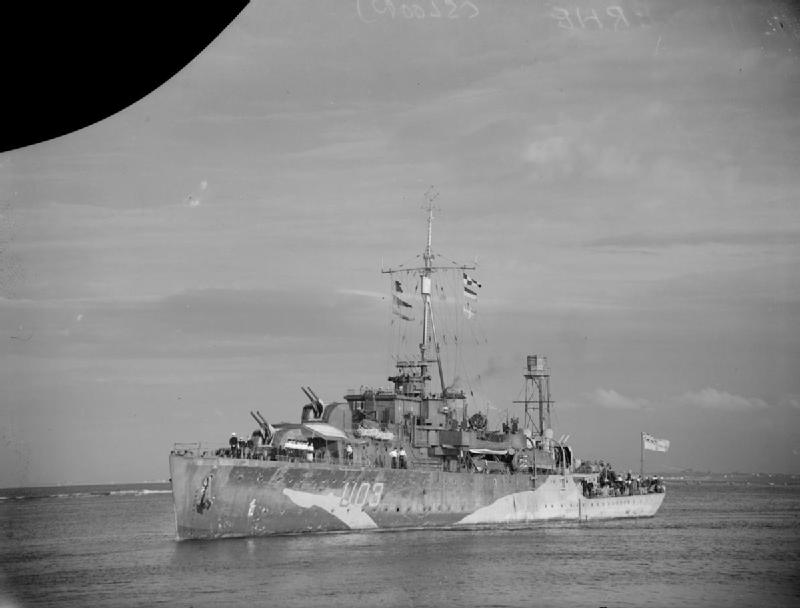
- HMS Erne in March 1943

History

United Kingdom
- Name: HMS Erne
- Builder: Furness Shipbuilding
- Laid down: 21 September 1939
- Launched: 5 August 1940
- Commissioned: 3 April 1941
- Identification: Pennant number U03
- Motto: Surtout: 'Above all'
- Honours and awards: NORTH AFRICA 1942; ATLANTIC 1942–45; SICILY 1943
- Fate: Scrapped 27 October 1965
- Badge: On a field blue, an Erne rising white

General characteristics
- Class & type: Black Swan-class sloop

HMS Erne, pennant number U03, was a Black Swan-class sloop in the Royal Navy. She was laid down by Furness Shipbuilding at Haverton Hill-on-Tees, Co. Durham on 21 September 1939, launched on 5 August 1940 and commissioned on 3 April 1941. She was adopted by the district of Bootle, then in Lancashire, as part of Warship Week in 1942.

She took her name like others in her class from birds, in this case a white-tailed eagle, also known as the erne.

== Service history ==
On 30 April 1941, while Erne was still at the builders yard (4 days after commissioning), a near miss during a German air attack caused heavy damage. Repairs took until June 1942.

On 31 July 1942, depth charges from the three British sloops Erne, Rochester and Sandwich sank the German submarine U-213 in the North Atlantic east of the Azores, in position 36º45'N, 22º50'W.

On 29 August 1942, Erne, scuttled the Dutch merchant Zuiderkerk with depth charges. The German submarine U-566 had torpedoed Zuiderkerk west-north-west of Lisbon, Portugal in position 40º20'N, 16º02'W. A torpedo had caused extensive flooding of the forward holds, which forced the 56 crew members and twelve passengers to abandon ship in the early morning. Leith picked up the survivors.

== Fate ==
Erne was reduced to a drill ship on 4 June 1952 and renamed Wessex. In 1965 she was sold for scrap and arrived at Antwerp on 27 October 1965 where she was broken up.

== Publications ==
- Hague, Arnold (1993). Sloops: A History of the 71 Sloops Built in Britain and Australia for the British, Australian and Indian Navies 1926–1946. Kendal, England: World Ship Society. ISBN 0-905617-67-3.
- Colledge, J. J.; Warlow, Ben (2006) [1969]. Ships of the Royal Navy: The Complete Record of All Fighting Ships of the Royal Navy from the 15th Century to the Present (3rd Rev ed.). London: Chatham Publishing. ISBN 978-1-86176-281-8. OCLC 67375475.
