= HMS Ibis =

Black Swan-class sloop

Coordinates: 37°0′N 3°0′E

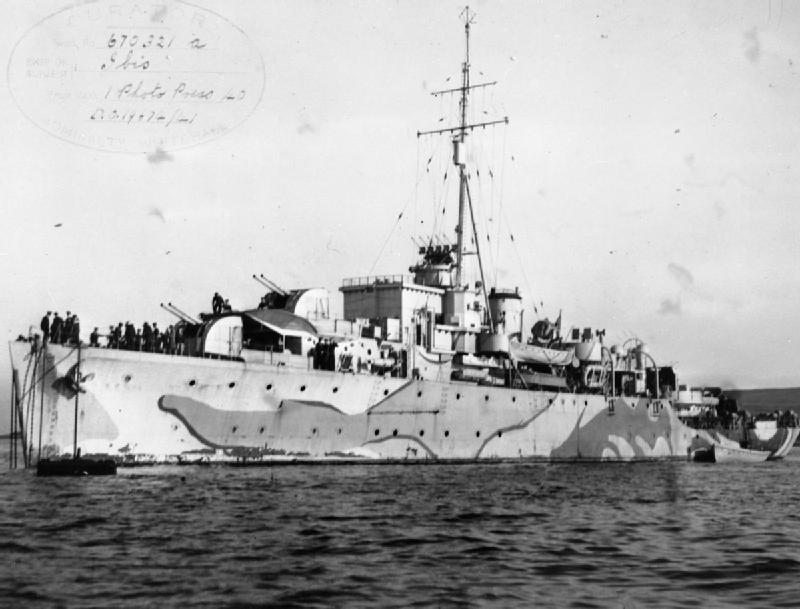
- Ibis in 1941

History

United Kingdom
- Name: HMS Ibis
- Builder: Furness Shipbuilding Co. Ltd.
- Laid down: 22 September 1939
- Launched: 28 November 1940
- Completed: 30 August 1941
- Identification: Pennant number U99
- Honours and awards: ATLANTIC 1941-42; NORTH AFRICA 1942
- Fate: Sunk 10 November 1942
- Badge: On a Field Blue Issuant from water in a base barry wavy of four white and blue, an Ibis Proper

General characteristics
- Class & type: Black Swan-class sloop

HMS Ibis, pennant number U99, was a Black Swan-class sloop of the Royal Navy, named after the Ibis.

She was built by Furness Shipbuilding Co. Ltd., Haverton Hill-on-Tees, Co. Durham, was laid down on 22 September 1939, launched on 28 November 1940, and completed 30 August 1941. She was adopted by the civil community of Stoke Newington in London as part of the Warship Week savings campaign in 1942.

Ibis was sunk by an airborne torpedo from an Italian aircraft in the Western Mediterranean, north of Algiers, French Algeria, on 10 November 1942.

The Scottish comedian Rikki Fulton was a member of her crew.

== Publications ==
- Colledge, J. J.; Warlow, Ben (2006) [1969]. Ships of the Royal Navy: The Complete Record of All Fighting Ships of the Royal Navy from the 15th Century to the Present (3rd Rev ed.). London: Chatham Publishing. ISBN 978-1-86176-281-8. OCLC 67375475.
- Hague, Arnold (1993). Sloops: A History of the 71 Sloops Built in Britain and Australia for the British, Australian and Indian Navies 1926–1946. Kendal, England: World Ship Society. ISBN 0-905617-67-3.
- Hughes, Robert (1975). Flagship to Murmansk. London, England: Future Publications. ISBN 0860072665. Pages 83–6 give an account of the sinking of the Ibis and the rescue of survivors as seen by HMS Scylla.
