= German submarine U-354 =

German World War II submarine

History

Nazi Germany
- Name: U-354
- Ordered: 9 October 1939
- Builder: Flensburger Schiffbau-Gesellschaft, Flensburg
- Yard number: 473
- Laid down: 15 April 1940
- Launched: 10 January 1942
- Commissioned: 22 April 1942
- Fate: Sunk by British warships in the Barents Sea on 24 August 1944

General characteristics
- Class & type: Type VIIC submarine
- Displacement: 769 tonnes (757 long tons) surfaced; 871 t (857 long tons) submerged
- Length: 67.10 m (220 ft 2 in) o/a; 50.50 m (165 ft 8 in) pressure hull
- Beam: 6.20 m (20 ft 4 in) o/a; 4.70 m (15 ft 5 in) pressure hull
- Height: 9.60 m (31 ft 6 in)
- Draught: 4.74 m (15 ft 7 in)
- Installed power: 2,800–3,200 PS (2,100–2,400 kW; 2,800–3,200 bhp) (diesels); 750 PS (550 kW; 740 shp) (electric)
- Propulsion: 2 shafts; 2 × diesel engines; 2 × electric motors
- Speed: 17.7 knots (32.8 km/h; 20.4 mph) surfaced; 7.6 knots (14.1 km/h; 8.7 mph) submerged
- Range: 8,500 nmi (15,700 km; 9,800 mi) at 10 knots (19 km/h; 12 mph) surfaced; 80 nmi (150 km; 92 mi) at 4 knots (7.4 km/h; 4.6 mph) submerged
- Test depth: 230 m (750 ft); Crush depth: 250–295 m (820–968 ft)
- Complement: 4 officers, 40–56 enlisted
- Armament: 5 × 53.3 cm (21 in) torpedo tubes (four bow, one stern); 14 × torpedoes or 26 TMA mines; 1 × 8.8 cm (3.46 in) deck gun (220 rounds); 1 x 2 cm (0.79 in) C/30 AA gun

Service record
- Part of: 5th U-boat Flotilla; 22 April – 30 September 1942; 1st U-boat Flotilla; 1 – 14 October 1942; 11th U-boat Flotilla; 15 October 1942 – 31 May 1943; 13th U-boat Flotilla; 1 June 1943 – 24 August 1944
- Identification codes: M 46 036
- Commanders: Kptlt. Karl-Heinz Herbschleb; 22 April 1942 – 22 February 1944; Oblt.z.S. Hans-Jürgen Sthamer; 22 February – 24 August 1944
- Operations: 11 patrols: 1st patrol: 29 October – 30 November 1942; 2nd patrol: a. 19 December 1942 – 15 January 1943; b. 18 – 20 January 1943; 3rd patrol: a. 11 March – 4 April 1943; b. 28 – 30 April 1943; 4th patrol: a. 9 May – 12 June 1943; b. 13 – 15 June 1943; c. 25 – 27 July 1943; 5th patrol: 4 August – 22 September 1943; 6th patrol: a. 22 – 23 October 1943; b. 25 October – 6 December 1943; 7th patrol: a. 7 December 1943 – 1 January 1944; b. 3 – 4 January 1944; c. 2 – 5 March 1944; 8th patrol: 8 March – 12 April 1944; 9th patrol: a. 18 April – 3 May 1944; b. 6 – 10 May 1944; c. 24 – 28 June 1944; 10th patrol: a. 30 June – 3 July 1944; b. 4 – 28 July 1944; 11th patrol: 21 – 24 August 1944
- Victories: 1 merchant ship sunk (7,176 GRT); 1 warship sunk (1,300 tons); 1 warship total loss (11,420 tons); 1 merchant ship damaged (3,771 GRT)

German submarine U-354 was a Type VIIC U-boat of Nazi Germany's Kriegsmarine during World War II.

She carried out 11 patrols before being sunk in the Barents Sea by British warships on 24 August 1944.

She sank one merchant ship and one warship, damaged a merchant vessel and caused a warship to be declared a total loss.

== Design ==
German Type VIIC submarines were preceded by the shorter Type VIIB submarines. U-354 had a displacement of 769 tonnes (757 long tons) when at the surface and 871 tonnes (857 long tons) while submerged. She had a total length of 67.10 m (220 ft 2 in), a pressure hull length of 50.50 m (165 ft 8 in), a beam of 6.20 m (20 ft 4 in), a height of 9.60 m (31 ft 6 in), and a draught of 4.74 m (15 ft 7 in). The submarine was powered by two Germaniawerft F46 four-stroke, six-cylinder supercharged diesel engines producing a total of 2,800 to 3,200 metric horsepower (2,060 to 2,350 kW; 2,760 to 3,160 shp) for use while surfaced, two AEG GU 460/8–27 double-acting electric motors producing a total of 750 metric horsepower (550 kW; 740 shp) for use while submerged. She had two shafts and two 1.23 m (4 ft) propellers. The boat was capable of operating at depths of up to 230 metres (750 ft).

The submarine had a maximum surface speed of 17.7 knots (32.8 km/h; 20.4 mph) and a maximum submerged speed of 7.6 knots (14.1 km/h; 8.7 mph). When submerged, the boat could operate for 80 nautical miles (150 km; 92 mi) at 4 knots (7.4 km/h; 4.6 mph); when surfaced, she could travel 8,500 nautical miles (15,700 km; 9,800 mi) at 10 knots (19 km/h; 12 mph). U-354 was fitted with five 53.3 cm (21 in) torpedo tubes (four fitted at the bow and one at the stern), fourteen torpedoes, one 8.8 cm (3.46 in) SK C/35 naval gun, 220 rounds, and a 2 cm (0.79 in) C/30 anti-aircraft gun. The boat had a complement of between forty-four and sixty.

== Service history ==
The submarine was laid down on 15 April 1940 at the Flensburger Schiffbau-Gesellschaft yard at Flensburg as yard number 473, launched on 10 January 1942 and commissioned on 22 April under the command of Kapitänleutnant Karl-Heinz Herbschleb.

U-354 served with the 5th U-boat Flotilla, for training and then with the 1st flotilla for operations from 1 October 1942. She came under the command of the 11th flotilla on 15 October and was reassigned to the 13th flotilla on 1 June 1943; she stayed with that organization until her sinking.

U-348 made short trips from Kiel in Germany to Bergen and Skjomenfjord in Norway between April and October 1942.

=== First and second patrols ===
Her first patrol began with her departure from Skjomenfjord on 29 October 1942. On 4 November she sank the William Clark off Jan Mayen Island. This ship had already possibly been damaged by bombs from Ju 88 aircraft. A crewman was lost overboard on the 11th. The boat put into Narvik on the 30th.

The submarine's second foray over Christmas and New Year's Eve took her from Narvik, as far as Bear Island and back to Narvik.

=== Third and fourth patrols ===
U-354's third patrol was marred by the suicide of Maschinenmaat Helmut Richter on 12 March 1943.

Her fourth sortie took the boat north of Bear Island; she returned to Narvik on 12 June 1943.

=== Fifth patrol ===
It was during this patrol that she attacked and damaged the Soviet Petrovskij in the eastern Kara Sea on 27 August 1943.

=== Sixth patrol ===
This patrol was split in two: the first part, which was rather brief, was over 22 and 23 October 1943. The second part was longer; between 25 October and 6 December. The boat finished up in Hammerfest in the far north of Norway.

=== Seventh, eighth and ninth patrols ===
U-354 continued to patrol northern waters, without success.

=== Tenth patrol ===
By now moored in Bogenbucht (west of Narvik), the next sally was also divided in two. The boat sailed west of Svalbard and Franz Josef Land, but targets continued to elude her.

=== Eleventh patrol and loss ===
In August 1944 U-354 was deployed to search for Murmansk convoy JW 59. On 22 August, northwest of the North Cape, she encountered a carrier group involved in Operation Goodwood, an air attack on the battleship Tirpitz. U-354 damaged the escort carrier Nabob with a FAT torpedo, but a second shot, intended as a 'coup de grâce', hit the frigate Bickerton which was subsequently abandoned and scuttled. Nabob was recovered to Scapa Flow, but declared to be a total loss.

Two days later, on 24 August, U-354 found the convoy but was sunk with all hands by its escort group, comprising the sloops Mermaid and Peacock, the frigate Loch Dunvegan and the destroyer Keppel.

=== Wolfpacks ===
U-354 took part in nine wolfpacks, namely:

- Eisbär (27 March – 1 April 1943)
- Wiking (4 August – 15 September 1943)
- Eisenbart (1 November – 4 December 1943)
- Eisenbart (8 – 28 December 1943)
- Boreas (9 – 10 March 1944)
- Hammer (10 March – 5 April 1944)
- Donner (5 – 11 April 1944)
- Donner & Keil (20 April – 2 May 1944)
- Trutz (22 – 24 August 1944)

=== Previously recorded fate ===
U-354 was originally thought to have been sunk by a Fairey Swordfish of No. 825 Naval Air Squadron from the escort carrier HMS Vindex on 22 August 1944. This was U-344.

== Summary of raiding history ==
Date	Ship Name	Nationality	Tonnage (Note: Merchant ship tonnages are in gross register tons. Military vessels are listed by tons displacement.)	Fate
4 November 1942	William Clark	United States	7,176	Sunk
27 August 1943	Petrovskij	Soviet Union	3,771	Damaged
22 August 1944	HMS Bickerton	Royal Navy	1,300	Sunk
22 August 1944	HMS Nabob	Royal Navy	11,420	Total loss

== Bibliography ==
- Busch, Rainer; Röll, Hans-Joachim (1999). German U-boat commanders of World War II : a biographical dictionary. Translated by Brooks, Geoffrey. London, Annapolis, Md: Greenhill Books, Naval Institute Press. ISBN 1-55750-186-6.
- Busch, Rainer; Röll, Hans-Joachim (1999). Der U-Boot-Krieg, 1939-1945: Deutsche U-Boot-Verluste von September 1939 bis Mai 1945 [German U-boat losses from September 1939 to May 1945] (in German). Vol. IV. Hamburg, Berlin, Bonn: Mittler. ISBN 3-8132-0514-2.
- Gröner, Erich; Jung, Dieter; Maass, Martin (1991). U-boats and Mine Warfare Vessels. German Warships 1815–1945. Vol. 2. Translated by Thomas, Keith; Magowan, Rachel. London: Conway Maritime Press. ISBN 0-85177-593-4.
- Kemp, Paul (1999). U-Boats Destroyed – German Submarine Losses in the World Wars. London: Arms & Armour. ISBN 1-85409-515-3.
