= Black Swan-class sloop (2012) =

Conceptual classes of sloop of the Royal Navy

The Black Swan class were a conceptual classes of sloop of the Royal Navy. Produced by the UK Ministry of Defence in 2012. The concept gets its name from the Second World War Black Swan-class sloop.
