= HMS Pheasant (U49) =

Sloop of the Royal Navy

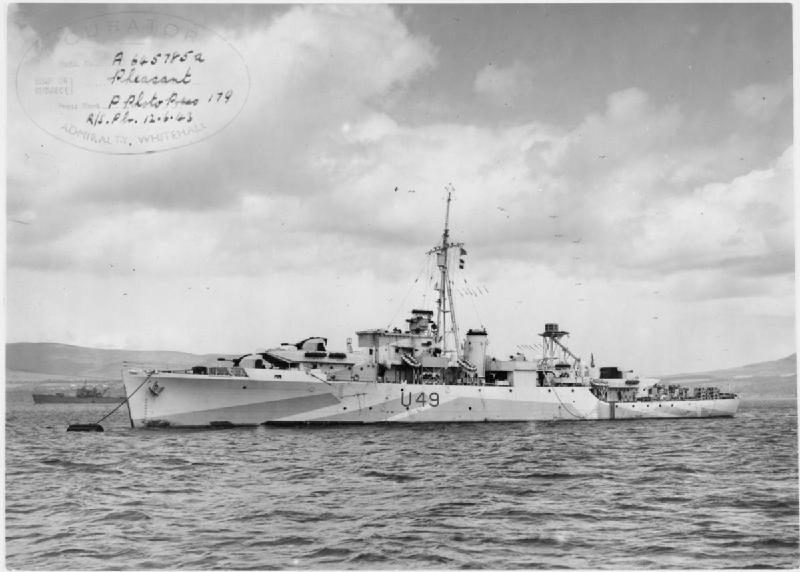
- Pheasant moored at a buoy in May 1943

History

United Kingdom
- Name: HMS Pheasant
- Namesake: Pheasant
- Builder: Yarrow Shipbuilders
- Laid down: 13 July 1942
- Launched: 21 December 1942
- Commissioned: 12 May 1943
- Reclassified: As a frigate in 1947
- Identification: Pennant number U49/F49
- Honours and awards: Buenos Aires 1807; Sicily 1943; Atlantic 1943–44; Okinawa 1945
- Fate: Broken up 1963
- Badge: On a Field White, a Pheasant Proper

General characteristics
- Class & type: Modified Black Swan-class sloop
- Displacement: 1,925 tons
- Length: 283 ft (86 m)
- Beam: 38 ft 6 in (11.73 m)
- Draught: 11 ft (3.4 m)
- Propulsion: Geared turbines, two shafts; 4,300 hp (3.2 MW)
- Speed: 20 knots (37 km/h)
- Range: 4,500 mi (7,200 km)
- Complement: 192
- Armament: 6 × 4-inch (102 mm) AA guns (3 × 2); 4 × 2-pdr AA pom-pom; 12 × 20 mm Oerlikon AA (6 × 2); Hedgehog anti-submarine mortar

Service record
- Part of: British Pacific Fleet (1945)
- Operations: Operation Husky (1943)

HMS Pheasant was a modified Black Swan-class sloop of the Royal Navy. She was laid down by Yarrow Shipbuilders, in Scotstoun, Glasgow on 13 July 1942, launched on 21 December 1942, and commissioned on 12 May 1943. She was adopted by the rural district of Runcorn, then in Cheshire, as part of Warship Week in 1942.

== Design ==
The modified Black Swan-class sloops were specialised convoy-defence vessels, with anti-aircraft and anti-submarine capabilities. They were designed to have a longer range than a destroyer at the expense of lower top speed while remaining capable of outrunning the German Type VII and Type IX U-boats when they were surfaced.

Pheasant had a top speed of 20 knots (37 km/h) - their prey, the German U-boats, could only manage 18 knots (33 km/h) on the surface and no more than 8 knots (15 km/h) submerged.

== Service history ==
In the latter part of the war, Pheasant was sent to the Pacific theatre. There she served in a task force with the escort carriers Striker and Ruler from April to August 1945.

After being placed on the disposal list Pheasant was sold for scrap, arriving at Troon for breaking on 15 January 1963.
