= German submarine U-213 =

German World War II submarine

Coordinates: 36°45′N 22°50′W

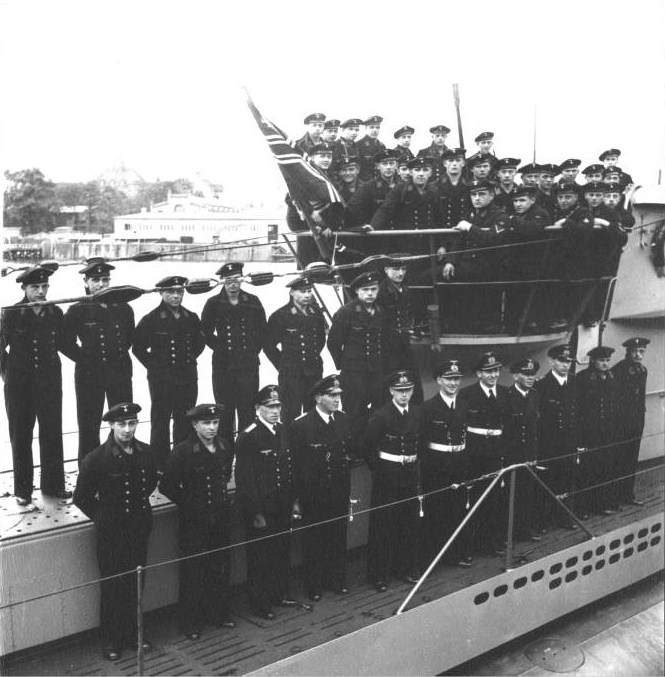
- Crew of U-213

History

Nazi Germany
- Name: U-213
- Ordered: 16 February 1940
- Builder: Germaniawerft, Kiel
- Yard number: 645
- Laid down: 1 October 1940
- Launched: 24 July 1941
- Commissioned: 30 August 1941
- Fate: Sunk on 31 July 1942

General characteristics
- Class & type: Type VIID submarine
- Displacement: 965 tonnes (950 long tons) surfaced; 1,080 t (1,060 long tons) submerged
- Length: 76.90 m (252 ft 4 in) o/a; 59.80 m (196 ft 2 in) pressure hull
- Beam: 6.38 m (20 ft 11 in) o/a; 4.70 m (15 ft 5 in) pressure hull
- Height: 9.70 m (31 ft 10 in)
- Draught: 5.01 m (16 ft 5 in)
- Installed power: 2,800–3,200 PS (2,100–2,400 kW; 2,800–3,200 bhp) (diesels); 750 PS (550 kW; 740 shp) (electric)
- Propulsion: 2 shafts; 2 × diesel engines; 2 × electric motors
- Speed: 16–16.7 knots (29.6–30.9 km/h; 18.4–19.2 mph) surfaced; 7.3 knots (13.5 km/h; 8.4 mph) submerged
- Range: 11,200 nmi (20,700 km; 12,900 mi) at 10 knots (19 km/h; 12 mph) surfaced; 69 nmi (128 km; 79 mi) at 4 knots (7.4 km/h; 4.6 mph) submerged
- Test depth: 200 m (660 ft); Crush depth: 220–240 m (720–790 ft)
- Crew: 4 officers, 40 enlisted
- Armament: 5 × 53.3 cm (21 in) torpedo tubes (four bow, one stern); 12 torpedoes or 26 TMA or 39 TMB tube-launched mines; 5 × vertical launchers with 15 SMA mines; 1 × 8.8 cm (3.46 in) deck gun (220 rounds); 1 × 20 mm AA (4,380 rounds)

Service record
- Part of: 5th U-boat Flotilla; 30 August – 31 December 1941; 1st U-boat Flotilla; 1 January – 30 April 1942; 9th U-boat Flotilla; 1 May – 31 July 1942
- Identification codes: M 01 954
- Commanders: Oblt.z.S. Amelung von Varendorff; 30 August 1941 – 31 July 1942
- Operations: 3 patrols: 1st patrol: a. 26 January – 20 March 1942; b. 23–24 April 1942; 2nd patrol: a. 25 April – 20 June 1942; b. 20–21 June 1942; 3rd patrol: 23–31 July 1942
- Victories: None

German submarine U-213 was a Type VIID mine-laying U-boat of Nazi Germany's Kriegsmarine during World War II.

== Training ==
Laid down on 1 October 1940 by Friedrich Krupp Germaniawerft in Kiel as yard number 645, the boat was launched on 24 July 1941 and commissioned on 30 August with Oberleutnant zur See Amelung von Varendorff in command. She trained with the 5th U-boat Flotilla until 31 December 1941; on 1 January 1942 she was assigned to the 1st U-boat Flotilla. On 1 May 1942 she was assigned to the 9th U-boat Flotilla and spent the rest of her career with that unit.

== Design ==
As one of the six German Type VIID submarines, U-213 had a displacement of 965 tonnes (950 long tons) when at the surface and 1,080 tonnes (1,060 long tons) while submerged. She had a total length of 76.90 m (252 ft 4 in), a pressure hull length of 59.80 m (196 ft 2 in), a beam of 6.38 m (20 ft 11 in), a height of 9.70 m (31 ft 10 in), and a draught of 5.01 m (16 ft 5 in). The submarine was powered by two Germaniawerft F46 supercharged four-stroke, six-cylinder diesel engines producing a total of 2,800 to 3,200 metric horsepower (2,060 to 2,350 kW; 2,760 to 3,160 shp) for use while surfaced, two AEG GU 460/8-276 double-acting electric motors producing a total of 750 shaft horsepower (760 PS; 560 kW) for use while submerged. She had two shafts and two 1.23 m (4 ft) propellers. The boat was capable of operating at depths of up to 230 metres (750 ft).

The submarine had a maximum surface speed of 16–16.7 knots (29.6–30.9 km/h; 18.4–19.2 mph) and a maximum submerged speed of 7.3 knots (13.5 km/h; 8.4 mph). When submerged, the boat could operate for 69 nautical miles (128 km; 79 mi) at 4 knots (7.4 km/h; 4.6 mph); when surfaced, she could travel 11,200 nautical miles (20,700 km; 12,900 mi) at 10 knots (19 km/h; 12 mph). U-213 was fitted with five 53.3 cm (21 in) torpedo tubes (four fitted at the bow and one at the stern), twelve torpedoes, one 8.8 cm (3.46 in) SK C/35 naval gun, 220 rounds, and an anti-aircraft gun, in addition to five mine tubes with fifteen SMA mines. The boat had a complement of between forty-four.

== Service history ==
U-213 carried out three war patrols during her career, ranging into the North Atlantic. One of them included the landing of an Abwehr agent, Alfred Langbein, on the Canadian coast near St. Martins, New Brunswick on 14 May 1942. The mission was termed Operation Grete; Langbein was instructed to report on the sailing of convoys. He failed to accomplish this, and surrendered to the authorities in September 1944 after running out of money. He was released after the end of the war. U-213 was a member of three "wolfpacks" during the war, as part of 'Schlei' from 1 February until 12 February 1942, 'Westwall' from the 2 to 12 March, and 'Pfadfinder' from the 2 to 27 May.

During this period she suffered two attacks, one on 7 February 1942 from the escorts of convoy ON 63, which she was attempting to attack, which left the U-boat slightly damaged after attacks by depth charges; another was when the boat was surprised on the surface by a destroyer in bad weather in the Gulf of Maine, and was again slightly damaged by depth charges on 15 May. U-213 was sunk with all hands on 31 July 1942, while in the North Atlantic, east of the Azores, in a depth charge attack by the British sloops HMS Erne, Rochester and Sandwich.

=== Wolfpacks ===
U-213 took part in three wolfpacks:

- Schlei (1–12 February 1942)
- Westwall (2–12 March 1942)
- Pfadfinder (21–27 May 1942)

== Bibliography ==
- Gröner, Eric; Jung, Dieter; Maass, Martin (1991). German Warships 1815-1945: U-boats and Mine Warfare Vessels. Vol. 2. Translated by Thomas, Keith; Magowan, Rachel. London: Conway Maritime Press. ISBN 0-85177-593-4.
