= HMS Nereide (U64) =

Modified Black Swan-class sloop

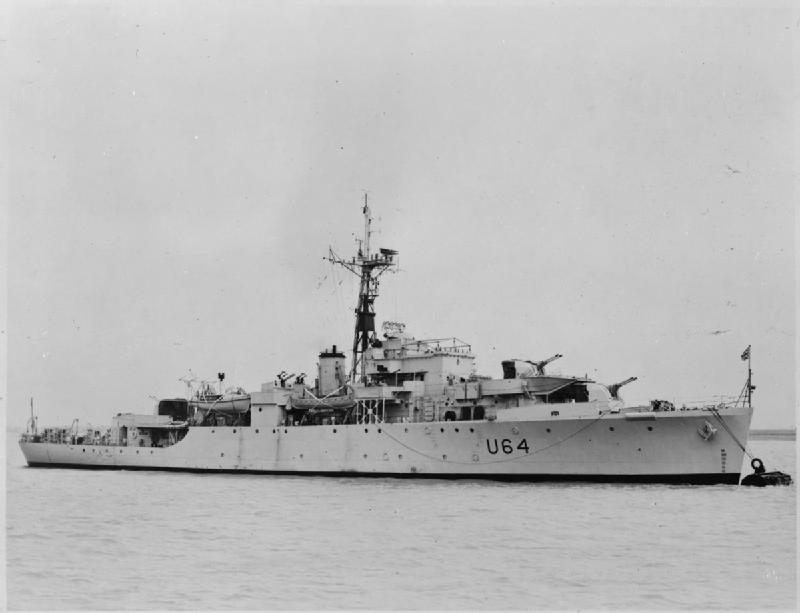
- HMS Nereide anchored on 15 May 1946.

History

United Kingdom
- Name: Nereide
- Namesake: Nereid
- Ordered: 5 October 1942
- Builder: Chatham Dockyard, Kent
- Laid down: 15 February 1943
- Launched: 29 January 1944
- Commissioned: 3 May 1946
- Decommissioned: 1950s
- Identification: Pennant number: U64
- Fate: Scrapped in 1958

General characteristics
- Class & type: Modified Black Swan-class sloop
- Displacement: 1,350 tons
- Length: 283 ft (86 m)
- Beam: 38.5 ft (11.7 m)
- Propulsion: Geared turbines; two shafts
- Speed: 20 knots (37 km/h) at 4,300 hp (3,200 kW)
- Complement: 192 men + 1 Cat
- Armament: 6 × QF 4 in Mk XVI anti-aircraft guns; 12 × 20 mm anti-aircraft guns

HMS Nereide was a modified Black Swan-class sloop of the Royal Navy. She was laid down by Chatham Dockyard, Kent on 15 February 1943, launched on 29 January 1944 and commissioned on 3 May 1946, with the pennant number U64.

== Construction and career ==
Commissioned in 1946, HMS Nereide therefore did not experience the fighting of the Second World War.

She was placed on the destruction list for demolition, Nereide arrived at the demolition site on 18 May 1958.
