= HMS Hart (U58) =

Sloop of the Royal Navy

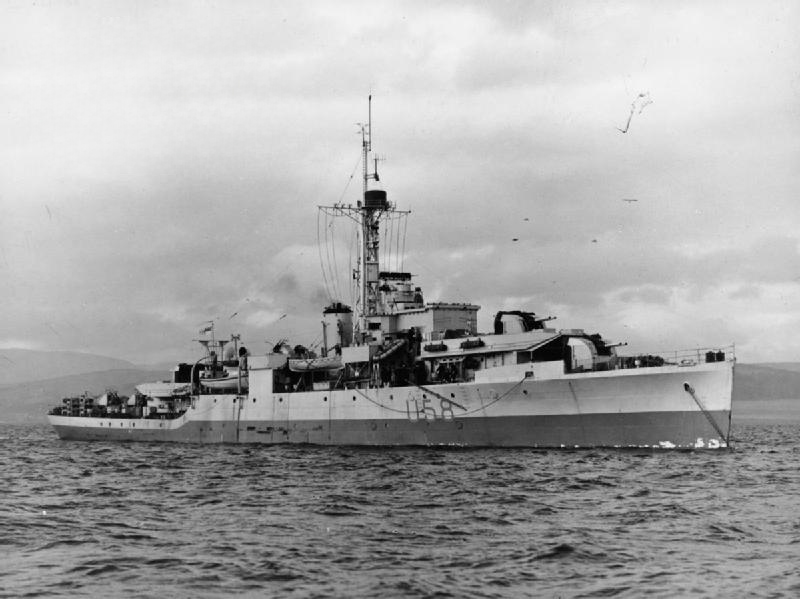
- Hart on the River Cllyde, January 1944

History

United Kingdom
- Name: HMS Hart
- Builder: Alexander Stephen and Sons, Glasgow, Scotland
- Laid down: 27 March 1942
- Launched: 7 July 1943
- Completed: 12 December 1943
- Identification: Pennant number U18/F58
- Honours and awards: ARMADA 1599; CHINA 1900; ATLANTIC 1944-5; ENGLISH CHANNEL 1944; NORMANDY 1944; KOREA 1951
- Fate: Sold to West Germany, 27 April 1959
- Badge: On a Field White, a Hart statant White

History

West Germany
- Name: Scheer
- Acquired: 27 April 1959
- Decommissioned: 1967
- Identification: Pennant number F216
- Fate: Broken up, 1971

General characteristics
- Class & type: Modified Black Swan-class sloop

HMS Hart was a modified Black Swan-class sloop of the Royal Navy. She saw service as a convoy escort during the Second World War, seeing service in the Atlantic, Mediterranean and Far East in 1945. She also took part in the Korean War in 1950 and 1951.

She was sold to Federal Republic of Germany in 1959, where she was renamed Scheer and was used as a radar training ship.

== Construction ==
Hart was built by Alexander Stephen and Sons, Glasgow, Scotland, was laid down on 27 March 1942, launched on 7 July 1943, and completed on 12 December 1943.

She was adopted by the civil town of Hale, then in Cheshire, as part of Warship Week in 1942.

== Royal Navy service ==
In 1944 Hart undertook convoy protection duties in the North Western Approaches and Irish Sea. In March of that year she undertook duties in the Atlantic and Western Mediterranean. She was then nominated as part of the support for the invasion of Normandy, Operation Neptune in June 1944. Following the landings, she continued operations in the English Channel.

In 1945 she undertook convoy defence duties in the Atlantic Ocean. In July 1945 she was allocated for service with the British Pacific Fleet and was at Rabaul on 6 September 1945 for the Surrender of Japan in that area.

Following the war she remained in the Far East and received the new pennant number 'F58'. She was deployed with United Nations Naval forces for service in the Korean War. She returned to Devonport in 1951 and was placed in reserve, before being put on the disposal list.

== West German Navy service ==
In 1957, West Germany purchased seven escorts, including Hart for its newly established Bundesmarine. After refit by Palmers at Jarrow, she was handed over to the Bundesmarine on 27 April 1959, and was renamed Scheer. She was subsequently converted by Seebeck in 1962, for use as a radar training ship and was armed with two bofors guns, in place of the twin 4-inch armament.

She remained operational until 1967 and was scrapped in 1971.

== Publications ==
- Blackman, Raymond V. B. (1971). Jane's Fighting Ships 1971–72. London: Sampson Low, Marston & Company. ISBN 0-354-00096-9.
- Blair, Clay (2000). Hitler's U-Boat War: The Hunted 1942–1945. New York: Modern Library. ISBN 0-679-64033-9.
- Colledge, J. J.; Warlow, Ben (2006) [1969]. Ships of the Royal Navy: The Complete Record of All Fighting Ships of the Royal Navy from the 15th Century to the Present (3rd Rev ed.). London: Chatham Publishing. ISBN 978-1-86176-281-8. OCLC 67375475.
- Gardiner, Robert; Chesneau, Roger (1980). Conway's All The World's Fighting Ships 1922–1946. London: Conway Maritime Press. ISBN 0-85177-146-7.
- Gardiner, Robert; Chumbley, Stephen (1995). Conway's All The World's Fighting Ships 1947–1995. Annapolis, Maryland, USA: Naval Institute Press. ISBN 1-55750-132-7.
- Hague, Arnold (1993). Sloops: A History of the 71 Sloops Built in Britain and Australia for the British, Australian and Indian Navies 1926–1946. Kendal, England: World Ship Society. ISBN 0-905617-67-3.
