= HMS Alacrity (U60) =

Sloop of the Royal Navy

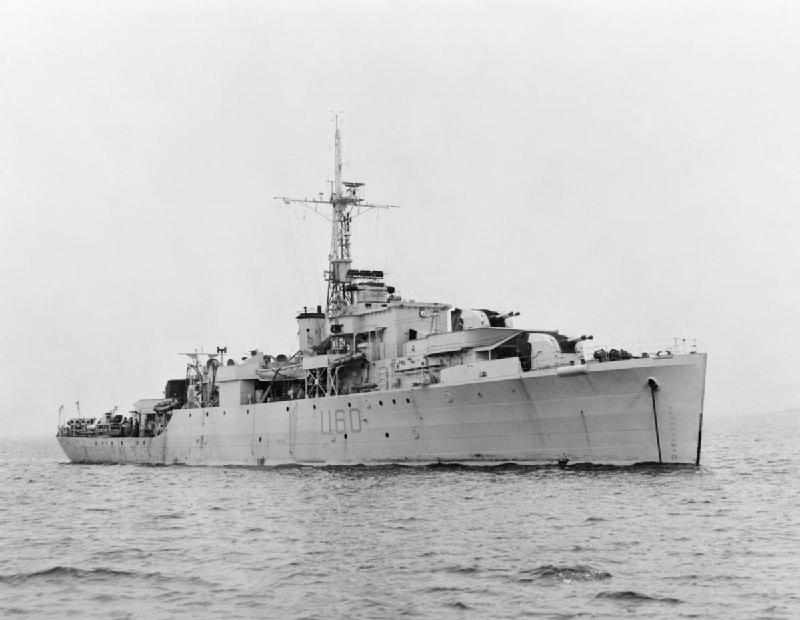
- Alacrity on 10 April 1945 (IWM)

History

United Kingdom
- Name: HMS Alacrity
- Builder: Alexander Stephen and Sons, Glasgow, Scotland
- Laid down: 5 April 1943
- Launched: 1 September 1944
- Completed: 13 April 1945
- Identification: Pennant number U60/F60
- Motto: Adjuvare Propero: 'I hasten to help'
- Honours and awards: CHINA 1900; KOREA 1950-52
- Fate: Sold for scrap, 1956
- Badge: On a Field Silver a heart, Red, winged Gold.

General characteristics
- Class & type: Modified Black Swan-class sloop

HMS Alacrity was a modified Black Swan-class sloop of the Royal Navy. She was built for service as a convoy escort during the Second World War, but was completed too late to see action. She did subsequently take part in the Korean War between 1950 and 1952. She was scrapped in 1956.

== Construction and design ==
Alacrity was one of two Modified-Black Swan-class sloops ordered by the British Admiralty from the Scottish shipbuilder William Denny and Brothers on 12 August 1942 as part of the 1942 shipbuilding programme for the Royal Navy. The ship was laid down at Denny's Dunbarton shipyard on 5 April 1943, was launched on 1 September 1944, and completed on 13 April 1945.

Alacrity was 299 ft 6 in (91.29 m) long overall and 283 ft 0 in (86.26 m) between perpendiculars, with a beam of 38 feet 6 inches (11.73 m) and a draught of 11 ft 4 in (3.45 m) at deep load. Displacement of the Modified Black Swans was 1,350–1,490 long tons (1,370–1,510 t) standard and 1,880–1,950 long tons (1,910–1,980 t) deep load depending on the armament and equipment fitted. Two Admiralty three-drum water-tube boilers provided steam to Parsons geared steam turbines which drove two shafts. The machinery was rated at 4,300 shp (3,200 kW), giving a speed of 19.75 kn (22.73 mph; 36.58 km/h).

The ship's main gun armament (as fitted to all the Modified Black Swans) consisted of 3 twin QF 4 inch (102 mm) Mk XVI guns, in dual purpose mounts, capable of both anti-ship and anti-aircraft use. Close-in anti-aircraft armament varied between the ships of the class, with Alacrity completing with an outfit of 2 twin 40 mm Bofors guns and two single Oerlikon 20 mm cannon. Post war the ship's close-in armament changed to 2 twin and 2 single Bofors guns. Anti-submarine armament consisted of a split Hedgehog anti-submarine mortar, mounted either side of the 'B' 4-inch mount, together with 110 depth charges.

== Royal Navy service ==
On commissioning Alacrity, which was assigned the pennant number U60, completed work up in home waters, before being allocated for service in the Far East with the British Pacific Fleet, sailing for the Pacific via the Mediterranean, where she carried out further training. Alacrity arrived in Colombo after the Surrender of Japan at the end of the War.

Following the war she remained in the Far East and underwent a refit in New Zealand in 1946. She received the new pennant number 'F60' and was part of the 1st Escort Flotilla. In 1949 the Flotilla was designated the 3rd Frigate Flotilla.

In 1950 she was deployed with United Nations Naval forces for service in the Korean War. She returned to Portsmouth in 1952 and was placed in reserve, before being put on the disposal list in 1956.

She was subsequently sold for scrap to W H Arnold Young at Dalmuir and arrived for breaking up there on 15 December 1956.

== Bibliography ==
- Colledge, J. J.; Warlow, Ben (2006) [1969]. Ships of the Royal Navy: The Complete Record of All Fighting Ships of the Royal Navy from the 15th Century to the Present (3rd Rev ed.). London: Chatham Publishing. ISBN 978-1-86176-281-8. OCLC 67375475.
- Critchley, Mike (1992). British Warships Since 1945: Part 5: Frigates. Liskeard, UK: Maritime Books. ISBN 0-907771-13-0.
- Elliott, Peter (1977). Allied Escort Ships of World War II: A complete survey. London: Macdonald and Jane's. ISBN 0-356-08401-9.
- Friedman, Norman (2008). British Destroyers and Frigates: The Second World War and After. Barnsley, UK: Seaforth Publishing. ISBN 978-1-84832-015-4.
- Gardiner, Robert; Chesneau, Roger (1980). Conway's All The World's Fighting Ships 1922–1946. London: Conway Maritime Press. ISBN 0-85177-146-7.
- Gardiner, Robert; Chumbley, Stephen (1995). Conway's All The World's Fighting Ships 1947–1995. Annapolis, Maryland, USA: Naval Institute Press. ISBN 1-55750-132-7.
- Hague, Arnold (1993). Sloops: A History of the 71 Sloops Built in Britain and Australia for the British, Australian and Indian Navies 1926–1946. Kendal, England: World Ship Society. ISBN 0-905617-67-3.
- Hobbs, David (2017). The British Pacific Fleet: The Royal Navy's Most Powerful Strike Force. Barnsley, UK: Seaforth Publishing. ISBN 978-1-5267-0283-8.
