= HMS Vindex (D15) =

1943 Nairana-class escort carrier of the Royal Navy

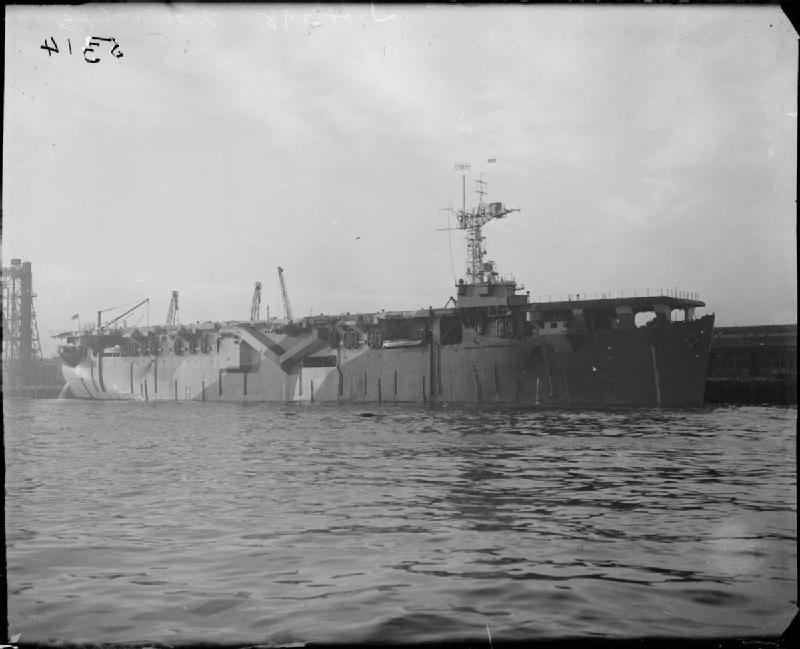
- HMS Vindex

History

United Kingdom
- Name: Vindex
- Builder: Swan Hunter
- Laid down: 1 July 1942
- Launched: 4 May 1943
- Commissioned: 3 December 1943
- Honours and awards: Atlantic; Arctic; Pacific
- Fate: Sold into merchant service as Port Vindex 2 October 1947 and scrapped at Kaohsiung August 1971

General characteristics
- Class & type: Nairana-class escort carrier
- Displacement: 13,455 long tons (13,671 t)
- Length: 524 ft (160 m)
- Beam: 68 ft 6 in (20.88 m)
- Draught: 21 ft (6.4 m)
- Installed power: 11,000 hp (8,200 kW)
- Propulsion: 2 × diesel engines; 2 × propellers
- Speed: 17 kn (20 mph; 31 km/h)
- Complement: 700
- Armament: 2 × 4 in (100 mm) dual purpose guns (1x2); 16 × 2-pounder "Pom Pom" anti-aircraft guns (4x4); 16 × 20 mm (0.79 in) anti-aircraft autocannons (8x2)
- Aircraft carried: 15–20

HMS Vindex (D15) was a Nairana-class escort carrier of the Royal Navy that saw service during the Second World War. She was built at Swan Hunter shipyards in Newcastle upon Tyne. When construction started in 1942 she was intended as a merchant ship, but was completed and launched as an escort carrier, entering service at the end of 1943.

Vindex operated escorting convoys and doing anti-submarine work in the Atlantic and Arctic theatres. Her Swordfish aircraft were involved in the sinking of four U-boats during her service. She survived the war, and immediately afterwards served in the Far East transporting men and material to and from Japan. In 1947, she was decommissioned and sold for commercial use, to Port Line and renamed Port Vindex. In 1971, she was scrapped in Taiwan.

== Design and description ==
The Nairana-class escort carriers were a class of three escort carriers built for the Royal Navy during the Second World War. Escort carriers were designed to protect convoys of merchant ships from U-boat and aircraft attack. Following the successful conversion and operation of HMS Activity, the Admiralty decided to take over three more merchant ships while they were still under construction and convert them into escort carriers. The three ships chosen were being built at three different shipyards Harland and Wolff in Northern Ireland, Swan Hunter in England and John Brown & Company in Scotland. The prototype was built by John Brown who supplied the other two companies with copies of the plans. The three ships were supposed to be identical but in reality they were all slightly different.

HMS Vindex was launched on 4 May 1943 and completed on 3 December 1943. She had a complement of 700 men and displaced 13,455 long tons (13,671 t). Her other dimensions were a length of 524 ft (160 m), a beam of 68 ft 6 in (20.88 m) and a draught of 21 ft (6.4 m). Her aircraft and her aircraft facilities included a 495 ft (151 m) flight deck, a 231 ft × 61 ft (70 m × 19 m) hangar, six arrestor wires, and a 45 ft × 34 ft (14 m × 10 m) aircraft lift.

She had a traditional rivetted hull, steel flight decks and a closed hangar. Propulsion provided by diesel engines connected to two shafts giving 11,000 hp (8,200 kW), which could propel the ship at 17 kn (20 mph; 31 km/h). Her armaments concentrated on anti-aircraft (AA) defence and comprised two 4 in (100 mm) dual purpose guns on a twin mount, sixteen 20 mm (0.79 in) autocannons on eight twin mounts and sixteen 2-pounder "Pom Pom" guns on four quadruple mounts. Aircraft assigned were either anti-submarine or fighter aircraft, which could be made up of a mixture of Hawker Sea Hurricanes, Grumman Martlets or Fairey Swordfish.

== Service history ==
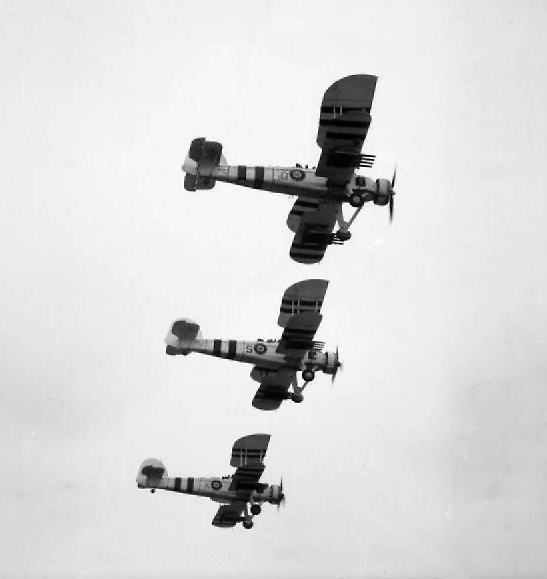
Three Fairey Swordfish armed with RP-3 rockets.

Vindex was commissioned in December 1943, and moved to Gourock for working up. By this stage of the war, the Royal Navy had enough escort carriers available not only to double them up on a convoy escort but to permanently detach one to work with a "hunter killer group" operating outside the convoy system. The 2nd Escort Group still under the command of Captain Frederic John Walker was the group chosen with Vindex as the carrier. As she would not be supported by another carrier Vindex's air group was formed from the experienced 825 Naval Air Squadron, with a complement of 12 Fairey Swordfish Mk IIs and six Sea Hurricanes IICs. Even though there were 12 Swordfish on board they had only eight crews so the Sea Hurricanes carried out some of the daylight anti-submarine patrols. The Sea Hurricanes had been fitted with four racks for the same RP-3 rockets used by the Swordfish to attack submarines.

Leaving Lough Foyle in Northern Ireland on 9 March 1944, the 2nd Escort Group moved to the area believed to hold the highest concentration of U-boats. On the night of 12 March, Swordfish on patrol had 28 contacts on their air to surface vessel radar (ASV). Their first attack was unsuccessful: two depth charges were dropped that failed to explode (believed to be caused by faulty safety clips) and during the attack the rear gunner in the Swordfish was killed by the U-boats anti-aircraft guns. The depth charges were dropped short on a second attack and failed to explode on a third attack during the same night. On the night of 15 March, two Swordfish got an ASV contact ahead of the escort group. Unable to see anything in the darkness, they dropped flares and sea markers over the location. When the escort group arrived they picked up a contact on their ASDIC and the U-653 was sunk. Weather conditions were still not good for flying, and in the following days a Swordfish returning from a night patrol landed in the sea alongside the carrier and the crew were reported missing, believed killed. A pitching deck caused one Swordfish to crash into the sea on take-off and engine failure caused the crash of another Swordfish. One Swordfish clipped the island superstructure, losing 4 ft (1.2 m) off both wing tips when taking off. The pilot managed to get the aircraft into the air, circled around while jettisoning his depth charges, and landed again without mishap. Landing on the heaving deck was just as dangerous as taking off: two Sea Hurricanes and two Swordfish missed the arrestor wires and ended up crashing into the safety barriers.

On 24 March, with its engine shot up and crew injured, a Swordfish attempted to land on Vindex. It crash landed on the flight deck, coming to a stop 8 ft (2.4 m) from the end of the flight deck. Leaking petrol set the wreckage on fire, the crew were rescued, but the fire exploded one of two depth charges stuck on their racks, blowing a 8 ft × 4 ft (2.4 m × 1.2 m) hole in the flight deck. After 16 days at sea, Vindex returned to port. With two days flying lost because of the weather conditions, the Swordfish had amassed a creditable 275 flying hours and 122 deck landings by day and night. The Sea Hurricanes contributed another 47 hours flying and 39 deck landings.

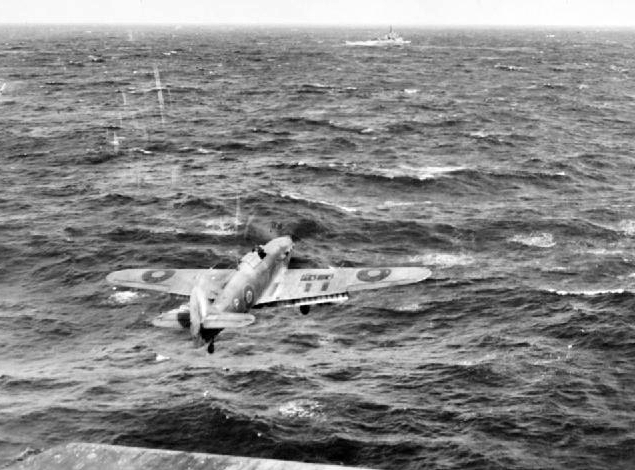
825 Naval Air Squadron Sea Hurricane takes off from HMS Vindex.

At the end of April 1944, Vindex joined the 5th Escort Group. On 6 May, a patrolling Swordfish was contacted by two of the escort frigates reporting they were in contact with a submerged U-boat. The frigates carried out a depth charge attack and forced U-765 to the surface. Despite anti-aircraft fire from the U-boat, the Swordfish dropped two of its depth charges which broke the submarine in half. Flying became dangerous in the heavy seas and poor visibility. One Sea Hurricane was damaged beyond repair after a serious crash into the safety barrier and another crashed into the sea with the loss of the pilot. The Swordfish crews fared little better three aircraft and one crew were lost during the same period. On 9 May, Vindex's aircraft lift broke down with a burnt out motor, the crew had to resort to manually cranking the lift up or down taking an hour to go each way. They eventually repaired the lift by moving the capstan motor through holes burned into the bulkheads. During the second deployment by Vindex her aircraft had flown over 400 sorties in 13 days, but the strain on the aircrews began to show and only 35 per cent of the original Swordfish crews were still with the ship when they returned to port. It was during this second deployment that one of the ships officers, Sub-Lieutenant J.M. Morrison invented a blind landing system soon to be used on all the Royal Navy carriers. He modified an ASV radar set which was placed on the flight deck. The system employed the Air Directing Officer guiding aircraft to within 5 mi (4.3 nmi; 8.0 km) of the ship. They could then be picked up on the ASV and brought in astern of the carrier at a height of 75 ft (23 m).

On 15 August, Vindex and Striker joined convoy JW 59 the first Arctic convoy to Russia of the year. Vindex still had 825 Naval Air Squadron on board but they were now equipped with the Swordfish Mk III. This version of the biplane had a Rocket-assisted take off system (RATOG) and a new ASV radar in a dome on the underside of the aircraft. The extra weight reduced the crew to two, doing away with the Telegraphist-Air-Gunner. There was a full complement of 12 Swordfish and eight Sea Hurricanes (two unassembled spares) on board. The larger Striker had 12 Swordfish and 12 Grumman Wildcats. The Swordfish claimed their first success on 22 August, sinking U-344, followed by U-354 on 24 August. Her rocket armed Sea Hurricanes also claimed a U-boat damaged. Neither convoy JW 59 or the returning RA 59A lost any ships.

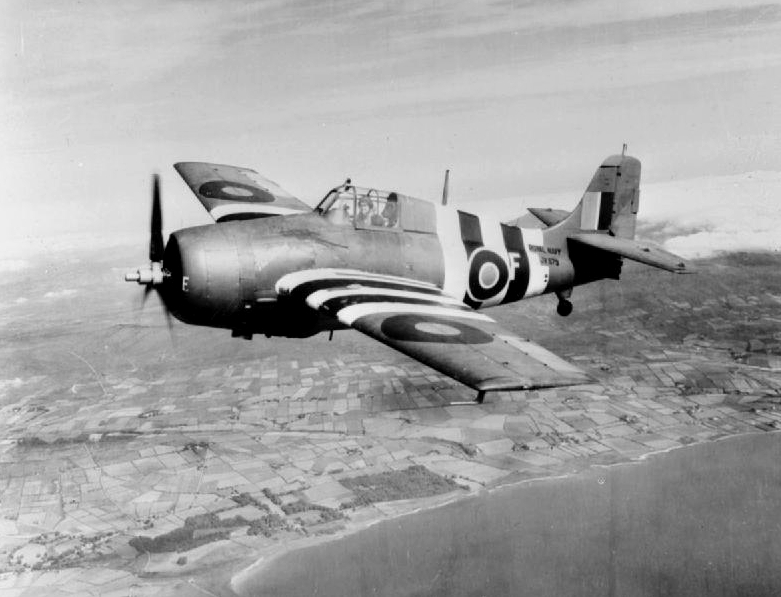
A Fleet Air Arm Grumman Wildcat.

Russian convoy JW 61 which sailed on 20 October had for the first time three escort carriers, Vindex, Nairana and Tracker. This was a large convoy of 62 merchant ships with a large escort group. Vice-Admiral Frederick Dalrymple-Hamilton was in command, with Vindex as his flagship. Nairana had 835 Naval Air Squadron with 14 Swordfish IIIs and six Wildcat VIs on board for what would be their first Arctic convoy. Vindex had a re-formed 811 Naval Air Squadron with the same aircraft types and numbers. The third carrier—Tracker—had 10 Grumman Avengers and six Wildcats. The short Arctic days meant that most flying would be at night. The three carriers worked a system eight hour watches, one would be the duty carrier with its aircraft aloft, the second would be on standby with its aircraft arranged on deck ready to scramble and the third resting. The two Swordfish equipped squadrons because of their better night flying equipment shared the night time hours while Tracker's Avengers worked the daylight hours. The strength of the convoys escort may have deterred the Germans and no U-boats or reconnaissance aircraft were detected, until the convoy approached the Kola Inlet, even then the heavy escort prevented any attack and the convoy reached port safely.

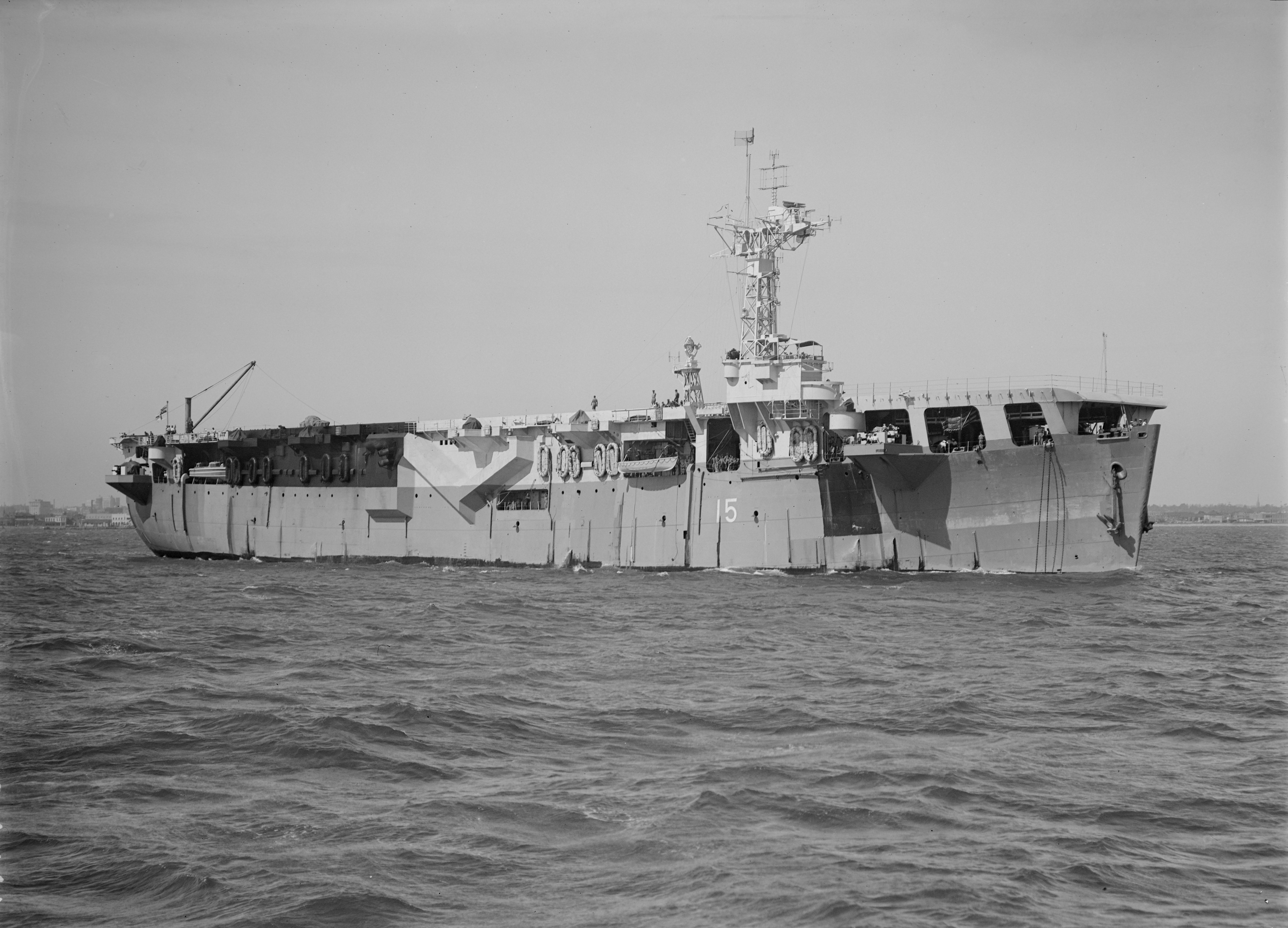
HMS Vindex in December 1945

The return convoy RA 61 was equally as successful, with only one frigate damaged by a torpedo just after leaving Kola, and Vindex had to take avoiding action after detecting a torpedo coming towards her. Vindex's inexperienced squadron lost a Wildcat pilot when his plane crashed into the sea attempting to land back on board. A Swordfish crashed into the sea following a rocket-assisted takeoff, with the loss of the two-man crew. Another Swordfish crashed on landing, with the aircraft initially hung over the ship's side from its tail hook. When the hook gave way it crashed into the sea and only the pilot was rescued. The squadron in total lost or so severely damaged eight Swordfish and two Wildcats that they could not fly again. From March to August 1945 the ship was part of the British Pacific Fleet attached to the 30th Aircraft Carrier Squadron.

With the war over there was no further need for escort carriers. Vindex was sent out to the Far East as the flagship for Rear Admiral Angus Cunninghame Graham. She was used to repatriate prisoners of war from Hong Kong back to Australia and Britain. On her return to Britain, she was placed in reserve and bought by her original owners the Port Line company. They renamed her Port Vindex keeping part of her name to honour her wartime service and converted into a refrigerated cargo ship on the United Kingdom to Australia route. At the end of her merchant career, she was scrapped in August 1971 at Kaohsiung in Taiwan.
