= HMS Peacock (U96) =

Sloop of the Royal Navy

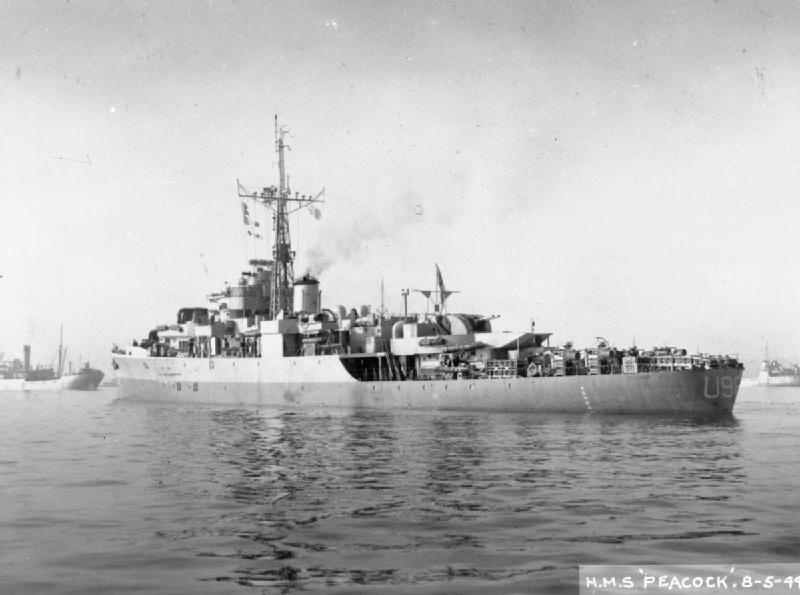
- Peacock in 1945 (IWM) A 30695

History

United Kingdom
- Name: HMS Peacock
- Builder: Thornycroft, Woolston, Hampshire
- Laid down: 29 November 1942
- Launched: 11 December 1943
- Completed: 10 May 1944
- Identification: Pennant number U96/F96
- Honours and awards: ARCTIC 1944; ATLANTIC 1945
- Fate: Sold for scrap, 1958
- Badge: On a Field White, upon a pedestal Black, a Peacock Proper

General characteristics
- Class & type: Modified Black Swan-class sloop

HMS Peacock was a modified Black Swan-class sloop of the Royal Navy. She was built for service as a convoy escort during the Second World War, serving in the arctic and Atlantic convoys. After the Second World War she saw service in the Mediterranean. She was scrapped in 1958.

== Construction ==
Peacock was built by Thornycroft, Woolston, and was laid down on 29 November 1942, launched on 11 December 1943, and completed on 10 May 1944. She was adopted by the civil community of Tadcaster Rural District Council in the West Riding of Yorkshire as part of the Warship Week National Savings campaign in 1942.

== Royal Navy service ==
Under the command of Lt.Cdr. Richard Stannard, VC, DSO, RD, RNR, upon commissioning, Peacock completed work ups in home waters. In August 1944 she was allocated for service with the Arctic convoys to Russia. By December 1944, she was allocated for the defence of the Atlantic Convoys. During these operations she took part in the sinking of several U-Boats.

In May 1945, she was allocated for service with the British Pacific Fleet but was transferred to the Mediterranean Fleet as the war drew to a close.

Following the war she remained in the Mediterranean. She received the new pennant number 'F96' and was based in Malta, as part of the 3rd Frigate Flotilla. This Flotilla took part in patrols preventing illegal Jewish immigration into Mandatory Palestine. In June 1953, she attended the Coronation Review at Spithead. In 1954 she was placed in reserve.

She was subsequently sold for scrap and arrived for breaking up at Rosyth on 7 May 1958.
