= List of public art in the London Borough of Hackney =

This is a list of public art in the London Borough of Hackney.

== Dalston ==
Image	Title / subject	Location and coordinates	Date	Artist / designer	Type	Designation	Notes
	Shacklewell Green War Memorial	Shacklewell Lane 51.5531°N 0.0697°W	1920	?	War memorial	Grade II	
	Hackney Peace Carnival Mural	13 Dalston Lane	1985	Mick Jones and Ann Walker after Ray Walker	Mural	—N/a	

== Hackney Central ==
Image	Title / subject	Location and coordinates	Date	Artist / designer	Type	Designation	Notes
	Esther Nelson Memorial Drinking Fountain	St Thomas's Square 51.5420°N 0.0551°W	1912	?	Drinking fountain	Grade II	Unveiled 31 October 1912.
	Custard Apple (Annonaceae), Breadfruit (Moraceae) and Soursop (Annonaceae) Memorial to the Windrush generation	Narrow Way, near St Augustine's Tower 51.5476°N 0.0546°W	2021	Veronica Ryan	Sculptures	—N/a	Unveiled 1 October 2021. The three sculptures represent Caribbean fruits and vegetables, in reference to the nearby Ridley Road Market.
	Warm Shores	Outside Hackney Town Hall	2022	Thomas J. Price	Statues	—N/a	Unveiled 23 June 2022 (Windrush Day). Two figures, of a man and a woman, based on composites of 30 residents of Hackney from the Windrush generation or descended from it.

== Hackney Downs ==
Image	Title / subject	Location and coordinates	Date	Artist / designer	Type	Designation	Notes
More images	Mosaics	Hackney Downs Pavilion	2014	Hackney Mosaic Project	Mosaics	—N/a	

== Hackney Marshes ==
Image	Title / subject	Location and coordinates	Date	Artist / designer	Type	Designation	Notes
	Water Jugglers	Hackney Marshes 51.5560°N 0.0356°W	2004	Peter Dunn	Sculpture	—N/a	

== Hackney Wick ==
Image	Title / subject	Location and coordinates	Date	Artist / designer	Type	Designation	Notes
	War memorial	St Mary of Eton	After 1918	?	Crucifix		
	Boulder	Mabley Green 51.5490°N 0.0326°W	2008	John Frankland	Sculpture	—N/a	

== Haggerston ==
Image	Title / subject	Location and coordinates	Date	Artist / designer	Type	Designation	Notes
	War memorial	All Saints' churchyard, Livermere Road 51.5391°N 0.0737°W	c. 1920	?	Memorial cross	Grade II	
	Haggerston Road School War Memorial	Stonebridge Common, at the junction of Haggerston Road and Mayfield Road 51.5399°N 0.07466°W	1921	?	Obelisk	—N/a	The school was demolished in the 1930s.
	The Elliptical Switchback	Haggerston railway station	2010	Tod Hanson	Ceramic mural	—N/a	Commemorates the astronomer Edmond Halley, who was born in Haggerston. The first permanent artwork commissioned by the London Overground.

== Homerton ==
Image	Title / subject	Location and coordinates	Date	Artist / designer	Type	Designation	Notes
	Homerton War Memorial	St Barnabas' churchyard, facing Homerton High Street 51.5487°N 0.0426°W	1919	?	Celtic cross	Grade II	

== Hoxton ==
Image	Title / subject	Location and coordinates	Date	Artist / designer	Type	Designation	Notes
More images	North London Railway War Memorial	Hoxton railway station 51.5315°N 0.0758°W	1921	Reginald Wynn Owen	Cenotaph	Grade II	Unveiled 10 February 1921 at Broad Street railway station; reinstalled in the car park of Richmond station in 1989, and on this site in 2011.
	Juggling Figure	Hoxton Market	1994	Simon Stringer	Statue	—N/a	
	Dripping Flowers	71 Fanshaw Street 51.5300°N 0.0804°W	2019	Nerone	Mural	—N/a	
	Holding Hands	Hoxton Square	2020	Stik	Sculpture	—N/a	
More images	Sharks!	Regent's Canal	2020	Antepavilion	Sculpture	—N/a	Subject of a planning dispute with Hackney London Borough Council

== Lea Bridge ==
Image	Title / subject	Location and coordinates	Date	Artist / designer	Type	Designation	Notes
More images	Nature's Throne	Middlesex Filter Beds Nature Reserve 51.56125°N 0.04385°W	1990	Paula Haughney	Sculpture	—N/a	Made of granite blocks from a former engine house
	Friendship Tree	Millfields 51.56332°N 0.04768°W	2008	Joel Parkes and pupils of Southwold Primary School	Sculpture	—N/a	

== London Fields ==
Image	Title / subject	Location and coordinates	Date	Artist / designer	Architect / other	Type	Designation	Notes
	Saint Michael Slaying the Dragon	Church of St Michael and All Angels	c. 1959–1960	John Hayward	Nugent Cachemaille-Day	Architectural sculpture	Grade II	
	Flower Sellers	Southern end of London Fields park 51.5382°N 0.0600°W	1988	Freeform Arts Trust	—N/a	Mosaic sculpture	—N/a	Restored in 2018.

== Shoreditch ==
Image	Title / subject	Location and coordinates	Date	Artist / designer	Type	Designation	Notes
	Drinking fountain	Great Eastern Street, at the junction of Paul Street and Tabernacle Street 51.5259°N 0.0839°W	1880	A. Nicholson	Columnar drinking fountain	Grade II	
More images	Statue of Robert Geffrye	Museum of the Home, Kingsland Road 51.5318°N 0.0764°W	1913 (after an original of 1723)	After John Nost	Statue in niche	Grade I	
More images	Hackney War Memorial	Churchyard of St John-at-Hackney 51.5497°N 0.0536°W	1921	Joseph Hermon Cawthra	Pillar/obelisk with sculpture	Grade II	
	Javelin Thrower	Shoreditch Park	1980	Constance Freedman	Sculpture	—N/a	
	Hitchcock's Reel	Shoreditch Park (formerly Leonard Street / St Paul Street)	1996	John Edwards	Sculpture	—N/a	
	Master of Suspense Alfred Hitchcock	Gainsborough Studios, Poole Street 51.5359°N 0.0887°W	2001	Antony Donaldson	Sculpture	—N/a	
	Scary	Rivington Street, under railway bridge 51.5263°N 0.0787°W	2007	Ben Eine	Street art	—N/a	Repainted 2019.
	Boulder	Shoreditch Park 51.5345°N 0.0867°W	2008	John Frankland	Sculpture	—N/a	
	Don't Shoot	Rivington Street, west of East London Line viaduct 51.5262°N 0.0789°W	2014	Bambi	Stencil	—N/a	
	The Restless Course	Corner of Scrutton Street and Clifton Street 51.5233°N 0.08298°W	2018	Pritchard Themis	Clock	—N/a	
	Statue of William Shakespeare	New Inn Broadway	2020	Hayley Gibbs and Raphael Maklouf	Bench statue	—N/a	Located near the site of the Theatre, the Elizabethan playhouse at which Romeo and Juliet was first performed.
	Queensbridge Sculpture	Queensbridge Road/Regent's Canal 51.5360°N 0.0701°W	?	Joel Parkes	Sculpture	—N/a	

== South Hackney ==
Image	Title / subject	Location and coordinates	Date	Artist / designer	Type	Designation	Notes
More images	War memorial	Churchyard of St John of Jerusalem's Church, Lauriston Road 51.5402°N 0.0465°W	1921	?	Memorial cross	Grade II	Unveiled 22 October 1921.

== Stoke Newington ==
Image	Title / subject	Location and coordinates	Date	Artist / designer	Type	Designation	Notes
More images	Statue of Isaac Watts	Abney Park Cemetery 51.5637°N 0.0774°W	1845	Edward Hodges Baily	Statue	Grade II	
	War memorial	Churchyard of St Mary's New Church 51.5609°N 0.0848°W	1920	Charles Marriott Oldrid Scott	Memorial cross	Grade II	Unveiled 11 October 1920.
	Bust of Edgar Allan Poe	Stoke Newington Church Street	2011	Ralph Perrott	Bust	—N/a	
	Tree sculpture	Clissold Park 51.55899°N 0.08968°W				—N/a	

== See also ==
- The Towers of Hackney (1970s – 2009)

== Bibliography ==
- Kershman, Andrew (2013). London's Monuments. London: Metro Publications.
