= Listed buildings in Bootle =

Bootle is a town in Sefton, Merseyside, England. It contains 18 buildings that are recorded in the National Heritage List for England as designated listed buildings, Of these, one is listed at Grade I, the highest of the three grades, one is at Grade II*, the middle grade, and the others are at Grade II, the lowest grade. Bootle was a bathing resort in the early 19th century. Between 1860 and 1900 its population increased nearly ten-fold, due to the building of the Leeds and Liverpool Canal and the extension of the docks. Before this time, the only listed buildings are those relating to a shooting lodge of the Earl of Derby. The main civic buildings, most of which are no longer used for their original purposes, date from the later years of the 19th century. The other listed buildings are churches, buildings associated with the docks, a statue, and a war memorial.

== Key ==
Grade	Criteria
I	Buildings of exceptional interest, sometimes considered to be internationally important
II*	Particularly important buildings of more than special interest
II	Buildings of national importance and special interest

== Buildings ==
Name and location	Photograph	Date	Notes	Grade
Old Hall; 53.44906°N 2.98453°W		1773	Originally a shooting box of the Earl of Derby, later used as an office. It is in brick with stone dressings and a stone-slate roof. The building has two storeys and four bays. In front of the first two bays is a verandah, the third bay has a gabled porch, and in the fourth bay is a bay window. The ground floor windows are sashes, and in the upper floor they are casements. A rainwater head contains the Derby crest and the date.	II
1 Merton Road; 53.44908°N 2.98433°W		Late 18th century	A stone house with a stone-slate roof, originally the kitchen wing to a shooting box of the Earl of Derby. It is in two storeys and four bays, and has a central Tudor arched entrance with a keystone. The windows have wedge lintels and contain sash windows, some of which are horizontally-sliding.	II
Christ Church; 53.44883°N 2.98274°W		1866	A church designed by Slater and Carpenter in red sandstone with yellow stone banding and with a slate roof. It consists of a nave with a clerestory, north and south aisles, a chancel with a canted end, a north vestry and a south chapel, and a west steeple. The steeple has a tower with a porch, a clock face, pinnacles, and a broach spire. The windows are lancets.	II
Former Bootle Borough Hospital; 53.4454°N 3.0000°W		1870–72	The hospital was designed by C. O. Ellison, and an additional wing was added by him in 1885–87. It is built in red brick, with dressings in sandstone, and blue brick, and has slate roofs. A nurses' home in Edwardian Baroque style was added in 1915, followed by an outpatients' department in Neo-Georgian style in 1932. The hospital finally closed in 1974, and parts of it have been since used as laboratories and offices.	II
Castree Bros Warehouse; 53.45004°N 3.00358°W		Late 19th century	Originally the foundry of Harland and Wolff, later used as a warehouse. It in common brick with dressings in red and blue brick and in stone. The building has two storeys and a front of 32 bays. Features include cart entrances, gables and gablets with finials, blind windows, and inscribed panels.	II
Langton Dock Pumphouse; 53.44412°N 3.00733°W		1879	The pumphouse is built in common brick with dressings in red and blue brick and in stone. It has a hipped slate roof, is in three storeys, and has a single-storey four-bay engine house at the rear. The west face of the main block has three bays and contains an entrance. On the right corner is a round tower with a machicolated cornice, an octagonal timber top stage with louvred openings, and a pyramidal cap. Along the sides are five bays, the middle storey containing round windows.	II
Town Hall; 53.44558°N 2.99446°W		1882	The town hall by John Johnson is in sandstone with slate roofs. It has two storeys with attics, and an eight-bay front. In the first bay, above four ground floor windows are panels containing the arms of Lancashire towns. Over this is a large round-headed window and a pediment. The second bay has a doorway with a Corinthian aedicule, and at the top is a two-stage clock tower with a short spire, an octagonal cupola, and finials. In the next three bays are pedimented dormers, the third of these bays projecting forward. The wall in front of the town hall is included in the listing.	II
Warehouse, 6 Effingham Street; 53.44284°N 3.00023°W	—	1884	The warehouse has a fireproof cast iron frame, lined internally in concrete, and encased externally in red brick, with polychrome brick dressings. It has seven storeys and a basement. The front facing Effingham Street has four bays, two of them being loading bays with sheet-iron loading doors. The windows have cast iron frames and sheet-iron shutters. Towards the top of the front is an oculus and the remains of a sandstone cornice.	II
Warehouse, 12 Effingham Street; 53.44300°N 2.99935°W	—	c. 1884	The warehouse has a fireproof cast iron frame, lined internally in concrete, and encased externally in red brick, with polychrome brick dressings. It has six storeys and a basement. The front facing Effingham Street has four bays, two of them being loading bays with sheet-iron loading doors. The windows have cast iron frames and sheet-iron shutters. Towards the top of the front is an oculus, a sandstone cornice, and a brick parapet.	II
St James' Church; 53.45580°N 2.99716°W		1884–86	A Roman Catholic church designed by Charles Hadfield, and completed by his son, M. E. Hadfield. It is built in sandstone with a slate roof, and consists of a nave with a clerestory, north and south aisles, a chancel with north and south chapels, and a southwest tower. The tower contains a porch, it is square at the bottom, and has an octagonal top stage with octagonal pinnacles, gargoyles and an embattled parapet.	II
Former Library and Museum; 53.44530°N 2.99434°W		1887	Originally a library and museum by John Johnson, later used as offices. The building is in sandstone with a slate roof, in two storeys and five bays. In the first bay is a round-headed entrance above which is an entablature on consoles with an inscribed panel in a segmental pediment. The parapet at the top of the bay contains a roundel above which are two carved reclining figures. Each of the other bays contains a two-light window with a round tympanum containing roundels. Above these are panels, over which is a panelled frieze. At the top of the building is a parapet with finials. In front of the building is a low wall with lamp standards; these are included in the listing.	II
Former School Board Office; 53.44500°N 2.99342°W		1888	An office by Thomas Cox in Queen Anne style. It is in brick with sandstone dressings and a Welsh slate roof. The building is in two storeys with an attic. The north face is in two parts. The left part contains an entrance, a balcony with a carved parapet, mullioned and transomed windows, and a Flemish gable. The right side projects slightly forward, contains similar windows, and has a roof giving the appearance of a squat tower with a finial.	II
Former Swimming Baths; 53.44500°N 2.99342°W		1888	The former public baths by George Heaton are in Jacobean Revival style. Built in stone with a slate roof, they have a two-storey five-bay central block flanked by single-story two bay wings. The central bay is canted, and is flanked on the ground floor by round-headed entrances. At the top of the central and outer bays are panels with pediments and scrolls. Running beneath them is a cornice and a parapet with ball finials.	II
Former Police Station; 53.44502°N 2.99428°W		1890	The former police station by C. J. Anderson is in sandstone with slate roofs. It has two storeys and ten bays. The third bay projects and contains an elliptical-headed entrance with an open pediment and the royal arms. The bay rises to form a short tower with a frieze, a pierced parapet, pinnacles, and a tented pavilion roof. Over the ninth bay is a pedimented tympanum containing the Bootle arms and mermaids. Most of the windows are sashes. In front of the building is a low wall with lamp standards; these are included in the listing.	II
Former Fire Station; 53.45067°N 2.99995°W		1902	The former fire station is in brick with stone dressings. Its main block is in two storeys and nine bays; to the left is a block of three bays, with two storeys and an attic, and at the rear is a tower. Along the main block are eight wide entrances with Doric antae, and above are sash windows. The first bay of the block to the left is gabled with a segmental pediment. The windows in this block are also sashes.	II
Statue of Edward VII; 53.44424°N 2.98816°W		1902–04	The statue stands in Kings Park, and was sculpted by George Wade. It was erected to commemorate the Coronation of King Edward VII, and contains a bronze figure of Edward VII dressed as a field marshal, wearing a crown and a cloak, and holding the orb and sceptre. The figure stands on a granite pedestal with four fluted pilasters, itself on four octagonal steps.	II
Former Post Office; 53.44487°N 2.99421°W		1905	The former post office is in stone with a slate roof and has two storeys. There are five bays facing Oriel Road, three facing Balliol Road, and a canted corner bay. On each front one bay projects forward and is pedimented. The corner bay contains a round-headed entrance flanked by Ionic columns. Above this the bay is bowed and contains three windows between Tuscan colonnettes, over which is an entablature and a cupola with an obelisk finial.	II
War Memorial; 53.44454°N 2.98833°W		1920–22	The war memorial is in Stanley Park, and was carved by Herman Cawthra. It consists of the figures of a mother and child standing on top of a triangular obelisk, surrounded by the figures of a soldier, a sailor, and an airman. These all stand on a base with twelve sides divided by pilasters, and this stands on two circular steps. The figures are in bronze, and the rest of the memorial is in stone from the Forest of Dean.	II*
St Monica's Church; 53.45390°N 2.97970°W		1935–36	A Roman Catholic church by F. X. Velarde in brick with a green pantile roof. It consists of a nave with aisles, a chancel with a north chapel, and a broad west tower with a narthex. The buttresses on the sides rise above the roofs and are pierced by an arch. The windows are mullioned and transomed, each light being arched. On the tower, above the windows, are three angels carved by H. Tyson Smith.	I
