= Headington Shark =

Sculpture of a shark embedded in a house

Coordinates: 51.75882°N 1.213238°W

Untitled 1986
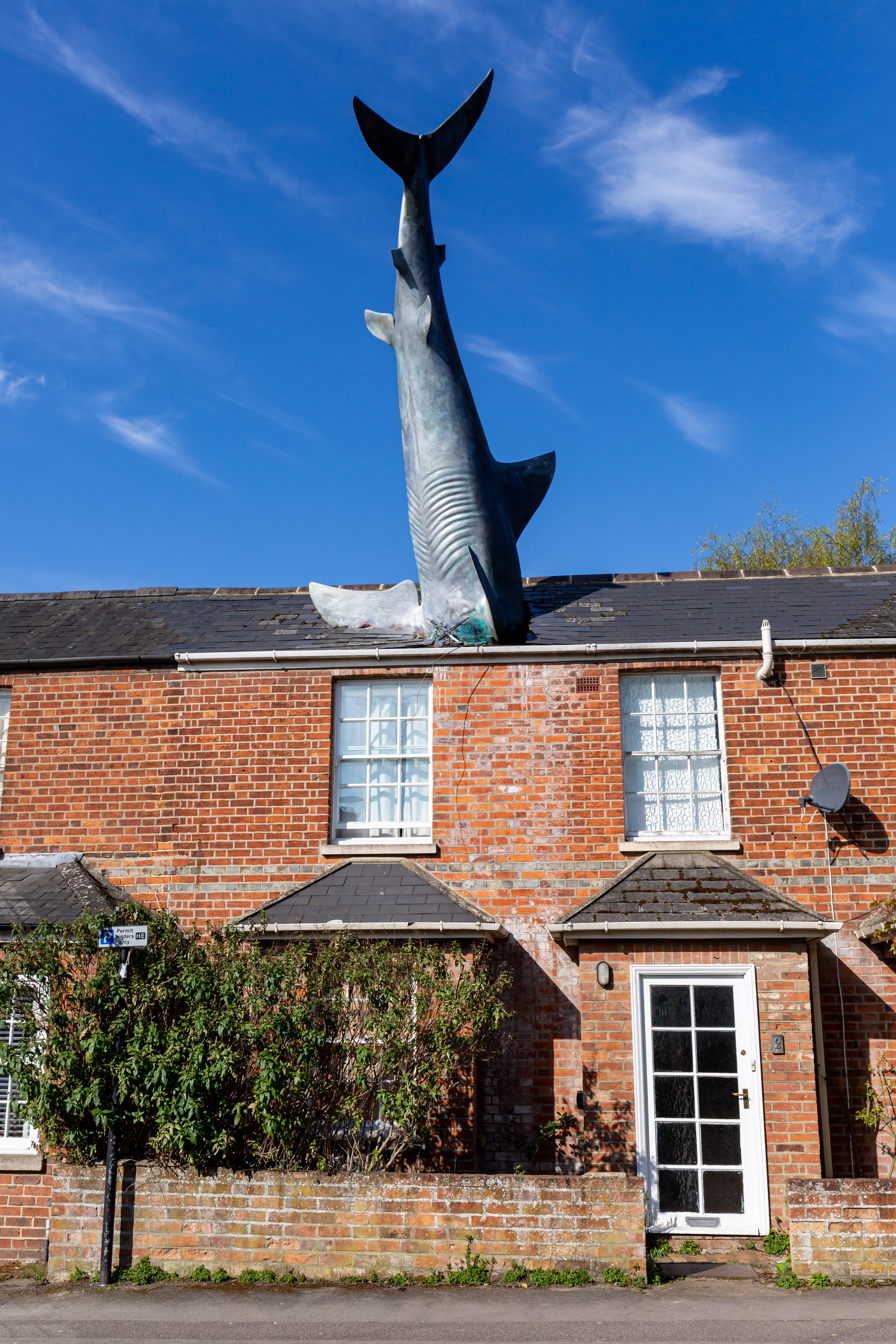
- The Headington Shark in 2021
- Artist: John Buckley
- Year: 1986
- Type: Sculpture
- Medium: Painted fibreglass
- Dimensions: 7.6 m (25 ft)
- Location: Headington, Oxford

Untitled 1986, commonly known as the Headington Shark, is a rooftop sculpture located at 2 New High Street, Headington, Oxford, England, depicting a large shark embedded head-first in the roof of a house. It was protest art, put up without permission, to be symbolic of bombs crashing into buildings.

== Description and location ==
The shark first appeared on 9 August 1986 on the roof of the house of Bill Heine, an American-born radio presenter. He and sculptor John Buckley came up with the idea while drinking wine on the street, and imagined the shark as a metaphor for falling bombs, specifically from the American warplanes that flew overhead on their way to bomb Libya.

The shark was designed, created, and installed by sculptor John Buckley alongside Anton Castiau, a local carpenter and friend of Buckley. Heine said, "The shark was to express someone feeling totally impotent and ripping a hole in their roof out of a sense of impotence and anger and desperation... It is saying something about CND, nuclear power, Chernobyl and Nagasaki". The sculpture was erected on the 41st anniversary of the dropping of the Fat Man atomic bomb on Nagasaki.

The painted fibreglass sculpture weighs 4 long hundredweight (200 kg; 450 lb), is 25 feet (7.6 m) long, and is named Untitled 1986 (written on the gate of the house). It took three months to build. The structure is in deliberate contrast with its otherwise ordinary suburban setting.

For the occasion of the shark's 21st anniversary in August 2007, it was renovated by the sculptor following earlier complaints about the condition of the sculpture and the house.

On 26 August 2016, Heine's son Magnus Hanson-Heine bought the house in order to preserve the shark. In July 2017, Bill Heine was diagnosed with leukaemia; he died on 2 April 2019. The property has been run as an Airbnb guesthouse since 2018. Magnus also runs a website for general information and inquiries about the shark.

In 2022, the Oxford City Council made the sculpture a heritage site for its "special contribution" to the community, despite objection by Hanson-Heine, who stated, "Using the planning apparatus to preserve a historical symbol of planning law defiance is absurd."

== Council opposition ==
The shark was controversial, and became the subject of a six-year battle between Oxford City Council and homeowner Bill Heine. The council attempted to remove the shark on the grounds of safety, and then argued for its removal due to lack of proper planning permission, offering to host it at the local swimming pool instead. However, there was much local support for the shark, and official government records describe June Whitehouse as having "decided that the shark was unique and brilliant". In 1992, the matter was taken to the central government, and Tony Baldry, a minister in the Department of the Environment, ruled on planning grounds that the shark was allowed to remain because it did not do harm to the visual amenity. In an official ruling that has since gained legendary status among town planners for its defence of art, Michael Heseltine's planning inspector, Peter MacDonald, acknowledged that the shark was "not intended to be in harmony" with its surroundings, and addressed the council's concerns about potential "proliferation with sharks (and heaven knows what else) crashing through roofs all over the city." He wrote: "This fear is exaggerated. In the five years since the shark was erected, no other examples have occurred ... any system of control must make some small place for the dynamic, the unexpected, the downright quirky. I therefore recommend that the Headington Shark be allowed to remain."

In 2016, the Oxford City Council began efforts to protect the shark by placing it on a list controlled by Historic England. Heine's son, who took over maintenance, told the New Yorker, "I think Dad would have liked to see it listed, but, at the same time, it’s strange that the council could force you to keep it, just as they tried to force you to remove it". In 2018, as Heine's health was declining, Buckley repainted the shark with a gold leaf on its fin, "to send him up to Heaven".

== Media appearances ==
In 2011, Bill Heine published a short book called "The Hunting of the Shark".

In 2013, the sculpture was the subject of an April Fools' Day story in the Oxford Mail, which announced the establishment by Oxford City Council of a fictitious £200,000 fund to support the creation of similar sculptures on the roofs of other homes in the area.

In 2018, students from Oxford Brookes University created a magazine called The Shark, inspired by the Headington Shark.

Local woman June Whitehouse, who initially supported the shark as "unique and brilliant", collected press clippings into eleven folders she dubbed the "Sharkive": coverage of the shark's street-wide birthday parties, a Czech schoolbook that mentioned it, and a book titled "Eccentric Britain" featuring it on the cover, as well as many media mentions. Foreign visitors frequently asked to study the materials, Whitehouse said, including a Japanese professor who stayed for four hours.

== See also ==
- Cardiff Kook, a 2007 sculpture in California which had a shark added to it
- The Physical Impossibility of Death in the Mind of Someone Living, 1991 shark-based artwork by Damien Hirst
- Sharks!, a 2020 sculpture in London
