= Ultimate Picture Palace =

Cinema in east Oxford, England

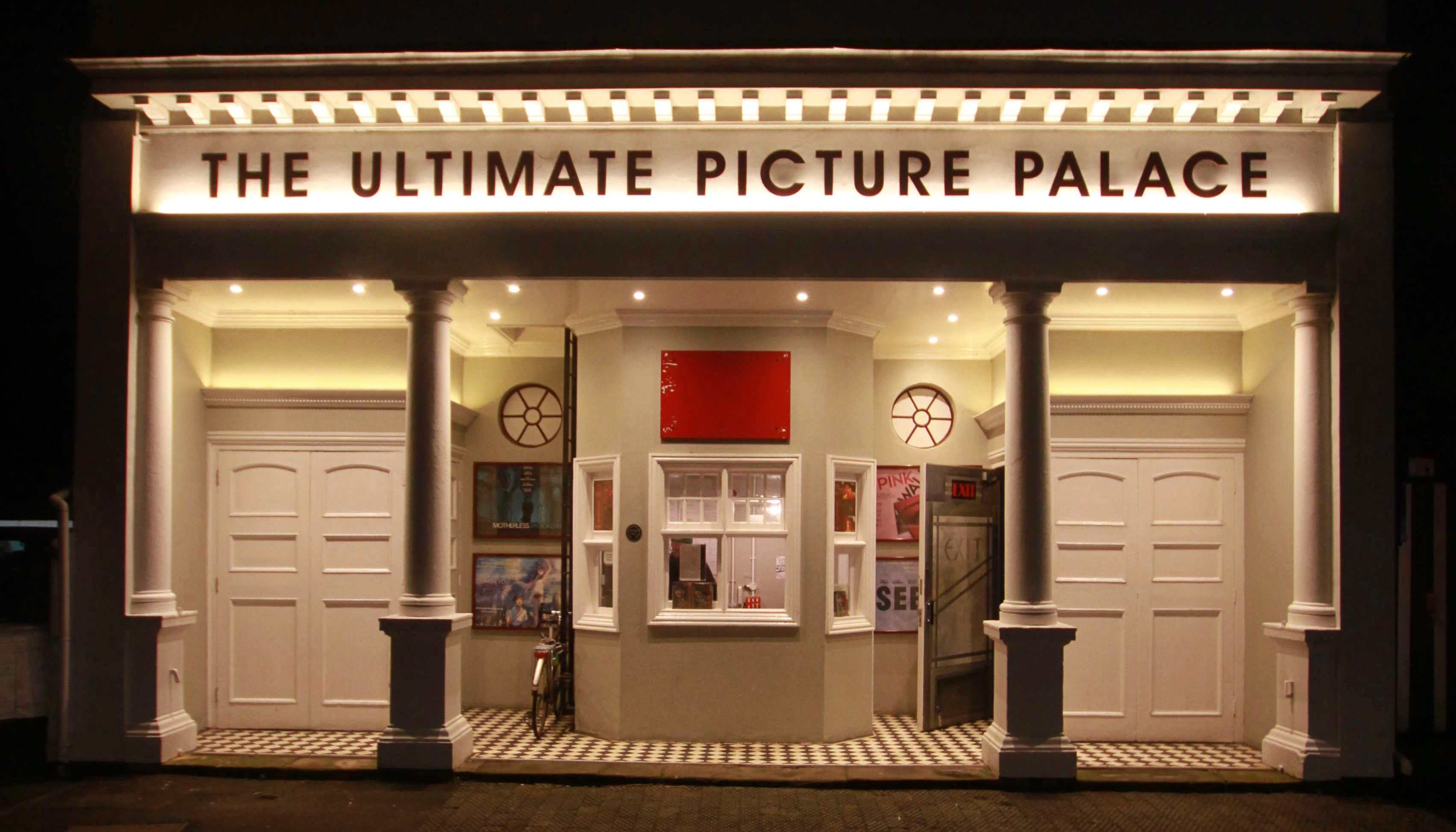
- Front of the Ultimate Picture Palace at night
- Interactive map of Ultimate Picture Palace
- Former names: Oxford Picture Palace (1911–17) Penultimate Picture Palace (1976–94) Section 6 Cinema (1994)
- Address: Jeune Street, Oxford OX4 1BN
- Location: East Oxford, off Cowley Road
- Coordinates: 51.748704°N 1.239333°W
- Type: independent cinema
- Events: independent films, World cinema, repertory cinema
- Public transit: Oxford Bus Co 5, U5 Stagecoach buses 1, 10, 12 Thames Travel bus 11

Construction
- Groundbreaking: 1910
- Built: 1910–11
- Opened: 24 February 1911; 115 years ago
- Renovated: 1976, 1994–96, 2014
- Closed: 1917–76, 1994–96

Website
- uppcinema.com

Listed Building – Grade II
- Official name: Penultimate Picture Palace
- Criteria: Rare surviving example of a simple early cinema
- Designated: 23 September 1994
- Part of: Grouped with the Elm Tree pub next door
- Reference no.: 1278732

The Ultimate Picture Palace is an independent cinema in Oxford, England. It is Oxford's only surviving independent cinema, showing a mixture of independent, mainstream, foreign language, and classic films.

The cinema has been a Grade II listed building since 1994.

== History ==
Frank Stuart opened Oxford's first cinema, the Electric Theatre, in Castle Street, in 1910. He was the licensee of the Elm Tree pub on the corner of Cowley Road and Jeune Street. Also in 1910 work started to build Stuart's second cinema on land in Jeune Street behind the Elm Tree. It opened on 24 February 1911 as the Oxford Picture Palace.

In 1917 the manager was conscripted to serve in the First World War. The cinema was closed and stood unused for many years before being turned into a furniture warehouse.

In 1976 Bill Heine and Pablo Butcher reopened the cinema as the Penultimate Picture Palace. They added a sculpture of Al Jolson's hands by John Buckley to the façade. The first film to be shown was Winstanley. Under the new management the cinema gained a reputation for showing an eclectic and provocative range of films that set it apart from the mainstream cinemas of the time.

In 1994 Heine closed the Penultimate Picture Palace. For a month that summer it was squatted by the Oxford Freedom Network, which reopened it as Studio 6 Cinema. Then brothers Saied and Zaid Marham bought it and spent £40,000 restoring the neoclassical façade. They reopened it as the Ultimate Picture Palace in June 1996.

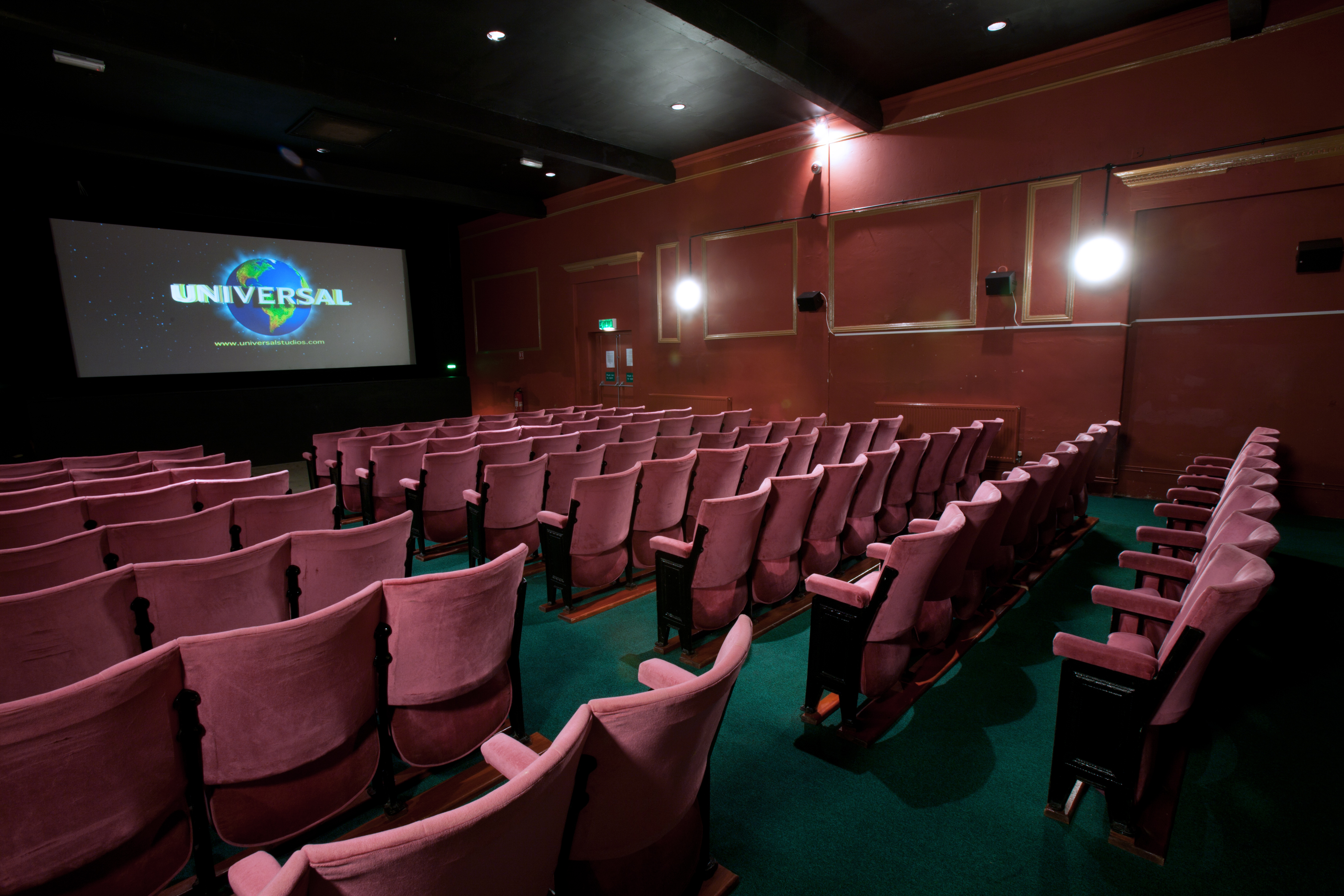
The auditorium before the 2014 refurbishment

In the 2000s the cinema got into debt. In July 2009 Saied Marham sold it to Philippa Farrow and Jane Derricott, who installed a small refreshment bar in the northwest corner of the auditorium.

In 2011 Farrow and Derricott sold the cinema to Becky Hallsmith. In 2014, as a result of a successful Kickstarter Campaign, Hallsmith had the auditorium refurbished with new seats.

Becky Hallsmith died in September 2018. In April 2022 the 'Own the UPP' campaign offered 312,000 community shares to Oxford residents, in July 2022 the campaign had sold sufficient shares to run the cinema as a community asset.

== See also ==
- Phoenix Picturehouse, Walton Street
