= Bill Heine =

American-born British radio broadcaster and writer (1945–2019)

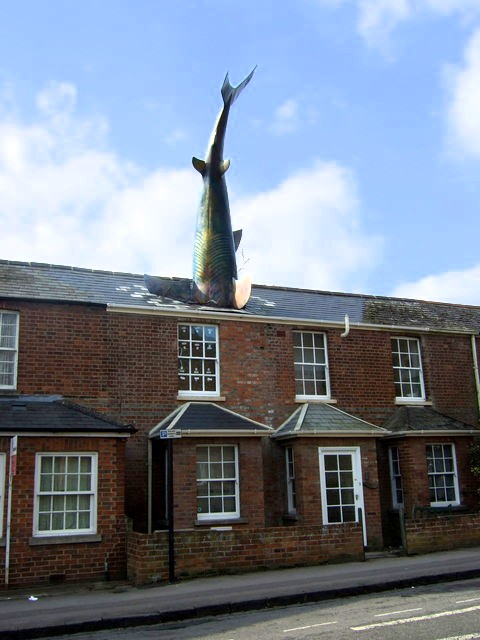
Heine's house with The Headington Shark in Headington, Oxford, England

William Randolph Heine (9 January 1945 – 2 April 2019) was an American-born British radio broadcaster and writer based in Oxford, England.

Heine started working for BBC Radio Oxford in 1983, and was considered by many to be very opinionated and perhaps somewhat controversial in the field of radio presenting. He was described as unafraid to speak his mind, allowing his listeners to do the same during his former afternoon phone-in show. Heine's last regular broadcast was on 24 April 2016.

Born in Batavia, Illinois, Heine lived in Oxford since studying for a postgraduate degree at Balliol College in the late 1960s. In the 1970s and 1980s, he ran both the Penultimate Picture Palace cinema in East Oxford and the Moulin Rouge Cinema (which he later renamed Not The Moulin Rouge) in Headington. Bill and his friend, the sculptor John Buckley, designed a giant pair of hands to adorn the former, and a giant pair of legs for the latter.

Together Heine and Buckley, again, in 1986 came up with the 25-foot (7.6 m) fibreglass sculpture of a shark that appears to be crashing through the roof of the house he lived within, in the Headington area of Oxford, creating a somewhat controversial local landmark.

Heine's book about his radio career, Heinstein of the Airwaves, was published by Chris Andrews Publications on 31 October 2008, and his book about his infamous sculpture, The Hunting of the Shark, was published by Oxfordfolio on 9 August 2011.

In November 2017, Heine revealed that he had been diagnosed with terminal acute myeloid leukaemia. He died at home on 2 April 2019.
