= Phoenix Picturehouse =

Cinema in Oxford, England

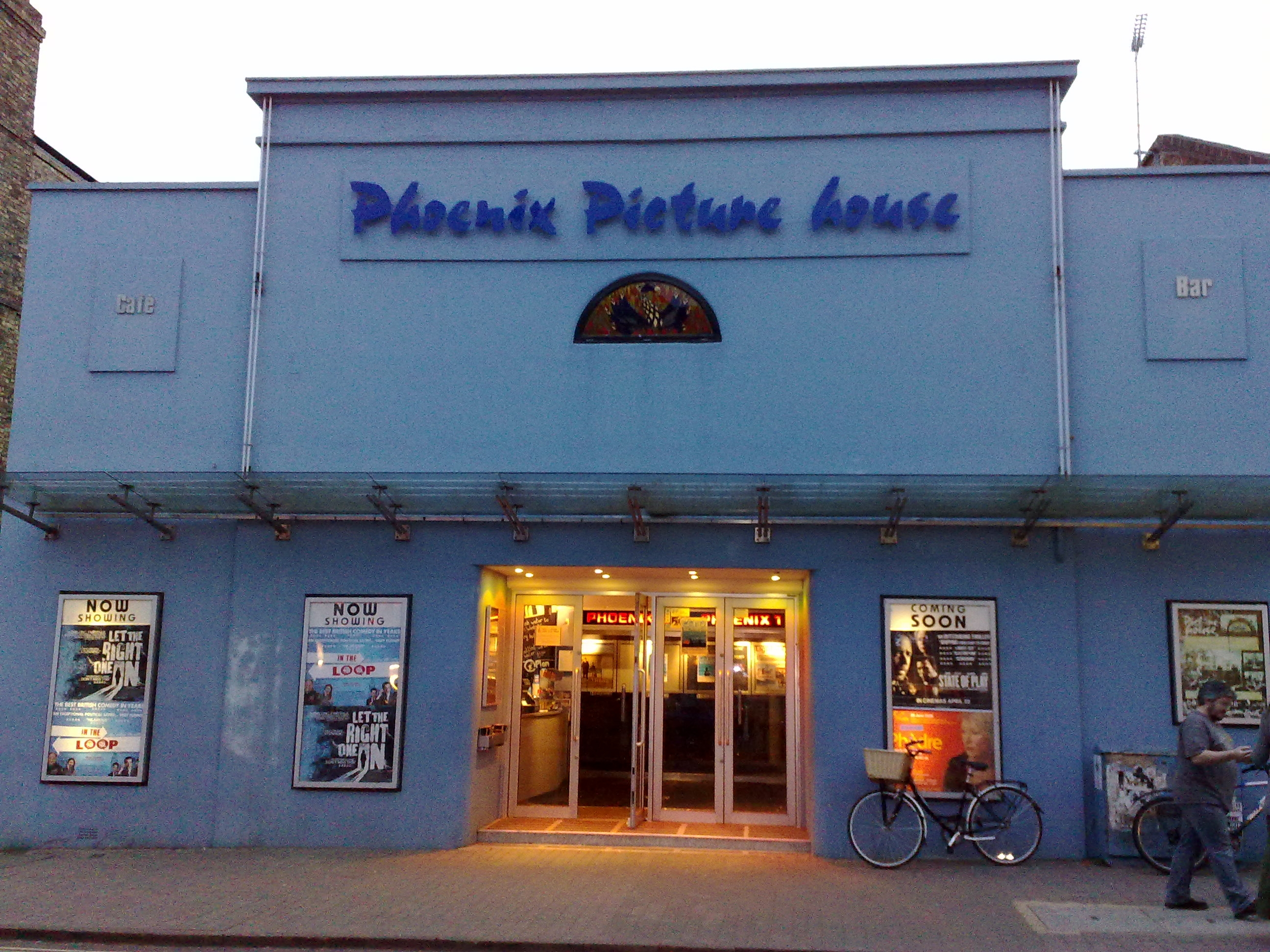
- Façade of the Phoenix Picturehouse
- Interactive map of Phoenix Picturehouse
- Former names: North Oxford Cinema (1913–20); The Scala (1920–25, 1925–70); New Scala (1925); Studios One and Two (1970–76); Studio One and Studio X (1976–77)
- Address: 57 Walton Street, Oxford; OX2 6AE
- Location: Jericho, Oxford
- Coordinates: 51.760322°N 1.266636°W
- Owner: Cineworld
- Operator: Picturehouse Cinemas
- Type: cinema
- Events: mainstream films, independent films
- Public transit: No buses serve Walton Street. Oxford Bus 6 and Stagecoach buses S2, S3 serve Woodstock Road, 1/3 mile (540 m) away

Construction
- Built: 1913
- Opened: 15 March 1913; 113 years ago
- Renovated: 2017
- Architects: Gilbert T Gardner, new façade 1939 by Frederick Chancellor

Website
- www.picturehouses.co.uk/cinema/Phoenix_Picturehouse/

The Phoenix Picturehouse is a cinema in Oxford, England. It is at 57 Walton Street in the Jericho district of Oxford.

The Phoenix used to be an independent cinema, and from 1989 the Picturehouse Cinemas chain developed from it. Since 2012 the multi-national Cineworld group has owned Picturehouse Cinemas.

== History ==
The building was designed by local architect Gilbert T Gardner for proprietors Richard Henry John Bartlett, W Beeson and Charles Green. It opened on 15 March 1913 as the North Oxford Kinema. By then Oxford had several cinemas, including the Electric Theatre in Castle Street and the Oxford Picture Palace in Jeune Street.

The cinema changed hands several times in its early years. Proprietors included Hubert Thomas Lambert (1917–20), CW Poole's Entertainments (1920–23), Walshaw Enterprises (1923–25), Ben Jay (1925–27), J Bailiff (1927–28), and Edward Alfred Roberts (1928–30).

In 1920 Poole's, a company most famous for Poole's Myriorama, refurbished the cinema and renamed it The Scala. In 1925 Ben Jay briefly renamed it the New Scala.

In 1930 the lease was acquired by John Edward Poyntz (Born in Ammanford, Carmarthenshire, Wales in Oct 1886), who had sound equipment installed. In 1939 the original façade was replaced with one designed by Frederick GM Chancellor of Frank Matcham & Co.

Poyntz regularly showed subtitled films, which were especially popular with foreign-language students. The Poytz family owned the cinema for 40 years, and made it one of the UK's most important art film cinemas outside London.

In 1970 Star Associated Holdings Ltd bought the cinema, divided its single auditorium into two, and renamed it Studios One and Two. The film selection became much more mainstream, and adult films became a regular part of the programme. In 1976 Studio Two was renamed Studio X and briefly became a private club for more explicit adult films.

In 1977 the cinema was renamed The Phoenix by new owners Charles and Kitty Cooper of Contemporary Films, who returned the repertoire to art house and foreign language films. Contemporary Films introduced late-night screenings every day of the week, which were very popular with local students. Custom declined in the 1980s, as it did throughout the UK at this time. The Coopers reluctantly sold the cinema.

In 1987 the cinema was used as a filming location in The Silent World of Nicholas Quinn, an episode of ITV's Inspector Morse.

In 1989 Lyn Goleby and Tony Jones bought the cinema and made it the first venue in the Picturehouse Cinemas group, which as of 2018 had 24 cinemas. On 6 December 2012 Cineworld bought Picturehouse Cinemas. Although no longer independent, the Phoenix Picturehouse still maintains the appearance of an independent cinema. In March 2013 the cinema celebrated its centenary. Later that year Picturehouses published a book of its history.

In August 2017 the cinema closed for a major two-month refurbishment of both of its cinema screens, reopening in October 2017.

== See also ==
- The Ultimate Picture Palace, Jeune Street

== Bibliography ==
- Allison, Deborah; Chan, Hiu M; Gennari, Daniela Treveri (2013). The Phoenix Picturehouse: 100 Years of Oxford Cinema Memories. Picturehouse Publications. ISBN 978-0992646103.
- Chan, Hiu M (October 2015). 100 Years at The Phoenix: Archive of an Oxford Cinema 1913–2013 (PDF). Oxford Folio. ISBN 978-0956740557.
