= Frederic John Walker =

Royal Navy officer (1896–1944)

Frederic John Walker CB, DSO & Three Bars
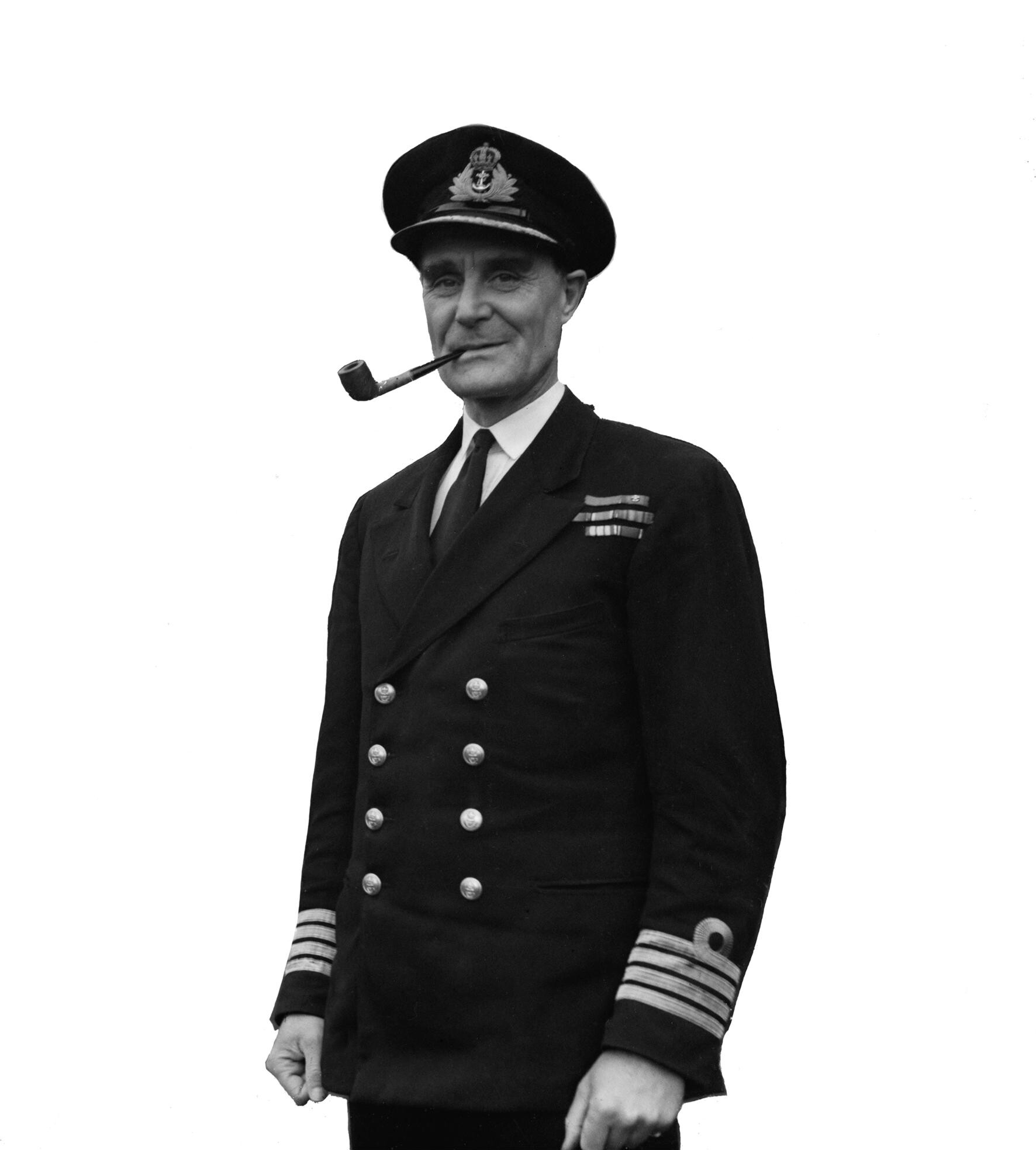
- Captain Frederic Walker c.1944
- Born: 3 June 1896; Plymouth, England
- Died: 9 July 1944 (aged 48); Seaforth, Merseyside, England
- Military career
- Allegiance: United Kingdom
- Branch: Royal Navy
- Service years: 1909–1944
- Rank: Captain
- Nickname: "Johnnie"
- Commands: HMS Shikari (1933); HMS Falmouth (1933–1935); HMS Stork (1941–1942); 36th Escort Group (1941–1942); HMS Starling (1943–1944); 2nd Support Group (1943–1944)
- Conflicts: First World War; Second World War: Operation Dynamo; Battle of the Atlantic
- Awards: Companion of the Order of the Bath; Companion of the Distinguished Service Order & Three Bars; Mentioned in Despatches (3)

Captain Frederic John Walker (3 June 1896 – 9 July 1944) (Note: his first name is given as Frederick in the Oxford Dictionary of National Biography and some London Gazette entries) was a British Royal Navy officer noted for his service during the Second World War. Known popularly as "Johnnie Walker" (after the Johnnie Walker brand of whisky), he was the most successful anti-submarine warfare commander during the Battle of the Atlantic.

== Early life and career ==
Walker was born in Plymouth, the son of Frederic Murray and Lucy Selina (née Scriven) Walker. He joined the Royal Navy as a cadet in 1909 and was educated at the Royal Naval Colleges at Osborne and Dartmouth, where he excelled. First serving on the battleship Ajax as a midshipman, Walker as a sub-lieutenant went on to join the destroyers Mermaid and Sarpedon in 1916 and 1917 respectively. Following the end of the First World War, Walker joined the Queen Elizabeth-class battleship Valiant. He married Jessica Eileen Ryder Stobart, with whom he had three sons and a daughter.

== Interwar period, 1920s–1930s ==
During the interwar period Walker entered the field of anti-submarine warfare. He took a course at the newly founded anti-submarine warfare training school of HMS Osprey, on the Isle of Portland, which was established in 1924. Walker consequently became an expert in this particular type of warfare, and was appointed to a post specialising in this field, serving in a number of capital ships. In May 1933 he was promoted to commander and took charge of the First World War destroyer Shikari. In December 1933 Walker took command of the Shoreham-class sloop Falmouth based on the China Station. In April 1937 Walker became the Experimental Commander at HMS Osprey.

== Second World War ==
In 1940, he was appointed as Operations Staff Officer to Vice-Admiral Sir Bertram Ramsay. Even so, Walker still had not been given a command, despite his expertise in antisubmarine warfare that would no doubt be indispensable in the Battle of the Atlantic. During Walker's time in that role, the Operation Dynamo evacuation took place from Dunkirk, in which the British Expeditionary Force (BEF) was evacuated from France. The evacuation was a success, with over 338,000 British and French troops being rescued and brought back to England, or to Brittany. He was Mentioned in Despatches for his work during this operation.

=== 36th Escort group ===
Walker received his own command in October 1941, taking control of the 36th Escort Group, commanding from the Bittern-class sloop Stork. The escort group which consisted of two sloops (HMS Stork and Deptford) and six corvettes was based in Gladstone Dock, Bootle near the home of the Western Approaches Command. Initially his Group was primarily used to escort convoys to and from Gibraltar.

Walker's first chance to test his methods against the U-boat menace came in December 1941, when his group escorted Convoy HG 76 (32 ships). During the journey five U-boats were sunk, four by Walker's group, including U-574 which was depth-charged and rammed by Walker's own ship on 19 December 1941. The Royal Navy's loss during the Battle for HG 76 was one escort carrier, Audacity, formerly the German vessel Hannover; one destroyer, Stanley, and two merchant ships. This is sometimes described as the first true Allied convoy victory in the Battle of the Atlantic. He was appointed a Companion of the Distinguished Service Order (DSO) on 6 January 1942, "For daring, skill and determination while escorting to this country a valuable Convoy in the face of relentless attacks from the Enemy, during which three of their Submarines were sunk and two aircraft destroyed by our forces". Walker's group succeeded in sinking at least three more U-boats during his tenure as commander of the 36th Escort Group. In June 1942, Walker was promoted to captain dating from 30 June 1942 and he was awarded the first Bar to his DSO in July 1942.

=== 2nd Support group ===
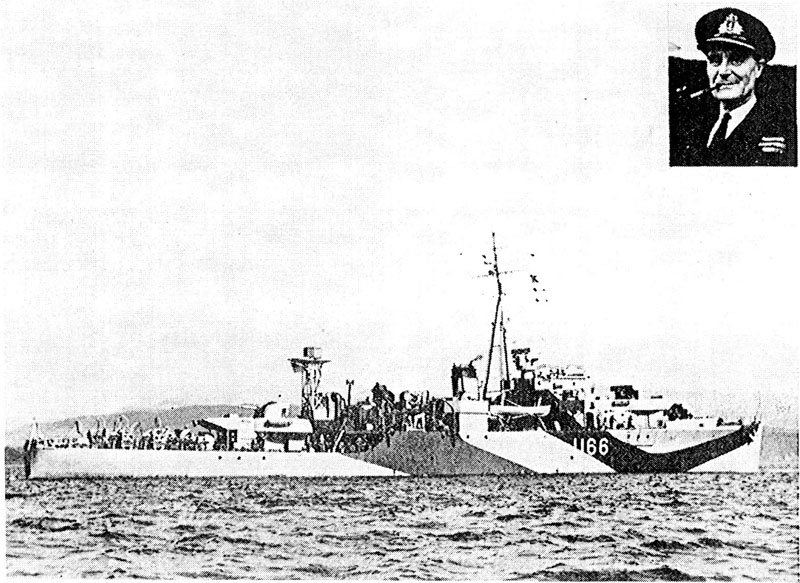
HMS Starling

In October 1942, Walker left the 36th Escort Group and became Captain (D) Liverpool, granting him some time to recuperate. He finally returned to a ship command when he became commander of the 2nd Support Group in 1943, consisting of six sloops, which was based at Gladstone Dock, Bootle. Walker led from Starling, a newly commissioned Black Swan-class sloop. The group was intended to act as a reinforcement to convoys under attack, with the capacity to actively hunt and destroy U-boats, rather than be restricted to escorting convoys. Walker had suggested the idea to the Commander-in-Chief Western Approaches Command, Sir Max Horton. The combination of an active hunting group and a determined, innovative anti-submarine specialist such as Walker proved to be a potent force. One eccentric aspect of his charismatic nature was the playing of the tune A Hunting We Will Go over the ship's Tannoy when returning to its base.

In June 1943, Walker's own ship Starling was responsible for the sinking of two U-boats. The first, U-202, was destroyed on 2 June 1943 by depth charges and gunfire, and the second, U-119, on 24 June 1943 by depth charges and ramming. Another U-boat, U-449, was sunk by his group on the same day. On 30 July 1943, Walker's group encountered a group of three U-boats on the surface (two were type XIV replenishment boats known as "Milk Cows") while in the Bay of Biscay. He signalled the "General Chase" to his group and fired at the submarines, causing damage that prevented them from diving. Two of them, U-462, a Type XIV, and U-504, a Type IX/C40, were then sunk by Walker's group, and the second Type XIV, U-461, by an Australian Short Sunderland flying boat.

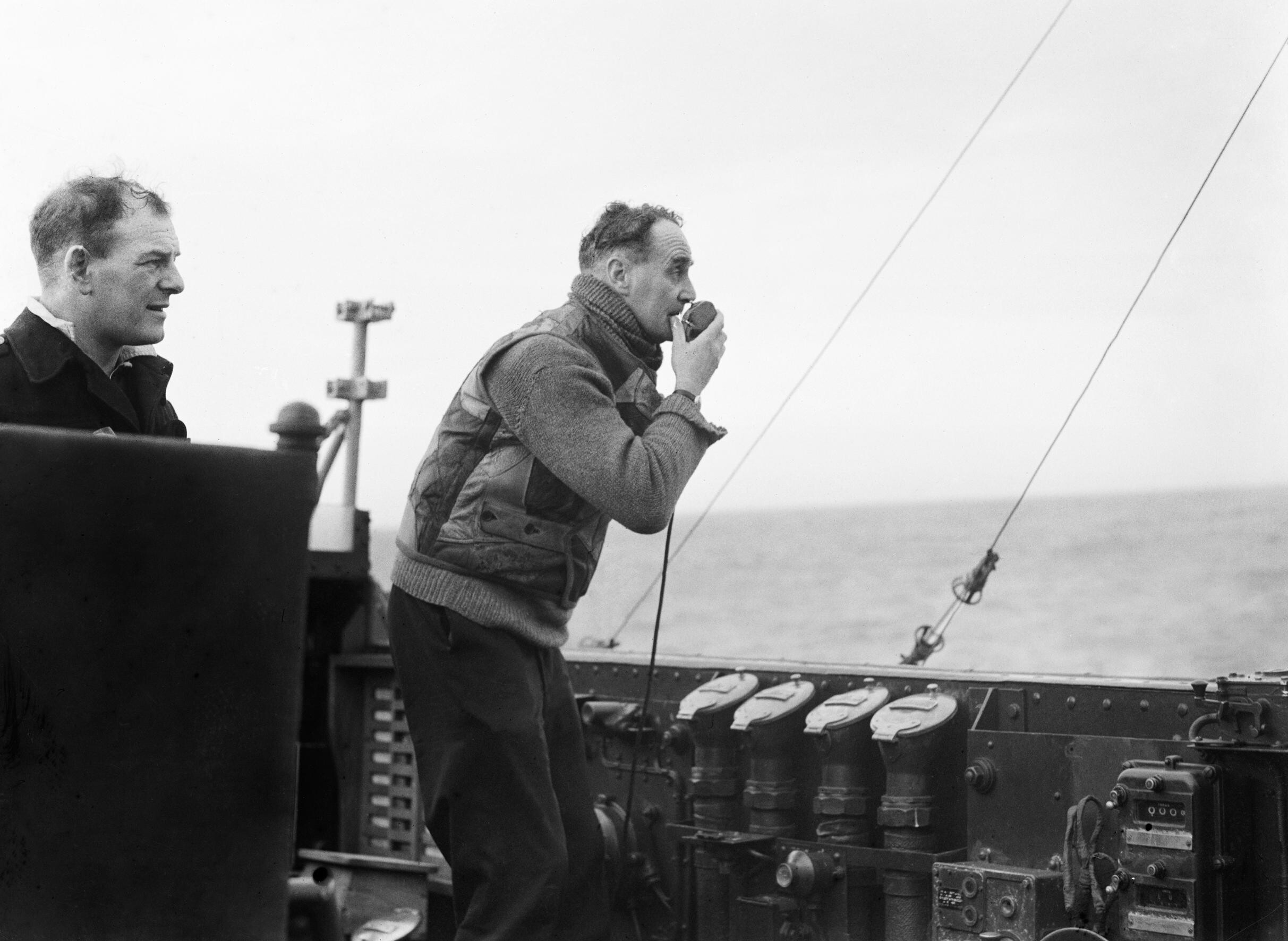
Walker using a loud hailer to encourage one of the ships under his command during an attack on a submarine in early 1944

Upon his return to Gladstone Dock, Walker was informed that his son, Timothy Walker, had been killed when the submarine HMS Parthian was lost in early August 1943 in the Mediterranean Sea. On 14 September 1943, Walker was appointed as a Companion of the Order of the Bath (CB) "for leadership and daring in command of H.M.S. Starling in successful actions against Enemy submarines in the Atlantic."

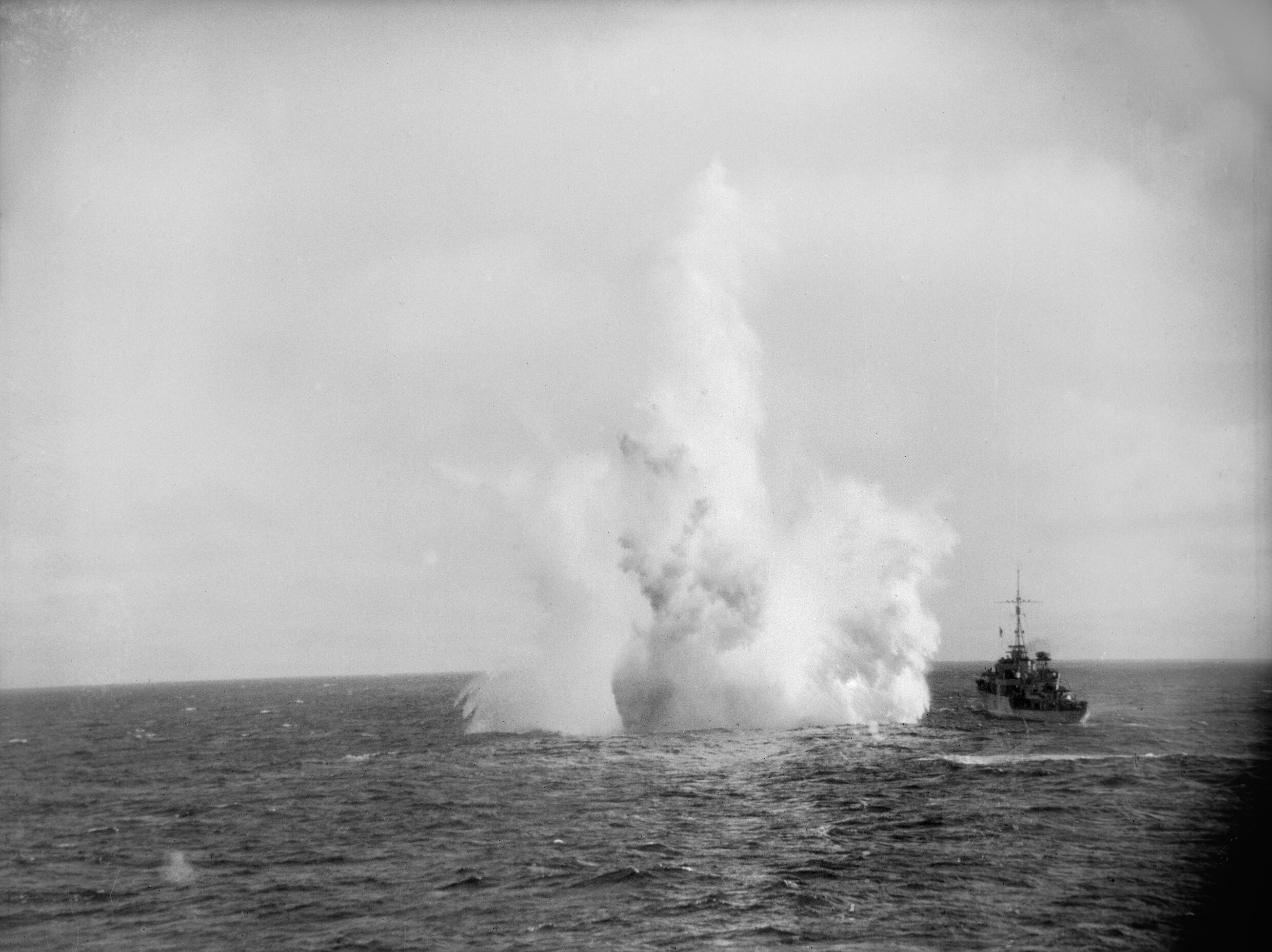
HMS Kite of Escort Group 2 conducting a depth charge attack

On 6 November 1943, Walker's group sank U-226 and U-842. In early 1944 Walker's group displayed its efficiency against U-boats by sinking six in one patrol. On 31 January 1944, Walker's group gained its first kill of the year when it sank U-592. On 9 February his group sank U-762, U-238, and U-734 in one action, then sank U-424 on 11 February, and U-264 on 19 February. On 20 February 1944, one ship of Walker's group, HMS Woodpecker, was torpedoed and sank seven days later while being towed home. All of her crew were saved. They returned to their base at Gladstone Dock to the thrilled jubilation of the local inhabitants and the Admiralty. The First Lord of the Admiralty was present to greet Walker and his ships. Walker's seniority as a captain was backdated from 30 June 1942 to 30 June 1940 and he was awarded a second bar to his DSO.

In March 1944, Walker's group provided part of the 32-ship escort force for an Arctic convoy of 49 merchant ships, codenamed Convoy JW 58. The powerful escort also included two escort carriers and two flotillas of fleet destroyers, as well as the U.S. Navy light cruiser USS Milwaukee which was on its way to Russia as part of the Lend-Lease programme. The whole force was commanded by Rear-Admiral Frederick Dalrymple-Hamilton on the cruiser HMS Diadem, who initially tried to direct Walker's ships into a tight screen, but soon allowed him to independently command the two support groups from Western Command. Walker's own ship Starling sank the U-961 on 29 March, the group's first day with the convoy, and subsequently the ships under his command sank U-360 and U-288 before they arrived at Murmansk without the loss of a single ship. The groups returned with the 36-ship convoy RA 58, but despite intelligence of 16 U-boats in their path, no contacts were made due to adverse conditions affecting the ASDIC (sonar).

Walker's last duty was protecting the fleet from U-boats during the Normandy landings, the immense Allied invasion of France. This he did successfully for two weeks; no U-boats managed to get past Walker and his vessels, and many U-boats were sunk or damaged in the process. During this concerted effort Walker's dedication to his tasks was tremendous; he took no respite from his duties, which ultimately contributed to his death. In May, he was informed by the Commander-in-Chief, Western Approaches, that he was to take a two-month rest starting August and subsequently take command of an aircraft carrier. Later that year, once accustomed to air procedures, he was to be promoted to flag rank and given command of a carrier task force to be taken to the Pacific. He was awarded the third bar to his DSO on 13 June 1944, and was again Mentioned in Despatches on 20 June 1944.

=== Methods ===
One highly successful tactic employed by Walker was the creeping attack, in which two ships would work together to keep contact with a U–boat while attacking. Another approach was the barrage attack, in which three or more sloops in line launched depth charges to saturate the area where the submarine might be. Walker was also adept at the 'hold down': after making contact with a U-boat, keeping it at a depth below depth charge detonation range until it was forced to surface and become susceptible to attack by running out of air or battery power.

=== Successes ===
Walker was the most successful anti-submarine commander of the Second World War, being credited with 20 U boats destroyed, from various ships.

== Death ==
Walker suffered a cerebral thrombosis on 7 July 1944, and he died two days later at the Royal Naval Hospital at Seaforth, Merseyside, at the age of 48. His death was attributed to overwork and exhaustion.

His funeral service, attended by about 1,000 people, took place at Liverpool Cathedral with full naval honours. A naval procession followed, escorting the coffin through the streets of the city to the Pier Head, by the River Mersey, where it was embarked aboard the destroyer Hesperus, for a burial at sea. As Walker's Group had already steamed out for combat duty, most of the naval personnel who manned the funeral procession were from the Royal Canadian Navy.

A final honour was a posthumous Mention in Despatches on 1 August 1944.

== Legacy ==
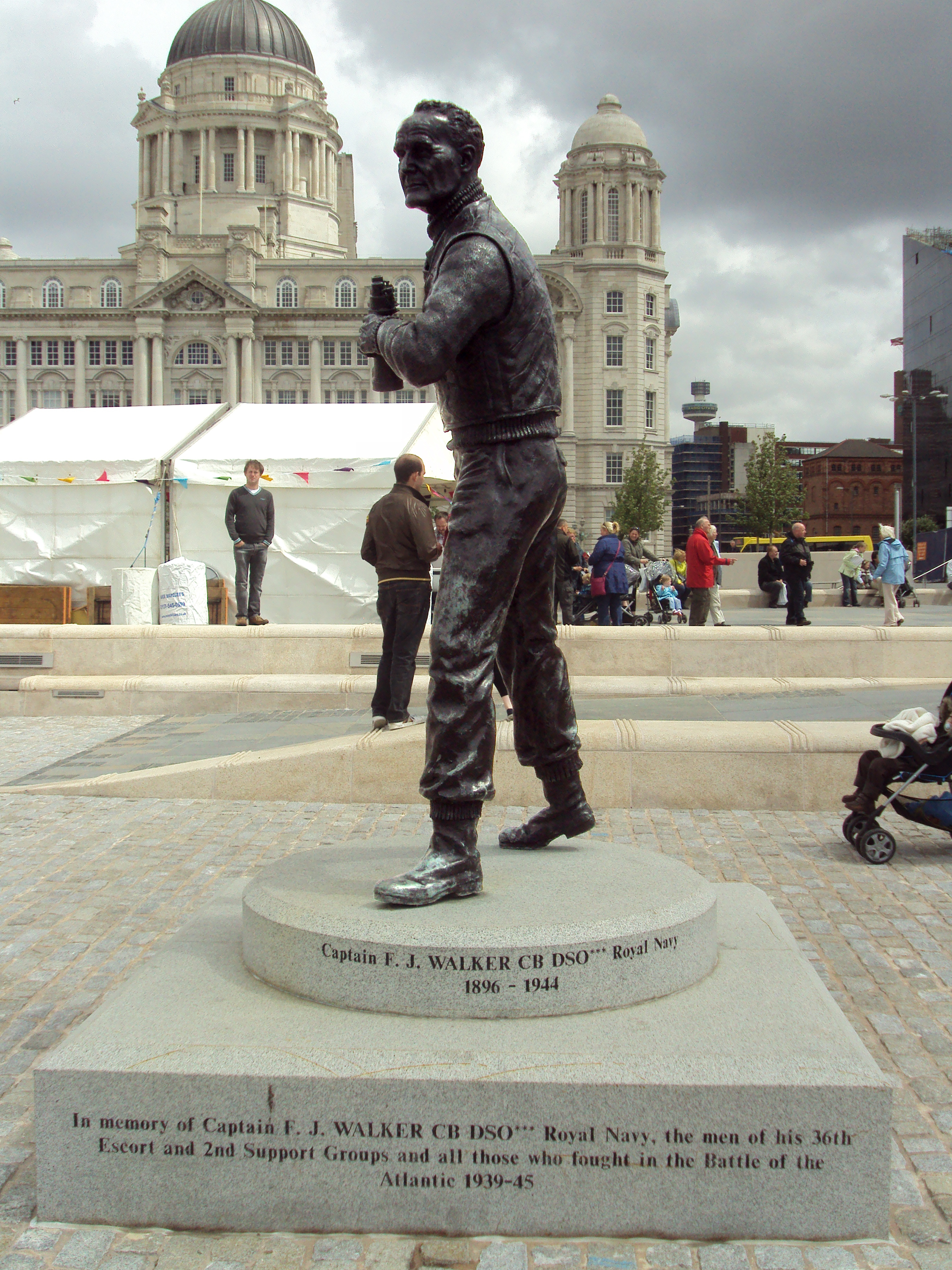
Statue at the Pier Head, Liverpool

In 1998 a statue by Liverpool sculptor Tom Murphy of Walker in a typical pose was unveiled at the Pier Head in Liverpool by the Duke of Edinburgh.

Memorabilia associated with Captain Walker including two paintings of Walker, naval ensigns, the General Chase signal flags and the ships's bell from HMS Starling, which was given to the former Bootle County Borough Council on 21 October 1964 by Admiral Sir Nigel Henderson. Commander-in-Chief, Plymouth, can be viewed in Bootle Town Hall.

== Honours and awards ==
Date	Honour/award	Rank	Description	Notes
16 August 1940	Mentioned in Despatches	Commander	For staff service during Operation Dynamo (the Dunkirk evacuation)	
6 January 1942	Companion of the Distinguished Service Order	Commander	For daring, skill and determination while escorting to this country a valuable Convoy in the face of relentless attacks from the enemy, during which three of their Submarines were sunk and two aircraft destroyed by our forces.	
30 July 1942	Bar to the Distinguished Service Order insignia	Captain	For leadership and skill in action against enemy submarines while serving in H.M. Ships Stork and Vetch. Second DSO awarded as a bar for on the ribbon of the first DSO.	
14 September 1943	Companion of the Order of the Bath	Captain	For leadership and daring in command of H.M.S. Starling in successful actions against enemy submarines in the Atlantic.	
22 February 1944	Second Bar to the Distinguished Service Order insignia	Captain	For gallant and distinguished services in the destruction of two U-boats while serving in H.M. Ships Starling, Kite, Wildgoose and Woodcock, patrolling in the North Atlantic.	
13 June 1944	Third Bar to the Distinguished Service Order insignia	Captain	For outstanding leadership, skill and determination in H.M. ships Starling, Wild Goose, Kite, Woodpecker and Magpie in the destruction of six U-boats in the course of operations covering the passage of convoys in the North Atlantic.	
20 June 1944	Mentioned in Despatches	Captain	For outstanding leadership, skill and devotion to duty in H.M. ships Starling, Wild Goose and Wanderer on convoy escort duty in the North Atlantic.	
1 August 1944	Mentioned in Despatches	Captain	For his actions during the prolonged hunt for and destruction of U-473 in May 1944	
