= Statue of Edward VII, Bootle =

Statue in Merseyside, England

Statue of Edward VII
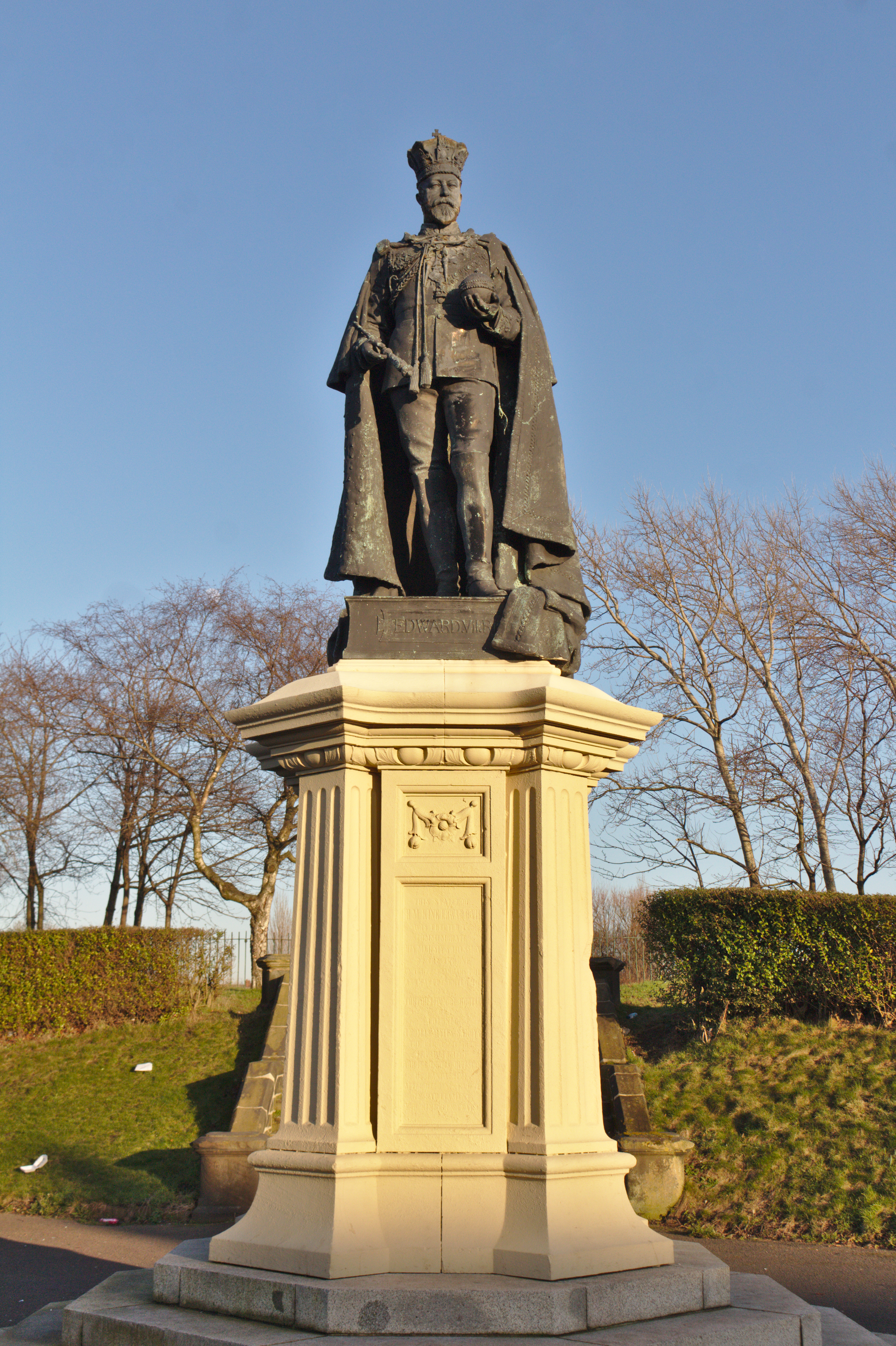
- King's Gardens, Stanley Road, Bootle, showing the position of the statue

- Artist: George Wade
- Year: 1904
- Medium: Bronze
- Subject: Edward VII
- Dimensions: 2.5 m (8.2 ft)
- Designation: Grade II listed building
- Location: King's Gardens; Bootle; 53.44424°N 2.98816°W

The Statue of Edward VII stands in Kings's Gardens, Stanley Road, Bootle, Sefton, Merseyside, England. It was erected to commemorate the Coronation of King Edward VII and consists of a bronze statue of Edward VII on a granite pedestal. The sculptor was George Wade. The statue was given to the borough by the local Member of Parliament, and stands on land given to the borough by Lord Derby. It was unveiled by Lady Derby in 1904.

== History ==
The statue commemorates the Coronation of King Edward VII, which took place on 9 August 1902. Edward VII acceded to the throne following the death of his mother, Queen Victoria on 22 January 1901. In March 1902 the Member of Parliament for Bootle, Colonel Thomas Myles Sandys offered to give a statue of the king to the borough. This would be a copy of statues made for other locations by George Wade, who was a personal friend. (Note: One of the original versions of the statue stands on the Station Approach in Reading, Berkshire. Another was made for Madras (now Chennai). A further version was commissioned for Hong Kong but this has not survived.) The borough council accepted the offer, but a long negotiation took place on its location. It was finally agreed to place it in King's Gardens, on land that had been donated to the council by Lord Derby also to commemorate the coronation. The statue was made in the foundry of J. W. Singer and Company, and the builder was G. Woods and Son of Bootle. The statue was unveiled on 18 July 1904 by Lady Derby on the same day that King's Gardens were opened. In 2010 the statue was damaged by vandals, and was repaired and restored by the National Conservation Centre in Liverpool.

== Description ==
The statue consists of a bronze figure standing on a granite pedestal. The figure is about 2.5 metres (8.2 ft) high and the pedestal is about 2.4 metres (7.9 ft) in height. The figure depicts Edward VII in the uniform of a field marshal, also wearing a cloak and with a crown on his head. In his left hand he is holding the orb, and cradled in his right arm is the sceptre. The pedestal stands on four octagonal steps. It is square with four angular fluted pilasters. On each side are inscribed panels; the inscriptions are weathered and illegible. Above the panels is a cornice with egg and dart moulding.

== Appraisal ==
The memorial is recorded in the National Heritage List for England as a Grade II listed building having been designated on 17 January 1986. Grade II is the lowest of the three grades of listing and is applied to "buildings of national importance and special interest".

== See also ==
- Listed buildings in Bootle

== Notes and references ==
Notes

Citations

Sources

- Morris, Edward; Roberts, Emma (2012), Public Sculpture of Cheshire and Merseyside (excluding Liverpool), Public Sculpture of Britain, vol. 15, Liverpool: Liverpool University Press, ISBN 978-1-84631-492-6
- Historic England, "Statue of Edward VII south of Balliol Road junction, Bootle (1075894)", National Heritage List for England
- Historic England, "The Statue of King Edward, Reading (1113589)", National Heritage List for England
- Historic England, Listed Buildings
- National Recording Project, Statue of Edward VII, archived from the original on 1 February 2014
- The Times of India, British-era statues moved for widening of roads, archived from the original on 2 February 2014
