= Barrage attack (naval tactic) =

The barrage attack was developed during the Battle of the Atlantic in World War II as an anti-submarine measure.

It was first used by 2 Support Group of the Royal Navy after being developed by the Group's commanding officer, Captain "Johnnie" Walker.

The barrage attack was a measure devised by Walker to deal with a U-boat that had gone deep, and was using the time taken by the attacking escort's depth charges to sink to move aside. The design of submarines, to resist the enormous pressure of the water at depth, made them also resistant to the effects of underwater explosions; a depth charge of the Second World War had to explode within about 26 feet of its target to have any serious effect.

The barrage, referred to by the group as "the bosses special", involved three ships moving in line abreast over the target area; at the word of command each ship would lay a series of depth charge patterns, one after the other, in a carpet. The cumulative effect of the explosions, sometimes up to 80 in one attack, would have a devastating effect on their target.

The barrage was expensive in terms of resources and could quickly empty an escort's magazine, so it could only be used in stubborn cases. The practice of equipping convoy ships with reserves of depth charges to re-arm escorts when necessary went some way to alleviate this problem.

The advent of more effective weapons such as Hedgehog, Squid, and the Mk X depth charge also made the barrage less necessary.

== Sources ==
- Burns, Alan: The Fighting Captain (1993) ISBN 0-85052-555-1
- Stephen Roskill : The War at Sea 1939-1945 Vol II (1956) ISBN (none)
