= John Buckley (sculptor) =

English sculptor

John Buckley sitting in his workshop near Wallingford,Oxfordshire.

John Buckley (born 1945 in Leeds, England) is an English sculptor whose best known work is the sculpture Untitled 1986, better known as "the Shark House" or "The Headington Shark" in Headington, a suburb of Oxford.

Buckley went to sculpture classes in the evenings when studying for his O-levels in a technical college. He went on to Winchester School of Art and Leicester College of Art.

In 1976, his friend Bill Heine invited Buckley to design the sculptural fixtures on the Penultimate Picture Palace. For the facade Buckley chose a dramatic figure reminiscent of Al Jolson with outstretched hands. Mae West's lips were the inspiration for the cinema's door handles and, somewhat later Buckley would erect a male and a female figure above the toilet entrances, whimsically named Pearl and Dean.

In 1978, a work of his (Pagliaccio) was exhibited by Nicholas Treadwell at the Washington Art Fair, and he stayed with Treadwell for some time thereafter.

The "Headington Shark" was erected on the 41st anniversary of the dropping of the atomic bomb on Nagasaki. Made of fibreglass on the farm near Wallingford, Oxfordshire where he was based, the shark itself weighs 203 kilograms and is 25 feet long. Buckley regards it as an integral part of Untitled 1986 or "Shark House", a work of "Mixed Media, Brick, slates, wood, metal, polyester resin, glass, plaster, oil paint, lace curtaining and window boxes……."

In the village of Checkendon in South Oxfordshire is his public work The Nuba Survival which features two skeletons embracing each other. The piece was created in 2001 after he visited the Nuba peoples in Sudan. The sculpture is 5 m (16 ft) high. It commemorates around 40 years of civil war in Sudan, on and off from the 1980s to the present day.

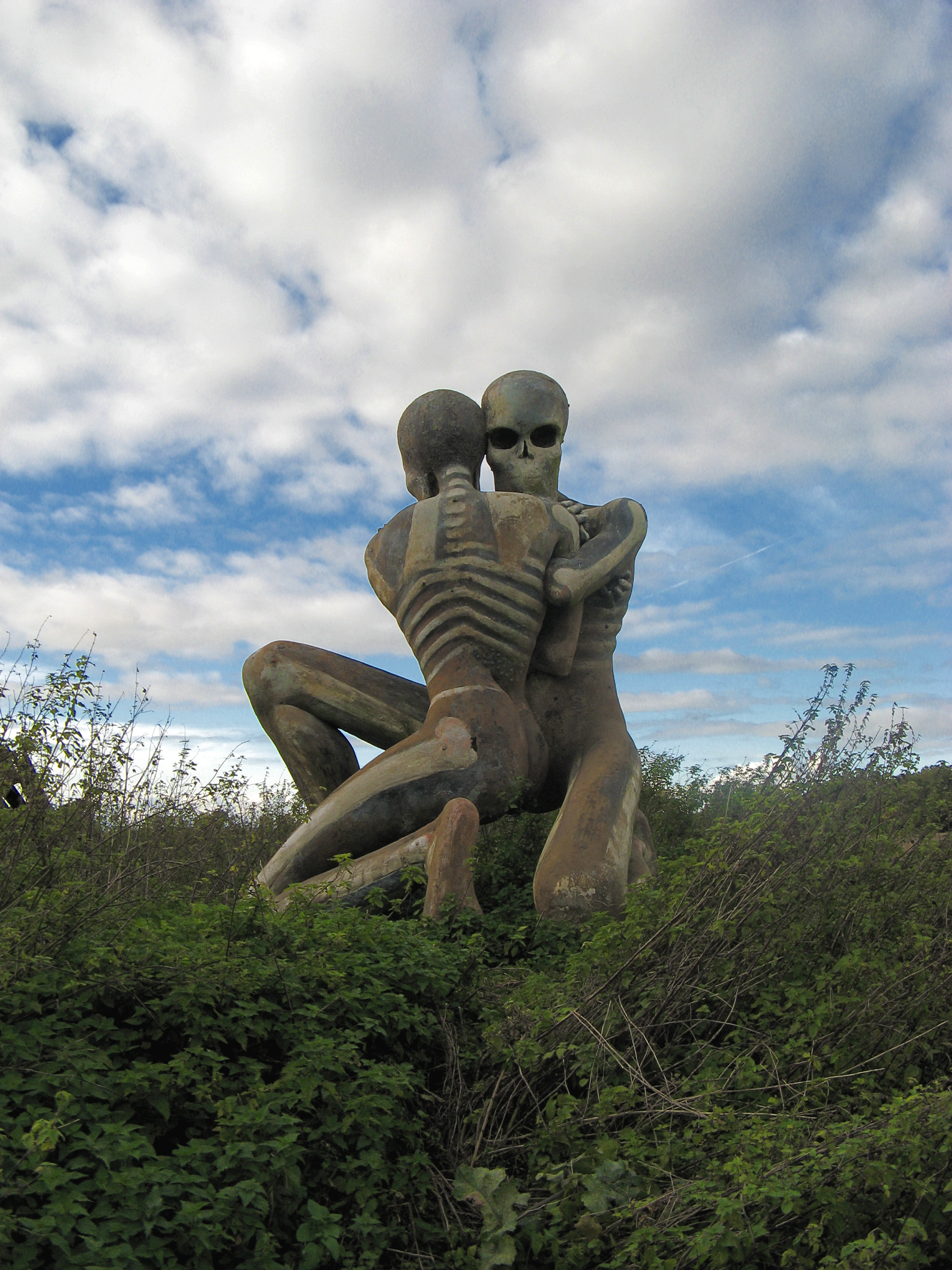
The Nuba Survival, 2001 (coordinates: 51.5385°N 1.0577°W)

John Buckley is a patron of MAG (Mines Advisory Group), a neutral and impartial humanitarian organisation.
