= General Chase =

2(outdated)

W

N

General Chase is a signal in the Royal Navy’s lexicon of fleet orders; releasing ships from a line of battle, or other formation, in order to pursue a retreating or beaten foe. The signal is appropriate to the end of an action, when victory is certain; it allows all ships to break formation and act independently in order to capture or destroy enemy vessels. The signal is achieved by flying signal flags "2","W", and "N"

On occasion the freedom of manoeuvre granted by a General Chase signal has been used to justify a hot chase, where enemy vessels are unlawfully pursued from international waters into the sovereign territory of neutral states.

== Origins ==
The General Chase order was added to the Royal Navy's fighting instructions in the mid-eighteenth century, amending a previous rule requiring that battle could not be joined with any opponent unless a line of battle was formed directly opposite an enemy fleet. The previous order had the advantage of ensuring rigid discipline in the positioning of Navy vessels but allowed an outgunned opponent to break formation and flee without being adequately pursued. The first instance of a General Chase was in the aftermath of the First Battle of Cape Finisterre in 1747, when British ships broke their line of battle to engage and defeat twelve of the fourteen French vessels opposing them. Admiral Edward Hawke also signalled a General Chase in order to overwhelm a French fleet at the Battle of Quiberon Bay, thereby ending France's prospects of invading Britain during the Seven Years' War.

The order has also been issued ahead of battle to express confidence and intimidate an enemy. It was in this context that Admiral Horatio Nelson issued a General Chase order before engaging the French at the Battle of the Nile. In this, more iconic meaning, the General Chase was also signalled by the Royal Navy at the beginning of the Battle of the Falkland Islands on 8 December 1914, and on 30 July 1943 when Captain Fredric Walker signalled "General Chase" before engaging a group of three U-boats in the Bay of Biscay. The "General Chase" signal was hoisted at 1005 and each ship in Walker's group "was then free to make its best speed towards the action ahead." The flags used by Captain Walker at his action are preserved in the Bootle Town Hall, accompanied by an exhibit of the same in the Merseyside Maritime Museum. Note however that the code flags used by Captain Walker were different from those indicated above and in 1944 were Royal Navy Signals BRAVO MIKE ZULU (modern code flag Whisky, red burgee with horizontal yellow stripe centre, modern code flag November). "An excerpt is available here" These can be seen in "this image of the signals kept in Bootle Town Hall"

=== Hot chase ===
The related term "hot chase" signifies a principle within a General Chase order, under which an enemy may be pursued from international waters into those of a neutral power. The "hot chase" has no legal status but is periodically put forward in defence of breaches of sovereignty, by referring to the wide latitude given to ship's captains in a General Chase.

An example of a hot chase arose with the actions of Admiral Edward Boscawen during the Battle of Lagos between French and British fleets in 1759. Near the end of the battle, four French vessels turned to flee and were pursued by Boscawen's forces towards the coast of neutral Portugal. Three of the four were overhauled and captured in Portuguese waters; the fourth ran aground and was burned by her own crew. Portuguese authorities complained to Admiralty at this violation of their sovereignty and neutral status, but accepted Boscawen's defence that it was an unfortunate consequence of the General Chase order.
