= Bootle Town Hall =

Municipal building in Bootle, Merseyside, England

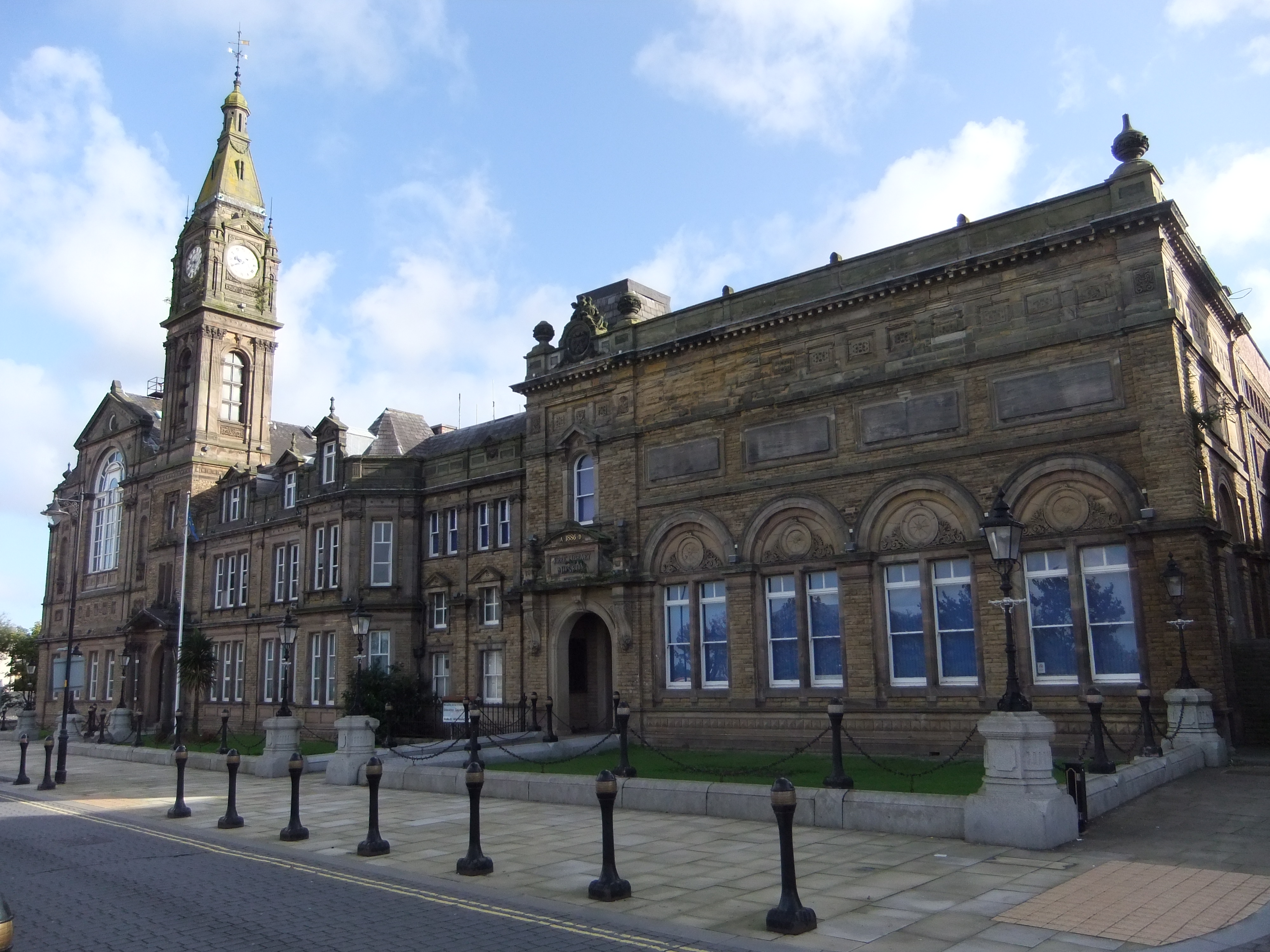
- Bootle Town Hall

- Shown in Merseyside
- 53.4456°N 2.9945°W
- Location: Bootle

History
- Built: 1882

Site notes
- Architect: John Johnson
- Architectural style: Renaissance style

Listed Building – Grade II
- Official name: Town Hall and Front Wall, Oriel Road
- Designated: 17 January 1986
- Reference no.: 1075891

Bootle Town Hall is a municipal building in Oriel Road in Bootle, Merseyside, England. The building, which is the headquarters of Sefton Council, is a Grade II listed building.

== History ==
After significant population growth in the later half of the 19th century, largely associated with Irish immigration attracted by work at the Liverpool docks, and following the incorporation of Bootle-cum-Linacre as a municipal borough in 1868, civic leaders decided to procure a dedicated town hall: the site they selected was open land north of Baliol Road.

The foundation stone for the new building was laid by the mayor, John McArthur, on 8 July 1880. It was designed by John Johnson in the Renaissance style and was officially opened by the mayor, Alderman William Poulson, on 10 April 1882. The design involved an asymmetrical main frontage with eight bays facing onto Oriel Road; the left hand bay featured a large round headed window on the first floor with a pediment above, while the second bay featured a round headed doorway with a tympanum flanked by Corinthian order columns supporting an open pediment with a two-stage clock tower above. The next three bays featured dormer windows at roof level while the last three bays featured mezzanine floor windows. Internally, the principal room was the assembly hall at the north-west corner of the site, which featured stained glass windows depicting the coats of arms of Lancashire towns. The mayor's parlour, council chamber, committee rooms and ante-rooms were all on the west side of the complex, facing Oriel Road, while the offices of the Town Clerk and other corporation officials were on the north side, accessed by a separate entrance on Trinity Road. The building was extended to the south by five bays to include a library and museum in 1887. The town hall became the headquarters of the new county borough of Bootle in 1889.

King George VI and Queen Elizabeth visited the town hall and met with civic leaders in May 1938. Memorabilia associated with Captain Frederic John Walker, who gained a reputation for his successful anti-submarine warfare exploits in the Battle of the Atlantic during the Second World War, includes two paintings, naval ensigns, the General Chase signal flags and the ships's bell from HMS Starling which was given to Bootle Town Hall in October 1964. The colours of the 7th Battalion the King's Regiment (Liverpool), which had been based at Park Street in Bootle and which evolved to become the 40th (The King's) Royal Tank Regiment in 1938, were laid up in the town hall in October 1966.

The building continued to be the local seat of government when the Metropolitan Borough of Sefton was formed in 1974. The main administrative base for new council was established at Bootle Town Hall although the council continued to maintain a presence in Southport by holding some of the meetings of its full council at Southport Town Hall. In March 2020, the town hall, along with the Atkinson Art Gallery and Library and Waterloo Town Hall, was the venue for A Nightingale's Song, a video production produced by Illuminos as part of Sefton's Borough of Culture celebrations, which involved the projection of a story describing local coastal communities onto prominent buildings.

Works of art in the town hall include a painting by Marcel Gillis depicting the fabled Angels of Mons which protected the British Army in the First World War and a painting by Edward Halliday depicting the 40th (The King's) Royal Tank Regiment parading before Queen Elizabeth II at Buckingham Palace in October 1960.

== See also ==
- Listed buildings in Bootle
