= Bootle War Memorial =

War memorial in Bootle, Merseyside, England

Coordinates: 53.44454°N 2.98834°W

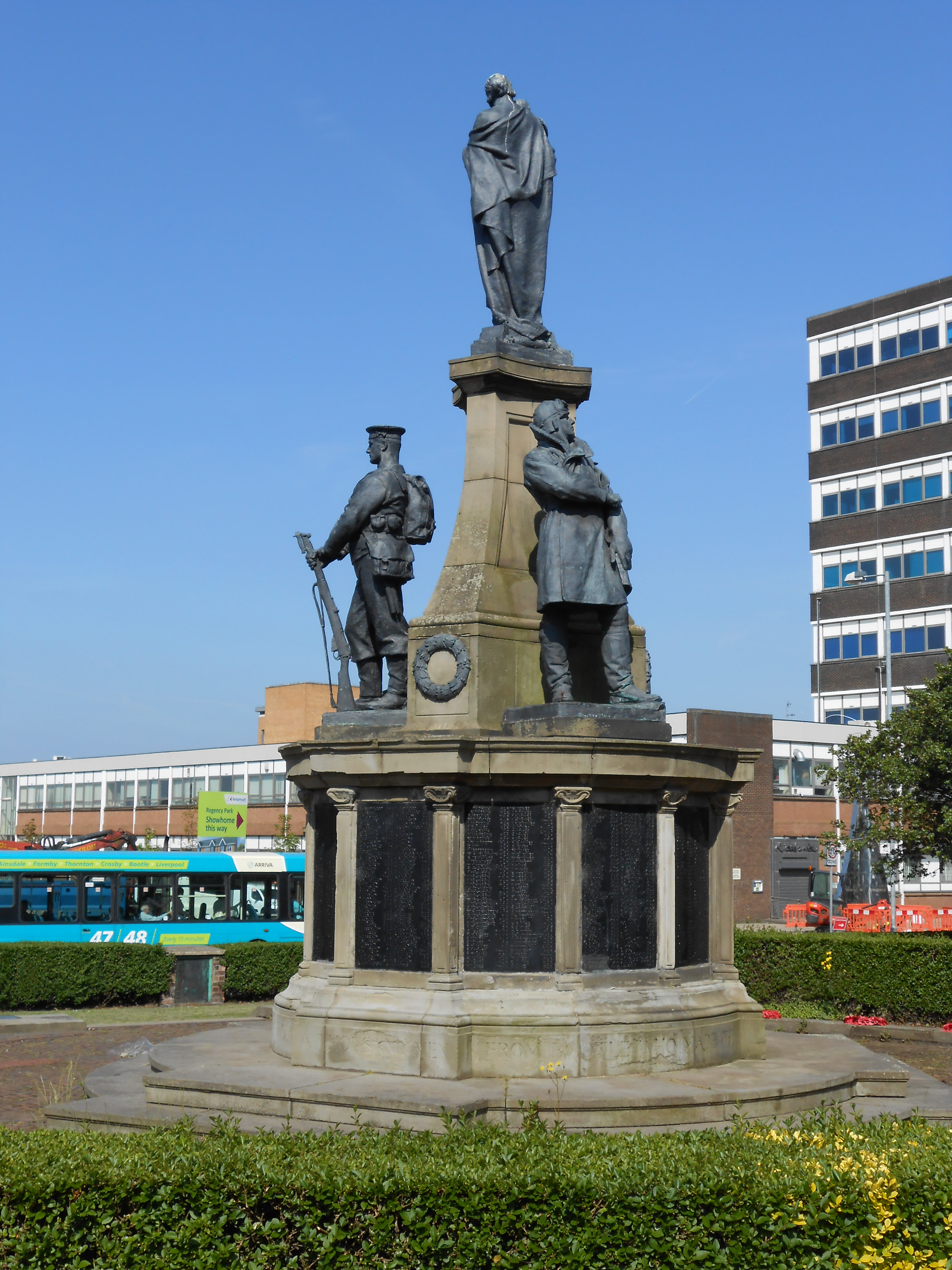
Bootle War memorial

The Bootle War Memorial is in King's Gardens, Stanley Road, Bootle, Sefton, Merseyside, England. It was paid for partly by a grant from the local council, and partly by public subscription. The sculptor was Herman Cawthra, with assistance in the design from Hubert Ernest Bulmer, the borough's art director. The monument consists of a mother and child on top of an obelisk, which is surrounded by the figures of three servicemen. It was unveiled in 1922, and the names of those killed in the Second World War were added in 1948. The memorial was recorded in the National Heritage List for England as a designated Grade II listed building in 1986, and upgraded to Grade II* in 2018.

== History ==
A War Memorial Sub-Committee was established in 1920 to arrange for the design and erection of a memorial for the town. The borough council agreed to make a grant of £2,000 towards the cost, the difference to be made up by public subscriptions. A grant was unusual because at the time the whole cost of war memorials was usually met by public subscription. Herman Cawthra was selected as sculptor. He worked on the design of the memorial with Hubert Ernest Bulmer, a member of the committee and art director for the borough. Some of Cawthra's models were exhibited at the Royal Academy before they were placed on the memorial. The figures were made in the foundry of M. Manenti, and the stonework was built by Henry A. Clegg and Sons of Chester. The memorial was unveiled on 15 October 1922 by Major James Burnie in the presence of a large crowd. In 1948 the names of those killed in the Second World War were added to the memorial- It was re-dedicated on 16 April 1950.

== Description ==
The memorial was built in stone from the Forest of Dean, and the figures are in bronze, cast by the Maneti foundry. The overall height of the memorial is about 7.3 metres (24 ft), and the figures standing on the base are about 2.1 metres (7 ft) high. The base of the monument stands on two circular steps, and has twelve sides divided by pilasters. Between the pilasters are bronze plaques inscribed with the names of the Bootle men who were killed in the World Wars. Standing on the base is a triangular obelisk with concave sides, which carries the figure of a mother holding her child. On the base around the obelisk are three standing figures, a soldier, a sailor, and an airman. (Note: It was unusual at that time for an airman to be included on a war memorial.) Between the figures are three bronze wreathes. On the west side of the memorial is a plaque commemorating the Liverpool Escort Force of the Second World War. An inscription on the monument reads "In grateful memory of over a thousand men from Bootle who made the supreme sacrifice in the Great War, 1914-1918".

== Appraisal ==
The memorial was designated as a Grade II listed building on 17 January 1986. Grade II is the lowest of the three grades of listing and is applied to "buildings of national importance and special interest". It was upgraded to Grade II* on 23 March 2018.

== See also ==
- Grade II* listed war memorials in England
- Listed buildings in Bootle

== Notes and references ==
Notes

Citations

Sources

- Morris, Edward; Roberts, Emma (2012), Public Sculpture of Cheshire and Merseyside (excluding Liverpool), Public Sculpture of Britain, vol. 15, Liverpool: Liverpool University Press, ISBN 978-1-84631-492-6
- Historic England, "War Memorial south of Balliol Road junction, Bootle (1283634)", National Heritage List for England
- Historic England, Listed Buildings
- National Recording Project, War Memorial, archived from the original on 1 February 2014
