= Creeping attack =

The creeping attack was an anti submarine measure developed during the Battle of the Atlantic in World War II.

It was first used by 36 Escort Group of the Royal Navy after being developed by the Group's commanding officer, Captain "Johnnie" Walker.

The problem addressed by Walker in the tactics then in use was that ASDIC, the active sonar means to search for and find a submerged submarine, searched forward, while the main weapon to attack it, the depth charge, was released or projected from the stern. This led to a loss of contact in the final run up to target as the attacking ship passed over it, giving the U-boat a chance to move at the last minute and evade damage. The more skilled or experienced U-boat commanders became adept at predicting the points at which the escort sped up to attack, and when they lost ASDIC contact, and were able to move aside while the charges sank to their depth.

The creeping attack used two ships; one to remain stationary and keep in ASDIC contact, detectable by the target submarine, and guide a second ship onto the target. The second crept up slowly, running as silently as possible and without using ASDIC to avoid detection by the U-boat, and released its depth charges when the first ship, in ASDIC contact, signalled it was positioned correctly. The method required practice to get right, and was expensive of time and resources, but was devastatingly effective. 36 EG, and Walker's next group, 2nd Support Group, were the most successful U-boat killers of the war.

The advent of more sophisticated ASDIC systems that held contact closer in, together with forward-throwing weapons such as Hedgehog and Squid, also overcame the loss of contact that made the creeping attack necessary, but it remained in use throughout the campaign.

== Sources ==
- Burns, Alan: The Fighting Captain (1993) ISBN 0-85052-555-1
- Milner, Marc. The Battle of the Atlantic (2003). ISBN 0-7524-2853-5 (UK): ISBN 1-55068-125-7 (Canada)
