= Joseph Hermon Cawthra =

English sculptor

- Born: 1886; Baildon, Yorkshire, England
- Died: 1971 (aged 84–85); Bradford, West Yorkshire
- Education: Salts Art School; Leeds School of Art; Royal College of Art; Royal Academy Schools
- Known for: Sculpture
- Notable work: War memorials, sculptures

Joseph Hermon Cawthra (1886–1971), was an English monumental sculptor. During his lifetime he was considered among the leading classical sculptors working in Britain and received several commissions for public monuments, war memorials and architectural sculptures.

== Biography ==
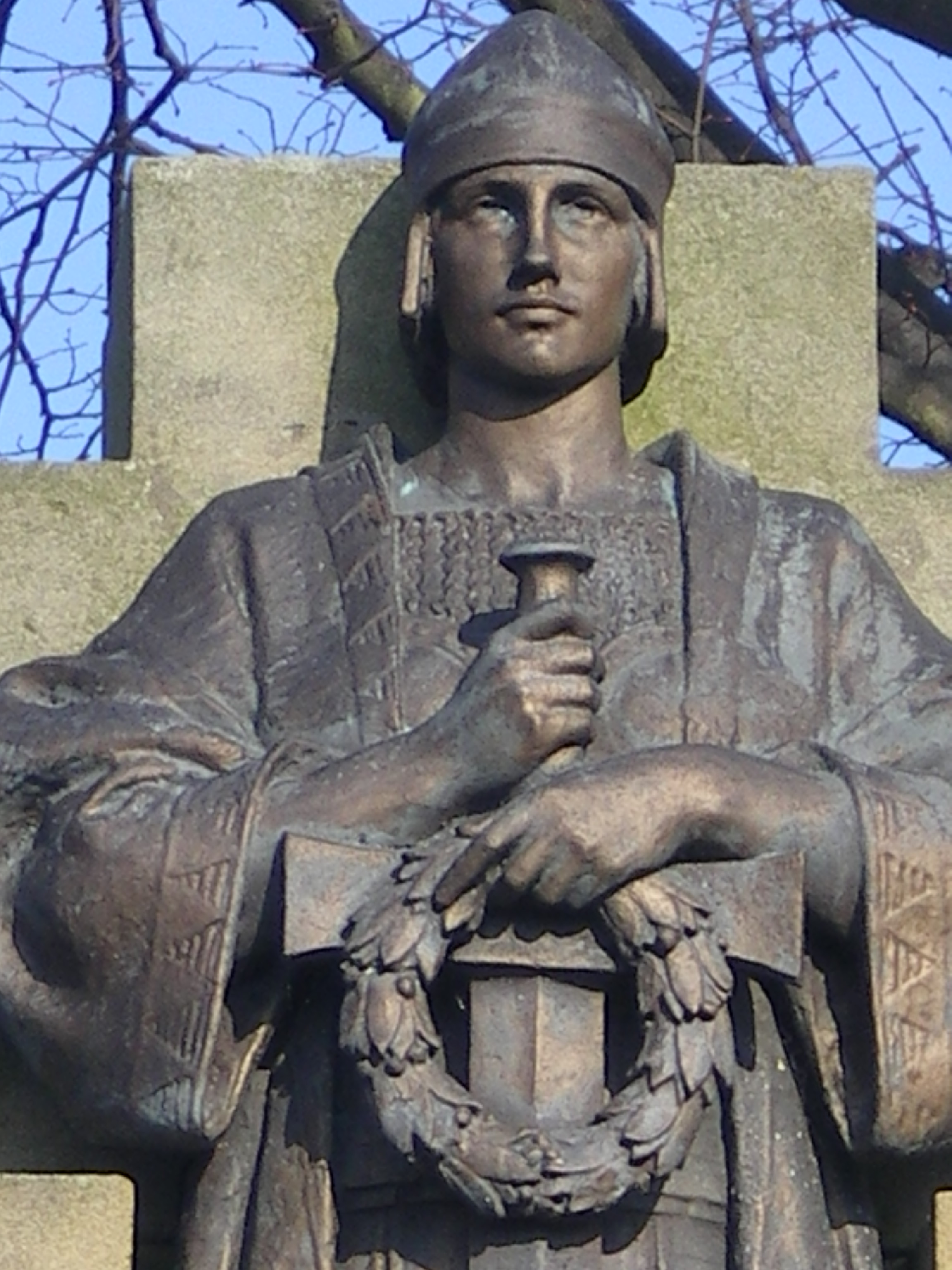
Detail of Gwersyllt War Memorial

Joseph Hermon Cawthra was born in Baildon in Yorkshire, the son of Silas and Ellen Cawthra. From the age of 14 he spent seven years as an apprentice to a monumental stonemason while, from 1904, taking evening classes at the Salts Art School in Shipley until 1907. He then spent two years, from 1907 to 1909, at the Leeds School of Art before moving to London where he studied at the Royal College of Art until 1911 and then the Royal Academy Schools until 1916.

Cawthra was deemed unfit for active service in World War I and spent part of the conflict carving wooden aircraft propellers for the Royal Flying Corps. After the war, he briefly worked for the sculptor Paul Raphael Montford before establishing his own studio in London. Throughout the 1920s and 1930s, Cawthra's studio produced war memorials, architectural sculptures and exhibition pieces. His reputation was established by the sculptures he created for the Bootle War Memorial which, unusually for a World War I memorial featured a sculpture of an airman. A model of the Bootle infantry and airman sculptures were shown at the Royal Academy in 1922. The reliefs Cawthra created for the Bury war memorial were also shown at the Royal Academy and are rare in showing the contribution of women to the war effort. These works led to further war memorial commissions for Cawthra, often featuring a single monumental sculpture on an obelisk.

Cawthra was elected to the Royal British Society of Sculptors (RBS) in 1937. He closed his London studio in 1939 at the start of World War II and took a teaching job at the Brighton College of Art. In 1941 Cawthra took the post of head of sculpture at the Hull College of Art, a position he retained until 1945 when he reopened his London studio. Shortly afterwards Cawthra began to teach part-time at the Bournemouth Municipal College and continued to do so until his retirement at the age of 70.

In the latter part of his life, Cawthra lived at Sheen, near Richmond in south-west London but died during a visit to Cottingley in Yorkshire.

== Selected public works ==
=== 1920s ===
| Image | Title / subject | Location and coordinates | Date | Type | Material | Dimensions | Designation | Wikidata | Notes |
|---|---|---|---|---|---|---|---|---|---|
| More images | | Former Odeon Cinema, Guildford, Surrey | | Four bas-relief panels | Stone | | | | |
| More images | War memorial | Gardens of the Church of St John-at-Hackney, Hackney, London | 1921 | Obelisk-mounted statue | Bronze and Portland stone | 4.6m tall | Grade II | Q26671054 | |
| More images | War memorial | Maule Street, Monifieth, Angus | 1921 | Obelisk-mounted statue | Bronze and stone | | Category B | Q17779629 | Architect, Charles Soutar |
| More images | Bootle War Memorial | King's Gardens, Bootle, Merseyside | 1922 | Four statues on a circular plinth with panels | Bronze and sandstone | | Grade II* | Q15978913 | |
| More images | War memorial | Gwersyllt, Wrexham | 1923 | Obelisk-mounted statue | Bronze and stone | | Grade II | Q29494213 | |
| | Britannia | County Fire Office Building, 218–222 Regent Street, London | 1924 | Sculpture | Stone | | Grade II | | Architect, Ernest Newton |
| More images | War memorial | Bury, Greater Manchester | 1924 | Cross on base with flanking wall and panels | Stone and bronze | | Grade II* | Q66478665 | Panels by Cawthra, cross design by Sir Reginald Blomfield |

=== 1930s ===
| Image | Title / subject | Location and coordinates | Date | Type | Material | Dimensions | Designation | Wikidata | Notes |
|---|---|---|---|---|---|---|---|---|---|
| | Putto with Goat and Putto with Turkey | Leeds Civic Hall | c. 1933 | Two sculpture groups | Stone | | Grade II* | | |
| More images | Memorial to Reginald Brabazon, 12th Earl of Meath | Lancaster Gate, London | 1934 | Sculpture and relief on pillar | Portland stone | | Grade II | Q26516071 | (Note: File WORK 20/197 at The National Archives covers the development of the Earl of Meath Memorial at Lancaster Gate from 1933 to 1934. The file also includes a request to Office of Works by the Committee for a National Memorial to the Earl of Meath for approval to erect the statue. The file shows that the Office of Works sought the advice of the Royal Fine Art Commission on where the statue should be positioned and also contains an "Order of Service" for the unveiling, dedication and presentation of the memorial.) |
| More images | Benevolence and Prudence | 37–39 Corn Street, Bristol | 1935 | Statue / relief carving | Portland stone | | Grade II | | |
| More images | Peace and Plenty | 37–39 Corn Street, Bristol | 1935 | Statue / relief carving | Portland stone | | Grade II | | |
| | Robert Burns | Burns' Mausoleum, Dumfries | 1936 | Relief | Stone | | Category A | | Restoration & replacement of original panels |
| | | Sadler's Wells Theatre, London | 1938 | Two reliefs | | | | | One relief was originally positioned over the theatre entrance, the other over the stage. |
| | Commerce and Cotton | Town Hall Extension, St Peter's Square, Manchester | 1938 | Two relief sculptures | Stone | | Grade II* | | |
| | Figures of a philosopher and a counsellor | Town Hall Extension, St Peter's Square, Manchester | 1938 | Two relief sculptures | Stone | | Grade II* | | |

=== Later works ===
| Image | Title / subject | Location and coordinates | Date | Type | Material | Dimensions | Designation | Wikidata | Notes |
|---|---|---|---|---|---|---|---|---|---|
| | Reginald Brabazon, 12th Earl of Meath | St Paul's Cathedral, London | 1953 | Tablet | Stone | | | | |
| | Tomáš Baťa | Former Bata shoe factory, Princess Margaret Road, East Tilbury, Essex | 1955 | Statue on pedestal | Bronze and stone | | | | |
| | Affection | Bishops Park, Fulham, London | 1963 | Statue | Portland stone | | | | |

=== Other works ===
- In the 1930s for a major renovation of the Bentalls Store in Kingston upon Thames, Cawthra carved several embellishments and a coat of arms. Since then the store has seen further major structural changes and all that now remains of Cawthra's work is the coat of arms.
- In 1937, Selfridges on Oxford Street in London mounted what it called a "sculpted pageant of English History and symbolic Empire groups". Various large bas-reliefs were erected in front of the store. The sculptors given commissions were chosen by William Reid Dick. Cawthra was chosen to sculpt the relief which represented India. The Henry Moore Institute Archive Leeds Cawthra papers reference 1995.9 include cuttings from "The London Illustrated News" covering these bas-reliefs.
- A 1948 war memorial, now lost, in the form of a statuette of Saint George, for the Junior Carlton Club in London.
- Cawthra sculpted the figure of Truth on the top of the dome of the Town Hall building in Braintree, Essex.
- Cawthra's composition Meditation was exhibited at the Royal Academy in 1957 and then stood in Gwendwr Garden, Fulham, London but was subsequently stolen.
- For the Church of St Michael and All Angels in Kingston upon Hull, Cawthra sculpted a Madonna and child.
- A bust of George V for Mombassa.
