= Shoreditch Park =

Open space in Shoreditch, London, England

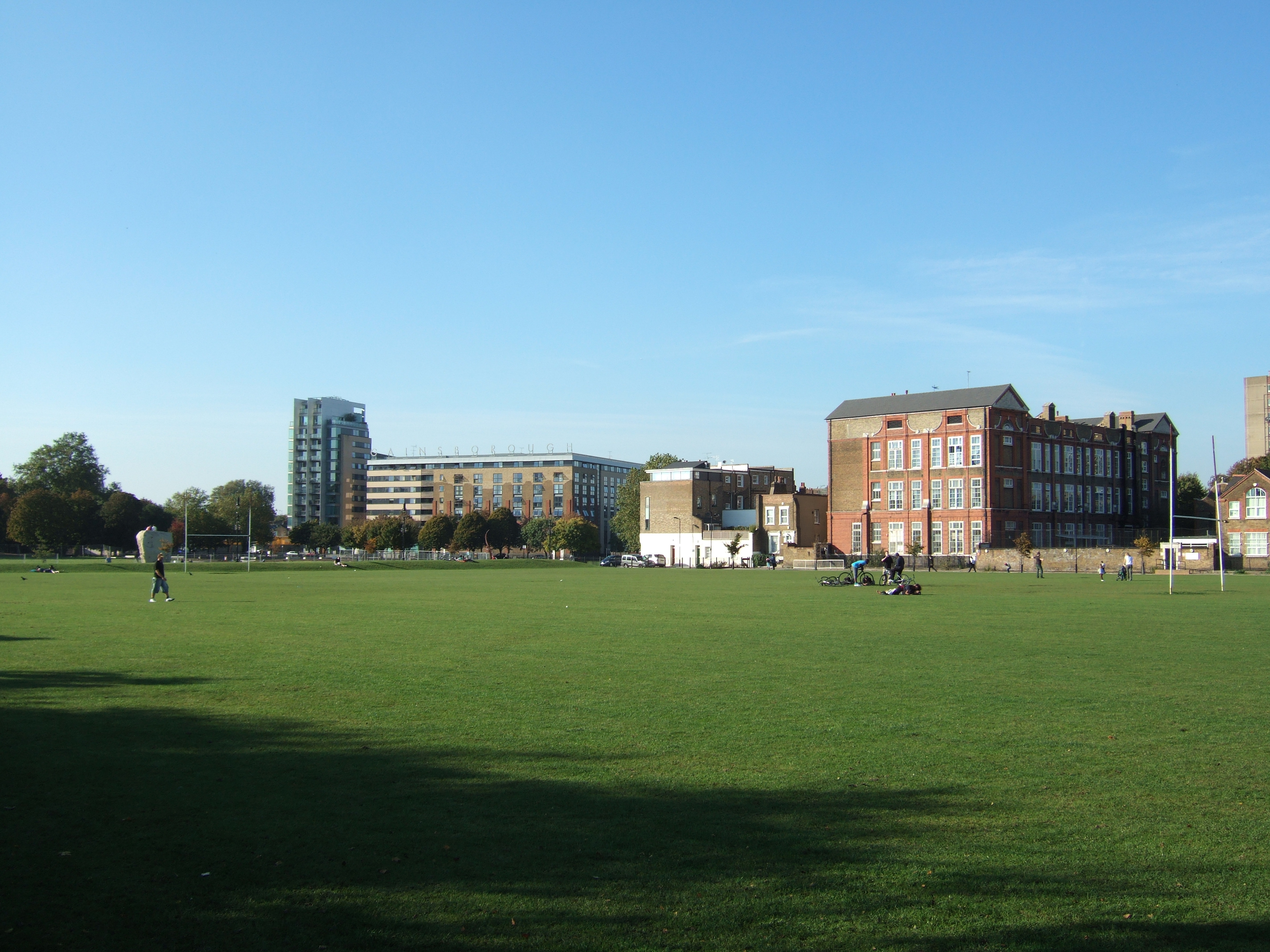
Shoreditch Park in 2008

Shoreditch Park is an open space in Hoxton area of Shoreditch in the London Borough of Hackney. It is bounded by Poole Street (to the north), Rushton and Mintern Streets (to the south) and New North Road (west) and Pitfield Street (east). The park derives its name from the Metropolitan Borough of Shoreditch, the local authority when it was established. The park is 7.7 hectares (19 acres) in extent.

== History ==
The area that now includes much of Shoreditch Park was originally open fields. During the Regency era, and with the building of Regent's Canal, it was developed to create terraced housing for workers and their families. In the early 1940s, much of the area was devastated during the Blitz and later air-raids. In 1945 bomb damaged homes were cleared and prefabs or ‘temporary pre- fabricated housing’ was erected to house the many families made homeless during the War. These homes were designed as a stop gap measure, but many were in place for nearly 20 years before finally being condemned around 1964. The site was then cleared and redeveloped between 1964 and 1973, and several old streets (i.e. Dorchester, Salisbury, Clift, Newton, Rushton, Wareham, and Worgate) were lost when creating the current park.

=== Archaeology ===
In July 2005 and 2006, an extensive excavation was carried out by archaeologists from the Museum of London to commemorate the 60th anniversary of the end of World War II, and documented in a Time Team special episode called "Buried By The Blitz" aired in October 2006. The excavation examined housing of the time, and investigated the damage caused by aerial bombing and missiles. It was pioneering in involving members of the local community in the project.

== Facilities ==
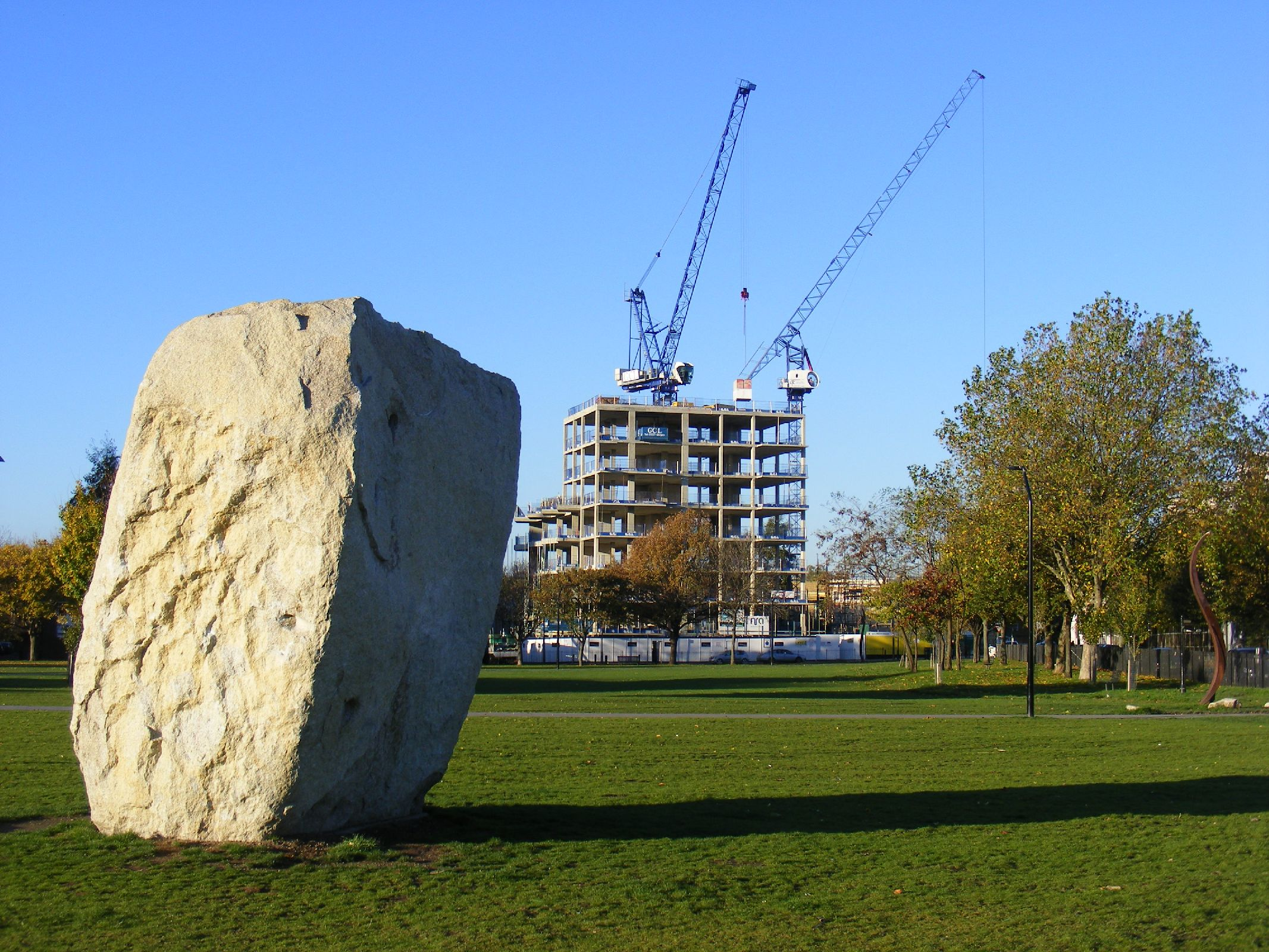
Boulder by John Frankland in 2010

The park has sports facilities, an adventure playground, children's playground, an outdoor beach volleyball court (managed by London Beach Volleyball Club. Recent improvements include innovative low energy LED lighting, the creation of an outdoor amphitheatre in the park for theatre and cinema screenings; and an 85-tonne granite boulder by the artist John Frankland. The Britannia Leisure Centre is adjacent to the park, on its north eastern boundary. Shoreditch Park received a Green Flag award in July 2008.

== Access ==
The nearest London Underground station is Old Street on the Northern line. Buses 21, 76 & 141 stop on New North Road, adjacent to the park.
