= Titus Salt School =

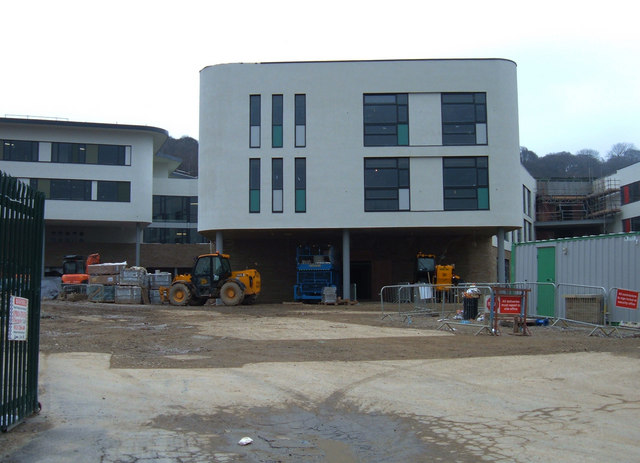
- New school buildings under construction in 2008

Location
- Higher Coach Road; Baildon; Shipley, West Yorkshire, BD17 5RH; England; 53.84219°N 1.79399°W

Information
- Type: Community school
- Motto: Together, resilient, ambitious, caring
- Established: 1876
- Founder: Sir Titus Salt
- Local authority: City of Bradford
- Department for Education URN: 107395 Tables
- Ofsted: Reports
- Head teacher: Phil Temple
- Staff: 140 (approx.)
- Age: 11 to 18
- Enrolment: c. 1,387
- Colour
- Publication: Titus Talks
- Former name: Salt Grammar School
- Former pupils: Old Saltians
- Website: http://www.titussaltschool.co.uk

Titus Salt School is a mixed comprehensive state school, located in Baildon within the City of Bradford, West Yorkshire, England.

== History ==
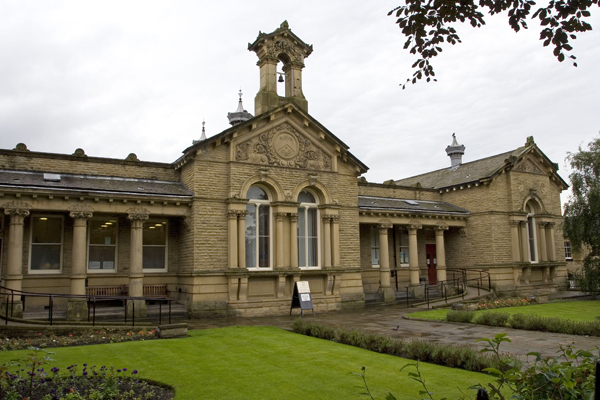
19th century school buildings

Sir Titus Salt opened the Salt High School in Saltaire in 1876. In 1878, it moved from temporary premises at the Saltaire Club and Institute to the Factory School for Salts Mill building across the Victoria Road. It remained on that site into the late 1940s/early 1950s. Until around 1945, the school was segregated into boys' and girls' sections, collectively called Salt's High Schools. In those days, it was a grammar school, whereas today it is a comprehensive school.

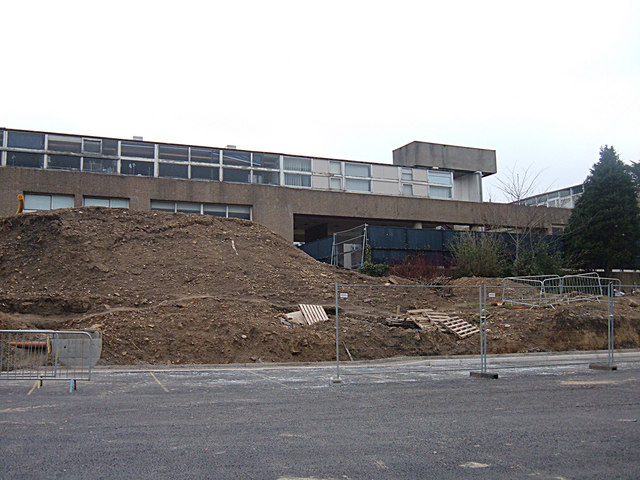
1963 school buildings, demolished after 2008

The current Titus Salt School is housed in a building constructed under the Labour government's Building Schools for the Future scheme. Located in a historically deprived area, Titus Salt School was shortlisted for this scheme and subsequently won permission to build. In September 2008, the school opened to students and the old building (Salt Grammar School) was demolished shortly after.

The Headteacher from 2012 to 2024 was Ian Morrels. Phil Temple took up the role in September 2024.

== Academic standards ==
The Ofsted report of their inspection of 31 January – 4 February 2005 said "Titus Salt School is an effective school in which standards are rising. There is a way to go, but the school has an outstandingly clear sense of purpose and all the right measures are in place for all students to keep on doing well. Leadership and governance are very good. Parents and students are supportive of a school that provides a good quality of education, has a cost-effective sixth form and provides good value for money."

== Years 7–13 ==
Students are taught many subjects including:

Year 7 – Maths, Science, English, a Language (one of either French, Spanish or German), Music, PE, Opening Minds, IT, Food Technology/Textile Technology, Product Design, Geography, History, RE and Art.

Year 8 & 9 – Maths, Science, English, two Languages (two out of French, Spanish and German), Music, PE, Performing Arts, IT, Food Technology/Textile Technology, Product Design, Geography, History, RE (Year 8 only), Ethics (Year 9 only) and Art.

Year 10 and Year 11 students are taught subjects that they have chosen to take as a GCSE or BTEC. Core subjects (subjects that students must be taught) are: English, Maths, Science, PHSCE, Ethics, IT and PE.

Year 12 and 13 (6th Form) students are taught subjects they chose to take as an A Level or BTEC.

== Awards ==
- Sportsmark 2007–08 award.
- International School Award 2007–10
- Investor in People

== Notable former pupils ==
This includes people who attended the school under its various names: Salt Grammar School, Salt Girls' High School, Salt High School, Titus Salt School.

- William Gaskill, theatre director
- Richard Illingworth, cricketer
- David Jefferies, motorcycle racer.
- Jim Laker, cricketer
- Janet Ormondroyd, chief executive since 2008 of Bristol City Council
- Marie Studholme, actress
