= Sharks! =

Public art installation in London, England

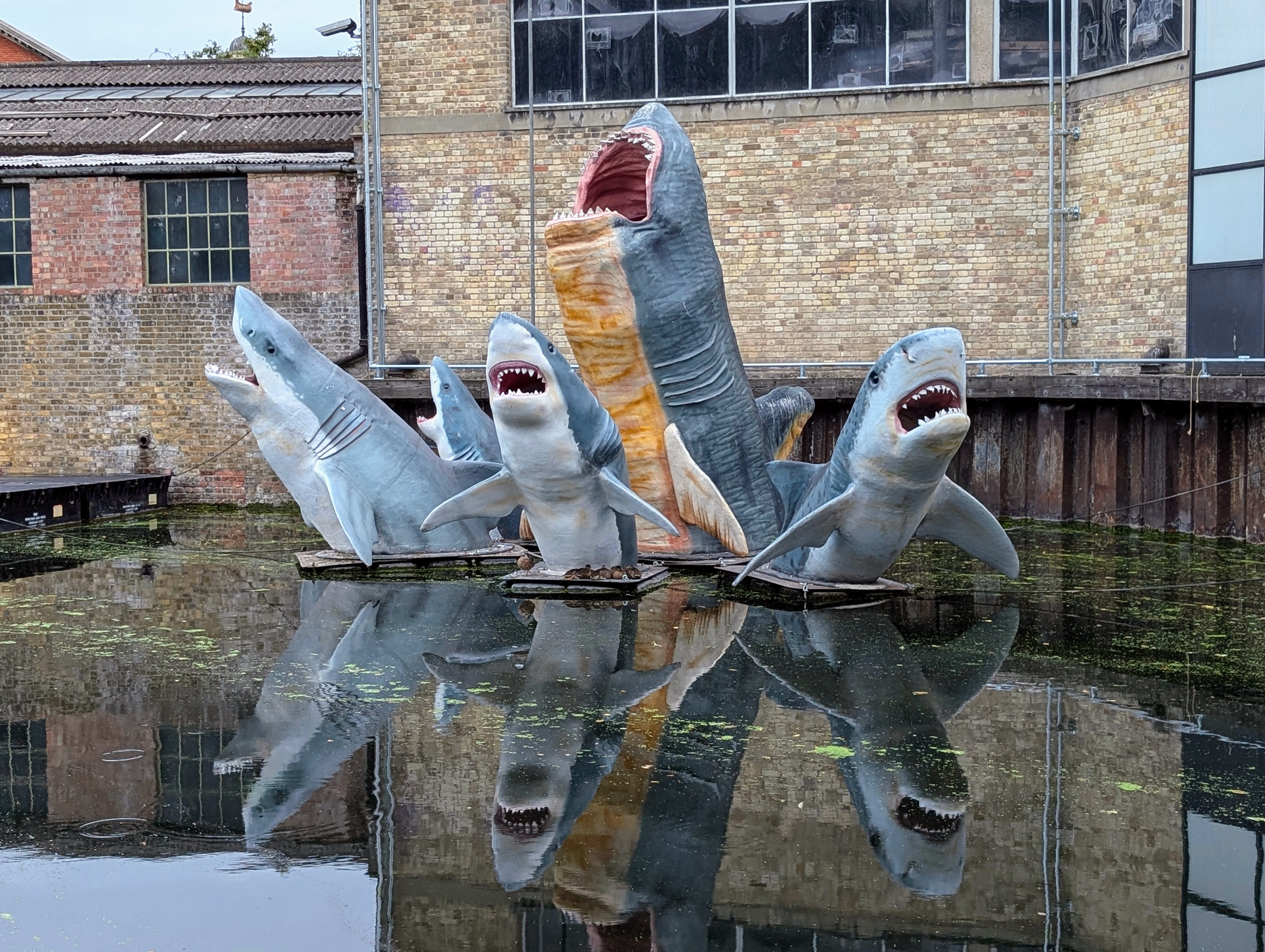
- The art installation in 2026 in Hoxton
- Artist: Jaimie Shorten
- Location: London, England; 51°32′09″N 0°04′18″W

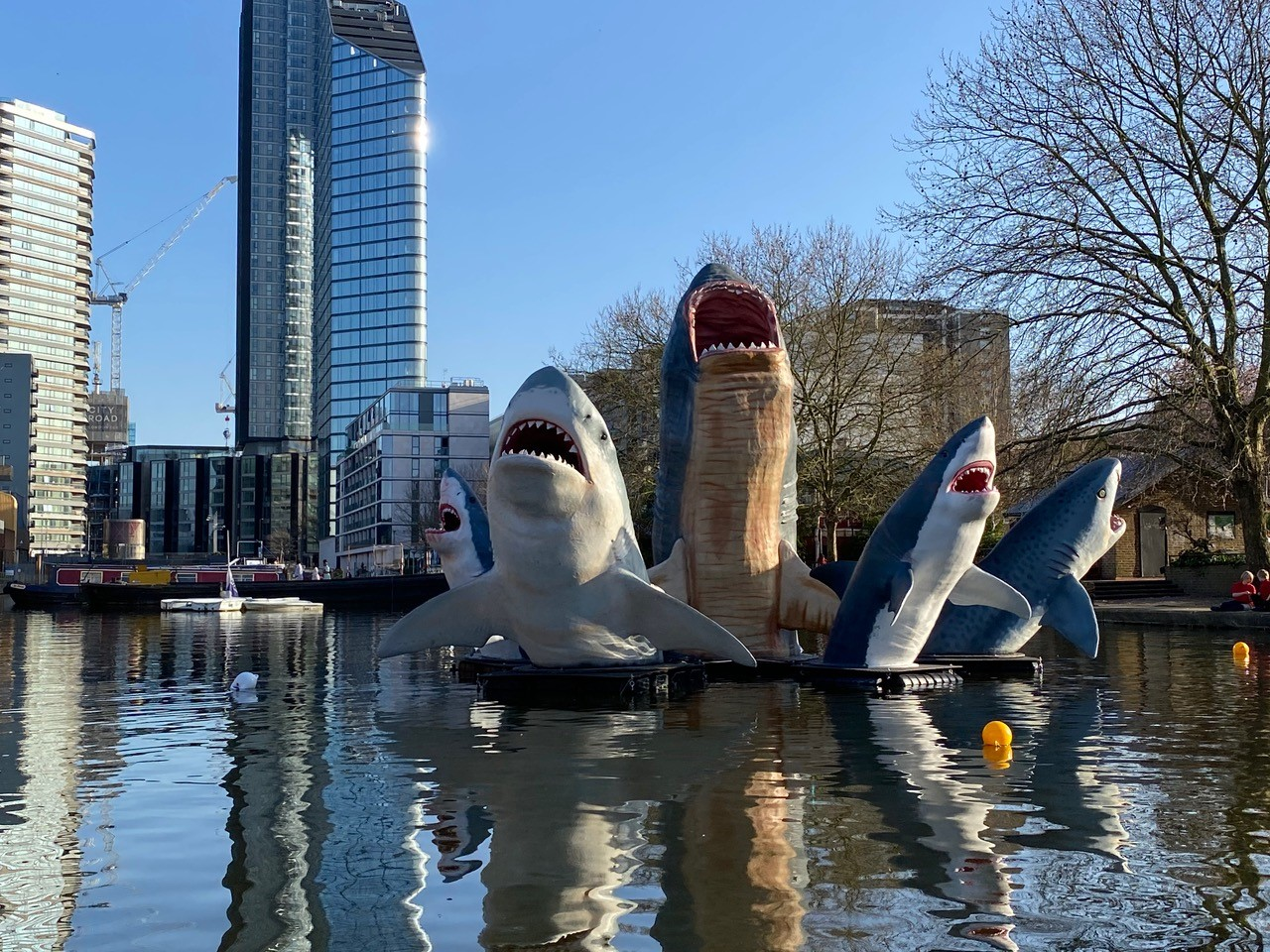
Sharks! in City Road Basin, Islington, in 2021

Sharks! is an art installation in London, England by architect Jaimie Shorten. The art was built following its concept winning the 2020 Antepavilion, an annual art contest. Currently, they are displayed on floating platforms on the Regent's Canal, in front of the art centre in repurposed docks at 55 Laburnum Street, in Hoxton within the Borough of Hackney.

== Art ==
Sharks! consists of five life-sized fibreglass model sharks. The project was inspired by The Headington Shark in Oxford. The installation cost £25,000. It was selected and built as the 2020 Antepavilion, fitting the year's theme of "tension of authoritarian governance of the built environment and aesthetic libertarianism". Shorten said that he thinks of the sharks as ingénues, that have surfaced in the "centre of hipster maelstrom" and as "dumb recipients of the horrible world" that are redeemed through being in Hoxton and "being together".

== Dispute ==
In August 2020 Hackney London Borough Council obtained an interim injunction order to prohibit Sharks! from being installed at the Regent's Canal in Hoxton. As stated in the interim injunction order, the Order was made at a hearing without notice to the Defendants. In October the council obtained a varied interim High Court injunction order to remove the work from the canal after a reconsideration hearing. In April 2021 Sharks! was relocated to Islington Boat Club but subsequently removed in June and returned to Antepavilion where they were stored on a river barge. The Court of Appeal granted permission to appeal the injunction order in July. Hackney Council lost an appeal by Antepavilion to Sharks! on the Regent's Canal in the summer of 2024. According to Antepavilion, the council now has to decide whether Sharks! requires planning permission.

== See also ==
- The Headington Shark
