= Hackney Mosaic Project =

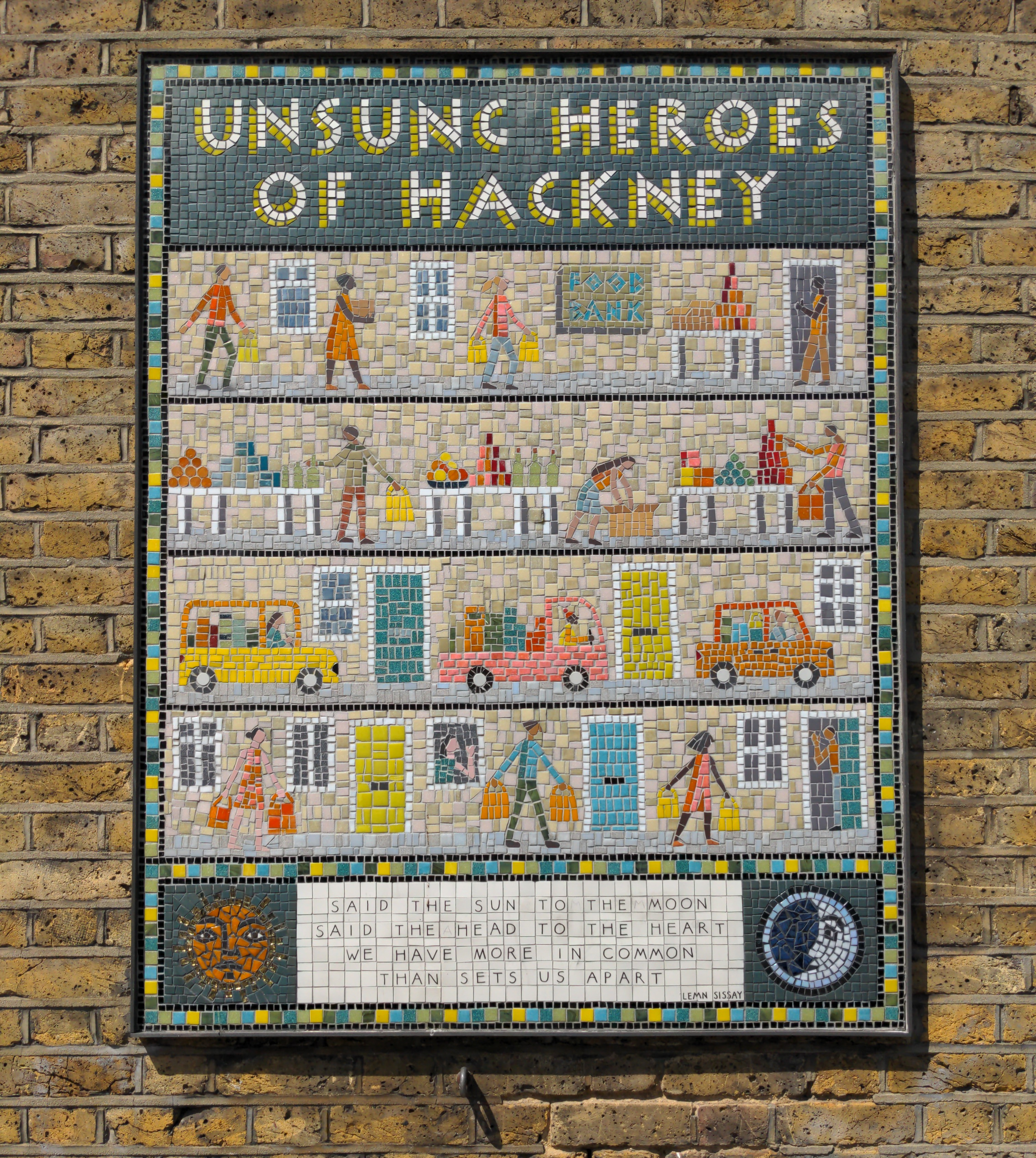
- Unsung Heroes of Hackney mosaic
- Formation: 2011; 15 years ago
- Founder: Tessa Hunkin
- Purpose: help those with addiction and mental health problems
- Location: London, United Kingdom
- Award: 2014 Mosaic of the Year
- Website: www.hackney-mosaic.co.uk

The Hackney Mosaic Project is a community project based in Hackney, London that helps people with addiction and mental health problems by teaching them to create mosaic artworks. It was started by artist Tessa Hunkin in 2011 and is made up of volunteers, many of whom are referred by Lifeline or the Hackney Recovery Service. The volunteers who often have struggles with alcohol, drugs, learning disabilities or mental illness, find that their involvement helps give them confidence and a sense of purpose.

In 2014, a jury including Dr Will Wooten, lecturer in Roman Art at King's College London, and Norma Vondee, president of British Association for Modern Mosaic, awarded the group the British Association for Modern Mosaic's 2014 Mosaic of the Year for the mosaics at Shepherdess Walk and Hoxton Varieties. The Shepherdess Walk Mosaics draw on the style of Roman mosaics but also show details from contemporary life in Hackney. One aspect that impressed the judges was both mosaics were created by the volunteers with Hunkin acting as the designer.

In November 2014, a mosaic located inside the Hackney Downs playground shelter and depicting various animals was unveiled by comedian and activist Russell Brand and Hackney councillor Jonathan McShane. The project took nine months to complete and was funded by Hackney Council.
