= Antepavilion =

British art charity

Antepavilion is an art charity in London, known for its extensive legal battles with the Hackney London Borough Council over its various art exhibits. The charity holds an annual design competition, commissioning a temporary structure to be installed at a site on the Regent's Canal, and also funds "art-craft-architecture" research, stages artistic and political events, and manages artist studio spaces.

In 2021 the charity's site was raided by London police, who arrested staff and seized equipment. London police claimed that one of the commissioned works that year was similar in design to bamboo towers constructed by protest group Extinction Rebellion.

== Competition winners ==
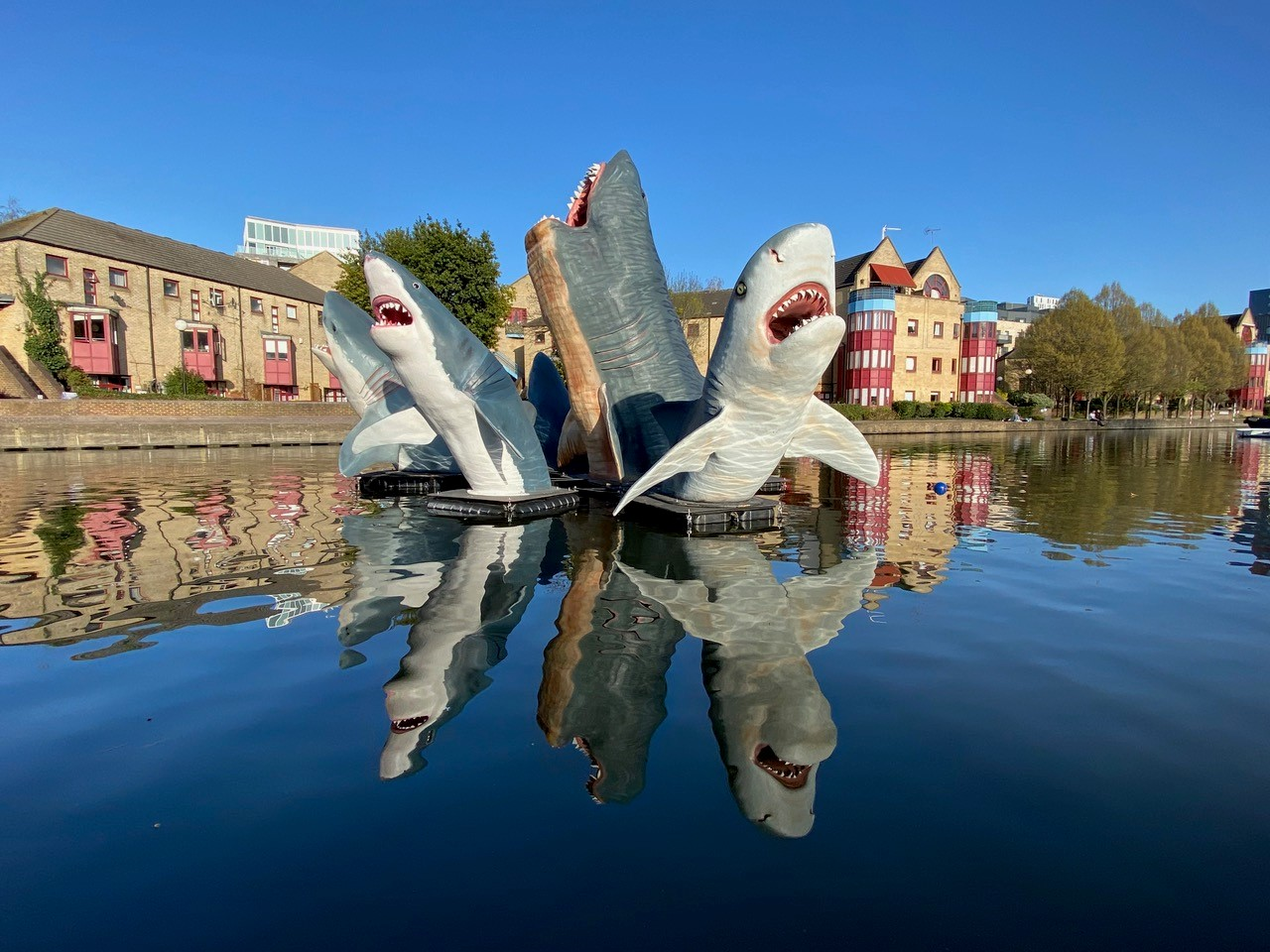
The 2020 winner, "Sharks!"

Year	Design	Artist
2017	H-VAC	PUP Architects
2018	AirDraft	Thomas Randall-Page and Benedetta Rogers
2019	Potemkin Theatre	Maich Swift Architects
2020	Sharks!	Jaimie Shorten
2021	AnteChamber	Studio Nima Sardar
2024	FOUND(ATION)	Good Shape (Lioba Pflaum & Hannah Sheerin)
2025	Moonument	George Gil (Redundant Architects Recreation Association)
