= 2nd Escort Group (Royal Navy) =

- Active: April 1943–May 1945
- Country: United Kingdom
- Allegiance: British Empire
- Branch: (United Kingdom) Royal Navy
- Type: Support Group
- Role: Anti-Submarine Warfare
- Size: ~6 ships
- Part of: Part of Western Approaches Command
- Garrison/HQ: Liverpool
- March: "A-Hunting We Will Go"
- Engagements: Operation Musketry; ON 207; HX 264; SL 140/MKS 31; JW 58

Commanders
- Commander nickname: "The Boss"
- Notable commanders: Capt. F.J. Walker; Cdr. N.W. Duck; Cdr. D.E.G. Wemyss

The 2nd Escort Group (2 EG) was a British anti-submarine formation of the Royal Navy which saw action during the Second World War, principally in the Battle of the Atlantic.

2 EG was formed in April 1943, one of five such support groups formed at the crisis point of the campaign. It was to act as reinforcement to convoys under attack, with the capacity to actively hunt and destroy U-boats, rather than be restricted to escort duties. Comprising six sloops of the Black Swan-class, the group was led by Captain F.J. "Johnnie" Walker, Britain's most successful anti-submarine warfare commander, in Starling. The combination of an active hunting group and a charismatic, determined and innovative anti-submarine specialist such as Walker proved to be a potent force; 2 EG was the most successful anti-submarine unit of the war, being credited with the destruction of 23 U-boats during two years of active service.

== Formation ==
Officially called 2nd Escort Group, it was more commonly referred to as the "2nd Support Group" (2 SG). It was formed in April 1943, one of five such support groups. Its purpose was to provide reinforcement to convoys at sea, being equipped to spend extended periods at sea moving from one convoy to another as needed. Its function primarily was to assist a convoy's escort in its defence, though it also had the facility to spend time, which escorts did not have, to continue attacks on U-boats to a successful conclusion rather than having to break off to maintain the guard on the convoy.

Walker, however, was determined that the group would be active in destroying U-boats and impressed this aim on his commanders from the outset.

The group comprised six sloops of the Black Swan class, making it a highly uniform group, and the sloop design was well suited to the task, with good endurance, adequate speed and specialized anti-submarine armament. In addition, Walker had developed a range of A/S tactics, which 2 SG became adept at, such as the "creeping attack" and the "barrage attack".

The group originally comprised:

- Starling (Capt. F.J. Walker),
- Wren (Cdr. R.M. Aubrey),
- Woodpecker (Lt.Cdr. R.E.S. Hugonin),
- Cygnet (Lt.Cdr. F.B. Proudfoot),
- Wild Goose (Lt.Cdr. D.E.G. Wemyss),
- Kite (Lt.Cdr. W.F. Segrave)

During April the group was engaged in working up and training; Starling, Wild Goose and Kite were new ships, and none had worked together before. Under Walkers training (previously the Experimental Commander at HMS Osprey, the RN Anti-submarine training school) the group became a highly effective and successful unit.

The primary goal and strategy of the 2nd Escort Group as 'hunter-killers of U-boats' was reflected in the group practice of playing the song 'A-Hunting We Will Go' upon entering and leaving harbour. This practice was emulated by other Royal Navy ships and was evidence of the change of attitude and strategy of anti-submarine units from defenders to hunter/killers of U-boats.

== History ==
=== First patrols ===
The group's first patrol in May 1943 was uneventful. There were several major convoy battles during the month, but none involving 2 SG. The group operated in support of HX 235 and ONS 8, sailing ahead in an attempt to encounter and breach any U-boat patrol lines drawn across the convoy routes.

The group's first success came in June. Its first U-boat was detected on 1 June 1943: fortuitously on a fine day, and identified by a Lt. Erle Howe Pitt, the event was dubbed another "Glorious First of June" by Walker. Over a 15-hour period the group found, tracked and destroyed U-202, in the longest hunt of the Atlantic campaign up to that point, and a vindication of the support group ethos, leaving ships free of escort responsibilities to destroy U-boats.

=== Bay offensive ===
After a refit at Liverpool, after which Cygnet departed to another group, 2SG was assigned to "Operation Musketry", an attempt in concert with Coastal Command to interdict the U-boat transit routes across the Bay of Biscay. On 24 June 1943 the group was successful in destroying U-119 and U-449, though Starling was damaged in the process of ramming U-119 and was forced to retire. Walker elected to stay with the group, exchanging commands with Wild Goose, and, after the group returned to port, with Kite. 2 SG was joined at this point by Woodcock (Lt.Cdr C. Gwinner), as a replacement for the damaged Starling.

On 30 July 1943 Walker's group saw further success when they encountered a group of three U-boats on the surface (two were vital submarine type XIV replenishment boats known as "Milk Cows") while in the Bay of Biscay. He signalled the "general chase" to his group and fired at them, causing damage that prevented them from diving. Two of the submarines, U-462, a Type XIV, and U-504, a Type IX/C40, were then sunk by Walker's group, and the second Type XIV, U-461, by Australian Short Sunderland aircraft.

But whilst the remainder of the operation saw the destruction of 20 U-boats over a nine-week period, 2 SG's time was unproductive, and no further successes were recorded.

=== Atlantic operations ===
In September 1943, after a further refit, 2 SG went to the North Atlantic, in the company of the escort carrier Tracker. The group was joined by Magpie (Lt.Cdr R.S. Abrams), while Woodpecker was in for repairs.

In October, in concert with B-7 Escort Group, the group worked in support of ON 207. No successes were recorded, although the convoy battle saw three U-boats destroyed, with no ships lost.

However, in November 1943, in operations around HX 264, 2 SG accounted for two more U-boats, U-226 and U-842. Whilst the United States Navy had had much success using carrier groups in a hunter-killer role on the mid-Atlantic route, the Royal Navy's experience was less positive. Winter gales made flying difficult and hazardous, while the need to provide protection to the carrier hampered A/S operations. 2 SG at least generally had more success operating without carrier assistance.

On 2 December SG was acting in support of SL 140/MKS 31 with 4 SG (Cdr. E.H. Chavasse). 2 SG put in a determined attack on a U-boat, (thought to be U-843), but was unsuccessful, though the battle for SL 140/MKS 31 saw the destruction of a U-boat, without loss of ships.

=== Six in one trip ===
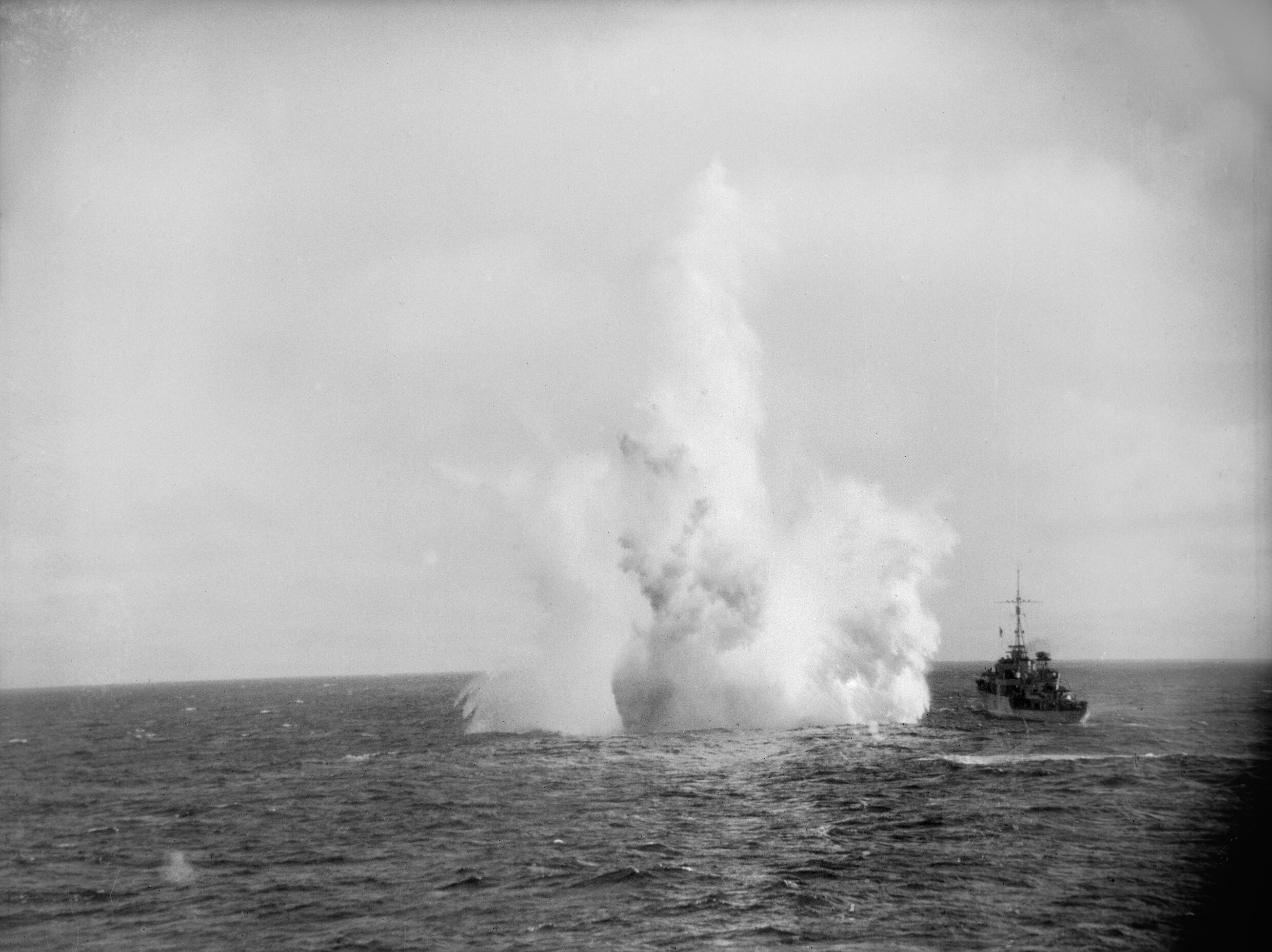
HMS Kite of the 2nd Escort Group conducting a depth charge attack.

In January 1944 2 SG sailed on its most famous exploit, accounting for six U-boats in one patrol, three of them in one 15-hour period.

On 31 January 1944 Walker's group gained their first kill of the year when they sank U-592. On 9 February his group sank U-762, U-238, and U-734 in one action, then sank U-424 on 11 February, and U-264 on 19 February. This patrol was ended on 20 February 1944, when one of Walker's group, Woodpecker, was torpedoed (possibly by U-764 or by U-256). After an 8-day struggle to get her home, Woodpecker sank in a gale off the Scillies; all of her crew were saved. Woodpecker was the only ship of 2 SG lost in action.

The group returned to its base at Liverpool to the thrilled jubilation of the city's inhabitants and the Admiralty. The First Lord of the Admiralty was present to greet Walker and his ships. Walker's seniority as Captain was backdated from 30 Jun 42 to 30 Jun 40 and awarded a second Bar to his DSO.

=== Arctic convoy ===
In March 1944 the group returned to North Atlantic, destroying U-653 on weather patrol, before joining Arctic convoy JW 58. It was joined in this for a short period by Whimbrel. 2 SG met and destroyed U-961 in transit across the "Rosegarden", but had no other success, though three U-boats were destroyed in attacks on JW 58. The return convoy, RA 58, was also attacked but neither side saw any success.

In May 1944, 2 SG responded to an attack on USS Donnell by U-473. Though starting from 300 miles away Walker, in an inspired piece of work, divined where to search and after a three-day search gained contact. An 18-hour hunt brought U-473 to the surface, where she was sunk by gunfire.

In June 1944, 2 SG was joined by Dominica, Loch Fada, and Loch Killin, replacements for Kite and Magpie. That month the group was on a search and destroy operations in the South-Western Approaches, as part of "Operation Neptune" - the invasion of Normandy, and was instrumental in preventing any attacks on the invasion fleet. In all fifteen U-boats were destroyed in attempts to attack the invasion fleet. Eight ships were sunk.

On 2 July SG received its heaviest blow when Capt. Walker died suddenly of a cerebral haemorrhage.

=== Later operations ===
In July 1944, 2 SG was back in action, led initially by Dominica (Cdr. N.A. Duck) and later by Wild Goose (Cdr. D.E.G. Wemyss).

The group had one successful patrol during August operating in the Bay of Biscay. Four U-boats, U-333, U-736, U-608, and U-385 were accounted for while attempting to cross the bay to and from their bases.

The months following this were unfruitful, however, as the U-boat Arm changed its tactics to operate in the shallow inland waters around Britain, using the schnorkel to remain submerged for entire patrols. This created a different set of tactical problems, requiring different tactics of the escorts.

=== Last successes ===
In 1945 Loch Fada and Loch Killin were transferred, to be replaced by Loch Ruthven, Tobago, and Labuan.

As 2 SG grappled with the changed nature of the campaign the group saw its last successes. In February 1945 the group destroyed two more U-boats, U-1018 and U-327(some sources say this was U-1208).

2 SG was also credited with U-683, bringing its score to 23. Wemyss reports the attack, in March 1945, but after a report of another sinking in the same area six months earlier, concluded they were "flogging a dead horse".

However a post-war report of U-683 missing in the area led to 2 SG being credited with her destruction. More recent analysis has questioned this, and the assessment was changed in 1989. It is now thought that 2 SG's attack was on the wreck of U-247, sunk in September 1944.

Despite this, 2nd Support Group was responsible for the confirmed destruction of 22 U-boats during World War II, making it the most successful anti-submarine unit of the entire conflict.
