= HMS Magpie (U82) =

Royal Navy Modified Black Swan-class sloop

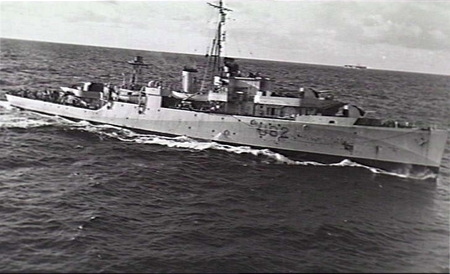
- Magpie in the Atlantic

History

United Kingdom
- Name: HMS Magpie
- Namesake: Magpie
- Builder: John I. Thornycroft & Company
- Launched: 24 March 1943
- Commissioned: 30 August 1943
- Reclassified: As a frigate in 1947
- Identification: Pennant number U82
- Fate: Scrapped 1959

General characteristics
- Class & type: Modified Black Swan-class sloop
- Displacement: 1,350 tons
- Length: 299 ft 6 in (91.29 m)
- Beam: 38 ft 6 in (11.73 m)
- Draught: 11 ft (3.4 m)
- Propulsion: Geared turbines, 2 shafts; 4,300 hp (3,200 kW)
- Speed: 20 knots (37 km/h; 23 mph)
- Range: 7,500 nmi (13,900 km; 8,600 mi) at 12 kn (22 km/h; 14 mph)
- Complement: 192
- Armament: 6 × 4-inch (102 mm) dual purpose guns (3 × 2); 4 × Bofors 40 mm guns in 2 twin mounts; 12 × 20 mm Oerlikon AA guns (6 × 2); Depth charges and Hedgehog anti-submarine mortars

Service record
- Part of: 7th Frigate Squadron (1955-1958)
- Operations: Battle of the Atlantic (1943-1945); Operation Neptune (1944)
- Victories: U-592, U-238, U-734 (1944)

HMS Magpie, pennant number U82 (later F82), was a Royal Navy Modified Black Swan-class sloop launched in 1943 and broken up in 1959. She was the seventh Royal Navy ship to bear the name. She was reclassified as a frigate in 1947, receiving a new pennant number F82. The ship was the only vessel commanded by Prince Philip, Duke of Edinburgh, who took command on 2 September 1950, when he was 29.

== Construction and design ==
Magpie was one of eight Modified Black Swan-class sloops ordered by the Admiralty on 27 March 1941 as part of the 1940 Supplemental War Programme. The Modified Black Swans were an improved version of the pre-war Black Swan-class sloops, with greater beam, allowing a heavier close-in anti-aircraft armament to be accommodated.

Magpie was 299 ft 6 in (91.29 m) long overall and 283 ft 0 in (86.26 m) between perpendiculars, with a beam of 38 feet 6 inches (11.73 m) and a draught of 11 ft 4 in (3.45 m) at deep load. Displacement of the Modified Black Swans was 1,350–1,490 long tons (1,370–1,510 t) standard and 1,880–1,950 long tons (1,910–1,980 t) deep load depending on the armament and equipment fitted. Two Admiralty three-drum water-tube boilers provided steam to Parsons geared steam turbines which drove two shafts. The machinery was rated at 4,300 shaft horsepower (3,200 kW), giving a speed of 19.75 knots (36.58 km/h; 22.73 mph).

The ship's main gun armament (as fitted to all the Modified Black Swans) consisted of three twin QF 4-inch (102 mm) Mk XVI guns, in dual purpose mounts, capable of both anti-ship and anti-aircraft use. Close-in anti-aircraft armament varied between the ships of the class, with Magpie completing with an outfit of four twin and four single Oerlikon 20 mm cannon. She was modified later in the war to mount two twin 40 mm Bofors guns, two twin and two single Oerlikon 20 mm cannon, while post war the ship's close-in armament changed again to two twin and two single Bofors guns. Anti-submarine armament consisted of a split Hedgehog anti-submarine mortar, mounted either side of the 'B' 4-inch mount, together with 110 depth charges.

Magpie was laid down at Thornycroft's Woolston, Southampton shipyard on 30 December 1941, was launched on 24 March 1943 and completed on 30 August 1943. She was the seventh ship with the name Magpie to serve with the Royal Navy.

== Service history ==
=== Second World War ===
Magpie was commissioned on 30 August 1943, the same day as completion, with the pennant number U82. Following workup of the ship and her crew at Tobermory, Mull, the ship joined the 2nd Support Group (SG2), based at Liverpool, in October 1943, for convoy escort duties in the North Atlantic. On 6 November 1943, SG2 was deployed to reinforce the escort of convoy HX264, threatened by a concentration of German U-boats southeast of Newfoundland. Early on the morning of 6 November, U-226 was sunk by the sloop Woodcock, and later that day, after a U-boat was spotted on the surface by an aircraft from the aircraft carrier Tracker, three ships of SG2 (Starling, Wild Goose and Magpie) were ordered to attack the submarine, with U-842 being sunk by depth charges from Starling and Wild Goose.

From 20 December 1943 to 20 January 1944, Magpie was refitted at Liverpool before returning to service with SG2. On 31 January 1944, SG2 was operating Southwest of Ireland in support of Convoys SL47 and MKS38 when Wild Goose detected a submarine on sonar, (U-592, which had been damaged by a US Navy P4Y-1 bomber of VPB-110 two days before and was returning to France for repairs). A series of attacks by depth charge and Hedgehog were carried out on the contact by Wild Goose, Magpie and Starling before a large explosion brought up debris, including human remains and documents confirming the U-592 was the submarine in question. U-592 had been sunk with all hands. SG2 was then deployed in support of Convoys SL147 and MKS38, threatened by the wolfpack (Note: A concentration of U-Boats directed from shore to make co-ordinated attacks against a convoy) Igel 2. On the night of 8/9 February 1944 Wild Goose first spotted a submarine which was sunk by depth charges from Woodpecker and Wild Goose, and then detected a second submarine which was sunk by Starling and Wild Goose. Meanwhile, Kite spotted a third submarine, with Magpie coming up in support. Despite Kite being narrowly missed by an acoustic torpedo and very poor sonar conditions, which made tracking the submarine difficult, the two sloops delivered a series of depth charge attacks before being joined by Starling, which directed Magpie in a Hedgehog attack, which scored two hits, with Magpie and Starling following up with two further depth charge attacks. These attacks destroyed the submarine, with a total of 252 depth charges and 48 Hedgehog projectiles expended against the submarine. Three German submarines (U-762, U-238 and U-734) had been sunk in a few hours, although it is not completely clear which submarines had been sunk by which attack. Magpie, together with Starling and Kite, were officially credited with the sinking of U-238.

In March 1944, 2SG, including Magpie, left Atlantic convoy support duties to support Arctic convoys to the Soviet Union. On 29 March, the group joined Convoy JW 58, which had set out from Loch Ewe in Scotland bound for Russia two days earlier. Late on 29 March, Starling detected the German submarine U-961, on passage from Norway to the North Atlantic, on sonar and carried out a quick depth charge attack while directing Magpie to carry out a more deliberate "creeping attack". Starling's initial attack proved fatal, however, and before Magpie could attack, a loud underwater explosion was heard followed by a stream of oil and wreckage reaching the surface, indicating U-961 had been sunk. Three more U-boats were sunk by the convoy's escorts before it reached the Kola Inlet on 4 April 1944, with none of the convoy's ships damaged. Magpie formed part of the escort for the return convoy RA 58, which left the Kola Inlet on 7 April and arrived unscathed at Loch Ewe on 14 April, with no German submarines managing to make contact with the convoy. Magpie had suffered weather damage during the two Arctic convoys, and was then under repair at Liverpool until 28 April 1944.

Magpie took part in the D-Day amphibious Allied landings in Normandy on 6 June 1944, escorting an assault convoy to Gold Beach. On return from invasion duties Magpie, joined the 22nd Escort Group, based at Greenock and escorting convoys in British coastal waters, as well as convoys to Gibraltar. On 10 May 1945, Magpie and sister ship Amethyst took the surrender of the German submarine U-249, the first German submarine to surrender in British waters following the German capitulation, off The Lizard and took the submarine into Portland Harbour.

=== Post-war operations ===
In 1946, Magpie joined the Mediterranean Fleet. Along with others in the Black Swan class she was officially reclassified as a frigate in 1947, also receiving a new pennant number F82. In March 1949, Magpie and the frigate Peacock were deployed off the Jordanian port of Aqaba in support of British forces securing that port against the approach of Israeli forces during the 1948 Palestine war. Magpie did duty in Trieste following riots there over the city's future, which was contended between Italy and Yugoslavia. At this time she was based in Malta, as part of the 3rd Frigate Flotilla. This Flotilla took part in patrols preventing illegal immigrants following the formation of Israel. She returned to Portsmouth in 1954 where was placed in reserve.

Magpie was commanded by then Lieutenant-Commander, later Admiral of the Fleet the Duke of Edinburgh from 2 September 1950 until 1951, based in the Mediterranean. In 1953 she took part in the Fleet Review to celebrate the coronation of Queen Elizabeth II. On 3 March 1955 Magpie left Portsmouth to steam to the 7th Frigate Squadron at Simonstown, South Africa. Due to be relieved at the Cape Station by her sister ship Sparrow, boiler problems meant the crew were changed. Magpie's crew returned to the UK in Sparrow.

=== End of Duty and Breakup ===
In 1958 Magpie's tour of duty at the Cape Station was finally completed; she sailed back for the UK for paying off and was broken up by Hughes Bolckow, Blyth, Northumberland on 12 July 1959.

In 1959 HMS Magpies ship's bell and her division trophies were presented to Monkton Combe Junior School, near Bath whose magpie icon, created in 1951 by the school's art teacher Miss E Bulmer for the school's Magpie Magazine, had been adopted by the ship in 1952 with the active support of Prince Philip. The icon has been used as the crest for all subsequent HMS Magpies and is still in use in 2025 by HMS Magpie (H130). Monkton Prep School continues to use the Magpie name for its magazine. The bell still hangs in the school in 2025.

=== Filmography ===
HMS Magpie stood in for the moving shots of HMS Amethyst in the film Yangtse Incident in 1957.
