= HMS Kite (U87) =

Sloop of the Royal Navy

Coordinates: 73°01′N 3°57′E

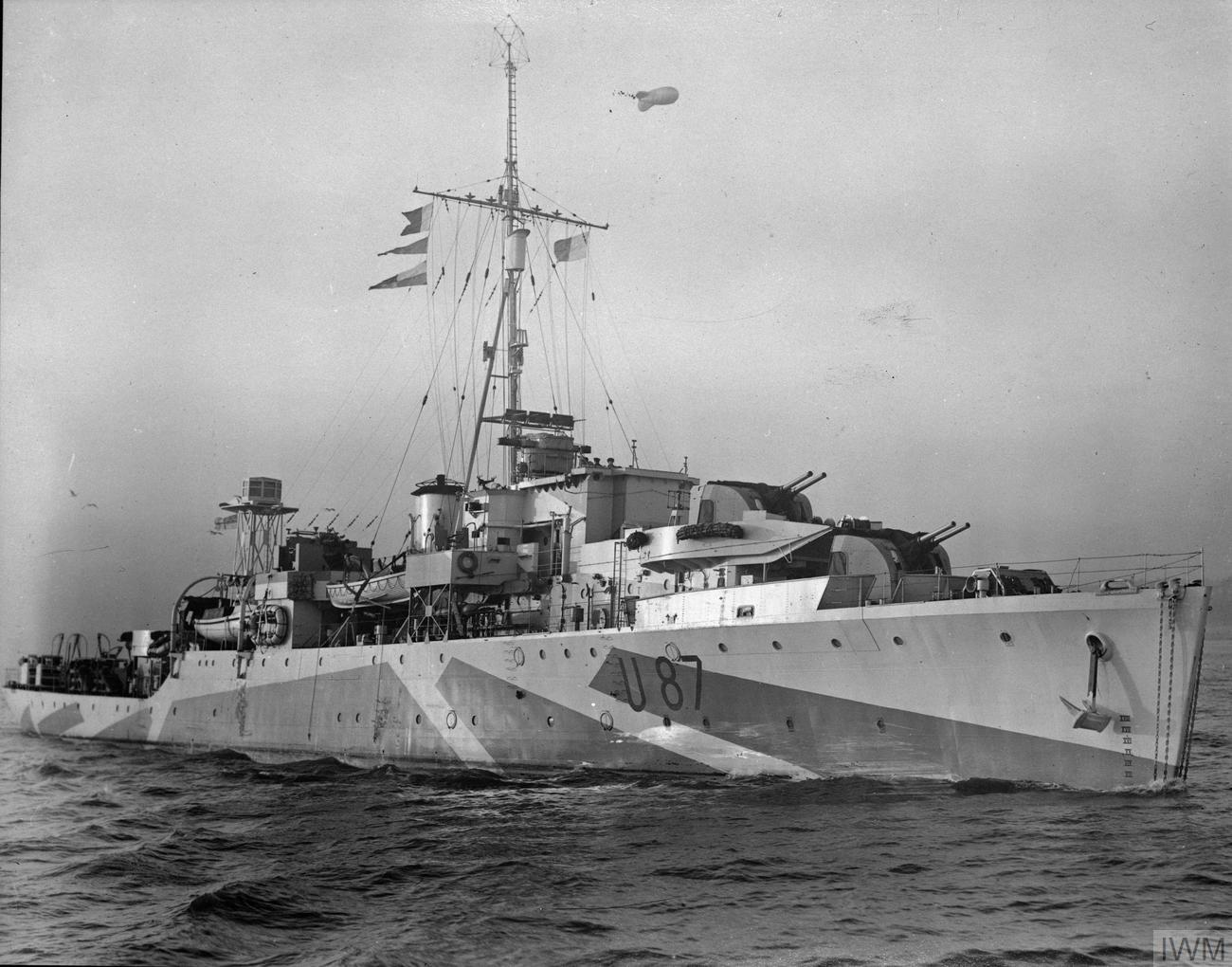
- HMS Kite in March 1943

History

United Kingdom
- Name: HMS Kite
- Namesake: Kite
- Builder: Cammell Laird
- Launched: 13 October 1942
- Commissioned: 1 March 1943
- Fate: Sunk on 21 August 1944

General characteristics
- Class & type: Modified Black Swan-class sloop
- Displacement: 1,350 tons
- Length: 299 ft 6 in (91.29 m)
- Beam: 38 ft 6 in (11.73 m)
- Draught: 11 ft (3.4 m)
- Propulsion: Geared turbines, 2 shafts; 4,300 hp (3,200 kW)
- Speed: 20 knots (37 km/h)
- Range: 7,500 nmi (13,900 km) at 12 kn (22 km/h)
- Complement: 192
- Armament: 6 × 4-inch (102 mm) AA guns (3 × 2); 4 × 2-pdr AA pom-pom; 12 × 20 mm Oerlikon AA (6 × 2)

HMS Kite (U87) was a modified Black Swan-class sloop of the Royal Navy, once commanded by the famous U-boat hunter Captain Frederic John Walker. She was one of several ships of that class that took part in the famous "six in one trip" in 1944 (in which six U-boats were sunk in one patrol).

Named after the bird of the same name, she was built at Cammell Laird shipyard, Birkenhead, on the banks of the river Mersey (she was to later to be based across the river in Gladstone Dock, Bootle). She was launched on 13 October 1942 and commissioned on 1 March 1943.

== Operational Service ==
Kite took part in the sinking of five U-boats together with several sister ships:

- On 24 June 1943 U-449 was sunk near Cape Ortegal, Spain by the sloops Wren, Woodpecker, Kite and Wild Goose.
- On 30 July 1943 U-462 was sunk in the Bay of Biscay by a Handley-Page Halifax aircraft and Wren, Kite, Woodpecker, Wild Goose and Woodcock.
- On 30 July 1943 U-504 was sunk near Cape Ortegal by Kite, Woodpecker, Wren and Wild Goose.
- On 6 November 1943 U-226 was sunk east of Newfoundland by Starling, Woodcock and Kite.
- On 9 February 1944 U-238 was sunk south-west of Ireland by Kite, Magpie and Starling.

On 20 August 1944 Kite was escorting the aircraft carriers Vindex and Striker, which in turn were escorting convoy JW 59 to Northern Russia when the convoy was sighted in the Barents Sea by German aircraft. Soon a pack of U-boats attacked the convoy and one U-boat was sunk by Fairey Swordfish aircraft from one of the carriers. Two more were sunk by other destroyers.

At 06:30 on 21 August, Kite slowed to 6 knots (11 km/h) to untangle her "foxers" (anti-acoustic torpedo noise makers, towed astern). The decision to do so, rather than severing the foxers' cables and abandoning them, was made by her temporary commander, Lt Cdr Campbell, a submariner. At that speed Kite was a sitting duck, and she was hit by two torpedoes from U-344 (commanded by Oberleutnant Ulrich Pietsch) and sank.

Of Kite's crew of 10 officers and 207 ratings, 60 initially survived the attack, but from the freezing Arctic water only 14 sailors were picked up alive by HMS Keppel. Five of the rescued died on board Keppel leaving only nine to make it to shore. U-344 was sunk the next day by a single patrolling Swordfish from Vindex, piloted by Gordon Bennett, which dropped out of the cloud, surprising the U-boat on the surface, a single depth charge exploded beneath the U-boat, sinking her with all hands.

== Six in One ==
The U-boats sunk in the 6 in 1 patrol were as follows: U-592 - 31 January (Type VIIC) U-762 - 8 February (Type VIIC) U-734 - 9 February (Type VIIC) U-238 - 9 February (Type VIIC) U-424 - 11 February (Type VIIC) U-264 - 19 February (Type VIIC)

== HMS Kite Memorial ==
On 21 August 2004, the 60th anniversary of Kite's sinking a memorial stone was unveiled in the Braintree and Bocking Public Gardens.
