= HMS Starling (U66) =

Sloop of the Royal Navy

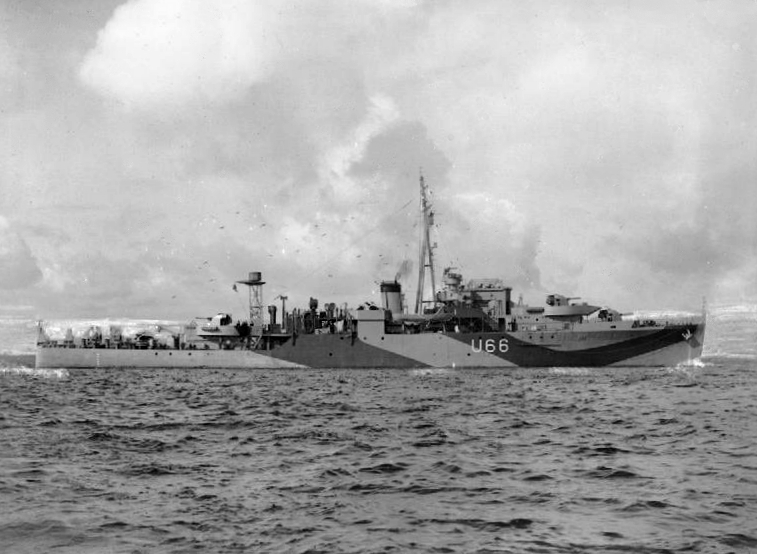
- HMS Starling underway, in 1943

History

United Kingdom
- Name: HMS Starling
- Namesake: Starling
- Builder: Fairfield Shipbuilding and Engineering Company, Govan
- Laid down: 21 October 1941
- Launched: 14 October 1942
- Completed: 1 April 1943
- Reclassified: As a frigate in 1947
- Fate: Broken up July 1965

General characteristics
- Class & type: Modified Black Swan-class sloop
- Displacement: 1,350 tons
- Length: 299 ft 6 in (91.29 m)
- Beam: 38 ft 6 in (11.73 m)
- Draught: 11 ft (3.4 m)
- Propulsion: Geared turbines, 2 shafts; 4,300 hp (3.21 MW)
- Speed: 20 knots (37 km/h)
- Range: 7,500 nmi (13,900 km) at 12 kn (22 km/h)
- Complement: 192
- Armament: 6 × 4-inch (102 mm) AA guns (3 × 2); 4 × 2-pounder (40 mm) AA pom-poms; 12 × 20 mm Oerlikon AA guns (6 × 2); 8 x Depth charge throwers, 2 x rails: 110 d/c

Service record
- Part of: 2nd Support Group
- Commanders: Frederick John Walker
- Operations: Battle of the Atlantic; Arctic convoys; Operation Neptune
- Victories: 15 U-boats (shared)

HMS Starling, pennant number U66, was a modified Black Swan-class sloop of the Royal Navy. She was active in the Battle of the Atlantic during the Second World War and was the most successful anti-submarine warfare vessel of the Royal Navy, being credited with the destruction of fourteen U-boats.

== Construction ==
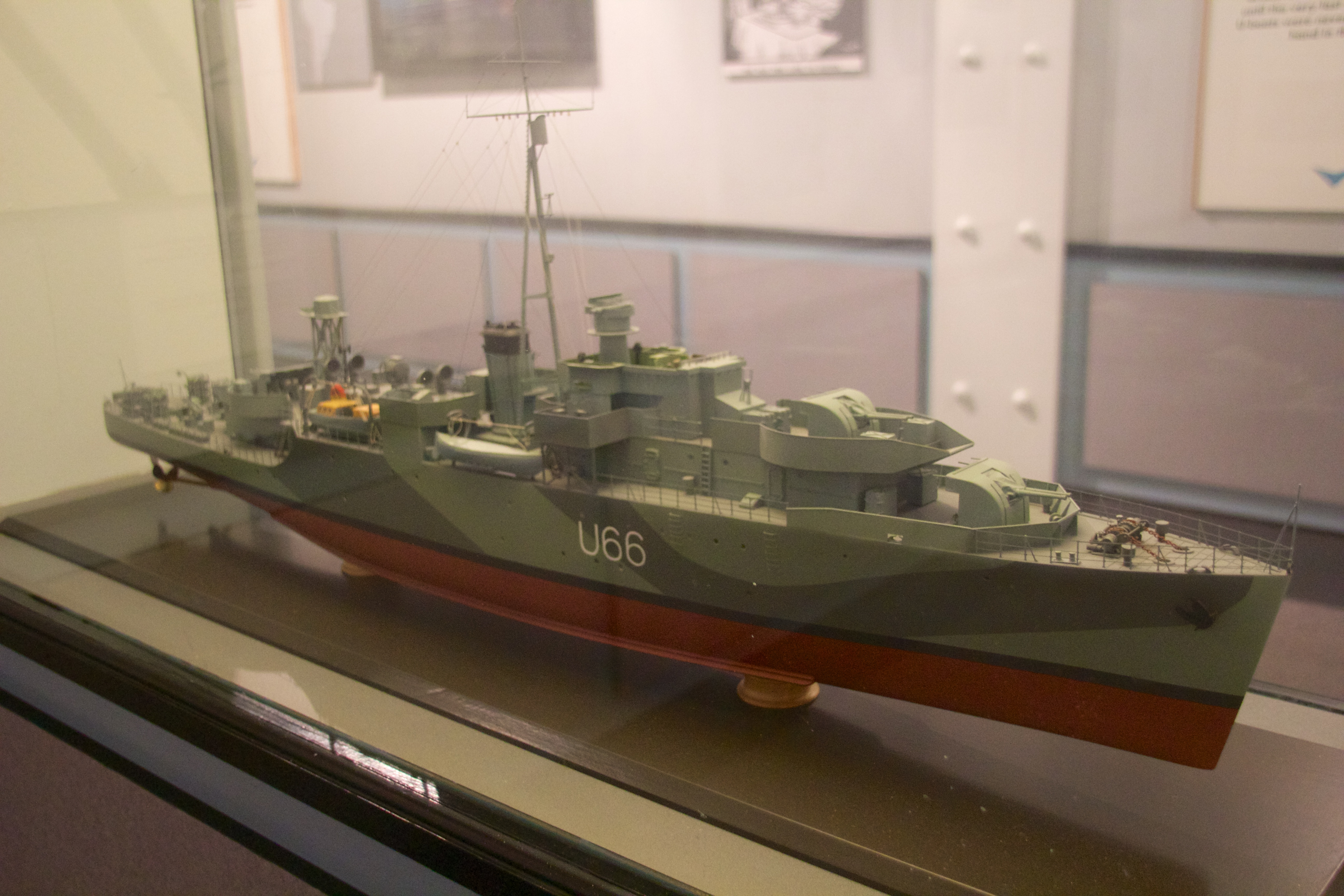
Model of Starling on display in the Merseyside Maritime Museum.

Starling was ordered on 18 July 1941 under the 1940 Supplementary War Building Programme; she was laid down by Fairfield Shipbuilding and Engineering Company at Govan, Scotland, on 21 October 1941. She was launched on 14 October 1942, and commissioned on 1 April 1943, with a build time of 17 months and 10 days.

== Service history ==
Starling joined Western Approaches Command in April 1943 under the command of Captain Frederic John Walker, leader of the 2nd Support Group (2SG). This was a flotilla of six sloops not tied down to convoy protection, but free to hunt down U-boats wherever found. The other ships of the group were Cygnet, Kite, Wild Goose, Woodpecker, and Wren.

Starling's first patrol in May 1943 was uneventful; There were several major convoy battles during the month, but none involving 2SG. Starling's first success came on 1 June 1943, when the group's first U-boat was detected: fortuitously on a fine day and identified by Lieutenant Erle Howe Pitt. This event was dubbed another "Glorious First of June" by Walker. Over a 15-hour period the group found, tracked and destroyed U-202, in the longest hunt of the Atlantic campaign up to that point.

On their return to Liverpool, Starling and 2SG were assigned to "Operation Musketry", an attempt, in concert with Coastal Command, to interdict the U-boat transit routes across the Bay of Biscay. On 24 June 1943 the group was successful in destroying two U-boats; Starling destroyed U-119, but was damaged when she rammed the U-boat to dispatch it. She was forced to return to Britain for repairs, under the temporary command of Commander D. E. G. Wemyss of Wild Goose, Walker staying with the group.

In October, on returning to the group, Starling was involved in the battle around convoy ON 207. No successes were recorded, though the convoy battle saw three U-boats destroyed, with no ships lost.

In November 1943, in operations around HX 264, Starling and 2SG accounted for two more U-boats: U-226 and U-842.

In December, while in support of convoy SL 140/MKS 31, Starling attacked and damaged U-843, forcing it to abandon its attack.

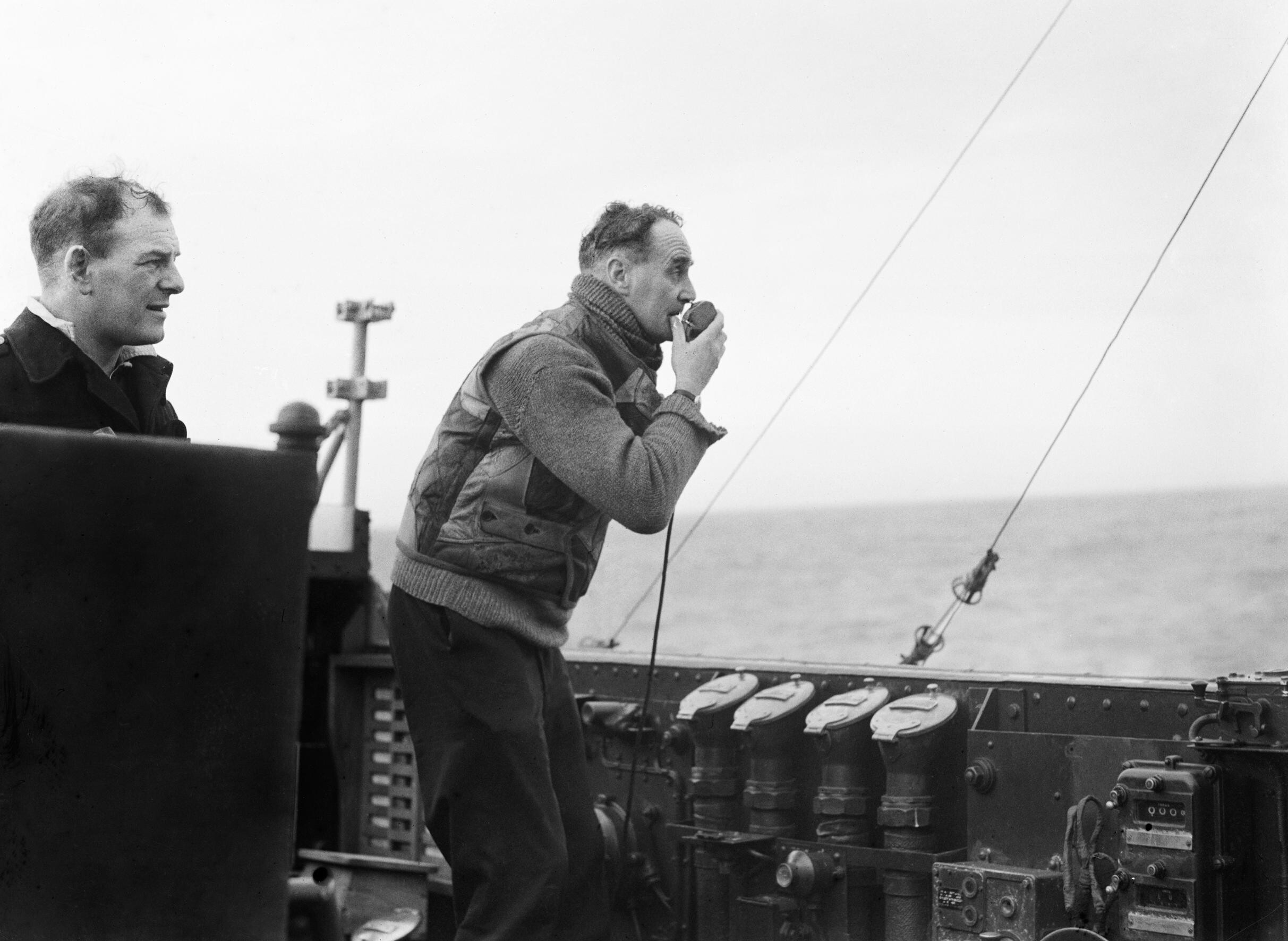
Captain Walker on board Starling during an anti-submarine operation in January or February 1944

In January 1944, supporting convoy SL 147/MKS 38, Starling shared in the destruction of U-592.

In February she took part in the famous "Six in one trip" episode, where 2SG destroyed six U-boats over a two-week period. Starling shared in the destruction of four of these: U-592 on 31 January, U-734 and U-238 on 9 February, and U-264 on 19 February.

In March 1944, Starling and 2SG, accompanied by the escort carrier HMS Vindex, sought and destroyed U-653, a U-boat on weather-reporting duty in the North Atlantic. Later that month, while supporting Murmansk convoy JW 58, Starling destroyed U-961 in transit to the North Atlantic. She had no other success, though three U-boats were destroyed in attacks on JW 58.

In May the group responded to an attack on USS Donnell by U-473. Though starting from 300 miles away, Walker, in an inspired piece of work, divined where to search and after a three-day search made contact. An 18-hour hunt brought U-473 to the surface, where she was sunk by gunfire.

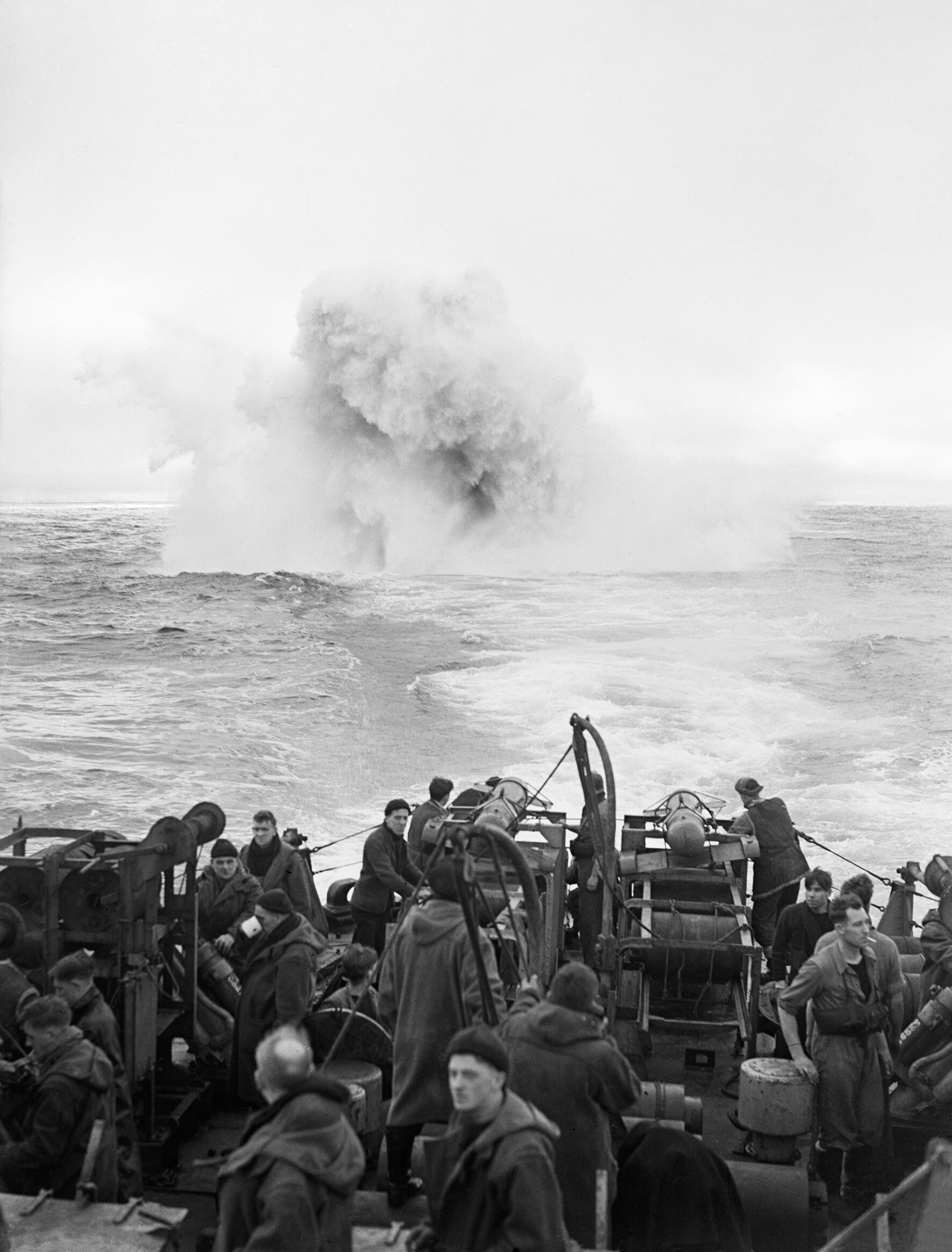
Depth charges detonate astern of Starling

In June Starling was part of "Operation Neptune" in support of the Normandy landings, and was instrumental in preventing any attacks on the invasion fleet. In all, 15 U-boats were destroyed in attempts to attack the invasion fleet, though Starling herself had no success.

In July Starling suffered her heaviest blow when Capt. FJ Walker died of a cerebral haemorrhage, brought on by overwork and exhaustion.

Under her new captain, Commander N. W. Duck, Starling and 2SG had another successful patrol in the Bay of Biscay in August when four U-boats were destroyed; Starling took part in three of these actions, against U-333, U-736, and U-385.

In September Starling moved to 22EG, under Commander G. W. E. Castens, but the U-boat war had changed character, and Starling saw little further success. The campaign became a hunt for single raiders operating in the shallow coastal waters, where a U-boat could hide among the wrecks on the sea bottom. Hunts for these "lone wolves" was a slow and tedious business, though merchant ship losses were kept to a minimum.

In January 1945 Starling, with ships of 22EG, attacked a promising target in the North Channel. They were credited, following examination of German records in the post-war period, with the destruction of U-482. However this assessment was re-evaluated in 1991, and the credit was withdrawn; the attack was deemed to have been on a non-submarine target.

With the end of the war in Europe Starling was earmarked for duty in the Pacific, but while re-fitting for this, the war there ended. In September 1945, Starling paid off, and in October went into reserve.

== Post-war service ==
In 1946, Starling was re-activated for service with HMS Dryad, the Royal Navy's Navigation Training School. She was modified as a navigation training ship and remained in service for the next ten years.

In 1953, she took part in the Fleet Review to celebrate the Coronation of Queen Elizabeth II.

In 1956, her last year in commission, she visited the Norwegian fjords and the U-boat base at Kiel. Her final voyage was a call at Bootle, Liverpool, to attend a farewell celebration provided by the local authorities, and Captain Walker's widow took passage on the final sailing from Bootle to Portsmouth, where Starling paid off.

== Battle honours ==
- Biscay 1943
- Atlantic 1943–45
- Arctic 1944
- Normandy 1944

== Successes ==
Starling participated in the sinking of fourteen U-boats:

Date	U-boat	Type	Location	Notes
2 June 1943	U-202	Type VIIC	North Atlantic; 56°12′N 39°52′W	sunk, depth charges and gunfire from Starling.
24 June 1943	U-119	Type XB	N Atlantic, NW of Cape Ortegal; 44°59′N 12°24′W	sunk, gunfire, ramming, by Starling.
6 November 1943	U-226	VIIC	N Atlantic, east of Cape Race; 44°49′N 41°13′W	sunk, d/c by Starling, Woodcock and Kite.
6 November 1943	U-842	Type IXC/40	North Atlantic; 43°42′N 42°08′W	sunk, d/c by Starling and Wild Goose.
31 January 1944	U-592	VIIC	N Atlantic, south-west of Cape Clear; 50°20′N 17°29′W	sunk, d/c by Starling, Wild Goose and Magpie.
9 February 1944	U-734	VIIC	Atlantic; 49°43′N 16°23′W	sunk, d/c by Wild Goose and Starling.
9 February 1944	U-238	VIIC	Atlantic, south-west of Cape Clear; 49°44′N 16°07′W	sunk, d/c, hedgehog, by Kite, Magpie and Starling.
19 February 1944	U-264	VIIC	North Atlantic; 48°31′N 22°05′W	sunk, d/c by Woodpecker and Starling.
15 March 1944	U-653	VIIC	North Atlantic; 53°46′N 24°35′W	found by Swordfish A/825 from Vindex, d/c by Starling and Wild Goose.
29 March 1944	U-961	VIIC	Atlantic, north of Faroes; 64°31′N 03°19′W	sunk, by Starling, Magpie.
6 May 1944	U-473	VIIC	Atlantic, west of Cape Clear; 49°29′N 21°22′W	sunk, d/c, gunfire by Starling, Wren and Wild Goose.
31 July 1944	U-333	VIIC	English Channel, west of the Scilly Isles; 49°39′N 07°28′W	sunk, d/c by Starling and the frigate Loch Killin.
6 August 1944	U-736	VIIC	Atlantic, west of St. Nazaire; 47°19′N 04°16′W	sunk, Squid, d/c by Starling and Loch Killin.
11 August 1944	U-385	VIIC	Bay of Biscay, west of La Rochelle; 46°16′N 02°45′W	sunk, d/c, air attack by Starling and Sunderland P/461.

During the war the Starling was credited, along with the sloops Amethyst, Peacock, Hart, and frigate Loch Craggie, with sinking the U-482 in the North Channel on 16 January 1945. The British Admiralty withdrew this credit in a post-war reassessment.

== In popular culture ==
- Starling's service in the Arctic convoys (fictionalised as "HMS Sparrow") is described in the prologue to children's adventure novel The Salt-stained Book by Julia Jones (2011).

== Sources ==
- Blair, Clay (1998). Hitler's U-Boat War: The Hunted 1942–1945. ISBN 0-304-35261-6.
- Gardiner, Robert; Chesneau, Roger, eds. (1980). Conway's All The World's Fighting Ships 1922–1946. London: Conway Maritime Press. ISBN 0-85177-146-7.
- Arnold Hague : The Allied Convoy System 1939–1945 (2000). ISBN 1-55125-033-0 (Canada); ISBN 1-86176-147-3 (UK).
- Kemp, Paul (1997). U-Boats Destroyed, German submarine losses in the World Wars. Arms and Armour. ISBN 1-85409-515-3.
- Niestle, Axel (1998). German U-Boat Losses During World War II. Greenhill. ISBN 1-85367-352-8.
- Warlow, B : Battle Honours of the Royal Navy (2004) ISBN 1-904459-05-6
- Wemyss, DEG : Relentless Pursuit: The Story of Capt. FJ Walker CB.DSO***RN, U-Boat Hunter and Destroyer (2003) Cerberus Publishing ISBN 1841450235 (First published in 1955)

Burn, Alan (1993). The Fighting Captain. ISBN 0-85052-555-1.

== Publications ==
- Colledge, J. J.; Warlow, Ben (2006) [1969]. Ships of the Royal Navy: The Complete Record of All Fighting Ships of the Royal Navy from the 15th Century to the Present (3rd Rev ed.). London: Chatham Publishing. ISBN 978-1-86176-281-8. OCLC 67375475.
- Hague, Arnold (1993). Sloops: A History of the 71 Sloops Built in Britain and Australia for the British, Australian and Indian Navies 1926–1946. Kendal, England: World Ship Society. ISBN 0-905617-67-3.
