= HMS Wren (U28) =

Sloop of the Royal Navy

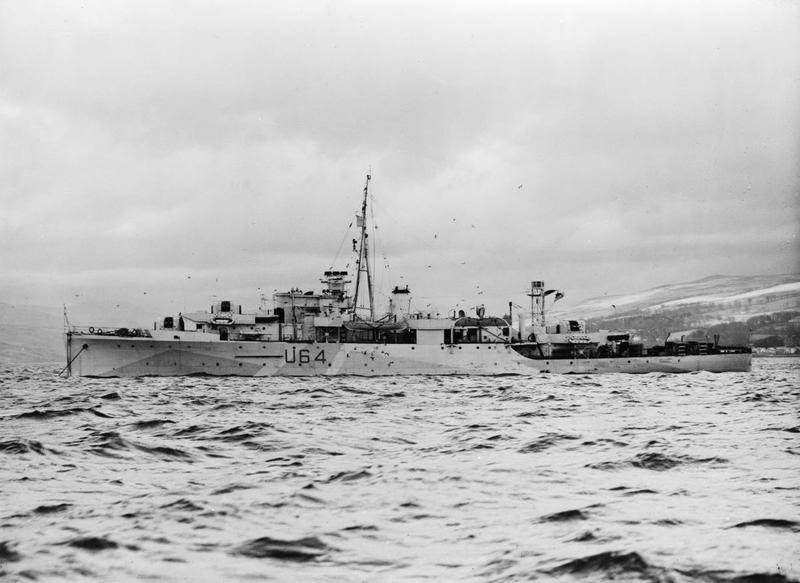
- HMS Wren, at sea during WWII

History

United Kingdom
- Name: HMS Wren
- Builder: William Denny & Brothers
- Laid down: 27 February 1941
- Launched: 11 August 1942
- Commissioned: 4 February 1943
- Identification: Pennant number U28/F28
- Motto: Ex parvulis magna: 'From small things develop great'
- Fate: Scrapped in 1956
- Badge: On a Field Blue, a Wren on a branch, all Gold.

General characteristics
- Class & type: Black Swan-class sloop
- Displacement: 1,300 tons (standard)
- Length: 299 ft 6 in (91.29 m)
- Beam: 37 ft 6 in (11.43 m)
- Draught: 11 ft (3.4 m)
- Installed power: 3,600 shp (2.68 MW)
- Propulsion: Geared turbines, 2 shafts
- Speed: 19 knots (35 km/h)
- Range: 7,500 nmi (13,900 km) at 12 kn (22 km/h)
- Complement: 180
- Armament: 6 × 4-inch (102 mm) AA guns (3 × 2); 4 × 2-pounder AA pom-pom; 2 DCT, 2 rails, 60 d/c

HMS Wren (U28) was a Black Swan-class sloop of the Royal Navy. She was active during the Second World War and was a successful anti-submarine warfare vessel, being credited with the destruction of five U-boats.

== Background and funding ==
Members of the Women's Royal Naval Service (Wrens) contributed a day's pay each to a memorial fund for the 22 Wrens killed during the torpedoing of Aguila in 1941, and the fund, in turn, contributed £4,000 towards the sloop's construction. The sloop was popularly identified with the Wrens throughout its war service, and received frequent visits from them when in port.

== Construction ==
Wren was ordered on 13 April 1940 under the 1940 Building Programme; she was laid down by William Denny & Brothers of Dumbarton on 27 February 1941. Launched on 11 August 1942 she was completed on 4 February 1943, with a build time of 23 months and 5 days. The Black Swan class sloops were subject to numerous modifications during the building process, so much so that the design was revised, later ships (of the 1941 Programme and onwards) being described as the Modified Black Swan class. Although Wren was laid down under the original design, she was completed later than some of the Modified class ships, and with the modifications during her build was indistinguishable from the later Modified Black Swan vessels.

She was adopted by the Civil community of Knutsford and Northwich in Cheshire, as part of the Warship Week National Saving programme in 1942.

== Service history ==
Wren was commissioned on 4 February 1943 and, after working up, was assigned to F. J. Walker's 2nd Support Group, the most successful anti-submarine warfare unit of the Royal Navy during the Second World War.

In February, Wren and the 2nd Support Group were on support duty in the Atlantic, although they saw little action.

In June, the group was assigned to the Bay of Biscay in support of Coastal Command's Operation Musketry, a programme of RAF and Fleet Air Arm air patrols over the area. On 24 June, Wren, with others, located and destroyed U-449 off Cape Ortegal.

On 30 July, the group engaged three U-boats already under air attack. All three were destroyed, with Wren sharing credit for the sinking of U-504.

Following a refit in autumn 1943, Wren rejoined the group and provided support to inbound convoy SL 147/MKS 38, which was under attack by the Igel group, and to Atlantic convoys HX 278 and ON 224, which were under attack by the Hai group.

In late March 1944, Wren and the group escorted JW 58, an Arctic convoy, which saw four U-boats destroyed during a five-day running battle.

In May, back in the Atlantic, Wren took part in the destruction of U-473 after a prolonged search and a "hunt to exhaustion".

During June and July, Wren and the 2nd Support Group operated in the Channel as part of Operation Neptune, providing protection for the Allied invasion force against U-boat attack. In August, Wren and others destroyed U-608 off the French coast.

After a further refit, Wren was reassigned in January 1945 to the 22nd Escort Group, conducting anti-submarine patrols off the British coast.

In March 1945, Wren was nominated to join the British Pacific Fleet, but had not done so by August, when the war in the Far East ended. She was paid off, but re-commissioned in 1946 for service in the Middle East. In April 1949, she commenced a refit at Malta Dockyard. This involved the removal of the anti-submarine equipment on the quarterdeck, which was replaced with additional accommodation. She was eventually paid off in 1955 and sold for scrap, arriving at Rosyth for breaking up on 2 February 1956.

== Battle honours ==
During her service Wren was awarded four battle honours.

- Atlantic 1943–45
- Biscay 1943–44
- Normandy 1944
- Arctic 1944

== Successes ==
During her service Wren was credited with the destruction of five U-boats.

Date	U-boat	Type	Location	Notes
24 June 1943	U-449	VIIC	Biscay, N of Cape Ortegal; 45°00′N 11°59′W	attacked by Wren, Woodpecker, Kite, Wild Goose
30 July 1943	U-462	XIV	Biscay; 45°33′N 10°38′W	attacked by Hal S/502, Wren, Kite, Woodpecker, Wild Goose
30 July 1943	U-504	IXC/40	Biscay; 45°33′N 10°56′W	attacked by Kite, Woodpecker, Wren, Wild Goose
6 May 1944	U-473	VIIC	W of Cape Clear; 49°29′N 21°22′W	attacked by Starling, Wren, Wild Goose
10 August 1944	U-608	VIIC	Biscay, SW of St Nazaire; 46°30′N 03°08′W	attacked by Lib C/53, Wren, Loch Killin
