= German submarine U-473 =

German World War II submarine

History

Nazi Germany
- Name: U-473
- Ordered: 20 January 1941
- Builder: Deutsche Werke, Kiel
- Yard number: 304
- Laid down: 1 December 1941
- Launched: 17 April 1943
- Commissioned: 16 June 1943
- Fate: Sunk on 6 May 1944

General characteristics
- Class & type: Type VIIC submarine
- Displacement: 769 tonnes (757 long tons) surfaced; 871 t (857 long tons) submerged
- Length: 67.10 m (220 ft 2 in) o/a; 50.50 m (165 ft 8 in) pressure hull
- Beam: 6.20 m (20 ft 4 in) o/a; 4.70 m (15 ft 5 in) pressure hull
- Height: 9.60 m (31 ft 6 in)
- Draught: 4.74 m (15 ft 7 in)
- Installed power: 2,800–3,200 PS (2,100–2,400 kW; 2,800–3,200 bhp) (diesels); 750 PS (550 kW; 740 shp) (electric)
- Propulsion: 2 shafts; 2 × diesel engines; 2 × electric motors.
- Speed: 17.7 knots (32.8 km/h; 20.4 mph) surfaced; 7.6 knots (14.1 km/h; 8.7 mph) submerged
- Range: 8,500 nmi (15,700 km; 9,800 mi) at 10 knots (19 km/h; 12 mph) surfaced; 80 nmi (150 km; 92 mi) at 4 knots (7.4 km/h; 4.6 mph) submerged
- Test depth: 230 m (750 ft); Crush depth: 250–295 m (820–968 ft)
- Complement: 4 officers, 40–56 enlisted
- Armament: 5 × 53.3 cm (21 in) torpedo tubes (four bow, one stern); 14 × torpedoes or 26 TMA mines; 1 × 8.8 cm (3.46 in) deck gun (220 rounds); 1 × twin 2 cm (0.79 in) C/30 anti-aircraft gun

Service record
- Part of: 5th U-boat Flotilla; 16 June – 31 December 1943; 9th U-boat Flotilla; 1 January – 6 May 1944
- Identification codes: M 52 367
- Commanders: Kptlt. Heinz Sternberg; 16 June 1943 – 6 May 1944
- Operations: 2 patrols: 1st patrol: 27 March – 18 April 1944; 2nd patrol: 24 April – 6 May 1944
- Victories: 1 warship total loss (1,400 tons)

German submarine U-473 was a Type VIIC U-boat of Nazi Germany's Kriegsmarine during World War II.

She carried out two patrols. She caused a warship to be declared a total loss.

She was sunk by British warships west southwest of Ireland on 6 May 1944.

== Design ==
German Type VIIC submarines were preceded by the shorter Type VIIB submarines. U-473 had a displacement of 769 tonnes (757 long tons) when at the surface and 871 tonnes (857 long tons) while submerged. She had a total length of 67.10 m (220 ft 2 in), a pressure hull length of 50.50 m (165 ft 8 in), a beam of 6.20 m (20 ft 4 in), a height of 9.60 m (31 ft 6 in), and a draught of 4.74 m (15 ft 7 in). The submarine was powered by two Germaniawerft F46 four-stroke, six-cylinder supercharged diesel engines producing a total of 2,800 to 3,200 metric horsepower (2,060 to 2,350 kW; 2,760 to 3,160 shp) for use while surfaced, two Siemens-Schuckert GU 343/38–8 double-acting electric motors producing a total of 750 metric horsepower (550 kW; 740 shp) for use while submerged. She had two shafts and two 1.23 m (4 ft) propellers. The boat was capable of operating at depths of up to 230 metres (750 ft).

The submarine had a maximum surface speed of 17.7 knots (32.8 km/h; 20.4 mph) and a maximum submerged speed of 7.6 knots (14.1 km/h; 8.7 mph). When submerged, the boat could operate for 80 nautical miles (150 km; 92 mi) at 4 knots (7.4 km/h; 4.6 mph); when surfaced, she could travel 8,500 nautical miles (15,700 km; 9,800 mi) at 10 knots (19 km/h; 12 mph). U-473 was fitted with five 53.3 cm (21 in) torpedo tubes (four fitted at the bow and one at the stern), fourteen torpedoes, one 8.8 cm (3.46 in) SK C/35 naval gun, 220 rounds, and one twin 2 cm (0.79 in) C/30 anti-aircraft gun. The boat had a complement of between forty-four and sixty.

== Service history ==
The submarine was laid down on 1 December 1941 at the Deutsche Werke in Kiel as yard number 304, launched on 17 April 1943 and commissioned on 16 June under the command of Kapitänleutnant Heinz Sternberg.

She served with the 5th U-boat Flotilla from 16 June 1943 for training and the 9th U-boat Flotilla from 1 January 1944 for operations.

=== 1st patrol ===
U-473's first patrol was preceded by a short journey from Kiel in Germany to Bergen in Norway. The patrol itself began when the boat departed Bergen on 27 March 1944. She passed through the gap separating Iceland and the Faroe Islands and out into the Atlantic Ocean. She docked at Lorient in occupied France on 18 April.

=== 2nd patrol and loss ===
The U-boat departed Lorient on 24 April 1944 for her second foray. On the 28th, she was attacked by a Handley Page Halifax of No. 58 Squadron RAF. No damage was inflicted on U-473 but the aircraft was hit five times before only just returning to base.

She was attacked again by a Polish-manned Vickers Wellington of 304 Squadron a day later. The boat was not damaged in this inconclusive encounter, but kept the aircraft at a respectful distance for an hour.

U-473 torpedoed the American destroyer USS Donnell on 3 May 1944. The warship did not sink; the U-boat dived deep to evade other convoy escorts and sustained slight damage from their depth charges.

On 6 May U-473 was detected by units of Britain's 2nd Support Group, and subjected to a prolonged "hunt to exhaustion". The three sloops, HMS Starling, Wren and Wild Goose, expended some 345 depth charges over a period of 15 hours, finally forcing U-473 to surface. The U-boat attempted to flee on the surface, but was brought under heavy gunfire from the three warships. Her captain and members of her crew were killed, and the survivors abandoned ship. The deserted U-boat, still running at high speed, headed straight for Starling which was obliged to take evasive action. Continuous gunfire from the three ships caused the U-boat to sink stern-first, at position 49°29′N 21°22′W. Two explosions, possibly scuttling charges, finished the submarine off.

Twenty-three men went down with U-473; there were thirty survivors.

== Summary of raiding history ==
Date	Ship Name	Nationality	Tonnage (Note: Merchant ship tonnages are in gross register tons. Military vessels are listed by tons displacement.)	Fate
3 May 1944	USS Donnell	United States Navy	1,400	Heavily Damaged

== Bibliography ==
- Busch, Rainer; Röll, Hans-Joachim (1999). German U-boat commanders of World War II : a biographical dictionary. Translated by Brooks, Geoffrey. London, Annapolis, Md: Greenhill Books, Naval Institute Press. ISBN 1-55750-186-6.
- Busch, Rainer; Röll, Hans-Joachim (1999). Deutsche U-Boot-Verluste von September 1939 bis Mai 1945 [German U-boat losses from September 1939 to May 1945]. Der U-Boot-Krieg (in German). Vol. IV. Hamburg, Berlin, Bonn: Mittler. ISBN 3-8132-0514-2.
- Gröner, Erich; Jung, Dieter; Maass, Martin (1991). U-boats and Mine Warfare Vessels. German Warships 1815–1945. Vol. 2. Translated by Thomas, Keith; Magowan, Rachel. London: Conway Maritime Press. ISBN 0-85177-593-4.
- Kemp, Paul (1999). U-Boats Destroyed – German Submarine Losses in the World Wars. London: Arms & Armour. ISBN 1-85409-515-3.
