= HMS Woodpecker (U08) =

Sloop of the Royal Navy

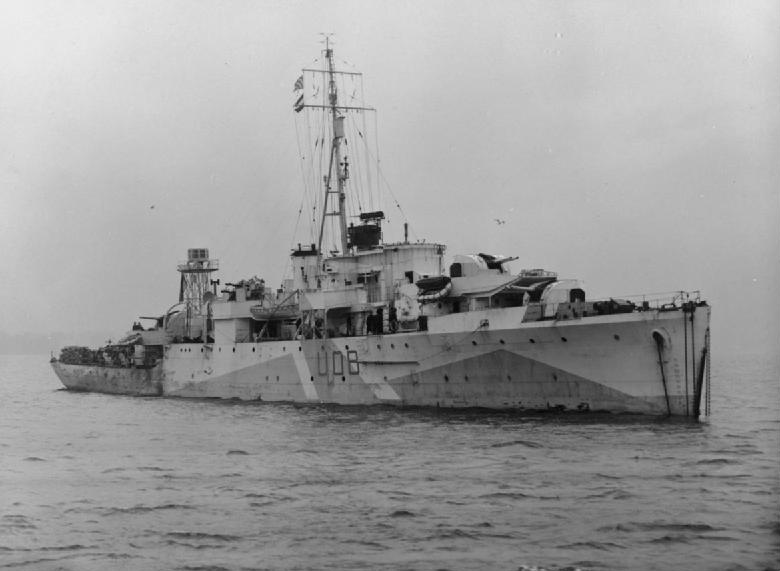
- Woodpecker in December 1942

History

United Kingdom
- Name: HMS Woodpecker
- Namesake: Woodpecker
- Builder: William Denny & Brothers
- Launched: 29 June 1942
- Commissioned: 14 December 1942
- Motto: Inveniet qui exquirit: 'He who seeks carefully shall find'
- Honours and awards: Biscay 1943; Atlantic 1943–44
- Fate: Sank while under tow 27 February 1944
- Badge: On a Field White, a woodpecker clinging to a stump of a tree proper

General characteristics
- Class & type: Black Swan-class sloop
- Displacement: 1,350 tons
- Length: 299 ft 6 in (91.29 m)
- Beam: 38 ft 6 in (11.73 m)
- Draught: 11 ft (3.4 m)
- Propulsion: Geared turbines, 2 shafts; 4,300 hp (3,200 kW)
- Speed: 20 knots (37 km/h)
- Range: 7,500 nmi (13,900 km) at 12 kn (22 km/h)
- Complement: 192
- Armament: 6 × 4-inch (102 mm) AA guns (3 × 2); 8 × 2-pdr AA pom-pom (2 x 4); 20 mm guns AA (2 × 2, 2 x 1)

Service record
- Part of: 2nd Support Group
- Commanders: Lt.Cdr RES Hugonin, Cdr HL Pryse.
- Operations: Battle of the Atlantic
- Victories: 6 U-boats (shared)

HMS Woodpecker, pennant number U08, was a Black Swan-class sloop of the Royal Navy. She was active during the Second World War and was a successful anti-submarine warfare vessel, being credited with the destruction of six U-boats.

== Construction ==
Woodpecker was ordered on 13 April 1940 under the 1940 Building Programme; she was laid down by William Denny & Brothers of Dumbarton, Scotland on 23 February 1941. She was launched on 29 June 1942, and commissioned 14 December the same year, with a build time of 23 months and 10 days. The Black Swan design was subject to many modifications during the building process, which were later consolidated into the Modified Black Swan design. Although Woodpecker was ordered under the original design, her late build meant she incorporated many of these modifications and is consequently listed in some sources as one of the Modified Black Swan class.

== Service history ==
After commissioning, Woodpecker was assigned to convoy escort duty. In April, Woodpecker joined 2nd Support Group, a highly successful anti-submarine warfare group under the command of FJ Walker.

In February Woodpecker, and 2 SG, were on support duty in the Atlantic, though they saw little action.

In June they were assigned to the Bay of Biscay, supporting Coastal Command's Operation Musketry. On 24 June Woodpecker, with others, found and destroyed two U-boats, U-119 and U-449, off Cape Ortegal.

On 30 July the group engaged three U-boats, already under air attack; all three were destroyed, with Woodpecker sharing credit for U-504.

Following the end of Musketry Woodpecker was docked for an extensive refit, remaining there until the end of the year.

In January 1944 Woodpecker, under the command of Commander H. L. Pryse, RNR, rejoined 2SG, which was on support duty in the South-Western Approaches. In February Woodpecker took part in the famous "Six in one trip" episode, during which she was credited with sharing the destruction of three U-boats. On 8 February, while supporting convoy SL 147/MKS 38, 2SG destroyed three U-boats; Woodpecker and Wild Goose were credited with the destruction of U-762. Three days later Woodpecker and others caught and destroyed U-424. On 19 February, while supporting ON 224, Woodpecker and others destroyed U-264 after a seven-hour hunt.

The following day, on 20 February 1944, Woodpecker was struck in the stern by an acoustic torpedo launched from the U-256. While being towed toward home, on 27 February 1944 Woodpecker foundered and sank in an Atlantic storm. The skeleton crew was rescued before the ship went under.

Woodpecker was the only ship belonging to 2SG to be sunk. She had shared in six of the groups 23 victories.

== Battle honours ==
During her service Woodpecker was awarded two battle honours:

- Biscay 1943
- Atlantic 1943–44

== Successes ==
During her service Woodpecker participated in the sinking of six U-boats:

Date	U-boat	Type	Location	Notes
24 June 1943	U-119	XB	Bay of Biscay, NW of Cape Ortegal; 44°59′N 12°24′W	depth-charge, ramming by Starling, Woodpecker
24 June 1943	U-449	VIIC	NW of Cape Ortegal; 45°00′N 11°59′W	d/c attacks by Wren, Woodpecker, Kite, Wild Goose
30 July 1943	U-504	IXC	NW of Cape Ortegal; 45°33′N 10°56′W	d/c attacks by Woodpecker, Wild Goose
8 February 1944	U-762	VIIC	North Atlantic, W of Cape Clear; 49°02′N 16°58′W	d/c attacks by Woodpecker, Wild Goose
11 February 1944	U-424	VIIC	N Atlantic, SW of Ireland; 50°00′N 18°14′W	d/c attacks byWild Goose, Woodpecker, Magpie
19 February 1944	U-264	VIIC	North Atlantic; 48°31′N 22°05′W	d/c, ramming by Starling, Wild Goose, Woodpecker

== Publications ==
- Colledge, J. J.; Warlow, Ben (2006) [1969]. Ships of the Royal Navy: The Complete Record of All Fighting Ships of the Royal Navy from the 15th Century to the Present (3rd Rev ed.). London: Chatham Publishing. ISBN 978-1-86176-281-8. OCLC 67375475.
- Hague, Arnold (1993). Sloops: A History of the 71 Sloops Built in Britain and Australia for the British, Australian and Indian Navies 1926–1946. Kendal, England: World Ship Society. ISBN 0-905617-67-3.
