= German submarine U-592 =

German World War II submarine

History

Nazi Germany
- Name: U-592
- Ordered: 16 January 1940
- Builder: Blohm & Voss, Hamburg
- Yard number: 568
- Laid down: 30 October 1940
- Launched: 20 August 1941
- Commissioned: 16 October 1941
- Fate: Sunk on 31 January 1944

General characteristics
- Class & type: Type VIIC submarine
- Displacement: 769 tonnes (757 long tons) surfaced; 871 t (857 long tons) submerged
- Length: 67.10 m (220 ft 2 in) o/a; 50.50 m (165 ft 8 in) pressure hull
- Beam: 6.20 m (20 ft 4 in) o/a; 4.70 m (15 ft 5 in) pressure hull
- Height: 9.60 m (31 ft 6 in)
- Draught: 4.74 m (15 ft 7 in)
- Installed power: 2,800–3,200 PS (2,100–2,400 kW; 2,800–3,200 bhp) (diesels); 750 PS (550 kW; 740 shp) (electric)
- Propulsion: 2 shafts; 2 × diesel engines; 2 × electric motors
- Speed: 17.7 knots (32.8 km/h; 20.4 mph) surfaced; 7.6 knots (14.1 km/h; 8.7 mph) submerged
- Range: 8,500 nmi (15,700 km; 9,800 mi) at 10 knots (19 km/h; 12 mph) surfaced; 80 nmi (150 km; 92 mi) at 4 knots (7.4 km/h; 4.6 mph) submerged
- Test depth: 230 m (750 ft); Crush depth: 250–295 m (820–968 ft)
- Complement: 4 officers, 40–56 enlisted
- Armament: 5 × 53.3 cm (21 in) torpedo tubes (four bow, one stern); 14 × torpedoes or 26 TMA mines; 1 × 8.8 cm (3.46 in) deck gun (220 rounds); 1 x 2 cm (0.79 in) C/30 AA gun

Service record
- Part of: 6th U-boat Flotilla; 16 October 1941 – 30 June 1942; 11th U-boat Flotilla; 1 July – 28 February 1943; 6th U-boat Flotilla; 1 March 1943 – 31 January 1944
- Identification codes: M 37 556
- Commanders: Kptlt. Carl Borm; 16 October 1941 – 24 July 1943; Oblt.z.S. Heinz Jaschke; 2 September 1943 – 31 January 1944
- Operations: 10 patrols: 1st patrol: 3 – 23 March 1942; 2nd patrol: a. 1 – 23 April 1942; b. 20 – 23 May 1942; c. 5 July 1942; d. 11 – 14 July 1942; 3rd patrol: 17 July – 14 August 1942; 4th patrol: 10 – 28 September 1942; 5th patrol: 7 – 19 October 1942; 6th patrol: a. 9 November – 15 December 1942; b. 16 – 18 December 1942; 7th patrol: 9 March – 18 April 1943; 8th patrol: 29 May – 14 July 1943; 9th patrol: 25 September – 25 November 1943; 10th patrol: 10 – 31 January 1944
- Victories: 1 merchant ship sunk (3,770 GRT)

German submarine U-592 was a Type VIIC U-boat of Nazi Germany's Kriegsmarine during World War II.

She carried out ten patrols, was a member of 16 wolfpacks and sank one ship of 3,770 gross register tons (GRT).

The boat was sunk by depth charges from British warships on 31 January 1944.

== Design ==
German Type VIIC submarines were preceded by the shorter Type VIIB submarines. U-592 had a displacement of 769 tonnes (757 long tons) when at the surface and 871 tonnes (857 long tons) while submerged. She had a total length of 67.10 m (220 ft 2 in), a pressure hull length of 50.50 m (165 ft 8 in), a beam of 6.20 m (20 ft 4 in), a height of 9.60 m (31 ft 6 in), and a draught of 4.74 m (15 ft 7 in). The submarine was powered by two Germaniawerft F46 four-stroke, six-cylinder supercharged diesel engines producing a total of 2,800 to 3,200 metric horsepower (2,060 to 2,350 kW; 2,760 to 3,160 shp) for use while surfaced, two Brown, Boveri & Cie GG UB 720/8 double-acting electric motors producing a total of 750 metric horsepower (550 kW; 740 shp) for use while submerged. She had two shafts and two 1.23 m (4 ft) propellers. The boat was capable of operating at depths of up to 230 metres (750 ft).

The submarine had a maximum surface speed of 17.7 knots (32.8 km/h; 20.4 mph) and a maximum submerged speed of 7.6 knots (14.1 km/h; 8.7 mph). When submerged, the boat could operate for 80 nautical miles (150 km; 92 mi) at 4 knots (7.4 km/h; 4.6 mph); when surfaced, she could travel 8,500 nautical miles (15,700 km; 9,800 mi) at 10 knots (19 km/h; 12 mph). U-592 was fitted with five 53.3 cm (21 in) torpedo tubes (four fitted at the bow and one at the stern), fourteen torpedoes, one 8.8 cm (3.46 in) SK C/35 naval gun, 220 rounds, and a 2 cm (0.79 in) C/30 anti-aircraft gun. The boat had a complement of between forty-four and sixty.

== Service history ==
The submarine was laid down on 30 October 1940 at Blohm & Voss, Hamburg as yard number 568, launched on 20 August 1941 and commissioned on 16 October under the command of Kapitänleutnant Carl Borm.

She served with the 6th U-boat Flotilla from 16 October 1941 for training and stayed with that organization for operations from 1 February 1942. She was reassigned to the 11th flotilla on 1 July, then back to the sixth flotilla from 1 March 1943.

=== First and second patrols ===
U-592's first patrol was preceded by a short trip from Hamburg to the German-controlled island of Helgoland, (also known as Heligoland), in February 1942. The patrol itself commenced on 3 March. She steamed up the Norwegian side of the North Sea and arrived at Bergen on 23 March.

For her second foray, she covered the Norwegian and Barents Seas.

=== Third patrol ===
Her third sortie was preceded by brief voyages from Bergen to Hamburg, then Kiel and back to Bergen. The patrol itself commenced with the boat's departure from the Norwegian port on 17 July 1942. She covered vast swathes of the Norwegian Sea before putting into Skjomenfjord, (south of Narvik), on 14 August.

=== Fourth patrol ===
U-592 covered the areas toward Spitsbergen (Svalbard) and Iceland.

=== Fifth patrol ===
The boat left Skjomenfjord on 7 October 1942. On the 14th, she scored her only success when she sank the Soviet ship Shchors with a mine off the western entrance to the Yugar Strait. This ship was being towed toward Belushja Bay when she sank in 11 m (36 ft) of water.

=== Sixth patrol ===
This patrol, in November and December 1942, was relatively uneventful. The boat moved from Narvik to Bergen in mid-December.

=== Seventh patrol ===
U-592 left Bergen on 9 March 1943, bound for the French Atlantic coast. Moving through the gap between Iceland and the Faroe Islands, she entered the Atlantic Ocean and patrolled southeast of Greenland before entering St. Nazaire on 18 April.

=== Eight and ninth patrols ===
These two sorties were also fairly trouble-free; between May and November 1943.

=== Tenth patrol and loss ===
The submarine had left St. Nazaire on 10 January 1944. On the 31st, she was sunk by depth charges, in position 50°20′N 17°29′W, from ships of the 2nd Support Group – HMS Starling, Wild Goose and Magpie, southwest of Ireland.

Forty-nine men died with U-592; there were no survivors.

=== Wolfpacks ===
U-592 took part in 16 wolfpacks, namely:

- Wrangel (11 – 18 March 1942)
- Naseweis (10 April 1942)
- Bums (10 – 14 April 1942)
- Blutrausch (15 – 19 April 1942)
- Nebelkönig (27 July – 13 August 1942)
- Trägertod (19 – 22 September 1942)
- Boreas (19 November – 9 December 1942)
- Seeteufel (21 – 30 March 1943)
- Löwenherz (1 – 10 April 1943)
- Siegfried (22 – 27 October 1943)
- Siegfried 2 (27 – 30 October 1943)
- Jahn (31 October – 2 November 1943)
- Tirpitz 4 (2 – 8 November 1943)
- Eisenhart 8 (9 – 10 November 1943)
- Rügen (21 – 26 January 1944)
- Hinein (26 – 29 January 1944)

== Summary of raiding history ==
Date	Ship Name	Nationality	Tonnage (GRT)	Fate
14 October 1942	Shchors	Soviet Union	3,770	Sunk (mine)

== Bibliography ==
- Busch, Rainer; Röll, Hans-Joachim (1999). German U-boat commanders of World War II : a biographical dictionary. Translated by Brooks, Geoffrey. London, Annapolis, Md: Greenhill Books, Naval Institute Press. ISBN 1-55750-186-6.
- Busch, Rainer; Röll, Hans-Joachim (1999). Der U-Boot-Krieg, 1939-1945: Deutsche U-Boot-Verluste von September 1939 bis Mai 1945 [German U-boat losses from September 1939 to May 1945] (in German). Vol. IV. Hamburg, Berlin, Bonn: Mittler. ISBN 3-8132-0514-2.
- Gröner, Eric; Jung, Dieter; Maass, Martin (1991). German Warships 1815-1945: U-boats and Mine Warfare Vessels. Vol. 2. Translated by Thomas, Keith; Magowan, Rachel. London: Conway Maritime Press. ISBN 0-85177-593-4.
- Kemp, Paul (1997). U-Boats Destroyed – German Submarine Losses in the World Wars. Arms & Armour. ISBN 1-85409-515-3.
