= Convoy JW 58 =

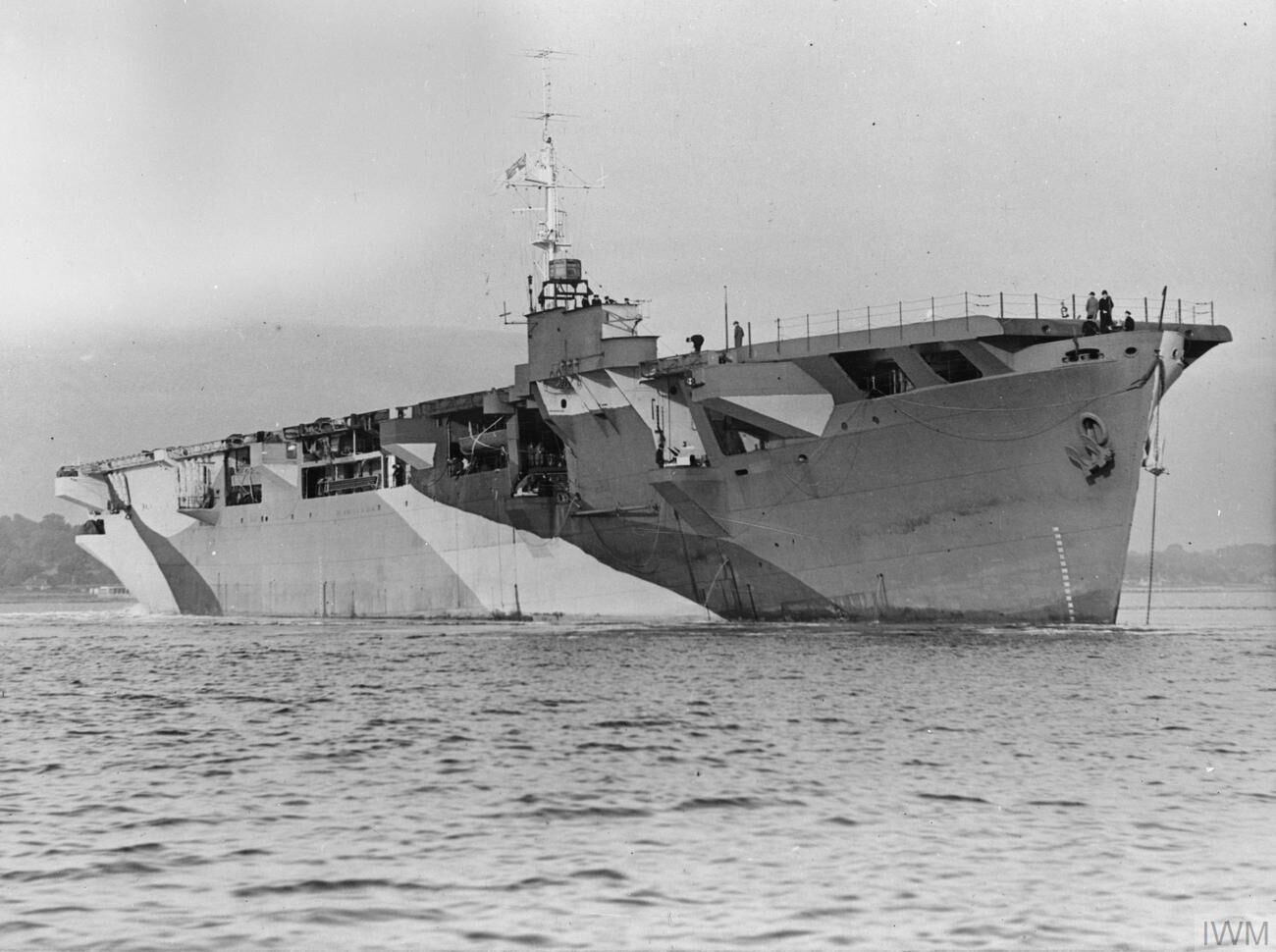
HMS Activity

Convoy JW 58 (27 March − 4 April 1944) was an Arctic convoy sent from Britain by the Western Allies to aid the Soviet Union during World War II. The convoy reached the Soviet northern ports intact. The convoy was attacked by German U-boats and aircraft but suffered no loss. Three U-boats were destroyed and six aircraft were shot down during these operations.

== Ships ==
The convoy consisted of 47 merchant ships which departed from Loch Ewe on 27 March 1944. It also included the US cruiser USS Milwaukee, which was being transferred to the Soviet navy as part of an agreement over the disposal of the surrendered Italian fleet. The convoy was joined from Iceland by three more ships en route from North America. Close escort was provided by a force led by Lieutenant Commander Hedworth Lambton in the destroyer HMS Westcott. The force comprised two other destroyers and three corvettes. The force was supported by the escort carriers, HMS Activity and HMS Tracker, that travelled with the convoy, and an "Ocean escort" of 17 fleet destroyers led by Rear-Admiral Frederick Dalrymple-Hamilton in the cruiser HMS Diadem. JW 58 was joined by the 2nd Support Group (2 SG) the navy's most successful anti-submarine warfare group, consisting of five sloops led by Capt. Frederick Walker, in HMS Starling. The convoy was accompanied initially by local escort groups from Britain and Iceland, joined later by a local escort group from Murmansk. Distant cover was provided by ships of the Home Fleet which were engaged in Operation Tungsten, an air attack against the German battleship Tirpitz anchored in Alta Fjord. These were the battleships HMS Duke of York and HMS Anson, the carrier HMS Victorious, cruiser HMS Belfast and six destroyers under the command of Vice-Admiral Bruce Fraser.

Ranged against this force were the U-boats of the German Arctic flotilla, 16 boats forming gruppe Blitz, gruppe Hammer and gruppe Thor. German surface forces and air forces were much diminished at this stage of the conflict; Tirpitz was still not operational after Operation Source when British X-Craft damaged the ship and the Luftwaffe was reduced to scouting and shadowing operations.

== Action ==
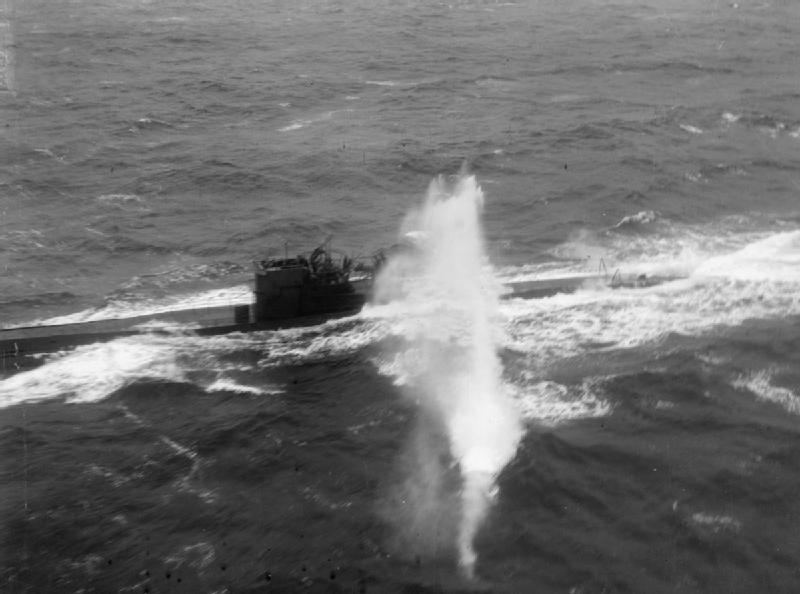
An Avenger machine gun attack on U-288 on 3 April

JW 58 departed Loch Ewe on 27 March 1944, accompanied by its local escort, the minesweeper Rattlesnake and two others, with two corvettes; On 29 March it met the Iceland contingent with its escort, the frigate Fitzroy and two A/S minesweepers. These were relieved by the Close escort and Ocean escort forces, and returned to base. On 29 March, Starling encountered U-961 in the Norwegian Sea. The U-boat was not part of the Arctic flotilla patrol lines but on passage to North Atlantic; she was unfortunate enough to encounter the RN force, was depth-charged and destroyed by Starling and Magpie of the 2nd SG.

On 31 March JW 58 met first patrol line and for 48 hours the U-boat force mounted 18 attacks on the convoy. No ships were hit but three U-boats were destroyed. U-355 was destroyed by HMS Beagle and aircraft from Tracker. (Note: Neistle however believes this attack hit U-673, which was damaged and forced to return, while U-355 was lost, cause unknown.) On 2 April, HMS Keppel destroyed U-360 with a hedgehog attack. On 3 April a Swordfish from Activity attacked U-288 and with help from a Martlet and Avenger team from Tracker, destroyed her. On 3 April also JW 58 was joined by the eastern local escort, four Soviet destroyers, and on 4 April arrived at Kola without further incident.

== Conclusion ==
With the safe arrival of so many ships and the destruction of three U-boats, plus a fourth incidental kill and six shadowing aircraft, JW 58 was one of the most successful Arctic convoys run by the Allies during World War II. JW 58 was the last Arctic convoy for several months. The sequence was discontinued during summer 1944 as all naval forces were required for Operation Neptune, the cover for the Normandy landings. It re-commenced in August 1944 with Convoy JW 59. Decorations to those taking part in JW 58 were announced on 18 July 1944.
