= German submarine U-385 =

German world war II submarine

History

Nazi Germany
- Name: U-385
- Ordered: 15 August 1940
- Builder: Howaldtswerke, Kiel
- Yard number: 16
- Laid down: 16 May 1941
- Launched: 8 July 1942
- Commissioned: 29 August 1942
- Fate: Sunk on 11 August 1944

General characteristics
- Class & type: Type VIIC submarine
- Displacement: 769 tonnes (757 long tons) surfaced; 871 t (857 long tons) submerged
- Length: 67.10 m (220 ft 2 in) o/a; 50.50 m (165 ft 8 in) pressure hull
- Beam: 6.20 m (20 ft 4 in) o/a; 4.70 m (15 ft 5 in) pressure hull
- Height: 9.60 m (31 ft 6 in)
- Draught: 4.74 m (15 ft 7 in)
- Installed power: 2,800–3,200 PS (2,100–2,400 kW; 2,800–3,200 bhp) (diesels); 750 PS (550 kW; 740 shp) (electric)
- Propulsion: 2 shafts; 2 × diesel engines; 2 × electric motors.
- Speed: 17.7 knots (32.8 km/h; 20.4 mph) surfaced; 7.6 knots (14.1 km/h; 8.7 mph) submerged
- Range: 8,500 nmi (15,700 km; 9,800 mi) at 10 knots (19 km/h; 12 mph) surfaced; 80 nmi (150 km; 92 mi) at 4 knots (7.4 km/h; 4.6 mph) submerged
- Test depth: 230 m (750 ft); Crush depth: 250–295 m (820–968 ft)
- Complement: 4 officers, 40–56 enlisted
- Armament: 5 × 53.3 cm (21 in) torpedo tubes (four bow, one stern); 14 × torpedoes; 1 × 8.8 cm (3.46 in) deck gun (220 rounds); 2 × twin 2 cm (0.79 in) C/30 anti-aircraft guns

Service record
- Part of: 5th U-boat Flotilla; 29 August 1942 – 29 February 1944; 6th U-boat Flotilla; 1 March – 11 August 1944
- Identification codes: M 50 427
- Commanders: Kptlt. Hans-Guido Valenter; 29 August 1942 – 11 August 1944
- Operations: 2 patrols: 1st patrol: 4 April – 4 June 1944; 2nd patrol: 9 – 11 August 1944
- Victories: None

German submarine U-385 was a Type VIIC U-boat of Nazi Germany's Kriegsmarine during World War II.

She carried out two patrols. She did not sink or damage any ships.

She was sunk by a British warship and an Australian aircraft in the Bay of Biscay on 11 August 1944.

== Design ==
German Type VIIC submarines were preceded by the shorter Type VIIB submarines. U-385 had a displacement of 769 tonnes (757 long tons) when at the surface and 871 tonnes (857 long tons) while submerged. She had a total length of 67.10 m (220 ft 2 in), a pressure hull length of 50.50 m (165 ft 8 in), a beam of 6.20 m (20 ft 4 in), a height of 9.60 m (31 ft 6 in), and a draught of 4.74 m (15 ft 7 in). The submarine was powered by two Germaniawerft F46 four-stroke, six-cylinder supercharged diesel engines producing a total of 2,800 to 3,200 metric horsepower (2,060 to 2,350 kW; 2,760 to 3,160 shp) for use while surfaced, two Garbe, Lahmeyer & Co. RP 137/c double-acting electric motors producing a total of 750 metric horsepower (550 kW; 740 shp) for use while submerged. She had two shafts and two 1.23 m (4 ft) propellers. The boat was capable of operating at depths of up to 230 metres (750 ft).

The submarine had a maximum surface speed of 17.7 knots (32.8 km/h; 20.4 mph) and a maximum submerged speed of 7.6 knots (14.1 km/h; 8.7 mph). When submerged, the boat could operate for 80 nautical miles (150 km; 92 mi) at 4 knots (7.4 km/h; 4.6 mph); when surfaced, she could travel 8,500 nautical miles (15,700 km; 9,800 mi) at 10 knots (19 km/h; 12 mph). U-385 was fitted with five 53.3 cm (21 in) torpedo tubes (four fitted at the bow and one at the stern), fourteen torpedoes, one 8.8 cm (3.46 in) SK C/35 naval gun, 220 rounds, and two twin 2 cm (0.79 in) C/30 anti-aircraft guns. The boat had a complement of between forty-four and sixty.

== Service history ==
The submarine was laid down on 16 May 1941 at the Howaldtswerke yard at Kiel as yard number 16, launched on 8 July 1942 and commissioned on 29 August under the command of Kapitänleutnant Hans-Guido Valenter.

She served with the 5th U-boat Flotilla from 29 August 1942 and the 6th flotilla from 1 March 1944.

The boat was moved from Kiel to Marviken in March 1944.

=== First patrol ===
U-385's first patrol took her from Marviken to St. Nazaire, in occupied France via the gap between Iceland and the Faroe Islands.

=== Second patrol and loss ===
The boat left St. Nazaire on 9 August 1944. On the 11th, whilst still in the Bay of Biscay, she was sunk by depth charges dropped by an Australian Sunderland flying boat of No. 461 Squadron RAAF (captained by pilot officer Ivan Southall) and the British sloop HMS Starling captained by Cdr. NW Duck.

One man died in the U-boat; there were 42 survivors.

== Bibliography ==
- Busch, Rainer; Röll, Hans-Joachim (1999). German U-boat commanders of World War II : a biographical dictionary. Translated by Brooks, Geoffrey. London, Annapolis, Md: Greenhill Books, Naval Institute Press. ISBN 1-55750-186-6.
- Busch, Rainer; Röll, Hans-Joachim (1999). Deutsche U-Boot-Verluste von September 1939 bis Mai 1945 [German U-boat losses from September 1939 to May 1945]. Der U-Boot-Krieg (in German). Vol. IV. Hamburg, Berlin, Bonn: Mittler. ISBN 3-8132-0514-2.
- Gröner, Erich; Jung, Dieter; Maass, Martin (1991). U-boats and Mine Warfare Vessels. German Warships 1815–1945. Vol. 2. Translated by Thomas, Keith; Magowan, Rachel. London: Conway Maritime Press. ISBN 0-85177-593-4.
- Kemp, Paul (1999). U-Boats Destroyed – German Submarine Losses in the World Wars. London: Arms & Armour. ISBN 1-85409-515-3.
