= USS Donnell =

Buckley-class destroyer escort

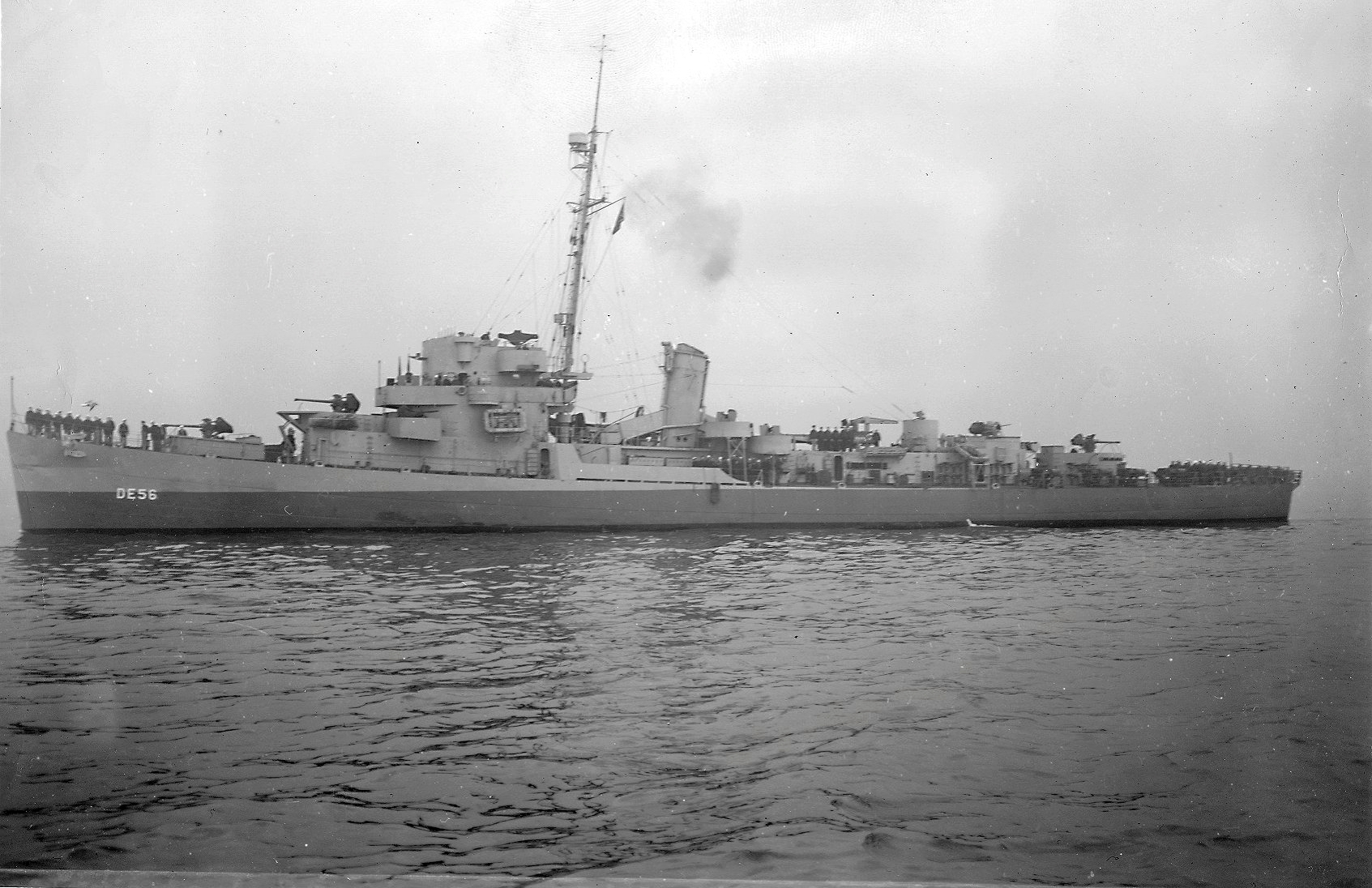
- Donnell on 20 November 1943

History

United States
- Name: USS Donnell
- Ordered: 1942
- Builder: Bethlehem Hingham Shipyard
- Laid down: 27 November 1942
- Launched: 13 March 1943
- Commissioned: 26 June 1943
- Decommissioned: 23 October 1945
- Reclassified: IX-182, 15 July 1944
- Stricken: 16 November 1945
- Honors and awards: 1 battle star (World War II)
- Fate: Sold for scrapping, 29 April 1946

General characteristics
- Class & type: Buckley-class destroyer escort
- Displacement: 1,400 long tons (1,422 t) light; 1,740 long tons (1,768 t) standard
- Length: 306 ft (93 m)
- Beam: 37 ft (11 m)
- Draft: 9 ft 6 in (2.90 m) standard; 11 ft 3 in (3.43 m) full load
- Propulsion: 2 × boilers; General Electric turbo-electric drive; 12,000 shp (8.9 MW); 2 × solid manganese-bronze 3,600 lb (1,600 kg) 3-bladed propellers, 8 ft 6 in (2.59 m) diameter, 7 ft 7 in (2.31 m) pitch; 2 × rudders; 359 tons fuel oil
- Speed: 23 knots (43 km/h; 26 mph)
- Range: 3,700 nmi (6,900 km) at 15 kn (28 km/h; 17 mph); 6,000 nmi (11,000 km) at 12 kn (22 km/h; 14 mph)
- Complement: 15 officers, 198 men
- Armament: 3 × 3"/50 caliber guns; 1 × quad 1.1"/75 caliber gun; 8 × single 20 mm guns; 1 × triple 21 inch (533 mm) torpedo tubes; 1 × Hedgehog anti-submarine mortar; 8 × K-gun depth charge projectors; 2 × depth charge tracks

USS Donnell (DE-56), a Buckley-class destroyer escort in service with the United States Navy from 1943 to 1945. She was scrapped in 1946.

== History ==
Donnell was named in honor of Ensign Earl Roe Donnell (1918–1942), who was killed in action while serving in Scouting Squadron 6 aboard the aircraft carrier Enterprise (CV-6) during an attack on the Marshall Islands on 6 February 1942. Donnell was laid down on 27 November 1942 at the Bethlehem Steel Company shipyard, at Hingham, Massachusetts, launched on 13 March 1943, sponsored by Mrs. E. R. Donnell, mother of Ensign Donnell, and commissioned on 26 June 1943.

=== Battle of the Atlantic ===
Donnell sailed from Boston on 31 August 1943 for trans-Atlantic convoy duty. She guarded the safe passage of four convoys to Derry and return in the buildup for the invasion of Europe in June. At sea bound for Derry again on her fifth voyage, on 3 May 1944 Donnell made a sound contact, then sighted a periscope a few minutes later and pressed home a depth charge attack on U-473. Simultaneously she was struck by a torpedo which blew off her stern. Explosion of her own depth charges inflicted additional damage on the escort. Her casualties were 29 killed and 25 wounded. Arriving after a 300-mile dash in response to a call from Donnell, an 18-hour hunt by the 2nd Support Group under Captain Frederic John Walker began which brought U-473 to the surface, where she was sunk by gunfire.

=== Operation Overlord ===
Donnell was towed by Reeves (DE-156), Hopping (DE-155), and HMS Samsonia to Dunstaffnage Bay, Scotland, arriving there on 12 May. Since repairs would have involved extensive reconstruction, she was placed in commission in reserve at Lisahally, Northern Ireland, on 20 June 1944, for use as an accommodation ship.

Electric power supplies were needed at newly captured ports on in France before the electric grid and electric power generating stations could be returned to service. Since Donnell had a large turbo-electric generator, but was not able to sail by herself because of the damage she had sustained, the ship was converted to an electric power barge and reclassified IX-182 on 15 July 1944. Donnell was towed to Plymouth, England, in July to embark passengers, take on cargo, and have electric power cables installed in place of her torpedo tubes. Donnell was towed in August to Cherbourg-Octeville, where she supplied electric power to shore installations. The experiment was such a success, that a few other destroyer escorts had their torpedo tubes removed and replaced by electric power cables and power supply equipment for use at other locations.

=== Decommissioning and fate ===
In February 1945 she was returned to England, and served as barracks ship at Portland and Plymouth until towed back to the United States, arriving at the Philadelphia Navy Yard on 18 July 1945. She was decommissioned on 23 October 1945, and sold for scrap on 29 April 1946.

== Gallery ==
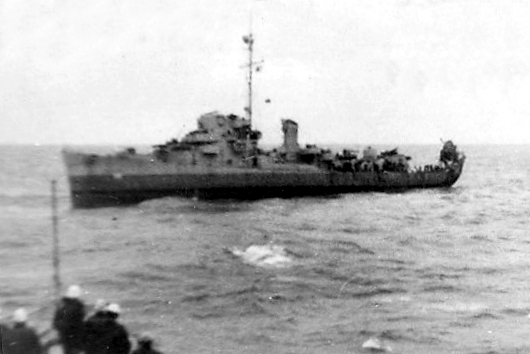
Donnell with her stern blown off, 4 May 1944

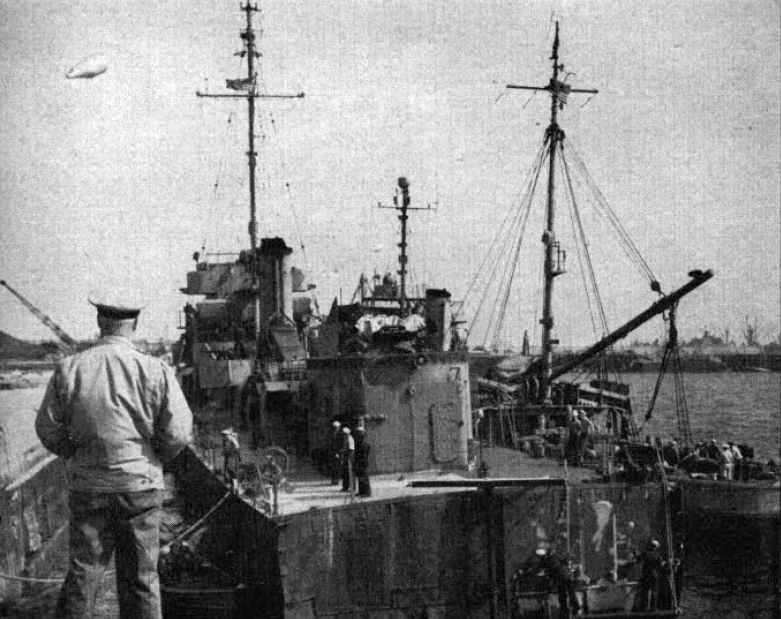
Donnell as a power barge at Cherbourg, France
