= German submarine U-264 =

German World War II submarine

History

Nazi Germany
- Name: U-264
- Ordered: 15 August 1940
- Builder: Bremer Vulkan-Vegesacker Werft, Bremen
- Yard number: 29
- Laid down: 21 June 1941
- Launched: 2 April 1942
- Commissioned: 22 May 1942
- Fate: Sunk, on 19 February 1944

General characteristics
- Class & type: Type VIIC submarine
- Displacement: 769 tonnes (757 long tons) surfaced; 871 t (857 long tons) submerged
- Length: 67.10 m (220 ft 2 in) o/a; 50.50 m (165 ft 8 in) pressure hull
- Beam: 6.20 m (20 ft 4 in) o/a; 4.70 m (15 ft 5 in) pressure hull
- Height: 9.60 m (31 ft 6 in)
- Draught: 4.74 m (15 ft 7 in)
- Installed power: 2,800–3,200 PS (2,100–2,400 kW; 2,800–3,200 bhp) (diesels); 750 PS (550 kW; 740 shp) (electric)
- Propulsion: 2 shafts; 2 × diesel engines; 2 × electric motors
- Speed: 17.7 knots (32.8 km/h; 20.4 mph) surfaced; 7.6 knots (14.1 km/h; 8.7 mph) submerged
- Range: 8,500 nmi (15,700 km; 9,800 mi) at 10 knots (19 km/h; 12 mph) surfaced; 80 nmi (150 km; 92 mi) at 4 knots (7.4 km/h; 4.6 mph) submerged
- Test depth: 230 m (750 ft); Crush depth: 250–295 m (820–968 ft)
- Complement: 4 officers, 40–56 enlisted
- Armament: 5 × 53.3 cm (21 in) torpedo tubes (four bow, one stern); 14 × torpedoes or 26 TMA mines; 1 × 8.8 cm (3.46 in) deck gun (220 rounds); 2 × 2 cm (0.79 in) C/30 anti-aircraft gun

Service record
- Part of: 8th U-boat Flotilla; 22 May – 31 October 1942; 6th U-boat Flotilla; 1 November 1942 – 19 February 1944
- Identification codes: M 02 981
- Commanders: Oblt.z.S. / Kptlt. Hartwig Looks; 22 May 1942 – 19 February 1944
- Operations: 5 patrols: 1st patrol: 3 November – 4 December 1942; 2nd patrol: 10 January – 5 March 1943; 3rd patrol: a. 8 April – 1 June 1943; b. 4 August 1943; c. 15 – 16 September 1943; 4th patrol: 22 September – 15 October 1943; 5th patrol: 5 – 19 February 1944
- Victories: 3 merchant ships sunk (16,843 GRT)

German submarine U-264 was a Type VIIC U-boat of Nazi Germany's Kriegsmarine during World War II. The submarine was laid down on 21 June 1941 at the Bremer-Vulkan-Vegesacker Werft (yard) in Bremen as yard number 29. She was launched on 2 April 1942 and commissioned on 22 May under the command of Oberleutnant zur See Hartwig Looks.

In five patrols, she sank three ships of 16,843 gross register tons (GRT).

She was sunk on 19 February 1944 by British warships but the entire crew survived and were taken prisoner.

== Design ==
German Type VIIC submarines were preceded by the shorter Type VIIB submarines. U-264 had a displacement of 769 tonnes (757 long tons) when at the surface and 871 tonnes (857 long tons) while submerged. She had a total length of 67.10 m (220 ft 2 in), a pressure hull length of 50.50 m (165 ft 8 in), a beam of 6.20 m (20 ft 4 in), a height of 9.60 m (31 ft 6 in), and a draught of 4.74 m (15 ft 7 in). The submarine was powered by two Germaniawerft F46 four-stroke, six-cylinder supercharged diesel engines producing a total of 2,800 to 3,200 metric horsepower (2,060 to 2,350 kW; 2,760 to 3,160 shp) for use while surfaced, two AEG GU 460/8–27 double-acting electric motors producing a total of 750 metric horsepower (550 kW; 740 shp) for use while submerged. She had two shafts and two 1.23 m (4 ft) propellers. The boat was capable of operating at depths of up to 230 metres (750 ft).

The submarine had a maximum surface speed of 17.7 knots (32.8 km/h; 20.4 mph) and a maximum submerged speed of 7.6 knots (14.1 km/h; 8.7 mph). When submerged, the boat could operate for 80 nautical miles (150 km; 92 mi) at 4 knots (7.4 km/h; 4.6 mph); when surfaced, she could travel 8,500 nautical miles (15,700 km; 9,800 mi) at 10 knots (19 km/h; 12 mph). U-264 was fitted with five 53.3 cm (21 in) torpedo tubes (four fitted at the bow and one at the stern), fourteen torpedoes, one 8.8 cm (3.46 in) SK C/35 naval gun, 220 rounds, and one 2 cm (0.79 in) C/30 anti-aircraft gun. The boat had a complement of between forty-four and sixty.

== Service history ==
After training with the 8th U-boat Flotilla, the boat became operational on 1 November 1942 when she was transferred to the 6th flotilla.

=== First and second patrols ===
U-264's first patrol began when she departed Kiel on 3 November 1942. She entered the Atlantic Ocean after negotiating the gap between the Faroe and the Shetland Islands. On 17 November, she sank the Mount Taurus. She was attacked by a Norwegian corvette, HNoMS Potentilla, on the 20th. No damage was sustained. She entered St. Nazaire in occupied France, on 4 December.

The boat's second sortie was relatively uneventful.

=== Third patrol ===
On 26 February 1943 just off Cape Finisterre she fired a salvo of four torpedoes at HMS Sussex but all four missed; Sussex had just attacked and sunk the German Tanker Hohenfriedburg. On 17 April 1943, she was in the process of attacking Convoy HX 233 when she was attacked by the escorts. The boat was badly damaged, but was repaired by the crew and the patrol continued. She then sank the Harperley and the West Maximus 500 nautical miles (930 km; 580 mi) south of Cape Farewell (Greenland) on 5 May. She docked at Lorient, on the French Atlantic coast, on 1 June.

There then followed a pair of short 'hops' between Lorient and St. Nazaire in August and September 1943.

=== Fourth patrol ===
While on her fourth patrol, U-264 and two other U-boats were re-fuelling from the supply submarine U-460 on 4 October 1943 when they were surprised by aircraft from the American carrier USS Card. The more nimble Type VIIs escaped, but the 'milch cow' was sunk by the Avengers. U-264 did not remain unscathed for long; later that day she was attacked, the damage inflicted forced a return to base.

=== Fifth patrol and loss ===
For her final sortie, she was again in the North Atlantic. She was damaged by depth charges dropped by the British sloops HMS Woodpecker and HMS Starling and forced to the surface on 19 February 1944 in position 48°31′N 22°05′W. Starling opened fire on the submarine, scoring several hits, as the crew abandoned the boat and it then sank.

The entire crew of 52 officers and men were taken prisoner.

=== Wolfpacks ===
U-264 took part in eleven wolfpacks, namely:

- Kreuzotter (15 – 20 November 1942)
- Delphin (23 January – 9 February 1943)
- Rochen (9 – 20 February 1943)
- Without name (15 – 18 April 1943)
- Specht (19 April – 4 May 1943)
- Fink (4 – 6 May 1943)
- Naab (12 – 15 May 1943)
- Donau 2 (15 – 19 May 1943)
- Mosel (19 – 23 May 1943)
- Igel 2 (15 – 17 February 1944)
- Hai 1 (17 – 19 February 1944)

== Summary of raiding history ==
Date	Ship Name	Nationality	Tonnage (GRT)	Fate
17 November 1942	Mount Taurus	Greece	6,696	Sunk
5 May 1943	Harperley	United Kingdom	4,586	Sunk
5 May 1943	West Maximus	United States	5,561	Sunk

== TV appearance ==
The captain of U-264, Captain Hartwig Looks, appears in the 1977 BBC television series The Secret War episode 7; "The Battle of the Atlantic".

Looks appears in the 1973 BBC television series The World at War episode 10; "WOLF PACK U-Boats in the Atlantic 1939-1944".

== Bibliography ==
- Busch, Rainer; Röll, Hans-Joachim (1999). German U-boat commanders of World War II : a biographical dictionary. Translated by Brooks, Geoffrey. London, Annapolis, Md: Greenhill Books, Naval Institute Press. ISBN 1-55750-186-6.
- Busch, Rainer; Röll, Hans-Joachim (1999). Der U-Boot-Krieg, 1939-1945: Deutsche U-Boot-Verluste von September 1939 bis Mai 1945 [German U-boat losses from September 1939 to May 1945] (in German). Vol. IV. Hamburg, Berlin, Bonn: Mittler. ISBN 3-8132-0514-2.
- Edwards, Bernard (1996). Dönitz and the Wolf Packs – The U-boats at War. Cassell Military Classics. p. 198. ISBN 0-304-35203-9.
- Gröner, Erich; Jung, Dieter; Maass, Martin (1991). U-boats and Mine Warfare Vessels. German Warships 1815–1945. Vol. 2. Translated by Thomas, Keith; Magowan, Rachel. London: Conway Maritime Press. ISBN 0-85177-593-4.
