= German submarine U-736 =

German World War II submarine

History

Nazi Germany
- Name: U-736
- Ordered: 10 April 1941
- Builder: Schichau-Werke, Danzig
- Yard number: 1533
- Laid down: 29 November 1941
- Launched: 31 October 1942
- Commissioned: 16 January 1943
- Fate: Sunk on 6 August 1944

General characteristics
- Class & type: Type VIIC submarine
- Displacement: 769 tonnes (757 long tons) surfaced; 871 t (857 long tons) submerged
- Length: 67.10 m (220 ft 2 in) o/a; 50.50 m (165 ft 8 in) pressure hull
- Beam: 6.20 m (20 ft 4 in) o/a; 4.70 m (15 ft 5 in) pressure hull
- Height: 9.60 m (31 ft 6 in)
- Draught: 4.74 m (15 ft 7 in)
- Installed power: 2,800–3,200 PS (2,100–2,400 kW; 2,800–3,200 bhp) (diesels); 750 PS (550 kW; 740 shp) (electric)
- Propulsion: 2 shafts; 2 × diesel engines; 2 × electric motors
- Speed: 17.7 knots (32.8 km/h; 20.4 mph) surfaced; 7.6 knots (14.1 km/h; 8.7 mph) submerged
- Range: 8,500 nmi (15,700 km; 9,800 mi) at 10 knots (19 km/h; 12 mph) surfaced; 80 nmi (150 km; 92 mi) at 4 knots (7.4 km/h; 4.6 mph) submerged
- Test depth: 230 m (750 ft); Crush depth: 250–295 m (820–968 ft)
- Complement: 4 officers, 40–56 enlisted
- Armament: 5 × 53.3 cm (21 in) torpedo tubes (four bow, one stern); 14 × torpedoes; 1 × 8.8 cm (3.46 in) deck gun (220 rounds); 1 × twin 2 cm (0.79 in) C/30 anti-aircraft gun

Service record
- Part of: 8th U-boat Flotilla; 16 January 1943 – 31 March 1944; 1st U-boat Flotilla; 1 April – 6 August 1944
- Identification codes: M 49 866
- Commanders: Oblt.z.S. Reinhard Reff; 16 January 1943 – 6 August 1944
- Operations: 2 patrols: 1st patrol: 31 March – 26 May 1944; 2nd patrol: 5 July – 6 August 1944
- Victories: None

German submarine U-736 was a Type VIIC U-boat of Nazi Germany's Kriegsmarine built for service during World War II. Her keel was laid down on 29 November 1941 by Schichau-Werke of Danzig. She was commissioned on 16 January 1943 with Oberleutnant zur See Reinhard Reff in command.

== Design ==
German Type VIIC submarines were preceded by the shorter Type VIIB submarines. U-736 had a displacement of 769 tonnes (757 long tons) when at the surface and 871 tonnes (857 long tons) while submerged. She had a total length of 67.10 m (220 ft 2 in), a pressure hull length of 50.50 m (165 ft 8 in), a beam of 6.20 m (20 ft 4 in), a height of 9.60 m (31 ft 6 in), and a draught of 4.74 m (15 ft 7 in). The submarine was powered by two Germaniawerft F46 four-stroke, six-cylinder supercharged diesel engines producing a total of 2,800 to 3,200 metric horsepower (2,060 to 2,350 kW; 2,760 to 3,160 shp) for use while surfaced, two AEG GU 460/8–27 double-acting electric motors producing a total of 750 metric horsepower (550 kW; 740 shp) for use while submerged. She had two shafts and two 1.23 m (4 ft) propellers. The boat was capable of operating at depths of up to 230 metres (750 ft).

The submarine had a maximum surface speed of 17.7 knots (32.8 km/h; 20.4 mph) and a maximum submerged speed of 7.6 knots (14.1 km/h; 8.7 mph). When submerged, the boat could operate for 80 nautical miles (150 km; 92 mi) at 4 knots (7.4 km/h; 4.6 mph); when surfaced, she could travel 8,500 nautical miles (15,700 km; 9,800 mi) at 10 knots (19 km/h; 12 mph). U-736 was fitted with five 53.3 cm (21 in) torpedo tubes (four fitted at the bow and one at the stern), fourteen torpedoes, one 8.8 cm (3.46 in) SK C/35 naval gun, 220 rounds, and one twin 2 cm (0.79 in) C/30 anti-aircraft gun. The boat had a complement of between forty-four and sixty.

== Service history ==
U-736 was severely damaged on 24 May 1944 by a Consolidated Liberator from No. 224 Squadron RAF, aircraft letter 'C', and then shot down a British Vickers Wellington aircraft.

== Fate ==
U-736 was sunk on 6 August 1944 in the Bay of Biscay west of St. Nazaire, in position 47°19′N 4°16′W, by Squid depth charges from HMS Loch Killin; there were 19 survivors and 28 dead.

The U-boat captain, Oberleutnant zur See Reinhard Reff, had fired a torpedo at HMS Loch Killin and the periscope was spotted by a port lookout. Action stations rang out through the ship and depth charges shot out in record time. The torpedo was destroyed by the explosion, which was so violent that it forced the damaged U-736 to surface under the stern of the frigate. For a few minutes both vessels were locked together and the survivors of the crew scrambled onto the quarterdeck of Loch Killin to the bewilderment of the frigate's crew. Then U-736 slipped away taking the other crew members to the bottom. The prisoners were disembarked to another warship returning to England and Loch Killin continued on patrol.

== Bibliography ==
- Busch, Rainer; Röll, Hans-Joachim (1999). German U-boat commanders of World War II : a biographical dictionary. Translated by Brooks, Geoffrey. London, Annapolis, Md: Greenhill Books, Naval Institute Press. ISBN 1-55750-186-6.
- Busch, Rainer; Röll, Hans-Joachim (1999). Der U-Boot-Krieg, 1939-1945: Deutsche U-Boot-Verluste von September 1939 bis Mai 1945 [German U-boat losses from September 1939 to May 1945] (in German). Vol. IV. Hamburg, Berlin, Bonn: Mittler. ISBN 3-8132-0514-2.
- Gröner, Eric; Jung, Dieter; Maass, Martin (1991). German Warships 1815-1945: U-boats and Mine Warfare Vessels. Vol. 2. Translated by Thomas, Keith; Magowan, Rachel. London: Conway Maritime Press. ISBN 0-85177-593-4.
