= German submarine U-226 =

German World War II submarine

Coordinates: 44°49′N 41°13′W

History

Nazi Germany
- Name: U-226
- Ordered: 15 August 1940
- Builder: Germaniawerft, Kiel
- Yard number: 656
- Laid down: 1 August 1941
- Launched: 18 June 1942
- Commissioned: 1 August 1942
- Fate: Sunk on 6 November 1943

General characteristics
- Class & type: Type VIIC submarine
- Displacement: 769 tonnes (757 long tons) surfaced; 871 t (857 long tons) submerged
- Length: 67.10 m (220 ft 2 in) o/a; 50.50 m (165 ft 8 in) pressure hull
- Beam: 6.20 m (20 ft 4 in) o/a; 4.70 m (15 ft 5 in) pressure hull
- Draught: 4.74 m (15 ft 7 in)
- Installed power: 2,800–3,200 PS (2,100–2,400 kW; 2,800–3,200 bhp) (diesels); 750 PS (550 kW; 740 shp) (electric)
- Propulsion: 2 shafts; 2 × diesel engines; 2 × electric motors
- Speed: 17.7 knots (32.8 km/h; 20.4 mph) surfaced; 7.6 knots (14.1 km/h; 8.7 mph) submerged
- Range: 8,500 nmi (15,700 km; 9,800 mi) at 10 knots (19 km/h; 12 mph) surfaced; 80 nmi (150 km; 92 mi) at 4 knots (7.4 km/h; 4.6 mph) submerged
- Test depth: 230 m (750 ft); Crush depth: 250–295 m (820–968 ft)
- Complement: 4 officers, 40–56 enlisted
- Armament: 5 × 53.3 cm (21 in) torpedo tubes (four bow, one stern); 14 × torpedoes or 26 TMA mines; 1 × 8.8 cm (3.46 in) deck gun; AA guns (2 cm FlaK 30)

Service record
- Part of: 5th U-boat Flotilla; 1 August – 31 December 1942; 6th U-boat Flotilla; 1 January – 6 November 1943
- Identification codes: M 12 559
- Commanders: Kptlt. Rolf Borchers; 1 August 1942 – 26 July 1943; Oblt.z.S. Albrecht Gänge; 26 July – 6 November 1943
- Operations: 3 patrols: 1st patrol: 31 December 1942 – 10 March 1943; 2nd patrol: a. 10 April – 17 May 1943; b. 28 – 30 September 1943; 3rd patrol: 5 October – 6 November 1943
- Victories: 1 merchant ship sunk (7,134 GRT)

German submarine U-226 was a Type VIIC U-boat that served with the Kriegsmarine during World War II. Laid down on 1 August 1941 as yard number 656 at F. Krupp Germaniawerft in Kiel, she was launched on 18 June 1942 and commissioned on 1 August under the command of Oberleutnant zur See Albrecht Gänge.

She began her service career in training with the 5th U-boat Flotilla. She was transferred to the 6th flotilla on 1 January 1943.

The boat was a member of eleven wolfpacks. She carried out three patrols and sank one ship.

She was sunk by British warships on 6 November 1943.

== Design ==
German Type VIIC submarines were preceded by the shorter Type VIIB submarines. U-226 had a displacement of 769 tonnes (757 long tons) when at the surface and 871 tonnes (857 long tons) while submerged. She had a total length of 67.10 m (220 ft 2 in), a pressure hull length of 50.50 m (165 ft 8 in), a beam of 6.20 m (20 ft 4 in), a height of 9.60 m (31 ft 6 in), and a draught of 4.74 m (15 ft 7 in). The submarine was powered by two Germaniawerft F46 four-stroke, six-cylinder supercharged diesel engines producing a total of 2,800 to 3,200 metric horsepower (2,060 to 2,350 kW; 2,760 to 3,160 shp) for use while surfaced, two AEG GU 460/8–27 double-acting electric motors producing a total of 750 metric horsepower (550 kW; 740 shp) for use while submerged. She had two shafts and two 1.23 m (4 ft) propellers. The boat was capable of operating at depths of up to 230 metres (750 ft).

The submarine had a maximum surface speed of 17.7 knots (32.8 km/h; 20.4 mph) and a maximum submerged speed of 7.6 knots (14.1 km/h; 8.7 mph). When submerged, the boat could operate for 80 nautical miles (150 km; 92 mi) at 4 knots (7.4 km/h; 4.6 mph); when surfaced, she could travel 8,500 nautical miles (15,700 km; 9,800 mi) at 10 knots (19 km/h; 12 mph). U-226 was fitted with five 53.3 cm (21 in) torpedo tubes (four fitted at the bow and one at the stern), fourteen torpedoes, one 8.8 cm (3.46 in) SK C/35 naval gun, 220 rounds, and an anti-aircraft gun. The boat had a complement of between forty-four and sixty.

== Service history ==
=== First patrol ===
U-226 departed Kiel on 31 December 1942, heading for the Atlantic Ocean via the gap between Iceland and the Faroe Islands. She sailed toward Newfoundland, southeast of Greenland. She arrived at Lorient in occupied France, on 17 May.

=== Second patrol ===
Having left Lorient on 10 April 1943, the boat encountered the Fort Rampart west of the Bay of Biscay on the 18th. The ship had already been attacked by U-628. U-226 finished the merchantman off with a 'coup de grǎce' torpedo and gunfire and returned to France; this time to St. Nazaire.

=== Third patrol ===
Having left St. Nazaire for Brest, the boat departed the port in Brittany on 5 October. U-226 was attacked and sunk on 6 November by depth charges from the British sloops HMS Starling, Woodcock and Kite east of Newfoundland. Fifty-one men died, there were no survivors.

=== Wolfpacks ===
U-226 took part in eleven wolfpacks, namely:

- Falke (8 – 12 January 1943)
- Habicht (10 – 19 January 1943)
- Haudegen (19 January – 15 February 1943)
- Sturmbock (24 – 26 February 1943)
- Without name (15 – 18 April 1943)
- Specht (19 April – 4 May 1943)
- Fink (4 – 5 May 1943)
- Siegfried (22 – 27 October 1943)
- Siegfried 3 (27 – 30 October 1943)
- Jahn (30 October – 2 November 1943)
- Tirpitz 4 (2 – 6 November 1943)

== Summary of raiding history ==
Date	Ship Name	Nationality	Tonnage (GRT)	Fate
18 April 1943	Fort Rampart	United Kingdom	7,134	Sunk

== Bibliography ==
- Bishop, Chris (2006). Kriegsmarine U-Boats, 1939–45. London: Amber Books. ISBN 978-1-904687-96-2.
- Busch, Rainer; Röll, Hans-Joachim (1999). German U-boat commanders of World War II : a biographical dictionary. Translated by Brooks, Geoffrey. London, Annapolis, Md: Greenhill Books, Naval Institute Press. ISBN 1-55750-186-6.
- Busch, Rainer; Röll, Hans-Joachim (1999). Deutsche U-Boot-Verluste von September 1939 bis Mai 1945 [German U-boat losses from September 1939 to May 1945]. Der U-Boot-Krieg (in German). Vol. IV. Hamburg, Berlin, Bonn: Mittler. ISBN 3-8132-0514-2.
- Gröner, Erich; Jung, Dieter; Maass, Martin (1991). U-boats and Mine Warfare Vessels. German Warships 1815–1945. Vol. 2. Translated by Thomas, Keith; Magowan, Rachel. London: Conway Maritime Press. ISBN 0-85177-593-4.
