= List of shipwrecks in July 1943 =

The list of shipwrecks in July 1943 includes ships sunk, foundered, grounded, or otherwise lost during July 1943.

== 1 July ==
List of shipwrecks: 1 July 1943
Ship	State	Description
Empire Ibex	United Kingdom	Convoy HX245: The Design 1079 ship (7,208 GRT) collided in the Atlantic Ocean (53°30′N 36°25′W) with Empire MacAlpine (United Kingdom) and was severely damaged. There were no casualties. She was abandoned the next day by her crew, who were rescued by Perth (United Kingdom). Empire Ibex sank on 3 July at 53°36′N 36°16′W.
Hokaze	Imperial Japanese Navy	World War II: The Minekaze-class destroyer was torpedoed and damaged in the bow by USS Thresher (United States Navy) in the Makassar Strait. She was beached at Makassar to prevent sinking, and was later repaired and returned to service.
Kronborg	Denmark	World War II: The passenger ship (118 GRT) was sunk by an explosion, probably due to a mine, 3 miles (4.8 km) off Mosede Havn, Denmark. One crew was killed.
Tutoya	Brazil	World War II: The cargo ship (1,125 GRT) was torpedoed and sunk in the South Atlantic 6 nautical miles (11 km) off Iguape by U-513 (Kriegsmarine) with the loss of seven of her 37 crew.

== 2 July ==
List of shipwrecks: 2 July 1943
Ship	State	Description
Banshu Maru No. 7	Japan	World War II: The cargo ship was torpedoed and sunk in the Pacific Ocean off the Kuril Islands by USS S-35 (United States Navy).
Bloody Marsh	United States	World War II: The T2 tanker was on her maiden voyage. She was torpedoed and sunk in the Atlantic Ocean (31°33′N 78°57′W) by U-66 (Kriegsmarine) with the loss of three of her 77 crew. Survivors were rescued by USS SC-1048 (United States Navy).
Canton Maru	Japan	World War II: The cargo ship was torpedoed and sunk off Formosa by USS Flying Fish (United States Navy) with the loss of 56 crewmen and 3 gunners.
Empire Kohinoor	United Kingdom	World War II: The cargo ship (5,225 GRT, 1919) was torpedoed and sunk in the Atlantic Ocean (6°20′N 16°30′W) by U-618 (Kriegsmarine) with the loss of six of her 87 crew. Survivors were rescued by Gascony (United Kingdom) and HMS Wolverine (Royal Navy) or reached land in their lifeboat.
Hoihow	United Kingdom	World War II: The passenger ship (2,798 GRT, 1933) was torpedoed and sunk in the Indian Ocean 103 nautical miles (191 km) north west of Mauritius (19°30′S 55°30′E) by U-181 (Kriegsmarine) with the loss of 145 of the 149 people aboard (the master, 90 crew members, seven gunners and 47 passengers). The four survivors, three crew members and one passenger, were rescued by Mormacswan (United States).
Isuzu Maru	Imperial Japanese Army	World War II: The Isuzu Maru-class transport was torpedoed and sunk in the Philippine Sea off Marinduque (13°45′N 121°50′E) by USS Trout (United States Navy). Four gunners and five crewmen were killed.
Kashi Maru	Imperial Japanese Navy	World War II: The net layer was bombed and sunk by American aircraft at Bairoko, Solomon Islands. One crew was killed.
USS PT-153	United States Navy	The Elco 80' PT boat ran aground and was abandoned off Munda Point, New Georgia, Solomon Islands.
USS PT-158	United States Navy	The Elco 80' PT boat ran aground and was abandoned off Munda Point.
Sisman	Turkey	World War II: The motorboat was shelled and sunk in the Aegean Sea off Charpay Island by HMS Trident (Royal Navy). One crew member was lost.
Yoneyama Maru	Imperial Japanese Army	World War II: The Somedono Maru-class transport was torpedoed and sunk in the Celebes Sea (01°30′N 119°30′E) north east of Cape Talok, Borneo by USS Thresher (United States Navy). Eight gunners and 44 crewmen were killed.

== 3 July ==
List of shipwrecks: 3 July 1943
Ship	State	Description
Anzan Maru	Japan	World War II: The cargo ship was torpedoed and sunk in the Yellow Sea (38°20′N 138°24′E) by USS Scorpion (United States Navy). Twenty passengers, a gunner and five crewmen were killed.
Elihu B. Washburne	United States	World War II: The Liberty ship (7,176 GRT) was torpedoed and sunk in the Atlantic Ocean off the coast of Brazil (24°05′S 45°23′W) by U-513 (Kriegsmarine). All 70 crew survived.
Kherzon	Soviet Union	The Liberty ship ran aground on the east coast of Kamchatka and broke in two on her delivery voyage to the Soviet Union. Both halves were refloated and later scrapped.
Kokuryu Maru	Japan	World War II: The cargo liner was torpedoed and sunk in the Yellow Sea (38°20′N 138°24′E) by USS Scorpion (United States Navy). Three crewmen and two gunners were killed.
HMS LST 429	Royal Navy	The MK 2-class landing ship tank burned and sank north of Zuwarah, Libya (33°05′N 11°52′E).
U-126	Kriegsmarine	World War II: The Type IXC submarine (1,540 GRT) was depth charged and sunk in the Atlantic Ocean north west of Cape Ortegal, Spain (46°02′N 11°23′W) by a Vickers Wellington aircraft of 172 Squadron, Royal Air Force with the loss of all 55 crew.
U-628	Kriegsmarine	World War II: The Type VIIC submarine (1,070 GRT) was depth charged and sunk in the Atlantic Ocean north west of Cape Ortegal, Spain (44°11′N 8°45′W) by a Consolidated B-24 Liberator aircraft of 224 Squadron, Royal Air Force with the loss of all 49 crew.

== 4 July ==
List of shipwrecks: 4 July 1943
Ship	State	Description
Breiviken	Norway	World War II: Convoy DN 50: The cargo ship (2,669 GRT, 1911) straggled behind the convoy. She was torpedoed and sunk in the Indian Ocean off Portuguese East Africa (21°50′S 37°50′E) by U-178 (Kriegsmarine) with the loss of three of her 36 crew.
Changri Lá	Brazil	World War II: The sailing ship was shelled and sunk in the South Atlantic off Arraial do Cabo by U-199 (Kriegsmarine) with the loss of all ten crew.
City of Venice	United Kingdom	World War II: Convoy KMS 18B: The troopship (8,762 GRT, 1924) was torpedoed and sunk in the Mediterranean Sea 10 nautical miles (19 km) north of Cape Ténès, Algeria (36°44′N 1°25′E) by U-409 (Kriegsmarine) with the loss of 22 of the 482 people aboard. Survivors were rescued by HMS Honeysuckle, HMS Restive, HMS Rhododendron and HMS Teviot (all Royal Navy). The landing craft HMS LCE-14 (Royal Navy), which was aboard City of Venice, was lost as well.
Koki Maru	Japan	World War II: Convoy No. 172: The cargo ship was torpedoed and sunk in the Pacific Ocean 20 nautical miles (37 km) north west of Naha, Okinawa (28°29′N 124°15′E) by USS Snook (United States Navy). 1 crewman was killed.
Liverpool Maru	Japan	World War II: Convoy No. 172: The Daifuku Maru No. 1-class transport was torpedoed and sunk in the Pacific Ocean 20 nautical miles (37 km) north west of Naha, Okinawa (28°29′N 124°15′E) by USS Snook (United States Navy). Three crewmen were killed.
Michael Livanos	Greece	World War II: The cargo ship (4,774 GRT, 1938) was torpedoed and sunk in the Mozambique Channel (22°52′S 36°47′E) by U-178 (Kriegsmarine) with the loss of two of her 41 crew.
Nikkyo Maru	Japan	World War II: The cargo ship was torpedoed and sunk in the Pacific Ocean off southeast coast of Honshu (34°33′N 138°37′E) by USS Jack (United States Navy). 17 crewmen were killed.
Pelotaslóide	Brazil	World War II: The cargo ship was torpedoed and sunk in the Atlantic Ocean off the coast of Brazil (0°24′S 47°36′W) by U-590 (Kriegsmarine). There were 5 dead and 37 survivors.
Sabbia	Italy	World War II: The cargo liner was torpedoed in the Mediterranean sea south of Capo Linaro by HNLMS Dolfijn (Royal Netherlands Navy). Sabbia was escorted by the German auxiliary submarine chaser UJ 2207 (Kriegsmarine) which also towed the damaged ship into Civitavecchia where she was beached, partly blocking the entrance. She was declared a constructive total loss.
St. Essylt	United Kingdom	World War II: Convoy KMS 18B: The cargo ship (5,634 GRT, 1940) was torpedoed and sunk in the Mediterranean Sea 10 nautical miles (19 km) north of Cape Tenez (36°44′N 1°31′E) by U-375 (Kriegsmarine) with the loss of four of the 401 people aboard. Survivors were rescued by HMS Honeysuckle, HMS Restive and HMS Rhododendron (all Royal Navy).
V 50 / Adalia	Regia Marina	World War II: The three-masted armed patrol schooner was sunk west of Civitavecchia by gunfire from HNLMS Dolfijn (Royal Netherlands Navy). The whole crew escaped in a lifeboat and reached the coast at Torre Chiaruccia the following morning.

== 5 July ==
List of shipwrecks: 5 July 1943
Ship	State	Description
Alcoa Prospector	United States	World War II: The cargo ship was torpedoed and damaged in the Gulf of Oman (24°21′N 59°04′E) by I-27 (Imperial Japanese Navy). There was no casualty. She was subsequently laid up at Karachi, and later at Bombay, India, and finally consequently scrapped in 1950.
Devis	United Kingdom	World War II: Convoy KMS 18B: The assault command ship (6,054 GRT, 1938) was torpedoed and sunk in the Mediterranean Sea north east of Cap Bengut, Algeria (37°01′N 4°10′E) by U-593 (Kriegsmarine) with the loss of 52 of the 343 people aboard. All dead were Canadian soldiers. Survivors were rescued by HMS Cleveland (Royal Navy). The landing craft HMS LCM-1123 (Royal Navy), which was aboard Devis, was lost as well.
M-106	Soviet Navy	World War II: The M-class submarine was depth charged and damaged by UJ 1206, UJ 1212, UJ 1214, and UJ 1217 (all Kriegsmarine). She was rammed and sunk by UJ 1217 after surfacing. All 23 crew were lost.
Maltran	United States	World War II: Convoy GTMO 134: The cargo ship (3,513 GRT) was torpedoed and sunk in the Caribbean Sea (18°11′N 74°57′W) by U-759 (Kriegsmarine). All 47 crew were rescued by SC-1279 (United States Navy).
USS Strong	United States Navy	World War II: The Fletcher-class destroyer was hit in Kula Gulf off New Georgia, Solomon Islands (8°05′S 157°15′E) by one of the torpedoes fired by Niizuki, Nagatsuki and Yunagi (all Imperial Japanese Navy), then shelled by shore batteries and sank with the loss of 46 of her 329 crew. Most of the survivors were rescued by USS Chevalier (United States Navy).
U-535	Kriegsmarine	World War II: The Type IXC submarine was depth charged and sunk in the Atlantic Ocean north east of Cape Finisterre, Spain (43°38′N 9°13′W) by Consolidated B-24 Liberator aircraft of 53 Squadron, Royal Air Force with the loss of all 55 crew.

== 6 July ==
List of shipwrecks: 6 July 1943
Ship	State	Description
Banshu Maru No.33	Japan	World War II: The coaster was torpedoed and sunk in the Sea of Japan west of Hokkaido (43°35′N 140°21′E) by USS Permit (United States Navy). Three crew were killed.
Erg	Canada	The harbour tug (28 GRT, 1915) was in a collision with Norelg (Norway) at Halifax, Nova Scotia and sank with the loss of all three crew and 16 of the 21 passengers nineteen lives. She was later refloated, but declared a constructive total loss and was scuttled on 24 August.
GM 53	Kriegsmarine	World War II: The guard ship struck a mine and sank in the Aegean Sea off Saloniki, Greece. Four crew were killed and four survived.
USS Helena	United States Navy	World War II: Battle of Kula Gulf: The St. Louis-class cruiser was torpedoed and sunk in the Pacific Ocean off Kolombangara, Solomon Islands (7°46′00″S 157°11′00″E) by Suzukaze and Tanikaze (both Imperial Japanese Navy) with the loss of 168 of her 888 crew.
Hydraios	Greece	World War II: The cargo ship (4,476 GRT, 1902) was torpedoed and sunk in the Indian Ocean (24°44′S 35°12′E) by U-198 (Kriegsmarine). All 40 crew survived.
Jasper Park	Canada	World War II: The Park ship (7,129 GRT, 1942) was torpedoed and sunk in the Indian Ocean (32°52′S 42°15′E) by U-177 (Kriegsmarine) with the loss of four of her 55 crew. Survivors were rescued by HMAS Quiberon and HMAS Quickmatch (both Royal Australian Navy).
Nagatsuki	Imperial Japanese Navy	Nagatsuki, May 1944 World War II: Battle of Kula Gulf: The Mutsuki-class destroyer was shelled and damaged in the Pacific Ocean off Kolombangara by United States Navy ships. She then ran aground near Bambari Harbour (7°57′S 157°12′E) but was bombed and destroyed the same day by American aircraft. She has by then by almost totally evacuated by crew and troops and there were only 8 killed and 13 injured.
Niizuki	Imperial Japanese Navy	World War II: Battle of Kula Gulf: The Akizuki-class destroyer was shelled and sunk in the Pacific Ocean approximately five miles (8.0 km) east of Tuki Point, Kolombangara (7°57′S 157°12′E) by United States Navy ships. Commander Kaneda, Admiral Akiyama and the entire Desron 3 staff, along with almost all hands are lost in action. Approximately 290 officers and men lost, only a few later being taken prisoner by the Americans or reaching land, an unknown number of survivors, probably few, were rescued by Amagiri (Imperial Japanese Navy). The wreck's was discovery announced on 17 April 2019.
Poelau Roebiah	Netherlands	World War II: Convoy TAG 70: The cargo liner (9,251 GRT, 1928) was torpedoed and sunk in the Caribbean Sea (17°56′N 75°57′W) by U-759 (Kriegsmarine) with the loss of two of the 123 people aboard. Survivors were rescued by USS PC-1253 (United States Navy).
Ritsa	Soviet Union	World War II: The auxiliary schooner (possibly spelled Riza) was sunk near Arkhipo-Osipouka by S 28, S 40, S 47, and S 51 (all Kriegsmarine). 6 people were killed.
S 59	Kriegsmarine	World War II: The Type 1939 E-boat was bombed and sunk by British aircraft at Porto Embedocle, Sicily, Italy.
Shahjehan	United Kingdom	World War II: Convoy MWS 36: The cargo ship (5,454 GRT, 1942) was torpedoed and damaged in the Mediterranean Sea 150 nautical miles (280 km) north west of Benghazi, Libya (33°01′N 21°32′E) by U-453 (Kriegsmarine) with the loss of one of the 328 people aboard. She was taken in tow but sank the next day at 32°55′N 21°10′E. Survivors were rescued by HMS Aphis and HMS St. Monance (both Royal Navy).
HNLMS TM 27	Royal Netherlands Navy	The TM 22-class motor torpedo boat was sunk at Curacao by an explosion.
Tripoli	Italy	World War II: The cargo ship was torpedoed and sunk in the Mediterranean Sea by HMS Saracen (Royal Navy). There were 34 people missing and 19 survivors.

== 7 July ==
List of shipwrecks: 7 July 1943
Ship	State	Description
F 144	Kriegsmarine	World War II: The Type A Marinefahrprahm was bombed in Yalta port by Soviet Douglas A-20 Havoc aircraft and was damaged beyond repair and beached, later towed to Varna and scrapped. There were no casualties.
James Robertson	United States	World War II: Convoy BT 18: The Liberty ship was torpedoed and sunk in the Atlantic Ocean off Brazil (4°05′S 35°38′W) by U-185 (Kriegsmarine) with the loss of one of her 69 crew. Survivors were rescued by Jaguarão (Brazilian Navy) and USS PC-575 (United States Navy) or reached land in their lifeboat.
Leana	United Kingdom	World War II: The cargo ship (4,742 GRT, 1914) was torpedoed and sunk in the Indian Ocean 40 nautical miles (74 km) east of Zavora Point, Portuguese East Africa (25°06′S 35°33′E) by U-198 (Kriegsmarine) with the loss of two of her 66 crew. Her captain was taken aboard U-198 as a prisoner of war. The rest of the survivors reached land in their lifeboats.
MAS 536	Regia Marina	World War II: The MAS 526-class MAS boat was sunk off Leros in a collision with Rubattino (Italy).
Showa Maru	Japan	World War II: The cargo ship was torpedoed and sunk in the Sea of Japan off Otaru, Hokkaido, Japan (43°14′N 139°53′E) by USS Permit (United States Navy). 24 crew were killed.
Thomas Sinnickson	United States	World War II: Convoy BT 18: The Liberty ship was torpedoed and damaged in the Atlantic Ocean off Fortaleza, Brazil (3°51′S 36°22′W) by U-185 (Kriegsmarine) with the loss of one of her 70 crew. Survivors were rescued by USS Surprise (United States Navy), which scuttled the ship by gunfire the next day.
U-951	Kriegsmarine	World War II: The Type VIIC submarine was depth charged and sunk in the Atlantic Ocean north west of Cape St. Vincent, Portugal (37°40′N 15°30′W) by a Consolidated B-24 Liberator aircraft of the United States Navy with the loss of all 46 crew.
Wilhelmsburg	Germany	World War II: The tanker was torpedoed and sunk in the Aegean Sea (39°55′N 25°50′E) by HMS Rorqual (Royal Navy). All 66 crewmen survived and were rescued by accompanying escort vessels.
William Boyce Thompson	United States	World War II: Convoy BT 18: The tanker was torpedoed and sunk in the Atlantic Ocean 175 nautical miles (324 km) off Fortaleza, Brazil, by U-185 (Kriegsmarine) with the loss of four of her 57 crew. Survivors were rescued by Jaguarão (Brazilian Navy) and USS Surprise (United States Navy).

== 8 July ==
List of shipwrecks: 8 July 1943
Ship	State	Description
B. P. Newton	Norway	World War II: Convoy TJ 1: The tanker (10,324 GRT, 1940) was torpedoed and sunk in the Atlantic Ocean (5°50′N 50°20′W) by U-510 (Kriegsmarine) with the loss of 23 of her 47 crew. Survivors were rescued by USS PC-495 (United States Navy).
Eldena	United States	World War II: Convoy TJ 1: The cargo ship was torpedoed and sunk in the Atlantic Ocean (5°50′N 50°20′W) by U-510 (Kriegsmarine). All 66 crew were rescued by USS PC-592 (United States Navy).
HMS LCT 547	Royal Navy	The Mk 4 landing craft tank (350/640 t, 1942) foundered off Malta.
S 102	Kriegsmarine	World War II: The Type 1939/40 E-boat was sunk by a mine in the Black Sea south of Kerch, Soviet Union. Eight crew were killed.
Sperrbrecher 165 Gebweiler	Kriegsmarine	World War II: The Sperrbrecher struck a mine and sank off Gothenburg, Sweden. 16 crew were lost
U-514	Kriegsmarine	World War II: The Type IXC submarine was depth charged and sunk by a Consolidated B-24 Liberator aircraft of 224 Squadron, Royal Air Force with the loss of all 54 crew.
Valfiorita	Italy	World War II: The cargo ship was torpedoed and sunk in the Mediterranean Sea by HMS Ultor (Royal Navy) with the loss of 13 crew.

== 9 July ==
List of shipwrecks: 9 July 1943
Ship	State	Description
De la Salle	United Kingdom	World War II: Convoy ST 71: The cargo ship (8,400 GRT, 1921) was torpedoed and sunk in the Gulf of Benin 60 nautical miles (110 km) south west of Lagos, Nigeria (5°50′N 2°22′E) by U-508 (Kriegsmarine) with the loss of ten of the 249 people aboard. Survivors were rescued by Commandant Detroyat (Free French Naval Forces).
Manchester Citizen	United Kingdom	World War II: Convoy ST 71: The cargo ship (5,343 GRT, 1925) was torpedoed and sunk in the Gulf of Benin 60 nautical miles (110 km) south west of Lagos (5°50′N 2°22′E) by U-508 (Kriegsmarine) with the loss of 29 of her 104 crew. Survivors were rescued by Commandant Detroyant (Free French Naval Forces).
PiLB 103	Kriegsmarine	World War II: The PiLB 39 Type personnel landing craft was bombed and sunk at Vibo Valentia, Italy.
Samuel Heintzelman	United States	World War II: The Liberty ship was torpedoed and sunk in the Indian Ocean (approximately 9°S 81°E) by U-511 (Kriegsmarine) with the loss of all 75 people aboard.
Seiner No.20	Soviet Union	World War II: The oceanographic vessel was shelled and sunk in the Sea of Japan about 27 nautical miles off Kaiba by USS Permit (United States Navy), which rescued all 12 survivors, but one died of wounds the same day. Another crew had been killed in the shelling.
U-232	Kriegsmarine	World War II: The Type VIIC submarine was depth charged and sunk in the Atlantic Ocean (39°48′N 14°22′W) by a Vickers Wellington aircraft of 179 Squadron, Royal Air Force with all 46 hands.
U-435	Kriegsmarine	World War II: The Type VIIC submarine was depth charged and sunk in the Atlantic Ocean west of Figueira, Portugal (39°20′N 13°00′W) by a Consolidated B-24 aircraft of 1st A/S Sqn, USAAF with the loss of all 48 crew.
U-590	Kriegsmarine	World War II: The Type VIIC submarine was depth charged and sunk in the Atlantic Ocean of the mouth of the Amazon River (3°22′N 48°38′W) by a Consolidated PBY Catalina aircraft of the United States Navy with the loss of all 45 crew.

== 10 July ==
List of shipwrecks: 10 July 1943
Ship	State	Description
Alice F. Palmer	United States	World War II: The Liberty ship was torpedoed, shelled and sunk in the Indian Ocean (26°30′S 44°20′E) by U-177 (Kriegsmarine). All 68 crew were rescued by a Consolidated PBY Catalina aircraft of the Royal Air Force or reached land in their lifeboats.
Cygnet	Panama	The cargo ship ran aground off Cape d'Or, Nova Scotia, Canada. She was refloated and beached at Port Greville in a leaky condition. Although declared a constructive total loss, she was repaired and returned to service.
Gulfprince	United States	World War II: Convoy LT 22: The tank ship tanker was torpedoed and heavily damaged in the Mediterranean Sea (37°13′N 5°12′E) by U-371 (Kriegsmarine) with the loss of one of her 63 crew. She was towed to Algiers, Algeria. Rather than declaring the vessel a total loss, the US War Shipping Administration bought her and chartered the tanker to the US Navy for use as a mobile storehouse in North Africa. She was laid up at Taranto, Italy in March 1945 and consequently sold for scrapping on 20 February 1948.
HMS LCT 154	Royal Navy	The Mk 2 landing craft tank (296/460 t, 1941) foundered off Bizerte, Algeria.
HMS LCT 311	Royal Navy	The Mk 3 landing craft tank (350/640 t, 1942) foundered off Bizerte while under tow.
USS LST-313	United States Navy	World War II: Battle of Gela: The Mk 1 landing craft tank was bombed, set on fire and sunk in the Mediterranean Sea (37°01′N 14°15′E) off Gela, Sicily, Italy. Between 21 and 27 men were killed depending on sources.
M 153	Kriegsmarine	World War II: The M-class minesweeper was shelled off Ouessant, Britanny, France by HNoMS Glaisdale (Royal Norwegian Navy) and sank the next day. 18 crew were killed.
M 4451 Gauleiter Alfred Meyer	Kriegsmarine	World War II: The auxiliary minesweeper was sunk by a mine off Arcachon, France. 12 crew were killed.
USS Maddox	United States Navy	World War II: Battle of Gela: The Gleaves-class destroyer was bombed and sunk in the Mediterranean Sea 16 nautical miles (30 km) off Gela Sicily, Italy by an Italian Royal Air Force Junkers Ju 87 Stuka dive bomber. 210 of her 284 crew were killed.
Oriole	Regia Marina	World War II: The M-1915-class minesweeper was bombed at Augusta, Sicily by British aircraft. She was subsequently scuttled.
Scandinavia	Sweden	World War II: The cargo ship was torpedoed and sunk in the Atlantic Ocean 200 nautical miles (370 km) north of Cayenne, French Guiana (8°21′N 48°30′W by U-510 (Kriegsmarine). All 25 crew survived. She was on a voyage from Philadelphia, Pennsylvania, United States to Montevideo, Uruguay.
USS Sentinel	United States Navy	World War II: Battle of Gela: The Auk-class minesweeper was bombed and sunk in the Mediterranean Sea off Licata, Sicily. 10 of the crew were killed and 51 wounded. Survivors were rescued by USS LCI-33, USS PC-550 and USS SC-530 (all United States Navy).
Talamba	India	World War II: Battle of Gela: The hospital ship (8,018 GRT, 1924) was bombed and sunk by Luftwaffe aircraft (36°55′N 15°14′E) with the loss of five of the 568 people on board.

== 11 July ==
List of shipwrecks: 11 July 1943
Ship	State	Description
Baarn	Netherlands	World War II: The cargo ship (5,621 GRT, 1927) was bombed and set on fire off Avola, Sicily, Italy (36°55′N 15°13′E) by German aircraft. She was scuttled by Allied ships. Her 72 crew survived.
HMS California	Royal Navy	World War II: Convoy Faith: The troopship (16,792 GRT, 1923) was bombed and set afire in the Atlantic Ocean west of Vigo, Spain by Focke-Wulf Fw 200 aircraft of Kampfgeschwader 40, Luftwaffe and was abandoned with the loss of 46 lives. Survivors were rescued by HMS Douglas, HMS Moyola (both Royal Navy) and HMCS Iroquois (Royal Canadian Navy). She was scuttled the next day by HMS Douglas.
Duchess of York	United Kingdom	World War II: Convoy Faith: The troopship (20,021 GRT, 1929) was bombed and set afire in the Atlantic Ocean west of Vigo by Focke-Wulf Fw 200 aircraft of Kampfgeschwader 40. Survivors were rescued by HMS Douglas, HMS Moyola (both Royal Navy) and HMCS Iroquois (Royal Canadian Navy) with the loss of 27 lives. She was scuttled the next day.
Flutto	Regia Marina	World War II: The Flutto-class submarine was sunk in the Straits of Messina (37°34′N 15°43′E) by HMMTB 640, HMMTB 651, and HMMTB 670 (all Royal Navy) with the loss of all 49 crew.
Fram III	Denmark	World War II: The fishing boat was sunk by a mine.
USS LST-158	United States Navy	World War II: The Mk. 1 landing ship tank was bombed, abandoned and sank in the Mediterranean Sea (37°05′N 13°55′E) off Licata, Sicily.
Mary Livanos	Greece	World War II: The cargo ship was torpedoed and sunk in the Mozambique Channel (15°40′S 40°45′E) by U-178 (Kriegsmarine) with the loss of eight of her 36 crew.
Robert Rowan	United States	World War II: The Liberty ship was bombed and sunk in the Mediterranean Sea off Gela, Sicily, Italy (36°47′N 14°30′E) by German bomber aircraft. All 421 crew and passengers left the ship before her ammunition cargo exploded and survived.
SG 13	Kriegsmarine	World War II: The escort vessel was torpedoed and damaged by Allied aircraft in the Mediterranean Sea and was beached. She was refloated on 23 July and taken to La Ciotat, Bouches-du-Rhône France.
Taiko Maru	Japan	World War II: Convoy O-404: The transport was torpedoed and sunk in the Philippine Sea (12°45′N 131°50′E) by USS Gurnard (United States Navy). Two gunners and ten crewmen killed.
Takatori Maru No. 8	Japan	World War II: The sailing vessel was sunk in the Pacific Ocean off Formosa by USS Flying Fish (United States Navy).
Tell	Germany	World War II: The cargo ship was torpedoed and sunk in the Mediterranean Sea by HMS Saracen (Royal Navy).

== 12 July ==
List of shipwrecks: 12 July 1943
Ship	State	Description
African Star	United States	World War II: The Type C2 cargo ship was torpedoed and sunk in the South Atlantic (25°46′S 40°45′W) by U-172 (Kriegsmarine) with the loss of one gunner. Survivors were rescued by Maranhao (Brazilian Navy.
Chikuzan Maru	Japan	World War II: The cargo ship was bombed and sunk in the Indian Ocean off Haiphong, French Indochina (20°52′N 106°41′E) by Consolidated B-24 Liberator aircraft of the American Fourteenth Air Force.
MS 62	Regia Marina	World War II: The MS 51-class MS boat was sunk at Milazzo by Allied aircraft.
Niitaka Maru	Japan	World War II: The cargo ship was torpedoed and sunk in the Pacific Ocean off the coast of Japan by USS Plunger (United States Navy).
Ocean Peace	United Kingdom	World War II: The Ocean ship (7,173 GRT, 1942) was bombed and sunk in the Mediterranean Sea off Avola, Sicily, Italy (36°55′N 15°13′E) by enemy aircraft.
Rahmani	United Kingdom	World War II: The passenger ship (5,463 GRT, 1928) was torpedoed and sunk in the Gulf of Aden (14°52′N 52°06′E) by I-29 (Imperial Japanese Navy) with the loss of twenty of the 306 people on board.
Ro-107	Imperial Japanese Navy	World War II: Battle of Kula Gulf: The Ro-100-class submarine was sunk off Kolombangara, Solomon Islands by USS Taylor (United States Navy). Lost with all 42 hands.
Tairyo Maru	Japan	World War II: The cargo ship was bombed and sunk in the Indian Ocean off Haiphon by Consolidated B-24 Liberator aircraft of the American Fourteenth Air Force.
U-409	Kriegsmarine	World War II: The Type VIIC submarine was depth charged and sunk in the Mediterranean Sea north of Algiers, Algeria (37°12′N 0°40′E) by HMS Inconstant (Royal Navy) with the loss of 11 of her 48 crew.
U-506	Kriegsmarine	World War II: The Type IXC submarine was depth charged and sunk in the Atlantic Ocean west of Vigo, Galicia, Spain (42°30′N 16°30′W) by a Consolidated B-24 Liberator aircraft of the United States Army Air Forces with the loss of 48 of her 54 crew.
U-561	Kriegsmarine	World War II: The Type VIIC submarine was torpedoed and sunk in the Straits of Messina by HMMTB 81 (Royal Navy) with the loss of 42 of her 47 crew.

== 13 July ==
List of shipwrecks: 13 July 1943
Ship	State	Description
Acciaio	Regia Marina	World War II: The Acciaio-class submarine was sunk off Calabria (38°30′N 15°49′E) by HMS Unruly (Royal Navy) and was lost with all 46 crew.
Cosenza	Italy	World War II: The steamer was sunk west off the Italian coast (39°58′N 14°18′E) by Allied aircraft. There were 11 dead and 40 survivors.
USS Gwin	United States Navy	World War II: Battle of Kolombangara: The Gleaves-class destroyer was scuttled in the Pacific Ocean off the Solomon Islands (7°41′S 157°27′E) by USS Ralph Talbot (United States Navy) after battle damage.
Jintsū	Imperial Japanese Navy	World War II: Battle of Kolombangara: The Sendai-class cruiser was torpedoed, shelled and sunk in the Pacific Ocean off the Solomon Islands (7°38′S 157°06′E) by Allied cruisers and destroyers. 482 crewmen were killed. 21 crew were rescued by I-180 (Imperial Japanese Navy) and two by United States Navy ships.
Nereide	Regia Marina	World War II: The Sirena-class submarine was sunk south east of the Straits of Messina (37°25′N 16°07′E) by HMS Echo and HMS Ilex (Royal Navy) with the loss of 21 lives.
Ste. Christophe	Germany	World War II: The cargo ship was bombed and sunk at Messina, Sicily, Italy by Allied aircraft.
Timothy Pickering	United States	World War II: The Liberty ship was bombed and set on fire in the Mediterranean Sea off Avola, Sicily (37°00′N 15°21′E) by Luftwaffe aircraft. A total of 127 of the 128 British troops, 16 of the 23 gunners, and 22 of the 43 crewmen on board were killed. She was then scuttled by a Royal Navy destroyer.
U-487	Kriegsmarine	World War II: The Type XIV submarine was sunk in the Atlantic Ocean (27°15′N 34°18′W) by Grumman TBF Avenger and Grumman F4F Wildcat aircraft based on USS Core (United States Navy) with the loss of 31 of her 68 crew. Survivors were rescued by USS Barker (United States Navy).
U-607	Kriegsmarine	World War II: The Type VIIC submarine was depth charged and sunk in the Atlantic Ocean north west of Cape Ortegal, Spain (45°02′N 9°14′W) by a Short Sunderland aircraft of 228 Squadron, Royal Air Force with the loss of 45 of her 52 crew. Survivors were rescued by HMS Wren (Royal Navy).
V 105 / Stefano Galleano	Regia Marina	World War II: The armed patrol schooner was sunk west of Ostia by gunfire from HNLMS Dolfijn (Royal Netherlands Navy). One of the crew was killed, two were reported missing and three were wounded.

== 14 July ==
List of shipwrecks: 14 July 1943
Ship	State	Description
Capitaine Le Diabat	Germany	World War II: The cargo ship was bombed and sunk off Montecristo, Italy by Allied aircraft.
Harvard	United Kingdom	World War II: The auxiliary schooner (114 GRT, 1891) was shelled and sunk in the Atlantic Ocean east of Trinidad (10°05′N 60°20′W) by U-572 (Kriegsmarine). All eight crew were rescued by USAT State of Virginia (United States Army).
HMMGB 641	Royal Navy	World War II: The motor gun boat (90/107 t, 1942) was sunk in the Strait of Messina by coastal battery fire and return fire from Nichelio (Regia Marina). The whole crew survived and were rescued by MGB 643 and MGB 646 (both Royal Navy).
I-179	Imperial Japanese Navy	The Kaidai VII (I-176-class) submarine sank in the Inland Sea of Japan off the Akizaki Lighthouse in a diving drill when a hatch was left open. Seventy-nine crew were killed. Raised and scrapped between April 1956 and March 1957.
USS LCT-19	United States Navy	World War II: The Mk. 5 landing craft tank was bombed and sunk by German aircraft off Salerno, Italy.
Robert Bacon	United States	World War II: The Liberty ship was torpedoed and sunk in the Indian Ocean off Portuguese East Africa (15°25′S 41°13′E) by U-178 (Kriegsmarine) with the loss of five of her 71 crew. Survivors were rescued by English Prince and Steaua Romana (both United Kingdom) or reached land in their lifeboat.
San Francisco	Germany	World War II: The cargo ship was bombed and sunk 35 nautical miles (65 km) west of Cape Corso, Corsica, France by British aircraft.
U-160	Kriegsmarine	World War II: The Type IXC submarine was sunk in the Atlantic Ocean by Grumman TBM Avenger and Grumman F4F Wildcat aircraft based on USS Santee (United States Navy) with the loss of all 57 crew.
V 265 Cesena	Regia Marina	World War II: The armed patrol schooner was sunk west off Calabria (39°16′N 17°13′E) by gunfire from HMS Unshaken (Royal Navy). There were six survivors, two of them wounded, nine were missing.
Venezia	Italy	World War II: The cargo ship was bombed and sunk at Messina, Sicily by Allied aircraft.

== 15 July ==
List of shipwrecks: 15 July 1943
Ship	State	Description
Aquitania	Italy	World War II: The cargo ship was torpedoed and sunk by aircraft off Barcelona, Spain, or was bombed and sunk in the Tyrrhenian Sea off Civitavecchia by Allied aircraft.
Empire Lake	United Kingdom	World War II: The cargo ship (2,852 GRT, 1941) was torpedoed and sunk in the Indian Ocean 240 nautical miles (440 km) east of Madagascar (21°27′S 51°47′E) by U-181 (Kriegsmarine) with the loss of 31 of her 38 crew.
Gilbert B. Walters	United Kingdom	World War II: The schooner (176 GRT, 1919) was shelled and sunk in the Atlantic Ocean south east of Trinidad (9°40′N 59°50′W) by U-572 (Kriegsmarine). All 11 crew survived.
Harmonic	United Kingdom	World War II: The cargo ship (4,558 GRT, 1930) was torpedoed and sunk in the South Atlantic 600 nautical miles (1,100 km) east of Rio de Janeiro, Brazil (23°00′S 33°00′W) by U-172 (Kriegsmarine) with the loss of one of her 47 crew. Survivors were rescued by Imhambane (Portugal).
MAS 535, MAS 548	Regia Marina	World War II: The MAS 526-class MAS boats were sunk at Termini Imerese by Allied aircraft.
Remo	Regia Marina	World War II: The R-class submarine was torpedoed and sunk in the Straits of Messina (39°19′N 17°30′E) by HMS United (Royal Navy). 55 crew were killed. The four survivors were rescued by the British submarine.
Twickenham	United Kingdom	World War II: Convoy OS 51: The cargo ship was torpedoed and severely damaged in the Atlantic Ocean off the Canary Islands (28°36′N 13°18′W by U-135 (Kriegsmarine). Twickenham was on a voyage from Hull, Yorkshire to Buenos Aires, Argentina. Initially taken under tow, she subsequently put in to Dakar, Senegal under her own steam. Following temporary repairs, she departed from Dakar on 21 October 1944 for South Shields, County Durham, where she was repaired and subsequently returned to service.
U-135	Kriegsmarine	World War II: The Type VIIC submarine was depth charged and sunk in the Atlantic Ocean (28°20′N 13°17′W) by HMS Balsam, HMS Mignonette, HMS Rochester (all Royal Navy) and an American Consolidated PBY Catalina aircraft with the loss of five of her 46 crew.
U-509	Kriegsmarine	World War II: The Type IXC submarine was torpedoed and sunk in the Atlantic Ocean north west of Madeira, Portugal (34°02′N 26°01′W) by Grumman TBF Avenger aircraft based on USS Santee (United States Navy) with the loss of all 54 crew.
U-759	Kriegsmarine	World War II: The Type VIIC submarine was depth charged and sunk in the Caribbean Sea (15°58′N 73°44′W) by a Martin PBM Mariner aircraft of the United States Navy with the loss of all 47 crew.
Unknown landing craft	Imperial Japanese Navy	World War II: The landing craft was sunk alongside the cruiser Nagara (Imperial Japanese Navy) when a mine detonated against Nagara at Kavieng, New Britain.

== 16 July ==
List of shipwrecks: 16 July 1943
Ship	State	Description
Bjørkhaug	Norway	World War II: The cargo ship was destroyed by the explosion of her cargo of land mines at Algiers, Algeria with the loss of nine of her 30 crew. Fort Confidence (United Kingdom) was set on fire. Around 1,000 people were killed in the port.
HMS Cleopatra	Royal Navy	World War II: The Dido-class cruiser was torpedoed and severely damaged in the Mediterranean Sea by Dandolo (Regia Marina). Repairs took until November 1944 to complete.
Fort Confidence	United Kingdom	The Fort ship (7,135 GRT, 1942) caught fire at Algiers following the explosion of Bjørkhaug (Norway). She was taken under tow by the tug Hudson (Netherlands) and was beached. She was declared a total loss.
Fort Franklin	United Kingdom	World War II: The Fort ship (7,135 GRT, 1942) was torpedoed and sunk in the Indian Ocean south east of Réunion (22°36′S 51°22′E) by U-181 (Kriegsmarine) with the loss of two of her 55 crew.
Nippon	Sweden	World War II: The fishing boat was sunk by a mine in the Skagerrak. The whole crew survived.
Richard Caswell	United States	World War II: The Liberty ship was torpedoed and sunk in the South Atlantic 150 nautical miles (280 km) off Floranapolis, Brazil (28°10′S 46°30′W) by U-513 (Kriegsmarine) with the loss of nine of her 69 crew. Survivors were rescued by USS Barnegat (United States Navy), Mexico (Argentina) or reached land in their lifeboats.
U-67	Kriegsmarine	World War II: The Type IXC submarine was depth charged and sunk in the Atlantic Ocean (30°05′N 44°17′W) by aircraft based on USS Core (United States Navy) with the loss of 48 of her 51 crew.
Urado Maru	Japan	The cargo ship was sunk in a collision with Seizan Maru (Japan) off Hojo. Survivors rescued by Seizan Maru.

== 17 July ==
List of shipwrecks: 17 July 1943
Ship	State	Description
City of Canton	United Kingdom	World War II: The cargo ship (6,692 GRT, 1916) was torpedoed and sunk in the Indian Ocean north east of Beira, Portuguese East Africa (13°52′S 41°10′E) by U-178 (Kriegsmarine) with the loss of eight of her 103 crew. One survivor was taken aboard U-178 as a prisoner of war, the rest were rescued by Lubao (Portugal) and Suffren (Free French Naval Forces).
Hatsuyuki	Imperial Japanese Navy	World War II: The Fubuki-class destroyer was bombed by US aircraft at Kahili, Shortland Islands (06°50′S 155°47′E) detonating the aft magazine and sinking her in shallow water. A total of 82 crewmen and 38 soldiers were killed.
M 346	Kriegsmarine	World War II: The M-class minesweeper was torpedoed and sunk by Shch-403 (Soviet Navy) in Tanafjord, Norway (71°07′N 28°19′E). 32 of her 76 crew were killed.
HMS MTB 316	Royal Navy	World War II: The Elco 77' PT boat (30/54 t, 1942) was shelled and sunk with the loss of all 11 hands by Scipione Africano (Regia Marina) off Reggio, Italy.
Ransæter	Norway	World War II: The coaster (236 GRT, 1927) struck a mine and sank off Sørfolda, Norway, with the loss of four of the 12 people aboard.
UJ 1705 Mob FD 61	Kriegsmarine	World War II: The submarine chaser was sunk off Sognesjøen, Norway by Bristol Beaufighter aircraft of 235 Squadron, Royal Air Force and 404 Squadron, Royal Canadian Air Force. Two crew died.

== 18 July ==
List of shipwrecks: 18 July 1943
Ship	State	Description
Amalia	Regia Marina	World War II: The auxiliary minesweeper was shelled and sunk in the Mediterranean Sea off the northeastern coast of Sardinia (40°42′N 9°49′E) by HMS Safari (Royal Navy). The 13 crew all survived. The master was captured by the British.
Costante Neri	Regia Marina	World War II: The auxiliary minesweeper was shelled and sunk east of the island of Gorgona, Italy by HMS Sickle (Royal Navy). The whole crew was rescued.
Dunarea 1	Romania	World War II: The lighter was sunk in the Kerch Strait by M-111 (Soviet Navy).
Incomati	United Kingdom	World War II: The passenger ship (7,369 GRT, 1934) was torpedoed and sunk in the Atlantic Ocean 200 nautical miles (370 km) south of Lagos, Nigeria (3°09′N 4°15′E) by U-508 (Kriegsmarine) with the loss of one of the 223 people aboard. Survivors were rescued by HMS Boadicea and HMS Bridgewater (both Royal Navy).
USS LST-342	United States Navy	World War II: The Mk 1 landing ship tank was torpedoed and sunk in the Solomon Sea by Ro-106 (Imperial Japanese Navy) south east of New Georgia (09°03′S 158°11′E).
Romolo	Regia Marina	World War II: The R-class submarine was bombed and sunk in the Ionian Sea east of Augusta, Sicily (37°20′N 16°18′E) by Vickers Wellington aircraft of 221 Squadron, Royal Air Force.
Rosa Madre	Regia Marina	World War II: The auxiliary minesweeper was shelled and sunk east of the island of Gorgona, Italy by HMS Sickle (Royal Navy). The whole crew was rescued.
USS YF-487	United States Navy	The self-propelled covered lighter sank in the Caribbean Sea.

== 19 July ==
List of shipwrecks: 19 July 1943
Ship	State	Description
USAT Delwood	United States Army	While laying fire-control cable, the 3,923-gross register ton, 320.7-foot (97.7 m) cable ship struck a submerged pinnacle bearing 190 degrees from Alexai Point (52°48′45″N 173°18′30″E) on Attu Island in the Aleutian Islands. Pulled off by USS Ute (United States Navy) and sank without loss of life.
Kaituna	United Kingdom	World War II: The tanker (4,914 GRT, 1938) was damaged by a limpet mine in the Mediterranean Sea off Cyprus and was consequently beached.
Mikage Maru No.20	Imperial Japanese Army	World War II: The Shinsei Maru No. 18-class transport was torpedoed and sunk in the Pacific Ocean off the Marshall Islands (18°45′N 166°04′E) by USS Porpoise (United States Navy). Three crewmen were killed.
NKI-09 Alane	Kriegsmarine	World War II: The patrol boat was torpedoed and sunk by S-56 (Soviet Navy) off Gamvik, Norway. 21 of her 45 crew were killed.
R-33	Kriegsmarine	World War II: The Type R-25 minesweeper was bombed and sunk by Soviet aircraft at Yalta, Soviet Union.
U-513	Kriegsmarine	World War II: The Type IXC submarine was depth charged and sunk in the South Atlantic south east of São Francisco do Sol, Brazil (27°17′S 47°32′W) by Martin PBM Mariner aircraft of the United States Navy with the loss of 46 of her 53 crew.
Vidar	Sweden	World War II: The cargo ship struck a mine and sank in the North Sea off Terschelling, Friesland, Netherlands. The whole crew survived.

== 20 July ==
List of shipwrecks: 20 July 1943
Ship	State	Description
F 147	Kriegsmarine	World War II: The Type A Marinefahrprahm was sunk by Allied fighter-bombers in the port of Riposto, Sicily. The whole crew was saved.
F 466	Kriegsmarine	World War II: The Type C Marinefahrprahm was sunk by Allied fighter-bombers in the port of Riposto, Sicily.
Fort Pelly	United Kingdom	World War II: The tanker (7,131 GRT, 1942) was bombed, caught fire, exploded and sank at Augusta, Sicily, Italy during a raid by enemy aircraft. Out of a crew of 47 and 23 gunners, 32 crew and 6 gunners were killed.
Kiyonami	Imperial Japanese Navy	World War II: The Yūgumo-class destroyer was bombed and sunk in the Pacific Ocean north north west of Kolombangara, Solomon Islands (7°13′S 156°45′E) by North American B-25 Mitchell aircraft of the United States Army Air Force. Lost with all hands, including survivors of Yūgure (Imperial Japanese Navy).
USS PT-166	United States Navy	World War II: The Elco 80' PT boat was sunk by friendly fire from North American B-25 Mitchell aircraft of the United States Army Air Force in the Ferguson Passage, off Vonavona Island, south of Kolombangara (08°15′S 156°53′E).
Silvio Onorato	Regia Marina	World War II: The armed yacht was torpedoed and sunk in the Mediterranean Sea by HMS Safari (Royal Navy).
U-558	Kriegsmarine	World War II: The Type VIIC submarine was depth charged and sunk in the Bay of Biscay (45°10′N 9°42′W) by two Consolidated B-24 Liberator aircraft of the 19th Bombardment Squadron, United States Army Air Forces and a Handley Page Halifax aircraft of 58 Squadron, Royal Air Force with the loss of 45 of her 50 crew. The survivors were rescued by HMCS Athabaskan (Royal Canadian Navy).
UJ 1423 Emanuella	Kriegsmarine	The submarine chaser struck a sunken wreck and foundered off Lorient, Morbihan, France.
V 805 Island	Kriegsmarine	World War II: The Vorpostenboot struck a mine and sank in the North Sea off Terschelling, Friesland, Netherlands (53°26′N 5°14′E) with the loss of 22 lives.
V 1014 Richard Ohlrogge	Kriegsmarine	World War II: The Vorpostenboot struck a mine and sank in the Great Belt.
V 6114	Kriegsmarine	World War II: The Vorpostenboot was torpedoed and sunk by a submarine off Gamvik, Norway.
Yūgure	Imperial Japanese Navy	World War II: The Hatsuharu-class destroyer was bombed and sunk in the Pacific Ocean north north west of Kolombangara (7°25′S 156°45′E) by Grumman TBM Avenger aircraft of the United States Marine Corps. Survivors were rescued by Kiyonami (Imperial Japanese Navy).

== 21 July ==
List of shipwrecks: 21 July 1943
Ship	State	Description
Empire Florizel	United Kingdom	World War II: Allied invasion of Sicily: The cargo ship (7,056 GRT, 1943) was bombed and sunk at Augusta, Sicily by Luftwaffe aircraft. Two of her crew, four gunners and three passengers were killed.
Harbor Minesweeper No. 3	Imperial Japanese Navy	The small harbor minesweeper was sunk in a collision with transport Hakozaki Maru (Imperial Japanese Navy) at Yokosuka.
Manolo	Spain	World War II: The fishing vessel was captured and scuttled by HMCS Iroquois (Royal Canadian Navy) in a prohibited area of Bay of Biscay. Her 14 crew were put aboard the destroyer.
MO-123	Soviet Navy	World War II: The MO-4-class patrol vessel was bombed and sunk by Focke-Wulf Fw 190 aircraft of 14.(Jabo)/JG 5 in Motovsky Bay while trying to rescue Soviet soldiers stranded on German held coast. There were 26 dead and 1 survivor. The other vessel involved in the rescue attempt, MO-111 (Soviet Navy), had 2 killed and 11 wounded.
Ocean Virtue	United Kingdom	World War II: The Ocean ship (7,174 GRT, 1942) was bombed and sunk at Augusta by Luftwaffe aircraft. She was salvaged later that year and converted with passenger accommodation in 1946.
Saipan Maru	Japan	World War II: The cargo ship was torpedoed and sunk in the Pacific Ocean north of Palau (16°29′N 123°57′E) by USS Haddock (United States Navy) with the loss of 2 crew and 33 passengers.
U-662	Kriegsmarine	World War II: The Type VIIC submarine was depth charged and sunk in the Amazon Estuary (3°56′N 48°46′W) by a Consolidated PBY Catalina aircraft of the United States Navy with the loss of 44 of her 47 crew. Survivors were rescued by USS Siren (United States Navy).

== 22 July ==
List of shipwrecks: 22 July 1943
Ship	State	Description
Durazzo	Regia Marina	World War II: The Fasana-class minelayer was sunk east of Corsica by HMS Safari (Royal Navy). There were four killed and three wounded.
Empire Moon	United Kingdom	World War II: The cargo ship (7,472 GRT, 1941) was torpedoed and damaged in the Mediterranean Sea (36°42′N 15°20′E) by U-81 (Kriegsmarine). She was towed to Syracuse, Sicily and beached. All 48 crew survived. Although declared a total loss, she was refloated in June 1945, repaired and returned to service.
F 149	Kriegsmarine	World War II: The Type A Marinefahrprahm, damaged by Allied fighter-bombers, ran aground on the northern coast of Sicily. She was scuttled after the failure of a rescue operation.
F 546	Kriegsmarine	World War II: The Type C Marinefahrprahm ran aground on the northern coast of Sicily while trying to help F 149. She was scuttled after the failure of a rescue operation.
Hudayi Bahri	Turkey	World War II: The vessel was shelled and sunk in the Bosphorus by L-4 (Soviet Navy).
Isolina Costade	Spain	World War II: The fishing vessel was captured and scuttled by HMCS Iroquois (Royal Canadian Navy) in a prohibited area of Bay of Biscay.
HMS MTB 288	Royal Navy	World War II: The Vosper 72'-class motor torpedo boat (37/45 t, 1943) was bombed and sunk by German aircraft off Augusta, Sicily.
Nisshin	Imperial Japanese Navy	World War II: The seaplane carrier was bombed and sunk by American aircraft off the south east tip of Bougainville Island, Solomon Islands (06°33′S 156°10′E). Five hundred and thirty-nine troops and an undetermined number of crew were killed; 91 troops and 87 crew were rescued.
Vivero	Spain	World War II: The fishing vessel was captured and scuttled by ORP Orkan (Polish Navy) in a prohibited area of Bay of Biscay.
VU-61	Soviet Navy	World War II: The G-5-class motor torpedo boat had been converted into a remotely-controlled boat and was used in an attack against Anapa. There was no crew aboard.

== 23 July ==
List of shipwrecks: 23 July 1943
Ship	State	Description
Aderno	Italy	World War II: The cargo liner was torpedoed and sunk in the Tyrrhenian Sea off Civitavecchia, Italy (42°04′N 11°47′E) by HMS Torbay (Royal Navy). There were 40 survivors.
RFA Alcides	Royal Fleet Auxiliary	World War II: The tanker (7,634 GRT, 1930) was torpedoed and sunk in the Indian Ocean (approximately 3°S 68°E) by I-10 (Imperial Japanese Navy). Twelve of her 52 crew were killed. The 40 survivors took to the lifeboats. Three officers were taken aboard I-10 as prisoners of war; the other 37 crew were massacred in the lifeboats.
Ascianghi	Regia Marina	World War II: The Adua-class submarine was depth charged and sunk in the Mediterranean Sea 10 nautical miles (19 km) off Augusta, Sicily by HMS Eclipse and HMS Laforey (both Royal Navy). 21 sailors were lost, while the British destroyers captured the 27 survivors, one of which died of wounds.
F 432	Kriegsmarine	The Type C Marinefahrprahm was damaged beyond repair by Allied fighter-bomber aircraft off the northern coast of Sicily and was scuttled by her crew. All aboard survived, 8 being wounded.
F 460	Kriegsmarine	World War II: The MFP-C landing craft was heavily damaged by Allied fighter-bomber aircraft off the northern coast of Sicily and was scuttled after a failed tow attempt. All aboard survived, two being wounded.
Gurpinar	Turkey	World War II: The vessel was shelled and sunk in the Bosphorus by L-4 (Soviet Navy).
M-152	Kriegsmarine	World War II: The Type 1935 minesweeper struck a mine and sank in the Gironde estuary, France, with the loss of 50 crew.
HMS Newfoundland	Royal Navy	World War II: The Crown Colony-class cruiser was torpedoed and damaged in the Mediterranean Sea off Syracuse, Sicily by U-407 (Kriegsmarine). One crew was killed and 6 wounded. Repairs took until November 1944 to complete.
U-527	Kriegsmarine	World War II: The Type IXC/40 submarine was depth charged and sunk in the Atlantic Ocean (35°25′N 27°56′W) by Grumman TBF Avenger aircraft based on USS Bogue (United States Navy) with the loss of 40 of her 49 crew.
U-598	Kriegsmarine	World War II: The Type VIIC submarine was depth charged and sunk in the Atlantic Ocean off Natal, Brazil (4°05′S 33°23′W) by two Consolidated B-24 Liberator aircraft of the United States Navy with the loss of 43 of her 45 crew.
U-613	Kriegsmarine	World War II: The Type VIIC submarine was depth charged and sunk in the Atlantic Ocean south of the Azores, Portugal (35°35′N 28°36′W) by USS George E. Badger (United States Navy) with the loss of all 48 crew.

== 24 July ==
List of shipwrecks: 24 July 1943
Ship	State	Description
Cicogna	Regia Marina	World War II: The Gabbiano-class corvette (670 GRT) was damaged beyond repair off Messina by Allied fighter-bombers and was run aground to avoid sinking. 20 crew were killed and one of the wounded died of wounds. She was abandonned and never repaired.
Fort Chilcotin	United Kingdom	World War II: The Fort ship (7,133 GRT, 1942) was torpedoed and sunk in the Atlantic Ocean 420 nautical miles (780 km) east south east of Bahia, Brazil (15°03′S 32°35′W) by U-172 (Kriegsmarine) with the loss of four of her 57 crew. Survivors were rescued by Tacito (Argentina).
Henzada	United Kingdom	World War II: The cargo ship (4,161 GRT, 1934) was torpedoed and sunk in the South Atlantic 100 nautical miles (190 km) south west of Rio de Janeiro, Brazil (25°30′S 44°00′W) by U-199 (Kriegsmarine) with the loss of two of her 64 crew. Survivors were rescued by Baltic (Panama).
Hoflein	Germany	World War II: The tugboat was sunk by mines near Temryuk with the loss of 11 lives.
Pegasus	Sweden	World War II: The tanker was torpedoed and sunk in the Indian Ocean south west of Madagascar (28°05′S 37°40′E) by U-197 (Kriegsmarine). All 38 crew were rescued by R-2 ( South African Air Force) and HMY Virginia (Royal Navy).
U-459	Kriegsmarine	World War II: The Type XIV submarine was attacked in the Atlantic Ocean off Cape Ortegal, Spain (45°53′N 10°38′W) by Vickers Wellington aircraft of 172 and 547 Squadrons, Royal Air Force with the loss of 18 of her 59 crew. She was scuttled due to damage received.
U-622	Kriegsmarine	World War II: The Type VIIC submarine was sunk at Trondheim, Norway (63°27′N 10°23′E) in a United States Army Air Forces raid. There were no casualties.

== 25 July ==
List of shipwrecks: 25 July 1943
Ship	State	Description
FO 16 Frundsberg	Kriegsmarine	The guard ship was sunk on this date.
Fasan	Germany	World War II: The hospital ship was bombed and sunk during an American air raid on Hamburg.
FR.70	Regia Marina	World War II: The minelayer was torpedoed and sunk in the Mediterranean Sea by HMS Safari (Royal Navy). There were 6 dead and 29 survivors.
G 1	Germany	World War II: The submarine chaser was destroyed on the stocks during an American air raid on Hamburg.
General Artigas	Kriegsmarine	World War II: The accommodation ship was bombed. caught fire, capsized and sunk at Hamburg. The wreck was refloated 1945–46 and scrapped.
Haakon Jarl	Norway	World War II: The cargo ship (2,102 GRT, 1943) was bombed and sunk at Hamburg in an Allied air raid. She was on her maiden voyage at the time. Refloated in November 1943, repairs completed in February 1947 and re-entered service as Svein Jarl.
Hermod	Germany	World War II: The cargo ship was sunk at Hamburg in an Allied air raid. She was refloated in 1950, repaired and entered West German service.
R-186	Kriegsmarine	World War II: The Type R-151 minesweeper was sunk off Spadafora, Italy (38°17′N 15°29′E) by Allied aircraft with the loss of two lives.
S 44	Kriegsmarine	World War II: The Type 1939/40 E-boat was bombed and sunk at Kiel, Germany. One crew was killed. She was raised the next day but declared a total loss.
S 77	Kriegsmarine	World War II: The Type 1939/40 E-boat was sunk by HMMGB 40 and HMMGB 42 (both Royal Navy) north of Dunkirk, France. 18 crew were killed.
Suwa Maru	Japan	World War II: The cargo ship was torpedoed and sunk in the Pacific Ocean by USS Finback, USS Seadragon and USS Tunny (all United States Navy).
T-904	Soviet Navy	World War II: The naval trawler struck a mine and sank in the Yugor Strait (69°34′N 59°56′E) with the loss of ten of her 45 crew. Survivors were rescued by T-879 and T-887 (both Soviet Navy).
Thames Maru	Imperial Japanese Army	World War II: Convoy 2323: The Daifuku Maru No. 1-class auxiliary transport was torpedoed, broke in two and sunk in the Pacific Ocean (02°46′N 148°35′E) 240 miles (390 km) north of Manus by USS Pompon (United States Navy). Two gunners and four crewmen were killed.
U-996	Kriegsmarine	World War II: The Type VIIC/41 submarine was sunk in an American air raid on Hamburg.
U-1011	Kriegsmarine	World War II: The Type VIIC/41 submarine was destroyed on the stocks during an American air raid on Hamburg.
U-1012	Kriegsmarine	World War II: The Type VIIC/41 submarine was destroyed on the stocks during an American air raid on Hamburg.
V 801 Max Gundelach	Kriegsmarine	World War II: The Vorpostenboot was sunk in the North Sea west of Terschelling, Friesland, Netherlands by Allied action. 11 crew were killed.
Vaterland	Germany	World War II: The ocean liner was destroyed by fire during an American air raid on Hamburg. Wreck scrapped in 1948.
Veendam	Germany	World War II: The barge was bombed and sunk during an American air raid on Hamburg.
Viminale	Italy	World War II: The troopship was sunk in the Mediterranean Sea (38°44′N 15°50′E) by USS PT-216, (United States Navy) while under tow from Melito di Porto Salvo to Taranto. Four crew were killed. There were 18 survivors.
Weissesee	Germany	World War II: The cargo ship was bombed and sunk by aircraft at Hamburg. Wreck raised and scrapped in 1949.
Zhdanov	Soviet Union	World War II: The trawler struck a mine and sank in the Matochkin Strait, Soviet Union.

== 26 July ==
List of shipwrecks: 26 July 1943
Ship	State	Description
Alberto Fassio	Italy	World War II: The tanker struck a mine and sank in the Gulf of Patras, Greece.
El Argentino	United Kingdom	World War II: The cargo ship was bombed and sunk in the Atlantic Ocean off Lisbon, Portugal (39°50′N 3°36′W) by Focke-Wulf Fw 200 aircraft of the Luftwaffe with the loss of four of the 104 people on board.
Empire Brutus	United Kingdom	World War II: The cargo ship was bombed and severely damaged in the Atlantic Ocean (39°50′N 13°38′W) by Luftwaffe aircraft and was abandoned by her crew. Subsequently reboarded, she was towed in to the Tagus by the tug Empire Samson (United Kingdom). Empire Brutus was repaired and returned to service.
Fishpool	United Kingdom	World War II: The cargo ship was bombed and sunk off Syracuse, Sicily, Italy (37°03′05″N 15°17′10″E) by Axis aircraft with the loss of 28 of her 53 crew. The wreck was removed in 1949.
Gyoraitei No. 115	Imperial Japanese Navy	The TM 4/No. 102-class motor torpedo boat burned at Rabaul.
U-359	Kriegsmarine	World War II: The Type VIIC submarine was depth charged and sunk in the Caribbean Sea south off the south west tip of Haiti (18°06′N 75°00′W) by a Martin PBM Mariner aircraft of the United States Navy with the loss of all 47 crew.

== 27 July ==
List of shipwrecks: 27 July 1943
Ship	State	Description
Akademik Shokalski	Soviet Union	World War II: The survey ship was shelled and sunk off Sporyji Navolok in the Kara Sea by U-255 (Kriegsmarine) with the loss of eleven of her 25 crew. Survivors were rescued by Poljarnik (Soviet Union).
Château Yquem	France	World War II: The cargo ship was torpedoed and sunk in the Mediterranean Sea (42°04′N 8°20′E) by HMS Usurper (Royal Navy).
Empire Highway	United Kingdom	World War II: The cargo ship was bombed and damaged west of Gibraltar. Subsequently repaired and returned to service.
Halizones	United Kingdom	World War II: Convoy OS52: The cargo ship was bombed and damaged in the Atlantic Ocean north west of Lisbon (38°04′N 12°59′W by Focke-Wulf Fw 200 aircraft of the Luftwaffe. She was taken in tow, but sank on 30 July at 37°22′N 13°03′W. There were no casualties.
Hamburg	Kriegsmarine	World War II: The decommissioned barracks ship, a former Bremen-class cruiser, was sunk in an American air raid on Hamburg. The wreck was raised in 1949 and scrapped in 1956.
Hirashima	Imperial Japanese Navy	World War II: The Sokuten-class minelayer was torpedoed and sunk in the East China Sea west of the Goto Islands, off Cape Ose, Fukue Jima (02°50′S 149°01′E) by USS Sawfish (United States Navy).
I-168	Imperial Japanese Navy	World War II: The Kaidai-class submarine was torpedoed and sunk in the Steffen Strait (31°00′N 130°33′E) by USS Scamp (United States Navy) with the loss of all 97 hands.
HMS LCT 353	Royal Navy	World War II: The Mk 3 landing craft tank (350/640 t, 1942) was bombed and sunk off Syracuse, Sicily by Italian aircraft. One sailor was killed.
Lighter No. 3032	Soviet Union	The tanker lighter was wrecked in the Caspian Sea near the Makhachkala.
No. 014	Soviet Navy	The MO-4-class patrol vessel was lost on this date.
No. 125	Soviet Navy	The MO-4-class patrol vessel was lost on this date.
Teikin Maru	Japan	World War II: The government-chartered British Wartime Standard Type C7 cargo ship (1,972 GRT, 1919) (a.k.a. Teikun Maru) struck a mine in the South China Sea off Hainan Island (19°57′N 109°05′E) and sank.

== 28 July ==
List of shipwrecks: 28 July 1943
Ship	State	Description
Ariake	Imperial Japanese Navy	World War II: The Hatsuharu-class destroyer was bombed and sunk off Cape Gloucester, New Guinea by North American B-25 Mitchell aircraft of the United States Army Air Forces.
Mikazuki	Imperial Japanese Navy	World War II: The Hatsuharu-class destroyer was bombed and sunk off Cape Gloucester by North American B-25 Mitchell aircraft of the United States Army Air Forces.
Buena Esperanca	Spain	World War II: The fishing vessel was captured by HMS Kite, HMS Woodpecker, HMS Woodcock and HMS Wild Goose (all Royal Navy) north west of Cape Ortgal and was scuttled. Her crew were put aboard the fishing vessel H. De Valterra (Spain) and allowed to return to Spain.
Comparrel	Spain	World War II: The fishing vessel was captured by HMS Kite, HMS Woodpecker, HMS Woodcock and HMS Wild Goose (all Royal Navy) north west of Cape Ortgal and was scuttled. Her crew were put aboard the fishing vessel H. De Valterra (Spain) and allowed to return to Spain.
Don Antonio	Spain	World War II: The fishing vessel was captured by HMS Kite, HMS Woodpecker, HMS Woodcock and HMS Wild Goose (all Royal Navy) north west of Cape Ortgal and was scuttled. Her crew were put aboard the fishing vessel H. De Valterra (Spain) and allowed to return to Spain.
El Viro X	Spain	World War II: The fishing vessel was captured by HMS Kite, HMS Woodpecker, HMS Woodcock and HMS Wild Goose (all Royal Navy) north west of Cape Ortgal and was scuttled. Her crew were put aboard the fishing vessel H. De Valterra (Spain) and allowed to return to Spain.
Europe 5	Spain	World War II: The fishing vessel was captured by HMS Kite, HMS Woodpecker, HMS Woodcock and HMS Wild Goose (all Royal Navy) north west of Cape Ortgal and was scuttled. Her crew were put aboard the fishing vessel H. De Valterra (Spain) and allowed to return to Spain.
Gapern	Sweden	World War II: The steamer was sunk during an air attack on Hamburg, Germany. One crew was killed. She was later raised and repaired.
Montenegro Costas	Spain	World War II: The fishing vessel was captured by HMS Kite, HMS Woodpecker, HMS Woodcock and HMS Wild Goose (all Royal Navy) north west of Cape Ortgal and was scuttled. Her crew were put aboard the fishing vessel H. De Valterra (Spain) and allowed to return to Spain.
Ro-103	Imperial Japanese Navy	World War II: The Ro-100-class submarine struck a mine and sank north of New Georgia, Solomon Islands. Lost with all 43 hands.
Rosalia	Netherlands	World War II: The tanker was torpedoed and sunk in the Caribbean Sea (12°07′N 69°13′W) by U-615 (Kriegsmarine) with the loss of 23 of her 36 crew. Survivors were rescued by HNLMS H-8 and HNLMS MBR-50 (both Royal Netherlands Navy).
Tamishima Maru	Japan	World War II: The cargo ship was bombed and sunk in the Andaman Sea south of Rangoon, Burma by Consolidated B-24 Liberator aircraft of the American Fourteenth Air Force.
U-159	Kriegsmarine	World War II: The Type IXC submarine was depth charged and sunk in the Caribbean Sea south of the Dominican Republic (15°47′N 68°30′W) by a Martin PBM Mariner aircraft of the United States Navy with the loss of all 53 crew.
U-404	Kriegsmarine	World War II: The Type VIIC submarine was depth charged and sunk in the Bay of Biscay north west of Cape Ortegal, Spain (45°53′N 9°25′W) by Consolidated B-24 Liberator aircraft of 224 Squadron, Royal Air Force and 4th Anti-Submarine Squadron, United States Army Air Forces.

== 29 July ==
List of shipwrecks: 29 July 1943
Ship	State	Description
Cornish City	United Kingdom	World War II: The cargo ship (4,952 GRT, 1936) was torpedoed and sunk in the Indian Ocean (27°20′S 52°10′E) by U-177 (Kriegsmarine) with the loss of 37 of her 43 crew. Survivors were rescued by HMAS Nizam (Royal Australian Navy).
Empire Darwin	United Kingdom	World War II: The cargo ship was bombed and damaged by Luftwaffe aircraft west of Cape Finisterre, Spain (44°52′N 16°00′W). Subsequently repaired and returned to service.
Pietro Micca	Regia Marina	World War II: The Pietro Micca-class submarine was sunk in the entrance to the Adriatic Sea (39°48′N 18°43′E) by HMS Trooper (Royal Navy).
S 137	Kriegsmarine	World War II: The S 38-class Schnellboot was sunk during an Allied air raid on Kiel, Germany. She was raised on 2 August but was later written off as damaged beyond repair.
USS Tuna	United States Navy	World War II: The Tambor-class submarine was depth charged and severely damaged by a Consolidated PBY Catalina of the Royal Australian Air Force. Repairs took until 21 August to complete.
U-614	Kriegsmarine	World War II: The Type VIIC submarine was depth charged and sunk in the Atlantic Ocean north west of Cape Finisterre, Spain (46°42′N 11°03′W) by a Vickers Wellington aircraft of 172 Squadron, Royal Air Force with the loss of all 49 crew.

== 30 July ==
List of shipwrecks: 30 July 1943
Ship	State	Description
Emba	Soviet Union	World War II: The tanker (7,886 GRT) was torpedoed and sunk in the port of Sokhumi by U-24 (Kriegsmarine).
Ryuzan Maru	Japan	World War II: The cargo ship was torpedoed and sunk in the Java Sea (6°31′S 111°26′E) by USS Finback (United States Navy).
T-911	Soviet Navy	World War II: Convoy BA 12: The auxiliary minesweeper was torpedoed and sunk in the Barents Sea off Novaya Zemlya (71°07′N 51°50′E) by U-703 (Kriegsmarine) with the loss of 28 of her 42 crew. Survivors were rescued by T-901 (Soviet Navy).
U-43	Kriegsmarine	World War II: The Type IXA submarine was torpedoed and sunk in the Atlantic Ocean (34°57′N 35°11′W) by Grumman TBF Avenger aircraft based on USS Santee (United States Navy) with the loss of all 55 crew.
U-375	Kriegsmarine	World War II: The Type VIIC submarine was depth charged and sunk in the Mediterranean Sea north west of Malta (36°40′N 12°28′E) by USS PC-624 (United States Navy) with the loss of all 46 hands.
U-461	Kriegsmarine	World War II: The Type XIV submarine was depth charged and sunk in the Bay of Biscay west of Cape Ortegal, Spain (45°33′N 10°48′W) by a Short Sunderland aircraft of 461 Squadron, Royal Australian Air Force with the loss of 53 of her 68 crew.
U-462	Kriegsmarine	World War II: The Type XIV submarine was depth charged and sunk in the Bay of Biscay (45°33′N 10°58′W) by a Handley Page Halifax aircraft of 502 Squadron, Royal Air Force and by HMS Kite, HMS Wild Goose, HMS Woodcock, HMS Woodpecker and HMS Wren (all Royal Navy) with the loss of one of her 65 crew.
U-504	Kriegsmarine	World War II: The Type IXC submarine was sunk in the Bay of Biscay by HMS Kite, HMS Wild Goose, HMS Wren and HMS Woodpecker (all Royal Navy) with the loss of all 53 crew.
U-591	Kriegsmarine	World War II: The Type VIIC submarine was depth charged and sunk in the South Atlantic (8°36′S 34°34′W) by a Lockheed Ventura aircraft of the United States Navy with the loss of nineteen of her 47 crew.

== 31 July ==
List of shipwrecks: 31 July 1943
Ship	State	Description
Constellation	United States	The schooner was driven onto a reef, or the wreck of North Carolina (United Kingdom), by strong currents 8.5 nautical miles (15.7 km) south west of Gibbs Hill Lighthouse, Bermuda.
Mogamigawa Maru	Imperial Japanese Navy	World War II: Convoy 3724: The aircraft transport was torpedoed and sunk in the South China Sea (11°04′N 153°18′E) north of Truk by USS Pogy (United States Navy). A total of 130 crew and passengers were killed; 600 survivors were rescued by Seiko Maru (Imperial Japanese Navy).
U-199	Kriegsmarine	World War II: The Type IXD2 submarine was depth charged and sunk in the South Atlantic (23°54′S 42°54′W) by a Consolidated PBY Catalina and an A-28 aircraft of the Brazilian Navy and a Martin PBM Mariner aircraft of the United States Navy with the loss of 49 of her 61 crew. Her captain and eleven crewmen were rescued by USS Barnegat (United States Navy) and made prisoners of war.
V 624 Köln	Kriegsmarine	World War II: The naval drifter/Vorpostenboot was heavily damaged by a mine off the Loire estuary. She was towed to Saint-Nazaire and was not repaired until the end of the war.

== Unknown date ==
List of shipwrecks: Unknown date in July 1943
Ship	State	Description
Katendrecht	Netherlands	The cargo ship was damaged in a collision with another vessel and further damaged by weather. She put in to New York, United States and was laid up. She was scrapped in 1946–47.
Magdaleine Vinnen	Germany	World War II: The cargo ship was severely damaged in an Allied air raid on Hamburg. She was towed to Copenhagen, Denmark for repairs. Seized as a prize of war in 1945, she was later repaired and entered service as Empire Ribble under the British flag.
P. B. 5	United Kingdom	The concrete petrol barge was beached as part of a landing exercise near Tenby, South Wales, but suffered a broken back sometime in July.
HMS Parthian	Royal Navy	World War II: The Parthian-class submarine (1,760/2,040 t, 1931) was lost in the Adriatic Sea sometime after 28 July with the loss of all 65 crew.
ShCh-422	Soviet Navy	World War II: The Shchuka-class submarine struck a mine and sank off northern Norway between 5 and 28 July with all 45 crew.
U-647	Kriegsmarine	World War II: The Type VIIC submarine was lost on patrol in the Atlantic Ocean north of the Shetland Islands, United Kingdom on or after 28 July with the loss of all 48 crew. Cause unknown.
