= German submarine U-759 =

German World War II submarine

History

Nazi Germany
- Name: U-759
- Ordered: 9 October 1939
- Builder: Kriegsmarinewerft Wilhelmshaven
- Yard number: 142
- Laid down: 15 November 1940
- Launched: 30 May 1942
- Commissioned: 15 August 1942
- Fate: Sunk on 15 July 1943

General characteristics
- Class & type: Type VIIC submarine
- Displacement: 769 tonnes (757 long tons) surfaced; 871 t (857 long tons) submerged
- Length: 67.10 m (220 ft 2 in) o/a; 50.50 m (165 ft 8 in) pressure hull
- Beam: 6.20 m (20 ft 4 in) o/a; 4.70 m (15 ft 5 in) pressure hull
- Height: 9.60 m (31 ft 6 in)
- Draught: 4.74 m (15 ft 7 in)
- Installed power: 2,800–3,200 PS (2,100–2,400 kW; 2,800–3,200 bhp) (diesels); 750 PS (550 kW; 740 shp) (electric)
- Propulsion: 2 shafts; 2 × diesel engines; 2 × electric motors
- Speed: 17.7 knots (32.8 km/h; 20.4 mph) surfaced; 7.6 knots (14.1 km/h; 8.7 mph) submerged
- Range: 8,500 nmi (15,700 km; 9,800 mi) at 10 knots (19 km/h; 12 mph) surfaced; 80 nmi (150 km; 92 mi) at 4 knots (7.4 km/h; 4.6 mph) submerged
- Test depth: 230 m (750 ft); Crush depth: 250–295 m (820–968 ft)
- Complement: 4 officers, 40–56 enlisted
- Armament: 5 × 53.3 cm (21 in) torpedo tubes (four bow, one stern); 14 × torpedoes; 1 × 8.8 cm (3.46 in) deck gun (220 rounds); 1 × twin 2 cm (0.79 in) C/30 anti-aircraft gun

Service record
- Part of: 5th U-boat Flotilla; 15 August 1942 – 31 January 1943; 9th U-boat Flotilla; 1 February – 15 July 1943
- Identification codes: M 46 926
- Commanders: Oblt.z.S. / Kptlt. Rudolf Friedrich; 15 August 1942 – 15 July 1943
- Operations: 2 patrols: 1st patrol: 2 February – 14 March 1943; 2nd patrol: 7 June – 15 July 1943
- Victories: 2 merchant ships sunk (12,764 GRT)

German submarine U-759 was a Type VIIC U-boat of Nazi Germany's Kriegsmarine during World War II. The submarine was laid down on 15 November 1940 at the Kriegsmarinewerft yard at Wilhelmshaven, launched on 30 May 1942, and commissioned on 15 August 1942 under the command of Oberleutnant zur See Rudolf Friedrich.

== Design ==
German Type VIIC submarines were preceded by the shorter Type VIIB submarines. U-759 had a displacement of 769 tonnes (757 long tons) when at the surface and 871 tonnes (857 long tons) while submerged. She had a total length of 67.10 m (220 ft 2 in), a pressure hull length of 50.50 m (165 ft 8 in), a beam of 6.20 m (20 ft 4 in), a height of 9.60 m (31 ft 6 in), and a draught of 4.74 m (15 ft 7 in). The submarine was powered by two Germaniawerft F46 four-stroke, six-cylinder supercharged diesel engines producing a total of 2,800 to 3,200 metric horsepower (2,060 to 2,350 kW; 2,760 to 3,160 shp) for use while surfaced, two Garbe, Lahmeyer & Co. RP 137/c double-acting electric motors producing a total of 750 metric horsepower (550 kW; 740 shp) for use while submerged. She had two shafts and two 1.23 m (4 ft) propellers. The boat was capable of operating at depths of up to 230 metres (750 ft).

The submarine had a maximum surface speed of 17.7 knots (32.8 km/h; 20.4 mph) and a maximum submerged speed of 7.6 knots (14.1 km/h; 8.7 mph). When submerged, the boat could operate for 80 nautical miles (150 km; 92 mi) at 4 knots (7.4 km/h; 4.6 mph); when surfaced, she could travel 8,500 nautical miles (15,700 km; 9,800 mi) at 10 knots (19 km/h; 12 mph). U-759 was fitted with five 53.3 cm (21 in) torpedo tubes (four fitted at the bow and one at the stern), fourteen torpedoes, one 8.8 cm (3.46 in) SK C/35 naval gun, 220 rounds, and one twin 2 cm (0.79 in) C/30 anti-aircraft gun. The boat had a complement of between forty-four and sixty.

== Service history ==
After training with 5th U-boat Flotilla at Kiel, Germany, on 1 February 1943 U-759 was transferred to 9th U-boat Flotilla, based in Brest, France, for front-line service. She sailed on two combat patrols and sank two ships totalling 12,764 gross register tons (GRT). U-759 was sunk east of Jamaica on 15 July 1943 by depth charges from a US Navy Mariner patrol bomber. All hands were lost.

=== First patrol ===
U-759 first sailed from Kiel on 2 February 1943, and out into the Atlantic, south of Greenland. She had no successes, and arrived at Lorient, France on 14 March after 41 days.

=== Second patrol ===
U-759 left Lorient on 7 June 1943 and sailed across the Atlantic to the Caribbean Sea. There on 5 July, about 70 nautical miles (130 km) west of Port-Salut, Haiti, she torpedoed the 3,513 GRT American merchant ship Maltran, part of Convoy GTMO-134. The ship sank in 15 minutes, but all 47 aboard escaped in lifeboats, and were picked up by USS SC-1279.

Two days later, on 7 July, the U-boat torpedoed and sank the 9,251 GRT Dutch cargo ship Poelau Roebiah, in convoy TAG-70, east of Jamaica. All but two of the 68 crew, along with 24 armed guards and 31 US passengers abandoned ship in four lifeboats and were later rescued. After sinking the Dutch ship the U-boat was pursued and attacked by the United States destroyer Tattnall (DD-125), but escaped. The next day, 8 July, U-759 was spotted and attacked by a United States Navy scout aircraft. Allied surface ships attacked for seven hours, but the U-boat evaded them and escaped unharmed.

=== Fate ===
U-759 was sunk on 15 July 1943 by depth charges from a US Navy Mariner aircraft from Squadron VP-32 in the Caribbean, in approximate position 15°58′N 73°44′W. All 47 crew were lost.

=== Wolfpacks ===
U-759 took part in one wolfpack, namely:

- Neptun (18 February – 3 March 1943)

== Summary of raiding history ==
Date	Ship Name	Nationality	Tonnage (GRT)	Fate
5 July 1943	Maltran	United States	3,513	Sunk
7 July 1943	Poelau Roebiah	Netherlands	9,251	Sunk

== Bibliography ==
- Busch, Rainer; Röll, Hans-Joachim (1999). German U-boat commanders of World War II : a biographical dictionary. Translated by Brooks, Geoffrey. London, Annapolis, Md: Greenhill Books, Naval Institute Press. ISBN 1-55750-186-6.
- Busch, Rainer; Röll, Hans-Joachim (1999). Der U-Boot-Krieg, 1939-1945: Deutsche U-Boot-Verluste von September 1939 bis Mai 1945 [German U-boat losses from September 1939 to May 1945] (in German). Vol. IV. Hamburg, Berlin, Bonn: Mittler. ISBN 3-8132-0514-2.
- Gröner, Eric; Jung, Dieter; Maass, Martin (1991). German Warships 1815-1945: U-boats and Mine Warfare Vessels. Vol. 2. Translated by Thomas, Keith; Magowan, Rachel. London: Conway Maritime Press. ISBN 0-85177-593-4.
- Bishop, Chris (2006). Kriegsmarine U-Boats, 1939-45. London: Amber Books. ISBN 978-1-904687-96-2.
