= HMS Labuan =

Colony-class frigate

History

United States
- Name: Harvey
- Namesake: British name assigned in anticipation of ship's transfer to United Kingdom
- Builder: Walsh-Kaiser Company, Providence, Rhode Island
- Laid down: 7 August 1943
- Renamed: Gold Coast, 1943
- Reclassified: Patrol frigate, PF-80, 15 April 1943
- Namesake: Gold Coast
- Renamed: Labuan, 1943
- Namesake: Labuan
- Launched: 21 September 1943
- Identification: PG-188
- Fate: Transferred to United Kingdom 5 February 1944
- Acquired: Returned by United Kingdom 13 May 1946
- Fate: Sold 9 July 1957 for scrapping

United Kingdom
- Name: HMS Labuan
- Namesake: Labuan
- Acquired: 5 February 1944
- Commissioned: 5 February 1944
- Identification: K584
- Fate: Returned to United States 13 May 1946

General characteristics
- Class & type: Colony/Tacoma-class patrol frigate
- Displacement: 1,264 long tons (1,284 t)
- Length: 303 ft 11 in (92.63 m)
- Beam: 37 ft 6 in (11.43 m)
- Draft: 13 ft 8 in (4.17 m)
- Propulsion: 3 × boilers; 2 × turbines, 5,500 shp (4,100 kW) each; 2 shafts
- Speed: 20 knots (37 km/h; 23 mph)
- Complement: 190
- Armament: 3 × single 3-inch/50 cal. AA guns; 2 × twin Bofors 40 mm guns; 9 × single Oerlikon 20 mm cannon; 1 × Hedgehog anti-submarine mortar; 8 × Y gun depth charge projectors; 2 × depth charge racks

HMS Labuan (K584), ex-Gold Coast, was a Colony-class frigate of the United Kingdom which served in the Royal Navy during World War II. She was originally ordered by the United States Navy as the Tacoma-class patrol frigate USS Harvey (PF-80) and briefly renamed Gold Coast before she was transferred to the Royal Navy prior to completion.

== Construction and acquisition ==
The ship, originally designated a "patrol gunboat," PG-188, was ordered by the United States Maritime Commission under a United States Navy contract as USS Harvey. She was reclassified as a "patrol frigate," PF-80, on 15 April 1943 and laid down by the Walsh-Kaiser Company at Providence, Rhode Island, on 7 August 1943. Intended for transfer to the United Kingdom, the ship was renamed Gold Coast and then again renamed Labuan by the British prior to launching. She was launched on 21 September 1943.

== Service history ==
Transferred to the United Kingdom under Lend-Lease on 5 February 1944, the ship served in the Royal Navy as HMS Labuan (pennant K584) on patrol and escort duty in the English Channel. On 27 February 1945, she shared credit with the British frigate HMS Loch Fada and the British sloop HMS Wild Goose for the sinking with depth charges of the German submarine U-1279 in the western part of the English Channel at 49°46′00″N 005°47′00″W.

The United Kingdom returned Labuan to the U.S. Navy on 13 May 1946. She was sold to the Heggie Iron and Metal Company of Dorchester, Massachusetts, on 9 July 1957 for scrapping.
