= German submarine U-178 =

German World War II submarine

History

Nazi Germany
- Name: U-178
- Ordered: 28 May 1940
- Builder: DeSchiMAG AG Weser, Bremen
- Yard number: 1018
- Laid down: 24 December 1940
- Launched: 25 October 1941
- Commissioned: 14 February 1942
- Fate: Scuttled, 25 August 1944

General characteristics
- Class & type: Type IXD2 submarine
- Displacement: 1,610 t (1,580 long tons) surfaced; 1,799 t (1,771 long tons) submerged
- Length: 87.58 m (287 ft 4 in) o/a; 68.50 m (224 ft 9 in) pressure hull
- Beam: 7.50 m (24 ft 7 in) o/a; 4.40 m (14 ft 5 in) pressure hull
- Height: 10.20 m (33 ft 6 in)
- Draught: 5.35 m (17 ft 7 in)
- Installed power: 9,000 PS (6,620 kW; 8,880 bhp) (diesels); 1,000 PS (740 kW; 990 shp) (electric)
- Propulsion: 2 shafts; 2 × diesel engines; 2 × electric motors
- Speed: 20.8 knots (38.5 km/h; 23.9 mph) surfaced; 6.9 knots (12.8 km/h; 7.9 mph) submerged
- Range: 12,750 nmi (23,610 km; 14,670 mi) at 10 knots (19 km/h; 12 mph) surfaced; 57 nmi (106 km; 66 mi) at 4 knots (7.4 km/h; 4.6 mph) submerged
- Test depth: 230 m (750 ft)
- Complement: 55 to 64
- Armament: 6 × torpedo tubes (four bow, two stern); 24 × 53.3 cm (21 in) torpedoes; 1 × 10.5 cm (4.1 in) L/45 deck gun with 150 rounds; 1 × 3.7 cm (1.5 in) SK C/30 AA gun; 2 × 2 cm (0.79 in) C/30 anti-aircraft guns

Service record
- Part of: 4th U-boat Flotilla; 14 February - 31 August 1942; 10th U-boat Flotilla; 1 September - 31 October 1942; 12th U-boat Flotilla; 1 November 1942 - 1 August 1944
- Identification codes: M 36 887
- Commanders: Kapt.z.S. Hans Ibbeken; 14 February 1942 - 21 February 1943; K.Kapt. Wilhelm Dommes; 22 February - 25 November 1943; Kptlt. Wilhelm Spahr; 25 November 1943 - 25 August 1944
- Operations: 3 patrols: 1st patrol: a. 8 September 1942 - 10 January 1943; b. 7–9 March 1943; 2nd patrol: a. 28 March - 27 August 1943; b. 9–11 October 1943; c. 23–25 October 1943; d. 6–8 November 1943; e. 23–4 November 1943; 3rd patrol: 27 November 1943 - 25 May 1944
- Victories: 13 merchant ships sunk (87,030 GRT); 1 merchant ship damaged (6,348 GRT)

German submarine U-178 was a Type IXD2 U-boat of Nazi Germany's Kriegsmarine built for service during World War II.

Ordered on 28 May 1940, the U-boat was laid down on 24 December 1940 at the AG Weser yard in Bremen as yard number 1018. She was launched on 25 October 1941 and commissioned on 14 February 1942, under the command of Fregattenkapitän Hans Ibekken.

== Design ==
German Type IXD2 submarines were considerably larger than the original Type IXs. U-178 had a displacement of 1,610 tonnes (1,580 long tons) when at the surface and 1,799 tonnes (1,771 long tons) while submerged. The U-boat had a total length of 87.58 m (287 ft 4 in), a pressure hull length of 68.50 m (224 ft 9 in), a beam of 7.50 m (24 ft 7 in), a height of 10.20 m (33 ft 6 in), and a draught of 5.35 m (17 ft 7 in). The submarine was powered by two MAN M 9 V 40/46 supercharged four-stroke, nine-cylinder diesel engines plus two MWM RS34.5S six-cylinder four-stroke diesel engines for cruising, producing a total of 9,000 metric horsepower (6,620 kW; 8,880 shp) for use while surfaced, two Siemens-Schuckert 2 GU 345/34 double-acting electric motors producing a total of 1,000 shaft horsepower (1,010 PS; 750 kW) for use while submerged. She had two shafts and two 1.85 m (6 ft) propellers. The boat was capable of operating at depths of up to 200 metres (660 ft).

The submarine had a maximum surface speed of 20.8 knots (38.5 km/h; 23.9 mph) and a maximum submerged speed of 6.9 knots (12.8 km/h; 7.9 mph). When submerged, the boat could operate for 121 nautical miles (224 km; 139 mi) at 2 knots (3.7 km/h; 2.3 mph); when surfaced, she could travel 12,750 nautical miles (23,610 km; 14,670 mi) at 10 knots (19 km/h; 12 mph). U-178 was fitted with six 53.3 cm (21 in) torpedo tubes (four fitted at the bow and two at the stern), 24 torpedoes, one 10.5 cm (4.13 in) SK C/32 naval gun, 150 rounds, and a 3.7 cm (1.5 in) SK C/30 with 2575 rounds as well as two 2 cm (0.79 in) C/30 anti-aircraft guns with 8100 rounds. The boat had a complement of fifty-five.

== First patrol ==
U-178 sailed from Kiel on 8 September 1942 into the Atlantic, passing north of Scotland and then turned south. She made her first kill on 10 October, putting three torpedoes into the unescorted passenger ship Duchess of Atholl, a Canadian Pacific Steamship Co. liner chartered as a troop transport, about 200 nmi (370 km; 230 mi) ENE of Ascension Island in the South Atlantic. The vessel sank slowly and only five crew members were lost. The master, 267 crew members, 25 gunners and all 534 passengers were later rescued by a British vessel.

U-178 then sailed around the Cape of Good Hope into the Indian Ocean south and east of South Africa, sinking the British troopship Mendoza on 1 November, killing the master, 19 crew members, three gunners and three passengers, while 127 of the crew, three gunners and 250 passengers were later picked up by a South African patrol ship and an American merchantman.

U-178 struck twice on 4 November, sinking both the British merchantman Trekieve and the Norwegian cargo ship Hai Hing, off Mozambique.

The British merchant ship Louise Moller was sunk about 240 nmi (440 km; 280 mi) ExS of Durban on 13 November; two days later the U-boat attacked the British merchant ship Adviser. Seeing the crew abandon the apparently sinking ship, U-178 left the area after hearing depth charges being dropped in the distance. However, Adviser was taken in tow to Durban, where she was repaired and returned to service.

U-178's last victory was on 27 November, sinking the American Liberty ship SS Jeremiah Wadsworth around 270 nmi (500 km; 310 mi) S of Cape Agulhas.

U-178 then shaped her course north through the Atlantic, arriving at Bordeaux in France on 10 January 1943 after 125 days at sea.

== Second patrol ==
Under a new commander, Korvettenkapitän Wilhelm Dommes, U-178 sailed from Bordeaux on 28 March 1943, and repeated the success of her previous patrol, this time in the waters of the Mozambique Channel.

Her first victory came on 1 June in a hit-and-run attack on Convoy CD-20. U-178 fired two torpedoes, one of which struck the Dutch cargo ship Salabangka, which later sank.

On 4 July she attacked the Norwegian steamer Breiviken, a straggler from Convoy DN-50. The ship sank within three minutes; U-178 spent some time picking up the crew from the sea and putting them onto rafts. The survivors of Breiviken later found two drifting lifeboats from their own ship, and on 7 July reached the coast. U-178 sailed off in pursuit of another victim, sinking the Greek merchant ship Michael Livanos later that day. On 11 July her sister ship Mary Livanos was also sunk by U-178.

In the early hours of 14 July, the American Liberty ship Robert Bacon was torpedoed about 35 miles off the Mozambique Light. The crew of 44 and 27 Armed Guards (the ship was armed with two 3-inch and eight 20 mm guns), abandoned ship before U-178 finished her off with two more torpedoes. The U-boat surfaced and questioned the survivors in one of the boats, giving them directions to land and wishing them good luck before leaving.

U-178 made her last kill of the patrol on 17 July, sinking the British cargo ship City of Canton northeast of Beira after a pursuit lasting eighteen hours. She then shaped a course across the Indian Ocean to Penang, arriving there on 27 August after 153 days at sea.

== Third patrol ==
K.Kapt. Dommes remained at Penang, commanding the U-Boat base there, located in the former British seaplane headquarters. U-178 sailed from Penang on 25 November 1943 with Kapitänleutnant Wilhelm Spahr in command. She made only one kill, sinking the American Liberty ship SS José Navarro 175 nmi (324 km; 201 mi) SW of Cochin, India (now known as Kochi). She then sailed around Africa, back through the Atlantic, arriving in Bordeaux on 25 May 1944 after a voyage of 181 days (her longest).

== Fate ==
U-178 was scuttled on 25 August 1944 at Bordeaux, as she was not deemed seaworthy enough to escape the Allied advance. The U-boat was broken up in 1947.

== Summary of raiding history ==
Date	Ship	Nationality	Tonnage (GRT)	Fate
10 October 1942	Duchess of Atholl	United Kingdom	20,119	Sunk
1 November 1942	Mendoza	United Kingdom	8,233	Sunk
4 November 1942	Hai Hing	Norway	2,561	Sunk
4 November 1942	Trekieve	United Kingdom	5,244	Sunk
13 November 1942	Louise Moller	United Kingdom	3,764	Sunk
15 November 1942	SS Adviser	United Kingdom	6,348	Damaged
27 November 1942	Jeremiah Wadsworth	United States	7,176	Sunk
1 June 1943	Salabangka	Netherlands	6,586	Sunk
4 July 1943	Breiviken	Norway	2,669	Sunk
4 July 1943	Michael Livanos	Greece	4,774	Sunk
11 July 1943	Mary Livanos	Greece	4,771	Sunk
14 July 1943	Robert Bacon	United States	7,197	Sunk
17 July 1943	City of Canton	United Kingdom	6,692	Sunk
27 December 1943	José Navarro	United States	7,244	Sunk

== Bibliography ==
- Busch, Rainer; Röll, Hans-Joachim (1999). German U-boat commanders of World War II : a biographical dictionary. Translated by Brooks, Geoffrey. London, Annapolis, Md: Greenhill Books, Naval Institute Press. ISBN 1-55750-186-6.
- Busch, Rainer; Röll, Hans-Joachim (1999). Deutsche U-Boot-Verluste von September 1939 bis Mai 1945 [German U-boat losses from September 1939 to May 1945]. Der U-Boot-Krieg (in German). Vol. IV. Hamburg, Berlin, Bonn: Mittler. ISBN 3-8132-0514-2.
- Gröner, Erich; Jung, Dieter; Maass, Martin (1991). U-boats and Mine Warfare Vessels. German Warships 1815–1945. Vol. 2. Translated by Thomas, Keith; Magowan, Rachel. London: Conway Maritime Press. ISBN 0-85177-593-4.
