= German submarine U-1279 =

German World War II submarine

- U-995 Type VIIC/41 at the Laboe Naval Memorial. This U-boat is almost identical to U-1279.

History

Nazi Germany
- Name: U-1279
- Ordered: 13 June 1942
- Builder: Bremer Vulkan AG, Bremen
- Yard number: 74
- Laid down: 26 August 1943
- Commissioned: 5 July 1944
- Fate: Sunk on 27 February 1945

General characteristics
- Type: Type VIIC/41 submarine
- Displacement: 757 long tons (769 t) surfaced; 857 long tons (871 t) submerged
- Length: 67.23 m (220 ft 7 in) o/a; 50.50 m (165 ft 8 in) pressure hull
- Beam: 6.20 m (20 ft 4 in) o/a; 4.70 m (15 ft 5 in) pressure hull
- Height: 9.60 m (31 ft 6 in)
- Draught: 4.74 m (15 ft 7 in)
- Installed power: 2 × diesel engines; 2,800–3,200 PS (2,100–2,400 kW; 2,800–3,200 bhp) (diesels); 750 PS (550 kW; 740 shp) (electric)
- Propulsion: 2 × electric motors; 2 × screws
- Speed: 17.7 knots (32.8 km/h; 20.4 mph) surfaced; 7.6 knots (14.1 km/h; 8.7 mph) submerged
- Range: 8,500 nmi (15,700 km; 9,800 mi) at 10 knots (19 km/h; 12 mph) surfaced; 80 nmi (150 km; 92 mi) at 4 knots (7.4 km/h; 4.6 mph) submerged
- Test depth: 250 m (820 ft); Calculated crush depth: 250–295 m (820–968 ft)
- Complement: 44-52 officers & ratings
- Armament: 5 × 53.3 cm (21 in) torpedo tubes (4 bow, 1 stern); 14 × torpedoes; 1 × 8.8 cm (3.46 in) deck gun (220 rounds); 1 × 3.7 cm (1.5 in) Flak M42 AA gun; 2 × 2 cm (0.79 in) C/30 AA guns

Service record
- Part of: 8th U-boat Flotilla; 5 July 1944 – 31 January 1945; 11th U-boat Flotilla; 1 – 27 February 1945
- Identification codes: M 30 807
- Commanders: Oblt.z.S. Hans Falke; 5 July 1944 – 27 February 1945
- Operations: 1 patrol: 29 January – 27 February 1945
- Victories: None

German submarine U-1279 was a Type VIIC/41 U-boat of Nazi Germany's Kriegsmarine during World War II.

She was ordered on 13 June 1942, and was laid down on 26 August 1943, at Bremer Vulkan AG, Bremen, as yard number 74. She was commissioned under the command of Oberleutnant zur See Hans Falke on 5 July 1944.

== Design ==
German Type VIIC/41 submarines were preceded by the heavier Type VIIC submarines. U-1279 had a displacement of 769 tonnes (757 long tons) when at the surface and 871 tonnes (857 long tons) while submerged. She had a total length of 67.10 m (220 ft 2 in), a pressure hull length of 50.50 m (165 ft 8 in), an overall beam of 6.20 m (20 ft 4 in), a height of 9.60 m (31 ft 6 in), and a draught of 4.74 m (15 ft 7 in). The submarine was powered by two Germaniawerft F46 four-stroke, six-cylinder supercharged diesel engines producing a total of 2,800 to 3,200 metric horsepower (2,060 to 2,350 kW; 2,760 to 3,160 shp) for use while surfaced, two AEG GU 460/8–276 double-acting electric motors producing a total of 750 metric horsepower (550 kW; 740 shp) for use while submerged. She had two shafts and two 1.23 m (4 ft) propellers. The boat was capable of operating at depths of up to 230 metres (750 ft).

The submarine had a maximum surface speed of 17.7 knots (32.8 km/h; 20.4 mph) and a maximum submerged speed of 7.6 knots (14.1 km/h; 8.7 mph). When submerged, the boat could operate for 80 nautical miles (150 km; 92 mi) at 4 knots (7.4 km/h; 4.6 mph); when surfaced, she could travel 8,500 nautical miles (15,700 km; 9,800 mi) at 10 knots (19 km/h; 12 mph). U-1279 was fitted with five 53.3 cm (21 in) torpedo tubes (four fitted at the bow and one at the stern), fourteen torpedoes, one 8.8 cm (3.46 in) SK C/35 naval gun, (220 rounds), one 3.7 cm (1.5 in) Flak M42 and two 2 cm (0.79 in) C/30 anti-aircraft guns. The boat had a complement of between forty-four and fifty-two.

== Service history ==
U-1279 left on her first and only war patrol on 29 January 1945. At this time she was, and probably had been prior to, fitted with a Schnorchel underwater-breathing apparatus. Thirty days into her patrol she was spotted and attacked by the British frigates HMS Labuan, HMS Loch Fada, the British sloop HMS Wild Goose and a US Liberator aircraft from VPB-112 in the English Channel east of the Scilly Isles. She was sunk on 27 February 1945 by depth charges, killing all 48 of her crew.

The wreck now lies at 49°46′N 05°47′W.

== See also ==
- Battle of the Atlantic

== Bibliography ==
=== Books ===
- Busch, Rainer; Röll, Hans-Joachim (1999). German U-boat commanders of World War II : a biographical dictionary. Translated by Brooks, Geoffrey. London, Annapolis, Md: Greenhill Books, Naval Institute Press. ISBN 1-55750-186-6.
- Busch, Rainer; Röll, Hans-Joachim (1999). Deutsche U-Boot-Verluste von September 1939 bis Mai 1945 [German U-boat losses from September 1939 to May 1945]. Der U-Boot-Krieg (in German). Vol. IV. Hamburg, Berlin, Bonn: Mittler. ISBN 3-8132-0514-2.
- Gröner, Erich; Jung, Dieter; Maass, Martin (1991). U-boats and Mine Warfare Vessels. German Warships 1815–1945. Vol. 2. Translated by Thomas, Keith; Magowan, Rachel. London: Conway Maritime Press. ISBN 0-85177-593-4.

=== Online sources ===
- Helgason, Guðmundur. "Hans Falke". German U-boats of WWII - uboat.net.
- Helgason, Guðmundur. "U-1279". German U-boats of WWII - uboat.net.
