= SS De la Salle =

1921 British/French Cargo Liner

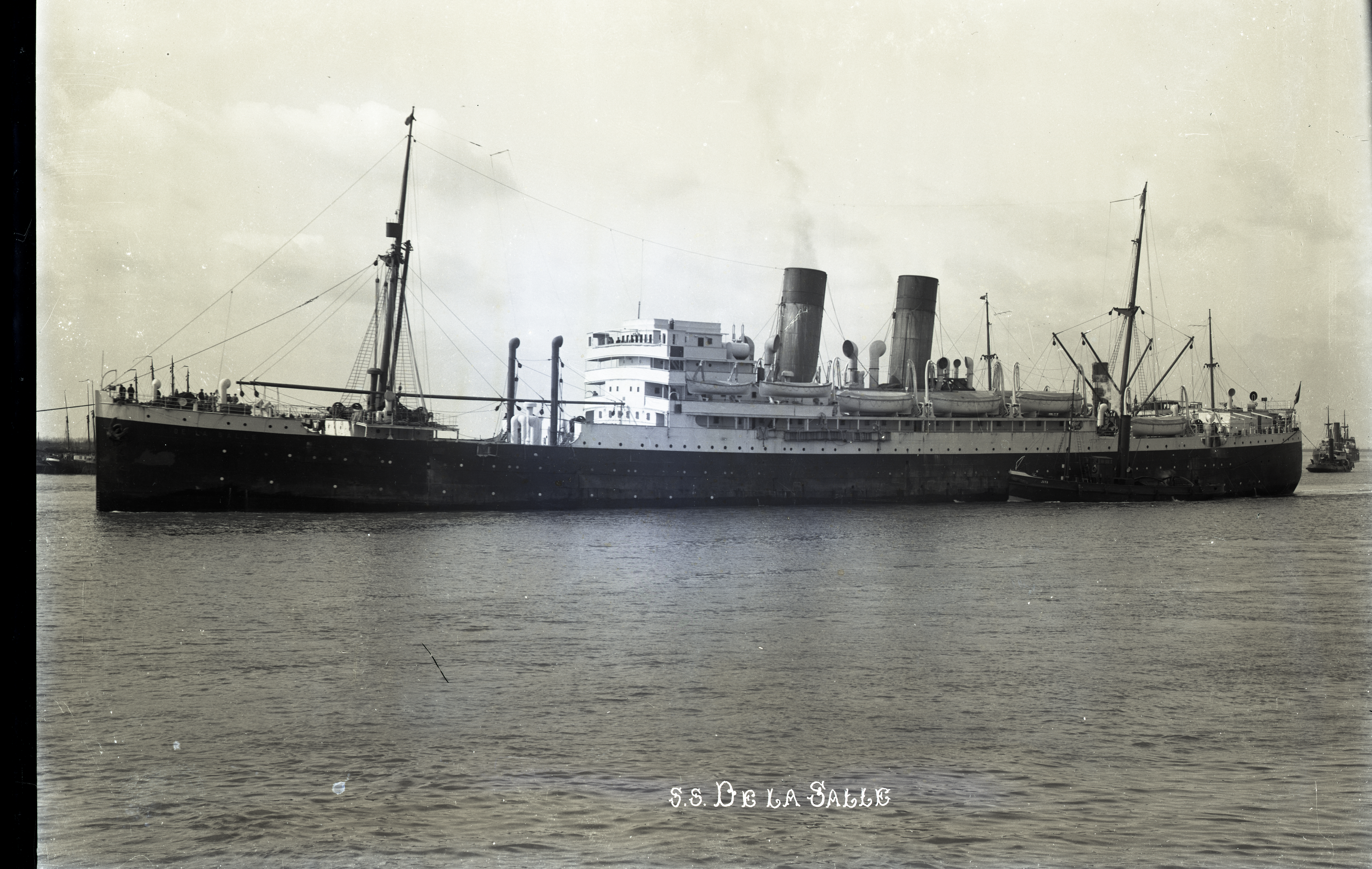
- De La Salle before World War II

History
- Name: (France) De La Salle (1921–1940); (Nazi Germany) H-17 (1940–1941); (France) De La Salle (1941–1942); (United Kingdom of Great Britain and Ireland) De La Salle (1942–1943)
- Owner: Compagnie Générale Transatlantique (French Line) (1921–1940); Kriegsmarine (1940–1941); Compagnie Générale Transatlantique (French Line) (1941–1942); Ministry of War Transport/Elder Dempster Lines (1942–1943)
- Port of registry: Le Havre, France; (United Kingdom of Great Britain and Ireland) London, United Kingdom
- Builder: Barclay Curle
- Yard number: 582
- Laid down: 1921
- Launched: 2 September 1921
- Completed: October 1921
- In service: 1921
- Out of service: 9 July 1943
- Identification: Official number: 144256; Call sign: FNRS
- Fate: Torpedoed and sunk on 9 July 1943

General characteristics
- Type: Cargo liner
- Tonnage: 8,400 GRT
- Length: 139.9 metres (459 ft 0 in)
- Beam: 17.3 metres (56 ft 9 in)
- Depth: 10.5 metres (34 ft 5 in)
- Installed power: Two 3 cyl. triple expansion steam engines
- Propulsion: Two screws
- Speed: 13 knots
- Notes: Two Masts and two funnels

SS De La Salle was a French/British Cargo liner that was torpedoed and sunk on 9 July 1943 by the German submarine U-508 in the Gulf of Benin 60 nautical miles (110 km) south west of Lagos, Nigeria, while she was travelling in Convoy ST 71 from Liverpool, United Kingdom to East London, South Africa with 1,340 tons of general and 763 tons of government cargo aboard, resulting in the loss of ten lives.

== Construction ==
De La Salle was laid down at the Barclay Curle Clydeholm shipyard in Glasgow, Scotland, United Kingdom in 1921 and was launched on 2 September 1921 before being completed in October 1921. The ship was 139.9 metres (459 ft 0 in) long, had a beam of 17.3 metres (56 ft 9 in) and a depth of 10.5 metres (34 ft 5 in). She was assessed at 8,400 GRT and had two 3 cyl. triple expansion steam engines producing 4,900 HP and driving two screw propellers that could achieve a speed of 13 knots (24 km/h; 15 mph). The ship had accommodation for passengers and could also carry cargo.

== Career & Loss ==
De La Salle was used as a cargo liner by the Compagnie Générale Transatlantique from 1921 until the invasion of France by German troops in June 1940. Following the occupation of France by the victorious German troops, De La Salle was requisitioned by the Kriegsmarine on 5 August 1940 and renamed H-17. The ship was intented to be used as a transport ship in the planned German invasion of the United Kingdom, but following the German loss in the Battle of Britain, the invasion was postponed indefinitely, and H-17 was returned to the Compagnie Générale Transatlantique on 28 October 1941 and renamed to her original name of De La Salle. The ship was captured by the British in North Africa in November 1942 and handed over to the Ministry of War Transport which allocated the ship to the Elder Dempster Lines for use as a cargo liner.

De La Salle departed Liverpool, United Kingdom as part of Convoy ST 71 for East London, South Africa via Freetown and Walvis Bay with 1,340 tons of general cargo, 763 tons of government cargo and 249 passengers and crew under the command of captain J. Le Mancheewere. On 9 July 1943 at 2.43 a.m., while the convoy was sailing in the Gulf of Benin 60 nautical miles (110 km) south west of Lagos, Nigeria, De La Salle was torpedoed alongside another British cargo vessel named Manchester Citizen by the German submarine U-508. De La Salle was ultimately sunk by a coup de grâce from U-508 at 4.25 a.m., followed by Manchester Citizen a half hour later. Of her 249 passengers and crew, eight crew and two passengers lost their lives in the sinking while the 239 survivors which included captain Le Mancheewere, 129 crew members, 12 gunners and 97 passengers were rescued by the French corvette Commandant Detroyat and landed at Lagos, Nigeria.

== Wreck ==
The wreck of De La Salle lies at 5°50′N 2°20′E, but the current condition of the wreck is unknown.
