= SS Empire Cromwell =

World War II merchant ship of the United Kingdom

History
- Name: Empire Cromwell
- Owner: Ministry of War Transport
- Operator: Lambert Brothers Ltd
- Port of registry: London, United Kingdom
- Builder: William Pickersgill & Sons Ltd
- Launched: 8 July 1941
- Completed: September 1941
- Out of service: 28 November 1942
- Identification: United Kingdom Official Number 168920; Code Letters BCNW
- Fate: Torpedoed and sunk

General characteristics
- Type: Cargo ship
- Tonnage: 5,970 GRT
- Length: 401 ft 0 in (122.22 m)
- Beam: 54 ft 0 in (16.46 m)
- Depth: 33 ft 2 in (10.11 m)
- Propulsion: Triple expansion steam engine
- Complement: 40 + 9 DEMS gunners.

Location of the sinking of Empire Cromwell.

Empire Cromwell was a 5,970 GRT cargo ship that was built in 1941 by William Pickersgill & Sons Ltd, Sunderland, Co Durham, United Kingdom for the Ministry of War Transport (MoWT). She was torpedoed and sunk off Trinidad on 28 November 1942 by U-508.

== Description ==
Empire Cromwell was built in 1941 by William Pickersgill & Sons Ltd, Sunderland.

Empire Cromwell was 401 feet 0 inches (122.22 m) long, with a beam of 54 feet 0 inches (16.46 m). She had a depth of 33 feet 2 inches (10.11 m). She was assessed at 5,970 GRT, 3,577 NRT.

Empire Cromwell was propelled by a triple expansion steam engine, which had cylinders of 23 1/2 inches (60 cm), 38 inches (97 cm) and 66 inches (170 cm) diameter by 45 inches (110 cm) stroke. The engine was built by George Clark (1938) Ltd, Sunderland.

== History ==
Empire Cromwell was built for the MoWT. The United Kingdom Official Number 168920 and Code Letters BCNW were allocated. Her port of registry was London and she was operated under the management of Lambert Brothers Ltd, London.

Empire Cromer was completed in September 1941. She made her maiden voyage on 20 September, when she joined Convoy EC 75, which had departed Southend, Essex on 18 September and arrived at Loch Ewe on 23 September. From Loch Ewe, she joined Convoy ON 20, which had departed from Liverpool, Lancashire on 25 September and dispersed at sea on 9 October. She then sailed to the Hampton Roads, Virginia, United States and then to Tampa, Florida, arriving on 26 October. Departing Tampa on 30 October, she returned to the Hampton Roads and then sailed to Sydney, Cape Breton, Canada, where she arrived on 9 November. The next day, she joined Convoy SC 54, which arrived at Liverpool on 26 November. Empire Cromwell was carrying a cargo of phosphates. She left the convoy on 27 November at Loch Ewe, joining Convoy WN 211, which departed Oban, Argyllshire that day and arrived at Methil, Fife on 30 November. She then joined Convoy FS662, which departed Methil the next day and arrived at Southend on 3 December. She left the convoy at Immingham, Lincolnshire, arriving on 4 December.

Empire Cromwell departed from Immingham to join Convoy FN583A, which had departed from Southend on 21 December and arrived at Methil on 23 December. She then joined Convoy EN 24, which departed Methil the next day and arrived at Loch Ewe on 28 December. Empire Cromwell was in ballast. She left the convoy at Loch Ewe on 27 December and then sailed to Bermuda, from where she departed on 21 January 1942 for Galveston, Texas, arriving on 28 January. A voyage was made to Houston and back, before Empire Cromwell returned to Houston, departing on 12 February for the Hampton Roads. She then sailed to Halifax, Nova Scotia to join Convoy SC 73, which departed on 6 March and arrived at Liverpool on 24 March. She was the first ship in the convoy to leave port, and was carrying general cargo. She left the convoy on 23 March at the Belfast Lough. Two days later, she joined Convoy BB 153, which arrived at Milford Haven, Pembrokeshire the next day. She then sailed to Swansea, Glamorgan, arriving on 26 March. Empire Cromwell sailed from Swansea to Milford Haven to join Convoy WP 134, which departed on 30 April and arrived at Portsmouth, Hampshire the next day. Her destination was nearby Southampton.

Empire Cromwell departed from Southampton on 17 April to join Convoy PW 142, which departed the next day and arrived at Milford Haven on 19 April. She then made a voyage to Cardiff, Glamorgan and back. On 1 May, she left Milford Haven to join Convoy OS 27, which departed from Liverpool on 2 May and arrived at Freetown, Sierra Leone on 19 May. She was carrying a cargo of stores bound for Suez, Egypt. From Freetown, Empire Cromwell sailed via Durban, South Africa, Lourenço Marques, Mozambique and Aden to Suez, where she arrived on 15 August. She then sailed to Port Said and Haifa, Palestine. Two return voyages were made to Beirut, Syria and the Lebanon before she returned to Port Said, arriving on 19 September. She then sailed to Suez, Aden and Lourenço Marques before arriving on 2 November at Cape Town, South Africa.

Empire Cromwell departed Cape Town on 4 November, for Trinidad and New York, United States. She was carrying 1,000 tons of chrome ore. At 02:17 German time on 28 November, Empire Cromwell was torpedoed and sunk at 9°00′N 58°30′W by U-508, under the command of Georg Staats. Of her crew of 40, plus nine DEMS gunners, 21 crew and 3 DEMS gunners were killed. The 25 survivors were rescued on 30 November by British Motor Torpedo Boats and taken to Port of Spain, Trinidad. Those lost on Empire Cromwell are commemorated at the Tower Hill Memorial, London.
