= German submarine U-462 =

German World War II submarine

Coordinates: 45°33′N 10°58′W

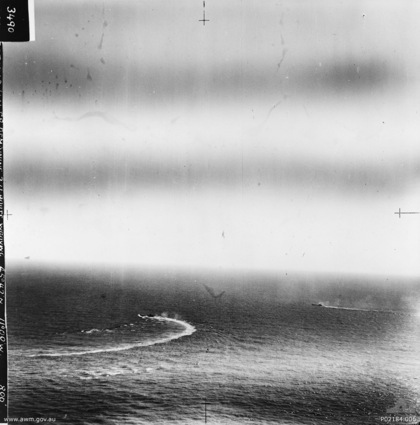
- U-462 and U-461 taking evasive action during an air attack on 30 July 1943

History

Nazi Germany
- Name: U-462
- Ordered: 14 May 1940
- Builder: Deutsche Werke, Kiel
- Yard number: 293
- Laid down: 2 January 1941
- Launched: 29 November 1941
- Commissioned: 5 March 1942
- Fate: Sunk on 30 July 1943

General characteristics
- Class & type: Type XIV ocean-going submarine tanker
- Displacement: 1,688 t (1,661 long tons) surfaced; 1,932 t (1,901 long tons) submerged
- Length: 67.10 m (220 ft 2 in) o/a; 48.51 m (159 ft 2 in) pressure hull
- Beam: 9.35 m (30 ft 8 in) o/a; 4.90 m (16 ft 1 in) pressure hull
- Height: 11.70 m (38 ft 5 in)
- Draught: 6.51 m (21 ft 4 in)
- Installed power: 2,800–3,200 PS (2,100–2,400 kW; 2,800–3,200 bhp) (diesels); 750 PS (550 kW; 740 shp) (electric)
- Propulsion: 2 shafts; 2 × diesel engines; 2 × electric motors
- Speed: 14.4–14.9 knots (26.7–27.6 km/h; 16.6–17.1 mph) surfaced; 6.2 knots (11.5 km/h; 7.1 mph) submerged
- Range: 12,350 nmi (22,870 km; 14,210 mi) at 10 knots (19 km/h; 12 mph) surfaced; 55 nmi (102 km; 63 mi) at 4 knots (7.4 km/h; 4.6 mph) submerged
- Test depth: 240 m (790 ft)
- Complement: 6 officers and 47 enlisted
- Armament: 2 × 3.7 cm (1.5 in) SK C/30 anti-aircraft guns; 1 × 2 cm (0.79 in) C/30 AA gun

Service record
- Part of: 4th U-boat Flotilla; 5 March – 31 July 1942; 10th U-boat Flotilla; 1 August – 31 October 1942; 12th U-boat Flotilla; 1 November 1942 – 30 July 1943
- Identification codes: M 26 839
- Commanders: Lt.z.S. Bruno Vowe; 5 March 1942 – 30 July 1943
- Operations: 8 patrols: 1st patrol: 23 July – 21 September 1942; 2nd patrol: 18 October – 7 December 1942; 3rd patrol: 20 – 22 January 1943; 4th patrol: 19 February – 11 March 1943; 5th patrol: 1 – 24 April 1943; 6th patrol: 17 – 23 June 1943; 7th patrol: 28 June – 6 July 1943; 8th patrol: 27 – 30 July 1943
- Victories: None

German submarine U-462 was a Type XIV supply and replenishment U-boat ("Milchkuh") of Nazi Germany's Kriegsmarine during World War II.

Her keel was laid down on 2 January 1941, by Deutsche Werke in Kiel. She was launched on 29 November 1941 and commissioned on 5 March 1942 with Oberleutnant zur See Bruno Vowe in command. Vowe commanded the boat until she was lost. She served, first as part of the 4th U-boat Flotilla while carrying out training, then as part of the 10th and 12th flotillas while taking part in operations.

== Design ==
German Type XIV submarines were shortened versions of the Type IXDs they were based on.‘’U-462’’ had a displacement of 1,688 tonnes (1,661 long tons) when at the surface and 1,932 tonnes (1,901 long tons) while submerged. The U-boat had a total length of 67.10 m (220 ft 2 in), a pressure hull length of 48.51 m (159 ft 2 in), a beam of 9.35 m (30 ft 8 in), a height of 11.70 m (38 ft 5 in), and a draught of 6.51 m (21 ft 4 in). The submarine was powered by two Germaniawerft supercharged four-stroke, six-cylinder diesel engines producing a total of 2,800–3,200 metric horsepower (2,060–2,350 kW; 2,760–3,160 shp) for use while surfaced, two Siemens-Schuckert 2 GU 345/38-8 double-acting electric motors producing a total of 750 metric horsepower (550 kW; 740 shp) for use while submerged. She had two shafts and two propellers. The boat was capable of operating at depths of up to 240 metres (790 ft).

The submarine had a maximum surface speed of 14.4–14.9 knots (26.7–27.6 km/h; 16.6–17.1 mph) and a maximum submerged speed of 6.2 knots (11.5 km/h; 7.1 mph). When submerged, the boat could operate for 120 nautical miles (220 km; 140 mi) at 2 knots (3.7 km/h; 2.3 mph); when surfaced, she could travel 12,350 nautical miles (22,870 km; 14,210 mi) at 10 knots (19 km/h; 12 mph). ‘’U-462’’ was not fitted with torpedo tubes or deck guns, but had two 3.7 cm (1.5 in) SK C/30 anti-aircraft guns with 2500 rounds as well as a 2 cm (0.79 in) C/30 guns with 3000 rounds. The boat had a complement of fifty-three.

== Operational career ==
U-462 conducted eight patrols. As a supply boat, she avoided combat.

=== First patrol ===
For her first patrol, U-462 departed Kiel on 23 July 1942 and arrived at St. Nazaire in occupied France on 21 September of the same year, having travelled by way of the gap between Iceland and the Faeroe Islands and out into the Atlantic. The latter part of the voyage took her past the Azores on her way to her new base.

=== Second and third patrols ===
The U-boat's second effort took her to a point west-southwest of the Cape Verde Islands which she reached on 9 November 1942. She arrived back at St. Nazaire on 7 December 1942.

Her third outing was very short. She left Bordeaux on 20 January 1943, but returned on the 22nd.

=== Fourth and fifth patrols ===
The submarine's fourth sortie took her out into the Atlantic once again. The most westerly spot of this patrol was recorded on 27 February 1943. She returned to France, but this time it was to Bordeaux, on 11 March.

The boat's fifth patrol was also routine.

=== Sixth patrol ===
She did not leave the Bay of Biscay, being attacked by Mosquito aircraft of 151 and 156 squadrons, RAF on 21 June 1943. One man was killed (Matrosengefreiter Ferdinand Brunnbaur), and four more were wounded. The patrol was aborted, the boat returned to Bordeaux on the 23rd.

=== Seventh patrol ===
U-462's seventh patrol was also cut short. She had barely cleared the northwest Spanish coast when she was attacked by a British B-24 Liberator of 224 squadron, RAF. After sustaining sufficient damage to force a return, she entered Bordeaux harbour on 6 July 1943.

=== Loss ===
On 30 July 1943, U-462 was sunk by a British Halifax bomber of 502 Squadron RAF and gunfire from the British Black Swan-class sloops HMS Wren, Kite, Woodpecker, Wild Goose and Woodcock, in the Bay of Biscay. One of these ships, Kite, registered a hit at 13,050 yd (11,930 m). One crewman was killed; the other 64 survived.

=== Wolfpacks ===
U-462 took part in one wolfpack, namely:

- Lohs (29 August – 2 September 1942)

== Bibliography ==
- Busch, Rainer; Röll, Hans-Joachim (1999). German U-boat commanders of World War II : a biographical dictionary. Translated by Brooks, Geoffrey. London, Annapolis, Md: Greenhill Books, Naval Institute Press. ISBN 1-55750-186-6.
- Busch, Rainer; Röll, Hans-Joachim (1999). Deutsche U-Boot-Verluste von September 1939 bis Mai 1945 [German U-boat losses from September 1939 to May 1945]. Der U-Boot-Krieg (in German). Vol. IV. Hamburg, Berlin, Bonn: Mittler. ISBN 3-8132-0514-2.
- Edwards, Bernard (1996). Dönitz and the Wolf Packs – The U-boats at War. Cassell Military Classics. pp. 103, 153, 154. ISBN 0-304-35203-9.
- Gröner, Erich; Jung, Dieter; Maass, Martin (1991). U-boats and Mine Warfare Vessels. German Warships 1815–1945. Vol. 2. Translated by Thomas, Keith; Magowan, Rachel. London: Conway Maritime Press. ISBN 0-85177-593-4.
- Kemp, Paul (1999). U-Boats Destroyed – German Submarine Losses in the World Wars. London: Arms & Armour. ISBN 1-85409-515-3.
