= HMS Woodcock (U90) =

Modified Black Swan-class sloop

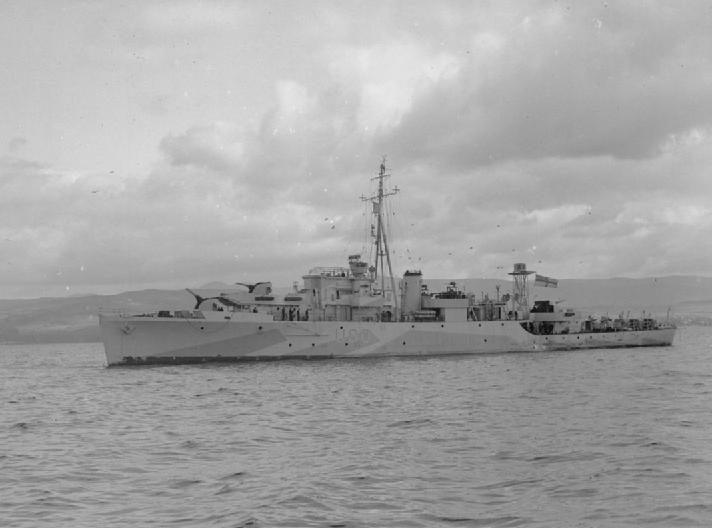
- HMS Woodcock in June 1943

History

United Kingdom
- Name: Woodcock
- Namesake: Woodcock
- Ordered: 13 April 1940
- Builder: Fairfield Shipbuilding and Engineering, Govan
- Laid down: 21 October 1941
- Launched: 26 November 1942
- Commissioned: 29 May 1943
- Identification: Pennant number: U08
- Fate: Scrapped 28 November 1955

General characteristics
- Class & type: Modified Black Swan-class sloop
- Displacement: 1,350 tons
- Length: 283 ft (86 m)
- Beam: 38.5 ft (11.7 m)
- Propulsion: Geared turbines; two shafts
- Speed: 20 knots (37 km/h) at 4,300 hp (3,200 kW)
- Complement: 192 men
- Armament: 6 × QF 4 in Mk XVI anti-aircraft guns; 12 × 20 mm anti-aircraft guns

HMS Woodcock was built by Fairfields at Govan; laid down on 21 October 1941, launched on 26 November 1942, and completed 29 May 1943. She was the fifth Royal Naval vessel to carry this name.

== Construction and design ==
Woodcock was one of two Modified Black Swan-class sloops ordered by the Admiralty on 18 July 1941 as part of the 1940 Supplemental War Programme. The Modified Black Swans were an improved version of the pre-war Black Swan-class sloops, with greater beam, allowing a heavier close-in anti-aircraft armament to be accommodated.

Woodcock was 299 ft 6 in (91.29 m) long overall and 283 ft 0 in (86.26 m) between perpendiculars, with a beam of 38 feet 6 inches (11.73 m) and a draught of 11 ft 4 in (3.45 m) at deep load. Displacement of the Modified Black Swans was 1,350–1,490 long tons (1,370–1,510 t) standard and 1,880–1,950 long tons (1,910–1,980 t) deep load depending on the armament and equipment fitted. Two Admiralty three-drum water-tube boilers provided steam to Parsons geared steam turbines which drove two shafts. The machinery was rated at 4,300 shaft horsepower (3,200 kW), giving a speed of 19.75 knots (36.58 km/h; 22.73 mph).

The ship's main gun armament (as fitted to all the Modified Black Swans) consisted of 3 twin QF 4-inch (102 mm) Mk XVI guns, in dual purpose mounts, capable of both anti-ship and anti-aircraft use. Close-in anti-aircraft armament varied between the ships of the class, with Woodcock completing with an outfit of 2 twin 40 mm Bofors guns (in stabilised Mark IV Hazemayer mounts), supplemented by 2 twin and 2 single Oerlikon 20 mm cannon. Anti-submarine armament consisted of a split Hedgehog anti-submarine mortar, mounted either side of the 'B' 4-inch mount, together with 110 depth charges. The ship had a complement of 192 officers and other ranks.

Woodcock was laid down at Fairfield's Govan shipyard on 21 October 1941. She was launched on 29 November 1942 and completed on 29 May 1942. She was the fifth ship called Woodcock to serve with the Royal Navy.

== Service history ==
After commissioning and working up, Woodcock joined the 2nd Escort Group, and was operational with by 23 July, when she left Falmouth as part of the group for anti submarine operations in the Bay of Biscay. The group was assigned to Operation Musketry, a joint operation between the Royal Navy and RAF Coastal Command to stop German U-boats from transiting the Bay of Biscay. On 30 July 1943, a group of three U-boats, U-504 and the tanker submarines U-461 and U-462 were spotted by an RAF aircraft. The submarines came under attack by seven aircraft (Note: A Catalina of 210 Squadron RAF, two Halifaxes of 502 Squadron RAF, Sunderlands from 228 Squadron RAF and 461 Squadron RAAF, and Liberators from 53 Squadron RAF and the 19th Antisubmarine Squadron USAAF.) while the five sloops of the 2nd Escort Group (Note: Kite, Wild Goose, Woodcock, Woodpecker and Wren.) were called up. The U-boats stayed on the surface with the intention of fighting off the air attacks with their anti-aircraft guns. U-462 was hit by a bomb from a Halifax of Halifax of 502 Squadron and badly damaged, being unable to dive, while as the sloops of the 2nd Escort group arrived on the scene, U-461 was sunk by a Sunderland flying boat of 461 Squadron RAAF. The five sloops opened fire on U-462 at a range of about 6.5 nmi (7.5 mi; 12.0 km), and after a shell from Kite hit the submarine, U-462's commanding officer ordered her to be scuttled and abandoned ship. U-504 dived to escape the oncoming ships, but was soon detected by Kite, and Kite, Wren, Woodpecker and Wild Goose carried out a series of depth charge attacks, sinking the submarine. U-462's sinking was credited to the Halifax and all five sloops.

Early on 6 November 1943, the 2nd Escort Group was operating with the escort carrier Tracker east-south-east of Newfoundland when Kite spotted the German submarine U-226, which was preparing to attack Tracker. Kite attacked immediately, forcing the submarine to break off the attack on Tracker, with Kite, Starling and Woodcock continuing to stay in contact with the submarine through the remainder of the night. After dawn, Woodcock carried out a creeping attack on the submarine, which was successful, sinking U-226 with all hands. A few hours later, Starling, Magpie and Wild Goose sank U-842. The weather during this operation was extremely poor, with very heavy seas, and the patrol was aborted, with the escort group putting into Argentia on 12 November. The heavy seas had caused significant damage to Woodcock with her forward guns jammed at maximum elevation and ready-use ammunition lockers torn from their mountings. The damage was severe enough to make Woodcock unfit for combat, and she was sent home to the UK for repair.

Woodcock arrived at Dundee on 4 December 1943, and was under repair there until 21 January 1944, when she joined the 7th Escort Group based at Belfast, carrying out convoy escort duties in the North Atlantic and onto Gibraltar until 21 April 1944, when persistent problems with the motors of the ship's Bofors mounts, resulted in the ship being repaired at Belfast. After repair, Woodcock carried out local escort work based out of the Clyde before transferring to Portsmouth in preparation for the upcoming Allied invasion of Normandy. On 27 May 1944, Woodcock was escorting a convoy when she collided with the destroyer Venus in thick fog off St Alban's Head. Woodcock suffered flooding of two compartments, and put into Portsmouth for emergency repairs. On 6 June 1944, Woodcock made passage to Hull for more permanent repairs, which continued until 7 August that year. While Woodcock returned to convoy escort duty, further repair was required, and on 16 September she arrived at Liverpool for repair and modification to prepare the ship for service in the Pacific.

Woodcock left for the Pacific on 22 December 1944, and on 2 January 1945 the sloop had a minor collision with the corvette Bergamot, but continued on her journey via Colombo and Darwin, and arrived at the British Pacific Fleet bases at Manus Island on 5 March 1945. Woodcock, like other sloops serving with the British Pacific Fleet, was employed escorting the replenishment ships of the Fleet Train which supplied the front line warships of the fleet with fuel, weapons and other stores. During the Invasion of Okinawa, Woodcock escorted the replenishment force when it resupplied the fleet on 10 May 1945 and on 14 May. During the Allied naval attacks on Japan in July–August 1945, Woodcock escorted the replenishment force when it resupplied the fleet on 31 July – 1 August 1945. Woodcock was present in Tokyo Bay when the Formal ceremony of surrender of Japan took place on 2 September 1945.

Woodcock remained as part of the British Pacific Fleet until late 1946, when she returned to the UK. Woodcock was laid up in reserve at Harwich on 10 December 1946, and moved to Chatham Dockyard in late 1948. Woodcock was transferred to Hartlepool in mid-1953. Woodcock never returned to active service, and on 28 November 1955 was towed to Rosyth by the tug Superman to be scrapped by Shipbuilding Industries Ltd.

== Pennant numbers ==
Pennant number	From	To
U90	1943	1947
F90	1947	-

== Battle honours ==
The following battle honours were awarded to the sloop Woodcock.

- Atlantic 1939–45
- English Channel 1939–45
- Okinawa 1945

== See also ==
- Black Swan-class
