= Japanese destroyer Yūnagi =

Two destroyers of the Imperial Japanese Navy were named Yūnagi:

- Japanese destroyer Yūnagi (1906), a Kamikaze-class destroyer launched in 1906 and scrapped in 1924
- Japanese destroyer Yūnagi (1924), a Kamikaze-class destroyer launched in 1924 and sunk in 1944
