= German submarine U-508 =

German World War II submarine

Coordinates: 46°00′N 7°30′W

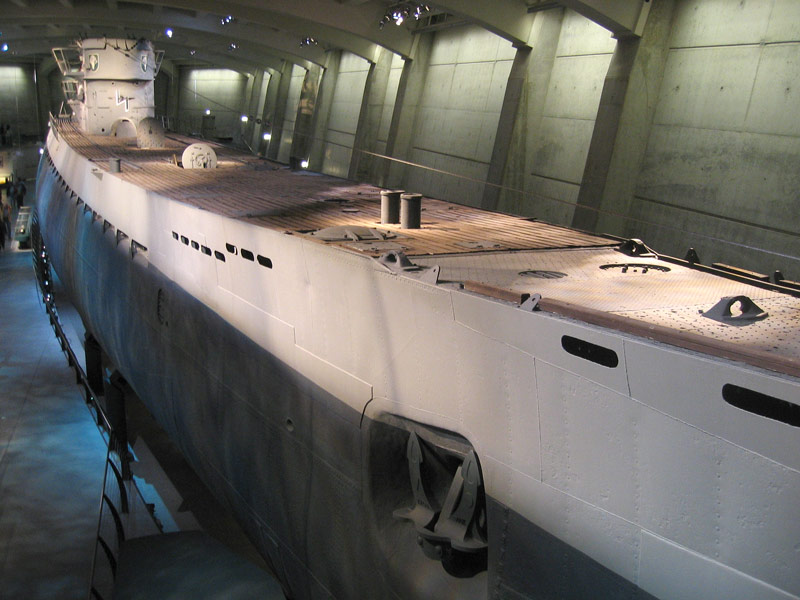
- U-505, a typical Type IXC boat

History

Nazi Germany
- Name: U-508
- Ordered: 20 October 1939
- Builder: Deutsche Werft, Hamburg
- Yard number: 304
- Laid down: 24 September 1940
- Launched: 30 July 1941
- Commissioned: 20 October 1941
- Fate: Sunk on 12 November 1943 in the Bay of Biscay by a US aircraft

General characteristics
- Class & type: Type IXC submarine
- Displacement: 1,120 t (1,100 long tons) surfaced; 1,232 t (1,213 long tons) submerged
- Length: 76.76 m (251 ft 10 in) o/a; 58.75 m (192 ft 9 in) pressure hull
- Beam: 6.76 m (22 ft 2 in) o/a; 4.40 m (14 ft 5 in) pressure hull
- Height: 9.60 m (31 ft 6 in)
- Draught: 4.70 m (15 ft 5 in)
- Installed power: 4,400 PS (3,200 kW; 4,300 bhp) (diesels); 1,000 PS (740 kW; 990 shp) (electric)
- Propulsion: 2 shafts; 2 × diesel engines; 2 × electric motors
- Speed: 18.2 knots (33.7 km/h; 20.9 mph) surfaced; 7.3 knots (13.5 km/h; 8.4 mph) submerged
- Range: 13,450 nmi (24,910 km; 15,480 mi) at 10 knots (19 km/h; 12 mph) surfaced; 64 nmi (119 km; 74 mi) at 4 knots (7.4 km/h; 4.6 mph) submerged
- Test depth: 230 m (750 ft)
- Complement: 4 officers, 44 enlisted
- Armament: 6 × torpedo tubes (4 bow, 2 stern); 22 × 53.3 cm (21 in) torpedoes; 1 × 10.5 cm (4.1 in) SK C/32 deck gun (180 rounds); 1 × 3.7 cm (1.5 in) SK C/30 AA gun; 1 × twin 2 cm FlaK 30 AA guns

Service record
- Part of: 4th U-boat Flotilla 20 October 1941 – 30 June 1942; 10th U-boat Flotilla 1 July 1942 – 12 November 1943
- Identification codes: M 36 926
- Commanders: Oblt.z.S. / Kptlt. Georg Staats; 20 October 1941 – 12 November 1943
- Operations: 6 patrols: 1st patrol: 25 June – 15 September 1942; 2nd patrol: 17 October 1942 – 6 January 1943; 3rd patrol: 22 February – 15 March 1943; 4th patrol: 29 – 31 May 1943; 5th patrol: a. 7 June – 14 September 1943 b. 1 – 3 November 1943; 6th patrol: 9 – 12 November 1943
- Victories: 14 merchant ships sunk (74,087 GRT)

German submarine U-508 was a Type IXC U-boat of Nazi Germany's Kriegsmarine during World War II.

She was laid down at the Deutsche Werft yard in Hamburg as yard number 304 on 24 September 1940, launched on 30 July 1941 and commissioned on 20 October with Oberleutnant zur See Georg Staats in command.

U-508 began her service career with training as part of the 4th U-boat Flotilla from 20 October 1941. She was reassigned to the 10th flotilla for operations on 1 July 1942.

She carried out six patrols and sank 14 ships. She was sunk by an American aircraft on 12 November 1943.

== Design ==
German Type IXC submarines were slightly larger than the original Type IXBs. U-508 had a displacement of 1,120 tonnes (1,100 long tons) when at the surface and 1,232 tonnes (1,213 long tons) while submerged. The U-boat had a total length of 76.76 m (251 ft 10 in), a pressure hull length of 58.75 m (192 ft 9 in), a beam of 6.76 m (22 ft 2 in), a height of 9.60 m (31 ft 6 in), and a draught of 4.70 m (15 ft 5 in). The submarine was powered by two MAN M 9 V 40/46 supercharged four-stroke, nine-cylinder diesel engines producing a total of 4,400 metric horsepower (3,240 kW; 4,340 shp) for use while surfaced, two Siemens-Schuckert 2 GU 345/34 double-acting electric motors producing a total of 1,000 shaft horsepower (1,010 PS; 750 kW) for use while submerged. She had two shafts and two 1.92 m (6 ft) propellers. The boat was capable of operating at depths of up to 230 metres (750 ft).

The submarine had a maximum surface speed of 18.3 knots (33.9 km/h; 21.1 mph) and a maximum submerged speed of 7.3 knots (13.5 km/h; 8.4 mph). When submerged, the boat could operate for 63 nautical miles (117 km; 72 mi) at 4 knots (7.4 km/h; 4.6 mph); when surfaced, she could travel 13,450 nautical miles (24,910 km; 15,480 mi) at 10 knots (19 km/h; 12 mph). U-508 was fitted with six 53.3 cm (21 in) torpedo tubes (four fitted at the bow and two at the stern), 22 torpedoes, one 10.5 cm (4.13 in) SK C/32 naval gun, 180 rounds, and a 3.7 cm (1.5 in) SK C/30 as well as a 2 cm (0.79 in) C/30 anti-aircraft gun. The boat had a complement of forty-eight.

== Service history ==
=== First patrol ===
The boat departed Kiel on 30 July 1942, moved through the North Sea and negotiated the 'gap' between Iceland and the Faroe Islands. She sailed close to the west coast of Ireland in a southerly direction, then turned southwest toward Cuba.

She sank the Manzanillo on 12 August 1942 in the Straits of Florida.

She entered Lorient, on the French Atlantic coast, (which was to be her base for most of the rest of her career), on 15 September 1942.

=== Second patrol ===
U-508's second foray took her to the waters off South America. The pickings were rich. This sortie, while not the boat's longest, was her most successful. Some, but not all of her victims are shown below:

She sank the City of Corinth north of Trinidad on 17 November 1942.

Ten days later, she sank the Clan Mcfayden 95 nautical miles (176 km; 109 mi) east of Galeota Point, Trinidad.

She went on to sink the Solon II on 3 December northeast of Georgetown, British Guiana. The ship went down in twenty seconds.

The Nigerian, which was sunk on 9 December, had among her passengers, four British Army officers. They were taken prisoner and landed at Lorient on the submarine's return.

=== Third, fourth and fifth patrols ===
On her third patrol, the boat was attacked by a British B-24 Liberator of No. 224 Squadron RAF and seriously damaged.

Her fourth sortie was relatively uneventful and short, lasting just three days.

Patrol number five, at 100 days the longest, saw the U-boat steam as far as the west African coast. In the Gulf of Guinea, she sank the Manchester Citizen on 9 July 1943. She then sank the Incomati on the 18th, 200 nautical miles (370 km; 230 mi) south of Lagos in Nigeria. She returned to Lorient on 14 September.

=== Sixth patrol and loss ===
Having moved from Lorient to St. Nazaire, U-508 departed for her sixth and what turned out to be her final patrol on 9 November. On the 12th, while still on the outward leg, she was sunk by a US Navy PB4Y-1 Liberator of VB-103 in the Bay of Biscay.

Fifty-seven men died; there were no survivors.

== Summary of raiding history ==
Date	Name	Nationality	Tonnage (GRT)	Fate
12 August 1942	Manzanillo	Cuba	1,025	Sunk
12 August 1942	Santiago de Cuba	Cuba	1,685	Sunk
7 November 1942	Lindenhall	United Kingdom	5,248	Sunk
7 November 1942	Nathaniel Hawthorne	United States	7,176	Sunk
17 November 1942	City of Corinth	United Kingdom	5,318	Sunk
27 November 1942	Clan Macfadyen	United Kingdom	6,191	Sunk
28 November 1942	Empire Cromwell	United Kingdom	5,970	Sunk
1 December 1942	Trevalgan	United Kingdom	5,299	Sunk
2 December 1942	City of Bath	United Kingdom	5,079	Sunk
3 December 1942	Solon II	United Kingdom	4,561	Sunk
9 December 1942	Nigerian	United Kingdom	5,423	Sunk
9 July 1943	De La Salle	United Kingdom	8,400	Sunk
9 July 1943	Manchester Citizen	United Kingdom	5,343	Sunk
18 July 1943	Incomati	United Kingdom	7,369	Sunk

== Bibliography ==
- Busch, Rainer; Röll, Hans-Joachim (1999). German U-boat commanders of World War II: a biographical dictionary. Translated by Brooks, Geoffrey. London, Annapolis, Md: Greenhill Books, Naval Institute Press. ISBN 1-55750-186-6.
- Busch, Rainer; Röll, Hans-Joachim (1999). Deutsche U-Boot-Verluste von September 1939 bis Mai 1945 [German U-boat losses from September 1939 to May 1945]. Der U-Boot-Krieg (in German). Vol. IV. Hamburg, Berlin, Bonn: Mittler. ISBN 3-8132-0514-2.
- Gröner, Erich (1985). Die deutschen Kriegsschiffe 1815–1945 / 3, U-Boote, Hilfskreuzer, Minenschiffe, Netzleger, Sperrbrecher (in German). Koblenz: Bernard & Graefe. ISBN 3-7637-4802-4. OCLC 310610321.
- Gröner, Erich; Jung, Dieter; Maass, Martin (1991). U-boats and Mine Warfare Vessels. German Warships 1815–1945. Vol. 2. Translated by Thomas, Keith; Magowan, Rachel. London: Conway Maritime Press. ISBN 0-85177-593-4.
- Kemp, Paul (1999). U-Boats Destroyed - German Submarine Losses in the World Wars. London: Arms & Armour. ISBN 1-85409-515-3.
