= HMS Wild Goose =

Sloop of the Royal Navy

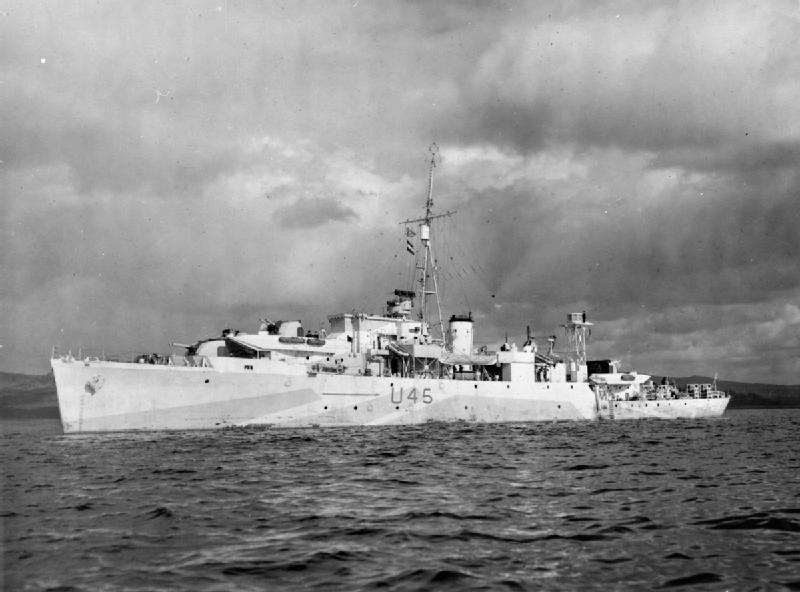
- HMS Wild Goose in April 1943

History

United Kingdom
- Name: HMS Wild Goose
- Ordered: 13 April 1940
- Builder: Yarrow Shipbuilders
- Yard number: 1762
- Laid down: 28 January 1942
- Launched: 14 October 1942
- Commissioned: 11 March 1943
- Decommissioned: 1955
- Identification: Pennant number U45/F45
- Motto: Alert to evil
- Honours and awards: Atlantic 1943–44; Biscay 1943; Normandy 1944; Arctic 1944; English Channel 1945
- Fate: Scrapped 26 February 1956
- Badge: On a field white, a Wild Goose in Flight Proper

General characteristics
- Class & type: Black Swan-class sloop

HMS Wild Goose, pennant number U45, was a Black Swan-class sloop of the Royal Navy. She was one of several ships of that class that took part in the famous "six in one trip" in 1943 (in which six U-boats were sunk in one patrol).

== Service history ==
She was built at Yarrow shipyards in Scotstoun, Glasgow. She was launched on 14 October 1942. She was adopted by the civil community of Worsley, Lancashire, as part of the Warship Week savings campaign in 1942.

On 22 May 1943, she was deployed on her first mission along with fellow sloops Wren, Woodpecker, Cygnet, Starling and Kite on anti-submarine operations supporting the outward passage of Atlantic Convoy ONS 8.

On 18 December 1943, she was taken in hand for repair in Liverpool, redeploying at the end of January 1944.

On 31 January 1944, she sank U-592 with Starling and Magpie, and later joined Woodpecker and Kite, taking part in the sinking of the German submarines U-762 (8 February 1944), U-238 & U-734 (9 February 1944), U-424 (11 February 1944) and U-653 (15 March 1944)

At the end of May 1944, she returned to Liverpool for more repairs, whilst here she was selected to take part in Operation Neptune to prevent U-Boat attacks on the D-Day invasion convoys. On 1 July 1944, she was released from Neptune and dispatched to Belfast for refit, completing in September 1944.

During February and March 1945, she was deployed to the English Channel, taking part in the sinking of U-1279 by the frigate Labuan, Loch Fada and sinking U-683 herself. Following VE Day, on 6 May 1945, she was nominated for transfer to the British Pacific Fleet following her second refit. By the time the refit had completed in September 1945 the Japanese had surrendered and Wild Goose was therefore surplus to requirements and was Paid off and reduced to reserve status.

She was later recommissioned in 1946 and deployed to the Persian Gulf, spending the rest of her service career in the Middle East before finally decommissioning in 1955.

Wild Goose was sold for breaking up in February 1956, and arrived at the breakers at Bo’ness on the Firth of Forth near Edinburgh on 26 February 1956.

== Today ==
The ship's badge was saved from the breakers yard and donated to Liverpool National Maritime Museum.

== Publications ==
- Colledge, J. J.; Warlow, Ben (2006) [1969]. Ships of the Royal Navy: The Complete Record of All Fighting Ships of the Royal Navy from the 15th Century to the Present (3rd Rev ed.). London: Chatham Publishing. ISBN 978-1-86176-281-8. OCLC 67375475.
- Hague, Arnold (1993). Sloops: A History of the 71 Sloops Built in Britain and Australia for the British, Australian and Indian Navies 1926–1946. Kendal, England: World Ship Society. ISBN 0-905617-67-3.
