= List of shipwrecks in August 1944 =

The list of shipwrecks in August 1944 includes ships sunk, foundered, grounded, or otherwise lost during August 1944.

== 1 August ==
List of shipwrecks: 1 August 1944
Ship	State	Description
Seia Maru	Japan	World War II: The ammunition transporter (6,659 GRT) was bombed and sunk in the Banda Sea 20km east of northern entrance of Chapalulu (Tjapaloeloe) Strait, Sula Islands, Netherlands Indies (1°46′S 125°35′E), by Consolidated PBY Catalina aircraft of the United States Navy. 41 passengers and 22 crewmen were killed.
TK-334	Soviet Navy	World War II: The G-5-class motor torpedo boat was sunk by a mine with all hands in the Dniester estuary.

== 2 August ==
List of shipwrecks: 2 August 1944
Ship	State	Description
DC 10 Schwan	Kriegsmarine	World War II: The guard ship struck a mine and sank in the North Sea off Eiderstedt, Schleswig-Holstein.
FH 02 Orne	Kriegsmarine	World War II: The harbour protection vessel was sunk at Le Havre, Seine-Inférieure, France in an air raid by aircraft of Bomber Command, Royal Air Force.
USS Fiske	United States Navy	USS Fiske World War II: The Edsall-class destroyer escort was torpedoed and sunk in the Atlantic Ocean (47°11′N 33°29′W) by U-804 ( Kriegsmarine) with the loss of 33 of her 209 crew.
Garibaldi	Italy	World War II: The cargo ship was sunk in an Allied air raid on Genoa.
Kondor	Kriegsmarine	World War II: The torpedo boat was destroyed at Le Havre in an air raid by aircraft of Bomber Command.
Konei Maru	Imperial Japanese Army	World War II: The cargo ship was torpedoed and sunk in the Pacific Ocean 1 nautical mile (1.9 km) south of Kukizaki, south west of Nagoya (33°37′N 136°20′E) by USS Tautog (United States Navy). 11 crew were killed.
KT 20	Kriegsmarine	World War II: The landing craft was sunk in an Allied air raid on Genoa.
M 3144	Kriegsmarine	World War II: The minesweeper (110 GRT) was bombed and sunk at Vergi, Lithuania in a Soviet air raid. She was raised on 11 August 1944, repaired and resumed service.
M 4430 Sopot	Kriegsmarine	World War II: The minesweeper struck a mine and sank in the English Channel off Le Havre.
Maas	Germany	World War II: The coaster was set afire at Le Havre in an air raid by aircraft of Bomber Command.
MAL 16	Kriegsmarine	World War II: The MAL 1A type landing fire support lighter was bombed and heavily damaged by Soviet aircraft off Emajõgi estuary in Lake Peipus, Estonia. She was towed along the Emajõgi river by MAL 24 but was grounded 12 km of Tartu and became a total loss after the explosion of her ammunition. One crew was killed and 6 wounded.
NT 28 Planet	Kriegsmarine	World War II: The net tender was sunk at Le Havre in an air raid by aircraft of Bomber Command.
RA 257	Kriegsmarine	World War II: The RA 251-class minesweeper, a former VAS 301-class submarine chaser, was sunk in Genoa Bay by Allied aircraft.
S 39	Kriegsmarine	World War II: The Type 1939/40 motor torpedo boat was sunk at Le Havre in an air raid by aircraft of Bomber Command.
S 114	Kriegsmarine	World War II: The Type 1939/40 motor torpedo boat was sunk at Le Havre in an air raid by aircraft of Bomber Command.
Wilhelm A. Reidemann	Germany	World War II: The tanker was gutted by fire in an Allied air raid on Nantes, Loire-Inferieure, France.

== 3 August ==
List of shipwrecks: 3 August 1944
Ship	State	Description
Elisabeth Dal	United Kingdom	World War II: Convoy HX 300: The cargo ship (4,258 GRT, 1910) collided with Jacksonville (United States) in the Rviver Mersey and was beached. Elisabeth Dal was declared a total loss and consequently scrapped.
HMT Gairsay	Royal Navy	World War II: The naval trawler (545/770 t, 1943) was sunk in the English Channel by a Kriegsmarine Marder midget submarine. 31 crew were killed.
HMS LCG(L) 764	Royal Navy	World War II: The landing craft tank (350/570 t, 1943) was sunk in the English Channel by a Kriegsmarine Marder midget submarine. Eight crew were killed. There were 27 survivors.
Pascoli	Italy	World War II: The cargo ship was torpedoed and damaged at La Ciotat, Var, France by French submarine Curie (Free French Naval Forces). She was consequently scrapped.
HMS Quorn	Royal Navy	World War II: The Hunt-class destroyer (1,000/1,340 t, 1940) was torpedoed and sunk off Normandy by a Kriegsmarine Marder midget submarine. 130 crew were killed.
Samlong	United Kingdom	World War II: The Liberty ship (7,176 GRT, 1943) was torpedoed and damaged in the English Channel off Normandy, France. She was declared a constructive total loss.
Seiko Maru	Imperial Japanese Navy	World War II: The auxiliary netlayer was torpedoed and sunk in the Molucca Sea outside Tobabi Port, Tobabi Island, north coast of Mangole Island, Sula Islands (1°46′S 126°15′E) by USS Cod (United States Navy). Two crew and 56 passengers were killed.
TShch-127	Soviet Navy	World War II: The auxiliary minesweeper was sunk by a mine off Mantsinsaari island, Lake Ladoga. 6 names of killed crew are listed for this loss on the OBD Memorial website.

== 4 August ==
List of shipwrecks: 4 August 1944
Ship	State	Description
Enju Maru	Imperial Japanese Navy	World War II: Operation Scavenger: Convoy 4804: The Enju Maru-class auxiliary transport was sunk in the Pacific Ocean 50 nautical miles (93 km) north west of Chichijima 28°33′N 141°48′E by aircraft of Task Group 58.1, United States Navy. Twenty-one passengers and 52 crewmen were killed.
GK 61 Pétrel	Kriegsmarine	World War II: The guard ship was torpedoed at Heraklion, Crete, Greece, by HMS Vox (Royal Navy).
Koshu Maru	Imperial Japanese Army	World War II: The Anshu Maru-class transport ship was torpedoed and sunk in south end of the Strait of Makassar (04°05′S 117°40′E) by USS Ray (United States Navy). Aboard were 1,513 Javanese laborers to repair the Japanese airfield at Makassar and 540 other passengers. 1,239 laborers, 273 passengers and 28 gunners and crewmen were killed.
Lena Luckenbach	United States	The 1120-class cargo ship was scuttled off Normandy as a blockship/breakwater for Gooseberry No. 2, Omaha Beach.
M 422	Kriegsmarine	World War II: The minesweeper was bombed and sunk in the English Channel off Saint-Malo, Ille-et-Vilaine, France, by Allied aircraft.
M 424	Kriegsmarine	World War II: The minesweeper was bombed and severely damaged in the English Channel off Saint-Malo by Allied aircraft. She was not repaired.
M 444	Kriegsmarine	World War II: The minesweeper was sunk in the Bay of Biscay off Brest, Finistère, France by an Allied air attack.
Matsu	Imperial Japanese Navy	World War II: Convoy 4804: The Matsu-class destroyer was shelled and sunk in the Pacific Ocean 50 nautical miles (93 km) north west of Chichijima (27°40′N 141°48′E) by USS Cogswell, USS Ingersoll and USS Knapp (all United States Navy) with the loss of 205 of her 210 crew.
Maycrest	United Kingdom	World War II: The cargo ship was sunk as a breakwater for Gooseberry No. 2, Omaha Beach, Normandy, France.
Miyagi Maru	Imperial Japanese Navy	World War II: The patrol boat was torpedoed and sunk in the Pacific Ocean off Honshu (28°11′N 141°43′E) by USS Sterlet (United States Navy).
No. 15	Soviet Navy	The R Type minesweeper was lost on this date.
Petrel	Kriegsmarine	World War II: The auxiliary minesweeper was torpedoed and sunk in the Mediterranean Sea off the south coast of France by HMS Universal (Royal Navy).
Ryoku Maru	Japan	World War II: The collier was shelled and sunk in the Pacific Ocean off the Bonin Islands by USS Biloxi (United States Navy).
SAT 12 Globe	Kriegsmarine	World War II: The Artilleriefährprahm was bombed and sunk in the North Sea off Walcheren, Schleswig-Holstein.
Sierra Cordoba	Kriegsmarine	World War II: The accommodation ship was damaged by fire in an Allied air raid at Hamburg. She was subsequently repaired and returned to service.
Sperrbrecher 146 Havik	Kriegsmarine	World War II: The Sperrbrecher was bombed and sunk at Pauillac, Gironde, France, in an Allied air raid.
Syogen Maru	Japan	World War II: The cargo ship was sunk in the Pacific Ocean (27°40′N 141°48′E) by United States Navy aircraft carrier-based aircraft.
T-4	Imperial Japanese Navy	World War II: The No.1-class landing ship was bombed and damaged at Futami Port, Chichi Jima, (27°07′N 142°12′E) by aircraft from USS Cabot (United States Navy). She was bombed and sunk (27°07′N 142°12′E) with all crew on 5 August by aircraft from USS Bunker Hill (United States Navy), or stranded and flooded at Futami Port on 4 August and bombed and further damaged on 5 August.
T-133	Imperial Japanese Navy	World War II: Operation Scavenger: Convoy 4804: The No. 103-class landing ship was bombed and sunk off Chichi Jima, (24°47′N 141°20′E) by aircraft of Task Group 58.1, United States Navy.
Tannenfels	Germany	World War II: The cargo ship was sunk as a blockship in the Gironde, at Le Verdon-sur-Mer, Gironde.
Theologos SA 83	Greece	World War II: The sailing vessel (25 GRT) was shelled and sunk at Heraklion by HMS Vox (Royal Navy).
Thetis	Greece	World War II: The sailing vessel was shelled and sunk at Heraklion by HMS Vox (Royal Navy).
Tonegawa Maru	Imperial Japanese Army	World War II: Operation Scavenger: Convoy 4804: The Ryunan Maru-class auxiliary transport was shelled/bombed and sunk in the Pacific Ocean north west of Chichijima, at the north end of the Ogasawara Islands, (27°40′N 141°48′E) by USS Mobile (United States Navy) and United States Navy aircraft. Sixty-one troops and 83 crewmen were killed.
Unkai Maru No. 7	Imperial Japanese Navy	World War II: Operation Scavenger: Convoy 4804: The transport was sunk in the Pacific Ocean 50 nautical miles (93 km) north west of Chichijima 27°05′N 142°11′E by aircraft of Task Group 58.1, United States Navy.
Zensho Maru	Imperial Japanese Navy	World War II: The patrol boat was torpedoed and sunk in the Pacific Ocean off Honshu by USS Sterlet (United States Navy).

== 5 August ==
List of shipwrecks: 5 August 1944
Ship	State	Description
Eiko Maru No. 2	Japan	World War II: The ammunition transport was sunk at Halmahera, New Guinea by Consolidated PBY Catalina aircraft of the United States Navy.
Gunnaren	Sweden	World War II: The fishing trawler (62 GRT) struck a mine and sank in the Skaggerak off Skagen, Denmark. The whole crew survived
Hinemoa	New Zealand	The cargo ship was scuttled with explosives in Pegasus Bay, New Zealand after being used as a target earlier in the day.
Hinko Maru	Imperial Japanese Navy	World War II: The wreck of the Hinko Maru-class auxiliary transport was torpedoed and destroyed where she was beached in Futami Bay, Chichijima by United States Navy aircraft.
Kanno Maru	Imperial Japanese Navy	The auxiliary guard ship was lost on this date.
HMS LCT 1039	Royal Navy	The Mk 4-class landing craft tank (350/586 t, 1944) was lost on this date.
HMS LCT 1076	Royal Navy	The Mk 4-class landing craft tank (350/586 t, 1944) foundered on this date.
La Mailleraye	Vichy France	World War II: The cargo ship was shelled and sunk by Allied forces at Pauillac.
M 271	Kriegsmarine	World War II: The minesweeper was bombed and sunk at Pauillac, Gironde, France by Allied aircraft.
M 325	Kriegsmarine	World War II: The minesweeper was bombed and sunk at Pauillac by Allied aircraft.
Mefküre	Turkey	World War II: The motor schooner was torpedoed and sunk at Constanţa, Romania, by Shch-215 (Soviet Navy) with the loss of 305 lives.
Miyako Maru	Imperial Japanese Navy	World War II: The transport ship was torpedoed and sunk in the Pacific Ocean by USS Barbel (United States Navy).
No. 708	Soviet Navy	The R Type minesweeper was lost on this date.
No. 907	Soviet Navy	The KM-4-class river minesweeping launch was sunk on this date.
Shirohama Maru	Imperial Japanese Army	World War II: The Zuikai Maru-class auxiliary transport (a.k.a. Shirahama Maru) was bombed and sunk in shallow water while docking in Beaton Bay, Celebes (05°00′N 123°00′E), or off Boetoeng, Api Island, Celebes Islands (04°40′S 122°47′E) by North American B-25 Mitchell aircraft of the United States Army Air Forces. The wreck was abandoned two days later.
T-2	Imperial Japanese Navy	World War II: The No.1-class landing ship was bombed and damaged off Chichi Jima (27°07′N 142°12′E) by aircraft from USS Bunker Hill (United States Navy). Later, in a storm, she struck a reef and sank at 27°05′N 142°09′E.
Tsurumi Maru	Imperial Japanese Navy	World War II: The Shiretoko-class fleet oiler was torpedoed and sunk in Davao Gulf (05°53′N 125°41′E) by USS Cero (United States Navy).
U-671	Kriegsmarine	World War II: The Type VIIC submarine was depth charged and sunk in the English Channel south of Brighton, Sussex, United Kingdom (50°23′N 0°06′E) by HMS Stayner and HMS Wensleydale (both Royal Navy) with the loss of 47 of her 52 crew.
V 725 Petit Poilu	Kriegsmarine	World War II: The Vorpostenboot was bombed and sunk at Pauillac by Allied aircraft.
Yayoi Maru	Imperial Japanese Navy	World War II: The Yayoi Maru-class transport ship was either torpedoed and sunk in the Pacific Ocean by USS Cobia (United States Navy), or bombed and heavily damaged by aircraft from Task Force 58 on 4 August, 22 nautical miles (41 km) north west of Mukojima, Ogasawara Gunto, setting her ablaze and later abandoned by her crew. She sank the next day at 28°33′N 141°48′E.

== 6 August ==
List of shipwrecks: 6 August 1944
Ship	State	Description
Amethyste	Germany	World War II: The cargo ship was sunk at St. Malo, France.
Ch 1	Kriegsmarine	World War II: The Ch 1-class submarine chaser was bombed and sunk at Toulon, Var by Allied aircraft.
Empire City	United Kingdom	World War II: Convoy DKA 21: The cargo ship (7,295 GRT, 1943) was torpedoed and sunk in the Mozambique Channel (11°33′S 41°25′E) by U-198 ( Kriegsmarine) with the loss of two (Engineers) of her 70 crew. The rest of the survivors reached land in their lifeboats.
Fukuju Maru	Imperial Japanese Army	World War II: Convoy TAMO-29: The Fukuju Maru-class auxiliary transport was torpedoed and sunk in the East China Sea south of Shushan Island (34°10′N 128°58′E) by USS Picuda (United States Navy). 28 crewmen killed.
HDML 1060	Royal Navy	World War II: Battle of Crete: The Harbour Defence Motor Launch (44/52 t, 1942) was sunk by an ammunition explosion in Poole area. Three crew were killed.
M 133	Kriegsmarine	World War II: The Type 1935 minesweeper was scuttled at Saint-Malo, Ille-et-Vilaine, France
M 206	Kriegsmarine	World War II: The Type 1935 minesweeper was scuttled at Saint-Malo.
M 263	Kriegsmarine	World War II: The minesweeper was shelled and sunk north of the Île d'Yeu by HMCS Haida, HMCS Iroquois (both Royal Canadian Navy), HMS Ashanti and HMS Tartar (both Royal Navy).
M 486	Kriegsmarine	World War II: The minesweeper was shelled and sunk off Les Sables-d'Olonne.
M 4612 Walkerie	Kriegsmarine	The naval trawler/auxiliary minesweeper was lost on this date.
Mameluck	Kriegsmarine	World War II: The Le Hardi-class destroyer was sunk in an American air raid on Toulon.
Otto	Germany	World War II: The coaster was sunk in the Bay of Biscay north of the Île d'Yeu by HMS Ashanti, HMS Bellona, HMS Tartar (all Royal Navy), HMCS Haida and HMCS Iroquois (both Royal Canadian Navy).
SG 3 Sans Souci	Kriegsmarine	World War II: The Sans Souci-class sloop was bombed and sunk in the Bay of Biscay off Les Sables-d'Olonne (46°30′N 01°47′W) by Allied aircraft with the loss of 40 lives.
Shiroganesan Maru	Imperial Japanese Army	World War II: Convoy SAMA-16: The Type 1B Wartime Standard cargo ship (a.k.a. Siroganesan Maru) was torpedoed and sunk in the South China Sea (14°10′N 117°02′E) west of Luzon, Philippines by USS Rasher (United States Navy). Fifteen passengers, fourteen gunners and 22 crewmen were killed.
Shonan Maru	Japan	World War II: Convoy MOTA-22: The Shonan Maru class ore carrier was torpedoed and sunk in the East China Sea (30°55′N 129°45′E) north west of Kuroshima Island, Japan by USS Pintado (United States Navy). Five crewmen were killed. Four Daihatsu landing barges go down with the ship.
Showa Maru No. 6 GO	Imperial Japanese Navy	World War II: The auxiliary submarine chaser was lost.
Thétis	French Navy	World War II: The unrepaired hulk of the Circé-class submarine sank at Toulon, France, due either to neglect or damage inflicted by bombs during an Allied air raid.
U-471	Kriegsmarine	World War II: The Type VII submarine was bombed and sunk at Toulon by Consolidated B-24 Liberator aircraft of the United States Army Air Force. She was raised in 1945, repaired and entered Marine Nationale service in 1946 as Millé.
U-736	Kriegsmarine	World War II: The Type VIIC submarine was depth charged and sunk in the Bay of Biscay (47°19′N 4°16′W) by HMS Loch Killin (Royal Navy) with the loss of 28 of her 47 crew.
U-952	Kriegsmarine	World War II: The Type VIIC submarine was sunk at Toulon in an American air raid.
U-969	Kriegsmarine	World War II: The Type VIIC submarine was bombed and destroyed at Toulon by Consolidated B-24 Liberator aircraft of the United States Army Air Force.
UJ 6085	Kriegsmarine	World War II: The UJ 6077-class submarine chaser was sunk at Toulon by Allied aircraft.
Uwajima Maru No. 15	Japan	World War II: The cargo ship was bombed and sunk in the Banda Sea by North American B-25 Mitchell aircraft of the Royal Netherlands Air Force.
V 215 Oliva	Kriegsmarine	World War II: The Vorpostenboot was scuttled at Saint-Malo, Ille-et-Vilaine, France.
V 414 Sachsenwald	Kriegsmarine	World War II: The Vorpostenboot was sunk by Royal Navy warships in the Bay of Biscay north of the Île d'Yeu, France.
V-1594	Kriegsmarine	World War II: The cable ship was sunk by Royal Navy warships in the Bay of Biscay north of the Île d'Yeu, France.
Zuisho Maru	Japan	World War II: The cargo ship was torpedoed and sunk in the South China Sea by USS Ray (United States Navy).

== 7 August ==
List of shipwrecks: 7 August 1944
Ship	State	Description
Amsterdam	United Kingdom	World War II: The hospital ship (4,220 GRT, 1930) was sunk by a mine while taking casualties from Juno Beach, Calvados, France. A total of 55 patients, ten Royal Army Medical Corps staff, 30 crew and eleven prisoners of war were killed.
Chuiloide	Brazil	The cargo ship collided with Tiete (Brazil) in the Atlantic Ocean off Santa Catarina, Brazil (28°05′S 48°30′W). Both ships sank.
Condé	Kriegsmarine	World War II: The accommodation ship was bombed, set afire and sunk at Nice, Alpes-Maritimes, France She was refloated on 28 December and used as a coal hulk at Marseille, Bouches-du-Rhône, France. Condé was sold for scrapping on 9 May 1947.
Empire Day	United Kingdom	World War II: The cargo ship (7,242 GRT, 1941) was torpedoed and sunk in the Indian Ocean off Dar es Salaam, Tanganyika (7°06′S 42°00′E) by U-198 ( Kriegsmarine). Her captain was taken aboard U-198 as a prisoner of war. The rest of her 42 crew reached land in their lifeboats.
F 963	Kriegsmarine	The Type D Marinefahrprahm was sunk on this date.
F 968	Kriegsmarine	The Type D Marinefahrprahm was sunk on this date.
Kinshu Maru	Japan	World War II: The coaster was torpedoed and sunk in the Luzon Strait by USS Sailfish (United States Navy).
Kusagaki	Imperial Japanese Navy	World War II: Convoy MI-13: The Mikura-class escort ship was torpedoed and sunk in the South China Sea (14°50′N 119°57′E) north west of Subic Bay, Luzon, Philippines by USS Guitarro (United States Navy). 97 crew were killed. 30 survivors were rescued by Asakaze (Imperial Japanese Navy).
Kyo Maru No. 2	Imperial Japanese Navy	World War II: The auxiliary submarine chaser was torpedoed and sunk in the Moro Gulf off Zamboanga City, Philippines by USS Puffer (United States Navy).
USS LCT-182	United States Navy	The LCT Mk 5-class landing craft tank foundered in heavy seas in the Kula Gulf off the Solomon Islands.
L'Impetuese/FR 54	Germany	World War II: The Élan-class minesweeper was scuttled at Marseille.
M 3201	Kriegsmarine	World War II: The minesweeper struck a mine and sank in the North Sea off Zeebrugge, West Flanders, Belgium.
Nagara	Imperial Japanese Navy	World War II: The Nagara-class cruiser was torpedoed and sunk in the East China Sea off the Amakusa Islands (32°09′N 129°53′E) by USS Croaker (United States Navy). 349 crew died. There were 237 survivors.
Rikke	Denmark	World War II: The cargo ship struck a mine and sank in Øresund.
RO 8 Irene	Kriegsmarine	World War II: The transport ship was scuttled as a blockship at Saint-Malo, Ille-et-Vilaine, France. She was refloated in 1945 and scrapped in 1946.
Shinten Maru	Japan	World War II: The cargo ship was torpedoed and sunk in the Luzon Strait by USS Sailfish (United States Navy).
William L. Marcy	United States	World War II: The Liberty ship was torpedoed and damaged in the English Channel by Kriegsmarine schnellboote and was declared a constructive total loss.
Yamatama Maru	Japan	World War II: The cargo ship was torpedoed and sunk in the Celebes Sea south of Mindanao, Philippines by USS Bluegill (United States Navy).

== 8 August ==
List of shipwrecks: 8 August 1944
Ship	State	Description
Admiralty Floating Dry Dock No. 23	Royal Navy	The floating dry dock suffered a broken back, broke in two and sank at Trincomalee, Ceylon when improperly pumped out with the battleship HMS Valiant (Royal Navy) in the dock.
Conte Verde	Imperial Japanese Navy	World War II: The ocean liner (a.k.a. Teikyo Maru) was bombed and sunk in the Huangpu River at Shanghai, China by a Consolidated B-24 Liberator aircraft of the 373rd Bomb Squadron, United States Army Air Force. She was raised by the Japanese on 16 December and towed to Shanghai for repairs.
Ezra Weston	United States	World War II: Convoy EBC 66: The Liberty ship was torpedoed and sunk in the Atlantic Ocean 8 nautical miles (15 km) off Trevose Head, Cornwall (50°47′N 5°03′W) by U-667 ( Kriegsmarine). All 71 crew were rescued by HMT Jacques Morgand and HMS LCT 24 (both Royal Navy).
F 434	Kriegsmarine	The Type C Marinefahrprahm was sunk on this date.
Fort Yale	United Kingdom	World War II: The Fort ship (7,134 GRT, 1942) struck a mine and was damaged in the Atlantic Ocean (49°25′N 0°27′W. She was taken in tow, but was torpedoed and sunk at 50°23′N 0°55′W) by U-480 ( Kriegsmarine) on 23 August.
M 366	Kriegsmarine	World War II: The Type 1940 minesweeper was bombed and sunk in the Bay of Biscay off Île Noirmoutier, Finistère, France by Bristol Beaufighter aircraft of 236 Squadron, Royal Air Force and 404 Squadron, Royal Canadian Air Force.
M 367	Kriegsmarine	World War II: The Type 1940 minesweeper was bombed and sunk in the Bay of Biscay off Île Noirmoutier by Bristol Beaufighter aircraft of 236 Squadron, Royal Air Force and 404 Squadron, Royal Canadian Air Force.
M 422	Kriegsmarine	World War II: The Type 1940 minesweeper was bombed and sunk in the Bay of Biscay off Gironde, France, by British aircraft.
M 428	Kriegsmarine	World War II: The Type 1940 minesweeper was bombed and sunk in the Bay of Biscay off Île Noirmoutier by Bristol Beaufighter aircraft of 236 Squadron, Royal Air Force and 404 Squadron, Royal Canadian Air Force.
M 438	Kriegsmarine	World War II: The Type 1940 minesweeper was bombed and sunk in the Bay of Biscay off Île Noirmoutier by Bristol Beaufighter aircraft of 236 Squadron, Royal Air Force and 404 Squadron, Royal Canadian Air Force.
PiLB 264	Kriegsmarine	The PiLB 40 type landing craft was lost on this date.
HMCS Regina	Royal Canadian Navy	World War II: Convoy EBC 66: The Flower-class corvette was torpedoed and sunk in the Atlantic Ocean off Trevose Head (50°42′N 5°03′W) by U-667 ( Kriegsmarine) with the loss of 30 of her 96 crew. Survivors were rescued by HMT Jacques Morgand and HMS LCT 644 (both Royal Navy).
Sperrbrecher 134 Falke	Kriegsmarine	World War II: The Sperrbrecher was bombed and sunk in the Bay of Biscay off Lorient, Morbihan, France by Allied aircraft.
Tama Maru No. 6	Imperial Japanese Navy	World War II: The auxiliary submarine chaser was torpedoed and sunk in the Pacific Ocean off Honshu by USS Sterlet (United States Navy).

== 9 August ==
List of shipwrecks: 9 August 1944
Ship	State	Description
Boko Maru	Japan	World War II: The cargo ship was torpedoed and sunk in the East China Sea north west of Tokunoshima (27°56′N 128°47′E) by USS Barbel (United States Navy).
Hiyoshi Maru No. 3	Japan	World War II: The fishing trawler was sunk in the Strait of Malacca by HMS Trenchant (Royal Navy).
Koshin Maru	Imperial Japanese Navy	Convoy MOTA-22: The Koshin Maru-class transport (6,350 GRT 1938) was sunk when her cargo of ammunition caught fire and exploded in the East China Sea north west of Formosa (26°10′N 124°15′E). Twenty-eight crewmen were killed.
HMS LCM 618	Royal Navy	The landing craft mechanized (22/52 t, 1942) was lost on this date.
HMS LCM 640	Royal Navy	The landing craft mechanized (22/52 t, 1942) was lost on this date.
USS PT-509	United States Navy	World War II: The ELCO 80'-class PT boat was shelled, rammed and sunk off Jersey, Channel Islands by a Kriegsmarine minesweeper. 14 crew were killed and the sole survivor was captured.
Spichern	Kriegsmarine	World War II: The tanker was bombed and severely damaged at Brest, Finistère, France in an Allied air raid. She was scuttled as a blockship on 31 August. She was raised in 1947, repaired and returned to service in May 1949 as the Norwegian Ringfjell.
Splendor	Italy	World War II: The tanker was bombed and sunk in an Allied air raid on Savona.
TA19	Kriegsmarine	World War II: The torpedo boat, a former Curtatone-class destroyer, was torpedoed and sunk in the Aegean Sea by Pipinos (Royal Hellenic Navy).
Tokuyu Maru or Tokuyusan Maru	Japan	World War II: The cargo ship was bombed and sunk at Halmahera, New Guinea by North American B-25 Mitchell aircraft of the United States Army Air Force.
V 241 Oliva	Kriegsmarine	World War II: The KFK 2-class Vorpostenboot was sunk in the English Channel off Fécamp, Seine-Inférieure, France by HMGB Grey Owl and HMGB Grey Shark (both Royal Navy).
Yagi Maru	Japan	World War II: The cargo ship was torpedoed and sunk in the East China Sea north west of Tokunoshima (27°56′N 128°47′E) by USS Barbel (United States Navy).

== 10 August ==
List of shipwrecks: 10 August 1944
Ship	State	Description
FN 02 Kunlabori	Kriegsmarine	The guard ship was sunk on this date.
Iddesleigh	United Kingdom	World War II: The cargo ship was torpedoed by a Kriegsmarine E-boat and was beached at Langrune-sur-Mer, Calvados, France. She was sunk on 17 August by a manned torpedo.
Johanna	Germany	World War II: The cargo ship departed from Istanbul, Turkey on this date. Believed to have been subsequently torpedoed and sunk in the Black Sea. Raised post-war, repaired and put into Soviet service as Marshal Tolbukhin.
Kertosono	Germany	World War II: The cargo liner was scuttled at Nantes, Loire-Inférieure, France. She was refloated in August 1945 and scrapped in 1947.
HMS LCT 1092	Royal Navy	The LCT Mk 4-class landing craft tank (350/586 t, 1944) sank while under tow.
Lindau	Kriegsmarine	World War II: The accommodation ship was set on fire in the Loire River at Nantes (47°13′N 01°34′W) by German Forces and sunk by the explosion of mines being stored on the ship. She was raised in 1946 and towed to Antwerp, Belgium, for scrapping.
M 133	Kriegsmarine	World War II: The minesweeper was scuttled at Saint-Malo, Ille-et-Vilaine, France.
M 384	Kriegsmarine	World War II: The minesweeper was scuttled at Nantes, Loire-Inférieure, France.
Monsun	Germany	World War II: The tanker (8,038 GRT, 1929) was bombed and sunk at Nantes by Allied aircraft. She was refloated in March 1945, repaired and entered French service in March 1948 as Brière.
R 34	Kriegsmarine	World War II: The Type R-25 minesweeper was sunk by aircraft off Milos, Greece.
R 89	Kriegsmarine	World War II: The minesweeper was sunk in an Allied air raid on "Lepsoe", Norway.
RA 260	Kriegsmarine	The RA 251-class minesweeper ran aground at Cape Mortula, Italy, and was wrecked.
Sakue Maru Go	Japan	World War II: The cargo ship was sunk in an air attack at Rabaul.
Santos	Germany	World War II: The cargo ship was bombed and sunk at Borkum, Lower Saxony in a British air raid.
Seiyo Maru	Japan	World War II: The cargo ship was torpedoed and sunk in the Pacific Ocean by USS Bowfin (United States Navy).
Shinei Maru	Imperial Japanese Army	World War II: The Standard Type 1TM tanker was torpedoed and sunk in the South China Sea off Cape Bolinao, Philippines (16°15′N 119°45′E) by USS Guitarro (United States Navy). A crewman was killed.
Toseki Maru	Imperial Japanese Navy	World War II: The auxiliary submarine chaser was torpedoed and sunk in the Molucca Sea south of the Celebes Islands, Netherlands East Indies by USS Cod (United States Navy).
U-608	Kriegsmarine	World War II: The Type VIIC submarine was depth charged and sunk in the Bay of Biscay off La Rochelle, Charente-Maritime, France (46°30′N 3°08′W) by a Consolidated B-24 Liberator aircraft of 53 Squadron, Royal Air Force and by HMS Wren (Royal Navy). All 52 crew survived.
Vierlanden	Germany	World War II: The tanker was scuttled at Nantes. She was refloated in October. Subsequently repaired, and entered French service as Palmyre in May 1946.

== 11 August ==
List of shipwrecks: 11 August 1944
Ship	State	Description
Antarktis	Germany	World War II: The tanker was scuttled at Couëron, Loire-Inférieure, France. The wreck was partly raised in 1946, and scrapped in 1948. The part not raised was scrapped in situ in 1948.
Baudoinville	Germany	World War II: The ship was scuttled at Nantes, Loire-Inférieure, France.
Erling Lindøe	Norway	World War II: The cargo ship (1,281 GRT, 1917) struck a mine and sank in the Kattegat with the loss of nineteen of her 25 crew.
Ermland	Kriegsmarine	World War II: The auxiliary ship was bombed and sunk by aircraft off Nantes. The wreck was raised and broken up in February 1945.
Giuseppe Dormio	Italy	World War II: The cargo ship struck a mine and sank in the Mediterranean Sea while sailing from Pola to Fiume. There were 6 dead.
Gotland	Sweden	World War II: The fishing trawler (63 GRT) struck a mine and sank in the Skaggerak off Hanstholm, Denmark with the loss of all five crew.
Ikuta Maru	Japan	World War II: The tanker struck a mine and sank off Sumatra, Netherlands East Indies.
Kraft	Germany	World War II: The salvage vessel was scuttled at Nantes.
La Baise	Vichy France	World War II: The tanker was destroyed on the stocks at Nantes
La Mayenne	Vichy France	World War II: The tanker was destroyed on the stocks at Nantes.
M 27	Kriegsmarine	World War II: The minesweeper struck a mine and sank in the Gironde at Pauillac, Gironde, France. 41 crew were killed.
M 84	Kriegsmarine	World War II: The Type 1935 minesweeper was scuttled at Le Havre, Seine-Inférieure, France.
M 384	Kriegsmarine	World War II: The Type 1940 minesweeper was scuttled at Nantes.
M 4408 Harle	Kriegsmarine	The naval trawler/auxiliary minesweeper was lost on this date.
Monsun	Germany	World War II: The tanker was scuttled at Nantes.
Olinda	Germany	World War II: The cargo ship was scuttled at Nantes.
Passat	Kriegsmarine	World War II: The tanker (8,998 GRT, 1926) was scuttled Nantes. The wreck was raised and broken up in 1949.
R-70	Kriegsmarine	World War II: The Type R-41 minesweeper was sunk by mines in the Gulf of Finland (60°20′N 27°50′E) with the loss of 21 lives.
Roko Maru	Japan	World War II: The cargo ship was sunk in the Pacific Ocean off Honshu by USS Tang (United States Navy).
Shinsei Maru No. 6	Japan	World War II: The cargo ship was torpedoed and sunk in the Molucca Sea by USS Cod (United States Navy).
Sperrbrecher 16 Tulane	Kriegsmarine	World War II: The Sperrbrecher (5,485 GRT) was bombed for the second day in a row at La Pallice, Seine-Inférieure, France by Allied aircraft. She was beached in the port to avoid capsizing. She was raised on 30 July 1946, repaired and returned to Norwegian service in February 1949 as Tulane.
Sperrbrecher 20 Kolente	Kriegsmarine	World War II: The Sperrbrecher was scuttled and Nantes. She was refloated post-war, repaired and returned to French service as Saint Michel.
TA1	Germany	World War II: The incomplete Le Fier-class torpedo boat was scuttled at Nantes.
TA2	Germany	World War II: The incomplete Le Fier-class torpedo boat was scuttled at Nantes.
TA3	Germany	World War II: The incomplete Le Fier-class torpedo boat was scuttled at Nantes.
TA6	Germany	World War II: The incomplete Le Fier-class torpedo boat was scuttled at Nantes.
Tenerife II	Germany	World War II: The cargo ship was scuttled at Nantes.
U-385	Kriegsmarine	World War II: The Type VIIC submarine was depth charged and sunk in the Bay of Biscay (46°16′N 2°45′W) by a Short Sunderland of 461 Squadron, Royal Australian Air Force and also by HMS Starling (Royal Navy) with the loss of one of her 43 crew.
U-967	Kriegsmarine	World War II: The Type VIIC/41 submarine was scuttled at Toulon, Var, France with the loss of two crew.
V 623 Jupiter	Kriegsmarine	World War II: The Vorpostenboot was scuttled at Nantes.
V 723 Jeanne Marie	Kriegsmarine	The naval trawler/Vorpostenboot was lost on this date.
Wangerland	Germany	World War II: The tanker was scuttled at Nantes.
Wilhelm A. Riedemann	Germany	World War II: The tanker was scuttled at Nantes. She was refloated on 1 May 1945 and scrapped in 1947.
Wille	Germany	World War II: The salvage vessel was scuttled at Nantes.

== 12 August ==
List of shipwrecks: 12 August 1944
Ship	State	Description
Fusijama	Germany	World War II: The cargo ship was scuttled as a blockship at Bassens, Gironde, France. She was refloated in 1945 and scrapped.
Himalaya	Germany	World War II: The cargo ship was scuttled as a blockship in the Gironde. She was refloated in 1945 and scrapped.
Kentuckian	United States	World War II: The cargo ship was sunk as a breakwater for Gooseberry No. 2 off Omaha Beach, Calvados, France.
Koan Maru	Japan	World War II: The cargo ship was torpedoed and sunk in the Pacific Ocean by USS Barbel (United States Navy).
M 84	Kriegsmarine	World War II: The minesweeper was bombed and destroyed at Le Havre, Seine-Inférieure, France in an Allied air raid.
M-370	Kriegsmarine	World War II: The minesweeper was bombed and damaged in the Bay of Biscay off Royan, Charente-Maritime, France by Bristol Beaufighter aircraft of 235 and 248 Squadrons, Royal Air Force. She was beached.
M-468	Kriegsmarine	World War II: The minesweeper struck a mine and sank north of Seter, Norway.
M 4204	Kriegsmarine	World War II: The minesweeper was sunk at La Pallice, Charente-Maritime, France in an Allied air raid.
Marina Raskova, T-114 and T-118	Soviet Union	World War II: Convoy BD 5: The cargo ship was torpedoed and damaged in the Kara Sea by U-365 ( Kriegsmarine). The submarine then sank the T-111 Starshiy Leytenant Lekarev-class minesweeper T-114 and T-118 off Bely Island (73°22′N 66°35′E). Marina Raskova was sunk by a coup de grâce from U-365 the next day at 73°21′N 67°20′E. Of the 632 men on the three ships, 373 were lost and only 259 were rescued. 186 were picked up by T-116 (Soviet Navy) and 73 others by Soviet Beriev MBR-2 aircraft.
Mayachi Maru	Japan	World War II: The cargo ship was torpedoed and sunk in the Sea of Okhotsk off Sakhalin by USS Pompon (United States Navy).
Mikage Maru No. 20	Japan	World War II: The cargo ship was torpedoed and sunk in the Sea of Okhotsk off Sakhalin by USS Pompon (United States Navy).
Nämdö	Sweden	World War II: The cargo ship (2,816 GRT) struck a mine and sank at the mouth of the Elbe (53°51′11″N 8°56′58″E) with the loss of four of her 27 crew.
R 15	Kriegsmarine	The minesweeper collided with S 629 (Kriegsmarine) at Šibenik, Yugoslavia and sank. She was later raised, repaired and returned to service.
Shinpo Maru	Imperial Japanese Navy	World War II: Convoy MI-13: The Standard Type 1TM-class tanker (a.k.a., Shimpo Maru and Shinho Maru) was torpedoed and damaged in the South China Sea off Cape Calavite, Mindoro, Philippines (13°18′N 120°11′E) by USS Puffer (United States Navy). 20 crewmen were killed. She was towed to the beach and abandoned off Cape Calavite. She was torpedoed and sunk on 17 August by USS Bluefish (United States Navy).
Sperrbrecher 7 Sauerland	Kriegsmarine	World War II: The Sperrbrecher (7,087 GRT) was hit by Rpyal Air Force aircraft off La Pallice, Charente-Maritime, and was shelled and destroyed in the same area (46°03′N 1°41′W) later in the day by HMS Diadem, HMS Onslow (both Royal Navy) and ORP Piorun (Polish Navy). Four crew were killed.
Teikon Maru	Japan	World War II: Convoy MI-13: The tanker was torpedoed and sunk in the South China Sea (13°18′N 120°11′E) by USS Puffer (United States Navy). There was no loss of life.
U-198	Kriegsmarine	World War II: The Type IXD2 submarine was sunk in the Indian Ocean near the Seychelles (3°35′S 52°49′E) by HMS Findhorn (Royal Navy) and HMIS Godavari (Royal Indian Navy) with the loss of all 66 crew and two prisoners of war. These were the captains of Empire City and Empire Day (both United Kingdom).
U-981	Kriegsmarine	World War II: The Type VIIC submarine was depth charged, mined and sunk in the Bay of Biscay at La Rochelle (45°41′N 1°25′W) by a Handley Page Halifax aircraft of 502 Squadron, Royal Air Force with the loss of twelve of her 52 crew.
Unknown	Unknown	World War II: A small local craft was sunk by HMIS HDML 1118 (Royal Indian Navy) after being fired on at the entrance to the Naaf River, Burma.
V 410 Germania	Kriegsmarine	World War II: The Vorpostenboot was sunk in the Gironde by Bristol Beaufighter aircraft of 235 and 248 Squadrons, Royal Air Force.
V 720	Kriegsmarine	World War II: The Vorpostenboot was shelled and set afire in the English Channel by HMS Albrighton (Royal Navy), HMCS Assiniboine, HMCS Qu'Appelle, HMCS Restigouche and HMCS Skeena (all Royal Canadian Navy). She was beached at Penmarc'h, Finistère, France.

== 13 August ==
List of shipwrecks: 13 August 1944
Ship	State	Description
Alcoa Leader	United States	World War II: The 1022 Hog Islander-class cargo ship was scuttled off Normandy as a blockship/breakwater for Gooseberry No. 2, Omaha Beach.
Asahari Maru No.2	Japan	World War II: The cargo ship was bombed and sunk in the South China Sea off Hong Kong by Consolidated B-24 Liberator aircraft of the United States Fourteenth Air Force.
Cagliari	Italy	World War II: The cargo ship was sunk at Poreč, Yugoslavia in an Allied air raid.
Ch-12	Imperial Japanese Navy	World War II: The auxiliary submarine chaser was torpedoed and sunk in Davao Gulf by USS Bluegill (United States Navy).
Dietrich von Bern	Kriegsmarine	World War II: The auxiliary minelayer was sunk in an Allied air raid on Genoa, Italy.
USS Flier	United States Navy	World War II: The Gato-class submarine struck a mine and sank in the Balabac Strait with 12 of her 60 crew escaping the boat, but only 8 reaching the shore.
Hamayoshi Maru No. 3	Japan	World War II: The cargo ship was sunk in the Pacific Ocean off the south west tip of New Guinea by Bristol Beaufighter aircraft of the Royal Australian Air Force.
Kojun Maru	Japan	World War II: The transport was torpedoed and sunk in the entrance to Davao Gulf east of Mindanao (06°17′N 126°10′E) by USS Bluegill (United States Navy). A total of 42 people were killed.
M 383	Kriegsmarine	World War II: The Type 1940 minesweeper was sunk in the North Sea off Langeoog, Lower Saxony by Bristol Beaufighter aircraft of 254 Squadron, Royal Air Force.
Misago Maru	Imperial Japanese Navy	World War II: The auxiliary submarine chaser was torpedoed and sunk in the entrance to Davao Gulf east of Mindanao (06°17′N 126°10′E) by USS Bluegill (United States Navy). Five crewmen killed.
Radbury	United Kingdom	World War II: The cargo ship (3,614 GRT, 1910) was torpedoed and sunk in the Mozambique Channel (24°20′S 41°45′E) by U-862 (Kriegsmarine) with the loss of 23 of her 55 crew.
Schodack	United States	World War II: The cargo ship was sunk as a breakwater off the coast of Calvados, France.
Sperrbrecher 5 Schwanheim	Kriegsmarine	World War II: The Sperrbrecher (5,339 GRT) was bombed and sunk off Royan, Charente-Inférieure, France (45°37′N 1°02′W) by Beaufighters of Royal Air Force with the loss of thirteen of her crew.
Sperrbrecher 6 Magdeburg	Kriegsmarine	World War II: The Sperrbrecher (6,128 GRT) was bombed and severely damaged off Royan, Charente-Inférieure, France, by Beaufighters of Royal Air Force with the loss of eight of her crew. She sank the next day. She was subsequently refloated and scrapped.
TF-11	Kriegsmarine	World War II: The torpedo training ship, a former Type 1940 minesweeper, was sunk in the Baltic Sea off Nida, Lithuania by Soviet Douglas A-20 Havoc aircraft.
Toei Maru	Japan	World War II: The cargo ship was torpedoed and sunk in the Pacific Ocean south of Hokkaido by USS Tambor (United States Navy).
U-270	Kriegsmarine	World War II: The Type VIIC submarine was depth charged and sunk in the Bay of Biscay west of La Rochelle, Charente-Maritime, France (46°19′N 2°56′W) by a Short Sunderland aircraft of 461 Squadron, Royal Australian Air Force. All 71 crew survived.
V 723 Jeanne Marie	Kriegsmarine	World War II: The Vorpostenboot was shelled and sunk at Brest, Finistère, France.
V 1101 Preußen	Kriegsmarine	World War II: The Vorpostenboot was sunk in the North Sea off Langeoog by Bristol Beaufighter aircraft of 254 Squadron, Royal Air Force.

== 14 August ==
List of shipwrecks: 14 August 1944
Ship	State	Description
Asaka Maru	Japan	World War II: Convoy MATA 26: The transport was driven ashore in the Bashi Islands, north of Luzon Philippines, by a typhoon. She was later refloated and returned to service.
Daigen Maru No. 7	Imperial Japanese Navy	World War II: The Tosho Maru-class auxiliary transport was torpedoed and sunk in the Yellow Sea off Incheon, Korea (37°30′N 125°50′E) by USS Croaker (United States Navy) with the loss of 13 crewmen.
Gueydon	French Navy	World War II: The hulk of the decommissioned armored cruiser was bombed and sunk at Brest, France, by Royal Air Force aircraft.
Ikomasan Maru	Japan	World War II: Convoy MATA 26: The transport was driven ashore in the Bashi Islands, north of Luzon, by a typhoon. She was later refloated and returned to service.
Kofresi	United States	World War II: The 1022 Hog Islander class cargo ship was sunk as a breakwater for Gooseberry No. 2 off Omaha Beach, Calvados, France. Other sources say 14 July.
HMS LCI(L) 99	Royal Navy	World War II: Convoy EBC 72: The landing craft infantry (194/387 t, 1942) was torpedoed and sunk in the Atlantic Ocean 11 nautical miles (20 km) south west of Hartland Point, Devon (50°56′N 4°47′W) by U-667 ( Kriegsmarine) with the loss of nine crew.
USS LST-921	United States Navy	World War II: Convoy EBC 72: The landing ship tank was torpedoed and damaged in the Atlantic Ocean 11 nautical miles (20 km) south west of Hartland Point (50°56′N 4°47′W) by U-667 ( Kriegsmarine) with the loss of 43 of her 113 crew. Survivors were rescued by HMS Londonderry (Royal Navy) and USS LST-920 (United States Navy). LST-921 had lost her stern, and was towed to Falmouth, Cornwall, where she was declared a total loss. Subsequently used by the United States Army as a floating machine ship at Antwerp, Belgium.
M 206	Kriegsmarine	World War II: The minesweeper was scuttled at Saint-Malo, Ille-et-Vilaine, France.
M 4463	Kriegsmarine	World War II: The minesweeper struck a mine and sank in the English Channel off La Pallice, Seine-Inférieure, France.
M 4612	Kriegsmarine	World War II: The minesweeper was scuttled at Saint-Malo.
Miikesan Maru	Japan	World War II: The cargo ship struck a mine and sank in the East China Sea off Formosa.
HMAS ML 430	Royal Australian Navy	World War II: The Fairmile B motor launch (76/86 t, 1943) was shelled and sunk north of Biak, New Guinea by HMAML 819 (Royal Australian Navy).
Sumatra	Germany	World War II: The cargo ship was scuttled in the Gironde. She was refloated in 1945.
T-129	Imperial Japanese Navy	World War II: The No.103-class landing ship was torpedoed and sunk in the Banda Sea about 40 miles south of Boeroe Island, Netherlands East Indies (04°17′S 126°46′E) by USS Cod (United States Navy).
Taketsu Maru	Japan	World War II: Convoy MATA 26: The tanker (a.k.a. Butsu Maru) broke up and sank in a typhoon off the Bashi Islands north of Luzon. Eight crewmen died.
Teisho Maru	Japan	The government chartered cargo ship was driven aground in a typhoon while anchoring off Saei (22°40′N 120°14′E). Refloated 12 September. Taken to Takao for repairs, arriving 27 September.
Todaro	Germany	World War II: The cargo ship was scuttled in the Gironde. She was refloated in 1945 and scrapped.
Tonan Maru No.2	Japan	World War II: The tanker was torpedoed and sunk in the East China Sea south of Shanghai, China by USS Pintado (United States Navy).
U-618	Kriegsmarine	World War II: The Type VIIC submarine was depth charged and sunk in the Bay of Biscay west of Saint-Nazaire, Loire-Inférieure, France (47°22′N 4°39′W) by HMS Duckworth and HMS Essington (both Royal Navy) and a Consolidated B-24 Liberator aircraft of 53 Squadron, Royal Air Force with the loss of all 61 crew.
V 605 Arthur Duncker	Kriegsmarine	World War II: The Vorpostenboot struck a mine and sank in the English Channel off La Pallice.
V 727 Goeland	Kriegsmarine	World War II: The Vorpostenboot was scuttled at Saint-Malo.
Zuisho Maru	Japan	World War II: The cargo ship was torpedoed and sunk in the South China Sea north west of Borneo by USS Ray (United States Navy).

== 15 August ==
List of shipwrecks: 15 August 1944
Ship	State	Description
FL 04 Edouard Gougy	Kriegsmarine	The naval trawler was lost on this date.
USS LCI-1588	United States Navy	World War II: Operation Dragoon: The landing craft infantry struck a mine and sank in the Mediterranean Sea off the coast of Var.
USS LCI-1590	United States Navy	World War II: Operation Dragoon: The landing craft infantry struck a mine and sank in the Mediterranean Sea off the coast of Var.
USS LST-282	United States Navy	World War II: Convoy EBC 72: The landing ship tank was damaged by a German glide bomb off Saint-Tropez, Var. She was beached and abandoned (43°25′N 06°50′E).
HMS LST-404	Royal Navy	World War II: Convoy FTM 69: The landing ship tank (1,625/4,080 t, 1942) was torpedoed and damaged in the English Channel 35 nautical miles (65 km) south east of St Catherine's Point, Isle of Wight (50°02′N 0°38′W) by U-741 ( Kriegsmarine) with the loss of eight crew and several German prisoners of war. She was taken in tow by USS ATR-4 (United States Navy) and was beached at Ryde, Isle of Wight. HMS LST-404 later broke in two and was declared a total loss. Scrapped at Zeebrugge, West Flanders, Belgium in June 1948.
M 275	Kriegsmarine	World War II: The minesweeper was shelled and severely damaged in the Bay of Biscay by HMS Mauritius, HMS Ursa (both Royal Navy) and HMCS Iroquois (Royal Canadian Navy) and was abandoned.
M 385	Kriegsmarine	World War II: The minesweeper was shelled and sunk in the Bay of Biscay off Les Sables-d'Olonne, Vendée, France, by HMS Mauritius, HMS Ursa (both Royal Navy) and HMCS Iroquois (Royal Canadian Navy).
M 4001 Este	Kriegsmarine	World War II: The minesweeper was bombed and sunk at Brest, Finistère, France in a Royal Air Force air raid.
M 4047 Vaterland	Kriegsmarine	The auxiliary minesweeper was sunk on this date.
USS PT-202	United States Navy	World War II: Operation Dragoon: The PT boat struck a mine and sank in the Mediterranean Sea off the coast of Var.
USS PT-218	United States Navy	World War II: Operation Dragoon: The PT boat struck a mine and sank in the Mediterranean Sea off the coast of Var.
R-29	Kriegsmarine	World War II: The Type R-25 minesweeper was sunk by Soviet aircraft in the Gulf of Finland.
Richthofen	Luftwaffe	World War II: The Hans Albrecht Wedel-class seaplane tender sank at Königsberg, East Prussia during fitting out, or was shelled and sunk off Les Sables-d'Olonne by HMS Mauritius (Royal Navy).
Sakura Maru No. 14	Japan	World War II: The cargo ship was bombed and sunk in the Pacific Ocean north of Timor, Netherlands East Indies by North American B-25 Mitchell aircraft of the Royal Netherlands Air Force.
Schnelles Geleitboot 25	Kriegsmarine	World War II: The escort ship was sunk at Toulon by United States Army Air Force aircraft.
SG 21 Bernd Von Arnim	Kriegsmarine	World War II: Battle of Port Cros: The Chamois-class aviso was shelled and sunk in the Mediterranean Sea off Port Cros, Var by USS Somers (United States Navy). There were 99 survivors.
Sperrbrecher 157	Kriegsmarine	World War II: The Sperrbrecher was sunk in the Bay of Biscay off Les Sables d'Olonne (46°30′N 1°47′W) by HMS Mauritius, HMS Ursa (both Royal Navy) and HMCS Iroquois (Royal Canadian Navy). One crew was killed.
Sudetenland	Germany	World War II: The tanker was sunk at Brest in a Royal Air Force air raid. She was subsequently refloated and scrapped.
Tosho Maru	Imperial Japanese Army	World War II: The transport ship (1,236 GRT) was bombed and sunk in the Banda Sea by Consolidated B-24 Liberator aircraft of the United States Army Air Force. Five crew and five passengers were killed.
U-741	Kriegsmarine	World War II: The Type VIIC submarine was depth charged and sunk in the English Channel off Le Havre, Seine-Inférieure, France (50°20′N 0°34′W) by HMS Orchis (Royal Navy) with the loss of 48 of her 49 crew.
UJ 6082	Kriegsmarine	World War II: The Gabbiano-class corvette was torpedoed and sunk in the Mediterranean Sea 70 nautical miles (130 km) south of Cannes, Alpes-Maritimes, France by USS Somers (United States Navy).
V 728 Vierge de Massabielle	Kriegsmarine	The naval trawler/Vorpostenboot was lost on this date.
V 803 Wiesbaden	Kriegsmarine	The Vorpostenboot was sunk on this date.
William D. Byron	United States	World War II: The Liberty ship struck a mine and was damaged in the Mediterranean Sea. She was towed to Savona, where she was declared a constructive total loss.

== 16 August ==
List of shipwrecks: 16 August 1944
Ship	State	Description
BKA-323	Soviet Navy	World War II: The MBK/Project 161-class motor gun boat was sunk by German aircraft in Lake Peipus. Four crew were killed.
Brinkum	Germany	World War II: The coastal tanker struck a mine and sank in the North Sea off "Lepsoe", Norway.
HMS BYMS-2022	Royal Navy	World War II: The YMS-1-class minesweeper (207/270 t, 1942) sunk by a mine in the Gulf of Frejus off Saint-Tropez, Var, France (43°24′N 06°46′E).
Courageous	United States	World War II: The cargo ship was sunk as a breakwater off Omaha Beach, Calvados, France.
Empire Lancer	United Kingdom	World War II: The cargo ship (7,037 GRT, 1942) was torpedoed and sunk in the Mozambique Channel (15°00′S 44°00′E) by U-862 ( Kriegsmarine) with the loss of 42 of her 79 crew.
KTShch-152	Soviet Navy	World War II: The K-15/M-17-class river minesweeping launch was sunk by a mine off Sevastopol. All nine crew were killed.
Lena Luckenbach	United States	World War II: The cargo ship was sunk as a breakwater off Omaha Beach.
M 4207 Les Baleines	Kriegsmarine	World War II: The naval trawler/auxiliary minesweeper was sunk by a mine in the Gironde estuary, France.
MAL 22	Kriegsmarine	World War II: The MAL 1A type landing fire support lighter ran aground near Meerapalu, Estonia and was abandoned after failed towing attempts.
HMS MFV 624	Royal Navy	The naval trawler sank in the English Channel off Normandy, France.
HMS MGB 313	Royal Navy	World War II: The Fairmile C motor gun boat (69/75 t, 1941) was sunk by a mine off Normandy. Eight crew were killed.
HMS ML 563	Royal Navy	World War II: Operation Dragoon: The Fairmile B motor launch (76/86 t, 1943) struck a mine and sank in the Gulf of Frejus off Saint-Tropez (43°25′N 06°43′E) while trying to assist YMS-24 (United States Navy). All crew survived but one later died of wounds.
USS PT-202	United States Navy	World War II: The Higgins 78'-class PT boat was sunk by a mine in the Gulf of Frejus off Saint-Tropez (43°23′N 06°46′E). One crew was killed.
USS PT-218	United States Navy	World War II: The Higgins 78'-class PT boat was sunk by a mine in the Gulf of Frejus off Saint-Tropez (43°23′N 06°46′E). The whole crew survived.
R 20	Kriegsmarine	World War II: The Type R-17 minesweeper was sunk by a mine off Sylt, Lower Saxony with the loss of 9 lives.
R 217	Kriegsmarine	World War II: The Type R-151 minesweeper was scuttled in the Seine at Paris.
RA 3	Kriegsmarine	World War II: The minesweeper was scuttled in the Seine at Paris.
RA 4	Kriegsmarine	World War II: The minesweeper, a former CH-5-class submarine chaser, was scuttled in the Seine at Paris.
RA 5	Kriegsmarine	World War II: The minesweeper was scuttled in the Seine at Paris.
RA 6	Kriegsmarine	World War II: The minesweeper, a former CH-44-class submarine chaser, was scuttled in the Seine at Paris.
RA 7	Kriegsmarine	World War II: The minesweeper, a former CH-44-class submarine chaser, was scuttled in the Seine at Paris.
RA 8	Kriegsmarine	World War II: The minesweeper, a former CH-44-class submarine chaser, was scuttled in the Seine at Paris.
Rovigo	Italy	World War II: The cargo ship was scuttled in Marseille, Bouches-du-Rhône, France.
Taito Maru	Imperial Japanese Navy	World War II: The auxiliary minesweeper (267 GRT) was torpedoed and sunk in the Yellow Sea off Incheon, Korea (36°16′N 125°49′E) by USS Croaker (United States Navy). Seven crew were killed.
Trémintin	French Navy	World War II: The accommodation ship, a former armored cruiser, was bombed and sunk by Royal Air Force aircraft at Brest, France.
USS YMS-24	United States Navy	World War II: The YMS-1-class minesweeper was sunk by a mine in the Gulf of Frejus off Saint-Tropez (43°25′N 06°43′E). Five crew were killed.

== 17 August ==
List of shipwrecks: 17 August 1944
Ship	State	Description
Artushof	Germany	World War II: The cargo ship was sunk at Stettin, Pomerania in an air raid by the Royal Air Force.
HMS BPC 1	Royal Navy	The landing craft tank was lost on this date. (See below LCF(L) 1)
F 619	Kriegsmarine	The Type C2 Marinefahrprahm was sunk on this date.
I-27	Soviet Navy	The KM-2 Type motor launch was lost on this date.
Jun Maru No. 2	Japan	World War II: The cargo ship was bombed and sunk in the Pacific Ocean south of "Miscol" by North American B-25 Mitchell aircraft of the Royal Netherlands Air Force.
KFK 510	Kriegsmarine	World War II: The naval trawler struck a mine and sank in the Piast Canal.
HMS LCF(L) 1	Royal Navy	The LCT-2-class landing craft tank (455/540 t, 1941) was lost on this date.
HMS LCT 631	Royal Navy	The Mk 4 landing craft tank (350/586 t, 1943) was lost on this date.
HMS LCT-1092	Royal Navy	The LCT-1-class landing craft tank sank off in the English Channel off Normandy, France. (Look 10/08/1944)
Lissa	Italy	World War II: The cargo liner was bombed and sunk by aircraft in Zara, Yugoslavia.
MAL 20	Kriegsmarine	World War II: The MAL 1A type landing fire support lighter was bombed by Soviet aircraft on the Emajõgi river between Lake Peipus and Tartu, Estonia. There were two killed and eleven wounded. She was towed to Tartu on 19 August and scuttled there the next day.
No. 28	Soviet Navy	The No. 16-class landing tender was lost on this date.
No. 108	Soviet Navy	The No. 16-class landing tender was lost on this date.
No. 211	Soviet Navy	The No. 19-class landing tender was lost on this date.
Otto Alfred Müller	Germany	World War II: The cargo ship was sunk at Stettin in an air raid by the Royal Air Force.
Peter Bornhofen	Germany	World War II: The cargo ship was bombed and sunk at Kirkenes, Norway by Soviet aircraft. There were one dead and two wounded.
Sebu	Germany	World War II: The cargo ship was bombed and sunk at Kirkenes in a Soviet air raid.
Skjervøy	Kriegsmarine	The ship was sunk at Hustadvika, Norway. (See below "V 6803 Burgunder")
TA35	Kriegsmarine	World War II: The torpedo boat, a former Rosolino Pilo-class destroyer, struck a mine, blew in half and sank in the Fasana Channel near the Brijuni Islands. 71 crew were killed.
Toni III	Germany	World War II: The tanker was scuttled at Port-de-Bouc, Bouches-du-Rhône, France by Vichy French forces. Although declared a total loss in April 1945, she was refloated in February 1947. Subsequently repaired and entered Swiss service in 1950 at Neuchâtel.
UJ 2223	Kriegsmarine	World War II: The Gabbiano-class corvette was sunk in an Allied air raid on Genoa, Italy.
UJ-6073 Nimet Allah	Kriegsmarine	World War II: Battle of La Ciotat: The armed yacht was shelled and sunk in the Mediterranean Sea off La Ciotat, Bouches-du-Rhône, France by HMS Aphis, HMS Scarab (both Royal Navy) and USS Endicott or USS Somers (both United States Navy).
UJ 6081	Kriegsmarine	World War II: Battle of Port Cros: The Gabbiano-class corvette was torpedoed and sunk in the Mediterranean Sea off Port Cros by HMS Aphis, HMS Scarab (both Royal Navy) and USS Somers (United States Navy).
UJ-6082	Kriegsmarine	World War II: Battle of La Ciotat: The Gabbiano-class corvette was shelled and sunk in the Mediterranean Sea off La Ciotat by USS Endicott (United States Navy).
Usko	Finland	World War II: The cargo ship was bombed and sunk by aircraft at Stettin, Germany. Wreck scrapped in 1945–1946.
V 6803 Burgunder	Kriegsmarine	World War II: The floating torpedo battery (151 GRT, 1915) was sunk on this date.
Yamateru Maru	Japan	World War II: The cargo ship was torpedoed and sunk in the Yellow Sea off Incheon, Korea by USS Croaker (United States Navy).

== 18 August ==
List of shipwrecks: 18 August 1944
Ship	State	Description
Alba Julia	Germany	World War II: The transport ship was bombed and sunk in a port. She was refloated in 1945. Subsequently repaired and entered Soviet service in 1947 as Nikolaev.
Capo Alga	Italy	World War II: The cargo ship was scuttled at Nantes, Loire-Inférieure, France. She was refloated in 1945 and scrapped in 1948.
Caroline	United States	The 61-gross register ton, 66.6-foot (20.3 m) fishing vessel was wrecked on Wolcott Reef (57°40′15″N 154°11′45″W) in the Shelikof Strait on the coast of Kodiak Island in the Territory of Alaska.
Eishin Maru	Japan	World War II: Convy HI 71: The cargo ship was torpedoed and sunk in the South China Sea by USS Rasher and USS Redfish (United States Navy).
Florida II	Germany	World War II: The cargo ship was sunk in an Allied air raid on Savona, Italy. She was refloated post-war and scrapped.
HMS Fratton	Royal Navy	World War II: The armed boarding vessel (757 GRT, 1925) was sunk in the English Channel off Normandy, France, by a Kriegsmarine Marder midget submarine.
I-O-48	Kriegsmarine	The Siebelgefäß landing craft was sunk on this date.
Kim Hup Soen	Japan	World War II: The junk was shelled and sunk in the Strait of Malacca (04°00′S 99°32′E) by HNLMS Zwaardvisch (Royal Netherlands Navy).
La Galissonnière	Kriegsmarine	World War II: The La Galissonnière-class cruiser was sunk in an American air raid on Toulon, Var, France.
HMS LCF (II)-1	Royal Navy	World War II: The landing craft was sunk in the English Channel by a Kriegsmarine Marder midget submarine. (Look "LCF(L)-1" 17/08/1944)
Leda	Germany	World War II: The cargo ship was sunk at Bremen in an air raid by the Royal Air Force.
Lennox	Norway	World War II: Operation Schneehuhn: The motor boat (50 GRT) was shelled and sunk in the Van Mijenfjord, Svalbard, by U-307 ( Kriegsmarine). All three crew survived.
M-27	Kriegsmarine	World War II: The minesweeper struck a mine and sank in the Gironde Estuary, France.
M 4207	Kriegsmarine	World War II: The minesweeper struck a mine and sank in the Gironde Estuary.
M 4618	Kriegsmarine	World War II: The minesweeper was sunk in an air raid on Brest, Finistère, France by the Royal Air Force.
HMMTB 707	Royal Navy	The Fairmile D motor torpedo boat (102/118 t, 1943) was sunk in the Atlantic Ocean north of Ireland in a collision with L'Escarmouche (Free French Naval Forces).
Nairung	United Kingdom	World War II: The cargo ship (5,414 GRT, 1942) was torpedoed and sunk in the Mozambique Channel (15°00′S 42°00′E) by U-862 ( Kriegsmarine) with the loss of all 92 crew. Nairung was on a voyage from Durban, Union of South Africa to Bombay, India.
Nansei Maru	Imperial Japanese Army	World War II: Convoy MI-12: The tanker was torpedoed and sunk in the South China Sea (08°39′N 116°39′E) by USS Ray (United States Navy). Three gunners and 23 crewmen were killed.
Natori	Imperial Japanese Navy	World War II: The Nagara-class cruiser was torpedoed and sunk in the Philippine Sea 200 nautical miles (370 km; 230 mi) east of Samar (12°29′N 128°49′E) by USS Hardhead (United States Navy) with the loss of 330 of her 438 crew. One hundred and eighty-three survivors in three boats rowed 300 nautical miles (560 km; 350 mi) to Mindanao, Philippines, arriving on 30 August. Ten of the party died during the voyage; four were rescued by USS Stingray (United States Navy) on 31 August, and 44 were rescued by USS Marshall (United States Navy) on 12 September, twelve of the party died earlier.
Numidia	Germany	World War II: The cargo ship was torpedoed and sunk in the Adriatic Sea off Poreč, Yugoslavia by HMMTB 295 and HMMTB 371 (all Royal Navy) with the loss of 14 lives, 5 Flak gunners and 9 sailors.
Olbers	Germany	World War II: The cargo ship was sunk at Bremen in an air raid by the Royal Air Force.
Philip Heineken	Germany	World War II: The cargo ship was sunk at Bremen in an air raid by the Royal Air Force.
R 218	Kriegsmarine	World War II: The minesweeper was torpedoed and sunk in the English Channel off Cap d'Antifer, Seine-Inférieure, France by HMMTB 208, HMMTB 209, HMMTB 210 and HMMTB 212 (all Royal Navy).
Rio de la Plata	Argentina	The passenger ship was sabotaged, caught fire at Acapulco, Mexico. She was towed out of port and sank 1 nautical mile (1.9 km) offshore.
Robin Gray	United States	World War II: The 1079 class cargo ship was sunk as a breakwater for Gooseberry No. 2 off Omaha Beach, Calvados, France.
Sperrbrecher 37 Kapolena	Kriegsmarine	World War II: The incomplete sperrbrecher was scuttled in the Charpentier Channel, off Saint-Nazaire, Loire-Inférieure, France. The wreck was broken up in 1951.
Sperrbrecher 152 Fauna	Germany	World War II: The incomplete sperrbrecher was sunk at Bremen in an air raid by the Royal Air Force.
Strasbourg	Vichy France	World War II: The Dunkerque-class battleship sank at Toulon following an American air raid on 15 August.
T22	Kriegsmarine	World War II: The Elbing-class torpedo boat wandered into a German minefield and sank in Narva Bay west of the Kurgalsky Peninsula with the loss of 143 lives.
T30	Kriegsmarine	World War II: The Elbing-class torpedo boat wandered into a German minefield and sank in Narva Bay west of the Kurgalsky Peninsula with the loss of 114 lives.
T32	Kriegsmarine	World War II: The Elbing-class torpedo boat wandered into a German minefield and sank in Narva Bay west of the Kurgalsky Peninsula with the loss of 137 lives.
Taiyō	Imperial Japanese Navy	World War II: Convoy HI-71: The Taiyō-class aircraft carrier was torpedoed and sunk in the South China Sea off Cape Bolinao, Luzon(18°10′N 120°22′E) by USS Rasher and USS Redfish (both United States Navy). Most of her crew were lost and about 790 passengers perished; but her captain and just over 400 crew and passengers survived.
Taketoyo Maru	Japan	World War II: The cargo ship was torpedoed and sunk in Pelawan Bay by USS Ray (United States Navy).
Teia Maru	Imperial Japanese Navy	World War II: Convoy HI-71: The troopship was torpedoed and sunk in the South China Sea off Cape Bolinao, Luzon (18°10′N 119°56′E) by USS Rasher and USS Redfish (both United States Navy). 2,316 troops, 275 other passengers, six guards, four gunners, ten specialists and 54 crewmen were killed.
Teiyo Maru	Japan	World War II: Convoy HI-71: The tanker was torpedoed and sunk in the South China Sea off Cape Bolinao, Luzon (18°10′N 120°22′E) by USS Rasher and USS Redfish (both United States Navy).
U-107	Kriegsmarine	World War II: The Type IXB submarine was depth charged and sunk in the Bay of Biscay (46°46′N 3°49′W) by a Short Sunderland aircraft of 201 Squadron, Royal Air Force with the loss of all 58 crew.
U-129	Kriegsmarine	World War II: The Type IXC submarine was scuttled at Lorient, Morbihan, France. The wreck was raised and scrapped in 1946.
U-621	Kriegsmarine	World War II: The Type VIIC submarine was depth charged and sunk in the Bay of Biscay off La Rochelle, Charente Maritime, France (45°52′N 2°36′W) by HMCS Chaudiere, HMCS Kootenay and HMCS Ottawa (all Royal Canadian Navy) with the loss of all 56 crew.
U-1054	Kriegsmarine	The Type VIIC submarine was in a collision with Peter Wessel (Germany and was severely damaged. She was consequently decommissioned.
UJ 1103 Gustav Korner	Kriegsmarine	The auxiliary submarine chaser was lost in a collision off Lista, Norway with the loss of 14 lives.
V 406 Hans Loh	Kriegsmarine	World War II: The Vorpostenboot struck a mine and sank in the Gironde Estuary with the loss of eighteen of her crew.
V 6112 Friese	Kriegsmarine	World War II: The Vorpostenboot was torpedoed and sunk off Vardø, Norway, (70°13′N 31°04′E) by M-201 (Soviet Navy). One of her 28 crew was killed.
Vesta	Germany	World War II: The cargo ship was sunk at Bremen in an air raid by the Royal Air Force. She was refloated post-war, repaired and returned to service.

== 19 August ==
List of shipwrecks: 19 August 1944
Ship	State	Description
Awa Maru	Japan	World War II: Convoy HI-71: The transport was torpedoed and damaged in the Pacific Ocean by USS Bluefish (United States Navy). She was beached near Port Currimao, Luzon. She was pulled off and towed to Manila, arriving on 21 August.
Colmar	Germany	World War II: The cargo ship was torpedoed and sunk in the Arctic Sea off Kirkenes, Norway by STS-206 or TKA-219 (both Soviet Navy) with the loss of all hands.
Commandant Teste	Kriegsmarine	World War II: The seaplane carrier was sunk by Allied bomber aircraft at Toulon, France. She was refloated in 1945 and scrapped in 1950.
F 941	Kriegsmarine	The Type D Marinefahrprahm was sunk on this date.
Harpagus	United Kingdom	World War II: The cargo ship (7,271 GRT, 1942) struck a mine in Seine Bay and broke in two. The bow section sank, the stern section was beached. It was later towed to the Tyne and a new bow section was fitted. The ship was returned to service as Treworlas.
Hayasui	Imperial Japanese Navy	Hayasui sinking World War II: Convoy HI-71: The Kazahaya-class fleet oiler was torpedoed and sunk in the Pacific Ocean (17°34′N 119°23′E) by USS Bluefish (United States Navy). Her captain was killed.
Jean Laborde	France	World War II: The cargo liner was scuttled in the Étang de Berre.
M 292	Kriegsmarine	World War II: The minesweeper was bombed and sunk in the Gironde Estuary by de Havilland Mosquito aircraft of Coastal Command, Royal Air Force.
M 4023	Kriegsmarine	World War II: The minesweeper was sunk at Brest, Finistère, France in an air raid by the Royal Air Force.
Noshiro Maru	Imperial Japanese Navy	World War II: Convoy HI-71: The Noshiro Maru-class transport was torpedoed and damaged in the Pacific Ocean by USS Bluefish (United States Navy). She was beached near Port Currimao, Luzon. Refloated and proceeded on to Santiago Bay and San Fernando, Luzon.
R 218	Kriegsmarine	World War II: The Type R-218 minesweeper was sunk in the English Channel by surface ships.
S 26	Kriegsmarine	World War II: The Type 1939/40 E-boat was sunk in the Sulina branch of the Danube by a Soviet air attack.
S 40	Kriegsmarine	World War II: The Type 1939/40 E-boat sunk in the Sulina branch by a Soviet air attack.
S 57	Kriegsmarine	World War II: The Type 1939 E-boat (102 GRT) was heavily damaged in the Adriatic Sea between Korčula and Dubrovnik, Yugoslavia by HMMGB 658, HMMTB 653 and HMMTB 675 (all Royal Navy), and was scuttled. Two crewmen were killed and nine wounded.
Saint Enogat	United Kingdom	World War II: Convoy ETC 70: The cargo ship (2,360 GRT, 1918) was torpedoed and sunk in the English Channel south east of St. Catherine's Point, Isle of Wight (50°16′N 0°50′W) by U-413 ( Kriegsmarine) with the loss of four of her 41 crew. Survivors were rescued by HMS Duke of Argyll (Royal Navy).
Tamatsu Maru	Imperial Japanese Army	World War II: Convoy HI-71: The Mayasan Maru-class landing craft depot ship was torpedoed and sunk in the South China Sea west of Vigan City, Philippines (17°34′N 119°24′E) by USS Spadefish (United States Navy). 4,755 troops and 135 crewmen were killed.
TKA-203	Soviet Navy	World War II: The A-2 (Higgins 78')-class motor torpedo boat was sunk in the Arctic Sea off Kirkenes, Norway by M 202 (both Kriegsmarine). Six crewmen were killed, nine were taken as prisoners of war.
U-123	Kriegsmarine	World War II: The Type IXB submarine was scuttled at Lorient, Morbihan, France. She was raised in 1945, repaired and entered Marine Nationale service as Blaison.
U-466	Kriegsmarine	World War II: The Type VIIC submarine was scuttled at Toulon, Var, France.
V 6102 Köln	Kriegsmarine	World War II: The Vorpostenboot was torpedoed and sunk in the Arctic Sea off Kirkenes, Norway by TK-222 and TKA-215 (Soviet Navy). Twenty crewmen killed, five wounded.
V 6112 Friese	Kriegsmarine	World War II: The Vorpostenboot was torpedoed and sunk in the Arctic Sea off Kirkenes, Norway by M-201 (Soviet Navy).
Wayfarer	United Kingdom	World War II: The cargo ship (5,068 GRT, 1925) was torpedoed and sunk 150 nautical miles (280 km) east of Portuguese East Africa (14°30′S 42°20′E) by U-862 ( Kriegsmarine) with the loss of 51 of the 62 people aboard.

== 20 August ==
List of shipwrecks: 20 August 1944
Ship	State	Description
Berwickshire	United Kingdom	World War II: Convoy DN 68: The cargo ship (7,464 GRT, 1912) was torpedoed and sunk in the Indian Ocean 400 nautical miles (740 km) east south east of Durban, South Africa (30°58′S 38°50′E) by U-861 ( Kriegsmarine) with the loss of eight of her 102 crew. Survivors were rescued by HMT Norwich City (Royal Navy).
Bourges	Germany	World War II: The cargo ship was scuttled at Port-Saint-Louis-du-Rhône, Bouches-du-Rhône, France. She was refloated on 25 December and subsequently scrapped.
Chuko Maru	Japan	World War II: The cargo ship was bombed and sunk in the South China Sea off Hong Kong by Consolidated B-24 Liberator aircraft of the United States Fourteenth Air Force.
Coral	United Kingdom	World War II: Convoy ETC 72: The coaster (638 GRT, 1919) was torpedoed and sunk in the English Channel south east of St. Catherine's Point, Isle of Wight (50°13′N 0°48′W) by U-764 ( Kriegsmarine) with the loss of six of her seventeen crew. Survivors were rescued by Roebuck (United Kingdom) and a Royal Navy motor launch.
Daronia	United Kingdom	World War II: Convoy DN 68: The tanker was torpedoed and damaged in the Indian Ocean 400 nautical miles (740 km) east of Durban, Union of South Africa by U-861 ( Kriegsmarine). Daronia put into Durban on 24 August. Subsequently repaired and returned to service.
F 568	Kriegsmarine	World War II: The Marinefährprahm was sunk at Constanța, Romania in a Soviet air raid.
F 886	Kriegsmarine	The Type D Marinefahrprahm was sunk on this date.
F 889	Kriegsmarine	The Type D Marinefahrprahm was sunk on this date.
F 925	Kriegsmarine	The Type DM minelayer Marinefahrprahm was sunk on this date.
Gonneville	France	World War II: The cargo ship was scuttled as a blockship at Marseille. The wreck was scrapped in situ 1944–46.
M 4214 Jean Marthe	Kriegsmarine	World War II: The naval trawler/auxiliary minesweeper was sunk at Les Sables-d'Olonne, Vendée, France in an air raid by the Royal Air Force.
No. 12	Imperial Japanese Navy	The T 51-class motor torpedo boat was lost on this date.
No. 107	Soviet Navy	The KM-4-class river minesweeping launch was sunk on this date.
NMS Năluca	Royal Romanian Navy	World War II: The Sborul-class torpedo boat was sunk at Constanța by Soviet aircraft.
Potenza	Italy	World War II: The cargo ship was scuttled at Port-Saint-Louis-du-Rhône, Bouches-du-Rhône, France. She was raised in 1947 and scrapped.
R 37	Kriegsmarine	World War II: The minesweeper was sunk at Constanța in a Soviet air raid.
Richard Montgomery	United States	Richard Montgomery in July 2011 World War II: The Liberty ship ran aground in the Thames Estuary (51°27′57″N 0°47′12″E) and was declared a total loss. She still remains there as of 17 September 2026 due to her cargo of live ammunition being deemed too dangerous to salvage.
S 42	Kriegsmarine	World War II: The Type 1939/40 torpedo boat burned during a Soviet air attack on the shipyard at Constanța where she was being repaired.
S 45	Kriegsmarine	World War II: The damaged Type 1939/40 motor torpedo boat was decommissioned at Constanța after being damaged earlier by a Soviet air attack.
S 52	Kriegsmarine	World War II: The Type 1939/40 motor torpedo boat was sunk at Constanța in a Soviet air attack.
S 131	Kriegsmarine	World War II: The Type 1939/40 motor torpedo boat was sunk at Constanța in a Soviet air attack.
Schnelles Geleitboot 16	Kriegsmarine	World War II: The Élan-class sloop was scuttled at Marseille, Bouches-du-Rhône.
Schnelles Geleitboot 17	Kriegsmarine	World War II: The Chamois-class aviso was scuttled west of Marseille.
Schnelles Geleitboot 22	Germany	World War II: The uncompleted Chamois-class minesweeping sloop was scuttled at Port-de-Bouc, Bouches-du-Rhône.
Schnelles Geleitboot 25	Germany	World War II: The uncompleted sloop was scuttled at Marseille.
SM 206	Kriegsmarine	World War II: The KFK-2-class naval drifter was sunk on this date.
U-9	Kriegsmarine	World War II: The Type IIB submarine was sunk in the Black Sea at Constanța by Soviet Air Force aircraft.
U-413	Kriegsmarine	World War II: The Type VIIC submarine was depth charged and sunk in the English Channel south of Brighton, Sussex, United Kingdom (50°21′N 0°01′W) by HMS Forester, HMS Vidette and HMS Wensleydale (all Royal Navy) with the loss of 45 of her 46 crew.
U-984	Kriegsmarine	World War II: The Type VIIC submarine was depth charged and sunk in the Bay of Biscay west of Brest, Finistère, France (48°16′N 5°33′W) by HMCS Chaudiere, HMCS Kootenay and HMCS Ottawa (all Royal Canadian Navy) with the loss of all 45 crew.
U-1229	Kriegsmarine	World War II: The Type IX submarine was sunk in the Atlantic Ocean (42°20′N 51°39′W) by Grumman TBM Avenger and Grumman F4F Wildcat aircraft based on USS Bogue (United States Navy) with the loss of eighteen of her 59 crew.
V 409 August Bösch	Kriegsmarine	World War II: The Vorpostenboot was sunk at Les Sables-d'Olonne in an air raid by the Royal Air Force.
Yamada Maru No. 3	Japan	World War II: The cargo ship was sunk in the Pacific Ocean north east of Ceram Island, Netherlands East Indies by Bristol Beaufighter aircraft of the Royal Australian Air Force.

== 21 August ==
List of shipwrecks: 21 August 1944
Ship	State	Description
HMCS Alberni	Royal Canadian Navy	World War II: The Flower-class corvette (950/1,280 t, 1941) was torpedoed and sunk in the English Channel (50°18′N 0°51′W) by U-480 ( Kriegsmarine) with the loss of 59 of her 90 crew. Survivors rescued by HMS MTB 469 and HMS MTB 470 (both Royal Navy).
Albula	Switzerland	World War II: The cargo ship was damaged in the port of Marseille, Bouches-du-Rhône, France when the retreating German troops blew up the quay Traverse d'Arenc. She sank in the harbour. The crew was forced by the Germans to leave the ship the day before.
Cap Corse	France	Cap Corse World War II: The passenger-cargo ship was scuttled at Marseille, Bouches-du-Rhône. She was scrapped in situ.
Durban Maru	Imperial Japanese Army	World War II: convoy MASA-10: The Delagoa Maru-class transport was torpedoed and sunk in the South China Sea off French Indochina (11°45′N 109°46′E) by USS Muskallunge (United States Navy). Six crewmen and 509 troops were killed.
Explorateur Grandidier	France	World War II: The passenger ship was scuttled at Marseille. The wreck was scrapped in 1948.
F 812	Kriegsmarine	World War II: The Type D Marinefahrprahm was sunk by an air attack on the Rhône river near Avignon, France.
F 814	Kriegsmarine	World War II: The Type D Marinefahrprahm was scuttled on the Rhône.
F 1166	Kriegsmarine	World War II: The Type D Marinefahrprahm was sunk by Allied aircraft off Malamocco, France. There was one dead and 10 wounded.
HMS HDML 1179	Royal Navy	The Harbour Defence Motor Launch (46/54 t, 1943) sank in a storm off Jamaica.
Karibisches Mer	Kriegsmarine	World War II: The tanker was scuttled as a blockship at Rouen, Seine-Inférieure, France.
Kinryo Maru	Japan	World War II: Convoy MI-12: The cargo ship was torpedoed and sunk in Paluan Bay (13°20′N 120°11′E) by USS Haddo (United States Navy). A total of 65 troops and three crewmen were killed.
HMS Kite	Royal Navy	World War II: The Black Swan-class sloop (1,350/1,880 t, 1943) was torpedoed and sunk in the Barents Sea by U-344 ( Kriegsmarine) with the loss of 203 of her 217 crew. Survivors were rescued by HMS Keppel (Royal Navy).
M 292	Kriegsmarine	World War II: The minesweeper was bombed and sunk in the Gironde Estuary, France, by de Havilland Mosquito aircraft of Coastal Command, Royal Air Force.
M 6029 Cap Noir	Kriegsmarine	The auxiliary minesweeper was sunk on this date.
Manø	United Kingdom	The cargo ship (1,418 GRT, 1925) was wrecked on Geirfuglasker. Iceland.
Norfolk Maru	Imperial Japanese Army	World War II: Convoy MI-12: The Nanman Maru-class auxiliary transport was torpedoed and sunk in Mindoro Strait (13°23′N 120°19′E) by USS Haddo (United States Navy). A gunner and sixteen crewmen were killed.
HMS Orchis	Royal Navy	World War II: The Flower-class corvette (925/1,170 t, 1940) was severely damaged by a mine and beached off Juno Beach, Calvados, France. Later declared a constructive total loss.
RA 259	Kriegsmarine	World War II: The VAS 301-class submarine chaser was sunk in Genoa Bay by Royal Navy ships.
T 155	Kriegsmarine	World War II: The torpedo boat struck a mine in the Baltic Sea off Griefswalder Oie and was severely damaged. She was declared a total loss.
Taketoyo Maru	Imperial Japanese Navy	World War II: Convoy MI-12: The tanker was torpedoed and sunk in Mindoro Strait (13°23′N 120°19′E) by USS Guitarro, USS Haddo and USS Ray (all United States Navy). Thirteen crewmen were killed.
U-230	Kriegsmarine	The Type VIIC submarine ran aground off Toulon, Var, France (43°07′N 06°00′E). All 50 crew survived. She was subsequently scuttled during Operation Dragoon.
Uga Maru	Japan	World War II: Convoy MI-12: The cargo ship was torpedoed and sunk in Paluan Bay (13°20′N 120°11′E) by USS Guitarro, USS Haddo and USS Ray (all United States Navy). Two gunners, 96 passengers and 29 crewmen were killed.
V 401 Jan Mayen	Kriegsmarine	World War II: The Vorpostenboot was scuttled at Bayonne, Basses-Pyrénées, France.
V 402 Dr. Adolf Spilker	Kriegsmarine	World War II: The Vorpostenboot was scuttled at Bayonne.
V 413 Ferdinand Niedermeyer	Kriegsmarine	World War II: The Vorpostenboot was sunk at Le Verdon-sur-Mer, Gironde by Bristol Beaufighter aircraft of 236 Squadron, Royal Air Force and 404 Squadron, Royal Canadian Air Force.
VAS 255	National Republican Navy	World War II: The VAS 301-class submarine chaser was sunk near Genoa by Royal Navy ships.
Viper	Kriegsmarine	World War II: The training ship was scuttled at Bayonne.
Z23	Kriegsmarine	World War II: The Type 1934A-class destroyer was sunk at La Pallice, Charente-Maritime, France in an air raid by the Royal Air Force.

== 22 August ==
- For the torpedoing of HMS Nabob see 30 September 1944

List of shipwrecks: 22 August 1944
Ship	State	Description
HMS Bickerton	Royal Navy	World War II: The Captain-class frigate (1,432/1,823 t, 1943) was torpedoed and damaged in the Barents Sea by U-354 ( Kriegsmarine). She was scuttled by HMS Vigilant (Royal Navy) at (71°41′N 19°11′E).
Chenonceaux	Germany	World War II: The troopship was scuttled at Marseille, Bouches-du-Rhône France. She was refloated in April 1948 and subsequently scrapped.
Claus	Germany	World War II: The cargo ship was bombed and sunk by aircraft at Saint-Malo, Ille-et-Vilaine, France.
Eisbär	Germany	World War II: The cargo ship struck a mine and sank off Kristiansand, Norway.
F 859	Kriegsmarine	The Type D Marinefahrprahm was sunk on this date.
F 883	Kriegsmarine	The Type D Marinefahrprahm was wrecked on this date.
F 940	Kriegsmarine	The Type D Marinefahrprahm was sunk on this date.
Freigelet	Germany	World War II: The cargo ship was damaged by an explosion on the quayside at Marseille. She sprang a leak and capsized. She was refloated on 26 August 1946. Subsequently repaired and returned to French service in 1948 as Djenné.
Hakko Maru No. 2	Imperial Japanese Navy	World War II: Convoy TAMA-24A: The Standard Merchant Type 1TL tanker was torpedoed and damaged in Pacific Ocean (18°48′N 120°46′E) by USS Spadefish (United States Navy) and beached in Pasaquin Bay, Luzon, Philippines. Later refloated but wrecked by heavy swells while still in Pasaquin Bay on 18 September 1944.
Hiburi	Imperial Japanese Navy	World War II: The Hiburi-class escort ship was torpedoed and sunk in the Philippine Sea off Bataan, Philippines (14°15′N 120°25′E) by USS Harder (United States Navy). One hundred and fifty-four crewmen were killed and wounded.
Iméréthie II	France	The ship was scuttled at Marseille. She was refloated on 25 October and subsequently scrapped.
Jean Labourde	France	World War II: The ship was scuttled at Marseille. She was refloated in 1946 and subsequently scrapped.
HMS Loyalty	Royal Navy	World War II: The Algerine-class minesweeper (940/1,225 t, 1943) was torpedoed and sunk in the English Channel south east of the Isle of Wight (50°09′N 0°41′W) by U-480 ( Kriegsmarine) with the loss of 55 of her 85 crew.
M 4465 Frisa IV	Kriegsmarine	The guard ship was sunk on this date.
Marechal Lyautey	France	World War II: The cargo liner was scuttled at Marseille. The wreck was scrapped in 1947–48.
Mariette Pacha	France	World War II: The cargo ship was scuttled at Marseille. The wreck was scrapped in 1948.
Massalia	Germany	World War II: The accommodation ship was scuttled at Marseille. She was refloated post-war and scrapped.
Matsuwa	Imperial Japanese Navy	World War II: The Etorofu-class escort ship was torpedoed and sunk in the Philippine Sea off Bataan (14°15′N 120°25′E) by USS Harder (United States Navy). One hundred and thirty-four crewmen, including her captain, were killed.
HMS MTB 243	Royal Navy	World War II: The Vosper 72'-class motor torpedo boat (39/47 t, 1942) was expended as a target in the Mediterranean Sea.
Nansatsu Maru No. 2	Japan	World War II: The cargo ship was torpedoed and sunk in the Pacific Ocean by USS Tang (United States Navy).
Ole Wegger	Germany	World War II: The tanker (12,201 GRT, 1914) was scuttled as a blockship in the River Seine at Sahurs, Seine-Inférieure, France. She was raised in August 1945 but found to be uneconomic to repair and was scrapped in 1947.
Orvieto	Italy	World War II: The cargo ship was scuttled at Marseille. She was refloated in 1945 and scrapped.
Platon	Germany	World War II: The cargo ship was scuttled at Marseille. She was refloated on 1 July 1945. Consequently condemned and scrapped.
R 51	Kriegsmarine	World War II: The Type R-41 minesweeper was scuttled at Rouen, France.
RA 251	Kriegsmarine	World War II: The RA 251-class minesweeper, a former VAS 301-class submarine chaser was sunk in Genoa Bay by Royal Navy ships.
RA 255	Kriegsmarine	World War II: The RA 251-class minesweeper was sunk in the Mediterranean Sea off Antibes, Alpes-Maritimes, France in a battle with Royal Navy ships.
RA 259	Kriegsmarine	World War II: The RA 251-class minesweeper was sunk in the Mediterranean Sea off Antibes in a battle with Royal Navy ships.
Randazzo	Germany	World War Ii: The cargo ship was scuttled at Marseille. She was refloated in 1947 and scrapped.
S 148	Kriegsmarine	World War II: The Schnellboot struck a mine and sank in the Black Sea off Sulina, Romania.
Sado	Imperial Japanese Navy	World War II: The Etorofu-class escort ship was torpedoed and sunk in the Philippine Sea off Bataan (14°15′N 120°25′E) by USS Haddo and USS Harder (both United States Navy). 73 crewmen were killed.
Saint Cyrille	France	World War II: The cargo ship was scuttled at Marseille. She was refloated in 1948 and scrapped.
Schnelles Geleitboot 16	Kriegsmarine	World War II: The escort ship was scuttled at Marseille. The wreck was scrapped in 1945.
Sinaia	Germany	World War II: The hospital ship was scuttled at Marseille. She was refloated on 9 December 1946. Declared a total loss, she was scrapped in 1953.
Sugi Maru No.5	Japan	World War II: The cargo ship was torpedoed and sunk in the Pacific Ocean (11°40′N 92°45′E) by HMS Statesman (Royal Navy).
Tempo I	Germany	World War II: The tanker was scuttled at Marseille. She was raised in April 1946, but was declared a total loss on 6 June and subsequently scrapped.
Tonan Maru No. 2	Imperial Japanese Navy	World War II: Convoy TAMO-23: The Tonan Maru No. 2-class auxiliary oiler (19,262 GRT 1937) was torpedoed and sunk in South China Sea (29°53′N 125°19′E) by USS Pintado (United States Navy). Four crewmen were killed.
Tsushima Maru	Imperial Japanese Army	World War II: Convoy Namo 103: The Tsushima Maru-class auxiliary transport was torpedoed and sunk south west of Suwanosejima by USS Bowfin (United States Navy) with the loss of 1,529 passengers, including 682 children being evacuated from Okinawa, and 21 gunners and 24 crewmen. Later, only 59 of the children were saved.
U-344	Kriegsmarine	World War II: The Type VIIC submarine was depth charged and sunk in the Barents Sea north east of Bear Island, Norway (74°54′N 15°26′E) by Fairey Swordfish aircraft of 825 Squadron, Fleet Air Arm based on HMS Vindex (Royal Navy) with the loss of all 50 crew.
V 405 J. Hinrich Wilhelms	Kriegsmarine	Thevorpostenboot was scuttled at Bordeaux, Gironde, France.
V 435	Kriegsmarine	The KFK-2-class naval drifter/Vorpostenboot was sunk on this date.
W 22	Imperial Japanese Navy	World War II: The minesweeper was torpedoed and sunk in the Pacific Ocean off the Mandate Islands by USS Batfish (United States Navy).

== 23 August ==
List of shipwrecks: 23 August 1944
Ship	State	Description
Asakaze	Imperial Japanese Navy	World War II: The Kamikaze-class destroyer was torpedoed and sunk in Paluan Bay 18 nautical miles (33 km) south west of Cape Bolinao, Luzon, Philippines by USS Haddo (United States Navy).
Baltic	Sweden	World War II: The fishing trawler (39 GRT) struck a mine and sank west of Hamneskär with the loss of all five crew.
Christie	Norway	World War II: The motor boat was bombed and sunk in the Arctic Ocean by Douglas A-20 Havoc aircraft of the Soviet Naval Air Force.
Clipper	Norway	World War II: The motor boat was bombed and sunk in the Arctic Ocean by Douglas A-20 Havoc aircraft of the Soviet Naval Air Force.
Fort Yale	United Kingdom	World War II: Convoy ETC 72: The Fort ship (7,134 GRT, 1942) struck a mine in the English Channel with the loss of one of her 67 crew. She straggled behind the convoy and was taken in tow by USS Farallon (United States Navy) and HMS Hudson (Royal Navy). Fort Yale was torpedoed and sunk in 17 nautical miles (31 km) south east of St. Catherine's Point, Isle of Wight (50°23′N 0°55′W) by U-480 ( Kriegsmarine). The 66 survivors were rescued by three Royal Navy LCIs.
Ha-65	Imperial Japanese Navy	Convoy 3823: The Type C Kō-hyōteki-class midget submarine was lost in a typhoon off Japan while under tow by Fuji Maru (Imperial Japanese Navy) when the tow line parted.
Ha-73	Imperial Japanese Navy	Convoy 3823: The Type C Kō-hyōteki-class midget submarine was lost in a typhoon off Japan while under tow by Kiri Maru No. 1 GO (Imperial Japanese Navy) when the tow line parted.
Livasbjer	Norway	World War II: The motor boat was bombed and sunk in the Arctic Ocean by Douglas A-20 Havoc aircraft of the Soviet Naval Air Force.
M 344	Kriegsmarine	World War II: The minesweeper was scuttled at Rochefort, Charente-Maritime, France.
S 72	Kriegsmarine	World War II: The Type 1939/40 E-boat was sunk in an air attack.
Shonan Maru No. 5	Imperial Japanese Navy	World War II: The auxiliary submarine chaser was sunk by Consolidated B-24 Liberator aircraft off Chichi Jima, Bonin Islands (27°50′N 142°06′E).
TA9	Kriegsmarine	World War II: The La Melpomène-class torpedo boat was sunk in an American air raid on Toulon, Var, France.
Tsukushi Maru	Japan	World War II: The troopship was torpedoed and sunk in the Pacific Ocean off Honshu by USS Tang (United States Navy).
U-180	Kriegsmarine	World War II: The Type IXD1 submarine was sunk in the Bay of Biscay with the loss of all 56 crew.
V 702 Memel, V 729 Marie Simone and V 730 Michel François	Kriegsmarine	World War II: Battle of Audierne Bay: The Vorpostenboots were shelled and sunk off Audierne, Finistère, France by HMS Mauritius, HMS Ursa (both Royal Navy) and HMCS Iroquois (Royal Canadian Navy).
V 717 Alfred III	Kriegsmarine	World War II: The Battle of Audierne Bay: The Alfred I-class Vorpostenboot was shelled and sunk off Audierne, Finistère, France by HMS Mauritius, HMS Ursa (both Royal Navy) and HMCS Iroquois (Royal Canadian Navy).
V 720	Kriegsmarine	World War II: The Battle of Audierne Bay: The Ekwator-class Vorpostenboot was shelled and sunk off Audierne, Finistère, France by HMS Mauritius, HMS Ursa (both Royal Navy) and HMCS Iroquois (Royal Canadian Navy).
V 721	Kriegsmarine	World War II: The Battle of Audierne Bay: The Ekwator-class Vorpostenboot was shelled and sunk off Audierne, Finistère, France by HMS Mauritius, HMS Ursa (both Royal Navy) and HMCS Iroquois (Royal Canadian Navy).
Yashida Maru No. 3	Japan	World War II: The cargo ship was torpedoed and sunk in the East China Sea off Keelung, Formosa by USS Ronquil (United States Navy).

== 24 August ==
List of shipwrecks: 24 August 1944
Ship	State	Description
AF 41	Kriegsmarine	World War II: The Artilleriefährprahm was sunk at IJmuiden, North Holland, Netherlands in an air raid by the Royal Air Force. Later refloated, repaired and returned to service.
Dessau	Germany	World War II: Convoy W 127: The cargo ship was torpedoed and damaged in the Tanafjord by Soviet submarine S-15 (2) (Soviet Navy).
Empire Roseberry	United Kingdom	World War II: The Empire Pym-type tanker (2,370 GRT, 1944) struck a mine and sank in the Seine Bay.
F 820	Kriegsmarine	The Type DM minelayer Marinefahrprahm was sunk on this date.
F 938	Kriegsmarine	The Type DM minelayer Marinefahrprahm was sunk on this date.
Fukurei Maru	Imperial Japanese Navy	World War II: Convoy MOTA-23: The transport was torpedoed and damaged by USS Ronquil (United States Navy). The partially flooded ship drifted ashore with 210 troops and four crewmen killed. The ship was abandoned about three months later.
USS Harder	United States Navy	World War II: The Gato-class submarine was depth charged and sunk in Dasol Bay by Imperial Japanese Navy ships with the loss of all 60 crew.
Havre Maru	Imperial Japanese Army	World War II: The Yoshida Maru No. 1-class auxiliary transport (5,467 GRT) was driven aground by a heavy rainstorm on a sand bar 2,000 metres (6,600 ft) north east of Jolo (06°03′N 120°59′E). The ship could not be refloated. The wreck was bombed and heavily damaged on 30 October, and was abandoned as a constructive total loss.
Kelmscott	United Kingdom	The cargo ship (7,039 GRT, 1943) collided with the Liberty ship William Leavitt (United States) in the Atlantic Ocean off Atlantic City, New Jersey, United States and was beached. Later repaired and returned to service.
NMS Lascar Catargiu	Royal Romanian Navy	World War II: The Lascar Catargiu-class river monitor was sunk in the Danube by Soviet aircraft. Raised, repaired and returned to service in 1953.
M 4004 Ibis	Kriegsmarine	World War II: The minesweeper was sunk at Brest, Finistère, France in an air raid by the Royal Air Force.
M 4453 Diester	Kriegsmarine	The auxiliary minesweeper was sunk on this date.
NMS Mihail Kogălniceanu	Royal Romanian Navy	World War II: The Lascar Catargiu-class river monitor was sunk in the Danube by Soviet aircraft. Raised, repaired and returned to service 1953.
Ölschiff 1	Kriegsmarine	World War II: The tanker was scuttled off Rouen, Seine-Inférieure, France. She was refloated on 20 April 1946 and was beached on 15 August at Hénouville, Seine-Inférieure for scrapping.
R-219	Kriegsmarine	World War II: The Type R-218 minesweeper was sunk off Cape Antifer by surface ships.
SG 14	Kriegsmarine	World War II: The Chamois-class aviso was bombed and sunk in Acqua Fredda Bay, Italy by Allied aircraft. Eight crew were killed.
Sahale	United States	World War II: The cargo ship was sunk as a breakwater off Omaha Beach, Calvados, France.
SM 221	Kriegsmarine	World War II: The RA 51-class minesweeper was sunk in an air attack on this date.
Shiretoko Maru	Japan	World War II: The cargo ship was sunk at Padang, Netherlands East Indies by Fleet Air Arm aircraft based on HMS Indomitable and HMS Victorious (both Royal Navy).
Shonan Maru No.5	Imperial Japanese Navy	World War II: The auxiliary submarine chaser was bombed and sunk at Chichi-jima by Consolidated B-24 Liberator aircraft of the United States Fourteenth Air Force.
T24	Kriegsmarine	World War II: The Elbing-class torpedo boat was bombed and sunk at Le Verdon-sur-Mer or Soulac-sur-Mer, Gironde, France by Bristol Beaufighter aircraft of 236 Squadron, Royal Air Force and 404 Squadron, Royal Canadian Air Force. 18 crew were killed.
Toan Maru	Japan	World War II: The cargo ship was torpedoed and sunk in the South China Sea off Formosa by USS Sailfish (United States Navy).
Tosei Maru	Japan	World War II: The cargo ship was torpedoed and sunk in the Pacific Ocean off Cape Erimo, Hokkaidō by USS Seal (United States Navy).
U-354	Kriegsmarine	World War II: The Type VIIC submarine was depth charged and sunk in the Barents Sea (72°49′N 30°41′E) by HMS Keppel, HMS Loch Dunvegan, HMS Mermaid and HMS Peacock (all Royal Navy) with the loss of all 51 crew.
U-445	Kriegsmarine	World War II: The Type VIIC submarine was depth charged and sunk in the Bay of Biscay west of Saint-Nazaire, Loire-Inférieure, France (47°21′N 5°50′W) by HMS Louis (Royal Navy) with the loss of all 52 crew.
V 1401	Kriegsmarine	World War II: The Vorpostenboot was sunk at IJmuiden in an air raid by the Royal Air Force.
Vita	Bulgaria	World War II: The sailing vessel was sunk in the Black Sea by Shch-215 (Soviet Navy).
Yosida Maru No. 3	Imperial Japanese Navy	World War II: Convoy MOTA-23: The transport was torpedoed and sunk by USS Ronquil (United States Navy). Ninety-six of 99 troops, ten gunners and all 70 crewmen were killed.
Z37	Kriegsmarine	World War II: The Type 1936A-class destroyer was scuttled at Bordeaux, France.

== 25 August ==
List of shipwrecks: 25 August 1944
Ship	State	Description
Addis Abeba	Italy	World War II: The trawler was torpedoed and sunk in the Adriatic Sea between Venice and Trieste by HMMTB 373 (Royal Navy) with the loss of 5 lives.
Batopahat Maru	Japan	World War II: Convoy TAMA-24: The Kinrei Maru-class ore carrier was torpedoed and sunk north north east of Cape Bojeador, Luzon, Philippines (18°31′N 120°32′E) by USS Picuda (United States Navy). Seventeen crewmen and an unknown number of troops were killed.
F 126	Kriegsmarine	The Siebel ferry was sunk on this date.
F 521	Kriegsmarine	The Type B Marinefahrprahm was sunk on this date.
F 848	Kriegsmarine	World War II: The Type D Marinefahrprahm was intentionally run aground south of Varna. Salvaged and put in Soviet service as BDB-4 (Soviet Navy) in October 1944.
F 895	Kriegsmarine	The Type D Marinefahrprahm was wrecked on this date.
F 908	Kriegsmarine	The Type DM minelayer Marinefahrprahm was sunk on this date.
Frisco	Italy	World War II: The tanker was scuttled as a blockship at Bourg, Gironde, France. She was refloated in 1945 and scrapped.
KKO-2	Soviet Navy	World War II: The survey ship was torpedoed and sunk in the Gulf of Finland (60°02′N 29°04′E) by U-242 ( Kriegsmarine) with the loss of 25 of her 32 crew.
Kotoku Maru	Japan	World War II: Convoy TAMA-24: The transport was torpedoed and sunk off north north east of Cape Bojeador (18°42′N 120°49′E) by USS Picuda (United States Navy). Sixteen crewmen were killed.
HMS LCS(M) 42	Royal Navy	The landing craft assault (11/13 t, 1944) was lost on this date.
HMS LCT 1074	Royal Navy	World War II: The landing craft tank (350/586 t, 1943) was torpedoed and sunk in the English Channel (49°50′N 0°45′W) by U-764 ( Kriegsmarine) with the loss of ten of her fourteen crew.
M-266	Kriegsmarine	World War II: The Type 1940 minesweeper was sunk at Kiel, Schleswig-Holstein by British aircraft. Later raised.
M-304	Kriegsmarine	World War II: The Type 1940 minesweeper was scuttled at Bordeaux, Gironde, France.
M-344	Kriegsmarine	World War II: The Type 1940 minesweeper was scuttled at Bordeaux, France.
M-347	Kriegsmarine	World War II: The Type 1940 minesweeper was sunk off Engelsmanplaat, Friesland, Netherlands by rocket-armed Bristol Beaufighter aircraft of the Royal Air Force.
M-363	Kriegsmarine	World War II: The Type 1940 minesweeper was scuttled at Bordeaux, France.
M-463	Kriegsmarine	World War II: The Type 1940 minesweeper was scuttled at Bordeaux, France.
M 3857 Rotherbaum	Kriegsmarine	The auxiliary minesweeper was sunk on this date.
M 4040 Odenwald	Kriegsmarine	World War II: The auxiliary minesweeper was sunk at Brest, Finistère, France in an air raid by the Royal Air Force.
M 4202	Kriegsmarine	World War II: The minesweeper was scuttled at La Rochelle, Charente-Maritime, France.
M 4404 Les Illates	Kriegsmarine	The naval trawler/auxiliary minesweeper was lost on this date.
Nanko Maru No. 8	Japan	World War II: The coaster was torpedoed and sunk in the Pacific Ocean by USS Tang (United States Navy).
Orminster	Brazil	World War II: Convoy FTM 74: The cargo ship (5,712 GRT, 1914) straggled behind the convoy. She was torpedoed and sunk in the English Channel 35 nautical miles (65 km) north west of Cap d'Antifer, Seine Maritime, France by U-480 ( Kriegsmarine) with the loss of four of her 63 crew. Survivors were rescued by HMS Damsay and HMS Pennywort (both Royal Navy).
Pruth	Kriegsmarine	The Type A Marinefahrprahm was sunk on this date.
R 203 and R 205	Kriegsmarine	World War II: The Type R-151 minesweepers were scuttled in the Black Sea off Constanța, Romania. R 205 was raised, repaired, and put in Soviet service as BO-52.
Rastenburg	Germany	World War II: The cargo ship was scuttled as a blockship at Bassens, Gironde, France. Wreck scrapped in 1945.
S 28	Kriegsmarine	World War II: The damaged Type 1939/40 torpedo boat was scuttled at Constanța.
S 49	Kriegsmarine	World War II: The torpedo boat was scuttled at Constanța.
S 72	p	World War II: The torpedo boat was scuttled at Constanța.
S 91	Kriegsmarine	World War II: The Type 1939/40 motor torpedo boat was sunk by British ships.
S 149	Kriegsmarine	World War II: The Type 1939/40 motor torpedo boat was sunk by aircraft, or scuttled at Constanța.
S 501, S 502, S 503, S 504, S 505, S 506, and S 507	Kriegsmarine	World War II: The MAS boats were scuttled at Constanța.
Scharlachberger	Germany	World War II: The cargo ship was scuttled as a blockship in the Gironde, France. She was refloated in 1945 and scrapped in 1946.
Schwarzes Meer	Germany	World War II: The cargo ship was scuttled off Bordeaux. She was refloated on 2 March 1945 and subsequently scrapped.
SM 101	Kriegsmarine	The KFK-2-class naval drifter was sunk on this date.
Sperrbrecher 14 Bockenheim	Kriegsmarine	World War II: The Sperrbrecher (7,019 GRT, 1929) was sunk as a blockship in the Gironde. Raised in 1946 and scrapped in 1948.
Sperrbrecher 68 Flora	Kriegsmarine	World War II: The Sperrbrecher was scuttled at Saint-Nazaire, Loire-Inférieure, France.
Sperrbrecher 122 Cap Hadid	Kriegsmarine	World War II: The Sperrbrecher was scuttled at Saint-Nazaire. She was refloated in June 1946, repaired and returned to French service as Cap Hadid.
Sperrbrecher 136 Phönix	Kriegsmarine	World War II: The Sperrbrecher was scuttled at Saint-Nazaire.
Sperrbrecher 162 Delia	Kriegsmarine	World War II: The Sperrbrecher was sunk at Brest in an air raid by the Royal Air Force.
Sperrbrecher 180 Midas	Kriegsmarine	World War II: The Sperrbrecher was sunk by Allied aircraft at Brest.
TA13	Kriegsmarine	World War II: The La Melpomène-class torpedo boat was scuttled at Toulon, Var, France.
U-18	Kriegsmarine	World War II: The Type IIB submarine was scuttled at Constanța, Romania.
U-24	Kriegsmarine	World War II: The Type IIB submarine was scuttled at Constanța.
U-178	Kriegsmarine	World War II: The Type IXD2 submarine was scuttled at Bordeaux, Gironde. The wreck was raised and scrapped in 1947.
U-667	Kriegsmarine	World War II: The Type VIIC submarine struck a mine and sank in the Bay of Biscay off La Rochelle, Charente-Maritime, France (46°00′N 1°30′W) with the loss of all 45 crew.
UIT-21	Kriegsmarine	World War II: The Calvi-class submarine was scuttled at Bordeaux.
UJ 105	Kriegsmarine	World War II: The submarine chaser struck a mine and sank in the Black Sea off Varna, Romania.
UJ 115 Rosita	Kriegsmarine	World War II: The submarine chaser was scuttled at Constanța.
UJ 116 Xanten	Kriegsmarine	World War II: The submarine chaser was scuttled in Bulgarian waters.
UJ 301	Kriegsmarine	World War II: The KFK-2-class naval drifter/submarine chaser was scuttled at Constanța.
UJ 302	Kriegsmarine	World War II: The KFK-2-class naval drifter/submarine chaser was scuttled at Constanța.
Usaramo	Regia Marina	World War II: The submarine depot ship was scuttled as a blockship at Lagrange, Gironde.
V 6713	Kriegsmarine	The KFK-2-class naval drifter/Vorpostenboot was sunk on this date.
VRD-96 Del'fin	Soviet Navy	World War II: The barge was torpedoed and sunk in the Gulf of Finland (60°02′N 29°04′E) by U-242 ( Kriegsmarine).
Yūnagi	Imperial Japanese Navy	World War II: Convoy TAMA-24: The Kamikaze-class destroyer was torpedoed and sunk in the Pacific Ocean 20 nautical miles (37 km) north north east of Cape Bojeador (18°46′N 120°46′E) by USS Picuda (United States Navy) with the loss of 32 crewmen. 202 survivors including her commanding officer were rescued by CD-35 (Imperial Japanese Navy).
Z24	Kriegsmarine	World War II: The destroyer was bombed and sunk by aircraft off Le Verdon-sur-Mer, Gironde by Bristol Beaufighter aircraft of 236 Squadron, Royal Air Force and 404 Squadron, Royal Canadian Air Force.

== 26 August ==
List of shipwrecks: 26 August 1944
Ship	State	Description
AF 51	Kriegsmarine	World War II: The Artilleriefährprahm was scuttled off Varna, Bulgaria.
AF 53	Kriegsmarine	World War II: The Artilleriefährprahm was scuttled off Varna, Bulgaria.
AF 56	Kriegsmarine	World War II: The Artilleriefährprahm was scuttled off Varna, Bulgaria.
AF 97, AF 105, AF 110, and AF 111	Kriegsmarine	World War II: The Artilleriefährprahme were sunk in the English Channel off Fécamp, Seine-Inférieure, France, by Royal Navy motor torpedo boats and United States Navy PT boats. One hundred and twenty survivors were rescued by S 174 and S 177 (both Kriegsmarine).
Ashmun J. Clough	United Kingdom	World War II: Convoy EBC 82: The Type N3-S-A1 cargo ship (1,791 GRT, 1943) was torpedoed and sunk in the English Channel north of Cherbourg, Manche, France (50°10′N 1°41′W) by U-989 (Kriegsmarine) with the loss of sixteen of her 35 crew. Survivors were rescued by HMML 450 (Royal Navy).
Baltenland	Kriegsmarine	The auxiliary river gunboat was sunk on this date.
Burano	Kriegsmarine	World War II: The tanker was scuttled as a blockship at Pauillac, Gironde, France. She was refloated in 1946 and scrapped.
Dresden	Germany	World War II: The cargo ship was scuttled, either in the Gironde or at Bordeaux, Gironde. She was refloated in September 1944, repaired and entered French service in 1946 as Doba.
Elsa Essberger	Germany	World War II: The cargo ship was scuttled as a blockship in the Gironde at Lagrange.
Exford	United States	World War II: The 1022 Hog Islander class cargo ship was sunk as a breakwater off Utah Beach, Calvados, France. She was refloated in 1951, but collided with a sunken Phoenix Cassion and sank again. Upper works scrapped in place.
F 576	Kriegsmarine	The Type C2 Marinefahrprahm was wrecked on this date.
M 262	Kriegsmarine	World War II: The minesweeper was scuttled, either in the Gironde or at Bordeaux.
M 304	Kriegsmarine	World War II: The minesweeper was scuttled, either in the Gironde or at Bordeaux.
M 363	Kriegsmarine	World War II: The minesweeper was scuttled, either in the Gironde or at Bordeaux.
M 4043 Pommern	Kriegsmarine	World War II: The minesweeper struck a mine and sank in the English Channel off La Pallice, Seine-Inférieure, France.
M 4631	Kriegsmarine	World War II: The minesweeper was scuttled, either in the Gironde or at Bordeaux.
MAL 2	Kriegsmarine	World War II: The MAL 1 type landing fire support lighter ran aground near Shabla Lighthouse, Bulgaria, and was scuttled by her crew.
Nord	Soviet Navy	World War II: The hydrographic survey ship was shelled and sunk in the Kara Sea (75°35′N 89°50′E) by U-957 ( Kriegsmarine) with the loss of eighteen of her 22 crew. Survivors were taken aboard U-957 as prisoners of war.
Nordmeer	Germany	World War II: The tanker was scuttled as a blockship at Bassens, Gironde. She was refloated in February 1945, repaired and entered French service in February 1948 as Artvine.
Osorno	Germany	World War II: The cargo ship was scuttled, either in the Gironde or at Bordeaux. She was later refloated and scrapped.
Samidare	Imperial Japanese Navy	World War II: After running aground on Velasco Reef off Palau on 19 August, the Shiratsuyu-class destroyer was torpedoed by USS Batfish (United States Navy) with the aft section sinking in the Pacific Ocean (8°30′N 134°37′E). Three crew killed and 34 others were reported missing. Survivors were rescued by Take (Imperial Japanese Navy).
SM 106	Kriegsmarine	The KFK-2-class naval drifter was sunk on this date.
Sperrbrecher 1 Saar	Kriegsmarine	World War II: The Sperrbrecher was sunk at Brest, Finistère, France in an air raid by the Royal Air Force.
Sperrbrecher 3	Kriegsmarine	World War II: The Sperrbrecher was scuttled off Bordeaux (44°50′N 0°34′W). She was refloated on 9 July 1947. Subsequently repaired and entered French service in 1951 as Nicole Schiaffino.
Sperrbrecher 14 Bockenheim	Kriegsmarine	World War II: The Sperrbrecher was scuttled off Bordeaux. The wreck was later refloated, and was scrapped in 1949.
Sperrbrecher 135 Adolph Kirsten	Kriegsmarine	World War II: The Sperrbrecher was bombed and sunk at Brest in an air raid by the Royal Air Force.
T-45 Antikajnen	Soviet Navy	World War II: The auxiliary minesweeper was torpedoed and sunk in Narva Bay by U-745 (Kriegsmarine).
U-188	Kriegsmarine	World War II: The Type IXC/40 submarine was scuttled at Bordeaux, Gironde, France. The wreck was raised in 1947 and scrapped.
V 404 Baden	Kriegsmarine	World War II: The Vorpostenboot was scuttled at Bordeaux.
V 411 Saarland	Kriegsmarine	World War II: The Vorpostenboot was sunk at Le Verdon-sur-Mer, Gironde by Bristol Beaufighter aircraft of 236 Squadron, Royal Air Force and 404 Squadron, Royal Canadian Air Force.
V 2009 Niedersachsen	Kriegsmarine	World War II: The Vorpostenboot was sunk in the Scheldt by Royal Navy motor torpedo boats.
Vojvoda	Kriegsmarine	The auxiliary river minesweeper was sunk on this date.

== 27 August ==
List of shipwrecks: 27 August 1944
Ship	State	Description
AF 13, AF 98 and AF 108	Kriegsmarine	World War II: The Artilleriefährprahme were sunk in the English Channel off Fécamp, Seine-Inférieure, France by Royal Navy motor torpedo boats and United States Navy PT boats.
HMS Britomart	Royal Navy	World War II: The Halcyon-class minesweeper (815/1,350 t, 1939) was bombed and damaged in the English Channel off Cap-d'Antifer, Seine-Inférieure, France by Hawker Typhoon aircraft of the Royal Air Force with the loss of 14 of her 80 crew. Survivors were rescued by HMT Lord Ashfield (Royal Navy). HMS Britomart was scuttled by HMS Pytchley.
Clemenceau	French Navy	World War II: The incomplete Richelieu-class battleship was bombed and sunk at Brest, Finistère, France by United States Army Air Forces aircraft. The wreck was scrapped post-war.
F 893	Kriegsmarine	The Type D Marinefahrprahm was sunk on this date.
HMS Hussar	Royal Navy	World War II: The Halcyon-class minesweeper (815/1,370 t, 1935) was bombed and damaged in the English Channel off Cap-d'Antifer by Hawker Typhoon aircraft of the Royal Air Force with the loss of 55 of her 80 crew. Survivors were rescued by HMT Colsay (Royal Navy). HMS Hussar was scuttled by HMS Pytchley.
Lavosier	Kriegsmarine	The auxiliary river minesweeper was sunk on this date.
USS LST-327	United States Navy	World War II: The US Coast Guard-crewed US Navy landing ship tank was torpedoed and damaged in the English Channel by U-92 ( Kriegsmarine) with the loss of 22 of the 100 people on board. She was towed to Plymouth, Devon where she was declared a total loss. Scrapped in September 1948.
M 266	Kriegsmarine	World War II: The minesweeper was sunk at Kiel, Schleswig-Holstein in an air raid by Royal Air Force aircraft. She was later refloated and repaired.
Nanshin Maru No. 25	Japan	World War II: The coastal tanker was torpedoed and sunk in the South China Sea off Minodro, Philippines by USS Guitarro, USS Haddo and USS Ray (all United States Navy).
Nanshin Maru No. 27	Japan	World War II: The tanker was torpedoed and sunk in the South China Sea off Minodro, Philippines by USS Guitarro, USS Haddo and USS Ray (all United States Navy).
R 38	Kriegsmarine	World War II: The minesweeper struck a mine and sank in the Aegean Sea off Paros.
HMS Salamander	Royal Navy	World War II: The Halcyon-class minesweeper (815/1,330 t, 1936) was bombed and damaged in the English Channel off Cap-d'Antifer by Hawker Typhoon aircraft of the Royal Air Force. She was consequently declared a constructive total loss.
SM 144	Kriegsmarine	World War II: The Type A Marinefährprahm was scuttled in the Danube at Corabia, Romania.
Sperrbrecher 4 Oakland	Kriegsmarine	World War II: The Sperrbrecher was severely damaged at Brest by Allied aircraft. She was scuttled on 31 August. She was refloated in 1947, repaired and entered French service in 1950 as Alain L-D.
V 1269	Kriegsmarine	The KFK-2-class naval drifter/Vorpostenboot was sunk on this date.

== 28 August ==
List of shipwrecks: 28 August 1944
Ship	State	Description
AF 35	Kriegsmarine	World War II: The Type C2 Artilleriefährprahm struck a mine and sank in the Gulf of Finland (60°29′N 27°35′E) with the loss of six lives.
AF 52	Kriegsmarine	World War II: The Artilleriefährprahm was scuttled off Varna, Bulgaria.
AF 54	Kriegsmarine	World War II: The Artilleriefährprahm was scuttled off Varna, Bulgaria.
AF 55	Kriegsmarine	World War II: The Artilleriefährprahm was scuttled off Varna, Bulgaria.
AT 913	Kriegsmarine	The Type D Artilleriefährprahm was sunk on this date.
RFA Broomdale	Royal Fleet Auxiliary	The tanker (8,334 GRT, 1937) was severely damaged at Trincomalee, Ceylon, by a torpedo accidentally fired by HMS Severn (Royal Navy). One crew was killed. She was subsequently repaired and returned to service.
Cape Clear	United Kingdom	The cargo ship collided with the Liberty ship Henry Dearborn (United States) and sank in the Gulf of Suez (28°21′00″N 33°11′30″E). Her crew survived.
Derindje	Kriegsmarine	World War II: The transport ship was scuttled as a blockship at Bordeaux, Gironde, France. She was refloated in 1945, repaired and entered Finnish service in 1947.
F 211	Kriegsmarine	The Type B Marinefahrprahm was sunk on this date.
F 333	Kriegsmarine	The Type A Marinefahrprahm was sunk on this date.
F 378	Kriegsmarine	The Type AT tanker Marinefahrprahm was sunk on this date.
F 445	Kriegsmarine	The Type C2M minelayer Marinefahrprahm was sunk on this date.
F 447	Kriegsmarine	The Type C2M minelayer Marinefahrprahm was sunk on this date.
F 448	Kriegsmarine	The Type C2M minelayer Marinefahrprahm was sunk on this date. Salvaged and put in Soviet service as BDB-68 (Soviet Navy) in November 1946.
F 585	Kriegsmarine	The Type C2T Marinefahrprahm tanker was sunk on this date.
Friedrieke	Kriegsmarine	World War II: The tanker was scuttled as a blockship at Constanţa, Romania. She was subsequently refloated, repaired and entered Soviet service as Volganeft.
Illinoian	United States	World War II: The cargo ship was sunk as a breakwater for Gooseberry No. 2 off Omaha Beach, Calvados, France.
Isbjørn	Norway	The cargo ship foundered in Lyme Bay, United Kingdom (50°22′10″N 3°04′06″W) after her cargo shifted in a storm. Eight of her 23 crew were lost. Survivors were rescued by Osterhaven (Netherlands).
John Barry	United States	World War II: The Liberty ship (7,176 GRT) was torpedoed and sunk in the Indian Ocean (15°10′N 55°18′E) by U-859 (Kriegsmarine) with the loss of two of her 68 crew. Survivors were rescued by Benjamin Bourn (United States) and Sunetta (Netherlands).
M 3814 Oceaan III	Kriegsmarine	The naval drifter/auxiliary minesweeper was lost on this date.
M 3821 Volharding	Kriegsmarine	The naval drifter/auxiliary minesweeper was lost on this date.
M 3836 Gozina Hillegonda	Kriegsmarine	The naval drifter/auxiliary minesweeper was lost on this date.
M 4208 Picorre	Kriegsmarine	The naval trawler/auxiliary minesweeper was lost on this date.
M 4208 Ker-Yar-Vor	Kriegsmarine	The auxiliary minesweeper was sunk on this date.
M 4601 Elisabeth	Kriegsmarine	The naval drifter/auxiliary minesweeper was lost on this date.
M 4610 Gaulois	Kriegsmarine	The naval trawler/auxiliary minesweeper was lost on this date.
M 4614 Jean Vauquelin	Kriegsmarine	The naval trawler/auxiliary minesweeper was lost on this date.
M 6062	Kriegsmarine	World War II: The auxiliary minelayer (4,700 GRT, formerly the French cargo ship Djebel Dira and the German escort ship SG 12) was scuttled by her crew at Marseille, Bouches-du-Rhône, France.
M 6063	Kriegsmarine	World War II: The auxiliary minelayer (3,250 GRT, formerly the French passenger ship Cyrnos and the German escort ship SG 13) was scuttled by her crew at Marseille, Bouches-du-Rhône, France. She was raised after the war, repaired in 1948 and resumed service as Cyrnos.
Mica	United States	The 366-foot (112 m) Design B7-D1 concrete-hulled barge was scuttled at Guam (13°46′N 144°00′E) as part of the Glass Breakwater.
Schnelles Geleitboot 23	Kriegsmarine	World War II: The escort ship was scuttled at Marseille. The wreck was scrapped in 1946–1947.
Shapur	Germany	World War II: The tanker was scuttled in the Gironde.
SM 143	Kriegsmarine	The Type A Marinefahrprahm was sunk on this date. Salvaged and put in Soviet service as BDB-8 (Soviet Navy) in October 1944.
SM 242	Kriegsmarine	The Type A Marinefahrprahm was sunk on this date. Salvaged and put in Soviet service as BDB-9 (Soviet Navy) in October 1944.
Sperrbrecher 8 Neckar	Kriegsmarine	World War II: The Sperrbrecher, which had been severely damaged in an air raid on 26 August, was scuttled at Brest, Finistère, France. She was refloated in 1946 and scrapped.
Titti	Sweden	World War II: The coaster (209 GRT) struck a mine and sank in the Kattegat off Nidingen, Sweden with the loss of three lives. There were three survivors.
UJ-1433	Kriegsmarine	World War II: The KUJ-class submarine chaser was sunk in the English Channel off Fécamp, Seine-Inférieure, France by HMMTB 252, HMMTB 254, and HMMTB 256 (all Royal Navy).
V 222, V 223, V 224, V 225, V 226 and V 227	Kriegsmarine	World War II: The Vorpostenboote were scuttled at Brest.
V 404 Baden	Kriegsmarine	World War II: The Vorpostenboot was scuttled, either in the Gironde or at Bordeaux.
V 407 Dorum	Kriegsmarine	World War II: The Vorpostenboot was scuttled, either in the Gironde or at Bordeaux.

== 29 August ==
List of shipwrecks: 29 August 1944
Ship	State	Description
F 304	Kriegsmarine	The Type B Marinefahrprahm was sunk on this date.
F 340	Kriegsmarine	The Type A Marinefahrprahm was sunk on this date.
F 431	Kriegsmarine	The Type C Marinefahrprahm was sunk on this date.
F 469	Kriegsmarine	The Type CT tanker Marinefahrprahm was sunk on this date.
F 472	Kriegsmarine	The Type C Marinefahrprahm was sunk on this date.
F 567	Kriegsmarine	The Type C2 Marinefahrprahm was sunk on this date.
F 571	Kriegsmarine	World War II: The Type C2M minelayer Marinefahrprahm was scuttled at Swistowo.
F 572	Kriegsmarine	The Type C2M minelayer Marinefahrprahm was sunk on this date.
F 575	Kriegsmarine	World War II: The Type C2 Marinefahrprahm was scuttled at Swistowo. Salvaged and put in Soviet service.
F 582	Kriegsmarine	The Type C2T tanker Marinefahrprahm was sunk on this date.
F 591	Kriegsmarine	World War II: The Type C2A Marinefährprahm was scuttled in the Danube at Turnu Măgurele, Romania.
F 849	Kriegsmarine	The Type D Marinefahrprahm was sunk on this date.
F 894	Kriegsmarine	World War II: The Type D Marinefahrprahm was sunk on this date. Salvaged and put in Soviet service as BDB-8 (Soviet Navy) in June 1945.
F 896	Kriegsmarine	The Type D Marinefahrprahm was sunk on this date.
M 3800 Stoomloodsvaartuig 16	Kriegsmarine	World War II: The minesweeper was sunk in the English Channel off Berck-sur-Mer, Pas-de-Calais, France by Allied aircraft.
M 4215 Marie-Elisa	Kriegsmarine	The naval drifter/auxiliary minesweeper was lost on this date.
MAL 4	Kriegsmarine	World War II: The MAL 1 type landing fire support lighter was scuttled off Varna, Bulgaria.
Mexico Maru	Imperial Japanese Army	World War II: Convoy H-33: The Tacoma Maru-class transport (6,064 GRT was torpedoed and sunk in the Celebes Sea (02°50′N 123°29′E) north of Celebes by USS Jack (United States Navy). A gunner, 825 troops and 21 crewmen were killed. 1,609 survivors were rescued by PB-105, 760 by CH-31, and 935 by CH-46 (all Imperial Japanese Navy).
Najade	Kriegsmarine	The Type C Marinefahrprahm was sunk on this date.
S 47	Kriegsmarine	World War II: The damaged Type 1939/40 motor torpedo boat was scuttled at Constanța, Romania.
S-51	Kriegsmarine	World War II: The damaged Type 1939/40 motor torpedo boat was scuttled at Constanța.
SM 203	Kriegsmarine	The KFK-2-class naval drifter was sunk on this date.
SM 204	Kriegsmarine	The KFK-2-class naval drifter was sunk on this date.
SM 205	Kriegsmarine	The KFK-2-class naval drifter was sunk on this date.
SM 207	Kriegsmarine	The KFK-2-class naval drifter was sunk on this date.
SM 208	Kriegsmarine	The KFK-2-class naval drifter was sunk on this date.
SM 209	Kriegsmarine	The KFK-2-class naval drifter was sunk on this date.
SM 210	Kriegsmarine	The KFK-2-class naval drifter was sunk on this date.
SM 211	Kriegsmarine	The KFK-2-class naval drifter minesweeper was lost on this date.
SM 222	Kriegsmarine	World War II: The RA 51-class minesweeper was scuttled by her crew.
SM 223	Kriegsmarine	World War II: The RA 51-class minesweeper was scuttled by her crew.
Sperrbrecher 176 Valeria	Kriegsmarine	World War II: The Sperrbrecher was sunk by Allied aircraft off Elbe 1 Beacon.
PC-47 Sv.Nikola-I	Yugoslav Partisans	World War II: The small patrol boat was sunk by mortar fire from shore. Her political commissar was killed and three crew were wounded.
UJ 118	Kriegsmarine	The submarine chaser, a converted Type A Marinefahrprahm, was sunk on this date.
W-28	Imperial Japanese Navy	World War II: Convoy H-33: The W-19-class minesweeper (650 GRT was torpedoed and sunk in the Celebes Sea (02°50′N 123°29′E) north of the Celebes by USS Jack (United States Navy). There were only 3 survivors on a crew of about one hundred men.

== 30 August ==
List of shipwrecks: 30 August 1944
Ship	State	Description
Alexandra	Germany	World War II: The coaster (592 GRT) was sunk at Stettin, Pomerania in an air raid by the Royal Air Force Bomber Command.
De Grasse	Vichy France	World War II: The barracks ship was scuttled at Blaye, Gironde. Refloated in August 1945, repaired and re-entered service in July 1947.
F 570, F 572 and F 582	Kriegsmarine	World War II: The Marinefährprahme were scuttled at Varna.
F 1076	Kriegsmarine	The incomplete Type D Marinefahrprahm was sunk at Gollnow-Werk, Stettin.
F 1077	Kriegsmarine	The incomplete Type D Marinefahrprahm was sunk at Gollnow-Werk, Stettin.
F 1078	Kriegsmarine	The incomplete Type D Marinefahrprahm was sunk at Gollnow-Werk, Stettin.
Finnland	Germany	World War II: The cargo ship was bombed and damaged by aircraft off Stettin. The ship sank in tow at Liepāja, Latvia, on 18 October 1944.
Jacksonville	United States	World War II: Convoy CU 36: The tanker was torpedoed and split in two, with the bow sinking in the Atlantic Ocean 50 nautical miles (93 km) north of Londonderry (55°30′N 7°30′W) by U-482 (Kriegsmarine) with the loss of 30 gunners and 48 crewmen. The only two survivors, a gunner and a crewman, were rescued by USS Poole (United States Navy). Escorts scuttled the stern section.
KFK 512	Kriegsmarine	World War II: The naval trawler struck a mine and sank in the Stettin Lagoon.
M 3853 La Lorientaise	Kriegsmarine	The naval trawler/auxiliary minesweeper was scuttled at Dieppe, France. She was raised after the war by the French and resumed service as a trawler.
M 4032 Sardella	Kriegsmarine	World War II: The auxiliary minesweeper was scuttled near Brest, France.
MAL 18	Kriegsmarine	World War II: The MAL 1A type landing fire support lighter was sunk by Soviet bombers in port at Rannapungerja, Lake Peipus. One crew was wounded.
MAL 23	Kriegsmarine	World War II: The MAL 1A type landing fire support lighter was ssunk by Soviet bombers in port at Mustvee, Lake Peipus.
MAL 24	Kriegsmarine	World War II: The MAL 1A type landing fire support lighter was sunk by Soviet bombers in port at Rannapungerja, Lake Peipus. One crew was killed and two were wounded.
R-35	Kriegsmarine	World War II: The Type R-25 minesweeper was scuttled at Varna.
R 37	Kriegsmarine	World War II: The Type R-25 minesweeper was scuttled at Varna, Bulgaria.
R 163	Kriegsmarine	World War II: The Type R-151 minesweeper was scuttled at Varna, Bulgaria. R 163 was raised, repaired, and put in Soviet service as BO-54.
R-164, R-165, R 166, R-197, R-196, R 203, R 205,R 206, R 207, R-209, R-216 and R 248	Kriegsmarine	World War II: The Type R-151 minesweepers were scuttled at Varna, Bulgaria.
R 206	Kriegsmarine	World War II: The Type R-151 minesweeper was scuttled at Varna, Bulgaria. R 206 was raised, repaired, and put in Soviet service as BO-53.
R 193	Kriegsmarine	World War II: The Type R-151 minesweeper was sunk at Stettin in an air raid by Royal Canadian Air Force aircraft.
R 248	Kriegsmarine	World War II: The Type R-218 minesweeper was scuttled at Varna, Bulgaria.
S 45, S 47 and S 51	Kriegsmarine	World War II: The motor torpedo boats were scuttled at Varna.
Sperrbrecher 3 Belgrad	Kriegsmarine	World War II: The Sperrbrecher was scuttled, either in the Gironde or at Bordeaux.
Sperrbrecher 26 Mostrand	Kriegsmarine	World War II: The Sperrbrecher (3,549 GRT) was sunk by Allied aircraft at the mouth of the Elbe (54°01′N 8°12′E) with the loss of four lives.
St Louis	Kriegsmarine	World War II: The depot ship was bombed, set afire and severely damaged at Kiel in an Allied air raid. She was beached. Repaired post-war and put in service as a hospital ship.
UJ 2301 and UJ 2305	Kriegsmarine	World War II: The submarine chasers were scuttled at Varna.
Vs 615	Kriegsmarine	The KFK-2-class naval drifter/Vorpostenboot was sunk on this date.

== 31 August ==
List of shipwrecks: 31 August 1944
Ship	State	Description
Chiyoda Maru	Japan	World War II: Convoy MI-15: The tanker (4,700 GRT) was torpedoed and sunk in the Luzon Strait (20°55′S 121°17′E) by USS Queenfish (United States Navy). 328 passengers and 15 crewmen were killed.
F 471	Kriegsmarine	World War II: The Type C Marinefahrprahm was sunk by Rumanian artillery on the Danube near Calafat, Rumania. She was salvaged and put in Soviet service as BDB-21 (Soviet Navy) in October 1944.
Fengyang Maru	Japan	World War II: The cargo ship (3,977 GRT) was bombed and sunk in the Yangtze by aircraft of the United States Fourteenth Air Force.
Hinode Maru No. 20	Imperial Japanese Navy	World War II: The auxiliary minesweeper (281 GRT) was torpedoed and sunk in the Bashi Channel by USS Barb (United States Navy) with the loss of two crewmen.
Kabuchi Maru	Japan	World War II: The cargo ship was bombed and sunk in the Pacific Ocean off Ceram Island, Netherlands East Indies by Consolidated PBY Catalina aircraft of the United States Army Air Force.
Kairyu Maru No. 2	Japan	World War II: The cargo ship was bombed and sunk in the Pacific Ocean off Ceram Island by Consolidated PBY Catalina aircraft of the United States Army Air Force.
M 4452 Mulsum	Kriegsmarine	The auxiliary minesweeper was sunk on this date.
M 4454 Wesermunde	Kriegsmarine	The auxiliary minesweeper was sunk on this date.
Okuni Maru	Imperial Japanese Army	World War II: Convoy MI-15: The transport (5,633 GRT) was torpedoed and sunk in the Bashi Channel (20°55′S 121°17′E) by USS Barb (United States Navy) with the loss of three crewmen.
Perros Guirec	Germany	World War II: The cargo ship was scuttled at Rouen, Seine-Inférieure, France. The wreck was dispersed post June 1945.
Sanko Maru No. 8	Japan	World War II: The cargo ship was bombed and sunk in the Banda Sea north of Alor Island, Netherlands East Indies by North American B-25 Mitchell aircraft of the Royal Netherlands Air Force.
Shirataka	Imperial Japanese Navy	World War II: Convoy MI-15: The minelayer was torpedoed and sunk in the Bashi Channel (21°05′N 121°26′E) by USS Sealion (United States Navy). Casualties are unknown but her captain was killed.
Suruga Maru	Japan	World War II: The cargo ship (525 GRT) was bombed and sunk off Iwo Jima (24°46′N 141°19′E) by F6F aircraft of the United States Navy. Four crew were killed.
Tokuhei Maru	Japan	World War II: The cargo ship (3,439 GRT) was bombed and sunk in the Yangtze by aircraft of the United States Fourteenth Air Force. 18 crew were killed.
Toshi Maru No. 8	Imperial Japanese Navy	World War II: The auxiliary minesweeper (281 GRT) as bombed and sunk off Iwo Jima (25°00′N 141°50′E) by F6F aircraft of the United States Navy.
U-1000	Kriegsmarine	World War II: The Type VIIC/41 submarine struck a mine and was damaged in the Baltic Sea off Pillau, East Prussia. She was consequently taken out of service and scrapped.

== Unknown date ==
List of shipwrecks: Unknown date 1944
Ship	State	Description
CB-3	National Republican Navy	World War II: The CB-class midget submarine was scuttled at/off Constanța between 25 and 30 August.
Chateau Larose	France	World War II: The cargo ship was scuttled at Marseille, Bouches-du-Rhône. Refloated in December 1946, repaired and returned to service.
Condorcet	Kriegsmarine	World War II: The barracks ship was scuttled at Toulon, Var, France.
F 559	Kriegsmarine	The Type C2 Marinefahrprahm was sunk sometime in August.
F 562	Kriegsmarine	The Type C2 Marinefahrprahm was sunk sometime in August.
FB 01 Ebro	Kriegsmarine	The naval trawler was lost sometime in August.
FB 20 Pelikan	Kriegsmarine	The anti-aircraft vessel was scuttled sometime in August.
Ferrara	Italy	World War II: The cargo ship was sunk in an air raid at Genoa. She was refloated in 1947, repaired and returned to service.
G 3183	Kriegsmarine	World War II: The RA 51-class minesweeper was sunk by a mine in the Irben Strait sometime in August (location seems unlikely).
Göttingen	Kriegsmarine	World War II: The incomplete hospital ship was scuttled at Marseille, Bouches-du-Rhône, France.
H 42 Cordoba	Kriegsmarine	World War II: The transport ship was scuttled as a blockship at Le Havre, Seine-Inférieure, France. She was refloated post-war and scrapped.
Havre Maru	Japan	After suffering a bent propeller shaft she was towed to Jolo on 24 August. After the next "few weeks" of repair she was driven aground by a heavy rain storm on a sand bar 2,000 metres (6,600 ft) north east of Jolo town at 06°03′N 120°59′E. The ship was not refloated.
Konistra	Germany	World War II: The cargo ship was scuttled in Marseille. Later raised and scrapped in Fos-sur-Mer, Bouches-du-Rhône, from July 1946.
HMS LCP(L) 84, HMS LCP(L) 85, HMS LCP(L) 88, HMS LCP(L) 97, HMS LCP(L) 98, HMS LCP(L) 110, HMS LCP(L) 118, HMS LCP(L) 128, HMS LCP(L) 137, HMS LCP(L) 145, HMS LCP(L) 146, HMS LCP(L) 149, HMS LCP(L) 162, HMS LCP(L) 163, HMS LCP(L) 198, HMS LCP(L) 200, HMS LCP(L) 230, HMS LCP(L) 231, HMS LCP(L) 232, HMS LCP(L) 233, HMS LCP(L) 235, HMS LCP(L) 238, HMS LCP(L) 239, HMS LCP(L) 241, HMS LCP(L) 242, HMS LCP(L) 246, HMS LCP(L) 247, HMS LCP(L) 269, HMS LCP(L) 293, HMS LCP(L) 294	Royal Navy	The landing craft personnel (large) were lost sometime in August or September.
M-262	Kriegsmarine	World War II: The Type 1940 minesweeper was scuttled at Bordeaux, Gironde, France on 15 or 25 August.
M 4013 Broesen	Kriegsmarine	The naval drifter/auxiliary minesweeper was lost sometime in August.
M 4441 St. Pierre	Kriegsmarine	The naval trawler/auxiliary minesweeper was lost sometime in August.
M 4450 Otto Flohr	Kriegsmarine	The auxiliary minesweeper was lost sometime in August.
M 6021 Courlis	Kriegsmarine	The naval trawler/auxiliary minesweeper was lost sometime in August.
M 6023	Kriegsmarine	World War II: The naval trawler/auxiliary minesweeper, a former Von der Goltz-class Vorpostenboot, was scuttled at La Ciotat sometime in August.
Marechal Petain	France	World War II: The passenger ship was torpedoed and sunk at Port-du-Bouc, Bouches-du-Rhône by a Kriegsmarine vessel. Refloated post-war, repaired and returned to service at La Marseillaise.
Massilia	Germany	World War II: The ocean liner was scuttled as a blockship at Marseille. She was refloated post-war and scrapped.
Norjerv	Norway	World War II: The Design 1080 ship was sunk as a blockship on the coast of Normandy. She was refloated in 1949.
PA-4	Kriegsmarine	World War II: The PA-class patrol ship was scuttled incomplete at Nantes, Loire-Inférieure, France sometime in August.
Paul et Jeannine	Kriegsmarine	The naval trawler/auxiliary minesweeper was lost sometime in August.
RA 55	Kriegsmarine	World War II: The RA 51-class minesweeper was sunk by a mine in the Irben Strait sometime in August (location seems unlikely).
San Pedro	Vichy France	World War II: The cargo ship was scuttled at Marseille. She was refloated post-war and returned to service in 1948.
Senneville	Germany	World War II: The cargo ship was scuttled at Marseille. She was salvaged in 1947–48 and partly scrapped in situ. Final scrapping took place at Savona, Italy.
SG 24	Kriegsmarine	World War II: The incomplete auxiliary fast escort was scuttled at Marseille sometime in August.
SG 44	Kriegsmarine	World War II: The incomplete auxiliary fast escort was scuttled at Marseille sometime in August.
Tempo 4	Germany	World War II: The tanker was scuttled at Marseille. She was later refloated and scrapped.
U-925	Kriegsmarine	World War II: The Type VIIC submarine was lost on patrol in the Arctic Ocean or Norwegian Sea with the loss of all 51 crew. Cause unknown.
UJ 101	Kriegsmarine	World War II: The submarine chaser was scuttled in the Black Sea off Kaliakra, Bulgaria between 26 and 30 August.
UJ 103	Kriegsmarine	World War II: The submarine chaser was scuttled in the Black Sea off Kaliakra between 26 and 30 August.
UJ 107	Kriegsmarine	World War II: The submarine chaser was scuttled in the Black Sea off Kaliakra between 26 and 30 August.
UJ 116 Xanten	Kriegsmarine	World War II: The submarine chaser was scuttled in the Black Sea off Kaliakra between 26 and 30 August.
UJ 118	Kriegsmarine	World War II: The submarine chaser was scuttled in the Black Sea off Kaliakra between 26 and 30 August.
UJ 2223	Kriegsmarine	World War II: The Gabbiano-class corvette was bombed and sunk at Genoa, Italy, by American aircraft on 16 August 1944, or sunk by USS PT-202, USS PT-213, and USS PT-218 (all United States Navy) on 24 May 1944.
