= Operation Scavenger =

Bombing of Iwo Jima and the Bonin Islands, August 1944

Coordinates: 27°40′N 141°48′E

During World War II, Operation Scavenger was the aerial bombardment of Iwo Jima and the Bonin Islands on 4–5 August 1944, as part of the preparation for the invasion and other fighting around the Marianas Islands.

Carrier aircraft wipe out Convoy 4804, marus ENJU, HOKKAI, KYUSHU, SHOGEN, and UNKAI No.7 are sunk north west of Chichi Jima, as well as IJN LST T-133 off Okinawa.

== Sources ==
- Carter, Worrall Reed. Beans, Bullets, and Black Oil - The Story Of Fleet Logistics Afloat In The Pacific During World War, Washington DC : Department of the Navy, 1953, p. 168.
