= USS LST-920 =

1944 LST-542-class tank landing ship

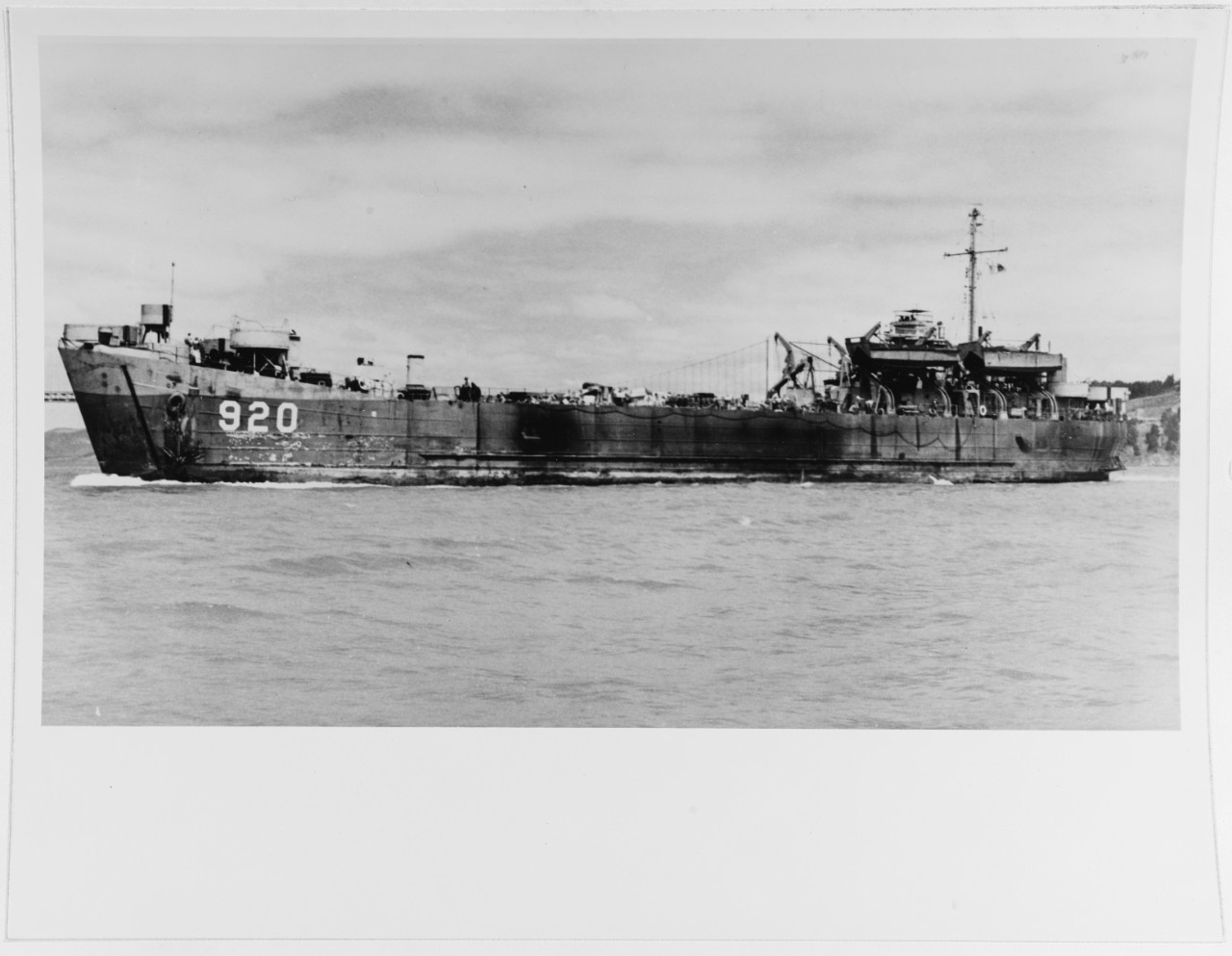
- USS LST-920 photographed c. 1945-1946.

History

United States
- Name: LST-920
- Builder: Bethlehem-Hingham Shipyard, Hingham, Massachusetts
- Yard number: 3390
- Laid down: 26 April 1944
- Launched: 29 May 1944
- Commissioned: 17 June 1944
- Decommissioned: 8 July 1946
- Stricken: 14 March 1947
- Identification: Hull symbol: LST-920; Code letters: NKAA
- Honors and awards: 1 × battle star
- Fate: Sold for commercial operations, 17 June 1948

United States
- Name: Stanolind 55
- Owner: Standard Oil of Indiana
- Acquired: 17 June 1948
- Fate: Sold, 1951

Brazil
- Name: Guarap
- Owner: Empreza Internacional de Transportes; Companhia Paulista de Commercio Maritimo
- Acquired: 1951
- Refit: modified for cargo handling
- Fate: Sold for scrapping, 23 June 1972

General characteristics
- Class & type: LST-542-class tank landing ship
- Displacement: 1,625 long tons (1,651 t) (light); 4,080 long tons (4,145 t) (full (seagoing draft with 1,675 short tons (1,520 t) load); 2,366 long tons (2,404 t) (beaching)
- Length: 328 ft (100 m) oa
- Beam: 50 ft (15 m)
- Draft: Unloaded: 2 ft 4 in (0.71 m) forward; 7 ft 6 in (2.29 m) aft; Full load: 8 ft 3 in (2.51 m) forward; 14 ft 1 in (4.29 m) aft; Landing with 500 short tons (450 t) load: 3 ft 11 in (1.19 m) forward; 9 ft 10 in (3.00 m) aft; Limiting 11 ft 2 in (3.40 m); Maximum navigation 14 ft 1 in (4.29 m)
- Installed power: 2 × 900 hp (670 kW) Electro-Motive Diesel 12-567A diesel engines; 1,800 shp (1,300 kW)
- Propulsion: 1 × Falk main reduction gears; 2 × Propellers
- Speed: 11.6 kn (21.5 km/h; 13.3 mph)
- Range: 24,000 nmi (44,000 km; 28,000 mi) at 9 kn (17 km/h; 10 mph) while displacing 3,960 long tons (4,024 t)
- Boats & landing craft carried: 2 x LCVPs
- Capacity: 1,600–1,900 short tons (3,200,000–3,800,000 lb; 1,500,000–1,700,000 kg) cargo depending on mission
- Troops: 16 officers, 147 enlisted men
- Complement: 13 officers, 104 enlisted men
- Armament: Varied, ultimate armament; 2 × twin 40 mm (1.57 in) Bofors guns; 4 × single 40 mm Bofors guns; 12 × 20 mm (0.79 in) Oerlikon cannons

Service record
- Part of: LST Flotilla 36
- Operations: Assault and occupation of Okinawa Gunto (7 June 1945)
- Awards: Combat Action Ribbon; China Service Medal; American Campaign Medal; European–African–Middle Eastern Campaign Medal; Asiatic–Pacific Campaign Medal; World War II Victory Medal; Navy Occupation Service Medal w/Asia Clasp

USS LST-920 was an LST-542-class tank landing ship in the United States Navy. Like many of her class, she was not named and is properly referred to by her hull designation.

== Construction ==
LST-920 was laid down on 26 April 1944, at Hingham, Massachusetts, by the Bethlehem-Hingham Shipyard; launched on 29 May 1944; and commissioned on 17 June 1944.

== Service history ==
During World War II, LST-920 was first assigned to the European Theatre, sailing in convoy HXM 30. She was later reassigned to the Asiatic-Pacific theater and took part in the assault and occupation of Okinawa Gunto in June 1945.

Following the war, she performed occupation duty and saw service in China until early March 1946. Upon her return to the United States, she was decommissioned on 8 July 1946, and struck from the Navy list on 14 March 1947. On 17 June 1948, the ship was sold to Standard Oil of Indiana, for commercial operation, she was renamed Stanolind 55. In 1951, she was sold to Empreza Internacional de Transportes of Brazil.

== Brazilian service ==
In Brazilian service, LST-920 was renamed Guarape. She was modified at Higgins, in New Orleans, Louisiana, for cargo handling. Four hatches were added to the main deck and four derricks. She was later sold to Companhia Paulista de Commercio Maritimo, of Santos, Brazil, where she retained her name. She was finally scrapped 23 June 1972.

== Awards ==
LST-920 earned one battle stars for World War II service.

== Bibliography ==
Online resources

- "LST-920". Dictionary of American Naval Fighting Ships. Naval History and Heritage Command. This article incorporates text from this source, which is in the public domain.
- "Bethlehem-Hingham, Hingham MA". www.ShipbuildingHistory.com. 11 August 2011.
- "USS LST-920". NavSource. 28 April 2017.
