= August 1944 =

Month of 1944

<<	August 1944					>>
Su	Mo	Tu	We	Th	Fr	Sa
		1	2	3	4	5
6	7	8	9	10	11	12
13	14	15	16	17	18	19
20	21	22	23	24	25	26
27	28	29	30	31

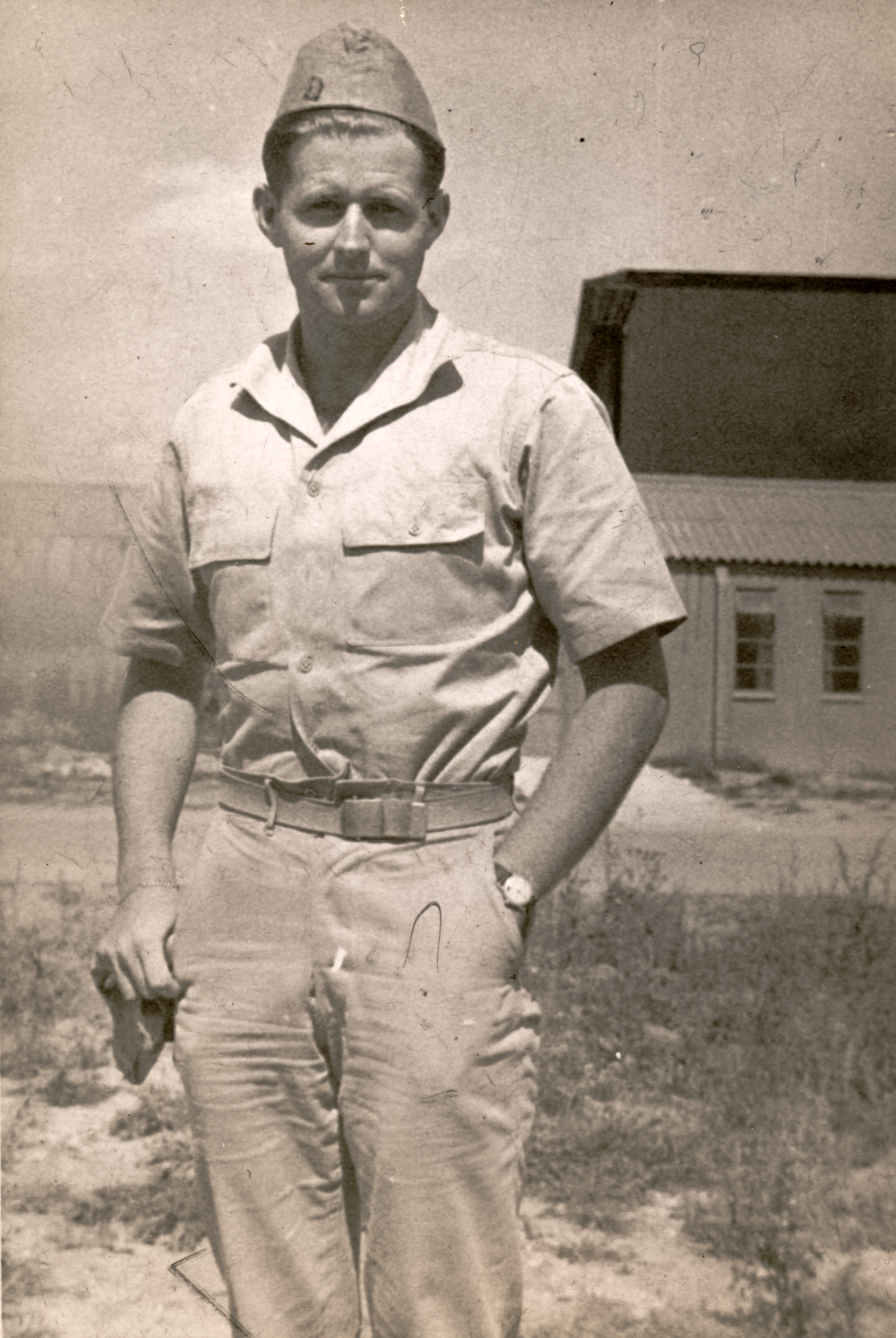
August 12, 1944: Last known photograph of Joseph P. Kennedy Jr. prior to death in plane explosion

The following events occurred in August 1944:

== August 1, 1944 (Tuesday) ==
- The Polish resistance Home Army began the Warsaw Uprising against Nazi occupation forces.
- The Battle of Tinian ended in American victory.
- The Philadelphia transit strike began.
- Sergio Osmeña became 4th President of the Philippines.
- Scientists in the United Kingdom said that DDT had been found to act as an anti-malarial insecticide.
- The biographical film Wilson starring Alexander Knox as the 28th President of the United States Woodrow Wilson was released.
- Anne Frank makes her last diary entry.
- Born: Yury Romanenko, cosmonaut, in Orenburg Oblast, USSR
- Died: Manuel L. Quezon, 65, President of the Commonwealth of the Philippines from 1935 until his death

== August 2, 1944 (Wednesday) ==
- The Germans launched 316 V-1 flying bombs at London, the highest single-day total yet. Over 100 reached the capital, hitting Tower Bridge and doing great damage to the armament factories on the outskirts.
- The primary stage of the Lublin–Brest Offensive concluded with Soviet objectives met.
- Turkey broke off diplomatic relations with Nazi Germany.
- The American destroyer escort Fiske was torpedoed and sunk in the Atlantic Ocean by German submarine U-804.
- SS murderers in Auschwitz-Birkenau slaughtered the last residents (just under 3,000) of the so-called Gypsy family camp.
- Born: Jim Capaldi, drummer, singer, songwriter and co-founder of the rock band Traffic, in Evesham, England (d. 2005)
- Died: Kakuji Kakuta, 53, Japanese admiral (probable suicide on Tinian)

== August 3, 1944 (Thursday) ==
- The Siege of Myitkyina in Burma ended in Allied victory.
- The British destroyer Quorn was sunk off Normandy during a heavy attack by German ships and aircraft.
- The Soviet Union and Lebanon established diplomatic relations with each other.
- The Education Act 1944 received Royal Assent in the United Kingdom.

== August 4, 1944 (Friday) ==
- German forces retreated from Florence after blowing up the city's medieval bridges overnight to effectively cut the city in two. Only the Ponte Vecchio was spared.
- Carl Gustaf Emil Mannerheim became 6th President of Finland after Risto Ryti resigned.
- German submarine U-671 was sunk by British warships in the English Channel.
- The Japanese destroyer Matsu was shelled and sunk northwest of Chichijima by American warships.
- In Amsterdam, Anne Frank, her family and the others hiding in the Secret Annex at Prisengracht 263 were discovered and arrested.
- Born:
  - Jonas Falk, actor, in Örgryte, Sweden (d. 2010)
  - Richard Belzer, stand-up comedian and actor, in Bridgeport, Connecticut (d. 2023)
  - William Frankfather, actor, in Kermit, Texas (d. 1998)
  - Orhan Gencebay, musician, in Samsun, Turkey
- Died: Krzysztof Kamil Baczyński, 23, Polish poet and Home Army soldier (killed in action)

== August 5, 1944 (Saturday) ==
- The Cowra breakout occurred when over 1,100 Japanese prisoners of war attempted to escape from a POW camp near Cowra in New South Wales, Australia. Four Australian soldiers and 231 Japanese were killed, but hundreds managed to escape although they would all be recaptured within ten days.
- The four-day Wola massacre began when German troops and collaborationist forces started systematically killing between 40,000 and 50,000 people in the Wola district of Warsaw during the Uprising.
- More than 300 Jewish refugees perished when the Turkish motor schooner Mefküre was sunk in the Black Sea by shellfire from the Soviet submarine Shch-215.
- "Swinging on a Star" by Bing Crosby went to #1 on the Billboard singles charts.

== August 6, 1944 (Sunday) ==
- The Soviets began the Osovets Offensive as part of the final phase of Operation Bagration.
- German submarines U-471, U-952 and U-969 were sunk at Toulon during an American air raid.
- German submarine U-736 was sunk in the Bay of Biscay by depth charges from the frigate HMS Loch Killin.
- The Philadelphia transit strike was broken as a result of U.S. military intervention under the Smith–Connally Act.

== August 7, 1944 (Monday) ==
- Operation Bluecoat ended in Allied victory.
- The Battle for Brest began in Brittany, France.
- The Japanese cruiser Nagara was torpedoed and sunk off the Amakusa Islands by the American submarine Croaker.
- Born:
  - John Glover, actor, in Salisbury, Maryland
  - Robert Mueller, American civil servant and sixth Director of the Federal Bureau of Investigation (d. 2026)

== August 8, 1944 (Tuesday) ==
- The Defense of Hengyang ended in the Second Sino-Japanese War with the Japanese capture of Hengyang.
- The Damasta sabotage occurred near the Cretan village of Damasta. Greek resistance fighters led by British Special Operations Executive Officer W. Stanley Moss attacked Axis occupation forces and killed 35 Germans and 10 Italians.
- The British and American governments signed the Anglo-American Petroleum Agreement in Washington.
- The Japanese converted troopship Kotobuki Maru (formerly the Italian ocean liner Conte Verde) was sunk in Shanghai by an American B-24 of the 373rd Bomb Squadron.
- The Canadian corvette HMCS Regina was torpedoed and sunk north of Trevose Head by German submarine U-667.
- The Junkers Ju 287 made its first flight.
- Born: Brooke Bundy, actress, in New York City
- Died: Michael Wittmann, 30, German Waffen-SS tank commander (killed in action in Normandy)

== August 9, 1944 (Wednesday) ==
- The Vyborg–Petrozavodsk Offensive ended with a ceasefire.
- The Battle of Studzianki began in Poland.
- Douglas MacArthur received a letter from President Roosevelt noting that he supported the plan that MacArthur recommended to make the Philippines the next priority in the Pacific.
- SS and police units began liquidating the Łódź Ghetto. From this day through August 28 more than 60,000 Jews and an undetermined number of Roma were deported to Auschwitz-Birkenau.
- The first poster depicting Smokey Bear, a mascot created to educate the American public about the dangers of forest fires, was released.
- In the Ordinance of 9 August 1944, the French Provisional Government restored the Republic and the rule of law in metropolitan France and nullified the laws of the Vichy regime.
- The Preston Sturges-directed satirical comedy-drama film Hail the Conquering Hero starring Eddie Bracken, Ella Raines and William Demarest was released.
- Born: Sam Elliott, actor, in Sacramento, California

== August 10, 1944 (Thursday) ==
- The Battle of Narva ended in a German defensive victory on the Eastern Front.
- The Battle of Tannenberg Line ended in tactical German victory.
- The Battle of Guam ended in American victory.
- The Soviets began the Tartu Offensive.
- German submarine U-608 was scuttled after being attacked and damaged in the Bay of Biscay by a B24 of No. 53 Squadron RAF and by the British sloop Wren.
- Died: Berthold Schenk Graf von Stauffenberg, 39, German aristocrat, lawyer and conspirator in the 20 July plot (executed by the Nazis)

== August 11, 1944 (Friday) ==
- The Soviet 3rd Baltic Front captured Pechory.
- German submarine U-385 was depth charged and sunk in the Bay of Biscay by a Short Sunderland of No. 461 Squadron RAAF and by the British sloop Starling.
- German submarine U-967 was scuttled at Toulon.
- The German steamship Giuseppe Dormio, sailing from Pola to Rijeka, struck a mine in the Vela vrata strait northeast of Cape Mašnjak and approximately two hundred meters south of the Brestova–Porozina ferry route around 03:30 local time and sank; six people were killed.
- Born: Ian McDiarmid, actor and director, in Carnoustie, Scotland; Frederick W. Smith, founder and CEO of FedEx, in Marks, Mississippi
- Died: Hideyoshi Obata, 54, Japanese general (committed seppuku during the Battle of Guam)

== August 12, 1944 (Saturday) ==
- The Battle of the Falaise Pocket began.
- Italian campaign (World War II): The Allies captured Florence.
- Sant'Anna di Stazzema massacre: The Waffen-SS and Black Brigades paramilitaries murdered about 560 civilians and refugees (including more than 100 children) in the Italian village of Sant'Anna di Stazzema, burned their bodies, and left their houses semi-derelict.
- The Wola massacre around Warsaw ended.
- A Special Air Service mission codenamed Operation Loyton began in the Vosges department of France. In the opening phase, a small advance party parachuted into the Vosges Mountains with the objective of contacting the local French Resistance and conducting a reconnaissance of the area.
- Operation Pluto: The world's first undersea oil pipeline was laid between England and France.
- German submarine U-198 was sunk in the Indian Ocean near the Seychelles by depth charges from Allied warships.
- Died: Joseph P. Kennedy Jr., 29, U.S. Navy lieutenant and eldest son of Joseph P. Kennedy Sr. (killed over Blythburgh, England when his PB4Y-1 Liberator's explosive detonated prematurely); Suzanne Spaak, 39, Belgian member of the French Resistance (executed by the Gestapo)

== August 13, 1944 (Sunday) ==
- In the Tartu Offensive, the Soviet 3rd Baltic Front captured Võru and Valga.
- The Battle of Ilomantsi ended in Finnish victory.
- The American submarine Flier struck a mine and sank in the Balabac Strait.
- German submarine U-270 was depth charged and sunk in the Bay of Biscay by a Short Sunderland of No. 461 Squadron RAAF.
- Born: Kevin Tighe, actor, in Los Angeles, California

== August 14, 1944 (Monday) ==
- The Osovets Offensive officially ended with the completion of Soviet objectives.
- Canadian and Polish troops began Operation Tractable, the final offensive of the Battle of Normandy.
- The Fort Lawton Riot began at Fort Lawton in Seattle. An Italian prisoner of war was killed during a violent conflict between American soldiers and Italian POWs.
- German submarine U-618 was sunk in the Bay of Biscay by British ships and aircraft.

== August 15, 1944 (Tuesday) ==
- Allied forces began Operation Dragoon, the invasion of southern France.
- German submarine U-741 was depth charged and sunk off Le Havre by the American destroyer Somers.
- Born: Gianfranco Ferré, fashion designer, in Legnano, Italy (d. 2007); Sylvie Vartan, singer and actress, in Iskrets, Kingdom of Bulgaria

== August 16, 1944 (Wednesday) ==
- The Battle of Studzianki ended in Soviet-Polish victory.
- The Battle of Guilin–Liuzhou began in the Second Sino-Japanese War.
- American forces entered Chartres.
- Walter Model replaced Günther von Kluge as Oberbefehlshaber West.
- German forces launched Operation Doppelkopf, a counter-offensive on the Eastern Front.
- The Roosevelt Administration froze Argentina's gold assets in the U.S. as a consequence of the Argentinian government's failure to fully cooperate in the war against the Axis powers.

== August 17, 1944 (Thursday) ==
- In the Pacific, the Battle of Biak ended in Allied victory.
- During the Battle of the Falaise Pocket, the First Canadian Army captured the ruined town of Falaise itself.
- VIII Corps of the Third United States Army took Saint-Malo when the German-held fortress there surrendered after enduring two weeks of bombing and shelling.
- Two Soviet infantry battalions under Georgy Gubkin and Pavel Yurgin reached part of the River Scheshule. Some of them were sent to raise the Red Flag on the other bank, with Sergeant Alexander Belov doing the actual raising; the Soviets had now crossed into East Prussia and thus Germany proper.

== August 18, 1944 (Friday) ==
- The German 7th Army retreated across the Orne, leaving 18,000 men behind to be captured.
- The Allies closed the Falaise Gap, trapping German forces to the north and west.
- The Red Cross entered Drancy internment camp one day after its abandonment by German forces. 500 survivors were liberated.
- The French battleship Strasbourg and cruiser La Galissonnière were sunk at Toulon in an American air raid.
- German submarines U-107 and U-621 were both sunk in the Bay of Biscay by Allied ships and aircraft. U-129 was scuttled at Lorient that same day.
- A "wolfpack" of American submarines attacked Japanese convoy Hi-71 in the South China Sea. The Japanese aircraft carrier Taiyō was torpedoed and sunk by the submarines Rasher and Redfish.
- The Japanese cruiser Natori was torpedoed and sunk in the Philippine Sea east of Samar by the American submarine Hardhead.
- Born: Bob Glidden, American Pro Stock drag racer (d. 2017); Robert Hitchcock, sculptor, in Perth, Australia
- Died: Ernst Thälmann, 58, leader of the Communist Party of Germany (executed at Buchenwald concentration camp)

== August 19, 1944 (Saturday) ==
- The Battle for Paris began. Resistance fighters in the capital became confident enough to begin making sniper attacks on nervous German troops.
- Operation Bagration ended in a Soviet victory.
- The battle for Hill 262 began during the final stages of the Normandy Campaign.
- The American "wolfpack" submarine attack on Japanese convoy Hi-71 in the South China Sea continued for a second day. Troopship Teia Maru (formerly the French ocean liner Aramis) was torpedoed and sunk by Rasher and Redfish, the landing craft depot ship Tamatsu Maru was sunk by Spadefish with the loss of some 4,890 lives, and fleet oiler Hayasui was torpedoed and sunk by Bluefish.
- German submarines U-123 and U-466 were scuttled at Lorient and Toulon, respectively.
- A referendum was held in Australia asking whether the public approved of an alteration to the Constitution granting the federal government additional power to legislate on a wide variety of matters for a period of five years. 54% voted against the proposal.
- Private Nikolay Alekseevich Ignatiev (Russian: "Игнатьев Николай Алексеевич") was awarded the medal "For Courage" (За отвагу/Za Otvagu) for his actions on the last day of Operation Bagration
- Born: Bodil Malmsten, poet and novelist, in Bjärme, Sweden (d. 2016)
- Died: Günther von Kluge, 61, German field marshal (suicide); Henry Wood, 75, English conductor

== August 20, 1944 (Sunday) ==
- Soviet forces in Romania began the Jassy–Kishinev Offensive.
- Philippe Pétain was arrested by the Germans and taken to Belfort because he refused to leave Vichy.
- The Battle of Toulon began.
- German submarine U-188 was scuttled in Bordeaux to prevent capture by the Allies, one of five U-boats lost that day. U-9 was sunk at Constanța in a Soviet air raid, U-413 was lost to a naval mine in the Cornish corridor, U-984 was sunk by Canadian warships in the Bay of Biscay and U-1229 was sunk in the Atlantic Ocean by Allied aircraft.
- Bob Hamilton won the 26th PGA Championship.
- Allies bomb Buna-Werke POW camp in Poland killing 38 British prisoners.
- Born: Graig Nettles, baseball player, in San Diego, California. Rajiv Gandhi, the youngest prime minister of India (6th prime minister of India), in Mumbai (d. 1991).

== August 21, 1944 (Monday) ==
- The Dumbarton Oaks Conference began at the Dumbarton Oaks estate in Washington, D.C. The international conference was to be where the United Nations was to be formulated and negotiated among international leaders.
- The Battle of the Falaise Pocket ended in an Allied victory.
- The Battle of Marseille began in southern France.
- The U.S. Seventh Army captured Aix-en-Provence.
- The battle for Hill 262 in Normandy ended in Polish victory.
- Operation Tractable ended in Allied victory.
- The 2nd Ukrainian Front captured Iași.
- The Canadian corvette Alberni was torpedoed and sunk in the English Channel by German submarine U-480.
- German destroyer Z23 was sunk at La Pallice in an RAF air raid.
- German submarine U-230 ran aground at Toulon and was scuttled.
- The British comedy-drama film A Canterbury Tale starring Eric Portman, Sheila Sim and Dennis Price premiered in the United Kingdom.
- Born: Kari S. Tikka, legal scholar, in Lahti, Finland (d. 2006); Peter Weir, film director, in Sydney, Australia

== August 22, 1944 (Tuesday) ==
- The Royal Navy began Operation Goodwood, a series of carrier raids against the German battleship Tirpitz anchored in northern Norway.
- Nazi occupation forces in Greece began the Holocaust of Kedros. Over the next several days nine villages in the Amari Valley in Crete would be razed and looted and 164 Greek civilians killed.
- The U.S. Seventh Army captured Grenoble.
- German Naval Group Command South ordered the evacuation of Constanța. Admiral Karl Dönitz authorized German ships in this theatre to be scuttled.
- German submarine U-344 was depth charged and sunk in the Barents Sea by Fairey Swordfish aircraft of 825 Squadron, Fleet Air Arm.
- The British frigate Bickerton was scuttled after being torpedoed and damaged in the Barents Sea by U-354.
- Japanese cargo liner Tsushima Maru was sunk by the submarine USS Bowfin while carrying hundreds of schoolchildren from Okinawa to Kagoshima.
- The fantasy drama film Kismet starring Ronald Colman and Marlene Dietrich was released.

== August 23, 1944 (Wednesday) ==
- King Michael's Coup: King Michael I of Romania led a coup that overthrew the pro-Axis government of Ion Antonescu. Constantin Sănătescu became the new prime minister.
- The Battle of Audierne Bay was fought between German and Allied naval flotillas. The result was an Allied victory as eight German ships were sunk.
- Italian partisans captured Baceno, a mountain stronghold on the border with Switzerland.
- The Japanese destroyer Asakaze was torpedoed and sunk in Paluan Bay by the submarine USS Haddo.
- German submarine U-180 was sunk in the Bay of Biscay, either by a mine or a technical malfunction.
- Born: Saira Banu, Bollywood actress, in Mussoorie, British India
- Died: Abdülmecid II, 76, last Caliph of Islam from the Ottoman Dynasty; Nikolai Roslavets, 63, Ukrainian composer

== August 24, 1944 (Thursday) ==
- Germany enacted full mobilization. Theaters were closed, holidays were cancelled and military leave was halted.
- Liberation of Paris: Forces of Free France were the first of the Allies to enter Paris, in the evening.
- The First Canadian Army captured Bernay and crossed the Risle River at Nassandres.
- Constantin Sănătescu became the new prime minister of Romania.
- The American submarine USS Harder was depth charged and sunk in Dasol Bay by Japanese warships.
- German submarine U-354 was depth charged and sunk in the Barents Sea by British warships.
- German submarine U-445 was depth charged and sunk in the Bay of Biscay by the frigate HMS Louis.
- At Buchères in France, men of the 51st SS-Brigade massacred 68 civilians (half of them women) aged from 6 months to above seventy years.
- The Harvard Mark I electro-mechanical computer, developed and built by IBM, was formally presented to Harvard University.
- Born: Christine Chubbuck, news reporter, in Hudson, Ohio (d. 1974); Gregory Jarvis, engineer and astronaut who died in the Space Shuttle Challenger disaster, in Detroit (d. 1986)

== August 25, 1944 (Friday) ==
- The Battle for Paris ended at 2:30 p.m. when the German commander Dietrich von Choltitz surrendered the French capital. At 4 p.m. Charles de Gaulle arrived in the city and walked amid a cheering crowd to the Hôtel de Ville, where he made a rousing speech.
- Romania switched sides and declared war on Germany.
- The Battle of Driniumor River ended in U.S. victory.
- Maillé massacre: 124 residents of the French commune of Maillé, Indre-et-Loire were massacred by the Germans in reprisals for activities by the French Resistance.
- The Red Ball Express truck convoy system began operation to supply Allied forces in France.
- French and American troops liberated Avignon without opposition.
- The British Eighth Army in Italy began Operation Olive, an assault on the eastern end of the Gothic Line.
- German submarines U-18 and U-24 were scuttled at Constanța while U-178 was scuttled at Bordeaux.
- U-667 struck a mine and sank in the Bay of Biscay.
- German destroyer Z24 was bombed and sunk by Allied aircraft off Le Verdon-sur-Mer.
- Japanese destroyer Yūnagi was torpedoed and sunk northeast of Cape Bojeador, Luzon by American submarine Picuda.
- German submarine U-1000 struck a naval mine off Pillau and was rendered unserviceable.
- British Commandos carried out Operation Rumford, an overnight raid on the French Île d'Yeu. When they got there they discovered the Germans had already withdrawn.
- Versailles is liberated by General Leclerc's troops.

== August 26, 1944 (Saturday) ==
- The Battle of Toulon ended in Allied victory.
- Charles de Gaulle headed a liberation parade in Paris, laying a wreath at the Tomb of the Unknown Soldier and ceremonially relighting the eternal flame at the Arc de Triomphe, then marching along the Champs-Élysées to attend a service at Notre Dame to give thanks for the liberation of the city. Sniper fire rang out during the parade, which de Gaulle ignored.
- Japanese destroyer Samidare, having run aground on Velasco Reef off Palau on August 19, was torpedoed and broken in two by the American submarine Batfish.
- Rüsselsheim massacre: Six American airmen were lynched and killed by townspeople of Rüsselsheim am Main.
- Born: Prince Richard, Duke of Gloucester, in Hadley Common, England
- Died: Adam von Trott zu Solz, 35, German lawyer, diplomat and central figure in the 20 July plot (hanged by the Nazis)

== August 27, 1944 (Sunday) ==
- Operation Doppelkopf ended in limited German tactical victory.
- The 6th Tank Army of the 2nd Ukrainian Front captured Focșani.
- The incomplete French battleship Clemenceau was bombed and sunk at Brest by U.S. aircraft.
- Died: Princess Mafalda of Savoy, 41 (died of wounds sustained in a bombing raid on Buchenwald concentration camp)

== August 28, 1944 (Monday) ==
- The Kaunas Offensive ended in Soviet victory.
- Elements of the U.S. First Army crossed the Marne river at Meaux.
- The Liberty ship John Barry was torpedoed and sunk in the Indian Ocean by German submarine U-859.
- The BBC began broadcasting in Dutch to Indonesia and in French to southeast Asia.

== August 29, 1944 (Tuesday) ==
- The Jassy–Kishinev Offensive, Lvov–Sandomierz Offensive and Šiauliai Offensive all ended in Soviet victories.
- The Battle of Marseille ended with the surrender of Germans on the fortified harbour islands.
- The Slovak National Uprising began.
- Operation Goodwood was called off after failure to deal any significant damage to the Tirpitz.
- Allied commanders turned over the administration of Paris to Charles de Gaulle and the French Committee of National Liberation.
- Géza Lakatos replaced Döme Sztójay as Prime Minister of Hungary.

== August 30, 1944 (Wednesday) ==
- The Soviet Union, though not at war with Bulgaria, refused to accept the government's declaration of neutrality.
- The 57th Army of 3rd Ukrainian Front completed the Soviet capture of Constanța.
- Soviet forces entered the important oil centre of Ploiești, Romania. The city had been heavily bombed by the British and Americans in the Oil Campaign and only five refineries producing just 20 percent of normal production were active.
- The Philip Yordan play Anna Lucasta made its Broadway premiere at the Mansfield Theatre.
- Born: Tug McGraw, baseball player, in Martinez, California (d. 2004)

== August 31, 1944 (Thursday) ==
- The 53rd Army of the 2nd Ukrainian Front entered Bucharest, which was already freed from German troops by the Romanian Army.
- The Battle of Sansapor ended in American victory.
- King George VI made Bernard Montgomery a field marshal.
- The U.S. Fifth Army crossed the Arno in Italy.
- In the Raid at Ožbalt, 105 Allied prisoners of war were rescued by Slovene Partisans from a work site in the village of Ožbalt, Reichsgau Steiermark.
- The first of the mysterious Mad Gasser of Mattoon incidents occurred in Mattoon, Illinois. They would end two weeks later as mysteriously as they began.
- Born: Jos LeDuc, professional wrestler, in Montreal, Quebec, Canada (d. 1999)
