= Noshiro Maru =

Japanese merchant cruiser

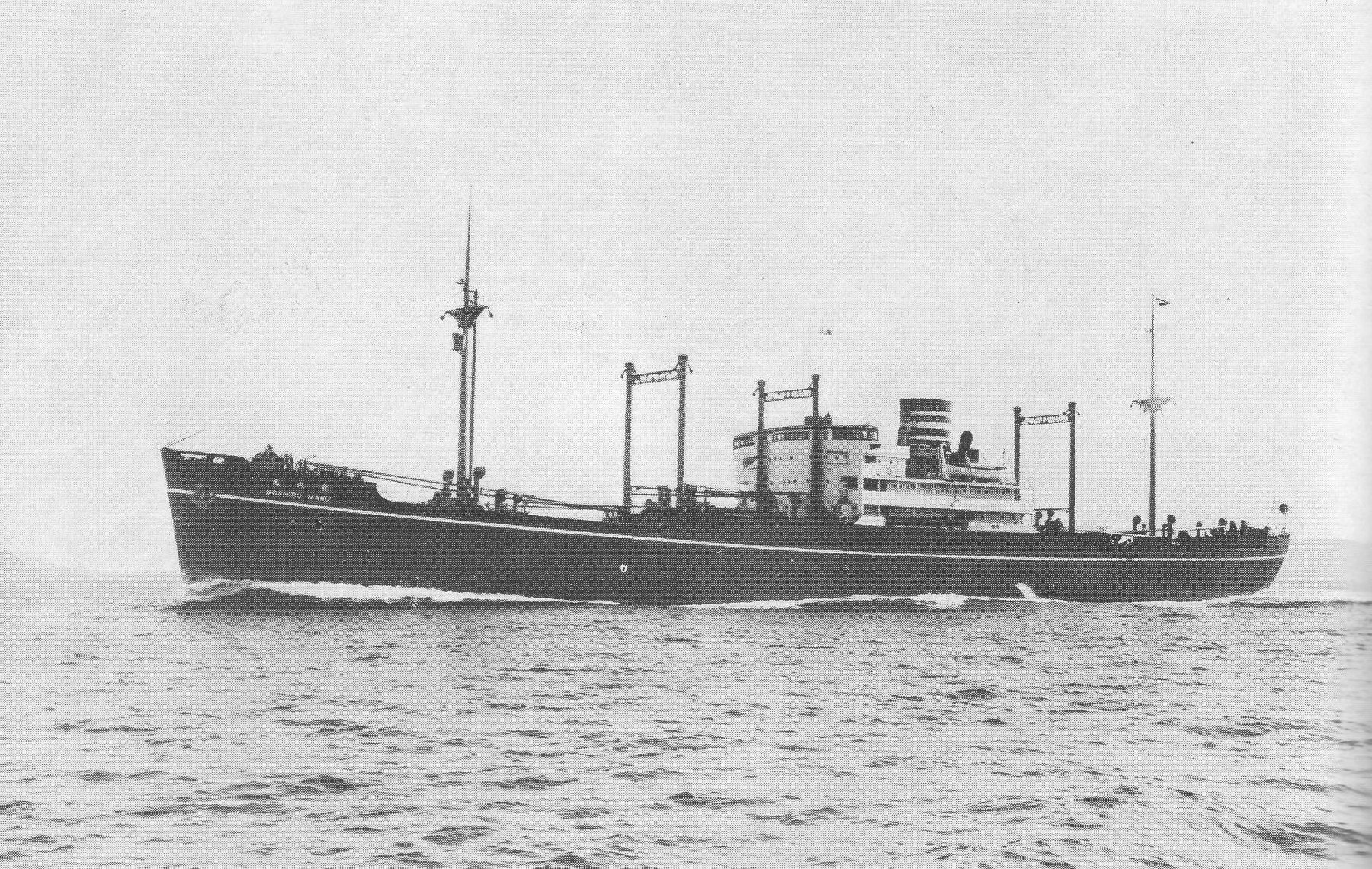
- Noshiro Maru NYK

History
- Name: Noshiro Maru
- Builder: Mitsubishi Heavy Industries Nagasaki
- Laid down: 8 December 1932
- Launched: 28 June 1934
- Completed: 30 November 1934
- Fate: Wrecked 24 September 1944

General characteristics
- Type: Armed Merchant Cruiser
- Tonnage: 7183 GRT
- Length: 448.6 ft (136.7 m)
- Beam: 62.4 ft (19.0 m)
- Draught: 27.8 ft (8.5 m)
- Propulsion: 1 × Mitsubishi diesel engine, 6,700 shp
- Speed: 18.5 knots (21.3 mph; 34.3 km/h)
- Armament: 4 × 6 in (150 mm) guns; 1 × 80 mm (3.1 in) anti-aircraft gun; 2 × machineguns
- Aircraft carried: 2 observation float planes

Noshiro Maru was a Nippon Yusen Kaisen (NYK) Liner completed in 1934 and requisitioned by the Imperial Japanese Army (IJA) in 1937 to transport troops to China following the Marco Polo Bridge Incident. She was later returned to civilian service before being converted to an armed merchant cruiser by the Imperial Japanese Navy (IJN) in 1941. She was bombed twice and torpedoed twice as a World War II troopship before being abandoned at Manila in 1944.

== History ==
Noshiro Maru was completed at Nagasaki in 1934 by Mitsubishi Shipbuilding for the (NYK) Line. Its maiden voyage was to New York City in 1935. Following the Marco Polo Bridge Incident in July, the IJA requisitioned Noshiro Maru as transport No. 226 on 8 August 1937 for moving Japanese infantry to Wusong. Noshiro Maru was part of convoys landing the 18th Infantry Regiment on 2 September and the 36th Infantry Regiment on 26 September. Noshiro Maru resumed commercial service for the NYK line on 7 January 1939, but was requisitioned by the IJN on 1 May 1941 for conversion to a seaplane tender. Priorities were revised, and Noshiro Maru emerged from the conversion process on 14 October 1941 as an armed merchant cruiser.

Noshiro Maru was assigned to the Yokosuka patrol squadron escorting convoys of merchant ships to varied locations including Truk, Ponape, Kwajalein, and Rabaul before being redesignated as a troopship in August 1942. She completed a round trip from Japan to the Marianas and Truk in November 1942 and was detached to Rabaul on 11 December, where she was bombed by a Fifth Air Force Boeing B-17 Flying Fortress on 16 January 1943. Repairs allowed completion of missions to Bougainville Island, the Shortland Islands and Kolombangara before being torpedoed by USS Grayback 100 miles (160 km) northwest of the Bismarck Archipelago on 13 March 1943. Repairs were completed at Yokohama on 21 July 1943.

Noshiro Maru made a round trip from Japan to Balikpapan and Singapore in December 1943 and January 1944. She made a second trip to Singapore in February with convoy Hi-47 and returned to Japan in June with convoy Hi-62. After yard overhaul at Yokohama, she was attached to convoy Hi-71 carrying Operation Shō reinforcements to the Philippines. The convoy sailed into the South China Sea from Mako naval base in the Pescadores on 17 August, and was discovered that evening by USS Redfish. Redfish assembled USS Rasher, Bluefish and Spadefish for a radar-assisted wolfpack attack in typhoon conditions on the night of 18/19 August. Noshiro Maru was one of several ships torpedoed that night, but temporarily beached at Port Currimao to avoid sinking, and reached Manila on 24 August.

While awaiting repairs, Noshiro Maru was caught in Manila Bay by a Task Force 38 air strike on 21 September 1944 and hit by three bombs that afternoon. The first hit the starboard side near the bridge, the second exploded in the radio room, and the third caused an engine room fire. Without engine room power for fire main pressure, the fire spread through the evening causing an ammunition explosion killing three soldiers and six crewmen. Noshiro Maru drifted aground on 24 September at 14°33′N 120°57′E and remained derelict when the United States captured the Philippines.
