= Japanese submarine I-156 =

Imperial Japanese Navy Kaidai-class cruiser submarine of the KD3B sub-class

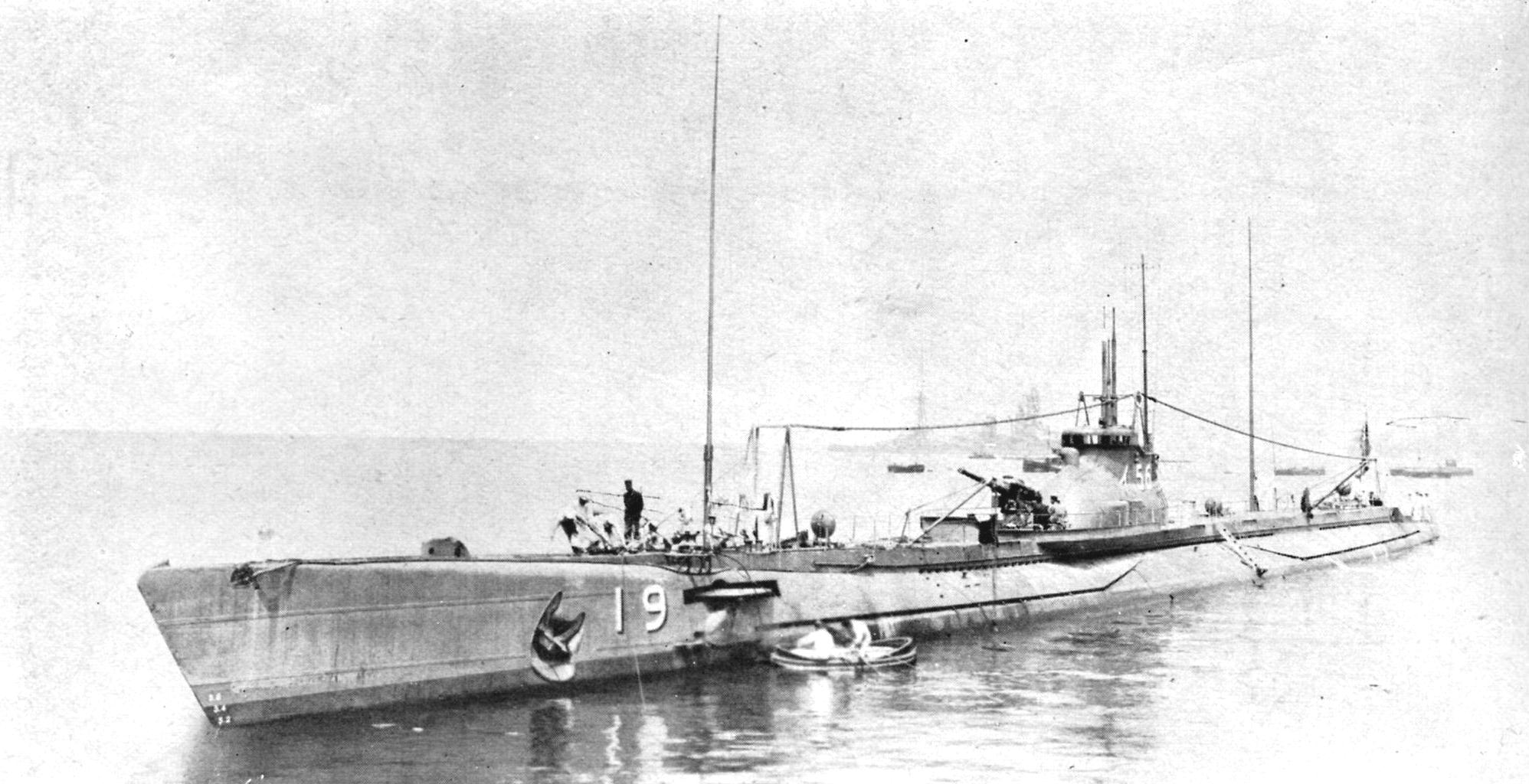
- I-56 in harbor, 1930

History

Empire of Japan
- Name: I-56
- Builder: Kure Naval Arsenal, Kure, Japan
- Laid down: 3 November 1926
- Launched: 23 March 1928
- Completed: 31 March 1929
- Decommissioned: 7 January 1937
- Recommissioned: by 1 December 1937
- Decommissioned: 15 December 1938
- Recommissioned: 15 November 1939
- Renamed: I-156 on 20 May 1942
- Fate: Surrendered 2 September 1945; Stricken 30 November 1945; Scuttled 1 April 1946

General characteristics
- Class & type: Kaidai-class submarine (KD3B Type)
- Displacement: 1,829 t (1,800 long tons) surfaced; 2,337 t (2,300 long tons) submerged
- Length: 101 m (331 ft 4 in)
- Beam: 8 m (26 ft 3 in)
- Draft: 4.9 m (16 ft 1 in)
- Installed power: 6,800 bhp (5,100 kW) (diesels); 1,800 hp (1,300 kW) (electric motors)
- Propulsion: Diesel-electric; 2 × diesel engines; 2 × electric motors
- Speed: 20 knots (37 km/h; 23 mph) surfaced; 8 knots (15 km/h; 9.2 mph) submerged
- Range: 10,000 nmi (19,000 km; 12,000 mi) at 10 knots (19 km/h; 12 mph) surfaced; 90 nmi (170 km; 100 mi) at 3 knots (5.6 km/h; 3.5 mph) submerged
- Test depth: 60 m (200 ft)
- Complement: 60
- Armament: 8 × 533 mm (21 in) torpedo tubes (6 bow, 2 stern); 1 × 120 mm (4.7 in) deck gun; 2 x kaiten (added April 1945)

I-56, later I-156, was an Imperial Japanese Navy Kaidai-class cruiser submarine of the KD3B sub-class commissioned in 1929. During World War II, she supported Japanese forces during the invasion of Malaya in December 1941, the Dutch East Indies campaign in early 1942, and the Battle of Midway in June 1942. Except for brief service in the Aleutian Islands campaign in 1943, she subsequently served on training duties until selected for use as a kaiten manned suicide torpedo carrier in 1945. She surrendered to the Allies in 1945 after the end of the war and was scuttled in 1946.

== Design and description ==
The submarines of the KD3B sub-class were essentially repeats of the preceding KD3A sub-class with minor modifications to improve seakeeping. They displaced 1,829 metric tons (1,800 long tons) surfaced and 2,337 metric tons (2,300 long tons) submerged. The submarines were 101 meters (331 ft 4 in) long and had a beam of 8 meters (26 ft 3 in) and a draft of 4.9 meters (16 ft 1 in). The submarines had a diving depth of 60 metres (197 ft) and a complement of 60 officers and crewmen.

For surface running, the submarines were powered by two 3,400-brake-horsepower (2,535 kW) diesel engines, each driving one propeller shaft. When submerged each propeller was driven by a 900-horsepower (671 kW) electric motor. The submarines could reach 20 knots (37 km/h; 23 mph) on the surface and 8 knots (15 km/h; 9.2 mph) submerged. On the surface, the KD3Bs had a range of 10,000 nautical miles (19,000 km; 12,000 mi) at 10 knots (19 km/h; 12 mph); submerged, they had a range of 90 nmi (170 km; 100 mi) at 3 knots (5.6 km/h; 3.5 mph).

The submarines had eight internal 533 mm (21 in) torpedo tubes, six in the bow and two in the stern. They carried one reload for each tube for a total of 16 torpedoes. They also had one 120 mm (4.7 in) deck gun.

== Construction and commissioning ==
Built by the Kure Naval Arsenal at Kure, Japan, I-56 was laid down on 3 November 1926, launched on 23 March 1928, and completed and commissioned on 31 March 1929.

== Service history ==
=== Pre-World War II ===
On the day of her commissioning, I-56 was attached to the Kure Naval District. On 1 April 1929, she was assigned to Submarine Division 19. Her division in turn was assigned to Submarine Squadron 2 in the 2nd Fleet, a component of the Combined Fleet, although sources disagree on whether this also took place on 1 April 1929 or not until 30 November 1929. On 1 December 1931 her division was reassigned to the Kure Guard Squadron in the Kure Nava District.

On 20 May 1932, Submarine Division 19 began another assignment to Submarine Squadron 2 in the 2nd Fleet. I-56 got underway from Sasebo, Japan, on 29 June 1933 with the other submarines of her squadron — I-53, I-54 and I-55 of Submarine Division 18 and Submarine Division 19′s I-57 and I-58 — for a training cruise off China and Mako in the Pescadores Islands, which the submarines concluded with their arrival at Takao, Formosa, on 5 July 1933. They departed Takao on 13 July 1933 and again trained in Chinese waters before arriving in Tokyo Bay on 21 August 1933. On 25 August 1933, all six submarines took part in a fleet review at Yokohama, Japan. On 27 September 1934, I-56 departed Ryojun, Manchukuo, in company with I-57, I-58, and the submarines I-61, I-62, I-64, I-65, I-66, and I-67 for a training cruise off Qingdao, China, which the nine submarines concluded with their arrival at Sasebo on 5 October 1934. Submarine Division 19 began another assignment to the Kure Guard Squadron in the Kure Naval District on 15 November 1934.

Submarine Division 19 returned to duty with the Combined Fleet on 15 November 1935, this time assigned to Submarine Squadron 1 in the 1st Fleet. I-56 got underway on 1 February 1936 for naval maneuvers off Honshu and during the maneuvers suffered minor damage in a collision with I-53 32 nautical miles (59 km; 37 mi) southeast of the Daiosaki lighthouse at 10:16 on 27 February 1936 while both submarines were operating on the surface in poor visibility. Tragedy struck on 18 December 1935 when a sudden gale hit while I-56 was anchored in Kure harbor and her liberty boat capsized at 06:50 with the loss of her commanding officer and four engineers; after sunrise, only a single survivor from the boat was rescued. Submarine Division 19 was reassigned directly to the Kure Naval District on 1 December 1936.

Submarine Division 19 was reduced to the First Reserve in the Kure Naval District on 7 January 1937, and I-56, was decommissioned that day. By 1 December 1937 she apparently had been recommissioned, and she resumed her direct assignment to the Kure Naval District on 1 January 1938. Her division was reduced to the Third Reserve in the Kure Naval District on 15 December 1938. I-56 resumed active service on 15 November 1939, when Submarine Division 19 was reassigned to Submarine Squadron 4 in the 1st Fleet. On 15 November 1940, the squadron was assigned directly to the Combined Fleet.

As the Japanese armed forces mobilized for an offensive against Allied forces that would begin the Pacific campaign of World War II, I-56 departed Kure, Japan, on 20 November 1941 bound for Samah on China′s Hainan Island, which she reached on 26 November 1941. All three submarines departed Samah on 1 December 1941 to take up positions to support the offensive. Tasked with supporting Operation E, the Japanese invasion of British Malaya, I-56 proceeded to her patrol area in the South China Sea northwest of the Anambas Islands.

=== World War II ===
==== First war patrol ====
Hostilities began in East Asia on 8 December 1941 (7 December across the International Date Line in Hawaii, where Japan began the war with its attack on Pearl Harbor). The Japanese invasion of British Malaya began that day. On 8 December, I-56 unsuccessfully attacked a Royal Netherlands Navy submarine — probably HNLMS K XVII — east of the Malay Peninsula. On 11 December, she attacked the Norwegian 1,186-gross register ton merchant ship Hai Tung — which was on a voyage from Bangkok, Siam, to Singapore, with a cargo of rice and general supplies — with gunfire, sinking her with the loss of her entire crew of 50 east of British Malaya at 05°08′N 104°32′E.

Early on the morning of 14 December 1941, the Dutch submarine HNLMS K XII detected faint propeller noises, apparently those of a Japanese submarine, and at 11:00 sighted a periscope to starboard. K XII steered to ram the Japanese submarine and had closed to 100 meters (109 yd) of where lookouts had last seen the periscope when the periscope reappeared in port. K XII abandoned the ramming attempt and broke contact by zigzagging away. The submarine she attempted to ram probably was I-54, I-55, or I-56. I-56 arrived at Cam Ranh Bay in Japanese-occupied French Indochina on 20 December 1941.

==== Second war patrol ====
I-56 departed Cam Ranh Bay on 28 December 1941 to begin her second war patrol, assigned a patrol area in the Indian Ocean southwest of Tjilatjap, Java, in the Netherlands East Indies. Her first success came on 4 January 1942, when she sank the 2,626-gross register ton British cargo ship Kwangtung with gunfire south of Java at 09°12′S 111°10′E. One source states that I-56 rammed one of Kwangtung′s lifeboats and machine-gunned others, and that out of 98 crewmen and 35 military personnel aboard, only 35 survived to be rescued the following day. Early on the morning of 5 January, she surfaced and opened gunfire on the Dutch 8,169-gross register ton armed merchant ship Tanimbar 40 nautical miles (74 km; 46 mi) southeast of Tjilatjap, damaging the ship, but abandoned the attack and submerged when Tanimbar returned fire.

While submerged about 80 nautical miles (150 km; 92 mi) southwest of Tjilatjap, I-56 hit the Dutch 3,032-gross register ton steamer SS Van Ress — which was on a voyage from Tjilatjap to Emmahaven on Sumatra — in the engine room with one torpedo at around 06:00 on 8 January 1942, killing six of her crewmen. Van Rees listed to port before sinking at 07°53′S 106°11′E. I-56 surfaced and her commanding officer questioned the survivors about Van Rees′s cargo and destination. Later that day, at around 21:00, I-56 sank the Dutch 2,263-gross register ton passenger ship Van Riebeeck with gunfire at 08°11′S 108°47′E, killing 13 members of her crew. The Royal Netherlands Navy minelayer HNLMS Willem van der Zaan rescued the survivors.

Off Bali on the afternoon of 12 January 1942, I-56 fired a torpedo at the Dutch 2,065-gross register ton merchant ship Patras, which was making a voyage from Surabaya on the southeast coast of Java to Tandjong Priok in Batavia on Java′s northwest coast. After Patras evaded the torpedo, I-56 surfaced and opened gunfire. As Patras worked up to her maximum speed of 13 knots (24 km/h; 15 mph), she took several hits in her stern and caught fire. A Netherlands Naval Aviation Service Dornier Do 24K flying boat arrived on the scene, and I-56 dived to avoid attack by the aircraft. Lacking depth charges with which to attack the submerged submarine, the Do-24K departed, and I-56 surfaced to resume her attack on Patras, firing two more rounds at her just before Patras reached safety in the harbor at Banjoewangi on the eastern tip of Java. Although some of Patras′s crew were wounded, she suffered no fatalities, and her damage was minor. I-56 concluded her patrol with her arrival at Cam Ranh Bay on 18 January 1942.

==== Third war patrol ====
I-56 began her third war patrol — as part of the A Group — on 31 January 1942, departing Cam Ranh Bay bound for a patrol area in the Indian Ocean at the southern entrance of the Sunda Strait between Java and Sumatra. After refueling at an advance base in the Anambas Islands, she reached her patrol area on 2 February 1942. On 4 February, she attacked the Dutch 979-gross register ton merchant ship Togian — steaming with Convoy JS.1 — with gunfire at the southern entrance to the Sunda Strait. Togian survived, but later was scuttled at Koepang on the western tip of Timor. On 11 February, I-56 reported attacking an Allied merchant ship at the southern entrance of the strait in the vicinity of 07°S 105°E. She concluded her patrol with her arrival at Staring Bay on the coast of the Celebes on 21 February 1942.

==== Fourth war patrol ====
On 5 March 1942, I-56 got underway for her fourth war patrol, departing Staring Bay for a patrol area in the Indian Ocean off Tjilatjap, Java. On 9 March, she sighted the 30-foot (9.1 m) lifeboat Scorpion, which was carrying 12 Allied airmen escaping from Tjilitjap as it fell to Japanese forces and made for Roebourne, Western Australia. I-56 surfaced, and her commanding officer personally observed Scorpion through binoculars before allowing her to proceed unmolested, and Scorpion eventually reached Australia after 47 days at sea.

While I-56 was at sea, Submarine Squadron 4 was disbanded on 10 March 1942, and Submarine Division 19 — consisting of I-56, I-57, and I-58 — was reassigned to Submarine Squadron 5. I-56 concluded her patrol on 12 March 1942 with her return to Staring Bay.

==== March–May 1942 ====
On 13 March 1942, I-56 departed Staring Bay bound for Kure, Japan, which she reached on 20 March 1942. She got back underway from Kure on 14 May 1942 and set course for Kwajalein Atoll. During her voyage, she was renumbered I-156 on 20 May 1942. She arrived at Kwajalein on 24 May 1942.

==== Fifth war patrol: The Battle of Midway ====
On 26 May 1942, I-156 departed Kwajalein to conduct her fifth war patrol, operating in support of Operation MI, the planned Japanese invasion of Midway Atoll in the Northwestern Hawaiian Islands, in which Submarine Squadron 5 formed part of the Advance Expeditionary Force. She operated in a patrol line between 28°20′N 162°20′W and 26°00′N 165°00′W which also included the submarines I-157, I-158, I-159, I-162, I-165, and I-166. The Japanese suffered a decisive defeat on 4 June 1942 during the Battle of Midway, and that day the commander-in-chief of the 6th Fleet, Vice Admiral Teruhisa Komatsu, ordered the 15 submarines in the Japanese submarine patrol line to move westward.

After the commander-in-chief of the Combined Fleet, Admiral Isoroku Yamamoto, ordered Komatsu to interpose his submarines between the retreating Japanese fleet and the opposing United States Navy aircraft carriers, the Japanese submarines, including I-156, began a gradual movement to the north-northwest, moving at 3 knots (5.6 km/h; 3.5 mph) by day and 14 knots (26 km/h; 16 mph) after dark. At about 04:00 on 5 June 1942, I-156 sighted the U.S. Navy oiler USS Guadalupe (AO-32) escorted by two destroyers 550 nautical miles (1,020 km; 630 mi) east of Midway, but could not get into a firing position. The only Japanese submarine other than I-168 (Note: I-168 torpedoed and sank the badly damaged aircraft carrier USS Yorktown (CV-5) and the destroyer USS Hammann (DD-412) during the Battle of Midway.) to make contact with enemy forces during the battle, I-156 returned to Kwajalein on 20 June 1942.

==== June 1942–May 1943 ====
On 22 June 1942 I-156 got underway from Kwajalein bound for Kure, Japan, which she reached on 30 June 1942. On 10 July 1942, Submarine Squadron 5 was disbanded, and Submarine Division 19, consisting of I-156, I-157, I-158, and I-159, was assigned to the Kure Naval District. I-156, I-157, and I-158 assumed duty as training ships at the Kure Submarine School.

==== Aleutian Islands campaign ====
On 21 May 1943, Japanese Imperial General Headquarters decided to withdraw the garrison on Kiska in the Aleutian Islands and bring the Aleutian Islands campaign to a close. I-156 was attached temporarily to Submarine Squadron 1 — along with the submarines I-2, I-7, I-21, I-24, I-34, I-36, I-155, I-157, I-168, I-169, and I-171 — for the evacuation of the island.

I-156 departed Kure on 22 May 1943, called at Yokosuka, Japan, from 23 to 26 May, and then got underway for Paramushiro in the Kuril Islands. While she was at sea, she was assigned to the Kiska Evacuation Force in the Northern District Force of the 5th Fleet on 29 May 1943. She arrived at Paramushiro on 1 June 1943.

After refueling along with I-7, I-21, I-155, and I-157 from the oiler Teiyō Maru on 2 June 1943, I-156 put to sea from Paramushiro on 4 June to make a supply run to Kiska with a cargo of three tons of ammunition and two tons of food. She arrived at Kiska on 15 June 1943, but had to submerge almost immediately to avoid damage during an Allied air raid. After resurfaciung, unloading her cargo, and embarking 60 passengers, she got back underway the same day bound for Paramushiro, which she reached on 20 June. She departed Paramushiro on 21 June 1943 and made for Kure, where she arrived on 26 June. With her Aleutians service complete, she again was attached to the Kure Naval District on 28 June 1943.

==== June 1943–September 1945 ====
Along with the other submarines of Submarine Division 19 — I-157, I-158, and I-159 — I-156 returned to training duties at Kure. She continued in this role until 1 April 1945, when she was reassigned to Submarine Division 34 for service as a carrier of kaiten manned suicide attack torpedoes. Modified to carry two kaiten, she made three voyages between May and August 1945 to transport kaiten from Ōzushima in the Seto Inland Sea to kaiten shore bases along the coast of Kyushu.

In July 1945, I-156′s crew, along with the crews of I-157, I-158, I-159, and I-162, began training to launch kaiten attacks in the event of an invasion of Japan by Allied forces. Although Emperor Hirohito announced the end of hostilities on 15 August 1945, I-155 and I-156 departed Hirao on 25 August 1945 as part of the Shinshu-tai ("Land of Gods Unit") kaiten group to attack Allied shipping, but the kaiten operation was cancelled and they quickly were recalled. I-156 surrendered to the Allies on 2 September 1945.

== Disposal ==
The Japanese removed I-156 from the Navy list on 30 November 1945. She was moved to Sasebo and stripped of all useful equipment. On 1 April 1946, the U.S. Navy submarine tender USS Nereus (AS-17) towed her from Sasebo to an area off the Gotō Islands, where she was scuttled with explosive charges, one of a number of Japanese submarines scuttled that day in Operation Road's End. She sank at 32°37′N 129°17′E.
