= Convoy Hi-71 =

1944 Japanese convoy attacked by the US

- Part of World War II, Pacific War
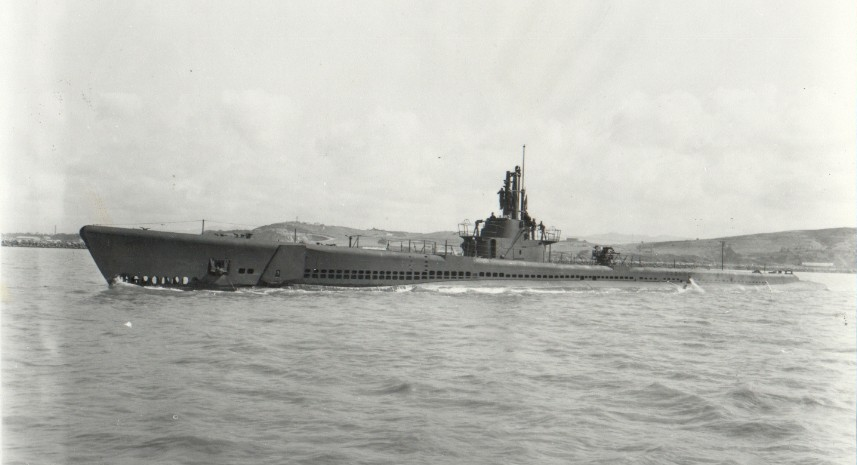
- Port side view of USS Spadefish in May 1944.
Date	August 18–19, 1944
Location	South China Sea
Result	United States victory

Belligerents
United States	Japan

Commanders and leaders
Glynn R. Donaho	(Empire of Japan) Sadamichi Kajioka

Units involved
2 Wolfpacks	6th Escort Group; 931st Air Group

Strength
9 submarines	1 escort carrier 3 destroyers 9 kaibōkan 13 merchant ships

Casualties and losses
60 killed 1 submarine sunk	~8,000 killed 7 merchant ships sunk 1 escort carrier sunk 2 destroyers sunk 3 kaibōkan sunk

Convoy Hi-71 (ヒ-71) was one of the World War II Hi convoys of fast tankers and troop transports from Japan to Singapore. The heavily defended convoy was specially loaded with reinforcements for defense of the Philippines, and encountered a wolfpack of United States Navy submarines in the South China Sea after being scattered by an August 1944 typhoon. Personnel losses were high because heavy seas prevented rescue of crewmen from sunken ships.

== Background ==
Japanese shipping through the South China Sea carried much of the food sustaining the Japanese population, the petroleum fueling Japan's aircraft and warships, and the raw materials for World War II. Japanese aircraft and warships patrolled South China Sea shipping lanes from bases in the Philippines; and loss of those bases would threaten the flow of resources needed to defend the Empire of Japan.

As Allied forces converged to fulfill Douglas MacArthur's promised return, Japan implemented Operation Shō to defend the Philippines. Convoy Hi-71 carried Imperial Japanese Army troops, weaponry and supplies from the home islands of Japan to reinforce the Philippines. The convoy left Moji on 8 August 1944 accompanied by the 6th Escort Group of two destroyers and five kaibōkan with an escort carrier embarking the 931st Air Group detachment of a dozen Nakajima B5N "Kate" attack planes. As the convoy departed the Mako naval base in the Pescadores on 17 August, it was reinforced by another destroyer and four kaibōkan to counter United States submarines operating in the Luzon Strait.

Two submarine wolfpacks were waiting in the convoy path. USS Spadefish and Redfish operated as "Donc's Devils", under command of Glynn R. Donaho, commanding officer of USS Picuda. The other three submarines were Rasher, Bluefish and Raton.

== Battle of 18 and 19 August ==
Redfish found the convoy on the evening of 17 August, and maneuvered into position to launch four torpedoes at a large ship and a fifth torpedo at the escort carrier. Eiyo Maru was hit by a torpedo at 0524 on 18 August. Asakaze and Yūnagi were detached to escort the damaged ship back to Takao as a typhoon developed with force 12 winds from the southeast. Picuda and Spadefish were unable to locate the convoy in the deteriorating visibility, and heavy seas loosened plates on the superstructure of Redfish. The convoy became scattered and disorganized in heavy weather and darkness.

Rasher observed nine successive aircraft contacts to the north on the afternoon of 18 August and deduced these were air patrols for an important convoy. That dark, rainy night Rasher's radar picked up thirteen ships of convoy Hi-71 proceeding at 13-knot (24 km/h) and protected by six escorts. After a surfaced approach to 2,800 yards (2,600 m), two stern torpedoes were launched at Teiyō Maru at 2122. Both torpedoes hit; and the tanker loaded with gasoline exploded into a column of flame 1,000 feet (300 m) high, with parts of the ship being blown 500 yards (460 m) from the flaming hulk. The escorts fired wildly and laid depth charge patterns astern of Rasher. In a second surfaced approach to 3,300 yards (3,000 m) Rasher launched a spread of six bow torpedoes at 2310. Three torpedoes hit and sank the transport Teia Maru, killing 2,665 Japanese soldiers, and a fourth torpedo was heard exploding at a timed range of 3900 yards. Rasher swung hard left to launch four stern torpedoes at 2214. Three torpedoes hit and sank the escort carrier Taiyō, and the fourth torpedo was heard exploding on a more distant ship.

Rasher pulled away to reload torpedo tubes and the convoy split into two groups. Rasher followed three large ships with one kaibōkan moving northwest while Bluefish intercepted the remaining ships continuing southwesterly and fired torpedoes at two tankers. At least one torpedo hit Awa Maru, and Hayasui burst into flame and sank stern first after being hit by two or three torpedoes at 0320.

Rasher launched four bow torpedoes shortly after midnight at a range of 2,200 yards (2,000 m), and three hits on the cargo-transport Eishin Maru caused an ammunition detonation with the pressure wave sweeping over the submarine's bridge. The fourth torpedo was heard exploding on a more distant ship. Rasher then swung hard right to launch two stern torpedoes. Both torpedoes hit at 0033 and Noshiro Maru slowed to 5 knots (9.3 km/h) reversing course and firing briefly at Etorofu believing it to be the attacking submarine.

Other portions of the scattered convoy were attacked by Redfish and Spadefish. Japanese sources indicate Tamatsu Maru simply disappeared. Uncertainty remains about which submarines launched torpedoes striking the ships of convoy Hi-71; but JANAC credited Spadefish with sinking Tamatsu Maru fleeing northward at 0333. Sado, Matsuwa and Hiburi attempted to hold the American submarines down while Noshiro Maru and Awa Maru beached themselves at Port Currimao to avoid sinking, and undamaged ships took refuge in San Fernando, La Union.

== Manila ==
After convoy Hi-71 reformed in San Fernando, it arrived in Manila on 21 August. Awa Maru was towed into Manila the same day, and Noshiro Maru reached Manila on 24 August. Sado, Matsuwa and Hiburi were intercepted by USS Harder and Haddo as they attempted to rejoin their convoy in Manila. Matsuwa and Hiburi were torpedoed by Harder at 0456, and Sado was torpedoed by Haddo at 0524 while attempting to aid the stricken sister kaibōkan. Additional torpedoes were required to sink the three kaibōkan. Haddo sank Sado with a three torpedo salvo at 0720, while Harder sank Matsuwa at 0649 and Hiburi at 0755.

Asakaze and Yūnagi departed Takao on 21 August to rejoin the convoy at Manila with the new tankers Hakko Maru No. 2 and Niyo Maru bound for Singapore. Spadefish hit Hakko Maru No. 2 with two torpedoes off Cape Bojeador Lighthouse at 1455 on 22 August. The damaged tanker was beached in Pasaleng Bay while Yūnagi stood by. Spadefish fired four more torpedoes at the beached tanker until a depth charge attack by Yūnagi chased away the submarine. Yūnagi was relieved of responsibility for Hakko Maru No. 2 on 25 August and was sunk an hour later by Picuda. Hakko Maru No. 2 remained beached until destroyed by heavy surf on 18 September.

Asakaze escorted Niyo Maru toward Manila. Haddo hit Asakaze with its last torpedo at 0800 23 August. As USS Hake and Harder approached to finish off the damaged destroyer (which had already sunk), they were intercepted at 0630 on 24 August by CD No. 22 and the captured United States destroyer Patrol Boat No. 102. Harder fired a salvo of torpedoes at CD No. 22, and was spotted by a Japanese aircraft which marked the location. Harder was sunk at 15°50′N 119°43′E by Patrol Boat No. 102 in an attack beginning at 0828.

The reformed convoy Hi-71, less the surviving Philippine reinforcements, left Manila on 26 August escorted by Fujinami, Hirato, Kurahishi and Mikura, and reached Singapore on 1 September. The unrepaired Noshiro Maru remained in Manila Bay until destroyed on 21 September by aircraft of Task Force 38.

== Japanese ships in convoy Hi-71 ==
Name	Type	Tonnage (GRT)	Dead	Notes
Hayasui	fleet oiler	18,300		sunk by Bluefish at 17°34′N 119°23′E
Irako	food-supply ship	9,570		
Teiyō Maru	tanker	9,845	99	sunk by Rasher at 18°19′N 120°13′E
Eiyō Maru	tanker	8,672		damaged by Redfish at 20°28′N 121°04′E but repaired in Takao
Teia Maru	transport	17,537	2,665	former French liner; sunk by Rasher at 18°16′N 120°21′E
Awa Maru	transport	11,249P		damaged by Bluefish at 17°36′N 119°38′E but repaired in Manila
Noto Maru	transport	7,191		
Hokkai Maru	transport	8,416		
Tamatsu Maru	landing craft depot ship	9,589	4,406-4,755	sunk by Spadefish at 18°48′N 119°47′E
Noshiro Maru	armed merchant cruiser	7,184		damaged by Rasher at 18°09′N 119°56′E and later destroyed by aircraft
Mayasan Maru	landing craft depot ship	9,433		
Eishin Maru	cargo-transport			sunk by Rasher at 18°16′N 120°21′E
Hakko Maru No. 2	tanker	10,023<		damaged by Spadefish at 18°48′N 120°46′E and destroyed by heavy surf after beaching
Niyo Maru	tanker	10,022		
Taiyō	escort carrier	17,830	747	sunk by Rasher at 18°16′N 120°21′E
Fujinami	destroyer	2,077		
Yūnagi	destroyer	1,270	38	sunk by Picuda at 18°45′N 120°44′E
Asakaze	destroyer	1,270	0	sunk by Haddo at 16°06′N 119°44′E
Hirato	kaibōkan	870		
Kurahashi	kaibōkan	940		
Mikura	kaibōkan	940		
Shonan	kaibōkan	940		
CD No. 11	kaibōkan	745		
Sado	kaibōkan	870	73	sunk by Haddo at 14°15′N 120°05′E
Etorofu	kaibōkan	870		
Matsuwa	kaibōkan	870	134	sunk by Harder at 14°15′N 120°05′E
Hiburi	kaibōkan	940	154	sunk by Harder at 14°15′N 120°05′E

== See also ==
- Convoy Battles of World War II

== Sources ==
- Blair, Clay (1975). Silent Victory. New York: J.B. Lippincott Company. ISBN 9780397007530.
- Cressman, Robert J. (2000). The Official Chronology of the U.S. Navy in World War II. Washington, D.C.: Naval Institute Press. ISBN 1-55750-149-1.
- Morison, Samuel E. (2002). History of United States Naval Operations in World War II: Leyte, June 1944 – January 1945. Vol. XII. University of Illinois Press. ISBN 0-252-07063-1.
- Watts, Anthony J. (1967). Japanese Warships of World War II. New York: Doubleday & Company.
