= Japanese landing craft carrier Tamatsu Maru =

Japanese ship

Tamatsu Maru
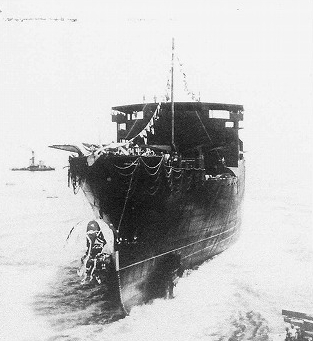

History

Empire of Japan
- Builder: Mitsui Shipbuilding
- Laid down: 4 November 1942
- Launched: 18 August 1943
- Completed: 20 January 1944
- Fate: Sunk, 19 August 1944

General characteristics
- Class & type: Type A Special Purpose Ship
- Type: Landing craft carrier
- Tonnage: 11,910 tons
- Length: 459.1 ft (139.9 m)
- Beam: 62.4 ft (19.0 m)
- Draft: 23.1 ft (7.0 m)
- Installed power: Diesel engines, 10,800 hp (8,100 kW)
- Speed: 20.8 knots (38.5 km/h; 23.9 mph)
- Armament: 6 × 75 mm AA guns; 20 × 13.2 mm machine guns; 20 × Daihatsu landing craft

Tamatsu Maru (玉津丸) was a World War II Japanese "Type A" landing craft depot ship completed in January 1944 and remembered for the heavy loss of life when sunk by USS Spadefish on 19 August 1944. Between 4,406 and 4,755 Japanese soldiers and seamen drowned.

== Early history ==
Tamatsu Maru was laid down at Mitsui Shipbuilding on 4 November 1942, launched on 18 August 1943, and completed on 20 January 1944. Its first military loading was from Moji to Manila with convoy Hi-45 in February 1944. It returned to Japan in March to transport elements of the 30th Infantry Division of the Imperial Japanese Army (IJA) from Pusan to the Philippines with convoy Hi-63 in May. It returned to Japan with convoy Hi-62 in early June to transport the IJA 5th Field Heavy Artillery and 58th Independent Mixed Brigade to the Philippines with convoy MOMA-01 in July. It returned to Japan in early August with convoy Hi-68.

== Loss ==
Tamatsu Maru departed Pusan on 8 August 1944 carrying the Japanese 2nd Battalion and regimental headquarters of the 13th Independent Infantry Regiment from Korea for defense of the Philippines. It joined convoy Hi-71 departing Moji on 10 August, and stopping at the Mako naval base in the Pescadores on 15 August. Convoy Hi-71 departed Mako on 17 August and was discovered by USS Redfish that evening. Redfish assembled other submarines for a radar-guided wolfpack attack on the evening of 18 August in heavy rain.

As the convoy was scattered by heavy seas and evasive maneuvers, Tamatsu Maru apparently became separated from convoy escorts. On 19 August, around 03:30, Spadefish found Tamatsu Maru on a northerly course and fired a salvo of six torpedoes. Spadefish heard two torpedoes hit. Convoy escorts were unaware of the ship's location (17°34′N 119°24′E) until one of them discovered thousands of floating bodies that afternoon. The sinking of Tamatsu Maru was the fourth worst loss of life on any Japanese vessel during the war taking down 4,755 troops and 135 merchant seamen.

== See also ==
- List by death toll of ships sunk by submarines

== Sources ==
- Blair, Clay (1975). Silent Victory. New York: J.B. Lippincott Company. ISBN 9780397007530.
- Cressman, Robert J. (2000). The Official Chronology of the U.S. Navy in World War II. Washington, D.C.: Naval Institute Press. ISBN 1-55750-149-1.
- "Tamatsu Maru (+1944)". WreckSite.
