= Hi convoys =

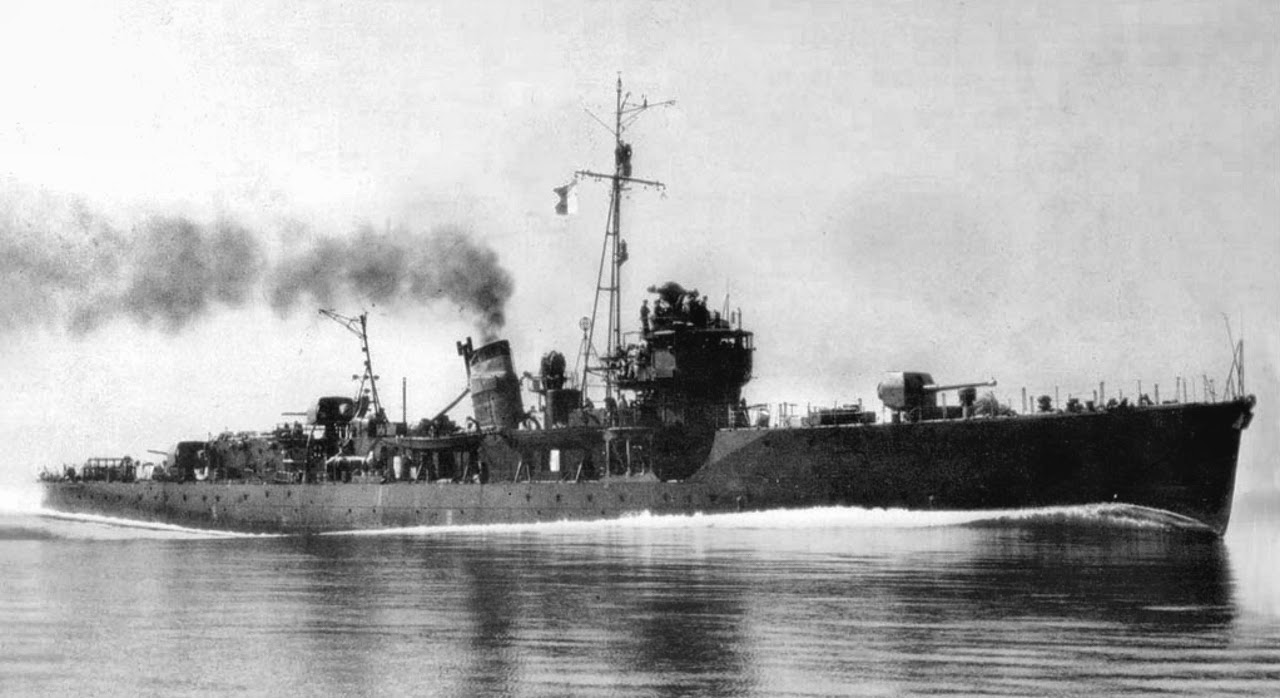
IJN Shimushu was one of the Kaibōkan escorting Hi convoys.

Hi convoys (ヒ) were a numbered series of World War II trade convoys between Japan and Singapore. Merchant ships from Moji and Kaibōkan from Sasebo formed southbound convoys in Imari Bay to carry supplies for the Burma Campaign. Northbound convoys transported food, petroleum, and raw materials to Japan from the captured European colonies of the Dutch East Indies, French Indochina, and British Malaya and Burma. These convoys were initiated in mid-1943 to protect fast, high-value tankers and troopships from the improved effectiveness of Mark 14 torpedoes carried by United States submarines.

Convoy routing was through the East China Sea, Formosa Strait, and South China Sea. Ships often joined or left convoys at the Formosan ports of Takao and Keelung, at the Mako naval base in the Pescadores, and at the Vietnamese ports of Cape Saint Jacques and Cam Ranh Bay. Some convoys stopped at Manila until MATA and TAMA feeder convoys between MAnila and TAkao enabled Hi convoys to avoid United States submarine wolfpacks in the Luzon Strait by hugging the Asian coast between Hainan and Shanghai.

== Convoy dates ==
Number	Direction	Imari Bay	Singapore	Notes
Hi-1	South	10 July 1943	19 July 1943	
Hi-2	North	3 August 1943	23 July 1943	
Hi-3	South	19 July 1943	1 August 1943	Attacked by USS Sawfish on 22 July
Hi-4	North	15 August 1943	5 August 1943	
Hi-5	South	7 August 1943	19 August 1943	
Hi-6	North	3 September 1943	24 August 1943	
Hi-7	South	25 August 1943	6 September 1943	
Hi-8	North	21 September 1943	11 September 1943	
Hi-9	South	10 September 1943		Terminated 21 September 1943 at Cape Saint Jacques
Hi-10	North	9 October 1943		Originated 28 September 1943 at Cape Saint Jacques
Hi-11	South	25 September 1943	4 October 1943	
Hi-12	North	21 October 1943	10 October 1943	
Hi-13	South	12 October 1943	30 October 1943	
Hi-14	North	16 November 1943	3 November 1943	Attacked by USS Bluefish on 8 November
Hi-15				Did not sail
Hi-16				Did not sail
Hi-17	South	28 October 1943	11 November 1943	
Hi-18	North	28 November 1943	15 November 1943	
Hi-19				Did not sail
Hi-20				Did not sail
Hi-21	South	20 November 1943	14 December 1943	
Hi-22				Did not sail
Hi-23	South	1 December 1943	14 December 1943	
Hi-24	North	4 January 1944	19 December 1943	
Hi-25	South	11 December 1943	21 December 1943	
Hi-26	North		26 December 1943	
Hi-27	South	21 December 1943	2 January 1944	Attacked by USS Flying Fish on 27 December
Hi-28	North	17 January 1944	8 January 1944	
Hi-29	South	31 December 1943	15 January 1944	
Hi-30	North	12 February 1944	19 January 1944	
Hi-31	South	11 January 1944	20 January 1944	
Hi-32	North	4 February 1944	25 January 1944	
Hi-33	South	10 January 1944	23 January 1944	
Hi-34	North	10 February 1944	27 January 1944	
Hi-35				Did not sail
Hi-36				Did not sail
Hi-37	South	20 January 1944	29 January 1944	
Hi-38	North	13 February 1944	2 February 1944	
Hi-39	South	26 January 1944	9 February 1944	
Hi-40	North		13 February 1944	Dispersed 24 February under attack by USS Jack and Grayback
Hi-41	South	1 February 1944	11 February 1944	
Hi-42	North	28 February 1944	16 February 1944	
Hi-43	South	11 February 1944	3 March 1944	
Hi-44				Did not sail
Hi-45	South	16 February 1944	27 February 1944	
Hi-46				Did not sail
Hi-47	South	21 February 1944	5 March 1944	Attacked by USS Bluefish on 4 March
Hi-48	North	25 March 1944	11 March 1944	Attacked by USS Lapon on 18 March
Hi-49	South	23 February 1944	11 March 1944	
Hi-50	North	8 April 1944	15 March 1944	
Hi-51				Did not sail
Hi-52				Did not sail
Hi-53	South	8 March 1944	18 March 1944	
Hi-54	North		29 March 1944	Merged with Hi-56
Hi-55	South	19 March 1944	3 April 1944	Attacked by USS Hake on 2 April
Hi-56	North	24 April 1944	8 April 1944	Merged with Hi-54
Hi-57	South	3 April 1944	16 April 1944	1 April departure delayed by storm
Hi-58	North	3 May 1944	21 April 1944	Submarine USS Robalo seen by aircraft from Japanese aircraft carrier Kaiyō and damaged by convoy escort 24 April 1944
Hi-59	South	20 April 1944		Terminated 2 May 1944 at Manila
Hi-60				Did not sail
Hi-61	South	3 May 1944	18 May 1944	
Hi-62	North	8 June 1944	23 May 1944	
Hi-63	South	13 May 1944	27 May 1944	Attacked by USS Raton on 24 May
Hi-64	North	15 June 1944	6 June 1944	
Hi-65	South	29 May 1944	12 June 1944	Attacked by USS Guitarro and Picuda on 2 June
Hi-66	North	26 June 1944	17 June 1944	
Hi-67	South	22 June 1944	9 July 1944	Attacked by USS Bang on 29 June
Hi-68	North	3 August 1944	14 July 1944	Attacked by USS Angler, Flasher and Crevalle on 26 July
Hi-69	South	13 July 1944	31 July 1944	
Hi-70	North	4 August 1944	15 August 1944	
Hi-71	South	8 August 1944	1 September 1944	Attacked by USS Rasher, Spadefish, Redfish, Bluefish, Haddo and Harder
Hi-72	North	28 September 1944	6 September 1944	Attacked by USS Growler, Pampanito and Sealion on 12 September
Hi-73	South	25 August 1944	5 September 1944	
Hi-74	North	23 September 1944	11 September 1944	Attacked by USS Barb on 16 September
Hi-75	South	8 September 1944	22 September 1944	Attacked by USS Flasher on 18 September
Hi-76	North	26 October 1944	2 October 1944	Hi-76A departed Singapore 12 October
Hi-77	South	1 October 1944	12 October 1944	Attacked by USS Whale, Seahorse, Hawkbill and Baya on 6 and 7 October
Hi-78	North	2 November 1944	20 October 1944	
Hi-79	South	26 October 1944	9 November 1944	Subsidiary Hi-79A formed on 6 November 1944
Hi-80	North	2 December 1944	17 November 1944	
Hi-81	South	14 November 1944	4 December 1944	Attacked by USS Queenfish, Picuda and Spadefish on 15 and 17 November
Hi-82	North	9 January 1945	12 December 1944	Attacked by USS Flasher on 22 December
Hi-83	South	25 November 1944	13 December 1944	Attacked by USS Pipefish on 3 December
Hi-84	North	13 January 1945	26 December 1944	
Hi-85	South	19 December 1944		Terminated 4 January 1945 at Cape Saint Jacques
Hi-86	North	10 February 1945		Originated 9 January 1945 at Cape Saint Jacques; attacked by Task Force 38 on 12 January
Hi-87	South	31 December 1944	23 January 1945	Attacked by Task Force 38 on 16 January
Hi-88	North	March 1945	20 January 1945 to 18 March 1945	Sailed as ten independent small convoys; Hi-88H attacked by USS Hammerhead on 23 February, and Hi-88I by USS Blenny and Baya on 20 and 21 March
Hi-89	South	24 January 1945	8 February 1945	
Hi-90	North	4 March 1945	15 February 1945	
Hi-91	South	26 January 1945	8 February 1945	
Hi-92	North	11 March 1945	18 February 1945	Attacked by USS Hoe on 25 February
Hi-93	South	29 January 1945	12 February 1945	
Hi-94	North	14 March 1945	23 February 1945	
Hi-95	South	31 January 1945	14 February 1945	
Hi-96	North	22 February 1945	13 March 1945	Attacked by USS Blenny on 27 February
Hi-97	South	7 February 1945	15 February 1945	
Hi-98	North		27 February 1945	Single ship convoy Ryoei Maru sunk by USS Bashaw

== Sources ==
- Blair, Clay (1975). Silent Victory. New York: J.B. Lippincott Company. ISBN 9780397007530.
- Cressman, Robert J. (2000). The Official Chronology of the U.S. Navy in World War II. Washington, D.C.: Naval Institute Press. ISBN 1-55750-149-1.
