= Tsukushi-class survey ship =

Imperial Japanese Navy ship class

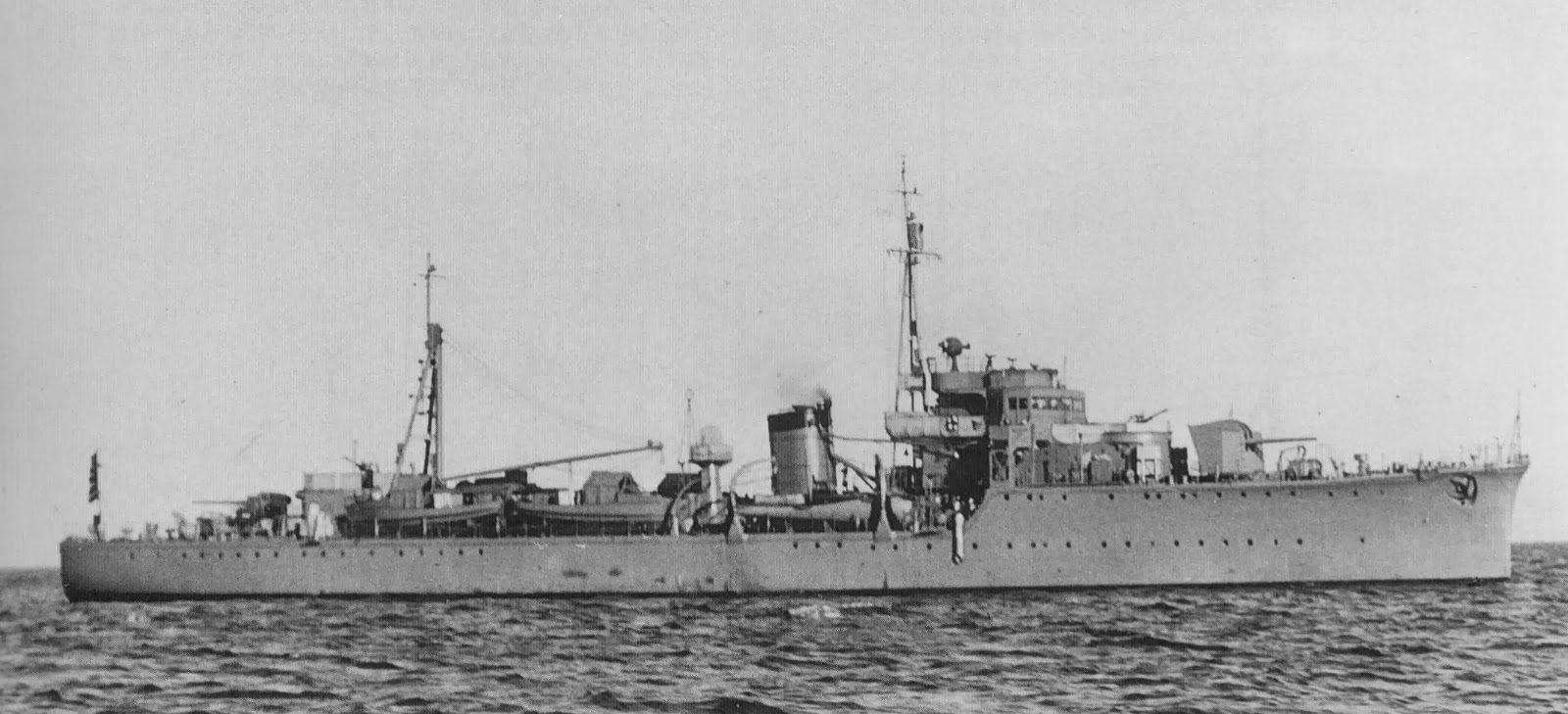
- Tsukushi in December 1941

Class overview
- Name: Tsukushi-class survey ship
- Builders: Mitsubishi Heavy Industries
- Operators: Imperial Japanese Navy
- Preceded by: Yamato-class; Katsuriki
- Subclasses: Tsukushi class (Pr. J11); Miho class (Pr. J11C, only a project)
- Cost: 4,035,745 JPY as Tsukushi; 7,536,000 JPY as Miho
- Built: 1940–1941
- In commission: 1941–1943
- Planned: 2
- Completed: 1
- Canceled: 1
- Lost: 1

General characteristics
- Type: Survey ship
- Displacement: 1,400 long tons (1,422 t) standard
- Length: 79.30 m (260 ft 2 in) overall
- Beam: 10.60 m (34 ft 9 in)
- Draught: 3.65 m (12 ft 0 in)
- Propulsion: 3 × MAN Mk.3 Model 10 diesels, 3 shafts, 5,700 bhp; 2 × Kampon Ho-Gō boilers
- Speed: 19.7 knots (22.7 mph; 36.5 km/h)
- Range: 8,000 nmi (15,000 km) at 16 kn (18 mph; 30 km/h)
- Endurance: Fuel: 255 tons oil
- Boats & landing craft carried: 4 × 10 m (32 ft 10 in) surveying launches
- Complement: 128 officers and men; 65 surveying engineers and weather observers
- Sensors & processing systems: surveying device: 1 × Fessenden echo sounder; 2 × Sigsbee fathometers; 1 × Type 91 fathometer; 2 × electric fathometers
- Armament: 4 × 120 mm (4.7 in) L/45 AA guns; 4 × Type 96 25 mm AA guns
- Aircraft carried: 1 × Yokosuka E14Y
- Aviation facilities: 4 ton derrick

The Tsukushi-class survey ship (筑紫型測量艦,, Tsukushi-gata sokuryōkan) was a class of auxiliary ships of the Imperial Japanese Navy (IJN), serving during World War II. The class consists of two subclasses, which this article handles collectively.

== Background ==
Since the Meiji period, the Imperial Japanese Navy has carried out hydrographic survey with old naval vessels. While sufficient for routine peacetime survey duties, these obsolete vessels were deemed too slow for service in combat zones. Furthermore, these vessels were essentially fighting ships, and thus were not able to carry many surveying devices. Therefore, in the 1920s and the 1930s, many of these ships were retired. The IJN then allotted Katsuriki and Komahashi to survey duties; however, these ships were of merchant ship designs, and were still too slow for the IJN. It then became clear that the IJN required purpose-built ships for hydrographic survey duties.

In 1930, the IJN proposed two 1,600-ton survey ships (Project Number J6) to the Ministry of Finance, but were unable to pass assessments. In 1937, IJN was finally able to get a building budget for one 1,400-ton survey ship. This is Project Number J11, later named Tsukushi.

== Design ==
IJN gave her armament and maneuverability similar to that of Kaibokan several years later, as she was expected to carry out surveys in combat zones. She also possessed a floatplane for aerial survey. Low speed cruising was demanded from her for survey works; therefore she possessed three shafts, with low speed cruising using only the center shaft. Her minimum cruising speed was 2.2 knots (2.5 mph; 4.1 km/h).

== Service ==
Tsukushi was completed on 17 December 1941, and was assigned to the 3rd Fleet the same day. Between 1 January 1942–March 1942, she went to the front in the Dutch East Indies campaign. On 10 March, she was assigned to the 2nd Southern Expeditionary Fleet; she carried out survey works off Surabaya, Balikpapan, and Davao until August. She took maintenance in Singapore between 26 August–7 September. On 25 September, she was assigned to the 4th Fleet; she carried out survey works off Gilbert Islands and Jaluit Atoll. She took maintenance in Yokohama between 27 March 1943–May.

On 20 May 1943, she was assigned to the 8th Fleet, and sailed to Rabaul on 6 June. Afterward, she served in the Solomon Islands. On 3 November, she departed from Rabaul to rescue the Tei-4 Convoy. However she entered a minefield off Kavieng; she struck a magnetic mine and sank on 4 November. She was removed from the naval ship list on 5 January 1944.

A second ship of the class, Miho, was canceled on 5 May 1944.

== Ships in classes ==
=== Tsukushi class ===
- Project number J11. Only one vessel was built under the Maru 3 Programme.

Ship #	Ship	Builder	Laid down	Launched	Completed	Fate
56	Tsukushi (筑紫)	Mitsubishi, Yokohama Shipyard	17 January 1940	29 November 1940	17 December 1941	Struck a magnetic mine and sunk off Kavieng on 4 November 1943.

=== Miho class ===
- Project number J11C. Only one vessel was planned under the Kai-Maru 5 Programme, however, she became only a paper plan.

Ship #	Ship	Builder	Laid down	Launched	Completed	Fate
5418	Miho (三保)					Canceled on 5 May 1944.

== Bibliography ==
- Ships of the World special issue Vol.47 Auxiliary Vessels of the Imperial Japanese Navy, Kaijinsha, (Japan), March 1997
- The Maru Special, Japanese Naval Vessels No.34, Japanese Auxiliary ships, Ushio Shobō (Japan), December 1979
- Senshi Sōsho Vol.31, Naval armaments and war preparation (1), "Until November 1941", Asagumo Simbun (Japan), November 1969
- Senshi Sōsho Vol.88, Naval armaments and war preparation (2), "And after the outbreak of war", Asagumo Simbun (Japan), October 1975
- "The Society of Naval Architects of Japan". (SNAJ), Histories of shipbuilding in Shōwa period (1), "Hara Shobō". (Japan), September 1977
