= Teiyō Maru (1931) =

Imperial Japanese Navy fleet oiler

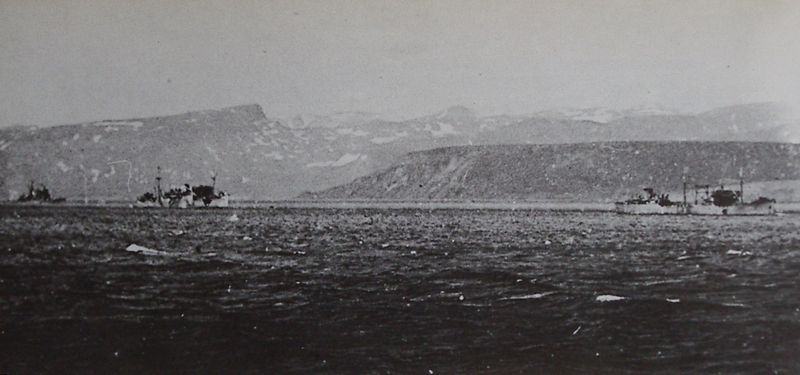
- Teiyō Maru (right) off Paramushiro, 1943.

History

Empire of Japan
- Name: Teiyō Maru
- Builder: Yokohama Dock Company
- Laid down: 28 April 1930
- Launched: 19 January 1931
- Completed: 2 May 1931
- Fate: Sunk 19 August 1944

General characteristics
- Type: Replenishment oiler
- Tonnage: 9,849 GRT
- Length: 512 ft (156 m)
- Beam: 64 ft (20 m)
- Draught: 28.9 ft (8.8 m)
- Propulsion: 1 × Kawasaki Heavy Industries (MAN-type) diesel engine, 7,200 shp
- Speed: 17.5 knots (32.4 km/h; 20.1 mph)
- Capacity: 12,312 tons for heavy crude oil

Teiyō Maru (帝洋丸) was an auxiliary fleet oiler of the Imperial Japanese Navy (IJN) during World War II. She was converted from civilian service to a naval auxiliary as the Pearl Harbor attack force sailed; and participated in the major offensive operations of the first six months of Pacific combat. She then served in the northern Pacific until July 1944 and was sunk in the battle for convoy Hi-71 when reassigned to the defense of the Philippines.

== History ==
Teiyō Maru was completed as a civilian tanker in 1931 and requisitioned by the Navy as a replenishment oiler on 22 November 1941. Yokohama Dock Company completed the conversion to a naval auxiliary on 4 December 1941.

Teiyō Maru served with replenishment group no. 1 for the Java Invasion Force, and later with replenishment group no. 2 for the Indian Ocean raid, and with the 5th Fleet for the Japanese occupation of Attu and Kiska. Teiyō Maru was then converted for cold weather operations and served for two years as a replenishment oiler for ships between Hokkaido and the Aleutian Islands.

On 30 July 1944 Teiyō Maru was attached to convoy Hi-71 carrying Operation Shō reinforcements to the Philippines. The convoy sailed into the South China Sea from Mako naval base in the Pescadores on 17 August, and was discovered that evening by USS Redfish. Redfish assembled USS Rasher, Bluefish and Spadefish for a radar-assisted wolfpack attack in typhoon conditions on the night of 18/19 August. Teiyō Maru was one of several ships torpedoed that night; and 41 crewmen and 58 passengers perished when she sank at 18°09′N 120°13′E.
