= Japanese submarine I-55 (1925) =

Imperial Japanese Navy Kaidai-class cruiser submarine of the KD3A sub-class

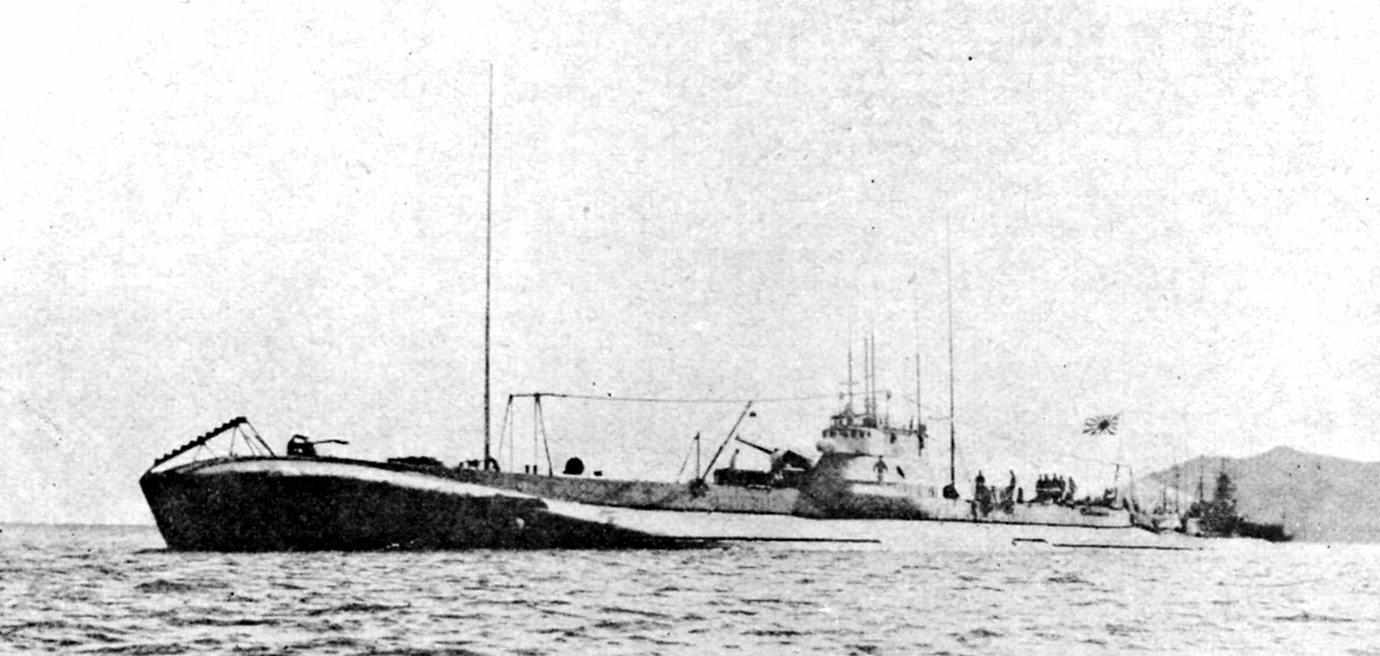
- I-55 in harbor in 1930.

History

Empire of Japan
- Name: Submarine No. 78
- Builder: Kure Naval Arsenal, Kure, Japan
- Laid down: 1 April 1924
- Renamed: I-55 on 1 November 1924
- Launched: 2 September 1925
- Completed: 5 September 1927
- Commissioned: 5 September 1927
- Decommissioned: 10 February 1932 (possibly; see text)
- Recommissioned: 20 February 1934 (possibly; see text)
- Decommissioned: 31 July 1936
- Recommissioned: 1 December 1936
- Renamed: I-155 on 20 May 1942
- Decommissioned: 20 July 1945
- Recommissioned: early August 1945
- Fate: Surrendered September 1945; Stricken 20 November 1945; Scuttled 8 May 1946

General characteristics
- Class & type: Kaidai-class submarine (KD3A Type)
- Displacement: 1,829 t (1,800 long tons) surfaced; 2,337 t (2,300 long tons) submerged
- Length: 100 m (328 ft 1 in)
- Beam: 8 m (26 ft 3 in)
- Draft: 4.82 m (15 ft 10 in)
- Installed power: 6,800 bhp (5,100 kW) (diesels); 1,800 hp (1,300 kW) (electric motors)
- Propulsion: Diesel-electric; 2 × diesel engines; 2 × electric motors
- Speed: 20 knots (37 km/h; 23 mph) surfaced; 8 knots (15 km/h; 9.2 mph) submerged
- Range: 10,000 nmi (19,000 km; 12,000 mi) at 10 knots (19 km/h; 12 mph) surfaced; 90 nmi (170 km; 100 mi) at 3 knots (5.6 km/h; 3.5 mph) submerged
- Test depth: 60 m (197 ft)
- Complement: 60
- Armament: 8 × 533 mm (21 in) torpedo tubes (6 bow, 2 stern); 1 × 120 mm (4.7 in) deck gun (removed April 1945); 2 x kaiten (added April 1945)

I-55, later renumbered I-155 (伊号第五五潜水艦, I-gō Dai-Hyaku-gojūgosensuikan), was an Imperial Japanese Navy Kaidai-class cruiser submarine of the KD3A sub-class commissioned in 1927. Early in World War II, she supported Japanese forces in the invasion of Malaya and the Dutch East Indies campaign before assuming training duties in Japan, interrupted briefly in 1943 by her participation in the Aleutian Islands campaign. She became a kaiten manned suicide attack torpedo carrier in 1945 before surrendering at the end of the war. She was scuttled in 1946.

== Background ==
Following World War I, the Imperial Japanese Navy re-evaluated the use of submarine warfare as an element of fleet strategy due to the successful deployment of long-range cruiser submarines for commerce raiding by the Imperial German Navy. Japanese strategists came to realize possibilities for using submarines for long-range reconnaissance and in a war of attrition against an enemy fleet approaching Japan. The Japanese already had built two large, long-range submarines — I-51 and I-52 — under the Eight-six fleet program as prototypes, but the arrival on 20 June 1919 of seven German U-boats Japan received as war reparations after the end of World War I led to a complete re-design. The Japanese quickly hired hundreds of German submarine engineers, technicians, and former U-boat officers unemployed after the defeat of the German Empire in World War I and brought them to Japan under five-year contracts. The United States Navy′s Office of Naval Intelligence estimated that some 800 German advisors had gone to Japan by the end of 1920. The Japanese also sent delegations to Germany, and were active in purchasing many patents related to submarine design and construction.

== Design ==
The four Kaidai Type 3A submarines were the first mass-produced Japanese fleet submarines. Based largely on the lone Kaidai Type II submarine (I-52), their design was also influenced by the largest of the German submarines in Japanese hands, SM U-125. Compared with I-52, they a strengthened double hull. The hull had almost the same outer dimensions as that of I-52, but the increased thickness of the inner hull permitted a diving depth of 60 meters (197 ft). The internal volume was slightly increased over that of I-52 by making the hull slightly trapezoidal in cross-section at the expense of 300 tons of additional displacement. External differences from I-52 included an anti-submarine net cutter on the bow, as well as an O-ring for towing purposes.

The Kaidai Type 3A submarines displaced 1,829 metric tons (1,800 long tons) surfaced and 2,337 metric tons (2,300 long tons) submerged. The submarines were 100 meters (328 ft 1 in) long and had a beam of 8 meters (26 ft 3 in) and a draft of 4.82 meters (15 ft 10 in). They had a complement of 60 officers and crewmen.

Sulzer was retained as the manufacturer for the diesel engines, which had a slightly improved performance over the engines in I-52. For surface running, the submarines were powered by two 3,400-brake-horsepower (2,535 kW) diesel engines, each driving one propeller shaft. When submerged, each propeller was driven by a 900-horsepower (671 kW) electric motor. The submarines could reach 20 knots (37 km/h; 23 mph) on the surface and 8 knots (15 km/h; 9.2 mph) submerged. On the surface, the KD3As had a range of 10,000 nautical miles (19,000 km; 12,000 mi) at 10 knots (19 km/h; 12 mph); submerged, they had a range of 90 nmi (170 km; 100 mi) at 3 knots (5.6 km/h; 3.5 mph).

The submarines had eight internal 53.3 cm (21.0 in) torpedo tubes, six in the bow and two in the stern. They carried one reload for each tube for a total of 16 torpedoes. They were had one 120 mm (4.7 in) deck gun.

== Construction and commissioning ==
Built by the Kure Naval Arsenal, I-55 was laid down on 1 April 1924 as Submarine No.78 (第七十八号潜水艦, Dai-nanajuhachi-gō sensuikan). While under construction, she was renamed I-55 on 1 November 1924. She was launched on 2 September 1925 and completed and commissioned on 5 September 1927.

== Service history ==
=== Pre-World War II ===
On the day she was commissioned, I-55 was assigned to the Kure Naval District and assigned to Submarine Division 18 in Submarine Squadron 2 in the 2nd Fleet, a component of the Combined Fleet. During a training exercise on 11 July 1929 in which she simulated a submerged torpedo attack against the heavy cruiser Kinugasa, she accidentally collided with Kinugasa off Kyushu 20 nautical miles (37 km; 23 mi) southwest of Ōdate Shima lighthouse, sustaining substantial damage to her bow plating. On 1 December 1930, Submarine Division 18 was reassigned to the Kure Defense Squadron in the Kure Naval District.

Submarine Division 18 began a second assignment to Submarine Squadron 2 in the 2nd Fleet on 1 December 1931. At 13:48 on 10 February 1932, I-55′s sister ship I-54 suffered a steering failure off Kyushu 20 nautical miles (37 km; 23 mi) south of Odate Shima lighthouse while Submarine Division 18 was on maneuvers during fleet exercises. I-54 reduced speed to 3 knots (5.6 km/h; 3.5 mph), but nonetheless accidentally rammed I-55. I-54 suffered bow damage and one of her compartments flooded, but I-55 sustained only minor damage.

Between February 1932 and February 1934, Submarine Division 18 was active, concluding duty in Submarine Squadron 2 in the 2nd Fleet with its reassignment to the Kure Defense Division in the Kure Naval District on 15 November 1933 and then to the Kure Defense Squadron in the Kure Naval District on 11 December 1933 before it began a third tour of duty in Submarine Squadron 2 in the 2nd Fleet on 1 February 1934. I-55′s activities during this period are unclear: She may have been in reserve from the day of her collision with I-54 on 10 February 1932 until 20 February 1934, or she may have remained active in her division. In the latter case, she got underway from Sasebo on 29 June 1933 with the other submarines of her squadron (I-53 and I-54 of her division and Submarine Division 19's I-56, I-57 and I-58) for a training cruise off China and Mako in the Pescadores Islands, which the submarines concluded with their arrival at Takao, Formosa, on 5 July 1933; departing Takao on 13 July 1933 with the other five submarines and again training in Chinese waters before arriving in Tokyo Bay on 21 August 1933; and taking part with the other five submarines in a fleet review at Yokohama, Japan, on 25 August 1933. Submarine Division 18 was reassigned to the Kure Defense Division in the Kure Naval District on 15 November 1933 and then to the Kure Defense Squadron in the Kure Naval District on 11 December 1933 before it began a third tour of duty in Submarine Squadron 2 in the 2nd Fleet on 1 February 1934.

On 7 February 1935 I-55 got underway from Sasebo along with the other eight submarines of Submarine Squadron 2 — I-53, I-54, I-59, I-60, I-61, I-62, I-63, and I-64 — for a training cruise in the Kuril Islands. The cruise concluded with their arrival at Sukumo Bay on 25 February 1935. The nine submarines departed Sasebo on 29 March 1935 to train in Chinese waters, returning to Sasebo on 4 April 1935.

Submarine Division 18 was reassigned to Submarine Squadron 1 in the 1st Fleet, a component of the Combined Fleet, on 15 November 1935. While the division was on maneuvers during fleet exercises off Kyushu on 10 May 1936, I-55 collided with her sister ship I-53, sustaining minor damage to her bow plating. On 23 July 1936 I-55 suffered more extensive damage when the Combined Fleet was caught in a typhoon off Beppu, Kyushu, during fleet exercises and she ran aground in Terajima Channel, suffering severe damage to her hull plating. After her superstructure was partially dismantled, she was refloated and towed to Kure, Japan, on 31 July 1936, where she was drydocked for repairs. She was placed in reserve that day. All of Submarine Division 18 followed her into reserve at Kure on 20 August 1936.

Submarine Division 18 returned to active service on 1 October 1936, when it began another tour of duty in Submarine Squadron 1 in the 1st Fleet, and I-55 returned to active service in the division on 1 December 1936. The division was reassigned to Submarine Squadron 4 in the 1st Fleet on 15 November 1939. On 11 October 1940, I-55 was one of 98 Imperial Japanese Navy ships that gathered along with more than 500 aircraft on the Japanese coast at Yokohama Bay for an Imperial fleet review — the largest fleet review in Japanese history — in honor of the 2,600th anniversary of the enthronement of the Emperor Jimmu, Japan's legendary first emperor. Submarine Squadron 4 was assigned directly to the Combined Fleet on 15 November 1940.

As the Japanese armed forces mobilized for an offensive against Allied forces that would begin the Pacific campaign of World War II, I-53, I-54, and I-55 departed Kure, Japan, on 20 November 1941 bound for Samah on China's Hainan Island, which they reached on 26 November 1941. All three submarines departed Samah on 1 December 1941 to take up positions to support the offensive. Tasked with supporting Operation E, the Japanese invasion of British Malaya, I-55 formed a patrol line in the South China Sea east of Kuantan, British Malaya, with I-53 and I-54 on 7 December 1941.

=== World War II ===
==== First war patrol ====
Hostilities began in East Asia on 8 December 1941 (7 December across the International Date Line in Hawaii, where Japan began the war with its attack on Pearl Harbor), and on 9 and 10 December I-55 participated in attempts to intercept Force Z, a British Royal Navy task force centered around the battleship HMS Prince of Wales and battlecruiser HMS Repulse, before it could threaten Japanese invasion convoys. Imperial Japanese Navy torpedo planes sank the two capital ships in the South China Sea off the Malayan Peninsula on 10 December 1941 before the submarines could engage them.

Early on the morning of 14 December 1941, the Dutch submarine HNLMS K XII detected faint propeller noises, apparently those of a Japanese submarine, and at 11:00 sighted a periscope to starboard. K XII steered to ram the Japanese submarine and had closed to 100 meters (109 yd) of where lookouts had last seen the periscope when the periscope reappeared to port. K XII abandoned the ramming attempt and broke contact by zigzagging away. The submarine she attempted to ram probably was I-54, I-55, or I-56. I-55 concluded her patrol with her arrival at Cam Ranh Bay in Japanese-occupied French Indochina on 20 December 1941.

==== Second war patrol ====
I-55 departed Cam Ranh Bay on 29 December 1941 to begin her second war patrol. She patrolled the Bangka Strait off Sumatra without incident and returned to Cam Ranh Bay on 14 January 1942.

==== Third war patrol ====
I-55 departed Cam Ranh Bay for her third war patrol on 31 January 1942, assigned a patrol area at the southern entrance to Lombok Strait between Bali and Lombok as a part of the A Group. After refueling at an advance base in the Anambas Islands on 2 February 1942, she proceeded to her patrol area. I-55 often is credited with sinking the Dutch 1,937-gross register ton steamer SS Van Lansberge on 4 February 1942, but Van Lansberge actually was sunk in an air attack.

After the Japanese submarine Ro-34 expended all of her torpedoes in an attack on an Allied convoy, I-53, I-54, and I-55 received orders on 5 February 1942 to patrol in Ro-34ʼs area. On 7 February 1942, I-55 encountered the 4,519-gross register ton Dutch passenger ship Van Cloon in the Java Sea at 06°18′S 111°36′E and engaged her with gunfire, forcing her to beach herself on the south shore of Bawean Island in a sinking condition. The United States Navy patrol vessel USS Isabel (PY-10) arrived on the scene, rescued 187 people from Van Cloon, and opened fire on I-55 when I-55 attempted to surface nearby. I-55 dived and later was attacked by an Allied PBY Catalina flying boat.

Japanese forces invaded Sumatra and Java on 8 February 1942, and at 21:02 on the evening of 13 February I-55 hit the British 4,799-gross register ton armed steamer SS Derrymore with two torpedoes in the Java Sea. Derrymore, which was on a voyage from Singapore to Batavia, Java, with a 7,000-ton cargo of military stores including ammunition and six crated Hawker Hurricane Mark II fighters and carrying 209 Royal Australian Air Force (RAAF) personnel, sank 90 minutes later about 5 nautical miles (9.3 km; 5.8 mi) north of Jason Rock and 12 nautical miles (22 km; 14 mi) southwest of Noordwachter Island in the Thousand Islands at 05°18′S 106°20′E with the loss of nine RAAF personnel. The Royal Australian Navy corvette HMAS Ballarat quickly rescued Derrymore′s entire crew of 36 (including four gunners) and the other 200 RAAF personnel aboard.

On 17 February 1942, I-55 and I-56 received orders to proceed to Staring Bay on the coast of Celebes. On 18 February 1942, I-55 reported sinking an Allied merchant ship with gunfire, although her likely target, the 5,804-gross register ton Norwegian tanker SS Madrono, actually suffered no damage. I-55 ended her patrol with her arrival at Staring Bay on 21 February 1942.

=== March 1942–May 1943 ===
Submarine Squadron 4 was disbanded on 10 March 1942, and Submarine Division 18 was reassigned to the Kure Naval District and ordered back to Japanese home waters. I-53, I-54, and I-55 departed Staring Bay on 16 March and arrived at Kure, Japan, on 25 March 1942, where they assumed duties as training ships. I-55 was renumbered I-155 (伊号第五五潜水艦, I-gō Dai-Hyaku-gojūgo sensuikan) on 20 May 1942. Sources differ on whether she remained assigned to Submarine Division 18 throughout this period and until 31 January 1944; some claim she was assigned to the Kure Guard Unit in the Kure Naval District on 10 March 1942 and did not return to Submarine Division 18 in the Kure Naval District until 1 April 1943, then was reassigned to Submarine Division 33 in the Kure Submarine Squadron in the Kure Naval District on 20 April 1943.

=== Aleutian Islands campaign ===
After her return to Japan, I-155ʼs operations were uneventful until 21 May 1943, when the Japanese Imperial General Headquarters decided to bring the Aleutian Islands campaign to and end by evacuating Japanese forces from Kiska in the Aleutian Islands. Ordered to participate in the evacuation, I-155 departed Kure on 22 May 1943, called at Yokosuka, Japan, on 23 May, and then proceeded to Paramushiro in the northern Kuril Islands, being attached temporarily to the Kiska Evacuation Force as a unit of Submarine Squadron 1 in the Northern District Force of the 5th Fleet on 29 May 1943 along with the submarines I-2, I-7, I-21, I-24, I-34, I-36, I-156, I-157, I-168, I-169, and I-171. She arrived at Paramushiro on 2 June 1943, and departed on 4 June carrying supplies for the forces in Kiska, but suffered damage in heavy seas and was forced to return to Paramushiro, which she reached on 7 June 1943. On 14 June she departed Paramushiro and headed for Kure for repairs. She arrived at Kure on 20 June 1943.

=== June 1943–April 1945 ===
After returning to Kure from her abortive Aleutians service and completing repairs, I-155 resumed duties as a training ship. Sources provide a confusing depiction of her assignment history; some assert that she was assigned to Submarine Division 18 in the Kure Naval District continually until 31 January 1944 and that the division was assigned to the Kure Submarine Squadron in the Kure Naval District on 1 December 1943, while others claim that she was reassigned as part of Submarine Division 33 to the Kure Guard Unit in the Kure Naval District on 28 July 1943 and then to Submarine Division 18 in the Kure Submarine Squadron on 1 December 1943. On 5 January 1944, she took part in tests of a new submarine camouflage pattern in the Iyo Nada in the Seto Inland Sea for the Submarine School, painted in a light gray scheme based on that of the German submarine U-511, which the Imperial Japanese Navy had purchased from Germany in 1943 and renamed Ro-500.

On 31 January 1944, I-155 was reassigned to Submarine Division 19 of the Kure Submarine Squadron and laid up without a crew. From 23 to 25 February 1944, however, she tested another camouflage scheme for the Naval Submarine School, painted bluish-gray and black. While submerged at 11:50 on 5 May 1944, she suffered damage in a collision with the hybrid oiler-seaplane carrier Hayasui off Kabuto-jima in Hiroshima Bay at longitude 140 degrees East, and garbled Japanese message intercepted, decrypted, and translated by Allied signals intelligence indicated that her damage included a hole measuring 2 by 1 meter (6 ft 7 in by 3 ft 3 in).

=== April 1945–November 1945 ===
On 20 April 1945, I-155 and the submarine I-122 were reassigned to Submarine Division 33 in the Kure Submarine Squadron in the Kure Naval District, and by late April 1945 I-155 had been converted to transport kaiten manned suicide attack torpedoes to bases on Shikoku, with her 120-millimeter (4.7 in) deck gun replaced by fittings for two kaiten. On 20 July 1945, she was placed in reserve and anchored near the Kure Submarine School.

In the final days of the war, I-155 was selected for a kaiten mission. Recommissioned in early August 1945, she was fitted with two kaiten at the naval base at Ōzushima and was scheduled to depart Hirao on 25 August 1945 with the submarine I-156 as part of the Shinshu-tai ("Land of Gods Unit") kaiten group. Although Emperor Hirohito announced the cessation of hostilities on 15 August 1945, I-155 and I-156 put to sea from Hirao for the operation on 25 August 1945. The kaiten mission was cancelled that day and the submarines were recalled. I-155 proceeded to Kure, where she surrendered to the Allies in September 1945. The Japanese removed her from the Navy list on 20 November 1945.

== Disposal ==
I-155 was among 17 captured Japanese submarines sunk by gunfire by the Royal Australian Navy destroyer HMAS Quiberon and the Royal Indian Navy sloop-of-war HMIS Sutlej in the Seto Inland Sea between Honshu and Shikoku on 8 May 1946 in Operation Bottom.
