= Japanese fleet oiler Hayasui =

Aircraft carrier of the Imperial Japanese Navy

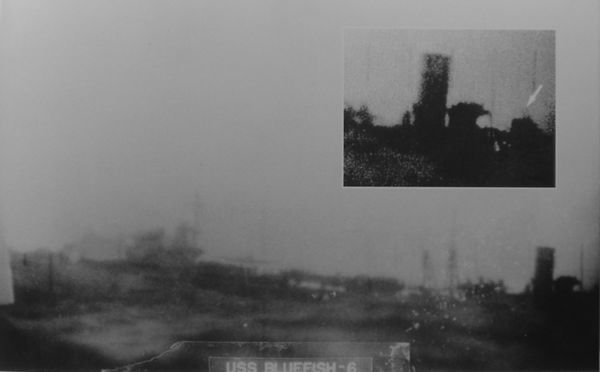
- Hayasui sinking on 19 August 1944

History

Empire of Japan
- Name: Hayasui
- Namesake: Hayasui-no Seto
- Builder: Harima Dock Company
- Laid down: 1 February 1943
- Launched: 25 December 1943
- Completed: 24 April 1944
- Decommissioned: 10 October 1944
- Fate: Torpedoed and sunk, 19 August 1944

General characteristics
- Class & type: Hayasui
- Type: fleet oiler
- Displacement: 18,300 long tons (18,594 t) standard
- Length: 161.00 m (528 ft 3 in) overall
- Beam: 20.10 m (65 ft 11 in)
- Draught: 8.83 m (29 ft 0 in)
- Propulsion: 1 × Ishikawajima geared turbine; 2 × Kampon Mk.21 simple boilers; single shaft, 9,500 shp (7,100 kW)
- Speed: 16.5 knots (30.6 km/h; 19.0 mph)
- Range: 9,000 nmi (17,000 km) at 16 knots (30 km/h; 18 mph)
- Capacity: 9,800 tons for heavy crude oil; 200 tons for gasoline; 750 tons for fresh water; Fresh vegetables for 2 weeks × 2,800 men; Foods for 30 days × 1,100 men
- Complement: 301
- Armament: 4 × 127 mm (5 in) L/40 AA guns; 8 × Type 96 25mm AA guns
- Aircraft carried: 6 + 1 (E13A or B7A Ryūsei)
- Aviation facilities: catapult and deck

Hayasui (速吸, "Quick Absorption") was a Japanese fleet oiler with aircraft facilities (hybrid tanker/carrier) of the Imperial Japanese Navy (IJN), serving during World War II.

== Construction ==
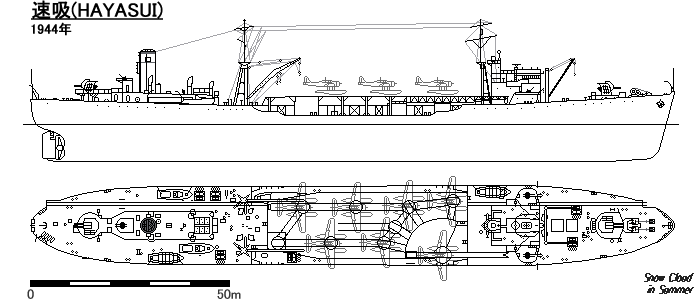
Drawing of Hayasui in 1944 equipped with seven aircraft.

Hayasui was completed as an "improved Kazahaya-class fleet oiler", being therefore the only one of her class. After the lack of reconnaissance planes was identified as a contributing factor to the defeat of the IJN at the Battle of Midway plus the loss of four carriers, aviation facilities were added to Hayasui for accompanying the carrier task force, were six planes could be store on the deck with an additional plane on the launch catapult. Those aircraft could be either Aichi E13A reconnaissance seaplanes, or Aichi B7A Ryūsei torpedo bombers, with the latter unable to land back on her and therefore had to land elsewhere. The Navy later added food supply facilities to the ship to improve the carrier task force's endurance following experience at the Battle of the Santa Cruz Islands.

== Service ==
The ship was completed on 24 April 1944. In May Hayasui sailed to Tawi-Tawi for Operation A. On 5 May the ship collided with the submerged submarine I-155. From 19 to 20 June 1944 Hayasui participated in the Battle of the Philippine Sea and was damaged. On 10 August, repairs were completed for convoy Hi-71 departure from Moji to Singapore.

At 03:20 on 19 August Hayasui was torpedoed twice by USS Bluefish west of Vigan City. At about 05:00 the ship suffered an explosion and sank at 17°34′N 119°24′E. On 10 October the ship was struck from the navy list
