= Japanese survey ship Katsuriki =

Japanese naval vessel (1916–1944)

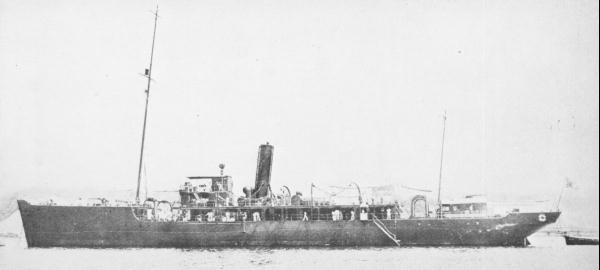
- Katsuriki Maru in the Taisho era

History

Japan
- Name: Katsuriki
- Ordered: fiscal 1915
- Builder: Kure Naval Arsenal
- Laid down: 15 May 1916
- Launched: 5 October 1916
- Completed: 15 January 1917
- Decommissioned: struck 10 November 1944
- Renamed: Katsuriki Maru as built; Katsuriki on 1 April 1920
- Reclassified: Miscellaneous service ship as built; Minelayer on 1 April 1920; Survey ship on 20 July 1942
- Fate: Sunk, 21 September 1944

General characteristics
- Type: Minelayer/Survey ship
- Displacement: 1,540 long tons (1,565 t) standard
- Length: 73.15 m (240.0 ft) waterline
- Beam: 11.91 m (39 ft 1 in)
- Draught: 4.27 m (14 ft 0 in)
- Propulsion: 2 × Kampon water-tube boilers, 2 × three expansion stages reciprocating engines, 2 shafts, 1,800 hp (1,300 kW)
- Speed: 13 knots (15 mph; 24 km/h)
- Endurance: Fuel: 449 tons coal
- Complement: 138
- Armament: as built; 3 × Armstrong 3 in L/40 guns; 100 × Mk.5 naval mines; in 1935; 3 × 76.2 mm (3.00 in) L/40 AA guns

Katsuriki (勝力) was a minelayer (later converted to a survey ship) of the Imperial Japanese Navy (IJN) serving during World War I and World War II, the only ship of her class. She was the first purpose-built ocean-minelayer in the Japanese Navy.

== Background ==
In 1914, with the start of World War I, the Empire of Japan joined the Allies as part of its obligations under the Anglo-Japanese Alliance. However, the Imperial Japanese Navy did not possess an ocean minelayer to protect its harbors from the threat of the Imperial German Navy, only several small boats which had been remodeled to carry naval mines. In 1915, a rush order was placed for a purpose-built ocean-minelayer, with the costs to be covered under the Eight-six Fleet program as part of the Muroto-class colliers. As there was not much time for the Imperial Japanese Navy Technical Department to develop the design, the basic configuration of Katsuriki was based on that of a standard merchant ship, which was even reflected in her original name of Katsuriki Maru (勝力丸).

Katsuriki was laid down at Kure Naval Arsenal on 15 May 1916, launched on 5 October 1916 and completed on 15 January 1917.

== Service history ==
=== World War I and the Interwar period ===
Katsuriki Maru was completed in time for the final stages of World War I, when the threat of German attack on Japanese harbors was negligible. She was retained around the Japanese home islands for the duration of the war.

On 1 April 1920, she was classified as a utility vessel and renamed Katsuriki. In the 1920s, she served on occasion as a guard ship around various islands in Japan's recently acquired South Seas Mandate and carried out maritime surveying duties.

On 1 July 1935, the remaining minelaying equipment was removed, and surveying devices from the retired survey ship Manshū were installed; she was officially reclassified as a survey vessel. During the Second Sino-Japanese War from 1937, she undertook many survey missions along the coast of China. In 1938, she was known to have surveyed the Spratly Islands, claimed by French Indochina at the time. She was also part of the IJN 5th Fleet during the invasion of Hainan from 9–11 February 1939. From October 1941, she was deployed to Kwajalein in the Marshall Islands and surveyed the vicinity of Tarawa in the Gilbert Islands.

=== Pacific War ===
With the start of World War II, Katsuriki was re-designated as a “secret military vessel” on 20 July 1942, although her mission remained that of maritime surveying. She was sent to map the coasts of the Strait of Malacca, Indian Ocean, Burma, Singapore, the Dutch East Indies and the north coast of New Guinea in support of Japanese troop landings and combat operations.

On 21 September 1944, she was hit by two torpedoes fired by USS Haddo 80 nautical miles (150 km) southwest of Manila, at 13°35′N 119°06′E and sank. Lookouts on USS Haddo spotted about 40 survivors in the water and attempted to rescue them, but the Japanese drowned themselves. On 10 November 1944, Katsuriki was removed from the Navy List.
