= USS Haddo (SS-255) =

Submarine of the United States

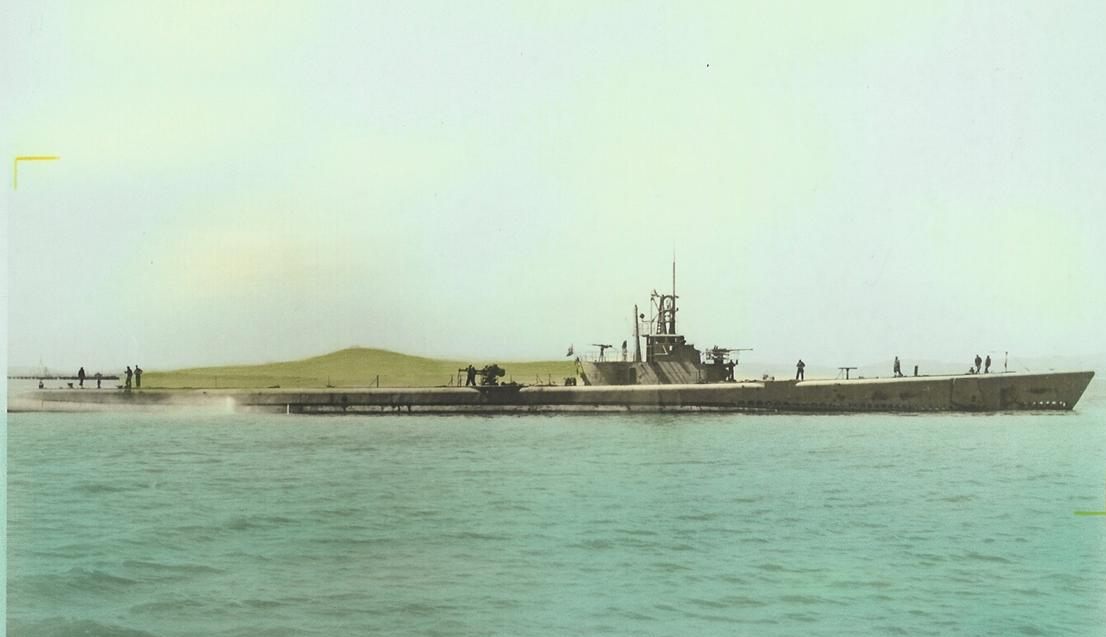
- Haddo (SS-255), off Mare Island Navy Yard, 10 April 1945.

History

United States
- Builder: Electric Boat Company, Groton, Connecticut
- Laid down: 1 October 1941
- Launched: 21 June 1942
- Sponsored by: Mrs. Charles F. Russell
- Commissioned: 9 October 1942
- Decommissioned: 16 February 1946
- Stricken: 1 August 1958
- Fate: Sold for scrap, 4 May 1959

General characteristics
- Class & type: Gato-class diesel-electric submarine
- Displacement: 1,525 long tons (1,549 t) surfaced; 2,424 long tons (2,463 t) submerged
- Length: 311 ft 9 in (95.02 m)
- Beam: 27 ft 3 in (8.31 m)
- Draft: 17 ft 0 in (5.18 m) maximum
- Propulsion: 4 × Hooven-Owens-Rentschler (H.O.R.) diesel engines driving electrical generators; 2 × 126-cell Sargo batteries; 4 × high-speed General Electric electric motors with reduction gears; two propellers; 5,400 shp (4.0 MW) surfaced; 2,740 shp (2.0 MW) submerged
- Speed: 21 kn (39 km/h) surfaced; 9 kn (17 km/h) submerged
- Range: 11,000 nmi (20,000 km) surfaced at 10 kn (19 km/h)
- Endurance: 48 hours at 2 kn (4 km/h) submerged; 75 days on patrol
- Test depth: 300 ft (90 m)
- Complement: 6 officers, 54 enlisted
- Armament: 10 × 21-inch (533 mm) torpedo tubes; 6 forward, 4 aft; 24 torpedoes; 1 × 3-inch (76 mm) / 50 caliber deck gun; Bofors 40 mm and Oerlikon 20 mm cannon

USS Haddo (SS-255), was a Gato-class submarine and the first ship of the United States Navy to be named for the haddo.

== Construction and commissioning ==
Haddo′s keel was laid down by the Electric Boat Company at Groton, Connecticut. She was launched on 21 June 1942, sponsored by Mrs. Charles F. Russell, and commissioned on 9 October 1942.

== Atlantic war patrols, April – July 1943 ==
After conducting shakedown off New England, Haddo departed New London on 9 April 1943 to patrol the shipping lanes to Rosneath, Scotland. She arrived on 30 April and joined Submarine Squadron 50 (Subron 50), which was assigned to patrol off Norway and Iceland and stand ready in case of a breakthrough of the German fleet from Norway. When it became clear after three patrols that targets were scarce in this region, Haddo and her sister submarines were sent back to the United States.

== Fourth–sixth war patrols, November 1943 – July 1944 ==
Haddo returned to New London on 29 July 1943 and steamed via the Panama Canal to Mare Island, Calif. Assigned to the Pacific Fleet, she reached Pearl Harbor on 25 November and put to sea 14 on December on her fourth war patrol, in Philippine waters. The submarine made few contacts and terminated the patrol on 4 February 1944 at Fremantle, Australia.

Sailing from Fremantle on 29 February, Haddo embarked on her fifth war patrol in waters off Borneo, Java, and Indochina. After a disappointing attack on 8 March in which two torpedo exploded prematurely, she made an attack on a tanker and escort on 14 March which produced unconfirmed results. Moving to the Indochina coast, she sank a small craft with gunfire on the night of 23 March and damaged the freighter Nichian Maru on 29 March before returning to Fremantle on 22 April.

Haddo departed Fremantle on 18 May to conduct her sixth war patrol in the East Indies. After suffering an air attack off Morotai on 30 May, she sighted heavy smoke and proceeded to investigate. The smoke was a lure that concealed a Japanese patrol boat. After evading this one, Haddo encountered six more of the smoking lures. Haddo sank two small craft on 11 June and scouted the Tawi Tawi anchorage on 14 June. Shortly thereafter, she was detected by a patrol airplane and pursued for almost 10 days. Her sixth war patrol was terminated on 16 July at Fremantle.

== Seventh war patrol, August – October 1944 ==
For her seventh war patrol, Haddo joined a coordinated attack group with five other submarines to cruise Philippine waters. Japanese convoys ventured into the Palawan area with strong air cover during the day, but usually anchored with escort protection for the night.

Learning from Harder that a convoy had been attacked by Ray 4 days before and trailed to Paluan Bay, the submarines closed in for the attack. As the convoy headed out to sea before daylight on 21 August 1944, Ray sank one transport while the escort vessels pursued Harder. At this point Haddo entered the fray, launched six torpedoes at three targets, and dived to avoid air attack. Over 100 depth charge churned the sea, but Haddo had already sunk cargo ships Kinryu Maru and Norfolk Maru.

Next day Haddo followed Harder in for an attack on a small convoy with escorts, and Haddo succeeded in sending the escort ship Sado to the bottom. Following a lone destroyer and awaiting her opportunity, Haddo was suddenly turned upon by the Japanese ship. She launched a four-torpedo spread "down the throat" of the destroyer, which veered off and headed for Manila.

Cruising off Cape Bolinao on 23 August, the submarine was about to torpedo a tanker close to shore when she detected a pursuing destroyer. With four torpedoes she ripped off the warship's bow. Haddo then maneuvered to finish off her antagonist, but her last torpedo missed. Despite the efforts of two Japanese trawlers and another destroyer, Asakaze soon sank.

Diverting to New Guinea to refuel and rearm, Haddo continued her seventh war patrol. She sank a sampan on 8 September. On 21 September, she found a convoy and maneuvered into position ahead of it. While turning to avoid a destroyer, Haddo lost depth control, and was not able to regain it in time to effectively attack the cargo ships. She subsequently headed for Subic Bay, on lifeguard duty, but on the way detected the hospital ship Takasago Maru and the survey ship Katsuriki in company. Disregarding the former ship, she sunk the latter.

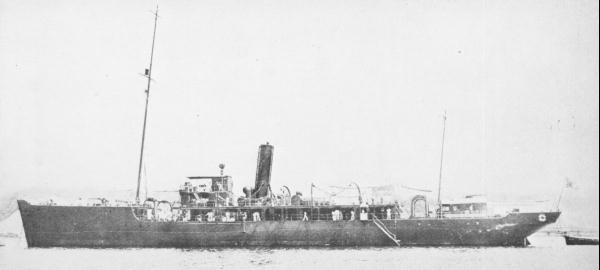
minelayer Katsuriki

On 22 September, while serving on lifeguard station in Subic Bay, Haddo rescued Hollis Hills, a US Navy pilot shot down by anti-aircraft fire. Hills was an American who joined the Royal Canadian Air Force before the United States entered the war, after which he joined the United States Navy. Notably, while flying an RCAF P-51 Mustang over France in 1942, he had become the first P-51 pilot to shoot down an enemy aircraft.

Haddo returned to Fremantle on 3 October. For this outstanding patrol, the submarine received the Navy Unit Commendation.

== Eighth and ninth war patrols, October 1944 – July 1945 ==
Haddo returned to the waters off Manila for her eighth war patrol. Departing Fremantle on 20 October, she sank the oiler Hishi Maru No. 2 on 9 November 1944. Serving as a lifeguard boat for aircraft, she was credited with sinking No. 3 Kyoei Maru on 6 December, (although postwar accounting showed the target was only damaged) before terminating her eighth war patrol at Pearl Harbor on 27 December. From there she was sent to Mare Island shipyard for much-needed repairs, arriving on 5 January 1945.

Haddo departed on her ninth war patrol on 16 May. Cruising the East China and Yellow Sea, she attacked a convoy emerging from the fog on 1 July and quickly sank a small coastal defense vessel (Type D escort ship CD-72) and cargo ship, Taiun Maru No. 1. Clearing the area, she heard automatic gunfire, and soon saw a frigate bearing down hard upon her. Haddo's skipper decided not to dive and instead turned on a parallel but opposite course, and the frigate shot by with her guns blazing. Haddo suffered little damage, and was able to avoid a companion escort and finally reach deep water. That evening she sank two sailing junks and then set course for a new station off Port Arthur. She sank a trawler on 3 July, survived a furious depth charge attack by patrol vessels, and proceeded to Guam, arriving on 16 July.

== Post-war ==
Haddo departed on her tenth and last war patrol on 10 August 1945, but it was soon terminated by the surrender of Japan. She then headed for Tokyo Bay, where she witnessed the signing of the surrender on board the battleship Missouri and departed for home. Touching at Hawaii, Haddo arrived at Panama on 28 September and New London on 6 October. Decommissioned on 16 February 1946, Haddo was kept in reserve until her name was stricken from the Navy List on 1 August 1958. She was sold for scrap on 30 April 1959 to Luria Brothers & Co., Philadelphia, Pa.

In addition to the Navy Unit Commendation, Haddo received six battle stars for her World War II service. Her fifth, seventh, eighth, and ninth war patrols were designated successful.

== Bibliography ==
- Wright, C. C. (2005). "Question 17/03: Replacement of US Submarine Diesel Engines". Warship International. XLII (4): 431–434. ISSN 0043-0374.
