= USS Bluefish (SS-222) =

Submarine of the United States

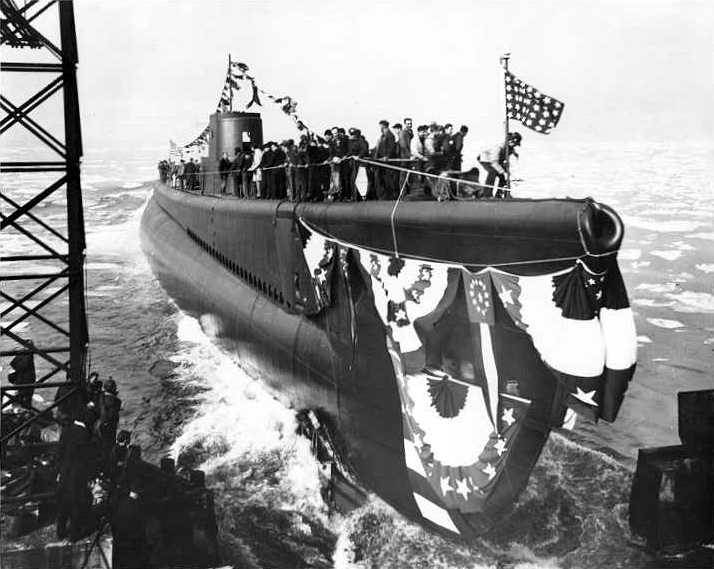
- Bluefish slides down the ways at Groton, 21 February 1943.

History

United States
- Builder: Electric Boat Company, Groton, Connecticut
- Laid down: 5 June 1942
- Launched: 21 February 1943
- Sponsored by: Mrs. Robert Y. Menzie
- Commissioned: 24 May 1943
- Decommissioned: 12 February 1947
- Recommissioned: 7 January 1952
- Decommissioned: 20 November 1953
- Stricken: 1 September 1958
- Fate: Sold for scrap, 8 June 1960

General characteristics
- Class & type: Gato-class diesel-electric submarine
- Displacement: 1,525 long tons (1,549 t) surfaced; 2,424 long tons (2,463 t) submerged
- Length: 311 ft 9 in (95.02 m)
- Beam: 27 ft 3 in (8.31 m)
- Draft: 17 ft (5.2 m) maximum
- Propulsion: 4 × General Motors Model 16-248 V16 Diesel engines driving electric generators; 2 × 126-cell Sargo batteries; 4 × high-speed General Electric electric motors with reduction gears; two propellers; 5,400 shp (4.0 MW) surfaced; 2,740 shp (2.0 MW) submerged
- Speed: 21 kn (24 mph; 39 km/h) surfaced; 9 kn (17 km/h; 10 mph) submerged
- Range: 11,000 nautical miles (13,000 mi; 20,000 km) surfaced at 10 kn (12 mph; 19 km/h)
- Endurance: 48 hours at 2 kn (4 km/h) submerged; 75 days on patrol
- Test depth: 300 ft (90 m)
- Complement: 6 officers, 54 enlisted (peacetime)
- Armament: 10 × 21-inch (533 mm) torpedo tubes; 6 forward, 4 aft; 24 torpedoes; 1 × 3-inch (76 mm) / 50 caliber deck gun; Bofors 40 mm and Oerlikon 20 mm cannon

USS Bluefish (SS-222), a Gato-class submarine, was the first ship of the United States Navy to be named for the bluefish. Between 9 September 1943 and 29 July 1945 she completed nine war patrols. Her operating area extended from the Netherlands East Indies to the waters south of Honshū. According to the notoriously unreliable JANAC accounting, Bluefish sank 12 Japanese ships totaling 50,839 tons.

== Construction and training ==
Bluefish was laid down 5 June 1942 by Electric Boat Co., Groton, CT. She was launched 21 February 1943 (sponsored by Mrs. Robert Y. Menzie), and commissioned 24 May 1943. Bluefish departed New London 21 July and reported to Task Force 72 (TF 72) at Brisbane, Australia on 21 August 1943.

- On 8 September 1943, a Royal Australian Air Force Catalina flying boat mistakenly strafed Bluefish in the Timor Sea north of Melville Island.

== First war patrol ==
Bluefish departed Brisbane on 9 September 1943 to patrol the South China Sea for 25 days. On 25 September Bluefish torpedoed the Japanese merchantman Akashi Maru (3228 GRT) south-east of Celebes, Netherlands East Indies, in the Flores Sea. While following the damaged Akashi Maru, Bluefish torpedoed and sank the Japanese torpedo boat Kasasagi (595 tons) on 27 September about 25 nmi (46 km; 29 mi) south of Celebes. On 29 September Bluefish found and sank the damaged Akashi Maru north of Wetar.

== Second war patrol ==
Bluefish departed Fremantle in October 1943 for a 32-day patrol of the South China Sea. On 8 November Bluefish torpedoed and sank the Japanese tanker Kyokuei Maru (10570 GRT) in the South China Sea. On 18 November Bluefish torpedoed and sank the old escorting destroyer IJN Sanae and damaged the Japanese fleet oiler Ondo (14050 GRT) in the Celebes Sea about 90 nmi (170 km; 100 mi) south of Basilan Island.

== Third war patrol ==
Bluefish departed Fremantle in December 1943 for a 27-day patrol of the South China Sea. On 30 December, she sank the Japanese oiler Ichiyu Maru (5061 GRT) in the Java Sea. After laying mines off the eastern Malayan coast on 3 January 1944, Bluefish attacked a Japanese convoy off Indo-China together with Rasher. Bluefish torpedoed and sank the Japanese tanker Hakko Maru (6046 GRT) on 4 January.

== Fourth war patrol ==
Bluefish departed Fremantle in February 1944 under the command of Charles M. Henderson for a 58-day patrol of the South China Sea. on 4 March Bluefish torpedoed and sank the Japanese oiler Ominesan Maru (10536 GRT) in the South China Sea about 300 nmi (560 km; 350 mi) west of Miri, Sarawak.

== Fifth war patrol ==
Bluefish departed Fremantle in May 1944 for a 53-day patrol of the Celebes Sea. On 16 June, she sank the Japanese merchant Nanshin Maru (1422 GRT) in the Celebes Sea south-west of Tarakan, Borneo. On 21 June, she sank the Japanese transport Kanan Maru (3280 GRT) off the southern approaches to Makassar Strait.

== Sixth war patrol ==
Bluefish departed Fremantle in July 1944 for a 54-day patrol to Pearl Harbor. On 14 August, she sank the tanker Shinpo Maru (5,135 GRT), damaged by Puffer (SS-268) on 12 August, off Golo Island. On 19 August, Bluefish attacked convoy Hi-71, sinking the Japanese fleet tanker/seaplane carrier Hayasui (18,300 GRT) some 80 nmi (150 km; 92 mi) northwest of Cape Bolinao and damaging the Japanese transport Awa Maru (11,249 GRT) at 17°36′N 119°38′E.

== Seventh war patrol ==
Bluefish departed Pearl Harbor in February 1945 for an unproductive 42-day patrol of Japanese coastal waters with the exception of March 1, 1945. While on lifeguard duty, 'Bluefish' had the satisfaction of rescuing two U.S.N.R. crew members who had bailed out of their badly damaged plane, and recovering the pilot of the aircraft. Badly wounded, Lt. Jacob Matthew Reisert had managed to keep his aircraft airborne long enough to bring his crew to safety before succumbing to shrapnel wounds, shock, and drowning.

== Eighth war patrol ==
Bluefish departed Pearl Harbor in April 1945 under the command of George W. Forbes for an unproductive 38-day patrol to Fremantle.

== Ninth war patrol ==
Bluefish departed Fremantle in June 1945 for a 33-day patrol of the South China Sea. On 15 July, she sank the Japanese submarine I-351 (2650 tons) in the South China Sea about 100 nmi (190 km; 120 mi) east-north-east of Natuna Besar off Borneo. Four days later, she sank a No.1-class submarine chaser by gunfire east of Sumatra, Netherlands East Indies, at 00°04′N 105°08′E.

== Post-war operations ==
With the cessation of hostilities, Bluefish returned to the United States, arriving at Philadelphia Navy Yard 9 October 1945. She was placed in the 16th Fleet and on 31 October moved to the Submarine Base, New London. She was later towed to Electric Boat Co., Groton, where she underwent repairs. On 12 June 1946 she returned to New London where she went out of commission in reserve 12 February 1947.

Bluefish was recommissioned 7 January 1952 at the Submarine Base, New London, and reported to Submarine Division 82, Atlantic Fleet. On 7 April she proceeded to Key West, Florida, and reported to Submarine Division 41 on 11 April. She operated along the Florida coast and in the Caribbean, engaging in local operations and training exercises until May 1953.

On 7 June 1953 Bluefish arrived at the Portsmouth Naval Shipyard in Kittery, Maine. Following pre-inactivation overhaul at the shipyard, she was placed out of commission in reserve at New London 20 November 1953.

== Honors and awards ==
- Asiatic-Pacific Campaign Medal with 10 battle stars for World War II service
