= Mako Guard District =

Imperial Japanese naval base in Taiwan

Coordinates: 23°35′24″N 119°34′05″E

The Mako Guard District (馬公警備府, Makō Keibifu) was the major navy base for the Imperial Japanese Navy in Taiwan before and during World War II. Located in Mako, (present-day Makung, Pescadores Islands, Republic of China), the Mako Guard District was responsible for control of the strategic Straits of Taiwan and for patrols along the Taiwan and China coastlines and in the South China Sea. It was disbanded in 1943, and reestablished as the Takao Guard District at Takao on the Taiwan main island.

== History ==
The Guard Districts (警備府, Keibifu) were second tier naval bases, similar to the first tier Naval Districts (鎮守府), with docking, fueling and resupply facilities, but typically lacked a shipyard or training school. They tended to be established by strategic waterways or major port cities for defensive purposes. In concept, the Guard District was similar to the United States Navy Sea Frontiers concept. the Guard District maintained a small garrison force of ships and Naval Land Forces which reported directly to the Guard District commander, and hosted detachments of the numbered fleets on a temporary assignment basis.

The port of Mako in the Pescadores Islands was an area with a long association with the Imperial Japanese Navy, having been the first portion of Taiwan captured during the Japanese invasion of Taiwan in the First Sino-Japanese War. Mako was designated a third echelon naval port, or yokobu (要港部) on 4 July 1901. It served as a staging point and refueling base in the Russo-Japanese War, and especially during the early stages of the Second Sino-Japanese War.

Mako was upgraded to full Guard District status on 20 November 1941, and served as a staging group and supply base for the invasion of the Philippines and other naval operations in Southeast Asia after the start of the Pacific War. In 1943, the base was relocated to Takao (now called Kaohsiung)on the Taiwanese mainland.

== Order of Battle at time of the attack on Pearl Harbor ==
- Mako Guard District
  - PG Akitsu Maru
  - PG Chiyo Maru
  - PG Chohakusan Maru
  - AK Kure Maru No.5
- Mako Air Group
  - 3x Aichi D1A Susie
  - Minesweeper Division 44
  - Minesweeper Division 45
  - Minesweeper Division 46

== List of Commanders ==
=== Commanding Officer ===
- Vice-Admiral Hikonojō Kamimura (4 July 1901 – 23 September 1903)
- Vice-Admiral Tomomichi Onomoto (23 September 1903 – 13 June 1905)
- Vice-Admiral Nagataka Uemura (13 June 1905 – 20 December 1905)
- Vice-Admiral Baron Masaaki Hashimoto (20 December 1905 – 22 November 1906)
- Vice-Admiral Baron Tokioki Nashiba (22 November 1906 – 12 March 1907)
- Vice-Admiral Baron Yunoshin Kano (12 March 1907 – 1 December 1909)
- Vice-Admiral Chikakata Tamari (1 December 1909 – 1 December 1910)
- Vice-Admiral Hikojiro Ijichi (1 December 1910 – 1 December 1911)
- Vice-Admiral Kotaro Koizumi (1 December 1911 – 14 April 1913)
- Vice-Admiral Baron Shinrokuro Nishi (14 April 1913 – 1 December 1913)
- Vice-Admiral Tadamichi Kamaya (1 December 1913 – 17 December 1914)
- Vice-Admiral Rinroku Eguchi (17 December 1914 – 13 December 1915)
- Admiral Teijiro Kuroi (13 December 1915 – 1 December 1916)
- Vice-Admiral Tatsuo Matsumura (1 December 1916 – 12 December 1917)
- Vice-Admiral Tomojiro Chisaka (12 December 1917 – 13 June 1918)
- Vice-Admiral Kazuyoshi Yamaji (13 June 1918 – 1 December 1919)
- Rear-Admiral Shigeushi Nakagawa (1 December 1919 – 1 December 1920)
- Admiral Naomi Taniguchi (1 December 1920 – 1 August 1921)
- Vice-Admiral Kiyokaze Yoshida (1 August 1921 – 26 December 1921)
- Vice-Admiral Hisatsune Iida (26 December 1921 – 1 June 1923)
- Vice-Admiral Shiro Yamauchi (1 June 1923 – 6 November 1923)
- Vice-Admiral Tadatsugu Tajiri (6 November 1923 – 20 December 1924)
- Vice-Admiral Eizaburo Fujiwara (20 December 1924 – 1 August 1925)
- Vice-Admiral Nobutaro Iida (1 August 1925 – 1 December 1927)
- Rear-Admiral Kesaichi Hitsuda (1 December 1927 – 10 December 1928)
- Vice-Admiral Eijiro Hamano (10 December 1928 – 1 December 1930)
- Vice-Admiral Shusei Yuchi (1 December 1930 – 11 January 1932)
- Vice-Admiral Akira Goto (11 January 1932 – 18 June 1932)
- Rear-Admiral Toyonaka Yamauchi (18 June 1932 – 15 November 1933)
- Vice-Admiral Yoshiyuki Niyama (15 November 1933 – 15 November 1934)
- Vice-Admiral Hiroshi Ono (15 November 1934 – 15 November 1935)
- Vice-Admiral Senzo Wada (15 November 1935 – 1 December 1937)
- Vice-Admiral Shunzo Mito (1 December 1937 – 15 November 1938)
- Vice-Admiral Goro Hara (15 November 1938 – 15 November 1939)
- Vice-Admiral Ibo Takahashi (15 November 1939 – 27 February 1941)
- Vice-Admiral Koki Yamamoto (27 February 1941 – 20 November 1942)
- Admiral Takeo Takagi (20 November 1942 – 1 April 1943)

=== Chief of Staff ===
- Vice-Admiral Baron Shinrokuro Nishi (25 December 1904 – 14 June 1905)
- Vice-Admiral Baron Mitsukane Tsuchiya (14 June 1905 – 10 May 1906)
- Rear-Admiral Sango Obana (11 May 1906 – 5 August 1907)
- Rear-Admiral Kanetane Imai (5 August 1907 – 28 August 1908)
- Rear-Admiral Juntaro Hirose (28 August 1908 – 11 October 1909)
- Rear-Admiral Yushichi Kanno (8 October 1910 – 12 June 1911)
- Rear-Admiral Koki Hirose (12 June 1911 – 20 April 1912)
- Rear-Admiral Eitaro Kataoka (20 April 1912 – 1 December 1913)
- Vice- Admiral Kotaro Tanaka (1 December 1913 – 7 August 1914)
- Rear-Admiral Shigeushi Nakagawa (7 August 1914 – 1 September 1915)
- Rear- Admiral Moshiro Iwasaki (1 September 1915 – 28 January 1916)
- Rear- Admiral Hisamori Taguchi (28 January 1916 – 1 December 1917)
- Rear-Admiral Yoshitada Mikami (1 December 1918 – 26 July 1920)
- Rear-Admiral Morie Tokiwa (1 March 1923 – 1 December 1924)
- Rear-Admiral Shinichi Oguri (1 December 1924 – 1 April 1925)
- Rear-Admiral Junzo Yoshitake (1 July 1926 – 15 November 1927)
- Rear-Admiral Tadashi Kurata (15 November 1927 – 30 October 1929)
- Rear-Admiral Seizaburo Mitsui (20 November 1929 – 15 May 1931)
- Vice- Admiral Shunzo Mito (15 May 1931 – 1 December 1932)
- Rear-Admiral Shinji Suzuki (1 December 1932 – 1 November 1934)
- Rear-Admiral Tsuyoshi Kobata (1 November 1934 – 1 December 1936)
- Vice- Admiral Shigeyoshi Miwa (1 December 1936 – 15 December 1938)
- Rear-Admiral Raizo Tanaka (15 December 1938 – 15 November 1939)
- Rear-Admiral Akira Matsuzaki (15 November 1939 – 10 May 1941)
- Vice- Admiral Toshio Shimazaki (10 May 1941 – 1 April 1943)

== See also ==
- Zuoying Naval Base
