= Japanese submarine I-162 =

Imperial Japanese Navy Kaidai-class cruiser submarine of the KD4 sub-class

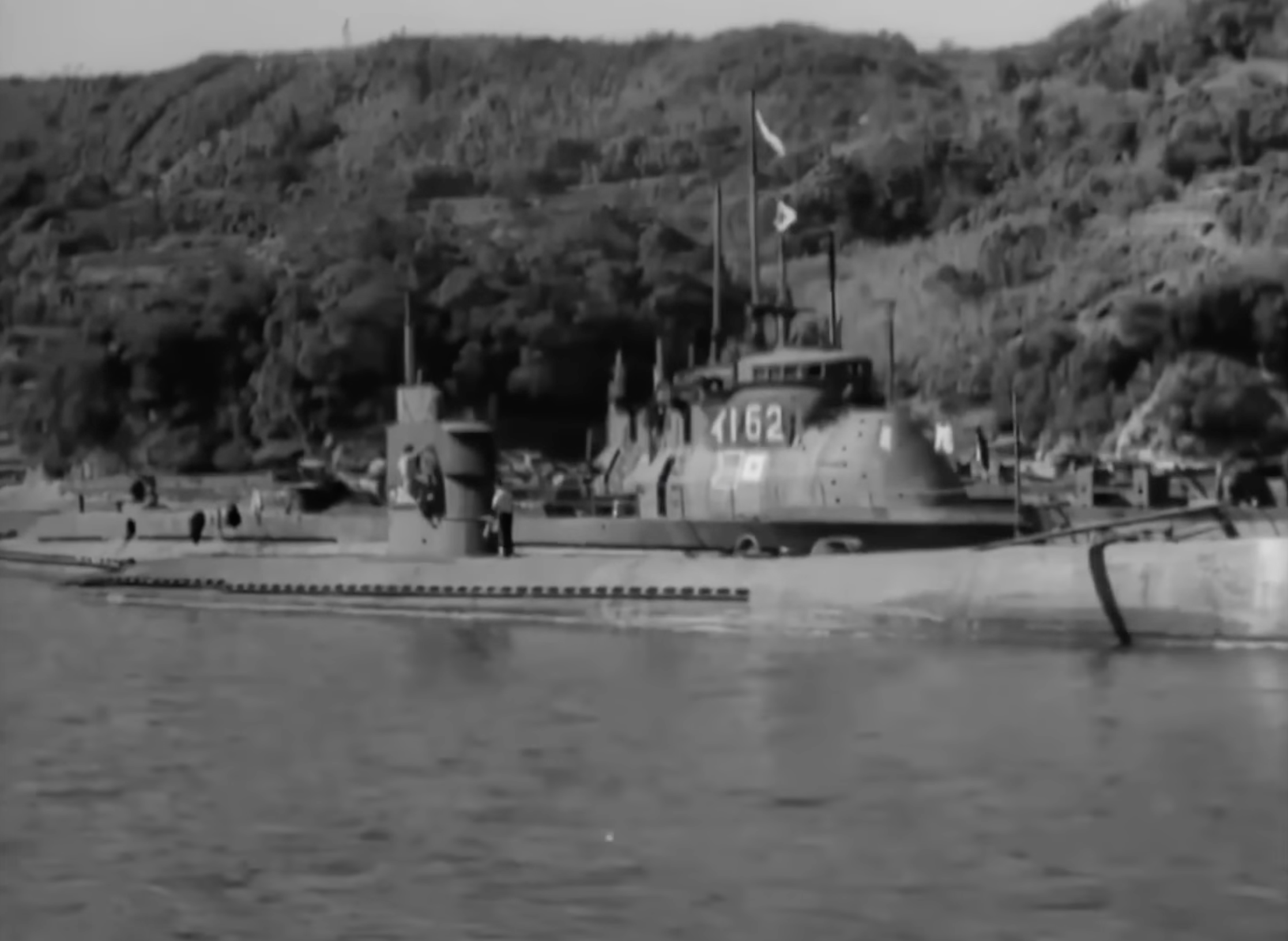
- I-162 anchored in Sasebo, April 1946

History

Empire of Japan
- Name: I-62
- Builder: Mitsubishi Kobe Yard, Kobe, Japan
- Laid down: 20 April 1927
- Launched: 29 November 1928
- Completed: 24 April 1930
- Commissioned: 24 April 1930
- Decommissioned: 21 October 1935
- Recommissioned: 10 April 1936
- Decommissioned: 15 November 1939
- Recommissioned: 30 October 1940 or 1 July 1941 (see text)
- Renamed: I-162, 20 May 1942
- Fate: Surrendered 2 September 1945; Stricken 30 November 1945; Scuttled 1 April 1946

General characteristics
- Class & type: KD4 Type, Kadai type submarine
- Displacement: 1,635 (1,720 maximum) tons surfaced; 2,300 tons submerged
- Length: 97.70 m (320 ft 6 in)
- Beam: 7.80 m (25 ft 7 in)
- Draught: 4.83 m (15 ft 10 in)
- Propulsion: Surface: 2 x Rauschenbach Mk 2 diesel engines, 6,000 hp (4,474 kW), two shafts, 230 tons fuel; Submerged: Electric motor, 1,800 hp (1,342 kW)
- Speed: 20 knots (37 km/h; 23 mph) diesel; 8.5 knots (15.7 km/h; 9.8 mph) electric
- Range: Surface: 10,800 nmi (20,000 km; 12,400 mi) at 10 knots (19 km/h; 12 mph); Submerged: 60 nmi (110 km; 69 mi) at 3 knots (5.6 km/h; 3.5 mph)
- Test depth: 60 m (197 ft)
- Complement: 58 officers and enlisted
- Armament: 6 x 533 mm (21 in) torpedo tubes (4 bow, 2 stern)/14 x 533 mm (21 in) Type 89 torpedo torpedoes; 1 x 120 mm (4.7 in) gun; 1 × 7.7 mm (0.3 in) machine gun

I-62, later I-162, was a Kaidai-class cruiser submarine of the KD4 sub-class built for the Imperial Japanese Navy (IJN) during the 1920s and completed in 1930. She served throughout World War II, supporting the Japanese invasion of Malaya, taking part in the Battle of Midway, carrying out diversionary operations in support of the evacuation of Japanese forces from Guadalcanal, and conducting war patrols in the Indian Ocean. Late in the war, she became involved in supporting and training for kaiten suicide attack torpedo operations. She surrendered to the Allies at the end of the war in 1945, and the United States Navy scuttled her in 1946.

== Construction and commissioning ==
Built by Mitsubishi at Kobe, Japan, I-62 was laid down on 20 April 1927 and launched on 29 November 1928. She was completed and accepted into Imperial Japanese Navy service on 24 April 1930.

== Service history ==
=== Pre-World War II ===
Upon commissioning, I-62 was attached to the Sasebo Naval District and was assigned along with her sister ship I-61 to Submarine Division 29, in which she served until 1942. The newly commissioned submarine I-64 joined I-61 and I-62 in the division on 30 August 1930. Submarine Division 29 in turn was assigned to Submarine Squadron 1 in the 1st Fleet, a component of the Combined Fleet, on 1 December 1930. Submarine Division 29 was reassigned to the Sasebo Defense Division in the Sasebo Naval District on 10 November 1932. On 15 November 1933, Submarine Division 29 was reassigned to Submarine Squadron 2 in the 2nd Fleet, also a component of the Combined Fleet.

I-62 departed Ryojun, Manchukuo, on 27 September 1934 in company with I-61, I-64, and the submarines I-56, I-57, I-58, I-65, I-66, and I-67 to conduct a training cruise in the Qingdao area off China. The nine submarines completed the cruise with their arrival at Sasebo, Japan, on 5 October 1934. On 7 February 1935, I-62 departed Sasebo in company with the other eight submarines of Submarine Squadron 2 — I-53, I-54, I-55, I-59, I-60, I-61, I-63, and I-64 — for a training cruise in the Kuril Islands. The cruise concluded with their arrival at Sukumo Bay on 25 February 1935. The nine submarines departed Sasebo on 29 March 1935 to train in Chinese waters, returning to Sasebo on 4 April 1935. I-62 was decommissioned and placed in reserve on 21 October 1935.

While I-62 was in reserve, Submarine Division 29 began a second assignment to the Sasebo Defense Division in the Sasebo Naval District on 15 November 1935, and was serving in this capacity when I-62 was recommissioned on or about 10 April 1936 and rejoined the division. The assignment ended on 1 December 1936, when the division again began duty in Submarine Squadron 2 in the 2nd Fleet in the Combined Fleet, an assignment that lasted until 15 December 1938. Submarine Division 29 then served at the submarine school at Kure, Japan, from 15 December 1938 to 15 November 1939, when I-62 and I-64 were decommissioned and placed in the Third Reserve in the Sasebo Naval District.

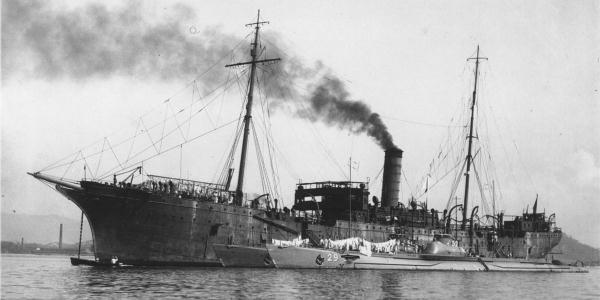
I-162 moored alongside I-61 and the submarine tender Karasaki in the Seto Inland Sea, 1930

While I-62 was in reserve again, her diesel engines and torpedo tubes were replaced. According to one source, she was recommissioned on or about 30 October 1940 and resumed service with Submarine Division 29, which was reassigned to Submarine Squadron 5 in the Combined Fleet on 15 November 1940, while another source claims that her modifications took place from 1940 to 1941 and she was recommissioned on or about 1 July 1941, when she rejoined Submarine Division 29.

As the Imperial Japanese Navy began to deploy in preparation for the impending conflict in the Pacific, Submarine Division 29, still made of I-62 and I-64, departed Sasebo, Japan, on 26 November 1941 bound for Palau along with the rest of Submarine Squadron 5, namely the submarines of Submarine Division 30 and the squadron's flagship, the light cruiser Yura. While en route, the entire squadron was diverted to Samah on Hainan Island in China.

=== World War II ===
==== First war patrol ====
On 5 December 1941, I-62 departed Samah to begin what would become her first war patrol. When the Japanese invasion of Malaya began on 8 December 1941 — the first day of the war in East Asia — I-62 was in the South China Sea off Trengganu, British Malaya, operating on a patrol line with the submarines I-57, I-58, I-64, and I-66. Reassigned to Patrol Unit "B" on 26 December 1941, she concluded her patrol by arriving at Cam Ranh Bay in Japanese-occupied French Indochina on 27 December 1941.

==== Second war patrol ====
As a unit of Patrol Group "B," I-62 was among submarines tasked with attacking Allied shipping in the Indian Ocean west of the 106 degrees East, operating from a new base at newly captured Penang in Japanese-occupied British Malaya. Accordingly, on 7 January 1942 I-62 departed Cam Ranh Bay to begin her second war patrol. With a large British minefield reported in the Strait of Malacca, she took a circuitous route to her patrol area in the Indian Ocean which took her along the south coast of Java. At 02:40 on 28 January 1942, she unsuccessfully attacked a tanker west of Ceylon. On 31 January 1942, she attacked and seriously damaged the British 9,463-gross register ton oiler Longwood 24 nautical miles (44 km; 28 mi) west of Ceylon. Longwood survived and made it to Colombo, Ceylon. The Hellenic Navy destroyer Vasilissa Olga and two Royal Navy ships — the sloop-of-war HMS Falmouth and the auxiliary patrol boat HMS Okapi — began a search for I-62 but failed to find her.

I-62 attacked and damaged the British 7,402-gross register ton armed tanker Spondilus in the Indian Ocean at 06°16′N 079°38′E on 3 February 1942 after 23:00. Spondilus claimed to have damaged I-62 with gunfire. Falmouth and Okapi mounted another search for I-62, again without success, and I-62 concluded her patrol by arriving at Penang on 10 February 1942.

==== Third war patrol ====
I-62 departed Penang for her third war patrol, again in the Indian Ocean, on 28 February 1942. On 10 March 1942 — the day on which Submarine Division 29 was dissolved and I-62 was reassigned to Submarine Division 28 — she sank the 235-gross register ton British sailing ship Lakshmi Govinda at 13°22′N 087°27′E with gunfire. She torpedoed the British 8,012-gross register ton motor tanker San Cirilo south of Colombo at 06°40′N 079°40′E at 11:32 on 21 March 1942, but San Cirilo survived and arrived at Colombo on 23 March 1942. I-62 torpedoed an unidentified passenger-cargo ship on 22 March 1942 in the Indian Ocean east of the northern entrance to Palk Strait at 10°50′N 083°59′E, but it also survived. She concluded her patrol with her arrival at Penang on 25 March 1942.

==== April–May 1942 ====
On 2 April 1942, I-62 departed Penang bound for Sasebo. During her voyage, Submarine Division 28 was dissolved and she was reassigned to Submarine Division 3 on 10 April 1942. She arrived at Sasebo on 12 April 1942. On 28 May 1942 she departed Sasebo bound for Kwajalein, deploying in support of Operation MI, the planned invasion of Midway Atoll. During her voyage, she was renumbered I-162 on 20 May 1942. She arrived at Kwajalein on 28 May 1942.

==== Fourth war patrol: The Battle of Midway ====
On 26 May 1942, I-162 departed Kwajalein to conduct her fourth war patrol, operating in support of Operation MI, the planned Japanese invasion of Midway Atoll in the Northwestern Hawaiian Islands, in which Submarine Squadron 5 formed part of the Advance Expeditionary Force. She operated in a patrol line between 28°20′N 162°20′W and 26°00′N 165°00′W which also included the submarines I-156, I-157, I-158, I-159, I-165, and I-166. The Japanese suffered a decisive defeat on 4 June 1942 during the Battle of Midway, and that day the commander-in-chief of the 6th Fleet, Vice Admiral Teruhisa Komatsu, ordered the 15 submarines in the Japanese submarine patrol line to move westward.

After the commander-in-chief of the Combined Fleet, Admiral Isoroku Yamamoto, ordered Komatsu to interpose his submarines between the retreating Japanese fleet and the opposing United States Navy aircraft carriers, the Japanese submarines, including I-162, began a gradual movement to the north-northwest, moving at 3 knots (5.6 km/h; 3.5 mph) by day and 14 knots (26 km/h; 16 mph) after dark. I-162 made no contact with enemy forces during the battle and returned to Kwajalein on 21 June 1942.

==== June–July 1942 ====
I-162 got back underway on 24 June 1942 to return to Sasebo, where she arrived on 1 July 1942. During her stay at Sasebo, Submarine Squadron 5 was disbanded on 10 July 1942. On 14 July 1942, she was reassigned to Submarine Squadron 30 in the Southwest Area Fleet along with the submarines I-8, I-165, and I-166 and the submarine tender Rio de Janeiro Maru. For her new assignment, she departed Sasebo on 22 July 1942 bound for Penang, making a stop at Cam Ranh Bay along the way.

==== Fifth and sixth war patrols ====
I-162 departed Penang on 23 August 1942 to conduct her fifth war patrol, targeting Allied shipping in the Bay of Bengal. The patrol was uneventful, and she returned to Penang on 12 September 1942.

I-162 got underway again from Penang on 28 September 1942 for her sixth war patrol, again in the Bay of Bengal. She was east of Visakhapatnam, India, at 14:52 on 3 October 1942 when she torpedoed the Soviet 2,332-gross register ton armed timber ship Mikoyan, which was bound from Calcutta to Karachi with a general cargo. A torpedo struck Mikoyan on her starboard side between holds 1 and 2. After Mikoyan′s pumps failed, her crew transmitted an SOS and abandoned ship. Mikoyan sank at 15:09 at 19°24′N 085°24′E.

At 16:24 on 7 October 1942, while 400 nautical miles (740 km; 460 mi) southeast of Masulipatam, India, I-162 torpedoed the British 5,597-gross register ton armed steamer Manon, which was bound from Calcutta and Visakhapatnam to Colombo with a cargo of 7,100 tons of coal. Manon sank at 15°00′N 080°30′E with the loss of eight lives.

I-162 torpedoed the British 4,161-gross register ton steamer Martaban in the Bay of Bengal east of Dondra Head, Ceylon, at 16:20 on 13 October 1942 at 06°31′N 082°03′E. One of I-162′s torpedoes hit Martaban in her bow, killing two members of her crew and igniting a large fire. Martaban′s crew abandoned ship. Several Royal Australian Air Force Catalina flying boats arrived on the scene to assist Martaban′s crew and search for I-162, but I-162 evaded them. Ultimately, the Royal Australian Navy corvette HMAS Launceston rescued 61 survivors from Martaban, which remained afloat and later was towed to Colombo. I-162 concluded her patrol with her return to Penang on 18 October 1942.

==== Seventh, eighth, and ninth war patrols ====
In early November 1942, I-162 left Penang to begin another war patrol in the Indian Ocean, but had to return almost immediately for engine repairs. On 15 November 1942, she left Penang bound for Surabaya, Java, where she arrived on 21 November 1942. From Surabaya, she set out on 24 November 1942 to for her seventh war patrol, which had been moved to the Arafura Sea. It was uneventful, and she returned to Surabaya on 17 December 1942. On 7 January 1943, she again departed Surabaya for her eighth war patrol, this time in the Arafura Sea and the Gulf of Carpentaria. She again had no success, and returned to Surabaya on 13 January 1943.

For her ninth war patrol, I-162 deployed to support Operation Ke — the evacuation of Guadalcanal as the Guadalcanal campaign ended in a Japanese defeat — by conducting diversionary operations off the northwest coast of Australia. Departing Surabaya on 26 January 1943, she conducted a reconnaissance of Cocos Island in late January 1943. On 14 February 1943, the United States Navy submarine USS Thresher (SS-200) attacked her off the Lesser Sunda Islands east of Thwartway Island at 06°05′S 105°47′E. Thresher fired two Mark 14 torpedoes, one of which failed to detonate, while the other missed and exploded without damaging I-162. I-162 opened fire on Thresher with her deck guns, turned north, and escaped unharmed. She returned to Surabaya on 16 February 1943.

==== February–October 1943 ====
In late February 1943, I-162 departed Surabaya bound for Sasebo. During her voyage, she was reassigned to Submarine Squadron 8's Submarine Division 30. She arrived at Sasebo on 10 March 1943 and began overhaul and repairs there. With the work completed, she departed Kure on 4 September 1943, heading south to return to combat. During her voyage, she was reassigned to the Submarine Unit of the Southwest Area Fleet on 12 September 1943. She arrived at Penang on 16 September 1943, then departed on 27 September 1943 bound for Sabang at the northern end of Sumatra, where she arrived on 3 October 1943.

==== Tenth, eleventh, and twelfth war patrols ====
On 6 October 1943, I-162 departed Sabang to conduct her tenth war patrol. She was reassigned to Submarine Division 30 in the 8th Fleet on 9 October 1943, but otherwise she patrolled in the Indian Ocean uneventfully and she concluded the patrol with her arrival at Penang on 9 November 1943. On 12 November 1943 she left Penang bound for Singapore, where she remained until 1 December 1943, when she began a return voyage to Penang. On 14 December 1943 she again left Penang for her eleventh war patrol, again in the Indian Ocean, but made no attacks on enemy ships, and she completed the patrol by returning to Singapore on 22 January 1944.

On 22 February 1944, I-162 set out from Penang on her twelfth war patrol, again in the Indian Ocean. At 13:50 on 4 March 1944, she torpedoed the British 7,127-gross register ton armed merchant steamer SS Fort McCleod — bound from Cochin, India, to Durban, South Africa, with a cargo of 2,000 tons of copper and 1,000-tons of military supplies — southwest of the Maldive Islands and 300 nautical miles (560 km; 350 mi) or 350 nautical miles (650 km; 400 mi) south-southwest of Ceylon, then surfaced to finish off Fort McCloud with gunfire. Fort McCloud sank at 02°01′N 077°06′E. I-162 also reported sinking a transport in the Indian Ocean west of One and a Half Degree Channel at 06°12′N 071°18′E on 18 March 1944. She returned to Penang on 25 March 1944.

==== March 1944–September 1945 ====
When I-162 returned to Penang, Submarine Division 30 was dissolved and she was reassigned to the Kure Guard Submarine Squadron. Accordingly, she soon departed Penang for Japan, and she arrived at Kure on 15 April 1944. She subsequently served on training duties in the western Seto Inland Sea. She arrived at Yokosuka on 30 April 1944. On 25 June 1944 she was reassigned to Submarine Division 19 in the Kure Submarine Squadron.

==== Kaiten carrier ====
On 1 April 1945, I-162 was reassigned to Submarine Division 34, and then was to carry kaiten manned suicide attack torpedoes. She then made voyages ferrying kaiten between shore bases.

While I-162 was making a trip to Korea to pick up fuel, she ran aground on the south coast of the Korean Peninsula on 26 June 1945, suffering minor damage. She and I-156 made a round trip to Dairen, Manchukuo, in late June and early July 1945 to obtain fuel. In July and August 1945, her crew — along with the crews of I-156, I-157, I-158, and I-159 — was trained to launch kaiten in combat to oppose Allied ships during the Allied invasion of Japan that the Japanese expected, and I-162 made another round trip to Dairen to pick up fuel for this training. I-162 was in the Pacific Ocean off Cape Ashizuri during her return voyage to Japan from Dairen when at 04:36 on 10 July 1945 the U.S. Navy submarine USS Lionfish (SS-298) detected the noise of her propellers. At 04:37, Lionfish sighted I-162 crossing her stern at 14 knots (26 km/h; 16 mph). Using radar to determine the range, Lionfish fired five Mark 18 torpedoes from her bow tubes at I-162 from an average distance of 1,050 yards (960 m). Lionfish′s crew reported hearing two explosions followed by break-up noises and sighting a cloud of smoke at 32°45′N 131°46′E. However, I-162 suffered no damage and reached Kure later the same day.

On 15 August 1945, I-162 was reassigned to Submarine Division 15. That same day, hostilities between Japan and the Allies ceased. On 2 September 1945, I-162 surrendered to Allied forces.

== Summery of raiding history ==
| Date | Name | Classification | Tonnage | Nationality | Sunk |
|---|---|---|---|---|---|
| 31 January 1942 | Longwood | Oiler | 9,463 | British | Damaged |
| 3 February 1942 | Spondilus | Tanker | 7,402 | British | Damaged |
| 10 March 1942 | Lakshmi Govinda | Sailship | 235 | British | Sunk |
| 21 March 1942 | San Cirilo | Motor tanker | 8,012 | British | Damaged |
| 3 October 1942 | Mikoyan | Cargo ship | 2,332 | Russia | Sunk |
| 7 October 1942 | Manon | Armed steamship | 5,597 | British | Sunk |
| 13 October 1942 | Martaban | Steamship | 4,161 | British | Damaged |
| 4 March 1944 | Fort McCloud | Armed merchant ship | 7,127 | British | Sunk |

== Disposal ==
Under U.S. Navy control, I-162 moved to Sasebo in October 1945, and she was stricken from the Navy list on 30 November 1945. After I-162 was stripped of all usable equipment and material, she was scheduled for scuttling in Operation Road's End. Accordingly, the U.S. Navy submarine tender USS Nereus (AS-17) towed her from Sasebo to an area off Goto Retto and sank her with gunfire on 1 April 1946 at 32°37′N 129°17′E.
