= Japanese submarine I-157 =

Imperial Japanese Navy Kaidai-class cruiser submarine

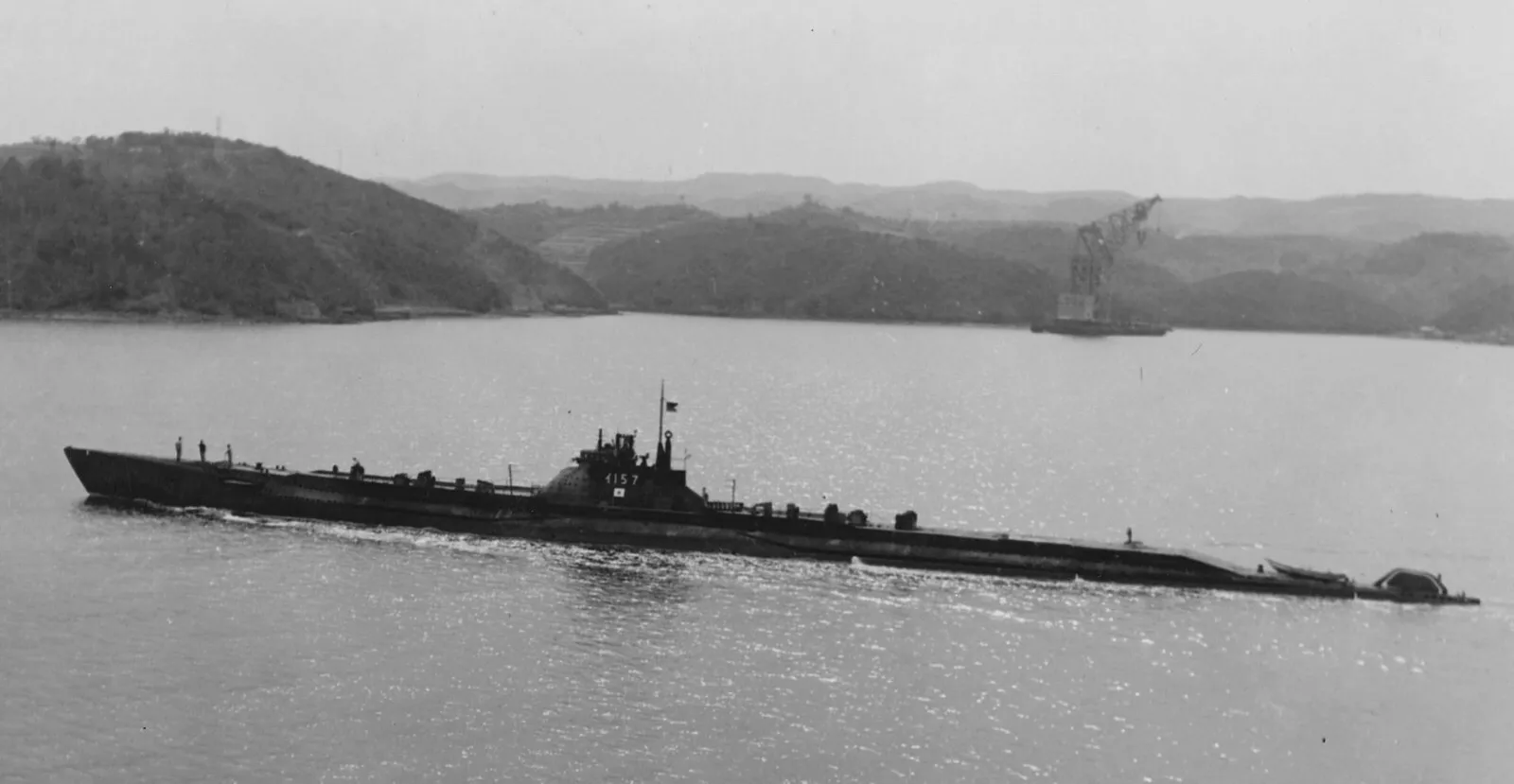
- I-157 off Singapore in 1942

History

Empire of Japan
- Name: I-57
- Builder: Kure Naval Arsenal, Kure, Japan
- Laid down: 8 July 1927
- Launched: 1 October 1928
- Completed: 24 December 1929
- Commissioned: 24 December 1929
- Decommissioned: 15 November 1930
- Recommissioned: 14 November 1931
- Decommissioned: 1 June 1932
- Recommissioned: 5 October 1932
- Decommissioned: 22 October 1934
- Recommissioned: 15 November 1935
- Decommissioned: 7 January 1937
- Recommissioned: 1 January 1938
- Decommissioned: 5 December 1938
- Recommissioned: August 1939 or 1 September 1939 (see text)
- Renamed: I-157 on 20 May 1942
- Fate: Surrendered September 1945; Stricken 30 November 1945; Scuttled 1 April 1946

General characteristics
- Class & type: Kaidai-class submarine (KD3B Type)
- Displacement: 1,829 t (1,800 long tons) surfaced; 2,337 t (2,300 long tons) submerged
- Length: 101 m (331 ft 4 in)
- Beam: 8 m (26 ft 3 in)
- Draft: 4.9 m (16 ft 1 in)
- Installed power: 6,800 bhp (5,100 kW) (diesels); 1,800 hp (1,300 kW) (electric motors)
- Propulsion: Diesel-electric; 2 × diesel engines; 2 × electric motors
- Speed: 20 knots (37 km/h; 23 mph) surfaced; 8 knots (15 km/h; 9.2 mph) submerged
- Range: 10,000 nmi (19,000 km; 12,000 mi) at 10 knots (19 km/h; 12 mph) surfaced; 90 nmi (170 km; 100 mi) at 3 knots (5.6 km/h; 3.5 mph) submerged
- Test depth: 60 m (197 ft)
- Complement: 60
- Armament: 8 × 533 mm (21 in) torpedo tubes (6 bow, 2 stern); 1 × 120 mm (4.7 in) deck gun

I-57, later I-157, was an Imperial Japanese Navy Kaidai-class cruiser submarine commissioned in 1929. During World War II, she supported Japanese forces during the invasion of Malaya in December 1941, the Dutch East Indies campaign in early 1942, and the Battle of Midway in June 1942. She then served on training duties — except for a brief period of participation in the Aleutian Islands campaign in 1943 — until she was converted into a kaiten manned suicide attack torpedo carrier in 1945. She surrendered to the Allies at the end of the war in 1945 and was scuttled in 1946.

== Design and description ==
The submarines of the KD3B sub-class essentially were repeats of the preceding KD3A sub-class with minor modifications to improve seakeeping. They displaced 1,829 metric tons (1,800 long tons) surfaced and 2,337 metric tons (2,300 long tons) submerged. The submarines were 101 meters (331 ft 4 in) long and had a beam of 8 meters (26 ft 3 in) and a draft of 4.9 meters (16 ft 1 in). They had a diving depth of 60 meters (197 ft) and a complement of 60 officers and crewmen.

For surface running, the submarines were powered by two 3,400-brake-horsepower (2,535 kW) diesel engines, each driving one propeller shaft. When submerged, each propeller was driven by a 900-horsepower (671 kW) electric motor. The submarines could reach 20 knots (37 km/h; 23 mph) on the surface and 8 knots (15 km/h; 9.2 mph) submerged. On the surface, the KD3Bs had a range of 10,000 nautical miles (19,000 km; 12,000 mi) at 10 knots (19 km/h; 12 mph); submerged, they had a range of 90 nmi (170 km; 100 mi) at 3 knots (5.6 km/h; 3.5 mph).

The submarine had eight internal 53.3 cm (21 in) torpedo tubes, six in the bow and two in the stern. They carried one reload for each tube for a total of 16 torpedoes. They also had one 120 mm (4.7 in) deck gun.

== Construction and commissioning ==
Built by the Kure Naval Arsenal at Kure, Japan, I-57 was laid down on 8 July 1927. Launched on 1 October 1928, she was completed and commissioned on 24 December 1929.

== Service history ==
=== Pre-World War II ===
On the day of her commissioning, I-57 was attached to the Kure Naval District and assigned to Submarine Division 19 in Submarine Squadron 2 in the 2nd Fleet, a component of the Combined Fleet. She was placed in reserve at Kure on 15 November 1930, but returned to active service on 14 November 1931. On 1 December 1931, Submarine Division 19 was reassigned to the Kure Defense Division in the Kure Naval District.

On 20 May 1932, Submarine Division 19 began a second stint with Submarine Squadron 2 in the 2nd Fleet, but on 1 June 1932 I-57 again was placed in reserve at Kure. She returned to active service in her division on 5 October 1932. I-57 got underway from Sasebo, Japan, on 29 June 1933 with the other submarines of her squadron — I-53, I-54 and I-55 of Submarine Division 18 and Submarine Division 19's I-56 and I-58 — for a training cruise off China and Mako in the Pescadores Islands, which the submarines concluded with their arrival at Takao, Formosa, on 5 July 1933. They departed Takao on 13 July 1933 and again trained in Chinese waters before arriving in Tokyo Bay on 21 August 1933. On 25 August 1933, all six submarines took part in a fleet review at Yokohama, Japan. On 27 September 1934, I-57 departed Ryojun, Manchukuo, in company with I-56, I-58, and the submarines I-61, I-62, I-64, I-65, I-66, and I-67 for a training cruise off Qingdao, China, which the nine submarines concluded with their arrival at Sasebo on 5 October 1934. I-57 again went into reserve at Kure on 22 October 1934, and on 15 November 1934 Submarine Division 19 was reassigned to the Kure Guard Squadron in the Kure Naval District.

I-57 resumed active service in Submarine Division 19 on 15 November 1935, and that day Submarine Division 19 was reassigned to Submarine Squadron 1 in the 1st Fleet, a component of the Combined Fleet. On 1 December 1936, Submarine Division 19 was reassigned to the Kure Naval District, in which it was placed in the First Reserve on 7 January 1937. The division returned to active service in the district on 1 January 1938, but was placed in Third Reserve on 15 December 1938, and I-57 went into reserve at Kure that day.

I-57 returned to active service in Submarine Division 19 either in August 1939 or on 1 September 1939, according to different sources, and the division as a whole began an assignment to Submarine Squadron 4 in the 1st Fleet on 15 November 1939. The squadron was assigned directly to the Combined Fleet on 15 November 1940.

As the Japanese armed forces mobilized for an offensive against Allied forces that would begin the Pacific campaign of World War II, I-57 departed Kure, Japan, on 20 November 1941 bound for Samah on China's Hainan Island, which she reached on 26 November 1941. She departed Samah on 1 December 1941 to support the offensive. Tasked with supporting Operation E, the Japanese invasion of British Malaya, I-57 proceeded to her patrol area in the South China Sea off the Malayan Peninsula.

=== World War II ===
==== First war patrol ====
Hostilities began in East Asia on 8 December 1941 (7 December across the International Date Line in Hawaii, where Japan began the war with its attack on Pearl Harbor). The Japanese invasion of British Malaya began that day, and I-57, I-58, and the submarines I-62, I-64, and I-66 formed a patrol line in the South China Sea off Trengganu, British Malaya. I-57′s patrol was uneventful, and she concluded it with her arrival at Cam Ranh Bay in Japanese-occupied French Indochina on 20 December 1941.

==== Second war patrol ====
I-57 departed Cam Ranh Bay on 28 December 1941, assigned a patrol area in the Java Sea off Surabaya, Java. At around 16:30 on 7 January 1942, she surfaced in the Bali Sea southeast of Kangean Island and opened gunfire at 07°15′S 116°23′E on the Dutch 3,077-gross register ton auxiliary tanker Tan-3, which was on a voyage from Balikpapan, Borneo, to Surabaya. Tan-3 sank, and aircraft rescued her crew on 8 January 1942. I-57 returned to Cam Ranh Bay on 16 January 1942.

==== February–May 1942 ====
An outbreak of dysentery among her crew on 7 February 1942 kept I-57 at Cam Ranh Bay until 1 March 1942, when she got underway, making for Staring Bay on the coast of Celebes, which she reached on 6 March. Submarine Squadron 4 was disbanded on 10 March 1942, and the submarines of Submarine Division 19 — I-56, I-57, and I-58 — were reassigned to Submarine Squadron 5. I-57 departed Staring Bay on 13 March 1942 bound for Kure, Japan, where she arrived on 20 March 1942 for repairs. With them complete, she got back underway from Kure on 14 May 1942 and set course for Kwajalein Atoll. During her voyage, she was renumbered I-157 on 20 May 1942. She arrived at Kwajalein on 24 May 1942.

==== Third war patrol: The Battle of Midway ====
On 26 May 1942, I-157 departed Kwajalein to conduct her third war patrol, operating in support of Operation MI, the planned Japanese invasion of Midway Atoll in the Northwestern Hawaiian Islands, in which Submarine Squadron 5 formed part of the Advance Expeditionary Force. She operated in a patrol line between 28°20′N 162°20′W and 26°00′N 165°00′W which also included the submarines I-156, I-158, I-159, I-162, I-165, and I-166. The Japanese suffered a decisive defeat on 4 June 1942 during the Battle of Midway, and that day the commander-in-chief of the 6th Fleet, Vice Admiral Teruhisa Komatsu, ordered the 15 submarines in the Japanese submarine patrol line to move westward.

After the commander-in-chief of the Combined Fleet, Admiral Isoroku Yamamoto, ordered Komatsu to interpose his submarines between the retreating Japanese fleet and the opposing United States Navy aircraft carriers, the Japanese submarines, including I-157, began a gradual movement to the north-northwest, moving at 3 knots (5.6 km/h; 3.5 mph) by day and 14 knots (26 km/h; 16 mph) after dark. I-157 made no contact with enemy forces during the battle, and returned to Kwajalein on 19 June 1942.

==== June 1942–May 1943 ====
On 22 June 1942, I-157 departed Kwajalein bound for Kure, Japan, which she reached on 30 June. On 10 July 1942, Submarine Squadron 5 was disbanded, and Submarine Division 19 — consisting of I-156, I-157, I-158, and I-159 — was reassigned to the Kure Submarine Squadron in the Kure Naval District. I-157 assumed duties as a training ship, and operated without incident until May 1943.

==== Aleutian Islands campaign ====
On 21 May 1943, Japanese Imperial General Headquarters decided to withdraw the garrison on Kiska in the Aleutian Islands and bring the Aleutian Islands campaign to a close. I-157 was attached temporarily to Submarine Squadron 1 — along with the submarines I-2, I-7, I-21, I-24, I-34, I-36, I-155, I-156, I-168, I-169, and I-171 — for the evacuation of the island. They were assigned to the Kiska Evacuation Force in the Northern District Force of the 5th Fleet.

I-157 departed Kure on 22 May 1943, called at Yokosuka, Japan, from 23 to 26 May, and then got underway for Paramushiro in the northern Kuril Islands. She arrived at Paramushiro on 1 June 1943 and refueled there along with I-7, I-21, I-155, and I-156 from the oiler Teiyō Maru on 2 June 1943. I-157 put to sea from Paramushiro on 4 June to make a supply run to Kiska with a cargo of food and ammunition. While making 14 knots (26 km/h; 16 mph) on the surface in heavy fog on 16 June 1943, she ran hard aground near Amchitka. To lighten and refloat her, her crew dumped diesel fuel, lubricating oil, torpedoes, and some of her battery cells overboard. She broke loose, but the damage she sustained prevented her from diving. She headed back to Paramushiro on the surface, arriving there on 20 June 1943 for an overnight stop and refueling from Teiyo Maru. She got back underway on 21 June 1943 and headed to Kure, where she arrived on 26 June 1943 and began repairs.

==== June 1943–April 1945 ====
Upon completion of her repairs, I-157 returned to training duties in Submarine Division 19 in the Kure Naval District. On 1 December 1943, Submarine Division 19 was reassigned to the Kure Submarine Squadron in the Kure Naval District. In December 1943, I-157 was repainted at the Kure Naval Arsenal in an experimental camouflage pattern — dark grey with a bluish hue — based on that of the German submarine U-511, which Japan had purchased from Germany in 1943 and renamed Ro-500. I-157 participated in the first stage of Submarine School tests of the paint scheme in the Iyo Nada in the Seto Inland Sea on 5 January 1944 to determine its value in the waters around Japan, the effectiveness of the camouflage pattern against detection by surface warships and aircraft, its ability to confuse enemy forces attempting to determine the submarine's course and speed, and the durability of the paint. In mid-July 1944, I-157 and the submarine Ro-49 took part in tests of the submarine version of the Type 13 air-search radar.

==== Kaiten carrier ====
On 20 April 1945, I-157 was reassigned to Submarine Division 34 in the 6th Fleet, a component of the Combined Fleet, and by May 1945 she had been modified for service as a kaiten manned suicide attack torpedo carrier by the installation on her deck of fittings for two kaiten. Between May and August 1945, she made three voyages to transport kaiten from the kaiten base at Otsushima to kaiten shore bases along the coast of Kyushu.

During July 1945, the crews of I-156, I-157, I-158, I-159, and I-162 underwent training in launching kaiten against enemy ships in the event of an invasion of Japan. According to some sources, a Type 3 sonar — a copy of the German S-Gerät — and a new fire-control system similar to the U.S. Navy's Torpedo Data Computer were installed aboard I-157 at this time, enabling her to conduct submerged attacks based on sonar bearings, and that she began testing of these systems before the end of the war.

On 15 August 1945, Emperor Hirohito announced the end of hostilities. I-156 surrendered to the Allies in September 1945, and the Japanese struck her from the navy list on 30 November 1945. She moved to Sasebo and was stripped of all usable equipment.

== Disposal ==
On 1 April 1946, the U.S. Navy submarine tender USS Nereus (AS-17) towed I-157 from Sasebo to an area off the Gotō Islands, where she was scuttled with explosive charges, one of a number of Japanese submarines scuttled that day in Operation Road's End. The demolition charges detonated at 13:18, and she sank at 13:25 at 32°37′N 129°17′E. She was the first Japanese submarine sunk that day.
