= Japanese submarine I-64 =

Kaidai-class cruiser submarine

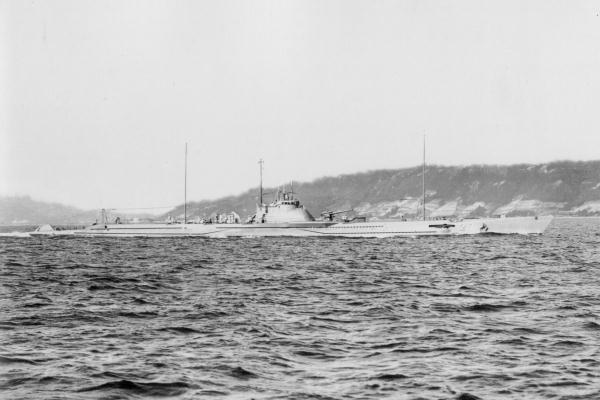
- I-64 on sea trials off Kure, Japan, on 30 August 1930.

History

Empire of Japan
- Name: I-64
- Builder: Kure Naval Arsenal, Kure, Japan
- Laid down: 28 March 1927
- Launched: 5 October 1929
- Completed: 30 August 1930
- Commissioned: 30 August 1930
- Decommissioned: 15 November 1939
- Recommissioned: 15 November 1940
- Fate: Sunk, 17 May 1942
- Renamed: I-164, 20 May 1942
- Stricken: 10 July 1942

General characteristics
- Class & type: KD4 Type, Kadai type submarine
- Displacement: 1,635 (1,720 maximum) tons surfaced; 2,300 tons submerged
- Length: 97.70 m (320 ft 6 in)
- Beam: 7.80 m (25 ft 7 in)
- Draught: 4.83 m (15 ft 10 in)
- Propulsion: Surface: 2 x Rauschenbach Mk 2 diesel engines, 6,000 hp (4,474 kW), two shafts, 230 tons fuel; Submerged: Electric motor, 1,800 hp (1,342 kW)
- Speed: 20 knots (37 km/h; 23 mph) diesel; 8.5 knots (15.7 km/h; 9.8 mph) electric
- Range: Surface: 10,800 nmi (20,000 km; 12,400 mi) at 10 knots (19 km/h; 12 mph); Submerged: 60 nmi (110 km; 69 mi) at 3 knots (5.6 km/h; 3.5 mph)
- Test depth: 60 m (197 ft)
- Complement: 58 officers and enlisted
- Armament: 6 x 533 mm (21 in) torpedo tubes (4 bow, 2 stern)/14 x 533 mm (21 in) Type 89 torpedoes; 1 x 120 mm (4.7 in) gun; 1 × 7.7 mm (0.3 in) machine gun

I-64 was an Imperial Japanese Navy Kaidai-class cruiser submarine of the KD4 sub-class commissioned in 1930. During World War II, she supported the Japanese invasion of Malaya and conducted war patrols in the Indian Ocean before she was sunk in May 1942 while deploying to take part in the upcoming Battle of Midway. Just after her loss, and before her loss became known to the Japanese, she was renumbered I-164.

== Construction and commissioning ==
Built by the Kure Naval Arsenal at Kure, Japan, I-64 was laid down on 28 March 1927 and launched on 5 October 1929. She was completed and accepted into Imperial Japanese Navy service on 30 August 1930.

== Service history ==
=== Pre-World War II ===
Upon commissioning, I-64 was attached to the Sasebo Naval District and assigned to Submarine Division 29, in which she served until 1942 alongside the submarines I-61 and I-62. Submarine Division 29 in turn was assigned to Submarine Squadron 1 in the 1st Fleet, a component of the Combined Fleet, on 1 December 1930. Submarine Division 29 was reassigned to the Sasebo Defense Division in the Sasebo Naval District on 10 November 1932. On 15 November 1933, Submarine Division 29 was reassigned to Submarine Squadron 2 in the 2nd Fleet, also a component of the Combined Fleet.

I-64 departed Ryojun, Manchukuo, on 27 September 1934 in company with I-61, I-62, and the submarines I-56, I-57, I-58, I-65, I-66, and I-67 to conduct a training cruise in the Qingdao area off China. The nine submarines completed the cruise with their arrival at Sasebo on 5 October 1934. On 7 February 1935, I-64 departed Sasebo in company with the other eight submarines of Submarine Squadron 2 — I-53, I-54, I-55, I-59, I-60, I-61, I-62, and I-63 — for a training cruise in the Kuril Islands. The cruise concluded with their arrival at Sukumo Bay on 25 February 1935. The nine submarines departed Sasebo on 29 March 1935 to train in Chinese waters, returning to Sasebo on 4 April 1935.

Submarine Division 29 had a second assignment to the Sasebo Defense Division in the Sasebo Naval District from 15 November 1935 to 1 December 1936, then again had duty in Submarine Squadron 2 in the 2nd Fleet in the Combined Fleet from 1 December 1936 to 15 December 1938. Submarine Division 29 then served at the submarine school at Kure, Japan, from 15 December 1938 to 15 November 1939, when I-64 was placed in the Third Reserve in the Sasebo Naval District. When I-64 was recommissioned on 15 November 1940, Submarine Division 29 was reassigned to Submarine Squadron 5 in the Combined Fleet.

As the Imperial Japanese Navy began to deploy in preparation for the impending conflict in the Pacific, Submarine Division 29, still made up of I-62 and I-64, departed Sasebo, Japan, on 26 November 1941 bound for Palau along with the rest of Submarine Squadron 5, namely the submarines of Submarine Division 30 and the squadron's flagship, the light cruiser Yura. While en route, the entire squadron was diverted to Samah on Hainan Island in China.

=== World War II ===
==== First war patrol ====
On 5 December 1941, I-64 departed Samah to begin what would become her first war patrol. When the Japanese invasion of Malaya began on 8 December 1941 — the first day of the war in East Asia — I-64 was in the South China Sea off Trengganu, British Malaya, operating as the easternmost submarine on a patrol line with the submarines I-57, I-58, I-62, and I-66. Reassigned to Patrol Unit "B" on 26 December 1941, she concluded her patrol by arriving at Cam Ranh Bay in Japanese-occupied French Indochina on 27 December 1941.

==== Second war patrol ====
As a unit of Patrol Group "B," I-64 was among submarines tasked with attacking Allied shipping in the Indian Ocean west of the 106th meridian east, operating from a new base at newly captured Penang in Japanese-occupied British Malaya. Accordingly, on 7 January 1942 I-64 departed Cam Ranh Bay to begin her second war patrol. At 16:30 local time on 22 January 1942 while in the Indian Ocean 550 nautical miles (1,020 km; 630 mi) west of Sibolga, Sumatra, she fired two torpedoes at the Dutch 4,482-gross register ton Koninklijke Paketvaart-Maatschappij merchant ship Van Overstraten, which was on a voyage from Bombay, India, to Oosthaven, Sumatra. After one torpedo passed ahead of Van Overstraten and one passed under her keel, leaving her undamaged, I-64 surfaced and opened fire on Van Overstraten with her deck gun. She scored a number of hits, slowing Van Overstraten and killing four members of her crew. Van Overstraten stopped and her surviving crew abandoned ship in her lifeboats. After waiting for the boats to pull away to a safe distance, I-64 hit Van Overstraten with a torpedo shortly before sunset, and Van Overstraten sank by the bow at 01°40′N 090°13′E. There were 113 survivors.

At 05:47 GMT on 28 January 1942, I-64 surfaced in the Palk Strait north of Ceylon and opened fire with her deck gun on the 391-gross register ton British Inland Water Transport paddle steamer Idar, which was steaming from Madras to Cochin, India. After a shell hit Idar, her crew abandoned ship at 05:58 GMT at 10°12′N 080°13′E. I-64 sent a boarding party to Idar to set her on fire, but she survived and later drifted ashore. On 29 January 1942, I-64 torpedoed the American 5,049-gross register ton passenger-cargo steamer Florence Luckenbach — bound from Madras to New York City via Cape Town, South Africa, carrying 3,500 tons of general cargo and 3,400 tons of manganese ore — in the Indian Ocean 15 nautical miles (28 km; 17 mi) southeast of Madras at 10:05. The torpedo hit blew a large hole in Florence Luckenbach′s port side at her No. 1 hold. Ten minutes later, Florence Luckenbach′s entire crew of 38 abandoned ship in her single surviving lifeboat. I-64 waited until the lifeboat and reached a safe distance from Florence Luckenbach and then hit her with a second torpedo, and Florence Luckenbach sank by the bow at 12°55′N 080°33′E.

At 22:33 on 30 January 1942, I-64 torpedoed the British-Indian 2,498-gross register ton merchant steamer Jalatarang — on a voyage from Cochin, India, to Rangoon, Burma, carrying 100 tons of general cargo — in the Bay of Bengal south of Madras, crippling her. I-64 then surfaced and finished off Jalatarang with gunfire, sinking her at 12°59′N 081°00′E. Thirty-eight members of Jalatarang′s crew perished, and 11 eventually were rescued. I-64 was in the Bay of Bengal 50 nautical miles (93 km; 58 mi) south of Madras on 31 January 1942 when she torpedoed the British-Indian 4,215-gross register ton cargo steamer Jalapalaka — steaming in ballast from Bombay to Rangoon — at 13:00 GMT. She then surfaced and sank Jalapalaka with gunfire at 13°00′N 081°08′E. Thirteen members of Jalapalaka′s crew died, and 54 later were rescued. I-64 finished her patrol with her arrival at Penang on 5 February 1942.

==== Third war patrol ====
On 6 March 1942, I-64 set out from Penang to begin her third war patrol, again targeting Allied shipping in the Indian Ocean. While she was at sea, Submarine Division 29 was disbanded on 10 March 1942 and she was reassigned to Submarine Division 30 in Submarine Squadron 5. She was in the Indian Ocean off India′s Coromandel Coast 150 nautical miles (280 km; 170 mi) northeast of Madras when she surfaced at around 12:10 GMT and opened fire with her deck gun on the Norwegian 1,513-gross register ton armed cargo steamer Mabella, which was on a voyage in ballast from Colombo, Ceylon, to Calcutta, India. After I-64 scored 12 hits on Mabella, killing six members of her crew, Mabella′s surviving crew abandoned ship in two lifeboats and a life raft. After waiting for the lifeboats and life raft to reach a safe distance from Mabella, I-64 opened fire on her again with her deck gun, then hit her with a torpedo, sinking her at 14°00′N 081°47′E. On 27 March 1942, I-64 returned to Penang.

==== April–May 1942 ====
On 2 April 1942, I-64 departed Penang bound for Sasebo, where she arrived on 12 April 1942. On 16 May 1942 she departed Sasebo bound for Kwajalein, deploying to support Operation MI, the invasion of Midway Atoll planned for early June 1942.

==== Loss ====
At 18:03 on 17 May 1942, the United States Navy submarine USS Triton (SS-201) sighted I-64 on the surface in the Pacific Ocean 250 nautical miles (460 km; 290 mi) south-southeast of Cape Ashizuri, Shikoku, Japan. At 18:17 Triton fired the last remaining Mark 14 torpedo in her forward torpedo room at I-64 at a range of 6,200 yards (5,670 m). The torpedo struck I-64, the explosion blowing parts of her 100 feet (30 m) into the air. I-64 sank by the stern in two minutes at 29°25′N 134°09′E. Triton′s crew heard a series of 42 smaller explosions beginning at 18:27. At 18:45, Triton′s commanding officer sighted an estimated 30 survivors clinging to wreckage in the water. Ultimately, none of them were rescued.

Unaware of I-64′s loss, the Imperial Japanese Navy renumbered her I-164 on 20 May 1942. On 25 May 1942, it declared her presumed missing in the Pacific Ocean south of Shikoku with the loss of all 81 hands. She was stricken from the Navy list on 10 July 1942.
