= Japanese submarine I-61 =

Japanese submarine

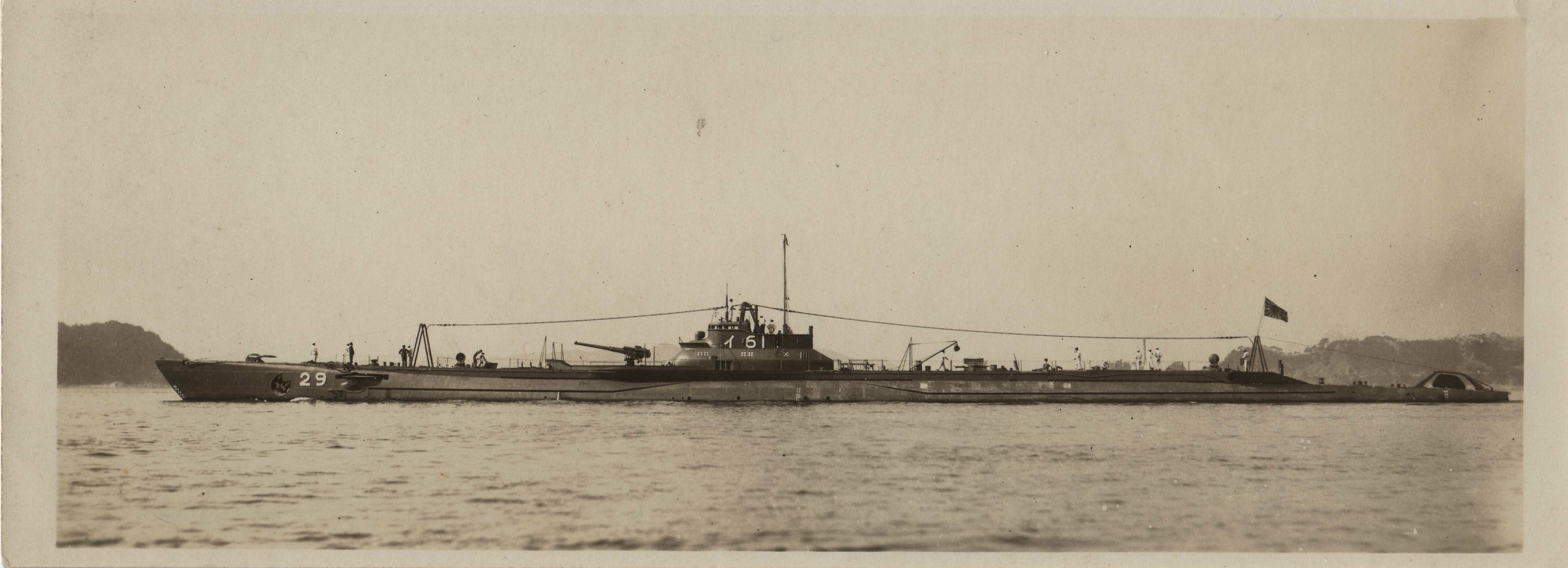

History

Empire of Japan
- Name: I-61
- Builder: Mitsubishi Kobe Yard, Kobe, Japan
- Laid down: 15 November 1926
- Launched: 12 November 1927
- Completed: 6 April 1929
- Commissioned: 6 April 1929
- Decommissioned: 11 January 1932
- Recommissioned: 1 June 1934
- Decommissioned: 15 November 1939 or 20 March 1940
- Recommissioned: 15 April 1940 or 15 November 1940
- Fate: Sunk in collision 2 October 1941; Refloated 20 January 1942 or in February 1942; Scrapped 1942
- Stricken: 1 April 1942

General characteristics
- Class & type: KD4 Type, Kadai type submarine
- Displacement: 1,635 (1,720 maximum) tons surfaced; 2,300 tons submerged
- Length: 97.70 m (320 ft 6 in)
- Beam: 7.80 m (25 ft 7 in)
- Draught: 4.83 m (15 ft 10 in)
- Propulsion: Surface: 2 x Rauschenbach Mk 2 diesel engines, 6,000 hp (4,474 kW), two shafts, 230 tons fuel; Submerged: Electric motor, 1,800 hp (1,342 kW)
- Speed: 20 knots (37 km/h; 23 mph) diesel; 8.5 knots (15.7 km/h; 9.8 mph) electric
- Range: Surface: 10,800 nmi (20,000 km; 12,400 mi) at 10 knots (19 km/h; 12 mph); Submerged: 60 nmi (110 km; 69 mi) at 3 knots (5.6 km/h; 3.5 mph)
- Test depth: 60 m (197 ft)
- Complement: 58 officers and enlisted
- Armament: 6 x 533 mm (21 in) torpedo tubes (4 bow, 2 stern)/14 x 533 mm (21 in) Type 89 torpedoes; 1 x 120 mm (4.7 in) gun; 1 × 7.7 mm (0.3 in) machine gun

I-61 was a Kaidai-class cruiser submarine of the KD4 sub-class built for the Imperial Japanese Navy (IJN) during the 1920s. She sank in an October 1941 collision, just prior to Japan's entry into World War II.

== Construction and commissioning ==
The first unit of the KD4 sub-class, I-61 was built by Mitsubishi at Kobe, Japan. Her keel was laid on 15 November 1926 and she was launched on 12 November 1927. She was completed on 6 April 1929.

== Service history ==
Upon completion, I-61 was assigned to the Sasebo Naval District. On 24 April 1929, she and her sister ship, the submarine I-62, combined to form Submarine Division 29, in which I-61 spent her entire career. The division was attached to the Sasebo Naval District.

Submarine Division 29 was reassigned to Submarine Squadron 1 in the 1st Fleet in the Combined Fleet on 1 December 1930. I-61 apparently was decommissioned and placed in reserve on 11 January 1932, and was transferred to the Sasebo Defense Division in the Sasebo Naval District on 10 November 1932, and then to Submarine Squadron 2 in the 2nd Fleet in the Combined Fleet on 15 November 1933. She was recommissioned on 1 June 1934. On 27 September 1934, she departed Ryojun, Manchukuo, in company with I-62 and the submarines I-56, I-57, I-58, I-64, I-65, I-66, and I-67 for a training cruise off Qingdao, China. The nine submarines completed the cruise with their arrival at Sasebo on 5 October 1934.

On 7 February 1935, I-61 departed Sasebo in company with the other eight submarines of Submarine Squadron 2 — I-53, I-54, I-55, I-59, I-60, I-62, I-63, and I-64 — for a training cruise in the Kuril Islands. The cruise concluded with their arrival at Sukumo Bay on 25 February 1935. The nine submarines departed Sasebo on 29 March 1935 to train in Chinese waters, returning to Sasebo on 4 April 1935. On 15 November 1935, Submarine Division 29 was reassigned to the Sasebo Defense Squadron in the Sasebo Naval District.

On 1 December 1936, I-61 again was assigned to Submarine Squadron 2 in the 2nd Fleet, and on 15 December 1938 she was reassigned to the Submarine School at Kure. On 11 March 1939, I-61 suffered damage in a collision with the Japanese destroyer Yakaze off Mitajiri, Japan. Her Submarine School service ended when she was decommissioned and transferred to the Third Reserve in the Sasebo Naval District; sources claim that this took place both on 15 November 1939 and on 20 March 1940.

On either 15 April 1940 or 15 November 1940, I-61 was recommissioned, and on 15 November 1940 she was reassigned to Submarine Squadron 5 in the Combined Fleet. On 8 January 1941, she collided with the gunboat Kōshū Maru south of Cape Ashizuki, Japan.

=== Loss ===
On 2 October 1941, with the commander of Submarine Division 29 on board, I-61 departed Sasebo with the submarine tender Rio de Janeiro Maru bound for a fleet gathering point at Murokusumi in Yamaguchi Prefecture. In the Koshiki Channel that evening, the Japanese gunboat Kiso Maru mistook a red light she saw I-61 displaying aft of Rio de Janeiro Maru for that of a smaller vessel and misjudged her passing distance behind I-61. She collided with I-61 around 23:21. I-61 sank quickly, with the loss of all 71 men on board.

On 20 January 1942 or in February 1942, I-61′s wreck was refloated, and it was sold for scrapping in 1942. I-61 was struck from the naval register on 1 April 1942.
