= Japanese submarine I-60 =

Ship of the Imperial Japanese Navy

- I-60 off the Xiamen coast, 20 October 1938

History

Imperial Japanese Navy
- Name: I-60
- Builder: Sasebo Naval Arsenal, Sasebo, Japan
- Laid down: 10 October 1927
- Launched: 24 April 1929
- Completed: 20 or 24 December 1929 (see text)
- Commissioned: 24 December 1929
- Decommissioned: 15 November 1933
- Recommissioned: ca. 1934
- Decommissioned: Second half of 1936
- Recommissioned: 1 December 1936
- Fate: Sunk 17 January 1942
- Stricken: 10 March 1942

General characteristics
- Class & type: Kaidai-class submarine (KD3B Type)
- Displacement: 1,829 t (1,800 long tons) surfaced; 2,337 t (2,300 long tons) submerged
- Length: 101 m (331 ft 4 in)
- Beam: 8 m (26 ft 3 in)
- Draft: 4.9 m (16 ft 1 in)
- Installed power: 6,800 bhp (5,100 kW) (diesels); 1,800 hp (1,300 kW) (electric motors)
- Propulsion: Diesel-electric; 2 × diesel engines; 2 × electric motors
- Speed: 20 knots (37 km/h; 23 mph) surfaced; 8 knots (15 km/h; 9.2 mph) submerged
- Range: 10,000 nmi (19,000 km; 12,000 mi) at 10 knots (19 km/h; 12 mph) surfaced; 90 nmi (170 km; 100 mi) at 3 knots (5.6 km/h; 3.5 mph) submerged
- Test depth: 60 m (200 ft)
- Complement: 60
- Armament: 8 × 533 mm (21 in) torpedo tubes (6 bow, 2 stern); 1 × 120 mm (4.7 in) deck gun

I-60 was an Imperial Japanese Navy Kaidai-class cruiser submarine of the KD3B sub-class commissioned in 1928. In 1939, she was involved in a collision that sank her sister ship I-63. She served in World War II, supporting Japanese forces during the Dutch East Indies campaign in early 1942 until she was sunk by a British destroyer on 17 January 1942 during her first war patrol.

== Design and description ==
The submarines of the KD3B sub-class were essentially repeats of the preceding KD3A sub-class with minor modifications to improve seakeeping. They displaced 1,829 metric tons (1,800 long tons) surfaced and 2,337 metric tons (2,300 long tons) submerged. The submarines were 101 meters (331 ft 4 in) long and had a beam of 8 meters (26 ft 3 in) and a draft of 4.9 meters (16 ft 1 in). They had a diving depth of 60 meters (197 ft) and a complement of 60 officers and crewmen.

For surface running, the submarines were powered by two 3,400-brake-horsepower (2,535 kW) diesel engines, each driving one propeller shaft. When submerged each propeller was driven by a 900-horsepower (671 kW) electric motor. They could reach 20 knots (37 km/h; 23 mph) on the surface and 8 knots (15 km/h; 9.2 mph) submerged. On the surface, the KD3Bs had a range of 10,000 nautical miles (19,000 km; 12,000 mi) at 10 knots (19 km/h; 12 mph); submerged, they had a range of 90 nmi (170 km; 100 mi) at 3 knots (5.6 km/h; 3.5 mph).

The submarines were armed with eight internal 53.3 cm (21.0 in) torpedo tubes, six in the bow and two in the stern. They carried one reload for each tube for a total of 16 torpedoes. The submarines were also armed with one 120 mm (4.7 in) deck gun.

== Construction and commissioning ==
I-60 was built by the Sasebo Naval Arsenal at Sasebo, Japan. Her keel was laid on 10 October 1927 and she was launched on 24 April 1929. She was completed and commissioned on either 20 or 24 December 1929, according to various sources.

== Service history ==
=== Pre-World War II ===
==== 1929–1938 ====
On the day of her commissioning, I-60 was attached to the Sasebo Naval District and she and her sister ship I-63 were assigned to Submarine Division 28, which was activated the same day. Sources differ on whether Submarine Division 28 immediately was assigned to Submarine Squadron 2 in the 2nd Fleet, a component of the Combined Fleet, or was assigned directly to the Sasebo Naval District at first and then assigned to Submarine Squadron 2 on 1 December 1930.

On 1 December 1932, Submarine Division 28 was reassigned to Submarine Squadron 1 in the 1st Fleet, also a component of the Combined Fleet. The division was reassigned to the Sasebo Defense Division in the Sasebo Naval District on 15 November 1933, and that day I-60 was decommissioned and placed in reserve. While she was in reserve, the division was reassigned to the Sasebo Guard Squadron in the Sasebo Naval District on 11 December 1933.

Submarine Division 28 returned to duty in Submarine Squadron 2 in the 2nd Fleet on 15 November 1934. Apparently recommissioning in 1934, I-60 got underway from Sasebo on 7 February 1935 along with the other eight submarines of Submarine Squadron 2 — I-53, I-54, I-55, I-59, I-61, I-62, I-63, and I-64 — for a training cruise in the Kuril Islands. The cruise concluded with their arrival at Sukumo Bay on 25 February 1935. The nine submarines departed Sasebo on 29 March 1935 to train in Chinese waters, returning to Sasebo on 4 April 1935. I-60 was anchored in the Terashima Strait with I-59 and I-63 on 22 July 1936 during fleet exercises when large waves swamped her, causing minor damage to her superstructure and carrying away her starboard anchor chain and 5-meter (16 ft 5 in) work boat. She apparently was out of commission later in 1936.

I-60 recommissioned on 1 December 1936 while Submarine Division 28 was still operating in the 1st Fleet as part of Submarine Squadron 1. On 27 March 1937, she put to sea from Sasebo with I-59 and I-63 for a training cruise in the vicinity of Qingdao, China. They concluded it with their arrival at Ariake Bay on 6 April 1937. Submarine Division 28 was reassigned to the Sasebo Defense Squadron in the Sasebo Naval District on 1 December 1937, but returned to duty with Submarine Squadron 1 in the 1st Fleet on 15 December 1938.

==== Collision with I-63 ====
In January 1939, I-60 and the other submarines of Submarine Squadron 1 got underway for fleet exercises. Early on the morning of 2 February 1939, the submarines were on their way to their assigned stations for a simulated attack against Japanese surface ships also taking part in the exercises. I-60′s division mate I-63 arrived at her station in the Bungo Strait off Kyushu about 60 nautical miles (110 km; 69 mi) northwest of Mizunokojima Lighthouse and at 04:30 shut down her diesel engines and hove to to await sunrise on the surface with all of her running lights on.

I-60, proceeding on the surface at 12 knots (22 km/h; 14 mph) toward her own assigned station, mistakenly entered I-63′s assigned area due to a navigation error. At around 05:00 I-60′s watch officer sighted two white lights belonging to I-63. I-60′s lookouts misidentified I-63′s lights as those of two fishing boats in close proximity to one another. I-60′s watch officer decided to pass between the supposed fishing boats, unwittingly putting I-60 on a collision course with I-63. By the time I-60′s watch officer realized the lights belonged to I-63, the two submarines were only 220 yards (200 m) apart. He ordered I-60 to turn in the hope of avoiding a collision. Meanwhile, I-63′s crew called her commanding officer to her bridge, which he reached in time to see that I-60 was about to ram his submarine. He issued a command for I-63 to go to all ahead full and ordered her crew to close all watertight doors.

By the time the two submarines sighted each other, it was too late to avoid a collision, and I-60 rammed I-63. The impact tore open I-63′s starboard ballast tank and auxiliary machinery compartment. I-63 sank in a few minutes in 320 feet (98 m) of water with the loss of 81 members of her crew. I-60, which had suffered a crushed bow buoyancy tank, rescued I-63′s commanding officer and six other crewmen. They were I-63′s only survivors.

As the result of the post-accident investigation, a court of inquiry found that I-60′s navigation error had contributed to the accident and that I-60 had unsatisfactory lookout procedures and inadequate management of her watch officers. Although off the bridge and below at the time of the collision, I-60′s commanding officer took full responsibility for the accident. After a trial by court-martial, he was suspended from duty, and his later promotion from lieutenant commander to commander was delayed.

==== 1939–1941 ====
On 15 November 1939, Submarine Division 28 was attached to the Sasebo Naval District and transferred to duty at the submarine school at Kure, Japan. On 15 November 1940, the division was reassigned to Submarine Squadron 5 in the Combined Fleet. I-60 temporarily relieved I-59 as division flagship from 6 to 29 January 1941.

I-60 was placed in Third Reserve at Sasebo on 10 April 1941 and later moved to the Tama Zosensho shipyard at Tamano, Japan, for a refit and modernization. She became the flagship of Submarine Division 28 again on 20 May 1941, serving as such until 3 December 1941, when I-59 relieved her.

=== World War II ===
==== December 1941–January 1942 ====
Nominally assigned to the Malaya Invasion Force for the Pacific campaign of World War II, I-60 still was undergoing modernization at Tamano when the war in the Pacific began with the Japanese attack on Pearl Harbor, Hawaii, on 7 December 1941 (8 December on the other side of the International Date Line in Japan). On 26 December 1941, she was reassigned to Submarine Unit B, tasked to operate in the Indian Ocean. With the commander of Submarine Division 28 aboard, she got underway from Kobe, Japan, on 31 December 1941 in company with I-59, bound for Davao City on Mindanao in the Philippines. The two submarines arrived at Davao on 5 January 1942 and refueled there. While at Davao, I-60 again became the flagship of Submarine Division 28 on 9 January 1942.

==== First war patrol ====
On 10 January 1942, I-60 departed Davao City in company with I-59 to begin her first war patrol. The two submarines proceeded to the Banda Sea south of the Sunda Islands, off the Celebes in the Netherlands East Indies, and along with the other submarines of Submarine Squadron 5 — I-62, I-64, I-65, and I-66 — covered the Japanese landings at Kema and Manado in northern Celebes, which began on 11 January. On 13 January, I-60 parted company with I-59 and proceeded to a patrol area in the Indian Ocean south of the Sunda Strait between Java and Sumatra, after which she was to proceed to Penang in Japanese-occupied British Malaya. Early on the morning of 16 January 1942, she reported her arrival in her patrol area south of the Sunda Strait, and on the evening of 16 January she transmitted a status report. The Japanese never heard from her again.

==== Loss ====
On 17 January 1942, the Royal Navy destroyer HMS Jupiter was in the Java Sea 25 nautical miles (46 km; 29 mi) north-northwest of the island of Anak Krakatoa in the Sunda Strait escorting the United States Navy troopship USS Mount Vernon (AP-22) on a voyage from Singapore to Aden when she received a distress signal from a nearby merchant ship. Jupiter detached from Mount Vernon and began an asdic search. Two hours later, she gained contact on the submerged I-60 and made two depth charge attacks. Heavily damaged, I-60 surfaced astern of Jupiter, too close for Jupiter to depress her main armament enough to open fire on I-60.

Unable to submerge, I-60 engaged Jupiter with her 120-millimeter (4.7 in) deck gun. Jupiter changed course and opened fire on I-60 with her starboard Oerlikon 20-millimeter antiaircraft gun, killing and wounding I-60 crewmen who emerged from her conning tower to man her deck gun. Despite this, I-60′s crew kept emerging on deck to replace fallen gunners, and I-60 managed to fire seven or eight rounds a minute, one of which knocked out Jupiter′s open-backed "A" 4.7-inch (120 mm) twin gun turret, killing three men and wounding nine. British records subsequently stated that "The enemy submarine was fought with great determination, her gun′s crews being continually reinforced from inside the submarine until put out of action."

Jupiter fired two torpedoes at I-60, both of which missed, then opened fire on I-60 with her remaining four 4.7-inch (120 mm) guns, scoring two or three hits. With her deck gun no longer manned, I-60 took on a list as smoke poured from her. Her 7.7-millimeter machine gun continued to fire from her conning tower at Jupiter, which closed with I-60 at high speed and silenced the machine gun with 20-millimeter fire. Jupiter hit I-60 with a 4.7-inch (120 mm) round between her conning tower and stern, causing an internal explosion aboard the submarine. Flame and smoke emerged from the conning tower, which Jupiter′s crew believed was on fire. Jupiter then passed 15 feet (4.6 m) abeam of I-60 and dropped a depth charge set to detonate at a shallow depth. Its explosion blew a Japanese sailor out of I-60′s conning tower and caused flames to rise 15 to 20 feet (4.6 to 6.1 m) from it. I-60 sank by the stern in 3,000 feet (914 m) of water at the southern entrance to the Sunda Strait at 06°19′30″S 104°49′20″E.

Jupiter picked up only three survivors, one of whom later died; 84 or 86 members of I-60′s crew were lost, according to different sources. The Japanese struck I-60 from the navy list on 10 March 1942.
