= Japanese submarine I-67 =

Submarine

- I-67 off Kobe upon commissioning, 8 August 1932

History

Empire of Japan
- Name: I-67
- Builder: Mitsubishi, Kobe, Japan
- Laid down: 14 October 1929
- Launched: 7 April 1931
- Completed: 8 August 1932
- Commissioned: 8 August 1932
- Decommissioned: 1 December 1937
- Recommissioned: 15 November 1939
- Fate: Sank 29 August 1940
- Stricken: 1 November 1940

General characteristics
- Class & type: Kaidai-class submarine (KD5 Type)
- Displacement: 1,732 tonnes (1,705 long tons) surfaced; 2,367 tonnes (2,330 long tons) submerged
- Length: 97.7 m (320 ft 6 in)
- Beam: 8.2 m (26 ft 11 in)
- Draft: 4.7 m (15 ft 5 in)
- Installed power: 6,000 bhp (4,500 kW) (diesels); 1,800 hp (1,300 kW) (electric motors)
- Propulsion: Diesel-electric; 2 × diesel engines; 2 × electric motors
- Speed: 20 knots (37 km/h; 23 mph) surfaced; 8.25 knots (15.28 km/h; 9.49 mph) submerged
- Range: 10,800 nmi (20,000 km; 12,400 mi) at 10 knots (19 km/h; 12 mph) surfaced; 60 nmi (110 km; 69 mi) at 3 knots (5.6 km/h; 3.5 mph) submerged
- Test depth: 70 m (230 ft)
- Complement: 75
- Armament: 6 × 533 mm (21 in) torpedo tubes (4 bow, 2 stern); 1 × 120 mm (4.7 in) deck gun; 1 × 13.2 mm (0.52 in) anti-aircraft machinegun

I-67 was a Kaidai-type cruiser submarine of the Imperial Japanese Navy. A KD5 sub-class boat, she sank in a training accident in 1940.

== Design and description ==
The submarines of the KD5 sub-class were improved versions of the preceding KD4 sub-class. They displaced 1,732 tonnes (1,705 long tons) surfaced and 2,367 tonnes (2,330 long tons) submerged. The submarines were 97.7 meters (320 ft 6 in) long, had a beam of 8.2 meters (26 ft 11 in) and a draft of 4.7 meters (15 ft 5 in). The boats had a diving depth of 75 m (246 ft)

For surface running, the boats were powered by two 3,400-brake-horsepower (2,535 kW) diesel engines, each driving one propeller shaft. When submerged each propeller was driven by a 900-horsepower (671 kW) electric motor. They could reach 20 knots (37 km/h; 23 mph) on the surface and 8 knots (15 km/h; 9.2 mph) underwater. On the surface, the KD5s had a range of 10,800 nautical miles (20,000 km; 12,400 mi) at 10 knots (19 km/h; 12 mph); submerged, they had a range of 60 nmi (110 km; 69 mi) at 3 knots (5.6 km/h; 3.5 mph).

The boats were armed with six internal 53.3 cm (21.0 in) torpedo tubes, four in the bow and two in the stern. They carried a total of 14 torpedoes. They were also armed with one 100 mm (3.9 in) deck gun for combat on the surface, as well as a 13.2 mm (0.52 in) anti-aircraft machinegun.

== Construction and commissioning ==
I-67 was built by Mitsubishi at Kobe, Japan. Her keel was laid on 14 October 1929 and she was launched on 7 April 1931. She was completed and commissioned on 8 August 1932.

== Service history ==
Upon commissioning, I-67 was attached to the Kure Naval District and assigned to Submarine Division 30, in which she spent her entire career. When the submarine I-66 was commissioned on 10 November 1932, she joined I-67 in Submarine Division 30, and that day the division was reassigned to the Sasebo Defense Division in the Sasebo Naval District. The submarine I-65 joined I-66 and I-67 in Submarine Division 30 on 1 December 1932, and that day the division was reassigned to Submarine Squadron 1 in the 1st Fleet in the Combined Fleet.

Submarine Division 30 was reassigned to Submarine Squadron 2 in the 2nd Fleet in the Combined Fleet on 15 November 1933. On 27 September 1934, I-67 departed Ryojun, Manchukuo, in company with the submarines I-56, I-57, I-58, I-61, I-62, I-64, I-65, and I-66 to conduct a training cruise in the Qingdao area off China. The nine submarines completed the cruise with their arrival at Sasebo on 5 October 1934.

Submarine Division 30 was reassigned to the Sasebo Guard Squadron in the Sasebo Naval District on 15 November 1934, and again to Submarine Squadron 2 in the 2nd Fleet on 15 November 1935. On 13 April 1936, I-67 got underway in company with I-65 and I-66 from Fukuoka, Japan, for a training cruise that took them to the Qingdao area. The three submarines completed the cruise with their arrival at Sasebo on 22 April 1936. The three submarines put to sea from Mako in the Pescadores Islands on 4 August 1936 for a training cruise off Amoy, China. They returned to Mako on 6 September 1936.

I-67 was decommissioned and placed in reserve in the Sasebo Naval District on 1 December 1937 and shifted to Third Reserve in that district on 15 December 1938. She was recommissioned as a unit of Submarine Division 30 on 15 November 1939 and assigned to Submarine Squadron 4 in the 1st Fleet in the Combined Fleet.

=== Loss ===
In August 1940, I-67 deployed to the Bonin Islands to take part in a Combined Fleet exercise with the commander of Submarine Division 30 and an exercise judge on board in addition to her crew of 89. She was in the Pacific Ocean off the southern coast of Minamitorishima on 29 August 1940 when a seaplane from the seaplane carrier Mizuho approached. I-67 practiced a crash dive to avoid a mock attack by the plane. She never resurfaced, and sank with the loss of all 91 men on board. On 25 September 1940, the Imperial Japanese Navy officially declared all on board to be dead, and I-67 was stricken from the Navy list on 1 November 1940.

The cause of I-67′s loss remains unknown. During the post-accident investigation, the crew of Mizuho′s seaplane said they believed that they saw I-67 submerge with a rear hatch still open. Investigators concluded that if she had submerged with the hatch open, rapid flooding would have occurred and caused her to sink quickly by the stern.
