= Japanese submarine I-158 =

Imperial Japanese Navy Kaidai-class cruiser submarine of the KD3A sub-class

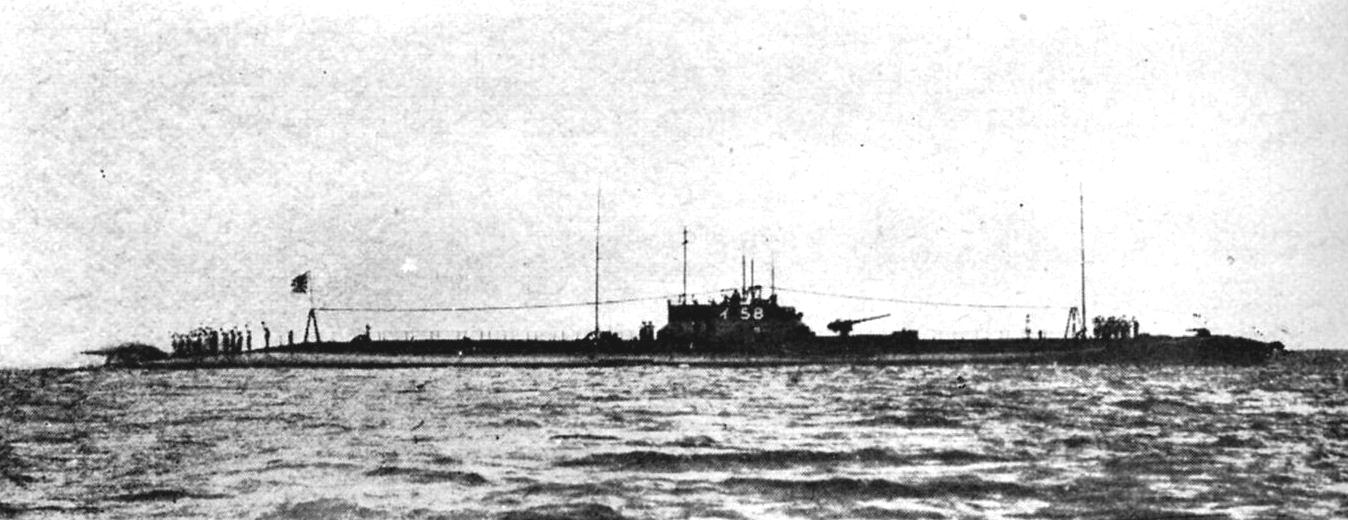
- I-58 at sea

History

Empire of Japan
- Name: I-58
- Builder: Yokosuka Naval Arsenal, Yokosuka, Japan
- Laid down: 3 December 1924
- Launched: 3 October 1925
- Completed: 15 May 1928
- Commissioned: 15 May 1928
- Fate: Surrendered 2 September 1945; Stricken 30 November 1945; Scuttled 1 April 1946

General characteristics
- Class & type: Kaidai-class submarine (KD3A Type)
- Displacement: 1,829 t (1,800 long tons) surfaced; 2,337 t (2,300 long tons) submerged
- Length: 100 m (328 ft 1 in)
- Beam: 8 m (26 ft 3 in)
- Draft: 4.82 m (15 ft 10 in)
- Installed power: 6,800 bhp (5,100 kW) (diesels); 1,800 hp (1,300 kW) (electric motors)
- Propulsion: Diesel-electric; 2 × diesel engines; 2 × electric motors
- Speed: 20 knots (37 km/h; 23 mph) surfaced; 8 knots (15 km/h; 9.2 mph) submerged
- Range: 10,000 nmi (19,000 km; 12,000 mi) at 10 knots (19 km/h; 12 mph) surfaced; 90 nmi (170 km; 100 mi) at 3 knots (5.6 km/h; 3.5 mph) submerged
- Test depth: 60 m (197 ft)
- Complement: 60
- Armament: 8 × 533 mm (21 in) torpedo tubes (6 bow, 2 stern); 1 × 120 mm (4.7 in) deck gun

I-58, later I-158, was an Imperial Japanese Navy Kaidai-class cruiser submarine of the KD3A sub-class commissioned in 1928. During World War II, she supported Japanese forces during the invasion of Malaya in December 1941 and was instrumental in tracking Force Z, the two British capital ships that attempted to intercept the Japanese invasion forces, so they could be sunk by torpedo bombers. She sank four Dutch merchant ships in early 1942 during the Dutch East Indies campaign and then was transferred to the Central Pacific in May 1942 to support the fleet during the Battle of Midway in early June 1942. Upon her return to Japan in July 1942, she became a training ship until early 1945 when she was modified to serve as a carrier for kaiten manned suicide attack torpedoes. She surrendered to the Allies at the end of the war and was scuttled in 1946.

== Design and description ==
The submarines of the KD3A sub-class were the first Japanese-designed cruiser submarines, based on experience with earlier designs based on British and German cruiser submarines. They displaced 1,829 metric tons (1,800 long tons) surfaced and 2,337 metric tons (2,300 long tons) submerged. They were 100 meters (328 ft 1 in) long and had a beam of 8 meters (26 ft 3 in) and a draft of 4.82 meters (15 ft 10 in). They had a diving depth of 60 m (197 ft) and a complement of 60 officers and crewmen.

For surface running, the submarines were powered by two 3,400-brake-horsepower (2,535 kW) diesel engines, each driving one propeller shaft. When they were submerged, a 900-horsepower (671 kW) electric motor drive each propeller. They could reach 20 knots (37 km/h; 23 mph) on the surface and 8 knots (15 km/h; 9.2 mph) submerged. On the surface, the KD3As had a range of 10,000 nautical miles (19,000 km; 12,000 mi) at 10 knots (19 km/h; 12 mph); submerged, they had a range of 90 nmi (170 km; 100 mi) at 3 knots (5.6 km/h; 3.5 mph).

The submarines had eight internal 53.3 cm (21 in) torpedo tubes, six in the bow and two in the stern. They carried one reload for each tube for a total of 16 torpedoes. They also had one 120 mm (4.7 in) deck gun.

== Construction and commissioning ==
Built by the Yokosuka Naval Arsenal at Yokosuka, Japan, I-58 was laid down on 3 December 1924. She was launched on 3 October 1925 and completed and commissioned on 15 May 1928.

== Service history ==
=== Pre-World War II ===
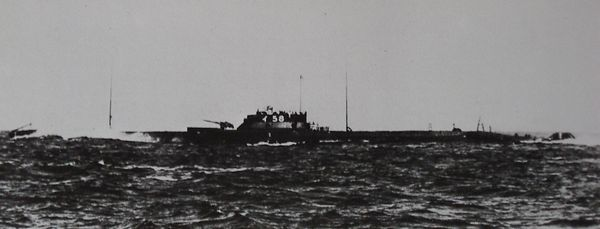
I-58 at sea, 1927

On the day of her commissioning, I-58 was attached to the Kure Naval District. On 1 April 1929, the new Submarine Division 19 was activated in Submarine Squadron 2 in the 2nd Fleet, a component of the Combined Fleet, and she was assigned to the new division that day. The division was reassigned to the Kure Defense Division in the Kure Naval District on 1 December 1931, but it returned to Submarine Squadron 2 in the 2nd Fleet on 20 May 1932. I-58 was placed in reserve at Kure, Japan, on 1 June 1932.

I-58 returned to active service on 1 December 1932. She got underway from Sasebo, Japan, on 29 June 1933 with the other submarines of her squadron — I-53, I-54 and I-55 of Submarine Division 18 and Submarine Division 19′s I-56 and I-57 — for a training cruise off China and Mako in the Pescadores Islands, which the submarines concluded with their arrival at Takao, Formosa, on 5 July 1933. They departed Takao on 13 July 1933 and again trained in Chinese waters before arriving in Tokyo Bay on 21 August 1933. On 25 August 1933, all six submarines took part in a fleet review at Yokohama, Japan. I-58 was placed in reserve at Kure again on 1 November 1933.

I-58 apparently was back in service in time to depart Ryojun, Manchukuo, in company with I-56, I-57, and the submarines I-61, I-62, I-64, I-65, I-66, and I-67 for a training cruise off Qingdao, China, which the nine submarines concluded with their arrival at Sasebo on 5 October 1934. She apparently again went into reserve at Kure sometime after completing this cruise. Meanwhile, Submarine Division 19 was reassigned to the Kure Guard Squadron in the Kure Naval District on 15 November 1934 and to Submarine Division 1 in the 1st Fleet, a component of the Combined Fleet, on 15 November 1935.

I-58 returned to active service on 1 December 1936, and that day Submarine Division 19 was reassigned to the Kure Naval District. The division was placed in the First Reserve in the district on 7 January 1937, but returned to active service in the district on 1 January 1938. The division was placed in Third Reserve in the district on 15 December 1938.

Submarine Division 19 returned to active service on 15 November 1939 with its assignment to Submarine Squadron 4 in the 1st Fleet. Tragedy struck while I-58 was on night maneuvers south of Tokyo Bay on 26 August 1940, taking part in simulated attacks against Combined Fleet capital ships with her ballast tanks partially flooded. She began a crash-dive after completing her final simulated attack, but her bridge party did not clear the bridge quickly enough as she submerged. The last man on the bridge, Signalman Hirose Masao, realized that I-58 was in danger of submerging with her bridge hatch open and flooding, so he closed the hatch from the outside and drowned when I-58 submerged. Submarine Squadron 4 was assigned directly to the Combined Fleet on 15 November 1940.

Lieutenant Commander Soshichi Kitamura (北村 惣七, Kitamura Soshichi) took command of I-58 on 31 October 1941. As the Japanese armed forces mobilized for an offensive against Allied forces that would begin the Pacific campaign of World War II, I-58 departed Kure, Japan, on 20 November 1941 bound for Samah on China′s Hainan Island, which she reached on 26 November 1941. She departed Samah on 1 December 1941 to support the offensive. Tasked with supporting Operation E, the Japanese invasion of British Malaya, I-58 proceeded to her patrol area in the South China Sea off the Malayan Peninsula.

=== World War II ===
==== First war patrol ====
Hostilities began in East Asia on 8 December 1941 (7 December across the International Date Line in Hawaii, where Japan began the war with its attack on Pearl Harbor). The Japanese invasion of British Malaya began that day, and I-57, I-58, and the submarines I-62, I-64, and I-66 formed a patrol line in the South China Sea off Trengganu, British Malaya.

On 9 December 1941, the Japanese submarine I-65 spotted Force Z – a Royal Navy force consisting of the battleship Prince of Wales, the battlecruiser Repulse, and four destroyers – headed north-northwest and posing a threat to Japanese invasion convoys. I-58 was operating to the north of I-65, but she received an inaccurate position report for Force Z because of faulty communications. Shortly after midnight on 10 December 1941, however, I-58 was running on the surface in the South China Sea 140 nautical miles (260 km; 160 mi) east of Kuantan, British Malaya, when her lookouts spotted Force Z only 660 yards (600 m) off her port bow, with Prince of Wales in the lead. I-58 crash-dived and attempted to fire a full six-torpedo salvo from her bow torpedo tubes at Prince of Wales in what would have been the first attack on an enemy battleship in history by an Imperial Japanese Navy submarine, but the first torpedo tube's outer door jammed, spoiling the attack. She fired her other five bow torpedoes at Repulse, but they all missed. She transmitted a report that Force Z was proceeding south-southwest at 24 knots (44 km/h; 28 mph) and continued to track the British ships. The light cruiser Sendai received her report and relayed it to the heavy cruiser Chōkai, flagship of Vice Admiral Jisaburō Ozawa, Commander-in-Chief of the Imperial Japanese Navy′s 1st Southern Expeditionary Fleet. At 06:15 on 10 December 1941, I-58 lost contact with Force Z, but torpedo bombers of the Imperial Japanese Navy′s 22nd Air Flotilla flying from bases in Japanese-occupied French Indochina sank both Prince of Wales and Repulse in the South China Sea that afternoon. I-58 concluded her patrol with her arrival at Cam Ranh Bay in French Indochina on 20 December 1941.

==== Second war patrol ====
I-58 departed Cam Ranh Bay on 28 December 1941 in company with I-56 to begin her second war patrol, assigned a patrol area in the Netherlands East Indies off Surabaya, Java. In the Java Sea northwest of Bawean Island at 01:45 on 3 January 1942, I-58 hit the Dutch 7,395-gross register ton merchant ship SS Langkoeas – which had departed Surabaya on 1 January 1942 bound for Haifa in Mandatory Palestine with a cargo of sugar – with one torpedo in her engine room, killing 12 men there, then sank her with gunfire at 05°S 112°E. One of Langkoeas′s lifeboats was destroyed by I-58′s gunfire before it could be launched, but her surviving crew of 79 men abandoned ship in her other three whaleboats, one of which accidentally was dropped into the sea from a height of 20 feet (6.1 m), swamping it and casting many of its occupants overboard. As another lifeboat with Langkoeas′s master aboard neared the swamped lifeboat to render it assistance, I-58 approached at speed on the surface. Many of the men in boats stood and cheered her approach, thinking that she offered them rescue, but when I-58 had closed to 220 yards (200 m), her crew opened fire on two of the boats with machine guns. I-58 then closed to 110 yards (100 m) of the swamped lifeboat and machine-gunned it as well. Seventy-nine men died in the machine-gunning of the three lifeboats, but I-58′s crew pulled three survivors from the water, one of whom had clung to one of the submarine′s diving planes. I-58′s crew threatened them with a revolver, slapped and pushed them, and slashed one with a sword. Kitamura then interrogated them in broken English, demanding information on Langkoeas′s identity, departure port, cargo, and destination and on secret Allied codes and signals, threatening them with punishment after each question if they withheld information. After Kitamura became enraged when he discovered that they had no code or signal information, I-58′s crew threw them back into the sea, where they spent the night floating in their kapok life jackets before discovering and boarding an empty life raft on the morning of 3 January. On 7 January 1942, they drifted ashore on Bawean, where local fishermen found them and summoned help. They were driven to Bawean's capital Sangkapoera, from which a Netherlands Naval Aviation Service Catalina flying boat flew them to Java – Batavia or Surabaya, according to different sources – where they were hospitalized.

Early on the morning of 5 January 1942, an unidentified submarine fired a torpedo at I-58 while she was on the surface, but I-58 avoided damage when the torpedo merely grazed her side. On 9 January 1942, I-58 opened gunfire on the Dutch 2,380-gross register ton merchant ship SS Camphuys, then torpedoed and sank her in the Java Sea west of Bawean Island at 04°30′S 111°47′E. The United States Navy destroyer USS Paul Jones (DD-230) rescued Camphuys′s survivors. I-58 returned to Cam Ranh Bay on 16 January 1942.

==== Third war patrol ====
I-58 began her third war patrol on 7 February 1942, getting underway from Cam Ranh Bay to head for a patrol area in the Indian Ocean south of Java. She transited the Lombok Strait between Bali and Lombok and entered the Indian Ocean on 20 February. While operating south of Tjilatjap, Java, on 22 February, she attacked the Dutch 2,982-gross register ton passenger ship SS Pijnacker Hordijk with gunfire, then torpedoed and sank her; her crew briefly questioned Pijnacker Hordijk′s master before releasing him.

On 25 February 1942, I-58 attacked the Dutch 7,135-gross register ton merchant ship SS Boeroe — making a voyage to Perth, Australia — in the Indian Ocean south of the Sunda Strait, opening gunfire on her at 10:15. After she had fired a few rounds, she submerged when a Royal Netherlands Navy destroyer escorting two oilers happened upon the scene, but at 11:30 she fired two torpedoes at Boeroe. Both hit, and Boeroe sank slowly. According to various sources, her entire crew of 70 survived and escaped, but one source claims that all on board died in the sinking and suggests that those who survived the sinking itself may have been massacred by I-58′s crew.

On 28 February 1942, I-58 torpedoed the British 6,735-gross register ton tanker SS British Judge in the Indian Ocean 10 nautical miles (19 km; 12 mi) south of the Sunda Strait at "06°S 105°E. The damaged British Judge survived the attack. I-58 concluded her patrol with her arrival at Staring Bay on the coast of Celebes on 8 March 1942.

==== March–May 1942 ====
Submarine Squadron 4 was disbanded on 10 March 1942, and the submarines of Submarine Division 19 – I-56, I-57, and I-58 – were reassigned to Submarine Squadron 5. I-58 departed Staring Bay on 13 March 1942 bound for Kure, Japan, where she arrived on 20 March 1942 for repairs. With them complete, she got back underway from Kure on 14 May 1942 and set course for Kwajalein Atoll. During her voyage, she was renumbered I-158 on 20 May 1942. She arrived at Kwajalein on 24 May 1942.

==== Fourth war patrol: The Battle of Midway ====
On 26 May 1942, I-158 departed Kwajalein to conduct her fourth war patrol, operating in support of Operation MI, the planned Japanese invasion of Midway Atoll in the Northwestern Hawaiian Islands, in which Submarine Squadron 5 formed part of the Advance Expeditionary Force. She operated in a patrol line between 28°20′N 162°20′W and 26°00′N 165°00′W which also included the submarines I-156, I-157, I-159, I-162, I-165, and I-166. The Japanese suffered a decisive defeat on 4 June 1942 during the Battle of Midway, and that day the commander-in-chief of the 6th Fleet, Vice Admiral Teruhisa Komatsu, ordered the 15 submarines in the Japanese submarine patrol line to move westward.

After the commander-in-chief of the Combined Fleet, Admiral Isoroku Yamamoto, ordered Komatsu to interpose his submarines between the retreating Japanese fleet and the opposing United States Navy aircraft carriers, the Japanese submarines, including I-158, began a gradual movement to the north-northwest, moving at 3 knots (5.6 km/h; 3.5 mph) by day and 14 knots (26 km/h; 16 mph) after dark. I-158 made no contact with enemy forces during the battle, and returned to Kwajalein on 19 June 1942.

==== June 1942 – April 1945 ====
On 22 June 1942, I-158 departed Kwajalein bound for Kure, Japan, which she reached on 30 June. On 10 July 1942, Submarine Squadron 5 was disbanded, and Submarine Division 19 – consisting of I-156, I-157, I-158, and I-159 – was reassigned to the Kure Naval District. I-158 assumed duties as a training ship at the Kure Submarine School that day, continuing in that role until March 1945.

Submarine Division 19 was reassigned to the Kure Submarine Squadron on 1 December 1943. During December 1943, I-158 was painted in an experimental light gray camouflage scheme based on that of the German submarine U-511, which Japan had purchased from Germany in 1943 and renamed Ro-500. I-158 participated in the first stage of Submarine School tests of the paint scheme in the Iyo Nada in the Seto Inland Sea on 5 January 1944 to determine its value in the waters around Japan, the effectiveness of the camouflage pattern against detection by surface warships and aircraft, its ability to confuse enemy forces attempting to determine the submarine's course and speed, and the durability of the paint.

On 20 April 1944, I-158 was reassigned to Submarine Division 34 in the 6th Fleet. On 17 March 1945, she suffered minor damage during a United States Army Air Forces Twentieth Air Force B-29 Superfortress raid on the Mitsubishi dockyard at Kobe, Japan.

==== Kaiten carrier ====
While under repair after the air raid, I-158 was equipped with fittings to carry two kaiten manned suicide attack torpedoes. During July 1945, the crews of I-156, I-157, I-158, I-159, and I-162 underwent training in launching kaiten against enemy ships in the event of an invasion of Japan.

==== End of war ====
On 15 August 1945, I-158 was reassigned to Submarine Division 15 in the 6th Fleet. That same day, Emperor Hirohito announced the end of hostilities. I-156 surrendered to the Allies at Kure on 2 September 1945, and on 2 November 1945 the U.S. Navy assigned it to its Submarine Division 1 along with I-162 and the submarines I-201, I-202, and I-203. The Japanese struck her from the navy list on 30 November 1945. She moved to Sasebo and in March 1946 was stripped of all usable equipment. The Commander, Naval Activities, Japan, U.S. Navy Vice Admiral Robert H. Griffin, came aboard I-158 to inspect her in March 1946.

== Disposal ==
On 26 March 1946, the U.S. Navy received orders to sink all captured Japanese submarines. On 1 April 1946, the U.S. Navy submarine tender USS Nereus (AS-17) towed I-158 from Sasebo to an area off the Gotō Islands, where she was one of a number of Japanese submarines scuttled that day in Operation Road's End. She sank at 32°37′N 129°17′E.
