= Japanese submarine I-53 (1925) =

1920s Japanese cruiser submarine

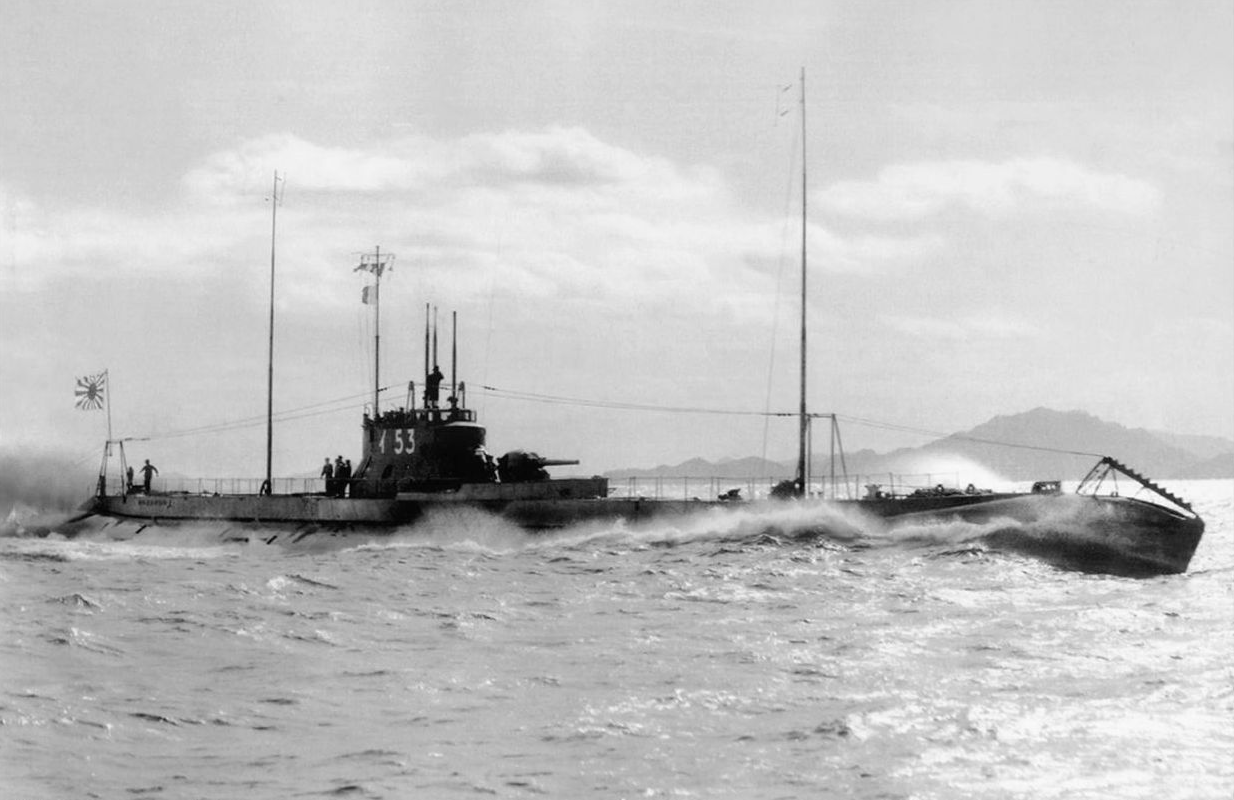
- I-153 on sea trials, 15 March 1927

History

Empire of Japan
- Name: Submarine No. 64
- Builder: Kure Naval Arsenal, Kure, Japan
- Laid down: 1 April 1924
- Renamed: I-53 on 1 November 1924
- Launched: 5 August 1925
- Completed: 30 March 1927
- Commissioned: 30 March 1927
- Renamed: I-153 on 20 May 1942
- Fate: Hulked 31 January 1944; Surrendered 1945; Stricken 30 November 1945; Scuttled 8 May 1946 or scrapped 1948 (see text)

General characteristics
- Class & type: Kaidai-class submarine (KD3A Type)
- Displacement: 1,829 t (1,800 long tons) (surfaced); 2,337 t (2,300 long tons) (submerged)
- Length: 100 m (328 ft 1 in)
- Beam: 8 m (26 ft 3 in)
- Draft: 4.82 m (15 ft 10 in)
- Installed power: 6,800 bhp (5,071 kW) (diesels); 1,800 hp (1,342 kW) (electric motors)
- Propulsion: 2 shafts; Diesel-electric; 2 × diesel engines; 2 × electric motors
- Speed: 20 knots (37 km/h; 23 mph) (surfaced); 8 knots (15 km/h; 9.2 mph) (submerged)
- Range: 10,000 nmi (19,000 km; 12,000 mi) at 10 knots (19 km/h; 12 mph) (surfaced); 90 nmi (170 km; 100 mi) at 3 knots (5.6 km/h; 3.5 mph) (submerged)
- Test depth: 60 m (197 ft)
- Complement: 60
- Armament: 8 × 533 mm (21 in) torpedo tubes (6 bow, 2 stern); 1 × 120 mm (4.7 in) deck gun

I-53, later I-153 (伊号第五三潜水艦, I-gō Dai-Hyaku-gojūsan sensuikan), later I-153, was an Imperial Japanese Navy Kaidai-class cruiser submarine of the KD3A sub-class commissioned in 1927. During World War II, she supported Japanese forces during the invasion of British Malaya in December 1941 and the Dutch East Indies campaign in early 1942. She served as a training submarine until she was hulked in January 1944. She surrendered to the Allies at the end of the war in 1945. She was either scuttled in 1946 or scrapped in 1948.

== Background ==
Following World War I, the Imperial Japanese Navy re-evaluated the use of submarine warfare as an element of fleet strategy due to the successful deployment of long-range cruiser-submarines for commerce raiding by the major combatant navies. Japanese strategists came to realize possibilities for using submarines for long-range reconnaissance and in a war of attrition against an enemy fleet approaching Japan. The Japanese already had built two large, long-range submarines — I-51 and I-52 — under the Eight-six fleet program as prototypes when the arrival on 20 June 1919 of seven German U-boats Japan received as war reparations after the end of World War I led to a complete re-design. The Japanese quickly hired hundreds of German submarine engineers, technicians, and former U-boat officers unemployed after the defeat of the German Empire in World War I, and brought them to Japan under five-year contracts. The United States Navy′s Office of Naval Intelligence estimated that some 800 German advisors had gone to Japan by the end of 1920. The Japanese also sent delegations to postwar Germany, and were active in purchasing many patents.

== Design and description ==
The submarines of the KD3A sub-class were the first mass-produced Japanese-designed fleet submarines. Based largely on the indigenous Kaidai Type II (of which one example, I-52, was constructed) with a strengthened double hull, their design was also influenced by the largest of the German submarines in Japanese hands, U-125.

They displaced 1,829 metric tons (1,800 long tons) surfaced and 2,337 metric tons (2,300 long tons) submerged. The submarines were 100 meters (328 ft 1 in) long, had a beam of 8 meters (26 ft 3 in) and a draft of 4.82 meters (15 ft 10 in). The submarines had a complement of 60 officers and crewmen. The hull had almost the same outer dimensions as I-52′s, but the increased thickness of the inner hull permitted a diving depth of 60 metres (197 ft). Internal volume was slightly increased by making the hull slightly trapezoidal in cross-section at the expense of 300 tons of additional displacement. External differences included an anti-submarine net cutter on the bow, as well as an O-ring for towing purposes.

Sulzer was retained as the manufacturer for the diesel engines, which had a slightly improved performance over the engines in I-52. For surface running, the submarines were powered by two 3,400-brake-horsepower (2,535 kW) diesel engines, each driving one propeller shaft. When the submarine was submerged, each propeller was driven by a 900-horsepower (671 kW) electric motor. The submarines could reach 20 knots (37 km/h; 23 mph) on the surface and 8 knots (15 km/h; 9.2 mph) submerged. On the surface, the KD3As had a range of 10,000 nautical miles (19,000 km; 12,000 mi) at 10 knots (19 km/h; 12 mph); submerged, they had a range of 90 nmi (170 km; 100 mi) at 3 knots (5.6 km/h; 3.5 mph).

The submarines had eight internal 53.3 cm (21.0 in) torpedo tubes, six in the bow and two in the stern. They carried one reload for each tube for a total of 16 torpedoes. They were also had one 120 mm (4.7 in) deck gun.

== Construction and commissioning ==
Built by the Kure Naval Arsenal in Kure, Japan, I-53 was laid down on 1 April 1924 as Submarine No. 64 (第六十四号潜水艦, Dai-rokujūyon-gō sensuikan) and renamed I-53 (伊号第五三号潜水艦, I-gō Dai-gojūsan-gō sensuikan) on 1 November 1924. She was launched on 5 August 1925 and completed and commissioned on 30 March 1927.

== Service history ==
=== Pre-World War II ===
On the day of her commissioning, I-53 was attached to the Kure Naval District. On 5 May 1927, she was assigned to Submarine Division 17 in Submarine Squadron 2 in the 2nd Fleet, a component of the Combined Fleet. On 5 September 1927, Submarine Division 18 was established as a new component of Submarine Squadron 2, and she was assigned to the new division. On 1 December 1930, the division was reassigned to the Kure Defense Squadron in the Kure Naval District, but on 1 December 1931 it began a new tour of duty in Submarine Squadron 2 in the 2nd Fleet.

I-53 got underway from Sasebo, Japan, on 29 June 1933 with the other submarines of her squadron — I-54 and I-55 of Submarine Division 18 and Submarine Division 19′s I-56, I-57 and I-58 — for a training cruise off China and Mako in the Pescadores Islands, which the submarines concluded with their arrival at Takao, Formosa, on 5 July 1933. They departed Takao on 13 July 1933 and again trained in Chinese waters before arriving in Tokyo Bay on 21 August 1933. On 25 August 1933, all six submarines took part in a fleet review at Yokohama, Japan. Submarine Division 18 was reassigned to the Kure Defense Division in the Kure Naval District on 15 November 1933 and to the Kure Guard Squadron in the Kure Naval District on 11 December 1933.

On 1 February 1934, Submarine Division 18 returned to duty with Submarine Squadron 2 in the 2nd Fleet, and on 7 February 1935 I-53 got underway from Sasebo along with the other eight submarines of Submarine Squadron 2 — I-54, I-55, I-59, I-60, I-61, I-62, I-63, and I-64 — for a training cruise in the Kuril Islands. The cruise concluded with their arrival at Sukumo Bay on 25 February 1935. The nine submarines departed Sasebo on 29 March 1935 to train in Chinese waters, returning to Sasebo on 4 April 1935. On 15 November 1935, Submarine Division 18 was reassigned to Submarine Squadron 1 in the 1st Fleet, a component of the Combined Fleet.

I-53 got underway for fleet exercises off Honshu on 1 February 1936. She was operating on the surface in limited visibility in the Pacific Ocean off Honshu and proceeding toward Sukumo Bay on 27 February 1936 when she suffered an engine failure and I-56 accidentally rammed her 32 nautical miles (59 km; 37 mi) southeast of Daiosaki lighthouse. Both submarines suffered minor damage. Again at sea for fleet exercises off Kyushu in May 1936, she again suffered damage in a collision, this time with I-55 on 10 May 1936.

On 15 November 1939, Submarine Division 18 was reassigned to Submarine Squadron 4 in the 1st Fleet. On 11 October 1940, I-53 was one of 98 Imperial Japanese Navy ships that gathered along with more than 500 aircraft on the Japanese coast at Yokohama Bay for an Imperial fleet review — the largest fleet review in Japanese history — in honor of the 2,600th anniversary of the enthronement of the Emperor Jimmu, Japan's legendary first emperor. Submarine Squadron 4 was assigned directly to the Combined Fleet on 15 November 1940.

As the Japanese armed forces mobilized for an offensive against Allied forces that would begin the Pacific campaign of World War II, I-53, I-54, and I-55 departed Kure, Japan, on 20 November 1941 bound for Samah on China′s Hainan Island, which they reached on 26 November 1941. All three submarines departed Samah on 1 December 1941 to take up positions to support the offensive. Tasked with supporting Operation E, the Japanese invasion of British Malaya, I-53 arrived in her patrol area in the South China Sea north of the Anambas Islands on 7 December 1941.

=== World War II ===
==== First war patrol ====
Hostilities began in East Asia on 8 December 1941 (7 December across the International Date Line in Hawaii, where Japan began the war with its attack on Pearl Harbor). The Japanese invasion of British Malaya began that day. After an uneventful patrol, I-53 arrived at Cam Ranh Bay in Japanese-occupied French Indochina on 20 December 1941.

==== Second war patrol ====
On 29 December 1941, I-53 departed Cam Ranh Bay in company with I-54, both submarines beginning their second war patrols. They both suffered damage in a heavy gale and had to return to Cam Ranh Bay Bay for repairs. With them complete, I-53 got underway from Cam Ranh Bay again on 6 January 1942 to begin the patrol, and operated northwest of Java in the Netherlands East Indies. After another quiet patrol, she returned to Cam Ranh Bay on 24 January 1942.

==== Third war patrol ====
I-53 departed Cam Ranh Bay on 7 February 1942 in company with I-54 to begin her third war patrol. She transited the Lombok Strait on 20 February and entered the Indian Ocean, where she torpedoed and sank the Dutch 917-gross register ton auxiliary tanker Ben 2 – which was on a voyage from Surabaya, Java, to Australia with a cargo of 150-millimeter (5.9 in) artillery shells – 25 nautical miles (46 km; 29 mi) southwest of Banyuwangi, Java, on 27 February. On 28 February, she torpedoed the British 8,917-gross-register-ton armed cargo ship City of Manchester in the Indian Ocean south of Tjilatjap, Java, at 08°16′S 108°52′E, inflicting further damage on the ship with gunfire. The burning City of Manchester soon sank. Of the 157 people aboard City of Manchester, three lost their lives and six went missing, possibly taken by the Japanese as prisoners of war. I-53 completed her patrol on 8 March 1942, arriving at Staring Bay on the coast of the Celebes.

==== Training duties ====
Submarine Squadron 4 was disbanded on 10 March 1942, and Submarine Division 18 was assigned to the Kure Guard Unit in the Kure Naval District in Japanese home waters. I-53, I-54, and I-55 departed Staring Bay on 16 March 1942 and arrived at Kure, Japan, on 25 March, where they assumed duties as training ships. I-53 suffered minor damage when the submarine tender Chōgei grazed her in the Iyo Nada in the Seto Inland Sea on either 6 or 8 May 1942 (sources disagree on the date), and on 20 May 1942 she was renumbered I-153.

On 5 January 1943, I-153 took part in a Naval Submarine School submarine camouflage experiment in the Seto Inland Sea in which she and the submarine I-156 had a black camouflage scheme applied to their upper hulls and conning tower sides. From 26 March to 1 December 1943, she served as flagship of Submarine Division 18. She exchanged commanding officers with the submarine I-32 while moored at the submarine school at Kure on 10 January 1944.

Submarine Division 18 was deactivated on 31 January 1944, and I-153 was placed in fourth reserve and transferred to the Hirao Branch of the Ōtake Submarine School to serve as a training hulk. She was laid up at Hirao on 15 August 1945, the day hostilities between Japan and the Allies ceased.

== Disposal ==
I-153 surrendered to the Allies after the war and was stricken from the Navy list on 30 November 1945. Apparently, she was among several captured Japanese submarines sunk as gunnery targets by the Royal Australian Navy destroyer HMAS Quiberon and the Royal Indian Navy sloop HMIS Sutlej in the Inland Sea on 8 May 1946, although some sources say she was scrapped in 1948 rather than sunk.

== Bibliography ==
- Bagnasco, Erminio (1977). Submarines of World War Two. Annapolis, Maryland: Naval Institute Press. ISBN 0-87021-962-6.
- Boyd, Carl (2002). The Japanese Submarine Force in World War II. Annapolis, Maryland: Naval Institute Press. ISBN 1-55750-015-0.
- Carpenter, Dorr B. & Polmar, Norman (1986). Submarines of the Imperial Japanese Navy 1904–1945. London: Conway Maritime Press. ISBN 0-85177-396-6.
- Chesneau, Roger, ed. (1980). Conway's All the World's Fighting Ships 1922–1946. Greenwich, UK: Conway Maritime Press. ISBN 0-85177-146-7.
- Hackett, Bob; Kingsepp, Sander (2013). "IJN Submarine I-153: Tabular Record of Movement". combinedfleet.com.
- Evans, David C. (1997). Kaigun: Strategy, Tactics, and Technology in the Imperial Japanese Navy, 1887-1941. Annapolis, Maryland: Naval Institute Press. ISBN 0-87021-192-7.
- Jentschura, Hansgeorg; Jung, Dieter & Mickel, Peter (1977). Warships of the Imperial Japanese Navy, 1869–1945. Annapolis, Maryland: United States Naval Institute. ISBN 0-87021-893-X.
- Stille, Mark (2007). Imperial Japanese Navy Submarines 1941-45. Osprey. ISBN 978-1846030901.
