= Japanese submarine I-54 (1926) =

Japanese Navy Cruiser

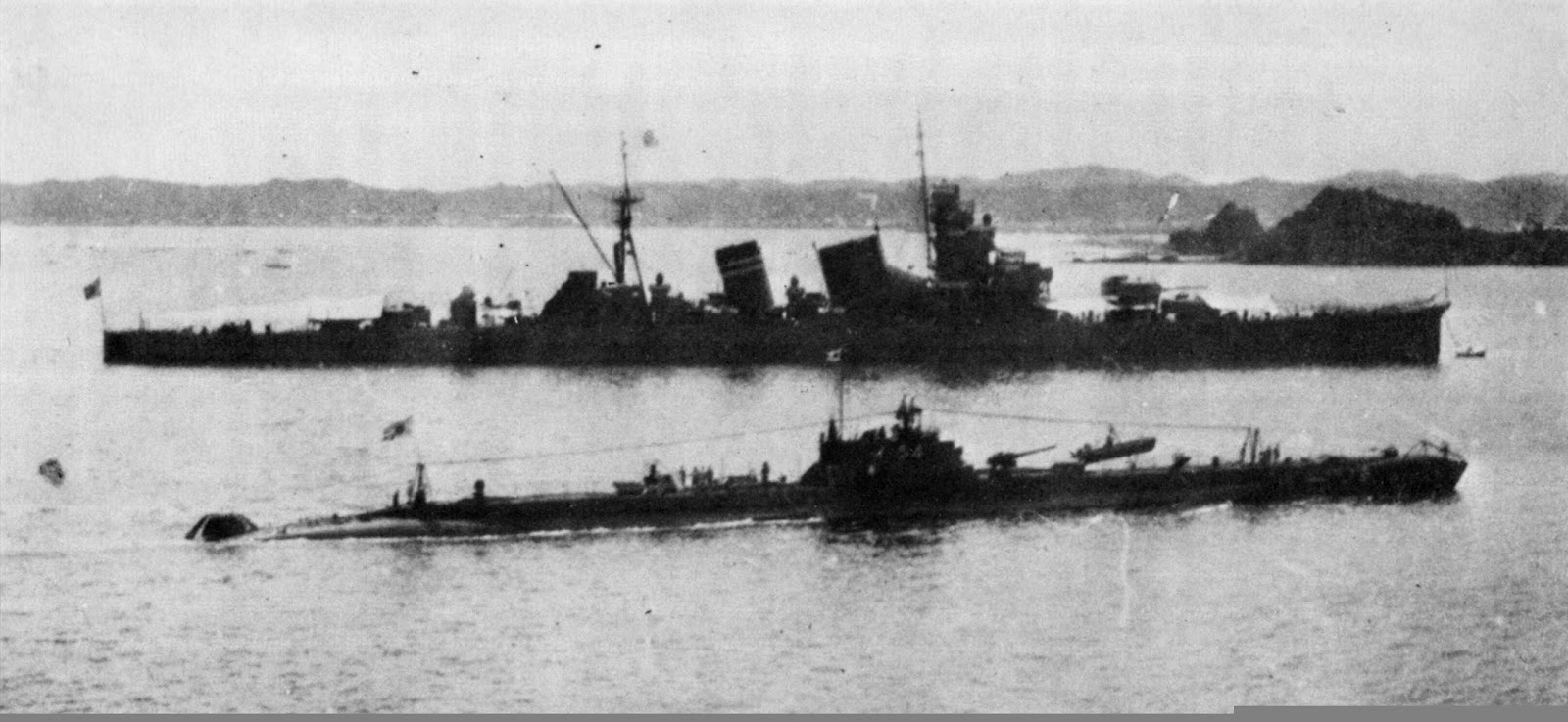
- I-54 and the heavy cruiser Kinugasa anchored together in 1930

History

Imperial Japanese Navy
- Name: Submarine No. 77
- Renamed: I-54 on 1 November 1924
- Builder: Sasebo Naval Arsenal, Sasebo, Japan
- Laid down: 15 November 1924
- Launched: 15 March 1926
- Completed: 15 December 1927
- Commissioned: 15 December 1927
- Decommissioned: February 1932
- Recommissioned: by June 1933 or mid-November 1934 (see text)
- Decommissioned: 1 November 1937
- Recommissioned: late March 1938
- Decommissioned: 19 June 1941
- Recommissioned: 15 August 1941
- Decommissioned: 31 January 1944
- Stricken: 20 November 1945
- Fate: Scuttled 8 May 1946

General characteristics
- Class & type: Kaidai-class submarine (KD3A Type)
- Displacement: 1,829 t (1,800 long tons) surfaced; 2,337 t (2,300 long tons) submerged
- Length: 100 m (328 ft 1 in)
- Beam: 8 m (26 ft 3 in)
- Draft: 4.82 m (15 ft 10 in)
- Installed power: 6,800 bhp (5,071 kW) (diesels); 1,800 hp (1,342 kW) (electric motors)
- Propulsion: Diesel-electric; 2 × diesel engines; 2 × electric motors
- Speed: 20 knots (37 km/h; 23 mph) surfaced; 8 knots (15 km/h; 9.2 mph) submerged
- Range: 10,000 nmi (19,000 km; 12,000 mi) at 10 knots (19 km/h; 12 mph) surfaced; 90 nmi (170 km; 100 mi) at 3 knots (5.6 km/h; 3.5 mph) submerged
- Test depth: 60 m (197 ft)
- Complement: 60
- Armament: 8 × 533 mm (21 in) torpedo tubes (6 bow, 2 stern), 16 torpedoes; 1 × 120 mm (4.7 in) deck gun

I-54 (伊号第五四潜水艦, I-gō Dai-gojūyonsensuikan), later I-154 (伊号第五四潜水艦, I-gō Dai-Hyaku-gojūyon sensuikan), was an Imperial Japanese Navy Kaidai-class cruiser submarine of the KD3A sub-class commissioned in 1927. During World War II, she conducted three war patrols, supporting Japanese forces during the invasion of Malaya in December 1941 and the Dutch East Indies campaign in early 1942, then was assigned to training duties until she was decommissioned in 1944. She was scuttled in 1946.

== Background ==
Following World War I, the Imperial Japanese Navy re-evaluated the use of submarine warfare as an element of fleet strategy due to the successful deployment of long-range cruiser submarines for commerce raiding by the Imperial German Navy. Japanese strategists came to realize possibilities for using submarines for long-range reconnaissance and in a war of attrition against an enemy fleet approaching Japan. The Japanese already had built two large, long-range submarines — (I-51 and I-52) — under the Eight-six fleet program as prototypes, but the arrival on 20 June 1919 of seven German U-boats Japan receivedas war reparations after the end of World War I led to a complete re-design. The Japanese quickly hired hundreds of German submarine engineers, technicians, and former U-boat officers unemployed after the defeat of the German Empire in World War I and brought them to Japan under five-year contracts. The United States Navy′s Office of Naval Intelligence estimated that some 800 German advisors had gone to Japan by the end of 1920. The Japanese also sent delegations to Germany and were active in purchasing many patents.

== Design ==
The four Kaidai Type IIIa submarines were the first mass-produced Japanese fleet submarines. Based largely on the Japanese Kaidai Type II submarine I-52, their design was also influenced by the largest of the German submarines in Japanese hands, SM U-125. Compared to I-52, they had a strengthened double hull. The hull had almost the same outer dimensions as in I-52, but the increased thickness of the inner hull permitted a diving depth of 60 meters (197 ft). The internal volume was slightly increased over that of I-52 by making the hull slightly trapezoidal in cross-section at the expense of 300 tons of additional displacement. External differences included an anti-submarine net cutter on the bow, as well as an O-ring for towing purposes.

The Kaidai Type IIIa submarines displaced 1,829 metric tons (1,800 long tons) surfaced and 2,337 metric tons (2,300 long tons) submerged. They were 100 meters (328 ft 1 in) long and had a beam of 8 meters (26 ft 3 in) and a draft of 4.82 meters (15 ft 10 in). They had a complement of 60 officers and crewmen.

The Japanese retained Sulzer as the manufacturer for the diesel engines, which had a slightly improved performance over the engines in I-52. For surface running, the submarines were powered by two 3,400-brake-horsepower (2,535 kW) diesel engines, each driving one propeller shaft. When submerged each propeller was driven by a 900-horsepower (671 kW) electric motor. The submarines could reach 20 knots (37 km/h; 23 mph) on the surface and 8 knots (15 km/h; 9.2 mph) submerged. On the surface, the KD3As had a range of 10,000 nautical miles (19,000 km; 12,000 mi) at 10 knots (19 km/h; 12 mph); submerged, they had a range of 90 nmi (170 km; 100 mi) at 3 knots (5.6 km/h; 3.5 mph).

The submarines had eight internal 53.3 cm (21.0 in) torpedo tubes, six in the bow and two in the stern. They carried one reload for each tube for a total of 16 torpedoes. They also had one 120 mm (4.7 in) deck gun.

== Construction and commissioning ==
Originally named Submarine No.77 (第七十七号潜水艦, Dai-nanajunana-gō sensuikan), the submarine was renamed I-54 on 1 November 1924 before her construction began. She was laid down on 15 November 1924 at the Sasebo Naval Arsenal in Sasebo, Japan. Launched on 15 March 1926, she was completed and commissioned on 15 December 1927.

== Service history ==
=== Pre-World War II ===
On the day of her commissioning, I-54 was attached to the Kure Naval District and assigned to Submarine Division 18, initially as a reserve unit. Her division was assigned to Submarine Squadron 2 in the 2nd Fleet, a component of the Combined Fleet, on 1 February 1928. The division was reassigned to the Kure Defense Division in the Kure Naval District on 1 December 1930, then began a second tour as a component of Submarine Squadron 2 in the 2nd Fleet on 1 December 1931.

At 13:48 on 10 February 1932 I-54 suffered a steering failure off Kyushu 20 nautical miles (37 km; 23 mi) south of Odate Shima lighthouse while Submarine Division 18 was on maneuvers during fleet exercises. She reduced speed to 3 knots (5.6 km/h; 3.5 mph), but nonetheless accidentally rammed her sister ship I-55, suffering damage to her bow and flooding a compartment. She proceeded to Sasebo for repairs, which took one week. After their completion, she was placed in reserve at Kure, Japan.

Between February 1932 and mid-November 1934, Submarine Division 18 was reassigned to the Kure Defense Division in the Kure Naval District on 15 November 1933 and then to the Kure Defense Squadron in the Kure Naval District on 11 December 1933 before it began a third tour of duty in Submarine Squadron 2 in the 2nd Fleet on 1 February 1934. Sources disagree on I-54′s activities during this period. According to one source, she remained in reserve at Kure throughout the period. Another source credits her with taking part in Submarine Division 18's activities, including getting underway from Sasebo on 29 June 1933 with the other submarines of her squadron (I-53 and I-55 of her division and Submarine Division 19's I-56, I-57 and I-58) for a training cruise off China and Mako in the Pescadores Islands which the submarines concluded with their arrival at Takao, Formosa, on 5 July 1933; departing Takao on 13 July 1933 with the other five submarines and again training in Chinese waters before arriving in Tokyo Bay on 21 August 1933; and taking part with the other five submarines in a fleet review at Yokohama, Japan, on 25 August 1933.

Sources agree that I-54 was back in active service by mid-November 1934. On 7 February 1935 I-54 got underway from Sasebo along with the other eight submarines of Submarine Squadron 2 — I-53, I-55, I-59, I-60, I-61, I-62, I-63, and I-64 — for a training cruise in the Kuril Islands. The cruise concluded with their arrival at Sukumo Bay on 25 February 1935. The nine submarines departed Sasebo on 29 March 1935 to train in Chinese waters, returning to Sasebo on 4 April 1935. On 15 November 1935, Submarine Division 18 transferred from Submarine Squadron 2 in the 2nd Fleet to Submarine Squadron 1 in the 1st Fleet, also a component of the Combined Fleet.

I-54 again was in reserve at Kure from 1 November 1937 to late March 1938. On 15 November 1939, Submarine Division 18 was reassigned to Submarine Squadron 4 in the 1st Fleet, and on 15 November 1940 Submarine Squadron 4 was reassigned directly to the Combined Fleet. Placed in reserve at Kure again on 19 June 1941, I-54 returned to active service on 15 August 1941.

As the Japanese armed forces mobilized for an offensive against Allied forces that would begin the Pacific campaign of World War II, I-53, I-54, and I-55 departed Kure, Japan, on 20 November 1941 bound for Samah on China's Hainan Island, which they reached on 26 November 1941. All three submarines departed Samah on 1 December 1941 to take up positions to support the offensive. Tasked with supporting Operation E, the Japanese invasion of British Malaya, I-54 arrived in her patrol area in the South China Sea north of the Anambas Islands on 7 December 1941.

=== World War II ===
==== First war patrol ====
Hostilities began in East Asia on 8 December 1941 (which was 7 December on the other side of the International Date Line in Hawaii, where the war began with the Japanese attack on Pearl Harbor). That day, I-54 and I-55 formed a patrol line in the South China Sea northeast of Kuantan, British Malaya. Early on the morning of 14 December 1941, the Dutch submarine HNLMS K XII detected faint propeller noises, apparently those of a Japanese submarine, and at 11:00 sighted a periscope to starboard. K XII steered to ram the Japanese submarine and had closed to 100 meters (109 yd) of where lookouts had last seen the periscope when the periscope reappeared to port. K XII abandoned the ramming attempt and broke contact by zigzagging away. The submarine she attempted to ram probably was I-54, I-55, or I-56. I-54 concluded her patrol with her arrival at Cam Ranh Bay in Japanese-occupied French Indochina on 20 December 1941.

==== Second war patrol ====
On 29 December 1941, I-54 departed Cam Ranh Bay in company with I-53, both submarines beginning their second war patrols. They both suffered damage in a heavy gale and had to return to Cam Ranh Bay Bay for repairs. With them complete, I-54 got underway from Cam Ranh Bay again on 12 January 1942 to begin her second patrol, assigned a patrol area off Singapore. The patrol was uneventful, and she returned to Cam Ranh Bay on 21 January 1942.

==== Third war patrol ====
I-54 departed Cam Ranh Bay in company with I-53 on 7 February 1942 to begin her third war patrol, tasked to provide distant support during the Japanese invasion of Java in the Netherlands East Indies. After Japanese forces successfully landed on Java and Sumatra on 8 February 1942, I-54 received orders on 9 February to move to the Anambas Islands area. On 13 February, she transited the Lombok Strait between Bali and Lombok and entered the Indian Ocean to occupy a new patrol area at the southern entrance to the Sunda Strait between Java and Sumatra, and she also reportedly transited the Lombok Strait into the Indian Ocean on 20 February 1942. While south of the Sunda Strait on 24 February, she conducted an unsuccessful torpedo attack against an unidentified Allied tanker, failing to score any hits. On 1 March 1942, she fired torpedoes at a large, unidentified Allied cargo ship off Tjilatjap, Java, but they all missed astern. I-54 claimed two Allied merchant ships sunk during her patrol, and some sources assert that she sank the Dutch 8,806-gross register ton motor cargo ship Modjokerto in the 1 March 1942 attack, while others credit the submarine I-58 with sinking Modjokerto, and still others assert that the log of the Japanese heavy cruiser Chikuma and distress signals transmitted by Modjokerto indicate that Chikuma sank her. I-54′s patrol ended with her arrival at Staring Bay on the coast of the Celebes on 7 March 1942.

==== March 1942–November 1945 ====
On 10 March 1942, Submarine Squadron 4 was disbanded, and I-53, I-54, and I-55 were reassigned to the Kure Guard Unit in the Kure Naval District in Japan. They departed Staring Bay on 16 March 1942 and I-54 arrived at Kure, Japan, on 25 March 1942. They thereafter served as a training ships. On 20 May 1942, I-54 was renumbered I-154. On 1 December 1943, she became the flagship of Submarine Division 18.

In December 1943, I-154 was repainted in a new experimental camouflage paint scheme — dark grey with a bluish hue, applied to her hull and the sides of her conning tower — inspired by that of the German submarine U-511, which Japan had purchased in 1943 and redesignated Ro-500. I-154 participated in the first stage of Submarine School tests of the paint scheme in the Iyo Nada in the Seto Inland Sea on 5 January 1944 to determine the effectiveness of the paint against detection by surface warships and aircraft. The experiment was a failure.

On 31 January 1944, Submarine Division 18 was disbanded and I-154 was decommissioned and placed in reserve. She remained docked without a crew at Kure for the remainder of World War II, which ended with the cessation of hostilities on 15 August 1945. The Japanese removed her from the navy list on 20 November 1945.

== Disposal ==
I-154 was seized by the Allies after the end of World War II. In Operation Bottom, she was scuttled by gunfire along with the submarines Ha-205, I-153, I-155, Ro-59, Ro-62, and Ro-63 in the Iyo Nada in the Seto Inland Sea on 8 May 1946 by the Royal Australian Navy destroyer HMAS Quiberon and the Royal Indian Navy sloop-of-war HMIS Sutlej.
