= Japanese submarine I-58 =

Japanese submarine I-58 may refer to one of the following submarines of the Imperial Japanese Navy:

- Japanese submarine I-58 (1925), a Kaidai-type submarine; renamed I-158 in 1942; scuttled in 1946
- Japanese submarine I-58 (1943), a Type B submarine; sunk as a target in 1946
