= Japanese submarine I-165 =

1931 Type KD5 submarine

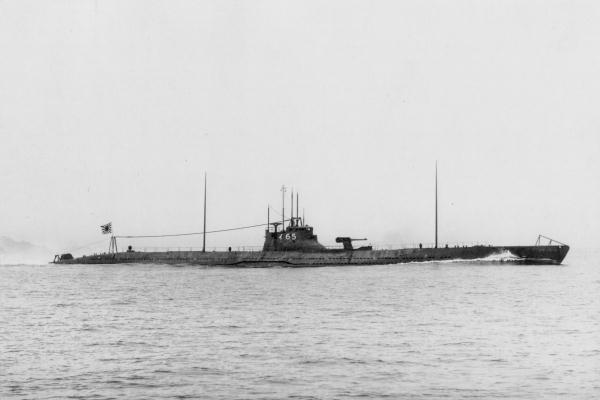
- I-65 leaving Kure for trials on 30 August 1932.

History

Empire of Japan
- Name: I-65
- Builder: Kure Naval Arsenal
- Laid down: 19 December 1929
- Launched: 2 June 1931
- Completed: 1 December 1932
- Renamed: I-165, 20 May 1942
- Reclassified: Training ship, December 1944
- Fate: Sunk by US aircraft, 27 June 1945

General characteristics
- Class & type: Kaidai-class submarine (KD5 Type)
- Displacement: 1,732 tonnes (1,705 long tons) surfaced; 2,367 tonnes (2,330 long tons) submerged
- Length: 97.7 m (320 ft 6 in)
- Beam: 8.2 m (26 ft 11 in)
- Draft: 4.7 m (15 ft 5 in)
- Installed power: 6,000 bhp (4,500 kW) (diesels); 1,800 hp (1,300 kW) (electric motors)
- Propulsion: Diesel-electric; 2 × diesel engines; 2 × electric motors
- Speed: 20 knots (37 km/h; 23 mph) surfaced; 8.25 knots (15.28 km/h; 9.49 mph) submerged
- Range: 10,800 nmi (20,000 km; 12,400 mi) at 10 knots (19 km/h; 12 mph) surfaced; 60 nmi (110 km; 69 mi) at 3 knots (5.6 km/h; 3.5 mph) submerged
- Test depth: 70 m (230 ft)
- Complement: 75
- Armament: 6 × 533 mm (21 in) torpedo tubes (4 bow, 2 stern); 1 × 120 mm (4.7 in) deck gun; 1 × 13.2 mm (0.52 in) anti-aircraft machinegun

I-65, later renumbered I-165, was an Imperial Japanese Navy Kaidai type cruiser submarine commissioned in 1932. A KD5 sub-class submarine, she served during World War II, supporting Japanese forces in the invasion of Malaya and the Dutch East Indies campaign, participating in the Battle of Midway, and patrolling in the Indian Ocean and Pacific Ocean before she was sunk in 1945. In 1944, her crew committed a war crime, massacring the survivors of the merchant ship Nancy Moller.

== Design and description ==
The submarines of the KD5 sub-class were improved versions of the preceding KD4 sub-class. They displaced 1,732 tonnes (1,705 long tons) surfaced and 2,367 tonnes (2,330 long tons) submerged. The submarines were 97.7 meters (320 ft 6 in) long and had a beam of 8.2 meters (26 ft 11 in) and a draft of 4.7 meters (15 ft 5 in). The submarines had a diving depth of 75 m (246 ft)

For surface running, the submarines were powered by two 3,400-brake-horsepower (2,535 kW) diesel engines, each driving one propeller shaft. When submerged, each propeller was driven by a 900-horsepower (671 kW) electric motor. They could reach 20 knots (37 km/h; 23 mph) on the surface and 8 knots (15 km/h; 9.2 mph) underwater. On the surface, the KD5s had a range of 10,800 nautical miles (20,000 km; 12,400 mi) at 10 knots (19 km/h; 12 mph); submerged, they had a range of 60 nmi (110 km; 69 mi) at 3 knots (5.6 km/h; 3.5 mph).

The submarines were armed with six internal 53.3 cm (21.0 in) torpedo tubes, four in the bow and two in the stern. They carried a total of 14 torpedoes. They were also armed with one 100 mm (3.9 in) deck gun and a 13.2 mm (0.52 in) machine gun.

== Construction and career ==
Built at the Kure Naval Arsenal, laid down as I-65 on 19 December 1929, launched on 2 June 1931 and completed on 1 December 1932. Lt Cdr Hankyu Sasaki was her first commanding officer and she was assigned to Submarine Division 30. On 20 August 1941, just prior to the outbreak of the war in the Pacific, Lt Cdr Harada Hakue is appointed commanding officer. She was part of the 5th Submarine Squadron.

=== 1941 ===
Her first mission was on 8 December 1941 as part of Operation "E" – the Japanese invasion of Malaya. Together with I-166 in SubDiv 30 (and I-162, I-164 in SubDiv 29), all four submarines were assigned to patrol the South China Sea about 50 miles (80 km) east of Trengganu, Malaya. The following day at 14:15 hours (local) near Poulo Condore Island (05-00N, 105-30E) I-65 reported sighting Force Zs battleships HMS Prince of Wales and HMS Repulse.

On 13 December 1941 she provided cover for Japanese landings on North Borneo.

=== 1942 ===
On 9 January 1942 while on patrol in the Java Sea she torpedoed, shelled and sank the 1,003-ton Dutch steamship Benkoelen that was en route from Soemenep to Cheribon at 04-50S, 112-50E. On 14 January 1942 at 0217 (JST) in the Indian Ocean west of the Mentawai Islands at 00-12S, 97-00E she torpedoed and sank the 5,102-ton British-Indian armed merchant Jalarahan which was en route from Singapore to Calcutta. She then returned to Penang on 20 January 1942 becoming the first Japanese submarine to arrive there.

On her third patrol between 5 February and 28 February she torpedoed and damaged the British converted boom carrier Laomedon 45 miles SE of Ceylon. In the Arabian Sea on 15 February she torpedoed and sank the 4,681-ton Johanne Justesen and on 20 February in the Indian Ocean, torpedoed and sank the 5,280-ton British merchant Bhima. She attacked another merchant ship on 21 February, but missed with her torpedoes.

Redesignated I-165 on 20 May, she was moved to Kwajalein on 24 May and was put on patrol during the Battle of Midway north of Kure Island. On 30 June Commander Torisu Kennosuke (鳥巣 建之助) (may also be known as Tatenosuke Tosu) became the commanding officer and on 10 July she was reassigned to the Southwest Area Fleet.

Returning to Penang on 6 August she began a new patrol of the Indian Ocean on 11 August. On 25 August torpedoed and sank the 5,237-ton British armed merchant Harmonides. A short time later she suffered storm damage and was forced to return to Penang having avoided a searching flying boat and British destroyer. She arrived at Penang on 31 August.

With the damage repaired she left Penang on 16 September with five Indian National Army insurgents on board. They were to be landed on the north-west coast of India. On the way torpedoed and sank the American armed freighter Losmar and claimed to have sunk another merchant ship the following day. She reached her destination 5 miles (8.0 km) off the coast of Gujarat and west of Junagadh after sunset on 28 September. The insurgents were landed in an inflatable without being observed. She then returned to Penang.

In November and December she was based in Surabaya to counter a rumored American landing on Timor. The landing did not eventuate and she returned to Penang.

=== 1943 ===
In January she was sent to bombard Geraldton, Western Australia, as a diversionary raid to assist with the evacuation of Japanese troops through the Sunda Strait. After narrowly avoiding patrolling destroyers and aircraft Kennosuke decided to attack nearby Port Gregory instead. He mistook the local fish cannery for an ammunition plant and bombarded it with 10 shells from the submarines Type 88 4.7-inch (119 mm) deck gun. The gun had a 16 km (9.9 mi) range. She returned to Surabaya on 16 February.

On 25 May Lieutenant Commander Shimizu Tsuruzo became her commanding officer and on 9 October she was reassigned to 8th Submarine Squadron. On 16 December, while sailing from Singapore to Penang she was attacked by an Allied submarine. The submarine's torpedoes missed and she arrived safely on 18 December.

=== 1944 ===
At 08:00 on 18 March I-165 fired two torpedoes at the British 3,916-gross register ton armed merchant ship Nancy Moller, which had left Durban, South Africa, on 28 February bound for Colombo, Ceylon, with a full cargo of coal and had received directions from the British Admiralty the previous day to alter course to the east to avoid an area 300 to 350 nautical miles (560 to 650 km; 350 to 400 mi) south-southwest of Ceylon in which the Japanese submarine I-162 had sunk the British steamer SS Fort MacLeod on 3 March, a diversion which inadvertently took her into I-165′s patrol area. Both torpedoes hit Nancy Moller in her port side in quick succession, and she sank in less than a minute at 02°14′N 078°25′E. Some of Nancy Moller′s survivors managed to board four life rafts before I-165 surfaced less than 50 yards (46 m) from an overturned lifeboat. A member of I-165′s crew called out from her conning tower for Nancy Moller′s captain and chief engineer to identify themselves, but received no response. I-165 came alongside a raft and interrogated its occupants about the whereabouts of the captain and chief engineer, receiving the standard response that both had died in the sinking, as Allied merchant ship crews were trained to do. I-165′s crew then brought the raft's six occupants aboard, took gunlayer Dennis Fryer below as a prisoner-of-war, forced the other five men from the raft — two Chinese and three Indian sailors — to kneel on deck, shot the two Chinese in the back and kicked them overboard, and pushed the three Indians overboard without shooting them. I-165 then spent ten minutes moving slowly through debris and the life rafts, nudging wreckage aside and machine-gunning every Nancy Moller survivor she could find in the water before departing the area, disappearing over the horizon two hours after she ended her attack on the survivors. For the remainder of I-165′s patrol, the Japanese subjected Fryer to harsh, continuous questioning, and after I-165 returned to Penang, he was imprisoned there and placed on a starvation diet for three months, then transferred to a jail in Singapore, from which he was freed at the end of the war. Of the crew of 55 and seven gunners aboard Nancy Moller, only 32 men other than Fryer survived her sinking and the subsequent massacre. The Royal Navy light cruiser HMS Emerald rescued them from four life rafts on 22 March and put them ashore at Port Louis, Mauritius, on 26 March 1944.

On 12 August I-165 was sent from Surabaya on a rescue and resupply mission to Korim Bay. She arrived on 18 August and after unsuccessfully attempting to contact the troops at Korim Point came under attack by three subchasers. She was heavily depth-charged and developed a major leak to her engine room. Ten hours after the attack began she surfaced and headed to Ambon for temporary repairs arriving there on 23 August. She then returned to the Sasebo Naval Arsenal for repair and an overhaul. Lieutenant Commander Ono Yasushi took over command and she was reassigned to Submarine Division 19 as training ship.

=== 1945 ===
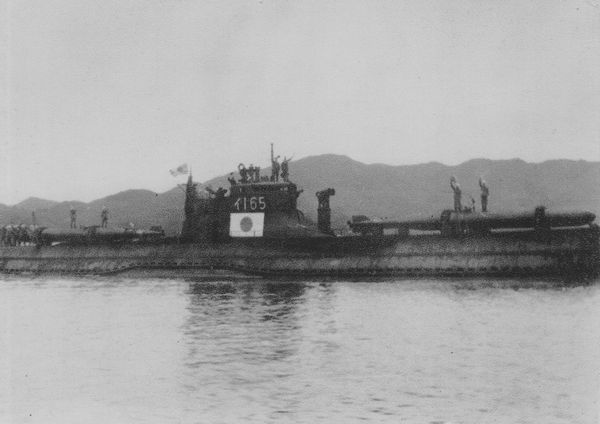
I-165 as a Kaiten carrier

Converted to a Kaiten mother ship and fitted with Type 3 Mark 1 Model 3 "13-Go" air-search radar, she was returned to active service with the 6th Fleet's Submarine Division 34. She was sunk by a United States Navy patrol bomber of Patrol Bomber Squadron 142 (VPB-142) on 27 June 1945 in the Mariana Islands at 15°28′N 153°39′E.

== Sinkings ==
- Sank Dutch merchant ship Benkoelen on 9 January 1942
- Sank Indian merchant ship Jalarajan on 15 January 1942
- Sank Netherlands merchant Johanne Justesen on 15 February 1942
- Sank RMS Bhima on 20 February 1942
- Sank SS Harmonides on 25 August 1942
- Sank SS Losmar on 24 September 1942
- Shelled Port Gregory on 28 January 1943
- Sank RMS Perseus on 16 January 1944
- Sank SS Nancy Moller on 18 March 1944
