= Cruiser submarine =

Type of large war submarine

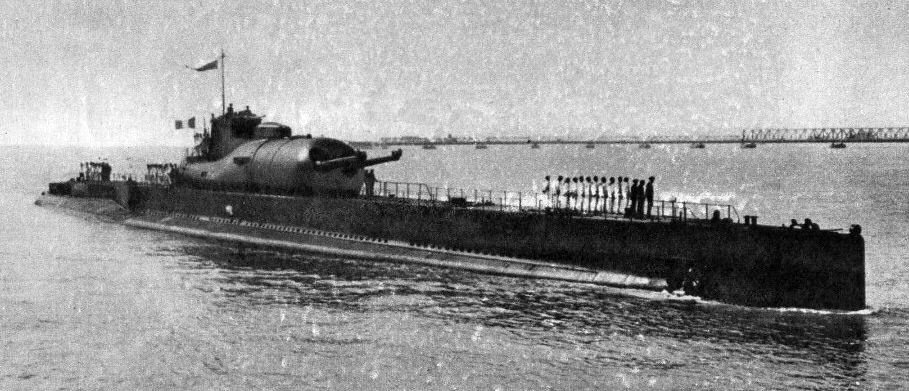
Surcouf had the largest guns of any cruiser submarine.

A cruiser submarine was a very large submarine designed to remain at sea for extended periods in areas distant from base facilities. Their role was analogous to surface cruisers; cruising distant waters, commerce raiding, and otherwise operating independently. When operating in a fleet, cruisers and cruiser submarines were expected to scout for and screen the battle fleet. Cruiser submarines were successful for a brief period of World War I, but were less successful than smaller submarines during World War II. Large submarines remained vulnerable to damage from defensively equipped merchant ships (DEMS), were slow to dive if found by aircraft, offered a large sonar echo surface, and were less able to defensively maneuver during depth charge attacks.

== History ==
The cruiser submarine concept originated during the unrestricted submarine warfare campaign of 1917. Three German Type U 139 submarines and seven former merchant submarines, each armed with two 15-centimetre (5.9 in) guns, patrolled areas distant from their North Sea bases to sink Allied merchant shipping as part of an effort to starve the UK into submission. These distant patrols avoided the defensive convoy measures which limited successful submarine attacks in the vicinity of the British Isles.

The First World War combat experience of these submarines encouraged all major navies to build submarine cruiser prototypes between the world wars. Nevertheless, their cost discouraged most from proceeding with further production. Developments were further limited by the London Naval Treaty of 1930, under which each signatory was permitted to possess no more than three large submarines, each above 2,000 tons (2,032 metric tons) but not exceeding 2,800 tons (2,845 metric tons) standard displacement, with guns not exceeding 6.1 in (150 mm) in caliber.

The Imperial Japanese Navy’s focus on forcing a decisive fleet action encouraged development of a wide variety of submarine cruisers, (known as Junsen (巡潜, "Cruiser Submarines")) including the J Type of the 1920s, and the A, B, and C types in the 1940s. Germany decided against building projected 3,140-ton type XI U-boats with an aircraft hangar and four 5-inch (13 cm) guns. Long-range submarines with less impressive deck guns, including Type IXD2 U-boats and United States Navy fleet submarines, evolved through the Second World War; and may be identified as cruiser submarines in comparison to submarines designed for shorter patrols over lesser distances.

== Examples ==
Name	Nation	Surface displacement	Submerged displacement	Speed (Surfaced)	Guns	Torpedo tubes	Crew	Year	Reference
Type U-139	Germany	1,930 tons	2,483 tons	15 knots (28 km/h; 17 mph)	2 × 15 cm (5.9 in)	6	62	1916	
Type U-151	Germany	1,512 tons	1,875 tons	12 knots (22 km/h; 14 mph)	2 × 15 cm (5.9 in)	6	56	1917	
HMS X1	United Kingdom	2,780 tons	3,600 tons	19 knots (35 km/h; 22 mph)	4 × 5.2 in (13 cm)	6	110	1923	
Type J	Japan	2,135 tons	2,791 tons	18 knots (33 km/h; 21 mph)	2 × 14 cm (5.5 in)/40 caliber	6	80	1926	
Narwhal-class	United States	2,730 tons	4,050 tons	17 knots (31 km/h; 20 mph)	2 × 6"/53 caliber	6	90	1928	
Ettore Fieramosca	Kingdom of Italy	1,530 tons	2,094 tons	15 knots (28 km/h; 17 mph)	1 × 12cm (4.7 in) 45 caliber	14	78	1929	.
Surcouf	France	3,250 tons	4,304 tons	18 knots (33 km/h; 21 mph)	2 × 203mm (8in) 50 caliber	10	118	1934	
Type IXD2	Germany	1,616 tons	1,804 tons	19 knots (35 km/h; 22 mph)	1 × 10.5 cm (4.1 in)	6	57	1938	
K class	Soviet Union	1,490 tons	2,104 tons	22.5 knots (41.7 km/h; 25.9 mph)	2 × 10 cm (3.9 in)	10	67	1939	
Type B	Japan	2,584 tons	3,654 tons	23 knots (43 km/h; 26 mph)	1 × 14 cm (5.5 in)/40 caliber	6	100	1940	
Cagni class	Italy	1,461 tons	2,136 tons	18 knots (33 km/h; 21 mph)	2 × 10 cm (3.9 in)	14	85	1940	
Type A	Japan	3,603 tons	4,762 tons	16 knots (30 km/h; 18 mph)	1 × 14 cm (5.5 in)/40 caliber	6	100	1944	

== Sources ==
- Blair, Clay (1996). Hitler's U-Boat War. Vol. The Hunters 1939-1942. New York: Random House. ISBN 0-394-58839-8.
- Gray, Edwyn A. (1972). The Killing Time. New York: Charles Scribner's Sons.
- Kafka, Roger; Pepperburg, Roy L. (1946). Warships of the World. New York: Cornell Maritime Press.
- le Masson, Henri (1969). Navies of the Second World War. Vol. The French Navy 1. Garden City, New York: Doubleday & Company.
- Lenton, H.T. (1976). German Warships of the Second World War. New York: Arco Publishing Company. ISBN 0-668-04037-8.
- Lenton, H.T.; Colledge, J.J. (1964). British and Dominion Warships of World War II. Garden City, New York: Doubleday & Company.
- Potter, E.B.; Nimitz, Chester W. (1960). Sea Power. Englewood Cliffs, New Jersey: Prentice-Hall.
- Silverstone, Paul H. (1968). U.S. Warships of World War II. Garden City, New York: Doubleday & Company.
- Tarrant, V.E. (1989). The U-Boat Offensive 1914-1945. London: Cassell & Company. ISBN 1-85409-520-X.
- Taylor, J.C. (1966). German Warships of World War II. Garden City, New York: Doubleday & Company.
- Watts, Anthony J. (1966). Japanese Warships of World War II. Garden City, New York: Doubleday & Company.
