= Brendan Whiting =

Australian author and researcher

Brendan Whiting (31 January 1935 – 2 January 2009, Sydney, Australia) was an Australian author and researcher, who wrote non-fiction books.

Whiting was born in Australia, and lost his father during the Second World War when he was 6 years old. His first book, Ship of Courage, was about the Australian cruiser HMAS Perth, on which his father died. The ship was sunk by the Japanese in 1942 during the Battle of Sunda Strait. In that book, Whiting focused on the lives of the crew, rather than providing military details of the battle itself.

His second book, Victims of Tyranny, gave an account of the lives of the Irish rebels, the Fitzgerald convict brothers who were sent to help open up the north of Van Diemen's Land in 1805, under the leadership of the explorer Colonel William Paterson. It discussed the cruelty of the transportation system that the Irish rebels were subjected to and how the brothers eventually won their freedom.

Much of the media publicity Whiting received was due to his last book, The Shroud Story in which he presented evidence disputing the validity of the 1988 carbon 14 dating tests on the Shroud of Turin.

== Views on the Shroud ==
Whiting believed the Shroud of Turin to be genuine and in The Shroud Story he wrote:

Like an epiphany, it seems science has kept resurrecting evidence that the shroud indeed dates back to the time of Christ, as if repeatedly defying those who have attempted to condemn it as a medieval fake.

Whiting argued that areas of cloth directly next to the tested samples retained a gum coating not found on any of the fibres from the main part of the Shroud. The coating seemed to be gum arabic routinely used during re-weaving repairs. Whiting also pointed out that chemist Raymond Rogers (who died in 2005) uncovered cotton fibres in the tested sample but not from samples taken from the main part of the Shroud during the 1973 examination. Rogers also found that the sample used for radiocarbon dating contained alizarin dye (utilized by re-weavers), whereas no dye of any form was found on any part of the original Shroud cloth. Whiting therefore reasoned that the carbon dated samples were from repair fabric used in the reweaving at a later date.

Given the atmosphere of controversy that has surrounded the many views on the Shroud of Turin, Whiting's book received a critical assessment by fellow researcher Ian Wilson, to which Whiting provided responses. For instance, Wilson argued that Rogers' theory has been refuted by Mechthild Flury-Lemberg at the 2005 Shroud conference, but Whiting disputed that statement.

Whiting was also a supporter of the writings of the Italian mystic Maria Valtorta, and referred to her book Poem of the Man God in his writings. Those references caused further debate between Whiting and Wilson.

== Books ==
- Ship of Courage: The Epic Story of Hmas Perth and Her Crew, Allen & Unwin, 1995, ISBN 1-86373-653-0
- Victims of Tyranny: The Story of the Fitzgerald Convict Brothers, Harbour Publishing, 2004, ISBN 0-646-43345-8
- The Shroud Story, Harbour Publishing, 2006, ISBN 0-646-45725-X
