= HMAS Waller =

1997 Collins-class submarine

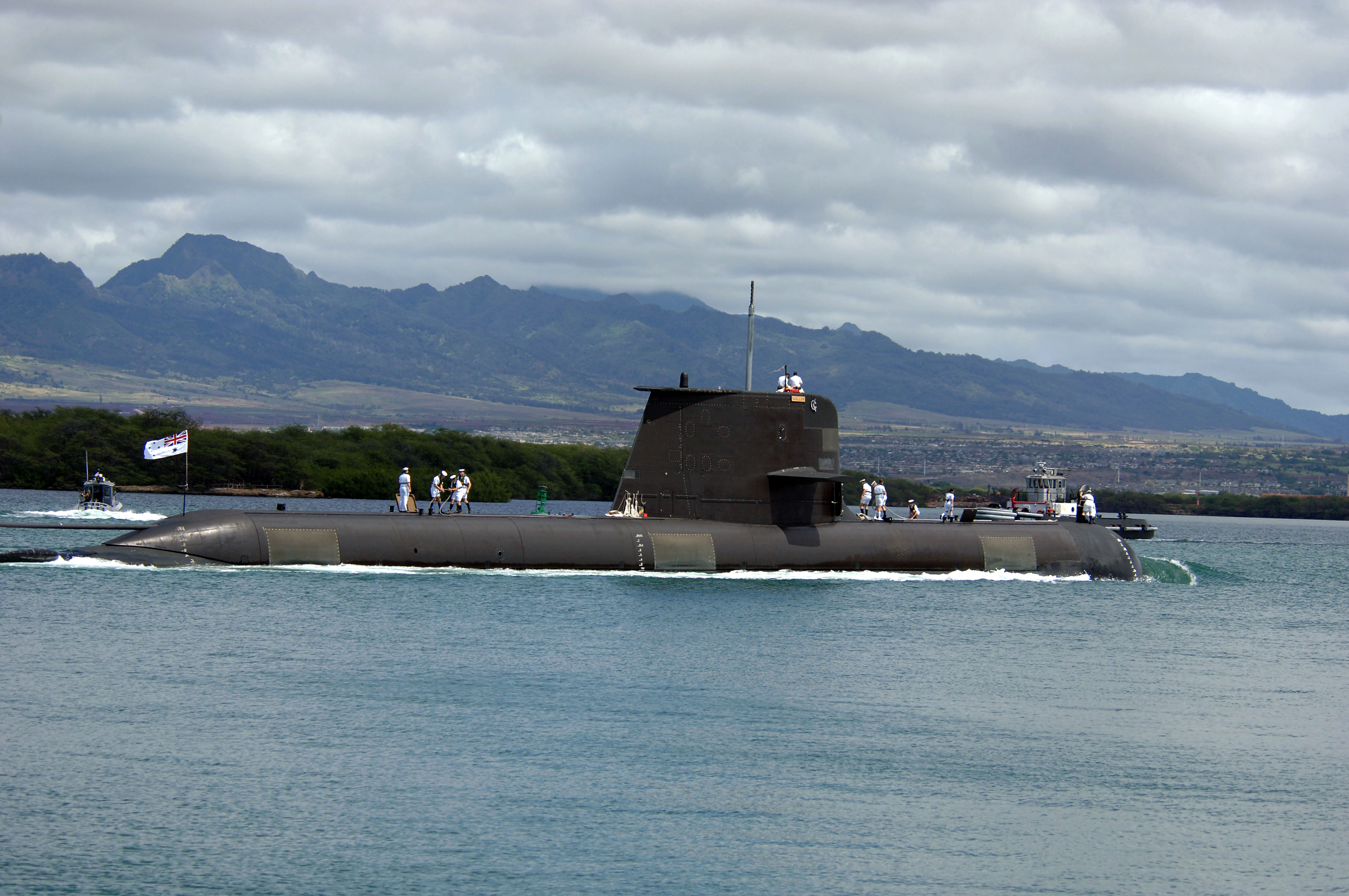
- HMAS Waller entering Pearl Harbor in 2008

History

Australia
- Name: Waller
- Namesake: Captain Hector Waller
- Builder: Australian Submarine Corporation, Osborne
- Laid down: 19 March 1992
- Launched: 14 March 1997
- Commissioned: 10 July 1999
- Home port: Fleet Base West, Perth
- Motto: "Tenacity"
- Status: Active as of 2016
- Badge

General characteristics
- Class & type: Collins-class submarine
- Displacement: 3,051 tonnes (surfaced); 3,353 tonnes (submerged)
- Length: 77.42 m (254.0 ft)
- Beam: 7.8 m (26 ft)
- Draught: 7 m (23 ft) at waterline
- Installed power: 3 × Garden Island-Hedemora HV V18b/15Ub (VB210) 18-cylinder diesel motors, 3 × Jeumont-Schneider generators (1,400 kW, 440-volt DC)
- Propulsion: Main: 1 × Jeumont-Schneider DC motor (7,200 shp), driving 1 × seven-bladed, 4.22 m (13.8 ft) diameter skewback propeller; Emergency: 1 × MacTaggart Scott DM 43006 retractable hydraulic motor
- Speed: 10.5 knots (19.4 km/h; 12.1 mph) (surfaced and snorkel depth); 21 knots (39 km/h; 24 mph) (submerged)
- Range: 11,000 nautical miles (20,000 km; 13,000 mi) at 10 knots (19 km/h; 12 mph) (surfaced); 9,000 nautical miles (17,000 km; 10,000 mi) at 10 knots (19 km/h; 12 mph) (snorkel); 32.6 nautical miles (60.4 km; 37.5 mi) at 21 knots (39 km/h; 24 mph) (submerged); 480 nautical miles (890 km; 550 mi) at 4 knots (7.4 km/h; 4.6 mph) (submerged)
- Endurance: 70 days
- Test depth: Over 180 m (590 ft) (actual depth classified)
- Complement: Originally 42 (plus up to 12 trainees); Increased to 58 in 2009
- Sensors & processing systems: Radar: GEC-Marconi Type 1007 surface search radar; Sonar: Thales Scylla bow and distributed sonar arrays; Thales Karriwarra or Namara towed sonar array; ArgoPhoenix AR-740-US intercept array; Periscopes: Thales CK043 Search Periscope; Thales CH093 Attack Periscope; Combat system: Modified Raytheon CCS Mk2
- Armament: 6 × 21-inch (530 mm) bow torpedo tubes; Payload: 22 torpedoes, mix of: Mark 48 Mod 7 CBASS torpedoes; UGM-84C Sub-Harpoon anti-ship missiles; Or: 44 Stonefish Mark III mines
- Notes: The sonars and combat system are in the process of being updated across the class, to be completed by 2010. These characteristics represent the updated equipment.

HMAS Waller (SSG 75) is the third of six Collins-class submarines operated by the Royal Australian Navy (RAN).

Named for Captain Hector Waller, the boat was laid down in 1992, and launched in 1997. Despite the RAN initially refusing to accept the submarine for service, Waller has demonstrated the capabilities of the Collins class against surface and submarine targets during several international war-games.

== Construction ==
Waller was laid down by Australian Submarine Corporation (ASC) on 19 March 1992, launched on 14 March 1997, and commissioned into the RAN on 10 July 1999. During sea trials, the number of problems and defects with Waller were significantly fewer that with the previous two submarines, indicating that problems with earlier submarines were being fixed in the latter boats during construction.

Despite this, the RAN initially refused to accept Waller into service until all defects in the submarine were repaired, unlike Collins and Farncomb, which had been provisionally accepted while defects were fixed. Although ASC believed that all problems with Waller had been rectified, the Defence Acquisition Organisation refused to accept the boat. In response, ASC began to charge the Australian Government A$100,000 a day over contract for the delays. Despite legal opinion being that ASC did not have the right to make that claim, the Government eventually paid half of what was claimed.

Waller was named for Captain Hector Waller, who commanded the five-ship 'Scrap Iron Flotilla' from 1940 to 1941, then commanded the cruiser HMAS Perth until his death and the ship's loss on 1 March 1942 during the Battle of Sunda Strait.

== Characteristics ==
The Collins class is an enlarged version of the Kockums Västergötland class submarine. At 77.42 metres (254.0 ft) in length, with a beam of 7.8 metres (26 ft) and a waterline depth of 7 metres (23 ft), displacing 3,051 tonnes when surfaced, and 3,353 tonnes when submerged, they are the largest conventionally powered submarines in the world. The hull is constructed from high-tensile micro-alloy steel, and are covered in a skin of anechoic tiles to minimise detection by sonar. The depth that they can dive to is classified: most sources claim that it is over 180 metres (590 ft),

The submarine is armed with six 21-inch (530 mm) torpedo tubes, and carry a standard payload of 22 torpedoes: originally a mix of Gould Mark 48 Mod 4 torpedoes and UGM-84C Sub-Harpoon, with the Mark 48s later upgraded to the Mod 7 Common Broadband Advanced Sonar System (CBASS) version.

Each submarine is equipped with three Garden Island-Hedemora HV V18b/15Ub (VB210) 18-cylinder diesel engines, which are each connected to a 1,400 kW, 440-volt DC Jeumont-Schneider generator. The electricity generated is stored in batteries, then supplied to a single Jeumont-Schneider DC motor, which provides 7,200 shaft horsepower to a single, seven-bladed, 4.22-metre (13.8 ft) diameter skewback propeller. The Collins class has a speed of 10.5 knots (19.4 km/h; 12.1 mph) when surfaced and at snorkel depth, and can reach 21 knots (39 km/h; 24 mph) underwater. The submarines have a range of 11,000 nautical miles (20,000 km; 13,000 mi) at 10 knots (19 km/h; 12 mph) when surfaced, 9,000 nautical miles (17,000 km; 10,000 mi) at 10 knots (19 km/h; 12 mph) at snorkel depth. When submerged completely, a Collins-class submarine can travel 32.6 nautical miles (60.4 km; 37.5 mi) at maximum speed, or 480 nautical miles (890 km; 550 mi) at 4 knots (7.4 km/h; 4.6 mph). Each boat has an endurance of 70 days.

== Operational history ==
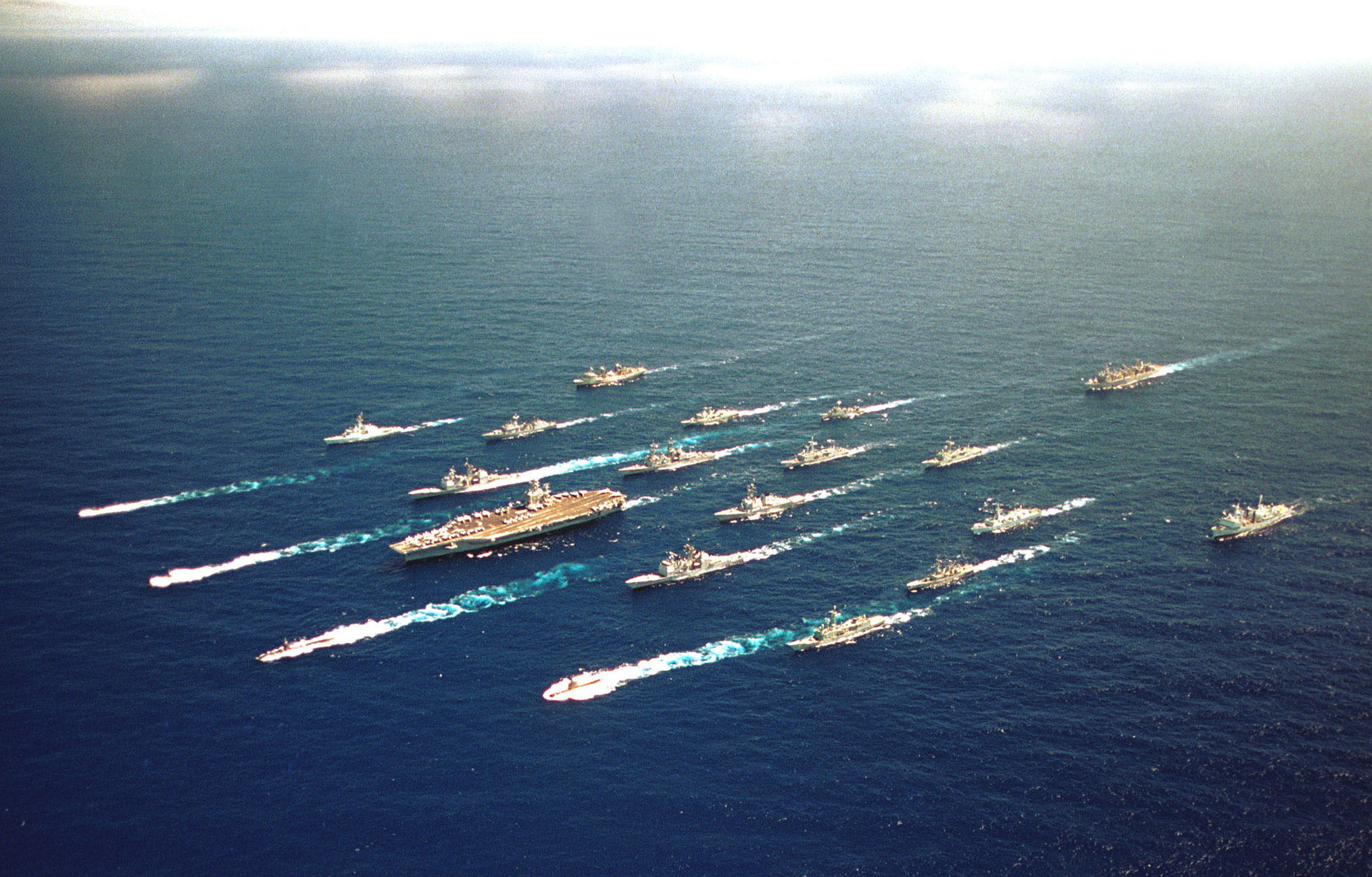
The USS Abraham Lincoln battle group underway in June 2000. Waller operated with this force during late May 2000, becoming the first Australian submarine to be integrated into a United States Navy carrier battle group.

In 1999, Waller reportedly operated in the International Force East Timor (INTERFET) together with a second Collins-class boat providing escorts for transport ships and monitoring Indonesian communications. Waller had overtly docked in Darwin during the international naval buildup in September shortly before the Force sailed to East Timor.

In late May 2000, Waller became the first Australian submarine to operate as a fully integrated component of a United States Navy carrier battle group during wargames. Waller’s role was to search for and engage opposing submarines hunting the aircraft carrier USS Abraham Lincoln, a role in which she performed better than expected. A few days later, as part of the RIMPAC 2000 exercise, Waller was assigned to act as an 'enemy' submarine, and was reported to have successfully engaged two USN nuclear submarines before coming into attacking range of Abraham Lincoln. Waller performed similarly during the Operation Tandem Thrust wargames in 2001, when she 'sank' two USN amphibious assault ships in waters just over 70 metres (230 ft) deep; although the submarine was 'destroyed' herself later in the exercise.

During a multinational exercise in September 2003, which was attended by Waller and sister boat Rankin, Waller successfully "sank" a Los Angeles-class nuclear submarine, prompting claims from the USN that diesel submarines like the Collins class are one of the major threats facing modern navies.

In 2006, the Mark 48 torpedoes carried by the Collins class were upgraded to the Mod 7 Common Broadband Advanced Sonar System (CBASS) version, which had been jointly developed with the United States Navy. Waller was the first vessel of either navy to fire an armed version of the torpedo, sinking the decommissioned Spruance-class destroyer USS Fletcher on 16 July 2008, during RIMPAC 08.

In early 2009, battery problems aboard Waller forced the submarine to undergo emergency maintenance. This, combined with other factors affecting Waller’s sister boats, left HMAS Farncomb as the only operational submarine in Australian service as of mid-2009. The boat was returned to service during the end of the year, but maintenance delays and malfunctions aboard other submarines during early 2010, meant that Waller was the only fully operational submarine during February and March 2010.

Waller was undergoing deep maintenance during 2012, and was due to return to service in 2013.

On 27 February 2014, a fire broke out aboard the submarine while she was surfaced off the Western Australian coast. The fire was extinguished by those aboard, and there were no injuries, although four personnel who fought the fire directly were taken ashore for medical observation. Waller was docked for repairs, which were due to be completed by the end of 2015, with the submarine returning to full operational status in mid-2016.

Waller was damaged by two fires in an auxiliary machine space on 8 April 2021. At the time the submarine was alongside at HMAS Stirling. Repairs were completed in September 2021.

In June 2022, Vice-Admiral Michael Noonan smuggled a civilian on board, his girlfriend, for an overnight trip and proposed marriage to her.
