= Hector Waller =

Royal Australian Navy officer (1900–1942)

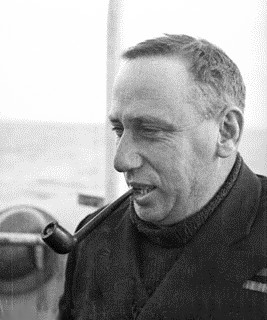
- Waller on the bridge of HMAS Stuart in 1940
- Born: 4 April 1900; Benalla, Victoria
- Died: 1 March 1942 (aged 41); HMAS Perth in the Sunda Strait
- Military career
- Allegiance: Australia
- Branch: Royal Australian Navy
- Service years: 1913–1942
- Rank: Captain
- Nickname: "Hard Over Hec"
- Commands: HMS Brazen (1937–39); HMAS Stuart (1939–41); 10th Destroyer Flotilla (1940–41); HMAS Perth (1941–42)
- Conflicts: World War I; Spanish Civil War; World War II; Mediterranean theatre; Battle of Calabria; Operation Lustre; Battle of Cape Matapan; South West Pacific theatre; Battle of the Java Sea; Battle of Sunda Strait †
- Awards: Distinguished Service Order & Bar; Mentioned in Despatches (3)

Hector Macdonald Laws Waller, DSO & Bar (4 April 1900 – 1 March 1942) was a senior officer in the Royal Australian Navy (RAN). His career spanned almost thirty years, including service in both world wars. At the helm of the flotilla leader HMAS Stuart in the Mediterranean from 1939 to 1941, he won recognition as a skilful ship's captain and flotilla commander. He then transferred to the South West Pacific as captain of the light cruiser HMAS Perth, and went down with his ship during the Battle of Sunda Strait in early 1942.

Born in Benalla, Victoria, Waller entered the Royal Australian Naval College aged thirteen. After graduating, he served with the Royal Navy in the closing stages of World War I. Between the wars, he specialised in communications and was posted as signals officer to several British and Australian warships. He gained his first seagoing command in 1937, as captain of the destroyer HMS Brazen. In September 1939, he took command of HMAS Stuart and four other obsolete destroyers that together became known as the "Scrap Iron Flotilla". In 1940, these were augmented by other ships to form the 10th Destroyer Flotilla, supporting Allied troops in North Africa.

Waller was awarded the Distinguished Service Order and Bar, and twice mentioned in despatches, for his achievements in the Mediterranean. He assumed command of HMAS Perth in October 1941, taking part in the Battle of the Java Sea shortly before his final action in Sunda Strait. He received a third mention in despatches posthumously, and in 2011 came under formal consideration for the award of the Victoria Cross for his performance as Perth's captain. The submarine HMAS Waller is named in his honour.

== Early life and World War I ==
Born on 4 April 1900 in Benalla, Victoria, Hector Macdonald Laws Waller was the son of William Frederick Waller, a grocer, and his wife Helen Waller (née Duncan). Hec Waller was named in honour of General Hector MacDonald, hero of the Boer War, and a forebear called Laws who was an admiral and a contemporary of Viscount Nelson. The youngest of ten children, of whom eight survived infancy, he attended Benalla Higher Elementary School.

Waller entered the Royal Australian Naval College (RANC) as a cadet midshipman on 31 December 1913, aged thirteen. He gained recognition as a rugby player and became cadet captain. In 1917, his final year at the college, he was raised to chief cadet captain and won the King's Medal, awarded for "gentlemanly bearing, character, good influence among his fellows and officer-like qualities". Promoted to midshipman on 1 January 1918, he was posted to Britain where, in April, he was appointed to serve in the Royal Navy's (RN) Grand Fleet with the dreadnought HMS Agincourt. The ship did not see combat while he was on board.

== Between the wars ==
In February 1919, Waller was assigned to the light cruiser HMAS Melbourne, and two months later returned to Australia. He transferred to the light cruiser HMAS Sydney as an acting sub-lieutenant in September; his rank was made substantive the following month. In April 1920 he was again posted aboard Melbourne. Promoted to lieutenant in March 1921, he underwent further training in Britain before returning to join the staff of the RANC. Waller married Nancy Bowes, a minister's daughter, on 7 April 1923 in the Sydney suburb of Lewisham; the couple had two sons, Michael and John. In April 1924, he was posted to the light cruiser HMAS Adelaide. Later that year, he began training as a signals officer in England; his classmates included Lord Louis Mountbatten. Waller finished at the top of the advanced course and, in May 1926, took charge of the Signals and Wireless-Telegraphy School at Flinders Naval Depot in Westernport, Victoria. From 1928 to 1930, he served with the RN as a signals officer aboard the destroyer HMS Broke. He was promoted to lieutenant commander in March 1929.

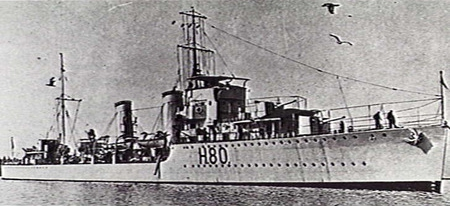
HMS Brazen, Waller's first command at sea

By this stage of his career, Waller had acquired a strong reputation for his communications work. In July 1930, he was posted aboard the Royal Australian Navy's (RAN) flagship, the heavy cruiser HMAS Australia, as squadron signals officer. He continued in this role upon transferring to Australia's sister ship, HMAS Canberra, in May 1931. In early 1932, he was assigned to the Navy Office in Melbourne, returning to Canberra as squadron signals officer in August 1933. He was promoted to commander in June 1934 and the following month became executive officer of the RANC. Departing the college in July 1936, he returned to England and spent six months in the British Naval Intelligence Division. A stint as executive officer of the repair ship HMS Resource followed. In November 1937, Waller was given his first command at sea, the RN destroyer HMS Brazen. His ship handling was criticised early on, but was soon reported by his superiors as having "improved greatly". Stationed in the Mediterranean, Brazen monitored progress of the Spanish Civil War, a duty that included protecting British merchant vessels and rescuing the crews of sinking ships. By June 1939, Waller had returned to Australia to become Director of Signals and Communications at the Navy Office.

== World War II ==
=== HMAS Stuart in the Mediterranean ===
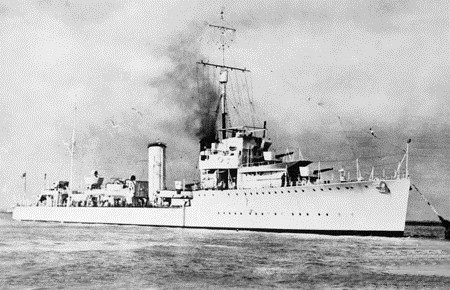
HMAS Stuart, pictured in 1938, came under Waller's command when World War II began.

At the outbreak of World War II, Waller was appointed captain of HMAS Stuart, taking charge of a group of four other obsolete ex-RN destroyers—HMA Ships Vampire, Vendetta, Voyager, and Waterhen—that the Germans later nicknamed the "Scrap Iron Flotilla". The ships were en route to Singapore for training when the British and Australian governments agreed that they should be assigned to the Mediterranean as the 19th Destroyer Division, under Waller's control. Arriving at Malta in late December, Waller made a positive initial impression on senior RN commanders; this was soon borne out by his actions during the salvage of the Trocas, a disabled tanker. In May 1940, he was appointed to command the 10th Destroyer Flotilla, which included the vessels of the "Scrap Iron Flotilla" plus four modern British destroyers, and a month later was promoted to captain.

Following Italy's entry into the war on 10 June 1940, Waller was involved in the search for minefields off the North African coast. A keen shooter, he blew up floating mines using a rifle and armour-piercing bullets. On 21 June, Stuart shelled the Italian-held town of Bardia. The next month, his 10th Destroyer Flotilla participated in the Battle of Calabria. Waller's ships carried out bombardments of Fort Capuzzo on 17 August and an Italian seaplane base in the Gulf of Bomba one week later. In September, he was awarded the Distinguished Service Order (DSO) for "courage, enterprise, and devotion to duty on recent engagements"—in particular, his pinpointing of enemy minefields. The same month, he transferred to HMAS Vampire while Stuart went in for refit. As the Allied armies began to counterattack Italian forces in December 1940, the Commander-in-Chief of the Mediterranean Fleet, Admiral Sir Andrew Cunningham, gave Waller command of the new Inshore Squadron, comprising destroyers, minesweepers, and auxiliaries. In his role as Cunningham's Senior Officer Afloat, Waller took charge of naval support for the Battle of Bardia, which fell to the Allies on 5 January 1941. Shortly afterwards, he handed over command of the Inshore Squadron and returned to Stuart.

The cooks & stewards nicknamed Waller 'Hard Over Hec' as most of his wheel orders, in action, were 'Hard a Stbd or Hard a Port'. Waller would lay back in his chair, with pipe in mouth, on the bridge and actually wait for the dive-bombers to release their bombs before ordering the wheel hard over one way or the other!

— Crewman quoted by historian Tom Lewis

Stuart and other ships of Waller's 10th Destroyer Flotilla supported the assaults on Tobruk in January 1941 and Benghazi the following month. In March, Stuart escorted Allied troop transports to Greece as part of Operation Lustre, narrowly avoiding falling victim to Axis dive-bomber attacks. During the Battle of Cape Matapan at the end of the month, Waller's ships were credited with sinking two Italian destroyers. From May to July, the 10th Destroyer Flotilla made 139 ferry runs during the siege of Tobruk, carrying supplies to the town's garrison and evacuating the wounded. Waller was mentioned in despatches twice during 1941: in July for his army cooperation role with the Inshore Squadron off the Libyan coast, and in November for his service during the Greek campaign. In January 1942, he was awarded a Bar to his DSO for "bravery and enterprise in the Battle of Cape Matapan".

Waller earned the personal admiration of Admiral Cunningham, who described him as "one of the finest types of Australian naval officers ... greatly loved and admired by everyone". On the occasion of a visit to Alexandria by Australian Prime Minister Robert Menzies, Cunningham escorted him to Stuart and declared: "And now you are going to meet one of the greatest captains who ever sailed the seas—his name is Waller". According to author Ray Parkin, who began writing while a prisoner of war, "Andrew Cunningham and Hector Waller were cast in the same mould: men would follow them, suffer, and be glad about it. These were both men made by Fate for those ever-recurring Saint Crispin's Days of human affairs".

=== HMAS Perth and the Battle of Sunda Strait ===
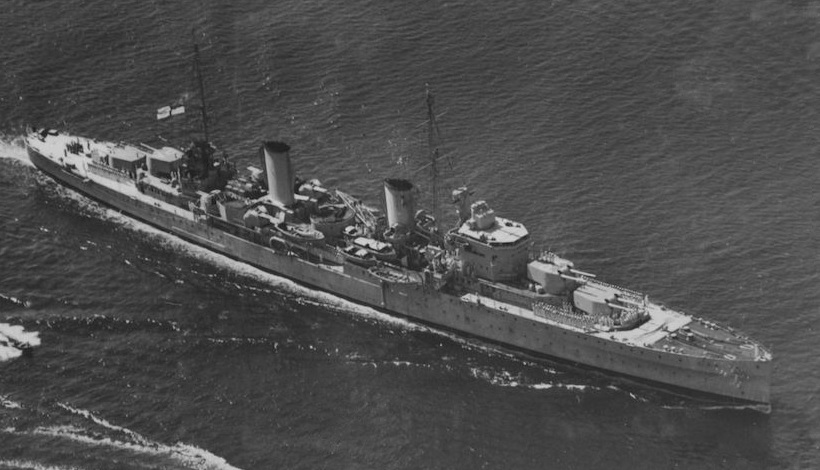
HMAS Perth, Waller's final command

Departing the Mediterranean, Waller returned to Australia in August 1941 for service in the South West Pacific. On 24 October, he took command of the light cruiser HMAS Perth, berthed in Sydney. Perth had also lately returned from action in the Mediterranean, where she had participated in the Greek, Cretan, and Syrian campaigns, and been damaged on two occasions by German bombers. Waller was reportedly "tired" and "quite a sick man" at this time but nonetheless prepared Perth for action quickly. In January 1942, the ship was assigned to American-British-Dutch-Australian Command (ABDA) to help defend the Dutch East Indies. She set sail for the ABDA Area on 15 February, the day that Singapore surrendered.

The ABDA Striking Force that Perth had joined was crushed by an overwhelming Japanese force at the Battle of the Java Sea on 27 February. Low on ammunition, Waller made the decision to withdraw, accompanied by the heavy cruiser USS Houston under the command of Captain Albert H. Rooks. Waller's action contravened the orders of his Dutch superior, Admiral Conrad Helfrich, to "continue action whatever the cost, and till the bitter end", but the Australian was convinced that further engagement would mean pointless sacrifice.

On the following night, 28 February, Perth and Houston were attempting to break through the Sunda Strait to Australia when they encountered a Japanese invasion fleet escorted by an aircraft carrier, a seaplane tender, four heavy cruisers, a light cruiser and eleven destroyers. As senior officer, Waller was in the lead with Perth and gave the order to fire upon making contact with the enemy ships just after 11:00 pm. In the ensuing battle, the Allied cruisers sank four Japanese transports and a minesweeper before they themselves were sunk, shortly after midnight on 1 March 1942. Having fought to the last of its ammunition, Perth was struck by two torpedoes, losing over 350 of its complement of 680 as it keeled over. According to witnesses, Waller was last seen standing on the bridge after he had given the order to abandon ship, "looking down at the silent turrets". He was officially listed as missing, presumed killed, and was survived by his wife and sons. Admiral Cunningham described Waller's loss as "a heavy deprivation for the young Navy of Australia", and Rear Admiral James Goldrick subsequently called him "the outstanding officer of his generation".

== Legacy ==
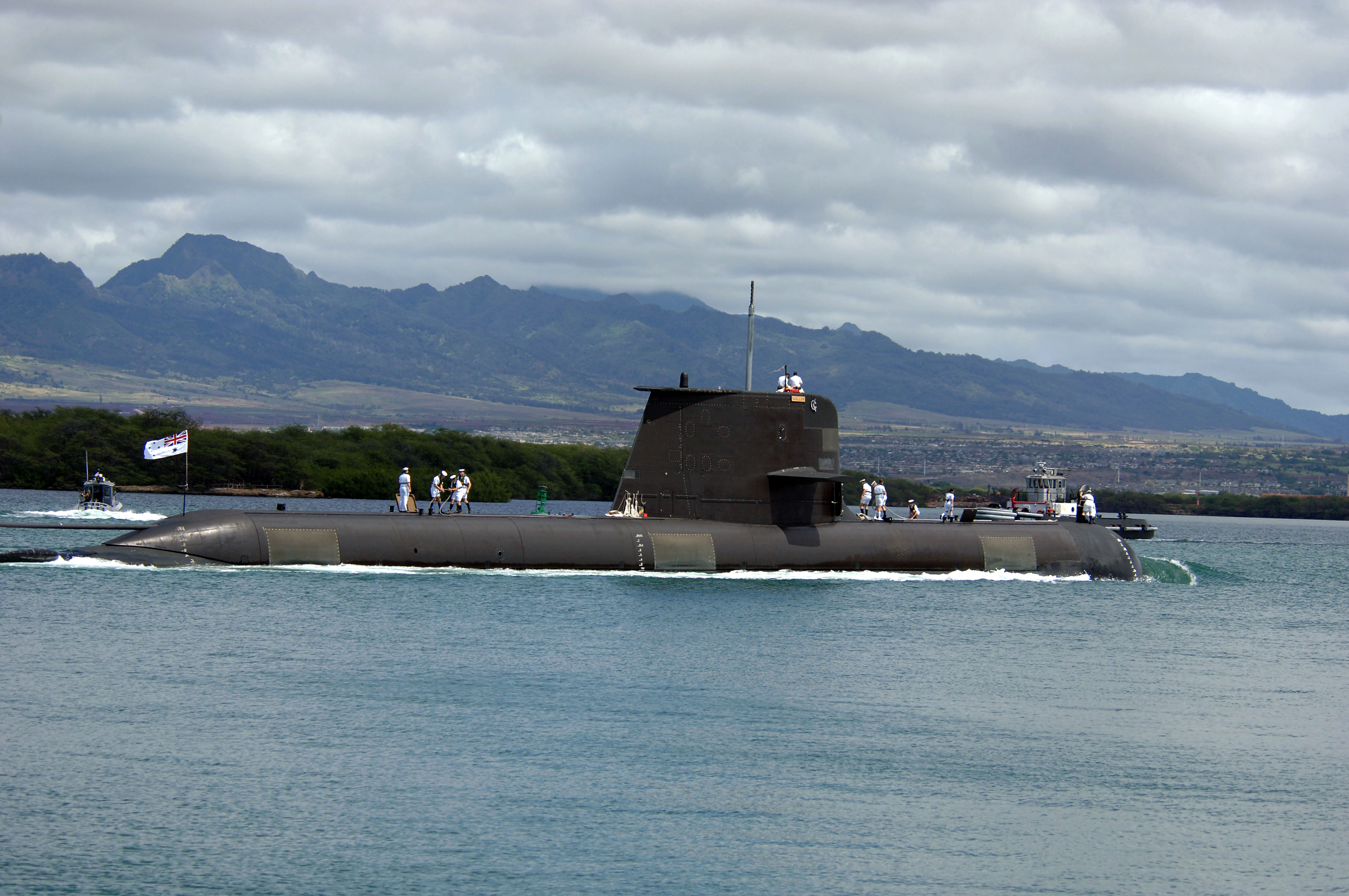
HMAS Waller in 2008

On 15 March 1946, Waller was awarded a posthumous mention in despatches for "gallantry and resolution" aboard HMAS Perth. His younger son John followed him into the Navy, entering the RANC in 1947. Graduating as chief cadet captain, John Waller became a weapons electrical engineer and attained the rank of commander in 1967, before transferring to the Emergency Reserve as a senior Navy research scientist.

Hec Waller's name appears on the Roll of Honour located at Panel 6 for World War II in the Commemorative Area at the Australian War Memorial, Canberra, and on the Plymouth Naval Memorial in Devon, England. He is also commemorated by Waller Crescent and Waller Place in the Canberra suburb of Campbell. The Benalla Costume and Pioneer Museum holds his medals and dress uniform. The Waller Division of the RAN Recruit School at HMAS Cerberus, Victoria, was named in his honour until his name transferred to a division at RAN College in 2013.

HMAS Waller, the third of the RAN's Collins-class submarines to enter service, was commissioned on 10 July 1999. The attendees included Michael Waller, John Waller, Michael Waller's wife, and surviving crewmen of HMAS Perth. On 13 March 2010, a memorial to Waller was unveiled in his home town of Benalla. In April 2011, he was one of thirteen servicemen—eleven sailors and two soldiers, including Teddy Sheean, Robert Rankin, and John Simpson Kirkpatrick—named by the Australian government for consideration as recipients of the Victoria Cross for Australia for extreme valour in combat, under a review by the Defence Honours and Awards Appeals Tribunal; no RAN member had ever been awarded the decoration. Concluding its investigations in February 2013, the tribunal recommended that no further award be made to any of the thirteen servicemen, but that the name Waller (among others) should continue to be used for RAN ships after the current bearer was decommissioned.
