= Japanese destroyer Hatakaze (1924) =

Destroyer of the Imperial Japanese Navy

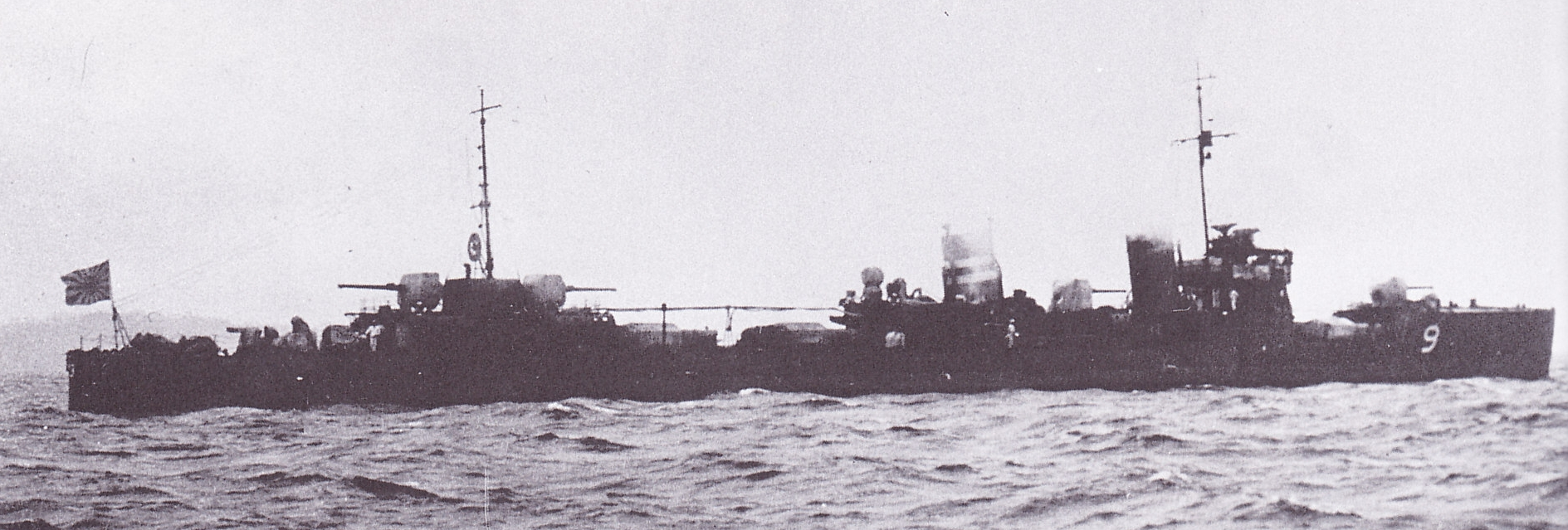
- Hatakaze off Mako, 1924

History

Empire of Japan
- Name: Hatakaze; (はたかぜ)
- Builder: Maizuru Naval Arsenal
- Laid down: 3 July 1923
- Launched: 15 March 1924
- Completed: 30 August 1924
- Renamed: Destroyer No. 9 (1923-1928)
- Stricken: 10 March 1945
- Fate: Sunk by aircraft, 15 January 1945

General characteristics
- Class & type: Kamikaze-class destroyer
- Displacement: 1,422 t (1,400 long tons) (normal); 1,747 t (1,719 long tons) (deep load)
- Length: 97.5 m (319 ft 11 in) (pp); 102.5 m (336 ft 3 in) (o/a)
- Beam: 9.1 m (29 ft 10 in)
- Draft: 2.9 m (9 ft 6 in)
- Installed power: 38,500 shp (28,700 kW); 4 × Kampon water-tube boilers
- Propulsion: 2 shafts; 2 × Kampon geared steam turbines
- Speed: 37.3 knots (69.1 km/h; 42.9 mph)
- Range: 3,600 nmi (6,700 km; 4,100 mi) at 14 knots (26 km/h; 16 mph)
- Complement: 148
- Armament: 4 × single 12 cm (4.7 in) Type 3 guns; 3 × twin 53.3 cm (21.0 in) torpedo tubes

Service record
- Operations: Battle of the Philippines; Battle of Sunda Strait

The Japanese destroyer Hatakaze (旗風, ”Flag Wind”) was one of nine Kamikaze-class destroyers built for the Imperial Japanese Navy (IJN) during the 1920s. During the Pacific War, she participated in the Philippines Campaign in December 1941 and the Dutch East Indies Campaign in early 1942. She took part in the Battle of Sunda Strait in March and helped to sink two Allied cruisers.

== Design and description ==
The Kamikaze class was an improved version of the Minekaze-class destroyers. The ships had an overall length of 102.5 meters (336 ft 3 in) and were 97.5 meters (319 ft 11 in) between perpendiculars. They had a beam of 9.1 meters (29 ft 10 in), and a mean draft of 2.9 meters (9 ft 6 in). The Kamikaze-class ships displaced 1,422 metric tons (1,400 long tons) at standard load and 1,747 metric tons (1,719 long tons) at deep load. They were powered by two Parsons geared steam turbines, each driving one propeller shaft, using steam provided by four Kampon water-tube boilers. The turbines were designed to produce 38,500 shaft horsepower (28,700 kW), which would propel the ships at 37.3 knots (69.1 km/h; 42.9 mph). During sea trials, the ships comfortably exceeded their designed speeds, reaching 38.7 to 39.2 knots (71.7 to 72.6 km/h; 44.5 to 45.1 mph). The ships carried 420 metric tons (413 long tons) of fuel oil which gave them a range of 3,600 nautical miles (6,700 km; 4,100 mi) at 14 knots (26 km/h; 16 mph). Their crew consisted of 148 officers and crewmen.

The main armament of the Kamikaze-class ships consisted of four 12-centimeter (4.7 in) Type 3 guns in single mounts; one gun forward of the superstructure, one between the two funnels and the last pair back to back atop the aft superstructure. The guns were numbered '1' to '4' from front to rear. The ships carried three above-water twin sets of 53.3-centimeter (21.0 in) torpedo tubes; one mount was between the forward superstructure and the forward gun and the other two were between the aft funnel and aft superstructure.

Early in the war, the No. 4 gun and the aft torpedo tubes were removed in exchange for four depth charge throwers and 18 depth charges. In addition 10 license-built 25 mm (0.98 in) Type 96 light AA guns were installed. These changes increased their displacement to 1,499 long tons (1,523 t). Survivors had their light AA armament augmented to be between thirteen and twenty 25 mm guns and four 13.2 mm (0.5 in) Type 93 anti-aircraft machineguns by June 1944. These changes reduced their speed to 35 knots (65 km/h; 40 mph).

== Construction and career ==
Hatakaze, built at the Maizuru Naval Arsenal, was laid down on 3 July 1923, launched on 15 March 1924 and completed on 30 August 1924. Originally commissioned simply as Destroyer No. 9, the ship was assigned the name Hatakaze on 1 August 1928.

=== Pacific War ===
At the time of the attack on Pearl Harbor on 7 December 1941, Hatakaze was part of Destroyer Division 5 under Destroyer Squadron 5 of the IJN 3rd Fleet, and deployed from Mako Guard District in the Pescadores as part of the Japanese invasion force for the Operation M (the invasion of the Philippines), during which time it helped screen landings of Japanese forces at Aparri.

In early 1942, Hatakaze was assigned to escorting troop convoys to Singora, Malaya and French Indochina. Assigned to Operation J (the invasion of Java in the Netherlands East Indies), she participated at the Battle of Sunda Strait on 1 March 1942. During that battle, she launched torpedoes at the cruisers HMAS Perth and USS Houston.

From 10 March 1942 Hatakaze and Destroyer Division 5 were reassigned to the Southwest Area Fleet and escorted troop convoys from Singapore to Penang, and Rangoon. From 5 May, she was reassigned back to the Yokosuka Naval District, where the destroyer served as a guard ship in Tokyo Bay until September. On 25 September, she escorted the aircraft carrier Unyō from Kure Naval Arsenal to Truk, and from there she escorted convoys on to Rabaul and back to Palau, returning to Yokosuka on 24 November to resume her duties as a guard ship.

However, on 2 March 1943, Hatakaze suffered an accidental explosion, which caused heavy damage to her stern. After repairs were completed, from October to December 1944, Hatakaze escorted convoys from Yokosuka to the Ogasawara Islands. In December, Hatakaze was reassigned to the IJN 5th Fleet, and on 25 December directly to the Combined Fleet.

At the end of December 1944, Hatakaze escorted a convoy from Moji, Kyūshū to Takao. While at Takao on 15 January, Hatakaze was sunk in an air raid by Task Force 38 carrier aircraft from USS Ticonderoga at coordinates 22°40′N 120°14′E. Hatakaze was struck from the Navy List on 10 March 1945.
