= HMAS Perth (D29) =

Light cruiser used by the Australian navy during WWII

Coordinates: 05°51′42″S 106°7′52″E

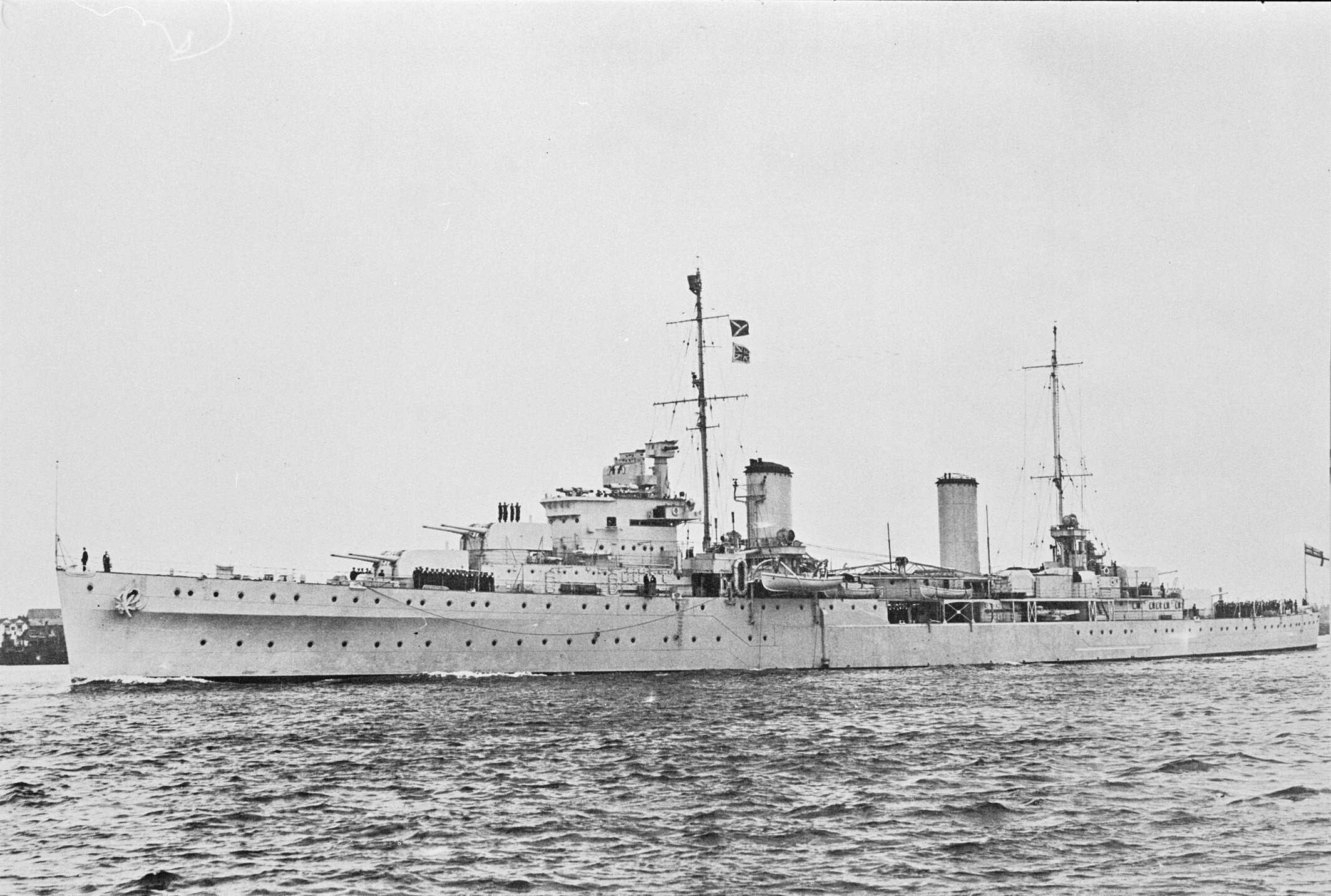
- Perth

History

United Kingdom
- Name: Amphion
- Namesake: Amphion
- Builder: HM Dockyard, Portsmouth
- Laid down: 26 June 1933
- Launched: 27 July 1934
- Commissioned: 15 June 1936
- Identification: Pennant number: I29
- Fate: Sold to Royal Australian Navy, June 1939

Australia
- Name: Perth
- Namesake: City of Perth, Western Australia
- Acquired: 1939
- Commissioned: 29 June 1939
- Identification: Pennant number: D29
- Motto: Floreat; (Latin: "Let it flourish")
- Honours and awards: Battle honours: Atlantic 1939; Malta Convoys 1941; Matapan 1941; Greece 1941; Crete 1941; Mediterranean 1941; Pacific 1941–42; Sunda Strait 1942
- Fate: Sunk during the Battle of Sunda Strait, 1 March 1942
- Badge

General characteristics (as completed)
- Class & type: Modified Leander-class light cruiser
- Displacement: 7,040 long tons (7,150 t) (standard)
- Length: 562 ft 4 in (171.4 m) (o/a); 530 ft (161.5 m) (p/p)
- Beam: 56 ft 8 in (17.3 m)
- Draught: 19 ft 5 in (5.9 m)
- Installed power: 4 × Admiralty 3-drum boilers; 72,000 shp (54,000 kW)
- Propulsion: 4 shafts; 4 × geared steam turbines
- Speed: 32.5 kn (60.2 km/h; 37.4 mph)
- Range: 7,000 nmi (13,000 km; 8,100 mi) at 16 knots (30 km/h; 18 mph)
- Complement: 622 (36 officers, 586 ratings)
- Armament: 4 × twin BL 6 in (152 mm) guns; 4 × single QF 4 in (102 mm) guns; 3 × quadruple 0.5 in (12.7 mm) AA machineguns; 2 × quadruple 21 in (533 mm) torpedo tubes
- Armour: Waterline belt: 3 in (76 mm); Magazine: 2–3.5 in (51–89 mm); Deck: 1.125 in (29 mm); Gun turrets: 1 in (25 mm)

HMAS Perth was one of three modified Leander-class light cruisers used by the Royal Australian Navy (RAN) during the early part of World War II. She was built for the Royal Navy (RN) in the mid-1930s and was commissioned as HMS Amphion in 1936. The ship spent the next several years as flagship of the Commander-in-Chief, Africa before she was transferred to the RAN in 1939 and renamed as HMAS Perth.

At the start of World War II in September, the ship patrolled the Western Atlantic and the Caribbean in search of German shipping and escorting convoys for six months before she was ordered home in early 1940. The ship continued the same types of duties in Australian waters before she was transferred to the Mediterranean Fleet at the end of 1940. Perth then helped to escort numerous convoys to Malta in early 1941 and played a minor role in the Battle of Cape Matapan in March. She escorted convoys to Greece and Crete and helped to evacuate Allied troops from both places in the face of the victorious Axis forces. The ship was badly damaged by Axis aircraft in May during the evacuation of Crete.

After repairs were completed in June, Perth provided naval gunfire support to Allied forces ashore during the Syria-Lebanon Campaign and bombarded Vichy French targets. She returned to Australia in mid-1941 and was tasked with the same sorts of missions as she had been performing at the beginning of the war. The ship continued to perform these tasks after the start of the Pacific War in December until she was transferred to the American-British-Dutch-Australian Command in February 1942 to help defend the Dutch East Indies against the Japanese. Perth was not damaged during the Battle of the Java Sea, but was torpedoed and sunk by the Imperial Japanese Navy at the Battle of Sunda Strait immediately afterwards.

Over half her crew was killed in the battle and only about two-thirds of the survivors survived captivity to return home after the war. The ship's wreck was discovered in 1967 and was essentially intact; by 2013 the wreck had been partially stripped by unauthorised Indonesian marine salvagers and was in even worse condition four years later.

== Design and description ==
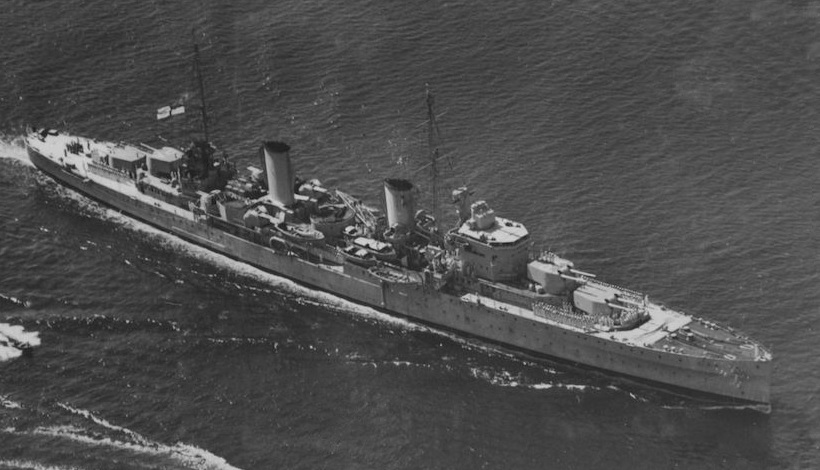
Aerial view of Perth in 1940

The design of the Leander-class cruisers was adapted for the 1932–1933 Naval Programme to separate their propulsion machinery arranged into separate units. This was intended to improve their survivability as each unit of paired boilers and steam turbines could operate independently and a single hit could not immobilise the ship. As built Amphion had an overall length of 562 feet 4 inches (171.4 m), a length between perpendiculars of 530 feet (161.5 m), a beam of 56 feet 8 inches (17.3 m), and a draught of 19 feet 5 inches (5.9 m) at deep load. The ship displaced 7,040 long tons (7,150 t) at standard load and 9,140 long tons (9,290 t) at deep load. This gave her a metacentric height of 4.5 ft (1.4 m) at deep load. Her crew numbered 36 officers and 586 ratings.

The modified Leanders were powered by four Parsons geared turbines, each driving one shaft, using steam provided by four Admiralty 3-drum boilers. The turbines, rated at 72,000 shaft horsepower (54,000 kW), were intended to give the ships a maximum speed of 32.5 knots (60.2 km/h; 37.4 mph) The unit system necessarily meant that each machinery unit had its own funnel. The ships carried enough fuel oil to give them a range of 7,000 nautical miles (13,000 km; 8,100 mi) at 16 knots (30 km/h; 18 mph).

=== Armament and protection ===
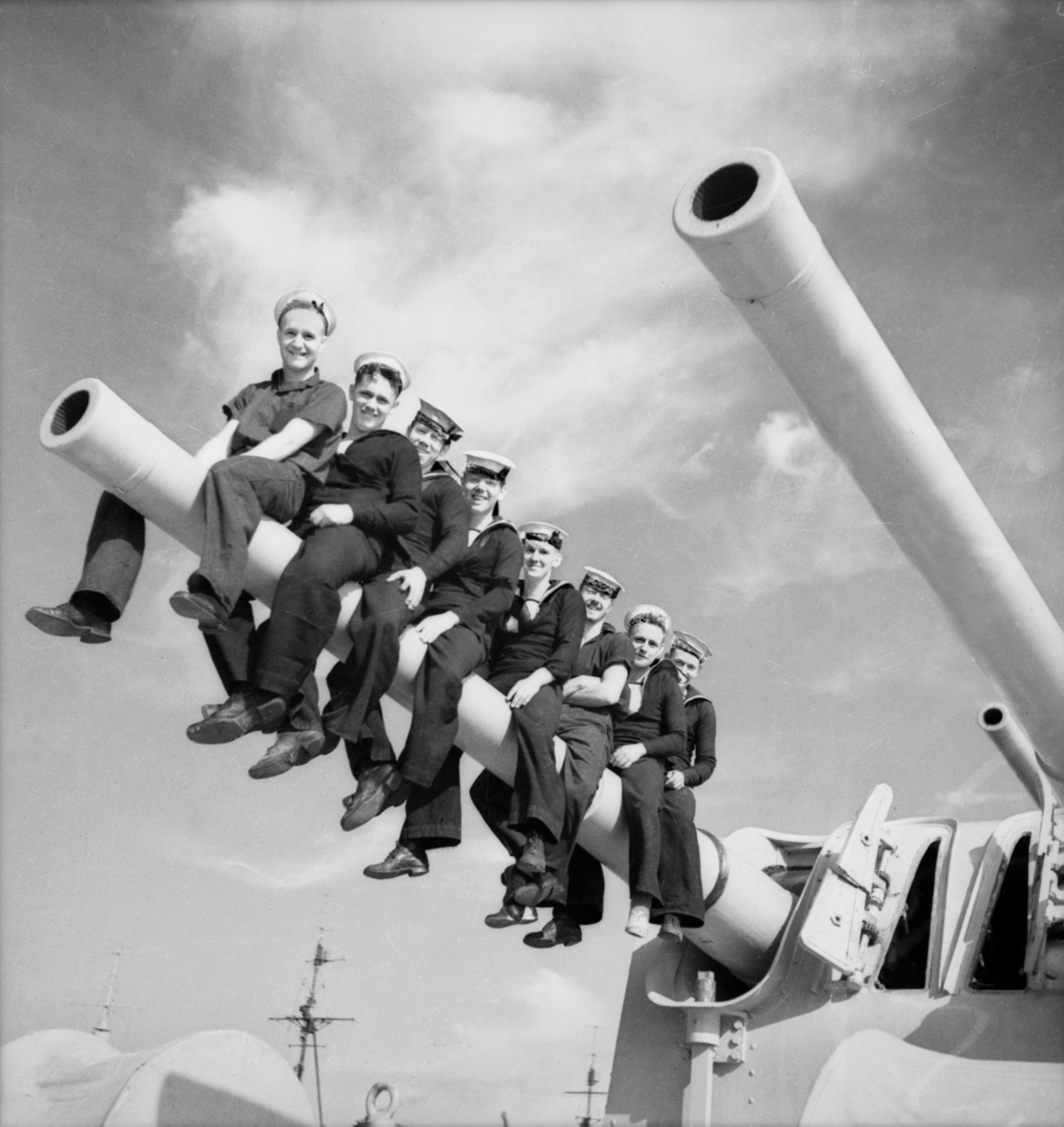
Sailors astride one of Perth's main guns, 1941

The main battery of the Modified Leander class consisted of eight BL 6-inch (152 mm) Mk XXIII guns arranged in two pairs of superfiring twin-gun turrets fore and aft of the superstructure. Their secondary armament consisted of four QF 4-inch (102 mm) Mk V guns in open single mounts abreast the aft funnel. For short-range air defence, the ship was fitted with three quadruple mounts for Vickers 0.5 in (12.7 mm) AA machineguns. They were also armed with eight 21-inch (533 mm) torpedo tubes in two above-water quadruple mounts, one on each broadside.

Most of the armour protecting parts of the ship consisted of non-cemented armour. The machinery spaces were protected by a 3-inch (76 mm) waterline belt and the deck above them consisted of 1.125 inches (29 mm) of high-tensile steel. The sides of the magazines consisted of 3.5-inch (89 mm) armour plates and their roofs were protected by 2-inch (51 mm) plates. The gun turrets had 1 inch (25 mm) thick sides and roofs.

== Construction and career ==
Amphion was originally ordered for the RN as part of the 1931–1932 Naval Programme, but the order was suspended until the design of the Modified Leander class was finished. The ship was laid down at HM Dockyard, Portsmouth on 26 June 1933 and was launched by the Marchioness of Titchfield on 27 July 1934. Amphion was commissioned on 15 June 1936 and was completed on 6 July. The cruiser served as the flagship of the Commander-in-Chief, Africa and the 6th Cruiser Squadron (Vice-Admiral Sir Francis Tottenham) from 1936 to 1938.

In early 1939 the ship was refitted and her Mk V four-inch guns were replaced by four twin-gun mounts for QF four-inch Mk XVI dual-purpose guns. The base for a rotating aircraft catapult and its associated crane were also installed.

=== Australian service ===
Amphion was sold to the RAN and was commissioned into service on 29 June 1939. She was renamed HMAS Perth on 10 July by Princess Marina, Duchess of Kent. On entry into Australian service, the ship's company stood at 646 (35 officers and 611 ratings). Most of the ship's company had departed Australia in May 1939 aboard SS Autolycus: the enlisted men had to live and sleep in the ship's livestock holds. In early August, while en route to Australia, Perth was used to represent her nation at the 1939 New York World's Fair. While at New York City, there was a minor "mutiny" aboard. The cause was orders that sailors ashore for shore leave would have to return to the ship at 18:00 and change from white uniforms to blue uniforms, although the overall treatment of the sailors by the officers had been an issue since the cruiser was taken over by the RAN. Over 60 sailors gathered on the ship's forecastle, where they were confronted by officers with side arms (the first time RAN officers had been armed to deal with a mutiny) and were ordered below decks, but they refused. The warship's commanding officer, Captain Harold Farncomb, next approached the sailors and informed them that if they did not follow orders to disperse, he would treat their actions as a mutiny. The standoff could be seen from the wharfside, and a heavily armed force from the New York City Police Department was dispatched but did not intervene. Farncomb successfully defused the situation by making the offer that any sailor wanting to wear blue uniform all day ashore could do so after asking permission; an offer taken up by almost every sailor taking shore leave.

=== World War II ===
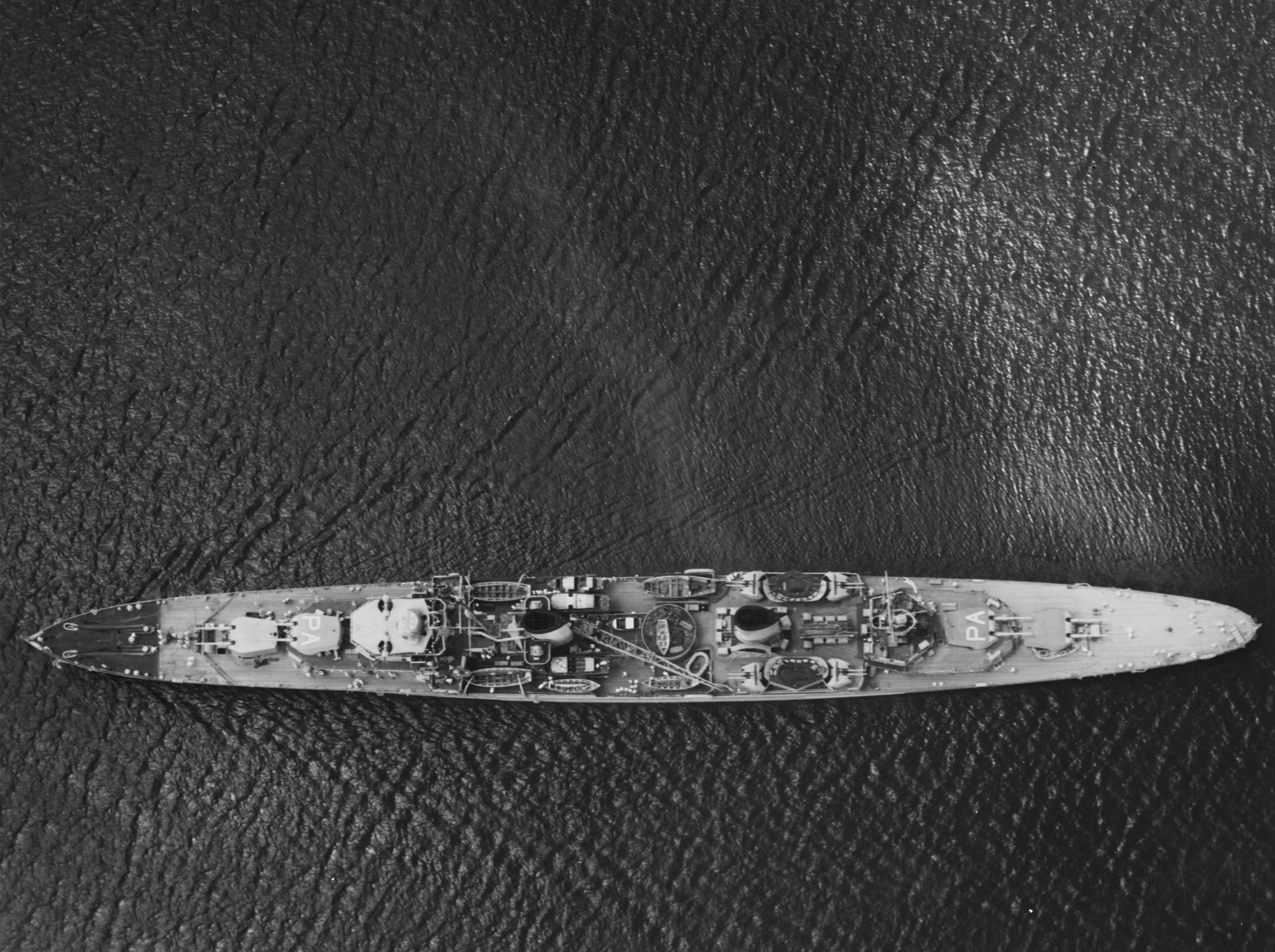
Overhead view of Perth, passing through Gatun Lake in the Panama Canal, 2 March 1940

While still en route to Australia, Perth was steaming off the coast of Venezuela when World War II began. As she was initially the only British Commonwealth warship in the Caribbean and western Atlantic, the cruiser began searching the region for German shipping and escorting convoys. Perth did not leave the area until March 1940, sailing via the Panama Canal to reach Australian waters for the first time on 31 March. On arrival, Perth was refitted at Sydney's Garden Island Naval Base until 29 April, during which her catapult was installed. She initially carried a Supermarine Seagull V, later a Supermarine Walrus. The ship was assigned to convoy escort duty and patrols along the Australian coasts in May. On 6 June Captain Sir Philip Bowyer-Smyth, Bt. assumed command of Perth and Rear-Admiral John Crace hoisted his flag aboard the cruiser as commander of the Australian Squadron. These duties continued through November 1940, when she was sent to the Mediterranean to relieve her sister ship Sydney. Escorting a troop convoy from Australia to the Red Sea en route, Perth reached Alexandria, Egypt, on 24 December, after a short spell of escort duty in the Red Sea. She was assigned to the 7th Cruiser Squadron of the Mediterranean Fleet.

During Operation Excess in early January 1941, the ship escorted a convoy from Malta to Alexandria along with other elements of the Mediterranean Fleet. While docked in Grand Harbour, Malta, on 16 January, Perth was damaged by a near-miss from a bomb that temporarily knocked out her power and caused some flooding. During the bombing, her crew helped to put out the fire aboard the ammunition ship SS Essex and rendered assistance to the damaged aircraft carrier HMS Illustrious. The cruiser departed Malta that evening and reached Alexandria on the 18th where she entered the dockyard for temporary repairs. On 22 January she departed to rendezvous with Illustrious and escort her to Alexandria and then returned to Greece where she patrolled the sea between Crete and Piraeus, Greece. While returning to Alexandria for more permanent repairs, Perth encountered a severe sandstorm while approaching the harbour on the night of 6/7 February, only to find out that the ship was going to be inspected by the Prime Minister of Australia, Robert Menzies, the following morning and thus had to be cleaned before his arrival.

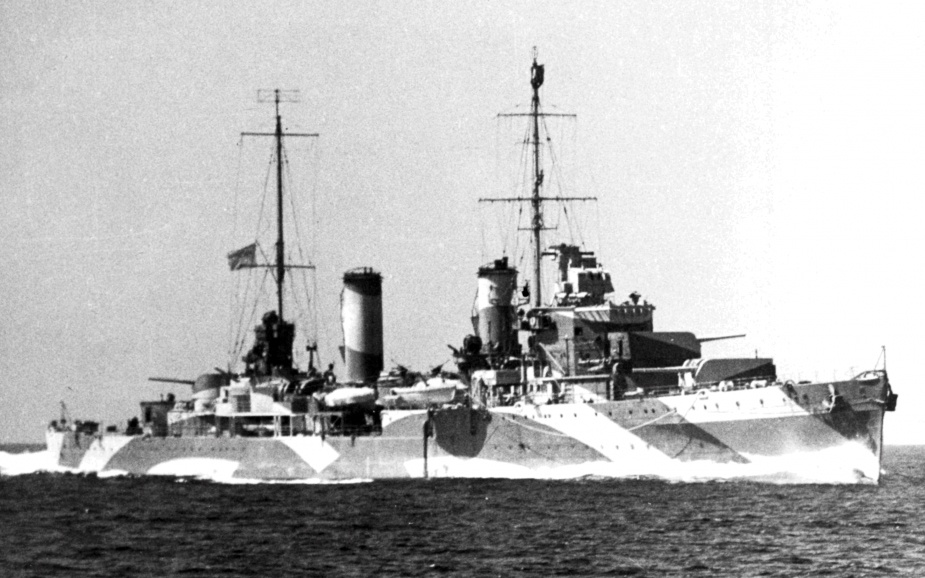
Perth underway after her February 1941 refit

The ship entered the floating drydock on 9 February and remained there for 10 days. During this time, her catapult was removed and replaced by a pair of captured Italian 20-millimetre (0.8 in) Breda AA guns, one on each side of the catapult mount. In addition, a non-rotating Type 286 search radar was installed. On the morning of the 27th, she was one of the escorts for destroyers carrying reinforcements for Operation Abstention, the attack on the island of Kastellorizo, off the Turkish coast in the Italian Dodecanese Islands. Arriving there that night, the British ships found that the Italians had reinforced their garrison; after landing the reinforcements, the army commanders decided to evacuate the island as they were outnumbered by the garrison.

=== Battle of Greece ===
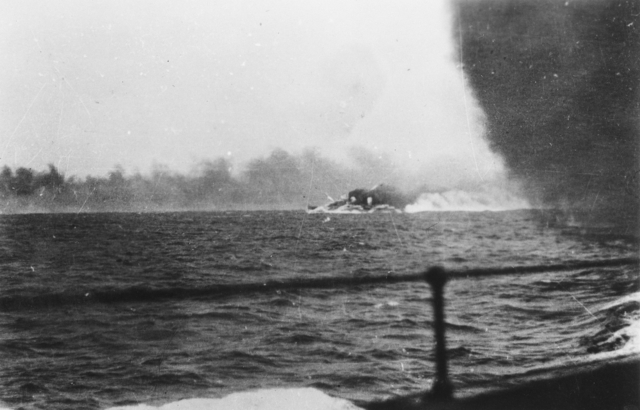
Perth seen from HMS Gloucester amidst the smokescreens during the Battle of Matapan, 28 March 1941

Beginning on 7 March, Perth supported the Allied reinforcement of Greece by transporting soldiers from Alexandria to Piraeus along with patrolling the waters between Greece and Crete. On 17–24 March she escorted another convoy to Malta. Perth played a minor role in the Battle of Cape Matapan on 26–29 March as her squadron was spotted by the Italian fleet and pursued as they retreated towards the main body of the British fleet. Undamaged during the battle, she resumed her previous duties. Sometime in April, the ship was fitted with a quadruple 2-pounder (40 mm (1.6 in)) Mk VIII "pom-pom" AA gun mounted on the catapult base. She escorted a convoy to Malta during 18–20 April and on the return journey, she covered the battleships of the Mediterranean Fleet as they bombarded Tripoli Harbour, in Italian Libya, on the morning of 21 April. On 25 April the ship was assigned to help in the evacuation of Allied troops from Greece. The troops and refugees were loaded at night to minimise the ability of the Axis forces to interfere with them and the ships had strict orders to depart in time to be well away from the coast by dawn, even if troops remained ashore. On the night of 28/29 April, Bowyer-Smyth was in charge of the force sent to evacuate troops from Kalamata. He sent a destroyer forward to reconnoitre the situation in the port while his other ships remained offshore. When the destroyer reported fighting in the harbour, he decided that it was not worth risking his ships being silhouetted again the fires and explosions in the port and ordered a return to Crete. By the time that the destroyer was able to report that the harbour had been secured, Bowyer-Smyth felt it was too late to return.

The cruiser was one of the escorts for the Tiger Convoy between Malta and Alexandria in early May. When the Germans invaded Crete on 20 May, Perth was part of Force C that consisted of two cruisers and four destroyers, patrolling in the vicinity of the Kasos Strait, northeast of Crete. The following day they were repeatedly attacked by German and Italian aircraft that sank one of the destroyers. Now assigned to Force D, Perth and her consorts intercepted a German invasion convoy of small ships on the morning of the 22nd, escorted by the Italian torpedo boat Sagittario. Perth sank a straggler from another convoy before the main convoy was spotted at 08:47. The torpedo boat had been trying to collect stragglers and her commander ordered his convoy to disperse while he laid a smokescreen and then engaged the Allied ships with little effect. His diversion and the lack of visibility caused by his smokescreen, coupled with repeated aerial attacks that peppered the ships with shrapnel, allowed the convoy to escape with only the loss of two ships. Upon her return to Alexandria, Perth spent a few days under repair.

On the evening of 28 May, the ship was assigned to Force D, three cruisers, three destroyers and a troopship, which was sent to evacuate soldiers from Sphakia, a small port on the southern coast of Crete, after their defeat by German paratroopers. Perth carried two small landing craft to ferry troops aboard. The Allied ships were not attacked during the following day as they embarked the soldiers and they departed before dawn on the 30th. Beginning at 09:30 Force D was repeatedly attacked by German aircraft, with Perth suffering several near-misses before being struck by a bomb which exploded in the forward boiler room shortly before 10:00 with 4 of her sailors and 9 of the 1,188 embarked soldiers killed. The explosion temporarily knocked out her power and the cruiser came to a halt before it could be restored a half-hour later. It also bent the starboard inner propeller shaft and badly damaged the galley, the high-angle fire-control computer, the Admiralty Fire Control Table for the six-inch guns and started many leaks in the hull plating.

The cruiser was able to reach Alexandria the next day and was under repair until 22 June. Perth sailed for Haifa, British Palestine, three days later to participate in the invasion of Vichy Syria and Lebanon. On the 27th she helped to lay a minefield off Damour and then provided gunfire support to Allied forces and bombarding Vichy facilities through to the end of the campaign before returning to Alexandria on 15 July. While she was waiting to be relieved by her sister Hobart, the quadruple "pom-pom" and the two Breda guns were removed and her catapult was reinstalled.

=== Return to the Pacific Ocean ===
Perth returned to Australia for permanent repairs, arriving in Sydney on 12 August. The release of her crew for shore leave was delayed by a speech from Menzies that same day that was not well-received. In addition to the required repairs, the Type 286 radar was removed and two quadruple 0.5-inch machinegun mounts were reinstalled on her quarterdeck. She also probably received four 20-millimetre Oerlikon AA guns in single mounts installed on the superfiring turrets' roofs and in the superstructure near the bridge. Bowyer-Smith was relieved of his command and sent back to Britain on 1 September and Captain Hector Waller assumed command on 24 October. Completion of the refit at Cockatoo Island was delayed by a month after a fire melted the electrical cables leading to the director-control tower on the roof of the bridge; on 24 November the ship conducted her full-power sea trials. After the refit's completion, Perth and the heavy cruiser Canberra steamed on 12 December from Sydney to Brisbane. Three days later, they met with the light cruiser HMNZS Achilles, and formed up as the heavy escort for the Pensacola Convoy. Perth continued convoy escort duties in home waters until the end of January 1942.

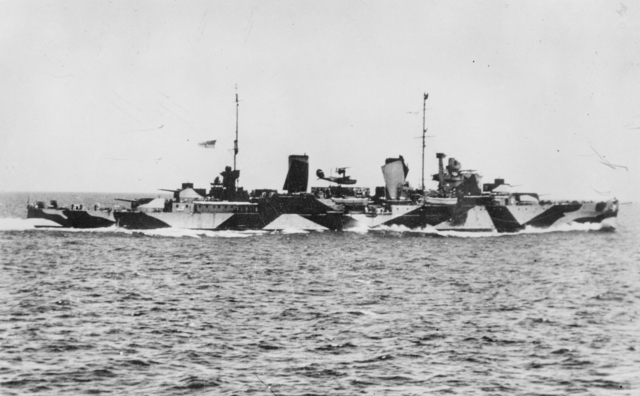
Perth in 1942 with 20 mm guns atop her turrets

Perth was scheduled to remain in eastern home waters within the ANZAC Area while the Canberra underwent refit. The War Cabinet agreed to meet a request by the United States for deployment of Perth to the American-British-Dutch-Australian (ABDA) Area immediately and, in doing so, escort a convoy proceeding to ABDA. On 31 January Perth sailed from Sydney, reaching Fremantle, Australia, on 10 February and relieved the old light cruiser HMAS Adelaide on 15 February as escort for the convoy of four empty oil tankers and two cargo vessels on a mission to claim as much oil from the Dutch East Indies as possible before the Japanese invaded. After Singapore was captured (endangering the destination port of Palembang), all but Perth and the cargo vessel SS 's Jacob were ordered to return to Fremantle. Although joined en route by the Dutch ships SS Swartenhondt and SS Karsik, the operation was cancelled on 21 February, when the ships were 600 nautical miles (1,100 km; 690 mi) from the Sunda Strait, separating Java and Sumatra. Perth escorted the three other vessels back to within 700 nautical miles (1,300 km; 810 mi) of Fremantle before turning north to join ABDA's Western Strike Force. She arrived at Tanjung Priok, Java, on 24 February and was not damaged by a Japanese air raid later in the day.

==== Battle of the Java Sea ====
After a Dutch reconnaissance aircraft spotted the Japanese eastern invasion fleet on the 25th, heading to their landing site west of Surabaya, Java, Perth, together with the British heavy cruiser Exeter and destroyers Jupiter, Electra and Encounter, then proceeded to Surabaya, where they joined ABDA's eastern strike force under Rear-Admiral Karel Doorman. The force now consisted of the heavy cruisers Exeter and USS Houston, three light cruisers (Doorman's flagship HNLMS De Ruyter, HNLMS Java and Perth), five modern destroyers (three British and two Dutch) and four elderly American destroyers. On the evening of the 26th, they sortied in an unsuccessful search for the Japanese ships.

The Japanese received reports that the Allied ships were near their planned route at 11:00 on the 27th. Their cruisers launched floatplanes to confirm these reports and they spotted Doorman's ships heading east at 12:35. Five minutes later Doorman turned south to refuel in Surabaya. The Japanese observed this turn and they decided to continue with the landing at 13:40. Shortly after the Allied ships had passed through the minefield protecting the harbour entrance, Doorman received a report at 14:27 that the Japanese ships were 50 nmi (93 km; 58 mi) northwest of Surabaya. He reversed course almost immediately intending to attack the convoy. The Japanese floatplanes observed his movements, despite attacks by Allied fighters at 14:18 and 14:30, and their report caught the invasion force widely separated as it prepared to conduct the landing that evening.

Electra spotted the Japanese light cruiser Jintsū at 16:12 which turned southwest and opened fire at a range of 16,000 yd (15,000 m) shortly afterwards. The heavy cruiser Nachi, trailing far behind, opened fire at 28,000 yd (26,000 m) at 16:17. The Allied heavy cruisers returned Nachi's fire three minutes later. At 16:21 Doorman turned slightly southwards to prevent the Japanese from crossing his 'T' and Rear-Admiral Takeo Takagi, commander of the invasion escort force, turned slightly away to open up the range as the shooting on both sides had been accurate, although no hits were made. Doorman turned west southwest at 16:27 to better prevent his 'T' from being crossed, a manoeuvre that kept the range too far for the Allied light cruisers to contribute their gunfire. Both Japanese destroyer squadrons were manoeuvring during this time to make torpedo attacks using their powerful Type 93 "Long Lance" torpedoes.

Both squadron flagships opened fire beginning at 16:30 with the destroyers of Rear Admiral Shoji Nishimura's 4th Destroyer Squadron following between 16:40 and 16:45 at ranges from 13,000 to 15,000 yd (12,000 to 14,000 m) with a total of 31 torpedoes aimed at the Allied ships, all of which missed. Nachi's sister Haguro contributed eight torpedoes at 16:52 at long range, which also missed. The gunfire duel continued while the torpedoes were being launched and Perth reported "tight salvos landing around [the ship], first 25 yd (23 m) short, then 25 yards over". About ten minutes later, Takagi realised that the Allied ships were closing in on the invasion convoy's route and he ordered an all-out attack to prevent them from reaching the convoy. About the same time, Doorman turned slightly northwards, closing the range. At 17:08, one of Haguro's 203-millimetre shells struck Exeter at a distance of 22,000 yards, detonating inside one of her boiler rooms. The shell set the ship on fire and knocked six of her eight boilers offline, and cut her speed to 5 knots. The British cruiser fell out of formation and rapidly began to lose speed. The following cruisers assumed that this turn was deliberate and followed Exeter; once Waller realised that she had been crippled, he ordered Perth to circle her, laying a smokescreen to conceal her. Haguro then launched her torpedo battery again at 22,000 yards, with a single torpedo hitting the destroyer Kortenaer, which blew in half and sank.

Doorman needed some time to reorganise his forces and ordered Exeter to head back to Surabaya, escorted by the British destroyers and the surviving Dutch destroyer. The remaining ships laid copious amounts of smoke and circled around as the Japanese attempted to sink the crippled ship with torpedoes. The light cruisers were the first to fire at 17:50 and were followed by the heavy cruisers and the destroyers; a total of 98 torpedoes that all missed. Two of the British destroyers charged through the smoke in an attempt to disrupt the attacks, Electra being sunk in the manoeuvre, and the Allied cruisers took up a course parallel to Exeter's. At 18:10 the American destroyers also charged out of the smoke and fired 24 of their torpedoes at Nachi and Haguro, all of which missed. By this time, Takagi could see the lighthouse at Surabaya and he decided to break contact in the gathering darkness lest any of his ships enter a minefield defending the port. At 18:12 Perth claimed a hit on Haguro, but postwar research showed that the cruiser was not damaged during the battle.

Doorman was determined to continue the battle and reversed course at 18:31 and his ships were spotted on their new course at 18:46. The Japanese ships were widely dispersed after their attacks and it took Takagi some time to organise them. In the meantime, Nishimura ordered the invasion convoy to turn westward at 19:04. After a brief engagement with Jintsū, Doorman decided to disengage and then circle around to the south and try to get behind the Japanese escorts at 21:00. The American destroyers, low on fuel and out of torpedoes, independently decided to return to Surabaya at that same time. As Doorman was turning his ships north at 21:25, Jupiter struck a Dutch mine and lost all power before sinking. During this time, Takagi was aware of Doorman's movements as one of Jintsū's floatplanes was dropping flares to track the Allied ships. At 21:20 Naka's floatplane relieved it, but it lost contact with Takagi at 22:00 which left both sides searching blindly.

At 23:02 Nachi's lookouts spotted the Allied cruisers and the sisters manoeuvred to deliver a torpedo attack. Doorman's ships spotted the Japanese cruisers about the same time and they opened fire at 23:10. Nachi fired her torpedo battery, and it was one of these torpedoes that struck Java, which broke in half and sank. Meanwhile, Haguro followed up with her torpedo battery, one of which hit De Ruyter, which sank to progressive flooding over three hours. Perth and Houston were the only large Allied ships to survive the battle, and they withdrew to Tanjung Priok afterwards on the morning of 28 February. The two ships attempted to resupply, but fuel shortages meant that Perth could only load half her normal fuel capacity, and a lack of ammunition left her with only the 160 six-inch shells remaining after the previous day. The cruisers and the Dutch destroyer Evertsen were ordered to sail for Tjilatjap via the Sunda Strait that night.

==== Battle of Sunda Strait ====
Perth and Houston sailed at 19:00 (Evertsen was delayed), low on fuel and ammunition, with Perth leading as Waller was in overall command as the senior officer present. The Allies believed that Sunda Strait was free of enemy vessels, but the Japanese western invasion force had assembled at Bantam Bay on the northwestern tip of Java without their knowledge. The cruisers were heading west when they were spotted at 22:39 by the destroyer Fubuki on patrol east of the bay at a range of 11,000 yd (10,000 m). After reporting to Rear Admiral Kenzaburo Hara, commander of the escort force, the destroyer trailed the Allied ships. Hara's flagship, the light cruiser Natori, saw them at 22:48 at a range of 18,500 yd (16,900 m); Hara concluded that the silhouettes were enemy cruisers at 22:59 and intended to use Natori as bait to lure Perth and Houston away from the transports.

At 23:06 lookouts on Perth sighted an unidentified ship and challenged it, expecting to see one of the Australian corvettes supposedly on station. When an unintelligible reply was received in return and the ship turned away and made smoke, Waller recognised the silhouette of a Japanese destroyer (Harukaze), turned north to follow and opened fire at 23:15. Fubuki was 3,000 yd (2,700 m) behind Houston when the Allied ships turned north and she fired nine older 61-centimetre Type 90 torpedoes as she turned in pursuit as well as 16 rounds from her 12.7-centimetre (5 in) guns; all of which missed. Realizing that Waller was reacting to the nearby destroyer movements, Hara cancelled his plan when Waller opened fire and summoned all of his ships to attack. Harukaze's sister Hatakaze was the first to close firing her 12-centimetre (4.7 in) guns at Perth before she turned northeast at 23:38. The cruiser was struck twice by light shells, once at 23:26 and again six minutes later, but was only slightly damaged.

Shortly before 23:40, the destroyers Hatsuyuki and Shirayuki closed to 4,000 yd (3,700 m) before emptying all nine of their torpedo tubes and turning away under the cover of smoke. Perth hit the latter's bridge with a six-inch shell, killing 1 man and wounding 11 more. None of these torpedoes hit their targets and Waller's ships continued to loop around to the south and west. Harukaze, Hatakaze and their sister Asakaze closed to attack, although the former ship was struck at least three times by Allied shells that killed three men and wounded 15. She was forced to fall out of formation and Hatakaze could not fire because of the frequent near-misses surrounding the cruisers. Asakaze was able to fire her six torpedoes, but they missed as well. At 23:44 Natori engaged Perth with 29 shells from her 14-centimetre (5.5 in) guns and fired four torpedoes with no known effect before turning away two minutes later. By this time, the destroyers were no longer in the line of fire of the heavy cruisers Mikuma and her sister Mogami which targeted Perth with six torpedoes each at a range of 12,000 yd (11,000 m) at 23:49, none of which hit their target. About this time Perth and Houston began shooting at the Japanese heavy cruisers, but consistently shot ahead of them, possibly because both ships were streaming paravanes which increased the size their bow waves and made the Allied ships overestimate their speed. Perth received an inconsequential hit around 23:50.

After reversing course and slightly closing the range, Mogami and Mikuma opened fire at Houston with their main guns at a range of 12,200 yd (11,200 m) at 23:52 using their searchlights. Three minutes later the Allied ship hit Mikuma, killing six and wounding eleven men. With Perth down to firing practice rounds, Harukaze and Hatakaze closed in to 4,200 yd (3,800 m) before firing eleven torpedoes between them during 23:56–23:58. Two minutes later the destroyers Shirakumo and Murakumo fired nine apiece at 5,000 yd (4,600 m) and Natori contributed four more at 9,000 yd (8,200 m). About this time, a near-miss damaged the propeller of the Japanese destroyer Shikinami, which was escorting the heavy cruisers.

At 00:05 five of Mogami's torpedoes that had missed Perth struck and sank four transports and blew a minesweeper in half. About this time, Waller ordered his ship to try to force a way through to the Sunda Strait. Just as Perth settled on her new heading, she was hit by a torpedo in the forward engine room, probably from Harukaze. A second torpedo hit two minutes later that punched a hole in the hull near the bridge and two others followed shortly after, probably from Shirakumo and Mirakumo. Waller gave the order to abandon ship after the second torpedo impact. After some further close-range fire from the destroyers, Perth capsized to port and sank at 00:25 on 1 March 1942, with 353 killed: 342 RAN (including Waller), 5 Royal Navy, 3 Royal Australian Air Force, and 3 civilian canteen workers. Houston was torpedoed and sank about 20 minutes later. Of the 328 survivors, 5 died after reaching shore, while the rest became prisoners of war; 106 died during their internment: 105 naval and 1 RAAF, including 38 killed by Allied attacks on Japanese "hell ships". The surviving 218 were repatriated after the war.

=== Unauthorised salvage ===
The wreck was discovered by David Burchell in 1967; at the time, the ship was reasonably intact, lying on its side at a depth of about 35 m (115 ft). In late 2013, divers found that the wreck of Perth was being stripped by unauthorised Indonesian marine salvagers. Reports in September indicated that crane-equipped barges had stripped off most of the wreck's superstructure, forward turrets, and forward decking, and that explosives had been used to break the ship up for easier recovery. These actions compromised the structural integrity of the wreck site, and have potentially exposed live munitions and oil tanks. Perth's wreck is not protected as a war grave, either through the UNESCO Convention on the Protection of the Underwater Cultural Heritage (Australia and Indonesia are not signatories to the treaty) or through legislation in either nation. The stripping of Perth's wreck was not publicly reported until December 2013; the Australian Broadcasting Corporation speculated that the government departments made aware of the issue tried to keep it under wraps to avoid further deterioration of relations between Australia and Indonesia, particularly following the Australia–Indonesia spying scandal.

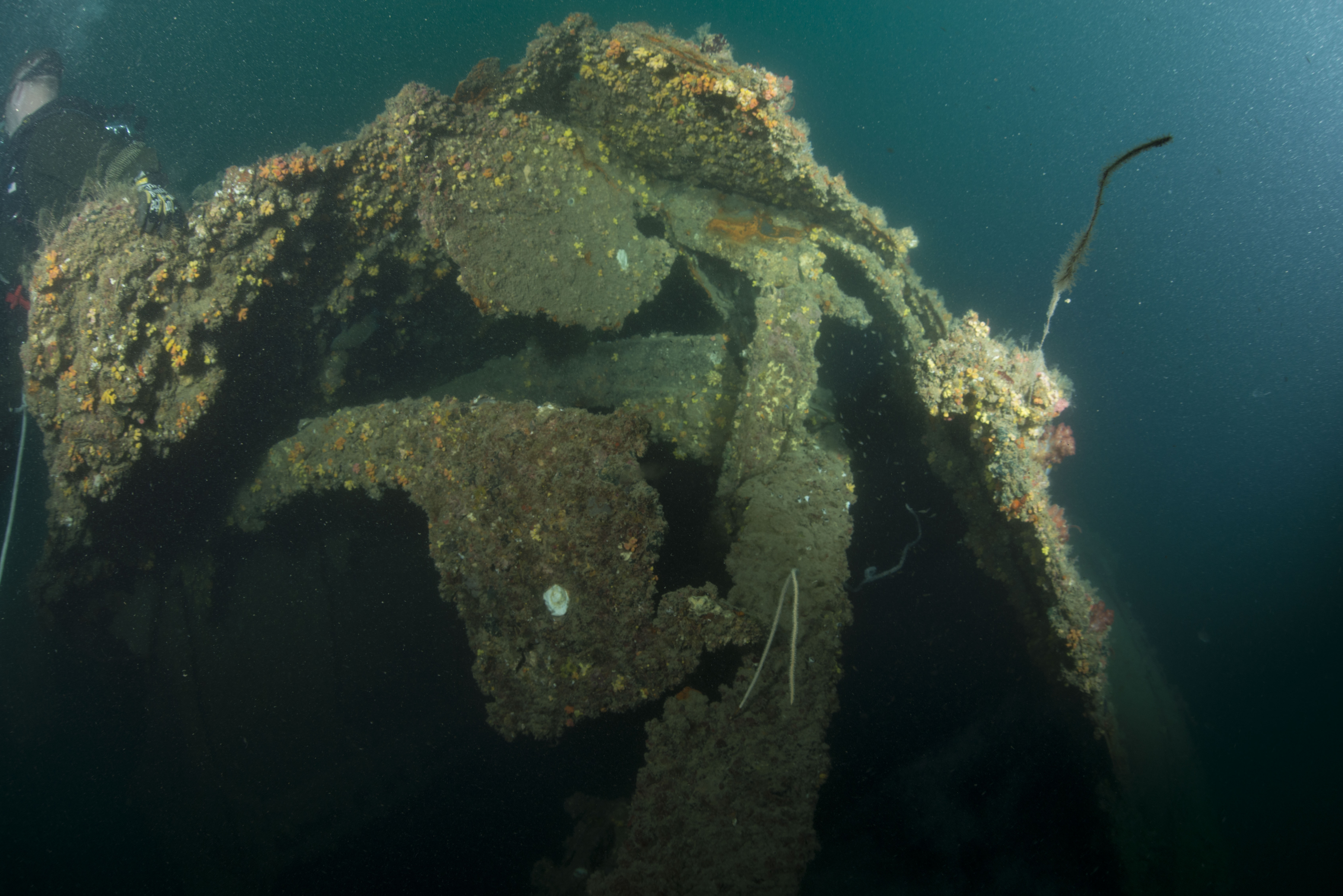
A photograph taken of the wreck of Perth during the 2015 United States-Indonesia survey

In October 2015, United States Navy and Indonesian Navy divers embarked aboard USNS Safeguard undertook a nine-day survey of Perth and Houston. Divers documented the condition of the two shipwrecks, and identified signs of unauthorised salvage. The operation was a prelude to a conference in Jakarta on preserving and preventing the unauthorised salvage of wartime shipwrecks in the Java Sea.

The wreck was surveyed by a team from the Australian National Maritime Museum, the Indonesian Ministry of Marine Affairs and Fisheries and the Indonesian National Research Centre for Archaeology (ARKENAS) in May 2017. As of that date, the ship's six-inch gun turrets, starboard-side armour belt and its associated hull plating and the propellers had all been removed, as had almost all of the propulsion machinery, most likely because it is low-background steel. "ARKENAS has proposed that the site be declared a Situs Cagar Budaya (Cultural Heritage Site) under Indonesian cultural heritage legislation, while the Ministry of Marine Affairs and Fisheries also intends to list the site as a Marine Conservation Zone."

== Legacy ==
The cruiser's wartime service was later recognised with the battle honours "Atlantic 1939", "Malta Convoys 1941", "Matapan 1941", "Greece 1941", "Crete 1941", "Mediterranean 1941", "Pacific 1941–42", and "Sunda Strait 1942". The RAN named a submarine, HMAS Waller, after Captain Waller.

The HMAS Perth Memorial Regatta is held annually by the Nedlands Yacht Club, Perth, in honour of Waller, the crew, and the ship. The original ships' bells of the cruiser Perth and the Cold War-era destroyer of the same name are displayed at the Perth Town Hall. There is a memorial plaque in St John's Anglican Church, King's Square, Fremantle, and a memorial service is held annually in the church in late February.

HMAS Perth is the only foreign warship commemorated in the grounds of Arlington National Cemetery in Arlington, VA.

== General references ==
- Admiralty Historical Section (2002). The Royal Navy and the Mediterranean: November 1940 – December 1941. Whitehall Histories, Naval Staff Histories. Vol. 2. London: Whitehall History in association with Frank Cass. ISBN 0-7146-5205-9.
- Bastock, John (1975). Australia's Ships of War. Cremorne, New South Wales: Angus and Robertson. ISBN 0-207-12927-4. OCLC 2525523.
- Carlton, Mike (2012). Cruiser: The Life and Loss of HMAS Perth and Her Crew. North Sydney, NSW: Random House Australia. ISBN 978-1-86471-133-2.
- Cassells, Vic (2000). The Capital Ships: Their Battles and Their Badges. East Roseville, New South Wales: Simon & Schuster. ISBN 0-7318-0941-6. OCLC 48761594.
- Frame, Tom (1993). HMAS Sydney: Loss and Controversy. Rydalmere, New South Wales: Hodder & Stoughton. ISBN 0-340-58468-8. OCLC 32234178.
- Frame, Tom (2004). No Pleasure Cruise: The Story of the Royal Australian Navy. Crows Nest, New South Wales: Allen & Unwin. ISBN 1-74114-233-4. OCLC 55980812.
- Frame, Tom & Baker, Kevin (2000). Mutiny! Naval Insurrections in Australia and New Zealand. St. Leonards, New South Wales: Allen & Unwin. ISBN 1-86508-351-8. OCLC 46882022.
- Friedman, Norman (2010). British Cruisers: Two World Wars and After. Barnsley, UK: Seaforth. ISBN 978-1-59114-078-8.
- Gill, G. Hermon (1957). "Defeat in ABDA". Royal Australian Navy 1939–1942. Australia in the War of 1939–1945. Series 2 – Navy. Vol. 1. Canberra: Australian War Memorial. OCLC 848228.
- Goldrick, James (2005). "World War II: The War against Germany and Italy"; "World War II: The War against Japan". In Stevens, David & Reeve, John (eds.). The Navy and the Nation: The Influence of the Navy on Modern Australia. Crows Nest, New South Wales: Allen & Unwin. ISBN 1-74114-200-8. OCLC 67872922.
- Lacroix, Eric & Wells II, Linton (1997). Japanese Cruisers of the Pacific War. Annapolis, Maryland: Naval Institute Press. ISBN 0-87021-311-3.
- Lenton, H. T. (1998). British & Empire Warships of the Second World War. Annapolis, Maryland: Naval Institute Press. ISBN 1-55750-048-7.
- McKie, Ronald (1953). Proud Echo. Sydney: Angus & Robertson.
- Morris, Douglas (1987). Cruisers of the Royal and Commonwealth Navies Since 1879. Liskeard, UK: Maritime Books. ISBN 0-907771-35-1.
- O'Hara, Vincent (2009). Struggle for the Middle Sea: The Great Navies at War in the Mediterranean Theater, 1940–1945. Annapolis, Maryland: Naval Institute Press. ISBN 978-1-59114-648-3.
- O'Hara, Vincent P. (2007). The U.S. Navy Against the Axis: Surface Combat 1941–1945. Annapolis, Maryland: Naval Institute Press. ISBN 978-1-59114-650-6.
- Perry, Roland (2020). Red Lead: The legendary Australian ship's cat who survived the sinking of HMAS Perth and the Thai-Burma Railway. Crows Nest, NSW: Allen & Unwin. ISBN 9781760297145.
- Raven, Alan & Roberts, John (1980). British Cruisers of World War Two. Annapolis, Maryland: Naval Institute Press. ISBN 0-87021-922-7.
- Raven, Alan (2019). British Cruiser Warfare: The Lessons of the Early War, 1939–1941. Barnsley, UK: Seaforth Publishing. ISBN 978-1-5267-4763-1.
- Rohwer, Jürgen (2005). Chronology of the War at Sea 1939–1945: The Naval History of World War Two (Third Revised ed.). Annapolis, Maryland: Naval Institute Press. ISBN 1-59114-119-2.
- Whiting, Brendan (1995). Ship of Courage: The Epic Story of HMAS Perth and Her Crew. St Leonards, New South Wales: Allen & Unwin. ISBN 1-86373-653-0.
- Whitley, M. J. (1999) [1995]. Cruisers of World War Two: An International Encyclopedia. London: Brockhampton Press. ISBN 1-86019-874-0.
