= Japanese destroyer Asakaze (1922) =

Destroyer of the Imperial Japanese Navy

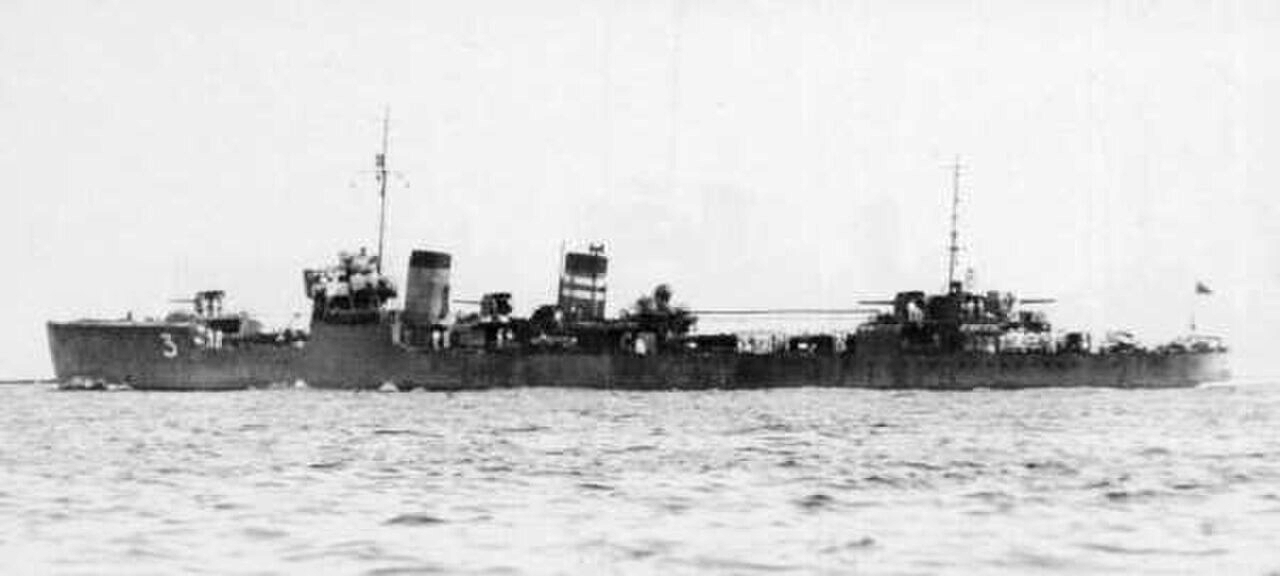
- Asakaze

History

Empire of Japan
- Name: Asakaze
- Builder: Mitsubishi, Nagasaki
- Laid down: 16 February 1922 as Destroyer No. 3
- Launched: 8 December 1922
- Completed: 16 June 1923
- Renamed: Asakaze, 1 August 1928
- Stricken: 10 October 1944
- Fate: Sunk on 23 August 1944

General characteristics
- Class & type: Kamikaze-class destroyer
- Displacement: 1,422 t (1,400 long tons) (normal); 1,747 t (1,719 long tons) (deep load)
- Length: 97.5 m (319 ft 11 in) (pp); 102.5 m (336 ft 3 in) (o/a)
- Beam: 9.1 m (29 ft 10 in)
- Draft: 2.9 m (9 ft 6 in)
- Installed power: 38,500 shp (28,700 kW); 4 × Kampon water-tube boilers
- Propulsion: 2 shafts; 2 × Kampon geared steam turbines
- Speed: 37.3 knots (69.1 km/h; 42.9 mph)
- Range: 3,600 nmi (6,700 km; 4,100 mi) at 14 knots (26 km/h; 16 mph)
- Complement: 148
- Armament: 4 × single 12 cm (4.7 in) Type 3 guns; 3 × twin 53.3 cm (21.0 in) torpedo tubes

Service record
- Operations: Battle of the Philippines; Battle of Sunda Strait

The Japanese destroyer Asakaze (朝風, "Morning Wind") was one of nine Kamikaze-class destroyers built for the Imperial Japanese Navy (IJN) during the 1920s. During the Pacific War, she participated in the Philippines Campaign in December 1941 and the Dutch East Indies Campaign in early 1942. She took part in the Battle of Sunda Strait in March and helped to sink two Allied cruisers. She was sunk by USS Haddo in August 1944.

== Design and description ==
The Kamikaze class was an improved version of the Minekaze-class destroyers. The ships had an overall length of 102.5 meters (336 ft 3 in) and were 97.5 meters (319 ft 11 in) between perpendiculars. They had a beam of 9.1 meters (29 ft 10 in), and a mean draft of 2.9 meters (9 ft 6 in). The Kamikaze-class ships displaced 1,422 metric tons (1,400 long tons) at standard load and 1,747 metric tons (1,719 long tons) at deep load. They were powered by two Parsons geared steam turbines, each driving one propeller shaft, using steam provided by four Kampon water-tube boilers. The turbines were designed to produce 38,500 shaft horsepower (28,700 kW), which would propel the ships at 37.3 knots (69.1 km/h). During sea trials, the ships comfortably exceeded their designed speeds, reaching 38.7 to 39.2 knots (71.7 to 72.6 km/h). The ships carried 420 metric tons (413 long tons) of fuel oil which gave them a range of 3,600 nautical miles (6,700 km) at 14 knots (26 km/h). Their crew consisted of 148 officers and crewmen.

The main armament of the Kamikaze-class ships consisted of four 12-centimeter (4.7 in) Type 3 guns in single mounts; one gun forward of the superstructure, one between the two funnels and the last pair back to back atop the aft superstructure. The guns were numbered '1' to '4' from front to rear. The ships carried three above-water twin sets of 53.3-centimeter (21.0 in) torpedo tubes; one mount was between the forward superstructure and the forward gun and the other two were between the aft funnel and aft superstructure.

Early in the war, the No. 4 gun and the aft torpedo tubes were removed in exchange for four depth charge throwers and 18 depth charges. In addition 10 license-built 25 mm (0.98 in) Type 96 light AA guns were installed. These changes increased their displacement to 1,499 long tons (1,523 t). Survivors had their light AA armament augmented to be between thirteen and twenty 25 mm guns and four 13.2 mm (0.5 in) Type 93 anti-aircraft machineguns by June 1944. These changes reduced their speed to 35 knots (65 km/h).

== Construction and career ==
Asakaze, built by Mitsubishi at their shipyard in Nagasaki, was laid down on 16 February 1922, launched on 8 December 1922 and completed on 16 June 1923. Originally commissioned simply as Destroyer No. 3, the ship was assigned the name Asakaze on 1 August 1928.

=== Pacific War ===
At the time of the attack on Pearl Harbor on 7 December 1941, Asakaze was part of Destroyer Squadron 5 under Destroyer Division 5 in the IJN 3rd Fleet, and deployed from Mako Guard District in the Pescadores as part of the Japanese invasion force for the Operation M (the invasion of the Philippines), during which time she helped screen landings of Japanese forces at Lingayen Gulf.

In early 1942, Asakaze was assigned to escorting troop convoys to Singora, Malaya and French Indochina. Assigned to Operation J (the invasion of Java in the Netherlands East Indies), she participated at the Battle of Sunda Strait on 1 March. During that battle, she launched torpedoes at the light cruiser HMAS Perth and heavy cruiser USS Houston.

On 10 March, Asakaze and Destroyer Division 5 were reassigned to the Southwest Area Fleet and escorted troop convoys from Singapore to Penang, and Rangoon, and covered landings of Japanese troops in the Nicobar Islands as part of Operation D on 11 June. From late July 1942–February 1943, Asakaze was assigned to patrols between Ambon and Timor in the Netherlands East Indies. At the end of February, she was based out of Saigon, and assigned to convoy escort duties between Takao and Moji, Kyūshū. She refitted at Sasebo Naval Arsenal at the end of May, and resumed her convoy escort duties to Saipan and Manila through August 1944.

On 24 August, Asakaze sortied from Takao as escort for a convoy bound for Manila when she was torpedoed by the submarine USS Haddo. She was taken in tow by one of the ships in the convoy – the tanker Nijō Maru – but sank 32 km (17 nmi) southwest of Cape Bolinao, Luzon, Philippines. 16°6′N 119°44′E. Asakaze was struck from the Navy List on 10 October.
