= USS Fletcher =

Two destroyers in the United States Navy have been named USS Fletcher:

- USS Fletcher (DD-445), named for Admiral Frank Friday Fletcher, was the lead Fletcher-class destroyer and served during World War II.
- USS Fletcher (DD-992), named for Admiral Frank Jack Fletcher, was a Spruance-class ASW destroyer.
