= Houston Volunteers =

The Houston Volunteers were a group of 1,000 men who volunteered for U.S. Navy service to avenge the loss of heavy cruiser USS Houston (CA-30) after the ship was sunk by the Imperial Japanese Navy on 1 March 1942 in the Battle of Sunda Strait.

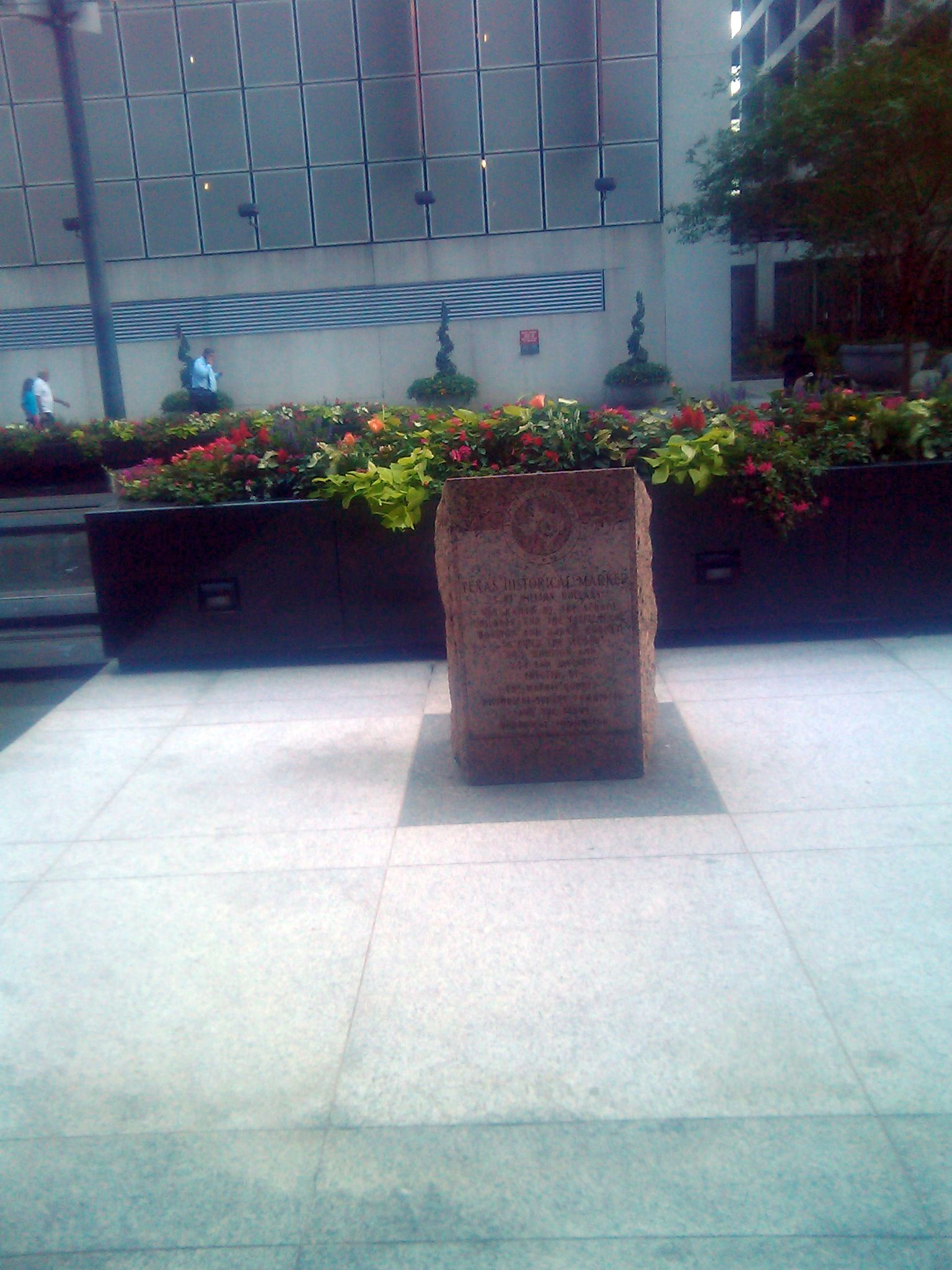
The Memorial.

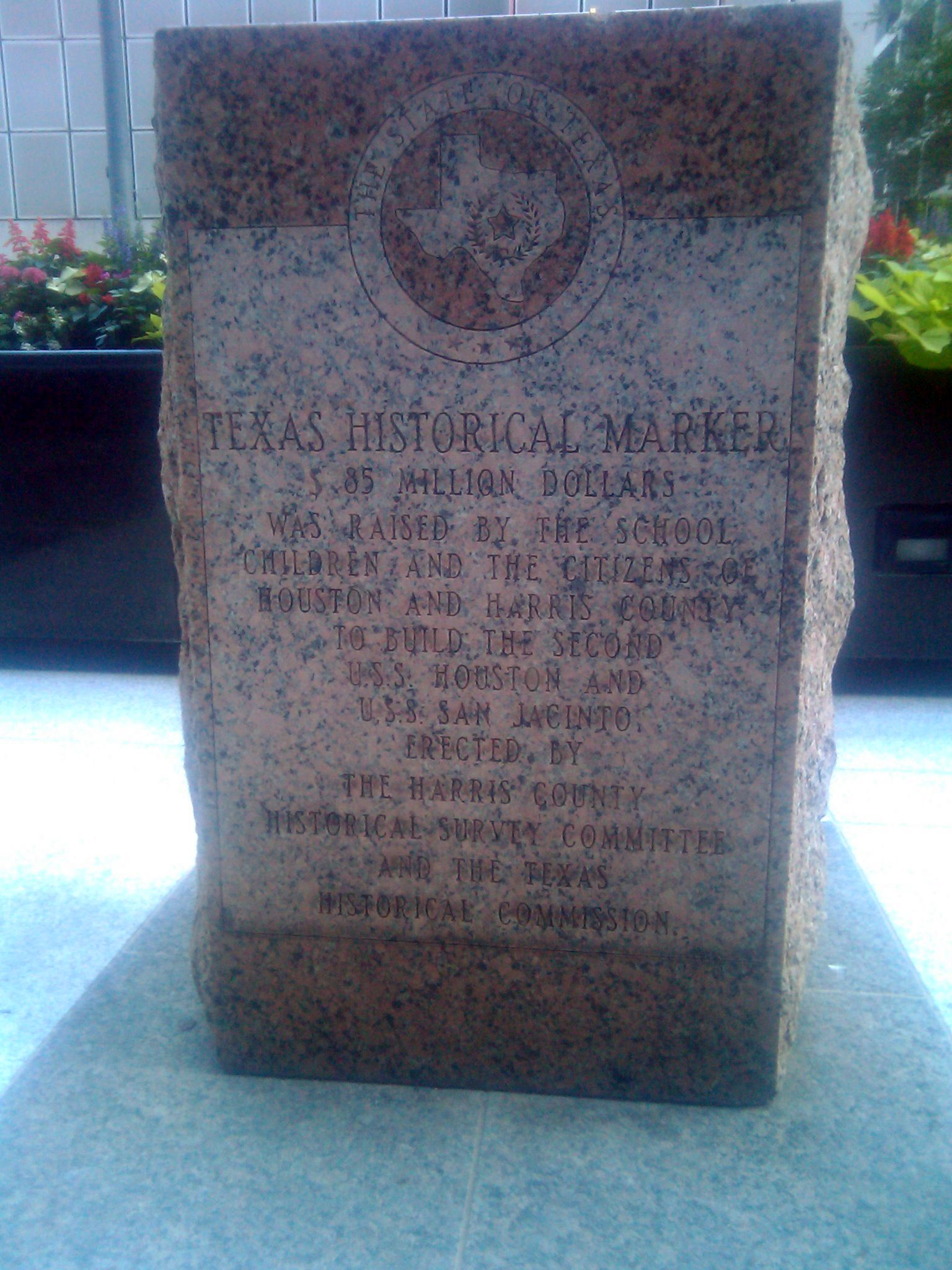
Front View of the Memorial.

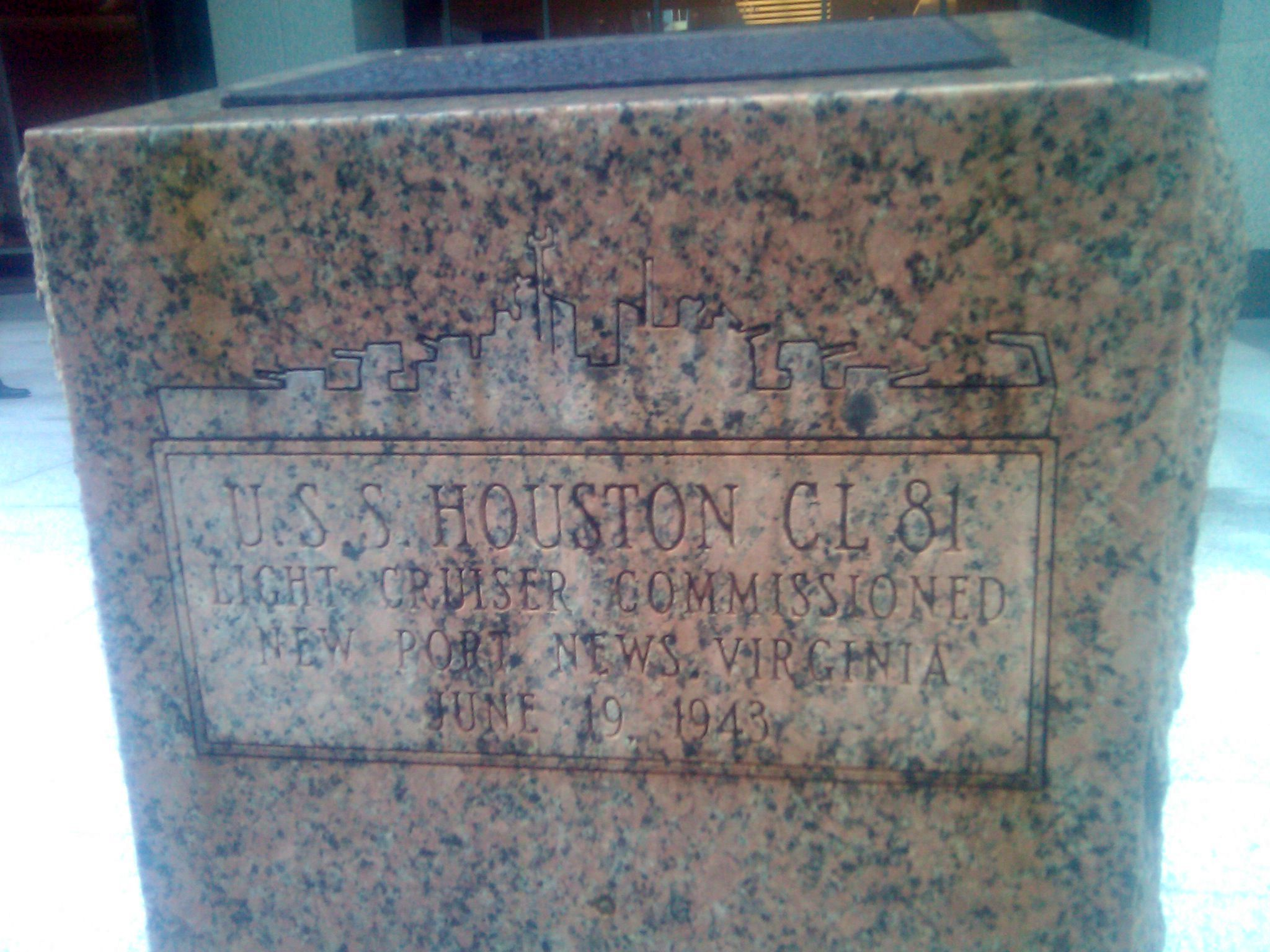
Back View of the Memorial.

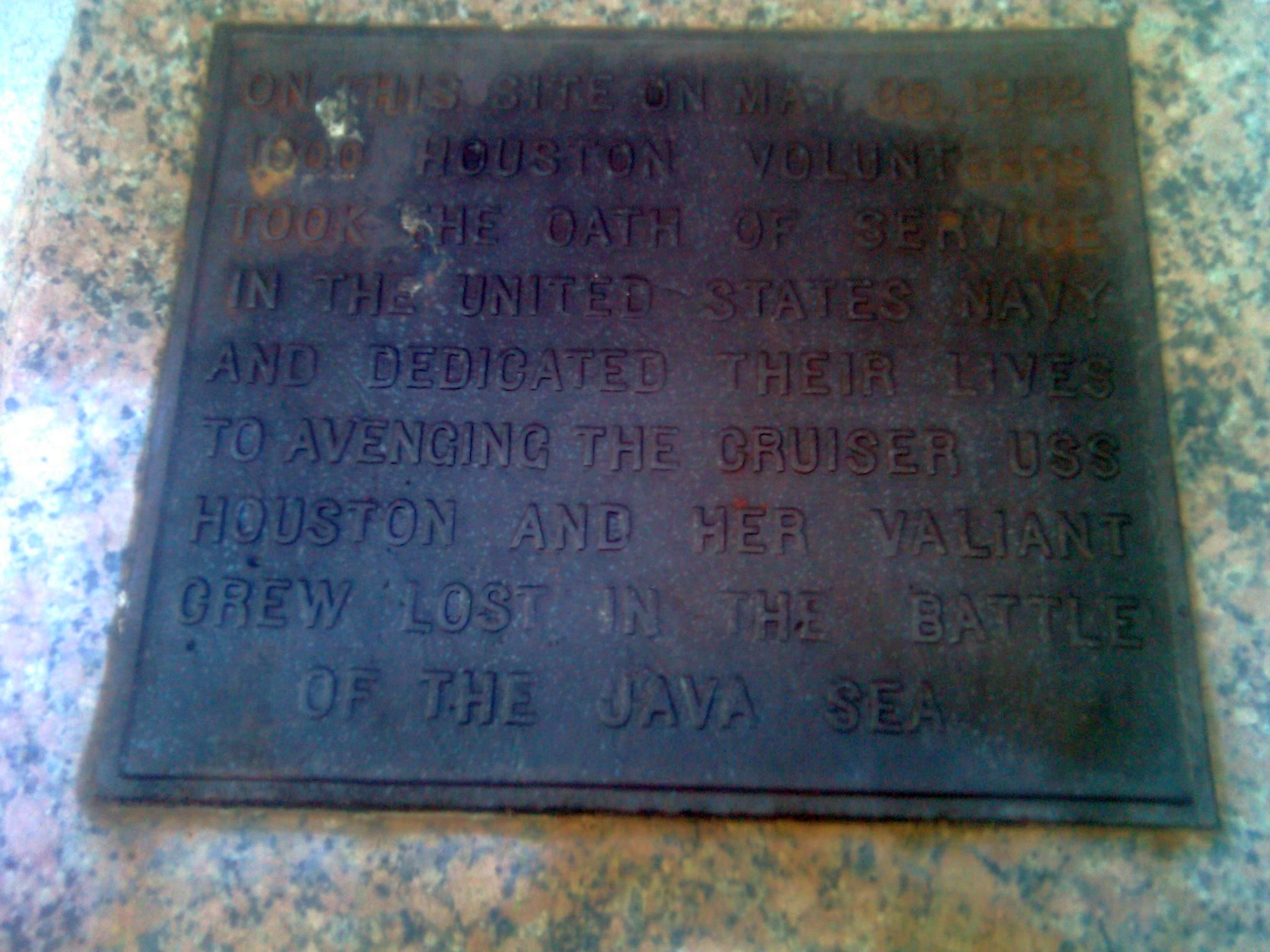
Top View of the Memorial.

The Memorial erected on the occasion of Induction of Houston Volunteers.

A drive in May 1942 for volunteers to replace the men lost on Houston culminated in the acceptance of 1,650 men for service in the Navy. A limit of 1,000 was set for the "Houston Volunteers" group. At the same time, war bond subscriptions totaling $85m were raised to completely pay for another ship named for the city, the light cruiser Houston (CL-81), with enough left over to pay for the light aircraft carrier San Jacinto (CVL-30).

At 6 pm on Memorial Day, 30 May 1942, a mass rally and induction ceremony took place in downtown Houston, the namesake city for the lost ship. The 1,000-man "Houston Volunteers" paraded with several hundred Navy officers and men through downtown Houston, and were accompanied by four bands. Forty-eight bombers based at nearby Ellington Field overflew the festivities.

After the parade, the volunteers lined up on Main Street in rows 16 abreast and were administered the Navy Oath by Rear Admiral William A. Glassford, who then gave a speech describing Houston's final battle. A message from President Franklin Roosevelt, who had taken several pre-war cruises on the ship, was read by Mayor of Houston Neal Pickett.

Not one of us doubts that the thousand naval recruits sworn in today will carry on with the same spirit shown by the gallant men who have gone before them. Not one of us doubts that every true Texan and every true American will back up these new fighting men, with all our hearts and all our efforts.

A crowd estimated at 150,000 to 200,000 witnessed the ceremony. After a 60-foot model of Houston was dedicated, the crowd saw off the departing inductees, who immediately marched to Union Station to travel to training in San Diego on five special trains.

One young man, Robert E. Bradley, was 16 and too young to enlist, but was nonetheless still allowed to participate because his older brother Leonard was lost when Houston (CA-30) went down. He was sworn in on the train three days later when he turned 17 by Lt. Cmdr. Simon L. Shade, the same officer who had sworn in his older brother two years before.

With a 19-month period between the May 1942 enlistment into service of the 1,000 Houston Volunteer sailors and the final December 1943 commissioning into service of the new Houston (CL-81), only one Houston Volunteer went on to specifically serve aboard the new Houston.

On 3 August 1942 the keel for Liberty ship USS Houston Volunteers (MC Hull #110), named in honor of the group of volunteers, was laid at the Todd Houston Shipyard. Houston Volunteers was delivered on 28 October 1942 and served in the Mediterranean during World War II.

On 11 November 1995, a memorial to Houston (CA-30) was dedicated near the spot where the "Houston Volunteers" were inducted. The monument design features the ship’s bell, which was recovered by divers after the end of the war.

== See also ==
- History of Houston
