= Battle of Sunda Strait =

1942 naval battle in the Pacific theatre of WWII, in present-day western Indonesia

- Part of World War II, Pacific War
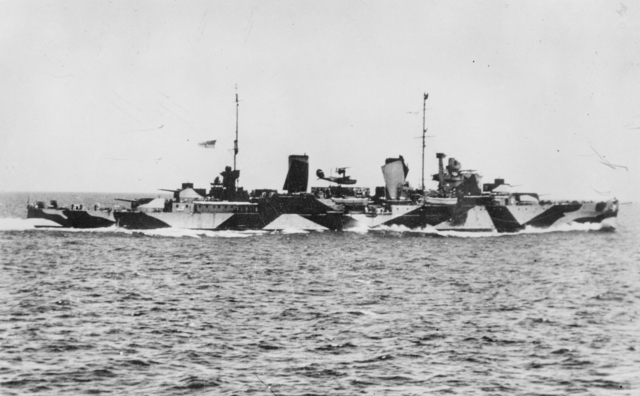
- HMAS Perth in February 1942
Date	28 February – 1 March 1942
Location	Sunda Strait, Dutch East Indies
Result	Japanese victory

Belligerents
United States; Australia; Netherlands	Japan

Commanders and leaders
(Australia) Hector Waller †; Albert H. Rooks †	(Empire of Japan) Kenzaburo Hara; (Empire of Japan) Takeo Kurita

Strength
American: 1 heavy cruiser; Australian: 1 light cruiser; Dutch: 1 destroyer	1 light carrier; 1 seaplane carrier; 5 cruisers; 12 destroyers; 1 minelayer; 1 minesweeper; 58 troopships

Casualties and losses
1 heavy cruiser sunk; 1 light cruiser sunk; 1 destroyer sunk; 1,071 killed; 675 POWs	1 minesweeper sunk (friendly fire); 4 troopships sunk or grounded (friendly fire); 1 cruiser damaged; 3 destroyers damaged; 10 killed; 37 wounded

The Battle of Sunda Strait was a naval battle which occurred during World War II in the Sunda Strait between the islands of Java, and Sumatra. On the night of 28 February – 1 March 1942, the Australian light cruiser HMAS Perth, American heavy cruiser USS Houston, and Dutch destroyer HNLMS Evertsen faced a major Imperial Japanese Navy (IJN) task force. After a fierce battle lasting several hours, all Allied ships were sunk. Five Japanese ships were sunk, three of them by friendly fire.

== Background ==
In late February 1942, Japanese amphibious forces were preparing to invade Java, in the Dutch East Indies. On 27 February, the main American-British-Dutch-Australian Command (ABDACOM) naval force, under Admiral Karel Doorman–a Dutch officer–steamed northeast from Surabaya to intercept an Imperial Japanese navy invasion fleet. This part of the ABDA force consisted of two heavy cruisers, including USS Houston under the command of Captain Albert H. Rooks, three light cruisers, including HMAS Perth under Captain Hector Waller, and nine destroyers. Only six out of nine of USS Houston's 8-inch (203 mm) heavy guns were operational because her aft gun turret had been knocked out in an earlier Japanese air raid. The ABDA force engaged the Japanese force in the Battle of the Java Sea. The Allied ships were all sunk or dispersed. Houston and Perth both retreated to Tanjung Priok, Java, the main port of Batavia, Dutch East Indies, where they arrived at 13:30 on 28 February.

== Prelude ==
In the early evening on 28 February, Houston, Perth and the Dutch destroyer HNLMS Evertsen received orders to depart Tanjung Priok and head through Sunda Strait to Tjilatjap, on the south coast of Java. Waller, who had seniority, was de facto commander of this force. The only ships they expected to encounter were Australian corvettes on patrol, in and around the strait itself. While Houston and Perth left at 19:00, Evertsen was not ready and followed the cruisers two hours later.

By chance, just after 22:00, a Japanese invasion convoy bound for West Java – including the entire Sixteenth Army, under Lieutenant General Hitoshi Imamura, in over 50 transport ships – was entering Bantam Bay, near the northwest tip of Java. The Japanese troop transports were escorted by the 5th Destroyer Flotilla, led by Rear Admiral Kenzaburo Hara, and the 7th Cruiser Division, under Vice Admiral Takeo Kurita. Light cruiser Natori (with Admiral Hara aboard), with the destroyers Harukaze, Hatakaze, Asakaze, Fubuki, Hatsuyuki, Shirayuki, Shirakumo, and Murakumo were closest to the convoy. Flanking the bay to the north were the heavy cruisers Mogami and Mikuma, accompanied by the destroyer Shikinami.

Slightly further north, though not involved in the action, was the aircraft carrier Ryūjō, with the heavy cruisers Suzuya and Kumano (with Admiral Kurita aboard), along with the seaplane tender Chiyoda, and the destroyers Isonami and Uranami.

Some time around 23:15, the Allied ships were sighted by the patrolling Fubuki, which followed them surreptitiously. At 23:06, when they were about halfway across the mouth of Bantam Bay, Perth sighted a ship about 5 mi (4.3 nmi; 8.0 km) ahead, near Saint Nicolaas Point. It was thought at first that the ship was an Australian corvette, but when challenged, she made an unintelligible reply, with a lamp which was the wrong color, fired her nine Long Lance (Type 93) torpedoes from about 3,000 yards (2,700 m) and then turned away, making smoke. The ship was soon identified as a Japanese destroyer (probably Harukaze). Waller reported the contact and ordered his forward turrets to open fire.

== Main action ==
During the fierce night action in the Battle of Sunda Strait, the Allied cruisers HMAS Perth and USS Houston found themselves encircled by a formidable Japanese task force. In an attempt to evade capture, they navigated westward, engaging Japanese transports that obstructed their path. However, their retreat was hindered as the return route to the Java Sea was blocked by Japanese heavy cruisers. After enduring extensive damage from torpedoes and shellfire, both Allied cruisers were abandoned and subsequently sank after midnight.

Friendly fire incidents occurred during the battle, resulting in the sinking of approximately four Japanese transports and the minesweeper W-2. Notably, the transport Ryujo Maru, carrying Lieutenant General Hitoshi Imamura, was among those sunk. Imamura was forced to leap overboard but was later rescued by a Japanese rescue boat and returned to shore.

The engagement concluded with significant Japanese casualties, including the loss of five ships, three due to friendly fire. Allied forces suffered heavy losses, with both HMAS Perth and USS Houston sunk, and survivors taken as prisoners of war.

== Destroyer action ==
Meanwhile, as Evertsen was trying to catch up with Houston and Perth, her crew spotted the tracers and intense shellfire of the main action. Her captain ordered a course northwest towards Pulau Mundu island, off the east coast of Sumatra, then hugged the Sumatran coast as Evertsen turned south to head through Sunda Strait.

However, Evertsen was spotted by Murakumo and Shirakumo, looking for more escaping Allied ships. Both immediately illuminated Evertsen with their searchlights and took her under fire. Evertsen attempted to evade by turning west, but after turning southward again, the Dutch destroyer again encountered the Japanese destroyers. Evertsen was hit repeatedly, but temporarily disengaged under a smokescreen. By then, however, Evertsen's stern was on fire. Still taking Japanese fire, the captain ordered his crew to ground Evertsen on a coastal reef. Firing all her torpedoes, the remaining crew escaped ashore before the fire reached the aft magazine, causing an explosion that blew off most of the stern.

== Aftermath ==
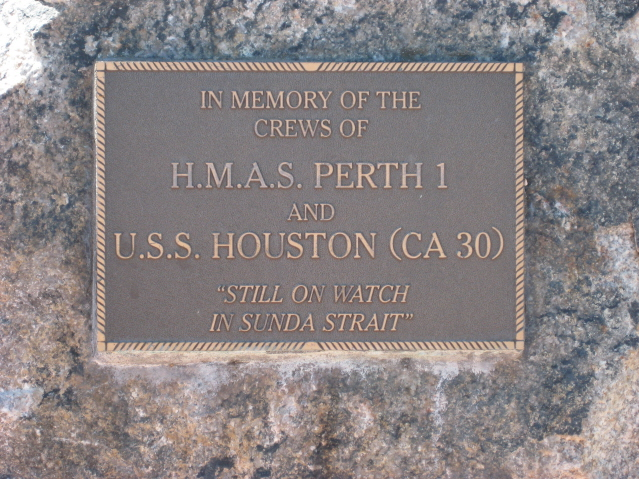
Commemorative plaque for HMAS Perth and USS Houston at Rockingham Naval Memorial Park in Rockingham, Western Australia.

Officially the Allied personnel killed during the battle included 696 members of the crew of Houston and 375 from Perth, including the captains of both vessels, Rooks and Waller. The survivors were picked up by Japanese vessels and taken prisoner, included 368 from Houston and 307 from Perth. Rooks was posthumously awarded the Medal of Honor for his actions. The majority of Evertsen's crew was taken prisoner on 9–10 March 1942 and were held by the Japanese for three and a half years.

The crew of the Japanese cruiser Mikuma suffered six killed and 11 wounded, as a result of damage caused by Houston. A direct shell hit to the bridge of the destroyer Shirayuki killed one crew member and wounded 11; Harukaze suffered hits to her bridge, engine room and rudder, killing three and wounding more than 15 others.

== See also ==
- Burma Railway
- Houston Volunteers
- Lost Battalion (Pacific, World War II)
