= Convoy SL 140/MKS 31 =

Convoys during naval battles of the Second World War

- Part of World War II
| Date | 24 November-5 December 1943 |
| Location | Mid Atlantic |
| Result | Allied victory |

Belligerents
| Nazi Germany | United Kingdom United States |

Commanders and leaders
| Adm. Karl Dönitz | Comm: Escort:Cdr EC Bayldon |

Strength
| 13 U-boats | 65 ships 18 escorts |

Casualties and losses
| 6 U-boats lost, 2 U-boats damaged | none |

Convoys SL 140/MKS 31 was a combined Allied convoy which ran during the Battle of the Atlantic in World War II, sailing to Britain in November 1943. SL convoys originated in Freetown, Sierra Leone, with their destination Liverpool and other ports in Britain. This was the 140th convoy to make that trip in WWII. SL 140 was composed of merchant ships bringing raw materials to the UK from various parts of the world. MKS was the designation for convoys from the Mediterranean to Britain. MK indicated ‘Mediterranean to the UK'. More than 100 MK convoys operated during the war. The S in this acronym specified ‘slow.’ This was a slow convoy, since it included thirteen LSTs, which had a top speed of about 10 knots. The LSTs and the additional landing craft they carried would be vital for the upcoming invasion of northern France.

These two convoys rendezvoused off Gibraltar on 24 November 1943 and sailed north.

They were the subject of a U-boat attack, as part of the Kriegsmarine's renewed Autumn offensive.

== Background ==
Following the renewal of the U-boat offensive in the Atlantic, convoys on the UK/Gibraltar routes had again come under attack, leading to clashes over Convoy SL 138/MKS 28 and Convoy SL 139/MKS 30. The SL/MKS convoys sailing at this time were of great importance in the Allied war effort for two reasons. First, the ships comprised in the SL portion carried important raw materials for Britain. Even more important were the landing ships: Thirty-four LSTs were part of these three SL/MKS convoys, moving from the action in North Africa, Sicily and Italy to now prepare for D-Day at Normandy, which would happen the next June. LSTs would be crucial in Operation Overlord. By the time of the final planning stages for the invasion of France, D-Day couldn’t take place until there were enough LSTs available to get the job done. Winston Churchill was frustrated that the fate of the war effort depended on bringing a sufficient number of LSTs to England.

German U-boat Control (BdU) had subsequently re-organized its patrol lines off the coast of Portugal, in order as to find and attack the next convoys on this route. Most MKS convoys combined with SL convoys, resulting in more efficient use of the escorting ships and aircraft.

== Protagonists ==
SL 140 left Freetown on 12 November 1943, arriving off Gibraltar on 24 November. It comprised 35 ships and was escorted by an Escort Group of four warships. MKS 31 sailed from Port Said on 13 November. The LSTs in the group sailed from Oran, Algeria, on 22 November, and they all passed through the Strait of Gibraltar to meet SL.140 on 24 November. The combined convoy of about 65 ships sailed for Britain, escorted eventually by 18 escorts including the B-1 Escort Group (seven warships), led by HMS Hurricane, (Commander EC Bayldon).

Opposing this force was wolf pack Weddigen, consisting initially of seventeen U-boats, comprising boats already on station from the disbanded Schill group, with reinforcements from the North Atlantic and from bases in occupied France. The number of submarines in the group was quickly reduced when two returned to base and one (U-538) was sunk on 21 November. Then U-648 disappeared, with its last transmission given on 22 November. There is a report that U-648 may have been sunk by British frigates.

== Action ==
The combined convoy was sighted by German aircraft in the late afternoon of 26 November, west of Cape St Vincent, but were able to evade the shadow with a radical course change during the night. The escorting group was reinforced by the destroyer Watchman, also on the 26th.

On 27 November the convoy was discovered again by aircraft, which brought in U-262. She commenced shadowing until other Weddigen boats could be homed-in. Also during the 27th the convoy was joined by 4 EG, a Support Group of five frigates led by HMS Bentinck (Cdr EH Chavasse). By evening the U-boats had gathered and started their assault. Franke, in U-262 reported that he was able to penetrate the escort screen into the convoy itself. Once in position he said that he attacked the ships there from close range, a tactic used by aces Kretschmer and Schepke two to three years earlier. However his boldness was not rewarded by any success; he fired at, and claimed hits on, three ships, but no hits were confirmed. The three other boats that penetrated the screen, U-764, U-107, and U-238, also failed to make any hits.

With this large number of escorts – including several with much experience in sinking German submarines – plus Allied aircraft defending the combined convoy, there was significant danger for the German U-boats. Three additional boats assigned to wolf pack Weddigen were destroyed in the final week of November 1943. If we add to that U-391, which was sunk on 13 December by a British Liberator aircraft on its voyage back to base, six of the submarines assigned to Weddigen never returned.

U-boats from Wolfpack Weddigen lost or damaged - November 1943
| | date | fate | |
|---|---|---|---|
| U-538 | 21 Nov | sunk by HMS Foley & HMS Crane | 17 crew rescued |
| U-648 | 23 Nov? | last transmission 22 Nov | all hands lost (50) |
| U-600 | 25 Nov | sunk by HMS Bazeley & HMS Blackwood | all hands lost (54) |
| U-542 | 28 Nov | sunk by British Wellington aircraft | all hands lost (56) |
| U-86 | 29 Nov | sunk by HMS Tumult & HMS Rocket | all hands lost (50) |
| U-391 | | damaged by British Wellington on 28 Nov; sunk by British Liberator 13 Dec | all hands lost (51) |
| U-238 | 30 Nov | damaged by aircraft from USS Bogue | 2 killed, 5 injured |

During the night the convoy was again reinforced by the arrival of 2 EG, a Support Group led by Captain F.J. "Johnnie" Walker, Britain's most successful anti-submarine warfare commander, in HMS Starling. This brought the total number of escorts for the convoy to seventeen warships.

In addition to the ships, Allied aircraft were overhead during the night to assist in defending the convoy. In the darkness of the night of November 27/28 a British Wellington bomber piloted by airman Thomas Wilkin discovered U-764 and attacked. The aircraft was equipped with high intensity lights to illuminate their target. The U-boat returned fire and the bomber crashed. Officer Wilkin and three others in his crew perished. Other German submarines were very near the crash site, and the two crew members from the Wellington who survived were picked up by U-238 to become POWs.

U-238’s skipper, Horst Hepp, radioed a long account of his interrogation of the captured airmen, which was intercepted and tracked by HF/DF (radio direction finding). Hepp was meanwhile ordered to meet U-764, which was returning to base, in order to transfer the prisoners. Allied forces were sent to intercept the two U-boats, with a view to rescuing the airmen, and prevent the two boats from getting away. Both U-764 and U-238 were attacked the following day by aircraft from the USS Bogue; both were damaged but were able to escape.

Also on 28 November, 2 EG located U-842 and subjected her to a prolonged attack, but she also was able to escape.

By now with significant losses, and outnumbered by the convoy escort, Weddigen had little chance of achieving any success; BdU ordered a halt to the attack. Convoy SL.140/MKS.31 continued their passage and despite being slowed by a huge Atlantic storm made it safely to England without further incident, the individual ships each then moving to their intended destinations. It is noted in the deck log of U.S.S. LST-311 that they passed the Isles of Scilly on 4 December and the thirteen LSTs then anchored in Plymouth on the 5th.

== Aftermath ==
Wolf pack Weddigen was a complete failure. Despite the energy of the attack on SL 140/MKS 31 no ships in this convoy were even damaged. The escort had successfully beaten off every attack. Six of the U-boats assigned to this group were destroyed, a major loss for the German navy.

All of the raw materials transported by the merchant ships in the combined convoy reached Britain. Everyone of the landing ships, crucial for the upcoming invasion of Normandy, arrived safely. Each LST carried an LCT plus several other smaller landing ships, so as many as sixty or seventy landing ships and landing craft used in Operation Overlord arrived in England with this convoy.
