= Gillett (surname) =

Gillett is a surname. Notable people with the surname include:

- Aden Gillett (born 1958), British actor
- Aidan Gillett (born 1986), Australian actor and stunt performer
- Amy Gillett (1976–2005), Australian track cyclist and rower
- Andrew Gillett, Australian historian
- Burt Gillett (1891–1971), American director of animated films
- Charles Gillett (1880–1964), British army officer and cricketer
- Charlie Gillett (1942–2010), British radio presenter, musicologist and writer
- Dave Gillett (born 1951), Scottish footballer
- David Gillett (born 1945), British Anglican bishop
- David Gillett (cricketer) (born 1969), English cricketer
- Debra Gillett, English actress
- Edward Frank Gillett (1874–1927), British artist and illustrator.
- Emma Gillett (1852–1927), American lawyer and women's rights activist
- Emma Gillett Oglesby (1845–1928), American anti-suffragist
- Eric William Gillett (1899–1987), Australian lawyer and university officer
- Ezra Hall Gillett (1823–1875), American clergyman and author
- Harold Gillett (1890–1976), Lord Mayor of London
- Herbert Gillett (1915–1995), Canadian merchant and politician in Newfoundland
- Hugh Gillett (1836–1915), English first-class cricketer and clergyman
- Ian Gillett (1928–2008), Australian rules footballer
- Ivor Gillett (1928–1950), George Cross recipient
- Katharine Gillett-Gatty (1870–1952), journalist, lecturer and suffragette
- James B. Gillett (1856–1937), Texas Ranger
- James Gillett (1860–1937), Republican politician and 22nd Governor of California from 1907 to 1911
- Jarred Gillett (born 1986), Australian football (soccer) referee
- John Gillett (1925–1995), British film critic
- John H. Gillett (1860–1920), Justice of the Indiana Supreme Court
- Joseph Ashby Gillett (1795–1853), English textile manufacturer and banker
- Laddie Gillett (2007–2021), Belizean police shooting victim
- Les Gillett (born 1970), English international indoor and lawn bowls player
- Leslie Gillett (1881–1969), American football coach
- Leonard Gillett (1861–1915), English football goalkeeper
- Lucy Gillett (born 1993), professional footballer and goalkeeper
- Margaret Gillett (1930–2019), Australian-Canadian feminist academic
- Margaret Clark Gillett (1878–1962), British botanist and social reformer
- Mark Gillett, British software engineer and executive
- Marnie Gillett (1953–2004), American gallerist and arts administrator
- Mary Gillett (born 1958), Australian politician
- Matt Gillett (born 1988), Australian Rugby League player
- Max Gillett (1927–2011), Australian politician
- Melonie Gillett (born 1984), Belizean singer-songwriter
- Sir Michael Cavenagh Gillett (1907–1971), British ambassador
- Michael Gillett (born 1973), Australian former professional rugby league footballer
- Mildred Gillett (1909–2014), English local historian
- Sir Peter Gillett (1913–1989), British Army officer
- Ray Gillett (1917–1995), Australian rules footballer
- Sir Robin Gillett (1925–2009), British merchant navy captain, Lord Mayor of London
- Sara Stewart Gillett, Scottish actress as "Sara Stewart"
- Sarah Gillett (born 1956), British ambassador
- Scout Gillett, American indie folk musician
- Simon Gillett (born 1985), English footballer
- Simon Gillett (rower), Australian lightweight rower
- Stephen Gillett (born 1976), American businessman
- Tyler Gillett (born 1982), American film director, cinematographer, writer and producer
- Violet Gillett (1898–1996), Canadian painter and educator

== Disambiguation pages ==
- Alan Gillett (disambiguation)
- Frederick Gillett (disambiguation)
- George Gillett (disambiguation)
- Nicholas Gillett (disambiguation)
- Senator Gillett (disambiguation)

== See also ==
- Gillette (surname)
