= Wolfpack Weddigen =

German submarine warfare unit

Weddigen was a wolfpack of German U-boats that operated during the battle of the Atlantic in World War II.

== Service history ==
Weddigen was formed in November 1943 off the coast of Portugal, to intercept convoys sailing to and from Gibraltar, Mediterranean and South Atlantic. It was composed of U-boats from the disbanded patrol group Schill, with reinforcements from the North Atlantic and from bases in occupied France.

Weddigen originally numbered seventeen U-boats, though two had been destroyed in recent actions, and two others had to withdraw with damage. On 22 November the thirteen U-boats remaining formed a patrol line west of Portugal to await warning of an Allied convoy.

On 23 November one of the Weddigen boats, U-648, fell in with the frigate HMS Blackwood, of 4th Escort Group accompanying KMS 30 and was destroyed. On 25 November U-600 also fell in with KMS 30, and was attacked by Blackwood and Bazely, and destroyed.

On 27 November the Weddigen boats intercepted Convoy SL 140/MKS 31, and attacked it over the next five days, though without success. On 29 November U-86 was destroyed by aircraft from the carrier USS Bogue, while on 28th U-238 and U-764 had been attacked and damaged, also by aircraft from Bogue.

On 7 December Weddigen was disbanded, a number of U-boats returning to base, while others formed a cadre of a new patrol group, code-named Borkum.

== U-boats involved ==
Wolfpack Weddigen
Name	Flag	Commander	Class	Notes
U-86	Kriegsmarine	Walter Schug	Type VIIC submarine	Sunk 29 November 1943
U-107	Kriegsmarine	Volker Simmermacher	Type IXB submarine	
U-228	Kriegsmarine	Herbert Engel	Type VIIC submarine	
U-238	Kriegsmarine	Horst Hepp	Type VIIC submarine	
U-262	Kriegsmarine	Heinz Franke	Type VIIC submarine	
U-358	Kriegsmarine	Rolf Manke	Type VIIC submarine	
U-391	Kriegsmarine	Gert Dültgen	Type VIIC submarine	
U-424	Kriegsmarine	Günter Lüders	Type VIIC submarine	
U-542	Kriegsmarine	Christian-Brandt Coester	Type IXC submarine	sunk 28 November 1943
U-586	Kriegsmarine	Hans Götze	Type VIIC submarine	
U-600	Kriegsmarine	Bernhard Zurmühlen	Type VIIC submarine	sunk 25 November 1943
U-618	Kriegsmarine	Erich Faust	Type VIIC submarine	
U-648	Kriegsmarine	Peter-Arthur Stahl	Type VIIC submarine	sunk 23 November 1943
U-714	Kriegsmarine	Hans-Joachim Schwebcke	Type VIIC submarine	
U-764	Kriegsmarine	Hanskurt von Bremen	Type VIIC submarine	
U-843	Kriegsmarine	Oskar Herwartz	Type IXC/40 submarine	
U-969	Kriegsmarine	Max Dobbert	Type VIIC submarine	

== The name ==
Weddigen was named for Otto Weddigen, German World War I U-boat ace.
