= Gillet (disambiguation) =

Gillet is a Belgian automobile manufacturer.

Gillet may also refer to:

== Games ==
- Gillet (card game), an historical French card game.

== People ==
- Alexandre Gillet (born 1983), French actor
- André Gillet (1916-1993), Canadian politician
- Andy Gillet (born 1981), French model and actor
- Anthony Gillet (born 1976), French race walker
- Antoine Gillet (born 1988), Belgian sprinter
- Charles W. Gillet (1840-1908), American politician
- Claude Casimir Gillet (1806-1896), French biologist and mycologist
- Felix Gillet (1835-1908), French-American horticulturalist
- Fernand Gillet (1882-1980), French-American oboist, nephew of Georges
- Francis Warrington Gillet (1895-1969), American pilot
- François Gillet (born 1949), French photographer
- Georges Gillet (1854-1920), French oboist and composer, uncle of Fernand
- Gillet de La Tessonerie (1620-1660), French playwright
- Gillet de Laumont (1747-1834), French mineralogist
- Guillaume Gillet (born 1984), Belgian footballer
- Henri Gillet (born 1953), French-American mathematician
- Jean-François Gillet (born 1979), Belgian footballer
- Kenny Gillet (born 1976), French footballer
- Lev Gillet (1893-1980), French archimandrite
- Louis Gillet (1876-1943), French art and literary historian
- Maurice Gillet (1763-1833), French naval officer
- Nicolas Gillet (born 1976), French footballer
- Numa François Gillet (1868-?), French painter
- Paolo Gillet (1929–2026), Italian Roman Catholic bishop
- Pierre-Antoine Gillet (born 1991), Belgian basketball player
- Ransom H. Gillet (1800-1876), American politician
- Stéphane Gillet (born 1977), Luxembourger footballer
- Thierry Gillet (born 1969), French jockey
- Tony Gillet (born 1945), Belgian racing driver

== Companies ==
- Gillet Herstal, Belgian motorcycle manufacturer

== See also ==
- Gillett (disambiguation)
- Gillette (disambiguation)
- Gilet (disambiguation)
