= U86 =

U86 may refer to:

- German submarine U-86, various vessels
- HMS Pelican (U86), a sloop of the Royal Navy
- Small nucleolar RNA SNORD86
