= Gilet (disambiguation) =

A gilet is a sleeveless jacket.

Gilet may also refer to:

- Gilet, Valencia, a municipality in eastern Spain
- Gilet (card game)
- Gilet (name)

== See also ==
- Gillet (disambiguation)
- Gillet, a Belgian automobile manufacturer
- Gillette (disambiguation)
