= Wolfpack Schill =

- Active: 25 October - 16 November 1943
- Country: Nazi Germany
- Branch: Kriegsmarine
- Type: Wolfpack
- Size: 10 submarines

Commanders
- Notable commanders: Peter-Erich Cremer; Heinz Franke; Karl-Heinz Marbach

Wolfpack Schill 1
- Active: 16–22 November 1943
- Country: Nazi Germany
- Branch: Kriegsmarine
- Size: 8 submarines

Commanders
- Notable commanders: Peter-Erich Cremer; Heinz Franke; Werner Henke

Wolfpack Schill 2
- Active: 17–22 November 1943
- Country: Nazi Germany
- Branch: Kriegsmarine
- Size: 9 submarines

Wolfpack Schill 3
- Active: 18–22 November 1943
- Country: Nazi Germany
- Branch: Kriegsmarine
- Size: 9 submarines

Schill was a wolfpack of German U-boats that operated during the battle of the Atlantic in World War II.

== Service history ==
Following the resumption of the assault on the Atlantic convoy routes in the autumn of 1943, U-boat Control (Befehlshaber der Unterseeboote, BdU) switched the focus of the campaign in October to the mid- and South Atlantic routes. To this end, it established the wolfpack Schill off the coast of Portugal to intercept convoys sailing to and from Gibraltar, the Mediterranean, and the South Atlantic.

Schill comprised 10 U-boats, and commenced operations on 25 October. Its first action was against home-bound convoy SL 138/MKS 28. During this assault, the freighter Hallfried was sunk by U-262 on 29 October; however, U-306 was sunk by convoy escorts HMS Whitehall and HMS Geranium on 31 October. Following this attack, Schill remained on patrol, but had no further successes. On 9 November, U-707 was detected and sunk by Allied aircraft, a B-17 of 220 Squadron.

On 16 November Schill was reinforced and reorganized into three groups. The first, Schill 1, of eight U-boats, was the southernmost rake, running in a line to the west of Lisbon. The second, Schill 2, of nine U-boats, was aligned west of Cape Finisterre in Spain, while the third, Schill 3, also of nine U-boats, was 150 nautical miles (280 km) north of this, roughly along the 45th parallel.

On 18 November U-boats of Schill 1 opened the attack on convoy SL 139/MKS 30; over the next three days, the boats of all three Schill groups were involved with three U-boats destroyed. On 18 November U-211 was sunk by a Wellington bomber, and on the 19th, U-536 by Nene and Snowberry. On the 21st U-538, en route from the North Atlantic to join Schill, was caught and sunk by escorts Foley and Crane. Two aircraft were shot down on 20 November, a Liberator by U-648 and a Sunderland by U-618, but no ships were sunk from the convoy.

With the end of the convoy battle on 22 November, the Schill groups were disbanded; a number returned to base, while a cadre remained to form a new patrol line, code-named Weddigen.

== U-boats involved ==
(25 October-16 November 1943)
Schill

- U-211
- U-228
- U-262
- U-306 sunk 31 October 1943
- U-333
- U-358
- U-441
- U-466
- U-707 sunk 9 November 1943
- U-953

(16–22 November 1943)

Schill 1

- U-211 sunk 18 November 1943
- U-228
- U-262
- U-333
- U-358
- U-426
- U-515
- U-600

(U-538 sunk 21 Nov. en route to join)

Schill 2

- U-86
- U-238
- U-343
- U-536 sunk 19 November 1943
- U-586
- U-608
- U-648
- U-709
- U-969

Schill 3

- U-212
- U-391
- U-424
- U-542
- U-618
- U-714
- U-764
- U-843
- U-967
