= U57 =

U57 or U-57 may refer to:

- German submarine U-57, various vessels
- Great snub icosidodecahedron
- HMS Black Swan (U57), a sloop of the Royal Navy
- Small nucleolar RNA SNORD57
