= Small nucleolar RNA SNORD86 =

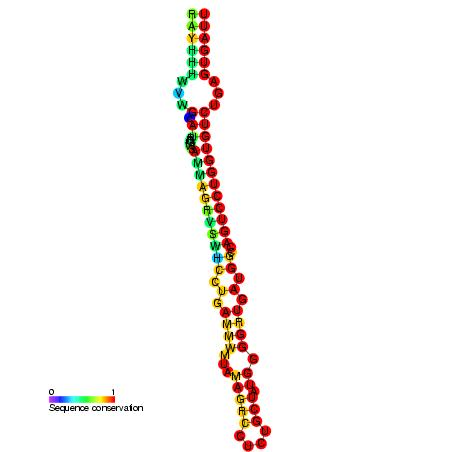
- Predicted secondary structure and sequence conservation of SNORD86

Identifiers
- Symbol: SNORD86
- Alt. Symbols: snoU86
- Rfam: RF00594

Other data
- RNA type: Gene; snRNA; snoRNA; C/D-box
- Domain: Eukaryota
- GO: GO:0006396 GO:0005730
- SO: SO:0000593
- PDB structures: PDBe

In molecular biology, Small nucleolar RNA SNORD86 (also known as U86) is a non-coding RNA (ncRNA) that belongs to the C/D family of snoRNAs. It is the human orthologue of Xenopus laevis U86 and has no identified RNA target. The snoRNAs U86, U56, U57 and HBII-55, of the C/D family, and the H/ACA box snoRNA ACA51 share the same host gene (NOL5A) with U86.
