= U56 =

U56 may refer to:

- German submarine U-56, various vessels
- Rhombicosahedron
- Small nucleolar RNA SNORD56
