= Gillette (surname) =

Gillette is a surname. Notable people with the surname include:

- Anita Gillette (born 1936), American actress and game-show panelist
- Arthur Gillette (1869–1921), American pediatric orthopedic surgeon
- Chester Gillette (1883–1908), American murderer
- Clarence Preston Gillette (1859–1941), American entomologist
- David Gillette (1946–2025), American paleontologist
- Douglas W. Gillette (1918–1942), American naval officer
- Elizabeth V. Gillette (1874–1965), New York physician, assemblywoman 1920
- Frank Gillette (born 1941), American video and installation artist
- Frank E. Gillette (1848–1923), American politician and judge, Associate Justice of the Oklahoma Territory Supreme Court (1902-1907)
- Guy Gillette (1879–1973), American politician from Iowa
- Jim Gillette (born 1967), American singer
- King C. Gillette (1855–1932), American businessman and founder of the Gillette Safety Razor Company
- Lee Gillette (1912–1981), American record producer and A&R director
- Mic Gillette (1951–2016), American brass player, member of the R&B band Tower of Power
- Paul Gillette (1938–1996), author and wine expert
- Sandra Gillette (born 1974), American singer and rapper known as Gillette (singer)
- William Gillette (1853–1937), American actor famous for his stage version of Sherlock Holmes

== Fictional characters ==
- Ray Gillette, a character in American animated sitcom Archer

== See also ==
- Gillette (disambiguation)
- Gillett (surname)
