= Small nucleolar RNA SNORD56 =

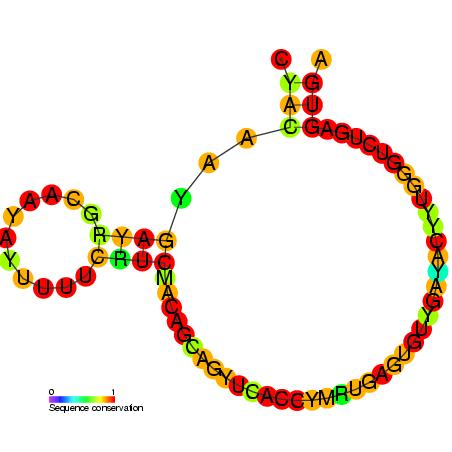
- Predicted secondary structure and sequence conservation of SNORD56

Identifiers
- Symbol: SNORD56
- Alt. Symbols: U56
- Rfam: RF00275

Other data
- RNA type: Gene; snRNA; snoRNA; C/D-box
- Domain: Eukaryota
- GO: GO:0006396 GO:0005730
- SO: SO:0000593
- PDB structures: PDBe

In molecular biology, snoRNA U56 (also known as SNORD56) is a non-coding RNA (ncRNA) molecule which functions in the modification of other small nuclear RNAs (snRNAs). This type of modifying RNA is usually located in the nucleolus of the eukaryotic cell which is a major site of snRNA biogenesis. It is known as a small nucleolar RNA (snoRNA) and also often referred to as a guide RNA.

snoRNA U56 belongs to the C/D box class of snoRNAs which contain the conserved sequence motifs known as the C box (UGAUGA) and the D box (CUGA). Most of the members of the box C/D family function in directing site-specific 2'-O-methylation of substrate RNAs.

U56 was originally cloned from HeLa cells and is predicted to guide the 2'O-ribose methylation of 18S ribosomal RNA (rRNA) residue C517. In the human genome U56 is encoded in the introns of the same host gene as several other snoRNAs (C/D box snoRNAs U57, U86 and HBII-55, and the H/ACA box snoRNA ACA51). This host gene encodes Nucleolar Protein 5A (NOL5A).
