= USS Gillette =

USS Gillette may refer to more than one United States Navy ship:

- USS Gillette (DE-31), an Evarts-class destroyer escort renamed USS Sederstrom just before commissioning in 1943. The ship served in World War II until 1945 and sold for scrap in 1947.
- USS Gillette (DE-270), a Evarts-class destroyer escort transferred to the United Kingdom upon completion which served in the Royal Navy as the Captain-class frigate HMS Foley (K474) from 1943 to 1945 and in the U.S. Navy briefly during 1945 as the destroyer escort USS Foley (DE-270)
- USS Gillette (DE-681), a Buckley-class destroyer escort in commission from 1943 to 1947
