= Nicholas Gillett =

Nicholas Gillett may refer to:

- Nicholas Gillett (peace educator), see The Parents Circle-Families Forum
- Sir Nicholas Danvers Penrose Gillett, 3rd Baronet (born 1955), of the Gillett baronets
- Nicolas Gillet (born 1976), French footballer

== See also ==
- Gillett (surname)
