= Charles Gillett =

English cricketer and solicitor

Personal information
- Full name: Charles Richard Gillett
- Born: 24 August 1880; Compton, Surrey, England
- Died: 22 January 1964 (aged 83); Camberley, Surrey, England
- Batting: Unknown
- Relatives: Hugh Gillett (father)

Domestic team information
- Years: Team
- 1881: Marylebone Cricket Club

Career statistics
Competition	First-class
Matches	1
Runs scored	5
Batting average	2.50
100s/50s	–/–
Top score	3
Catches/stumpings	1/–
- Source: Cricinfo, 5 May 2021

Charles Richard Gillett DSO (24 August 1880 – 22 January 1964) was an English first-class cricketer and British Army officer.

The son of the cricketer and clergyman Hugh Gillett, he was born in August 1880 at Compton, Surrey. He began his military career in January 1900, when he graduated from the Royal Military Academy and was commissioned as a second lieutenant into the Royal Artillery. Promotion to lieutenant followed in April 1901, with Gillett appointed a gunnery instructor in April 1906. He was promoted to captain in December 1910 and was made an adjutant in February 1912.

Gillett served in the First World War, which began in the summer of 1914, with the Royal Artillery, during which he was promoted to major in July 1915. He was decorated by France with the Croix de Guerre in December 1916 and was awarded the Distinguished Service Order in the 1917 New Year Honours. He was appointed to the staff in January 1917 as a Deputy Assistant Adjutant General, He was made a brevet lieutenant colonel in June 1918.

Following the war, he made a single appearance in first-class cricket for the Marylebone Cricket Club against the British Army cricket team at Lord's in 1920. Batting twice in the match, he made scores of 3 and 2, being dismissed by Fernley Marrison and Charles Sutton respectively. By November 1928, he held the rank of colonel. He was appointed an aide-de-camp to George V in February 1934, serving his successors Edward VIII and George VI. Gillett retired from active service in October 1937.

He died at the age of 83 at Camberley in January 1964.
