= Giler =

Giler is a surname. Notable people with the surname include:

- David Giler (1943–2020), American filmmaker
- Franjo Giler (1907–1943), Yugoslav footballer

== See also ==
- Giles (surname)
- Gilet (name)
