= German submarine U-86 (1941) =

German World War II submarine

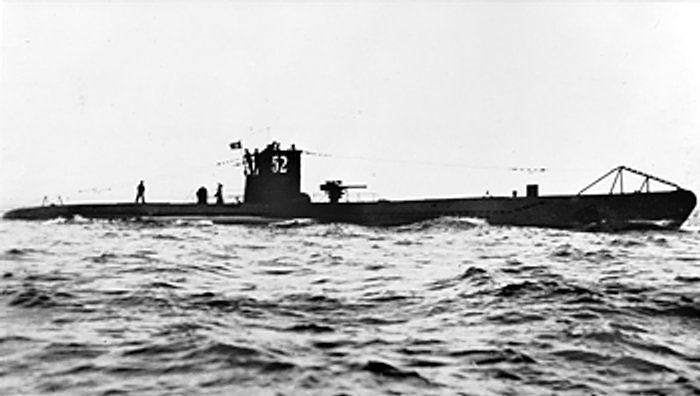
- U-52, a typical Type VIIB boat

History

Nazi Germany
- Name: U-86
- Ordered: 9 June 1938
- Builder: Flender Werke, Lübeck
- Cost: 4,714,000 Reichsmark
- Yard number: 282
- Laid down: 20 January 1940
- Launched: 10 May 1941
- Commissioned: 8 July 1941
- Fate: Sunk, 29 November 1943

General characteristics
- Class & type: Type VIIB U-boat
- Displacement: 753 t (741 long tons) surfaced; 857 t (843 long tons) submerged
- Length: 66.50 m (218 ft 2 in) o/a; 48.80 m (160 ft 1 in) pressure hull
- Beam: 6.20 m (20 ft 4 in) o/a; 4.70 m (15 ft 5 in) pressure hull
- Draught: 4.74 m (15 ft 7 in)
- Installed power: 2,800–3,200 PS (2,100–2,400 kW; 2,800–3,200 bhp) (diesels); 750 PS (550 kW; 740 shp) (electric)
- Propulsion: 2 shafts; 2 × diesel engines; 2 × electric motors
- Speed: 17.9 knots (33.2 km/h; 20.6 mph) surfaced; 8 knots (15 km/h; 9.2 mph)
- Range: 8,700 nmi (16,100 km; 10,000 mi) at 10 knots (19 km/h; 12 mph) surfaced; 90 nmi (170 km; 100 mi) at 4 knots (7.4 km/h; 4.6 mph) submerged
- Test depth: 220 m (720 ft); Crush depth: 230–250 m (750–820 ft)
- Complement: 4 officers, 40–56 enlisted
- Sensors & processing systems: Gruppenhorchgerät
- Armament: 5 × 53.3 cm (21 in) torpedo tubes (four bow, one stern); 14 × torpedoes or 26 TMA mines; 1 × 8.8 cm (3.46 in) deck gun (220 rounds); 1 × 2 cm (0.79 in) C/30 anti-aircraft gun

Service record
- Part of: 5th U-boat Flotilla; 8 July – 31 August 1941; 1st U-boat Flotilla; 1 September 1941 – 29 November 1943
- Identification codes: M 46 726
- Commanders: Oblt.z.S. / Kptlt. Walter Schug; 8 July 1941 – 29 November 1943
- Operations: 8 patrols: 1st patrol: 7 – 22 December 1941; 2nd patrol: 27 December – 15 February 1942; 3rd patrol: 25 March – 26 May 1942; 4th patrol: 2 July – 18 September 1942; 5th patrol: 31 October 1942 – 7 January 1943; 6th patrol: 24 February – 16 April 1943; 7th patrol: a. 8 July – 11 September 1943; b. 30 October – 1 November 1943; 8th patrol: 11 – 29 November 1943
- Victories: 3 merchant ships sunk (9,614 GRT); 1 merchant ship damaged (8,627 GRT)

German submarine U-86 was a Type VIIB U-boat of Nazi Germany's Kriegsmarine during World War II.

She was laid down at the Flender Werke in Lübeck on 20 January 1940 as yard number 282. Launched on 10 May 1941, she was commissioned on 8 July and completed training with the 5th U-boat Flotilla under the command of Kapitänleutnant (Kptlt.) Walter Schug. She was reassigned to the 1st flotilla, initially for further training on 1 September before being ready for operations from 1 December. She stayed with that organization until her loss on 29 November 1943.

U-86 completed eight war patrols with the flotilla, sinking three ships, totalling 9,614 gross register tons (GRT). She also damaged a ship of 8,627 GRT. She was a member of ten wolfpacks.

She was sunk on 29 November 1943 east of the Azores, in position 40°52'N, 18°54'W, by depth charges from two British warships, HMS Rocket (H92) and HMS Tumult (R11). All 50 hands were lost.

== Design ==
German Type VIIB submarines were preceded by the shorter Type VIIA submarines. U-86 had a displacement of 753 tonnes (741 long tons) when at the surface and 857 tonnes (843 long tons) while submerged. She had a total length of 66.50 m (218 ft 2 in), a pressure hull length of 48.80 m (160 ft 1 in), a beam of 6.20 m (20 ft 4 in), a height of 9.50 m (31 ft 2 in), and a draught of 4.74 m (15 ft 7 in). The submarine was powered by two MAN M 6 V 40/46 four-stroke, six-cylinder supercharged diesel engines producing a total of 2,800 to 3,200 metric horsepower (2,060 to 2,350 kW; 2,760 to 3,160 shp) for use while surfaced, two BBC GG UB 720/8 double-acting electric motors producing a total of 750 metric horsepower (550 kW; 740 shp) for use while submerged. She had two shafts and two 1.23 m (4 ft) propellers. The boat was capable of operating at depths of up to 230 metres (750 ft).

The submarine had a maximum surface speed of 17.9 knots (33.2 km/h; 20.6 mph) and a maximum submerged speed of 8 knots (15 km/h; 9.2 mph). When submerged, the boat could operate for 90 nautical miles (170 km; 100 mi) at 4 knots (7.4 km/h; 4.6 mph); when surfaced, she could travel 8,700 nautical miles (16,100 km; 10,000 mi) at 10 knots (19 km/h; 12 mph). U-86 was fitted with five 53.3 cm (21 in) torpedo tubes (four fitted at the bow and one at the stern), fourteen torpedoes, one 8.8 cm (3.46 in) SK C/35 naval gun, 220 rounds, and one 2 cm (0.79 in) anti-aircraft gun The boat had a complement of between forty-four and sixty.

== Service history ==
=== First patrol ===
U-86 departed Kiel on 7 December 1941 for her first patrol. She docked at Brest on the French Atlantic coast on the 22nd where she would be based for the rest of her career.

=== Second patrol ===
U-86's second patrol started on 27 December 1941. She damaged the British Toorak on 16 January 1942. On the 18th, she sank the Greek Dimitios G. Thermiotis.

=== Third and fourth patrols ===
On her third foray, she left Brest on 25 March 1942. It was relatively uneventful. She returned on 26 May.

Sortie number four began on 2 July 1942. On 6 August, she sank an American sailing ship, the Wawaloam with her deck gun.

=== Fifth, sixth and seventh patrols ===
This (fifth) outing was also quiet, starting on 31 October 1942 and finishing on 7 January 1943.

Having left Brest on 24 February 1943, she encountered and sank her final victim, the Norwegian Brant County on 11 March.

U-86's seventh patrol was between 8 July and 11 September 1943.

=== Eighth patrol and loss ===
The boat departed Brest for the last time on 11 November 1943. She was sunk east of the Azores on the 29 November 1943 by depth charges from the British destroyers HMS Tumult and HMS Rocket.

50 men died; there were no survivors.

=== Previously recorded fate ===
U-86 was listed as missing in the North Atlantic from 28 November 1943.

The boat was claimed sunk by aircraft from the USS Bogue on 29 November 1943. This attack was subsequently attributed to U-764 which escaped undamaged.

=== Wolfpacks ===
U-86 took part in ten wolfpacks, namely:

- Zieten (7 – 22 January 1942)
- Wolf (13 – 31 July 1942)
- Natter (6 – 8 November 1942)
- Westwall (8 November - 16 December 1942)
- Neuland (4 – 13 March 1943)
- Dränger (14 – 20 March 1943)
- Seewolf (21 – 30 March 1943)
- Without name (11 – 29 July 1943)
- Schill 2 (17 – 22 November 1943)
- Weddigen (22 – 29 November 1943)

== Summary of raiding history ==
Date	Ship	Nationality	Tonnage	Fate
16 January 1942	Toorak	United Kingdom	8,627	Damaged
18 January 1942	Dimitrios G. Thermiotis	Greece	4,271	Sunk
6 August 1942	Wawaloam	United States	342	Sunk
11 March 1943	Brant County	Norway	5,001	Sunk

== Bibliography ==
- Bishop, C (2006). Kriegsmarine U-Boats, 1939–45. Amber Books.
- Busch, Rainer; Röll, Hans-Joachim (1999). German U-boat commanders of World War II : a biographical dictionary. Translated by Brooks, Geoffrey. London, Annapolis, Md: Greenhill Books, Naval Institute Press. ISBN 1-55750-186-6.
- Busch, Rainer; Röll, Hans-Joachim (1999). Der U-Boot-Krieg, 1939-1945: Deutsche U-Boot-Verluste von September 1939 bis Mai 1945 [German U-boat losses from September 1939 to May 1945] (in German). Vol. IV. Hamburg, Berlin, Bonn: Mittler. ISBN 3-8132-0514-2.
- Gröner, Eric; Jung, Dieter; Maass, Martin (1991). German Warships 1815-1945: U-boats and Mine Warfare Vessels. Vol. 2. Translated by Thomas, Keith; Magowan, Rachel. London: Conway Maritime Press. ISBN 0-85177-593-4.
- Gröner, Eric H (1990). German Warships, 1815–1945. Conway Maritime Press.
- Hickam, Homer. Torpedo Junction. Annapolis, MD: Naval Institute Press.
