= Senator Gillette =

Senator Gillette may refer to:

- Francis Gillette (1807–1879), U.S. Senator from Connecticut
- Guy Gillette (1879–1973), U.S. Senator from Iowa

== See also ==
- Senator Gillett (disambiguation)
