= German submarine U-238 =

German World War II submarine

History

Nazi Germany
- Name: U-238
- Ordered: 20 January 1941
- Builder: Germaniawerft, Kiel
- Yard number: 668
- Laid down: 21 April 1942
- Launched: 7 January 1943
- Commissioned: 20 February 1943
- Fate: Sunk, 9 February 1944

General characteristics
- Class & type: Type VIIC submarine
- Displacement: 769 tonnes (757 long tons) surfaced; 871 t (857 long tons) submerged
- Length: 67.10 m (220 ft 2 in) o/a; 50.50 m (165 ft 8 in) pressure hull
- Beam: 6.20 m (20 ft 4 in) o/a; 4.70 m (15 ft 5 in) pressure hull
- Height: 9.60 m (31 ft 6 in)
- Draught: 4.74 m (15 ft 7 in)
- Installed power: 2,800–3,200 PS (2,100–2,400 kW; 2,800–3,200 bhp) (diesels); 750 PS (550 kW; 740 shp) (electric)
- Propulsion: 2 shafts; 2 × diesel engines; 2 × electric motors
- Speed: 17.7 knots (32.8 km/h; 20.4 mph) surfaced; 7.6 knots (14.1 km/h; 8.7 mph) submerged
- Range: 8,500 nmi (15,700 km; 9,800 mi) at 10 knots (19 km/h; 12 mph) surfaced; 80 nmi (150 km; 92 mi) at 4 knots (7.4 km/h; 4.6 mph) submerged
- Test depth: 230 m (750 ft); Crush depth: 250–295 m (820–968 ft)
- Complement: 4 officers, 40–56 enlisted
- Armament: 5 × 53.3 cm (21 in) torpedo tubes (four bow, one stern); 14 × torpedoes or 26 TMA mines; 1 × 8.8 cm (3.46 in) deck gun (220 rounds); 2 × twin 2 cm (0.79 in) C/30 anti-aircraft guns

Service record
- Part of: 5th U-boat Flotilla; 20 February – 31 July 1943; 1st U-boat Flotilla; 1 August 1943 – 9 February 1944
- Identification codes: M 50 141
- Commanders: Oblt.z.S. / Kptlt. Horst Hepp; 20 February 1943 – 9 February 1944
- Operations: 3 patrols: 1st patrol: 5 September – 8 October 1943; 2nd patrol: 11 November – 12 December 1943; 3rd patrol: 27 January – 9 February 1944
- Victories: 4 merchant ships sunk (23,048 GRT); 1 merchant ship damaged (7,176 GRT)

German submarine U-238 was a Type VIIC U-boat of Nazi Germany's Kriegsmarine built for service in the Second World War. She was laid down on 21 April 1942, by Germaniawerft of Kiel as yard number 668, launched on 7 January 1943 and commissioned on 20 February, with Oberleutnant zur See Horst Hepp in command. Hepp commanded her for her entire career, receiving promotion to Kapitänleutnant in the process.

== Design ==
German Type VIIC submarines were preceded by the shorter Type VIIB submarines. U-238 had a displacement of 769 tonnes (757 long tons) when at the surface and 871 tonnes (857 long tons) while submerged. She had a total length of 67.10 m (220 ft 2 in), a pressure hull length of 50.50 m (165 ft 8 in), a beam of 6.20 m (20 ft 4 in), a height of 9.60 m (31 ft 6 in), and a draught of 4.74 m (15 ft 7 in). The submarine was powered by two Germaniawerft F46 four-stroke, six-cylinder supercharged diesel engines producing a total of 2,800 to 3,200 metric horsepower (2,060 to 2,350 kW; 2,760 to 3,160 shp) for use while surfaced, two AEG GU 460/8–27 double-acting electric motors producing a total of 750 metric horsepower (550 kW; 740 shp) for use while submerged. She had two shafts and two 1.23 m (4 ft) propellers. The boat was capable of operating at depths of up to 230 metres (750 ft).

The submarine had a maximum surface speed of 17.7 knots (32.8 km/h; 20.4 mph) and a maximum submerged speed of 7.6 knots (14.1 km/h; 8.7 mph). When submerged, the boat could operate for 80 nautical miles (150 km; 92 mi) at 4 knots (7.4 km/h; 4.6 mph); when surfaced, she could travel 8,500 nautical miles (15,700 km; 9,800 mi) at 10 knots (19 km/h; 12 mph). U-238 was fitted with five 53.3 cm (21 in) torpedo tubes (four fitted at the bow and one at the stern), fourteen torpedoes, one 8.8 cm (3.46 in) SK C/35 naval gun, 220 rounds, and two twin 2 cm (0.79 in) C/30 anti-aircraft guns. The boat had a complement of between forty-four and sixty.

== Service history ==
U-238 was a member of four wolfpacks; she was a successful, if short lived boat, sinking four freighters and damaging another during her operations against Allied convoys in the Battle of the Atlantic. She had the misfortune, however, of serving at the turning point of the war, when Allied countermeasures were taking a heavy toll on the U-boat force. She conducted three war patrols, beginning in September 1943, following her warm-up trials in the Baltic Sea.

=== War Patrols ===
U-238's first patrol was conducted from Trondheim in Norway as part of the 1st U-boat Flotilla, and entailed the submarine exiting the North Sea via the Denmark Strait and operating against Allied shipping in the so-called "air cover gap" in the Central Atlantic, where Allied aircraft had insufficient range, on account of fuel limitations, to effectively operate against German U-boats. This first patrol was by far the most successful, as on 20 September 1943, the boat attacked a large convoy, sinking one 7,176 GRT cargo ship and damaging another. This was followed by three more victims on 23 September, when two Norwegian ships and a British freighter were sunk from the same convoy.

U-238's second patrol was less successful. Two weeks after leaving Brest, on the French Atlantic coast, she was attacked by a Grumman TBF Avenger torpedo bomber from the escort carrier USS Bogue (CVE-9), whose rockets killed two crew members and wounded five more, prompting the submarine to return to Brest with severe damage, which put her out of service for a month. It was during this patrol that the submarine captured two British Royal Air Force personnel whose Vickers Wellington bomber had been shot down by U-764.

U-238's third and last patrol began in January 1944, and lasted a fruitless month, until on 9 February, she was caught by convoy escorts of SL-147 and MKS-38 270 nautical miles (500 km) off Cape Clear. She counter-attacked, unsuccessfully, and was sunk by the sloops HMS Kite, Magpie and Starling. There were no survivors.

=== Wolfpacks ===
U-238 took part in four wolfpacks, namely:

- Leuthen (15 – 24 September 1943)
- Schill 2 (17 – 22 November 1943)
- Weddigen (22 November – 1 December 1943)
- Igel 2 (4 – 9 February 1944)

== Summary of raiding history ==
Date	Ship Name	Nationality	Tonnage (GRT)	Fate
20 September 1943	Frederick Douglass	United States	7,176	Damaged
20 September 1943	Theodore Dwight Weld	United States	7,176	Sunk
23 September 1943	Fort Jemseg	United Kingdom	7,134	Sunk
23 September 1943	Oregon Express	Norway	3,642	Sunk
23 September 1943	Skjelbred	Norway	5,096	Sunk

== Bibliography ==
- Busch, Rainer; Röll, Hans-Joachim (1999a). German U-boat commanders of World War II : a biographical dictionary. Translated by Brooks, Geoffrey. London, Annapolis, Md: Greenhill Books, Naval Institute Press. ISBN 1-55750-186-6.
- Busch, Rainer; Röll, Hans-Joachim (1999b). Deutsche U-Boot-Verluste von September 1939 bis Mai 1945 [German U-boat losses from September 1939 to May 1945]. Der U-Boot-Krieg (in German). Vol. IV. Hamburg, Berlin, Bonn: Mittler. ISBN 3-8132-0514-2.
- Edwards (1996). Dönitz and the Wolf Packs: The U-boats at War. Cassell Military Classics. pp. 217, 221. ISBN 0-304-35203-9.
- Gröner, Erich; Jung, Dieter; Maass, Martin (1991). U-boats and Mine Warfare Vessels. German Warships 1815–1945. Vol. 2. Translated by Thomas, Keith; Magowan, Rachel. London: Conway Maritime Press. ISBN 0-85177-593-4.
- Kemp, Paul (1999). U-Boats Destroyed: German Submarine Losses in the World Wars. London: Arms & Armour. ISBN 1-85409-515-3.
- Sharpe, Peter (1998). U-Boat Fact File. Great Britain: Midland Publishing. ISBN 1-85780-072-9.
