= German submarine U-57 =

U-57 may refer to one of the following German submarines:

- SM U-57, the lead ship of the Type U 57 class of submarines; launched in 1915 and that served in the First World War until surrendered on 24 November 1918; broken up at Cherbourg in 1921
  - During the First World War, Germany also had these submarines with similar names:
    - SM UB-57, a Type UB III submarine launched in 1917 and sunk on 14 August 1918
    - SM UC-57, a Type UC II submarine launched in 1916 and disappeared after 18 November 1917
- German submarine U-57 (1938), a Type IIC submarine that served in the Second World War until sunk 3 September 1940; raised later in the month and returned to service on 11 January 1941; scuttled on 3 May 1945
