= Gilet (name) =

Gilet is both a given name and a surname. Notable people with the name include:

- Don Gilet (born 1967), British actor
- Gilet Velut (fl. early 15th century), French composer
- Gilét Smaragd (fl. 1258–1266), Hungarian noble of French origin

== See also ==
- Giler
- Giles (surname)
