= Senator Gillett =

Senator Gillett may refer to:

- Frederick H. Gillett (1851–1935), Massachusetts State Senate
- James Gillett (1860–1937), California State Senate

== See also ==
- Senator Gillette (disambiguation)
