= German submarine U-86 =

U-86 may refer to one of the following German submarines:

- SM U-86, a Type U 81 submarine launched in 1916 and that served in the First World War until surrendered on 20 November 1918; sank in English Channel on the way to being broken up in 1921
  - During the First World War, Germany also had this submarine with a similar name:
    - SM UB-86, a Type UB III submarine launched in 1917 and surrendered on 24 November 1918; dumped on beach at Falmouth after explosive trials 1921 and broken up in situ
- German submarine U-86 (1941), a Type VIIB submarine that served in the Second World War until sunk on 29 November 1943
