= Melonie Gillett =

Belizean singer and songwriter (born 1984)

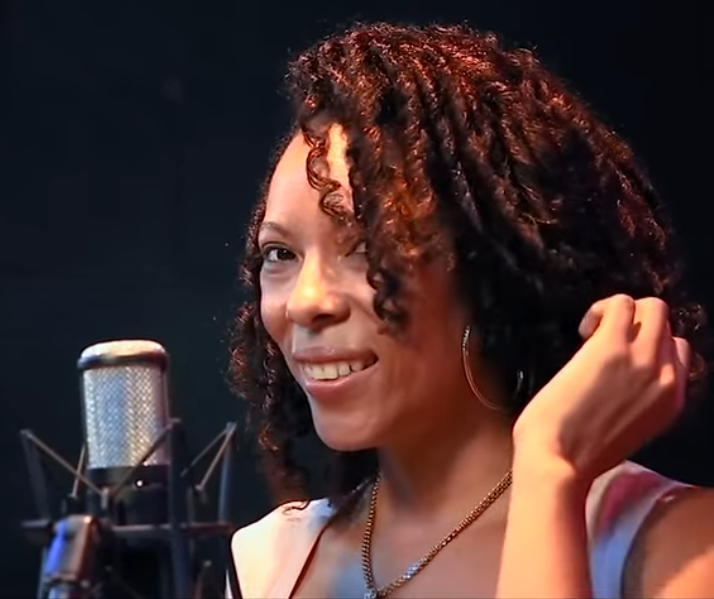
- Performing in 2021

Background information
- Born: August 23, 1984 (age 41)
- Origin: Belize City, Belize
- Genres: R&B/ Pop/ Reggae
- Occupations: Singer, Songwriter
- Years active: 2005–present

Melonie Gillett (born August 23, 1984) is a Belizean singer and songwriter. She has released an EP album entitled Rush and an album, The Dreamer.

== Early life ==
While she was born and attended high school in Belize City, Gillett was raised in Burrell Boom. She also attended Community College in the city, where she became a Certified Network Engineer. Upon returning to her home village, Melonie began to experiment with music, entering competitions and ultimately recording music. She has said her biggest influences and motivation has been her family. Some of her biggest influences outside of her family include Whitney Houston, Mariah Carey, Celine Dion, Bob Marley, Abba, Karen Carpenter, and Lauryn Hill.

== Career ==
Melonie's performance of Whitney Houston's "I Will Always Love You" on Karaoke Television in 2005, and again in 2007, brought her popularity in Belize. The release of her first single "Rush" brought he to the forefront of Belizean music. Performing with the likes of international Reggae artists such as Munga Honorable, Duane Stephenson, Pressure, Konshens, and Etana, helped to further establish Melonie as one of the premier artists in Belize.

=== Albums ===
Year	Information			
Year	Information	US	US (DD)	CA (WA)
2008	Rush: Extended Play Album; Date of release : 2008	-	-	-
2011	The Dreamer: First Studio Album; Date of release : 2011	-	-	-

DD = Digital downloads
