= Frederick Gillett =

Frederick or Fred Gillett may refer to:

- Frederick H. Gillett (1851–1935), American politician
- Fred Gillett (astronomer) (1937–2001), American astronomer
