= François Gillet =

French photographer based in Stockholm (born 1949)

- Born: 1949 (age 76–77)
- Occupation: Photographer

François Gillet (France, 1949) is a French photographer based in Stockholm, best known for his still life and child images. He studied photography at the Arts University College at Bournemouth and graduated 1971. Published in international magazines, he has been commissioned by clients all over the world for advertising campaigns such as Fuji (Japan), Silk-Cut (London), Korean airlines, Brown Brothers wineries (Australia), Bonne Maman (France), Orrefors (Sweden). He is also the author of monumental geoglyphs, mosaïcs shot in the Australian Bush, exhibited at the Foto Mässan trade show in Stockholm.

== Exhibitions ==
- FotoMässan Stockholm 2008 "Le Pays du Rêve "
- FotoMässan Stockholm 2007 ”Cubisteries”
- FotoMässan Stockholm 2006 ”Suite Automnale”
- Bièvres: Musée Francais de la Photographie, 1996
- Malmö: Exponera Warehouse Photo gallery, 1996
- Stockholm: World Trade Centre, 1993
- Sweden: Frövifors pappersbruk, 1993
- Paris: « Nudes » Salon de la Photo, 1993
- Milano: Gallery Il Milione, 1986
- Tokyo: Photopia, 1983

=== Group exhibitions ===
- Bournemouth: "From here to there" 2009 The Arts Institute
- Arles: « La photographie publicitaire en France » 2006 Musée de l´Arles
- Paris: « La photographie publicitaire en France » De Man Ray à Jean Paul Goude, 2006 Les Arts Décoratifs
- Camera Obscura Stockholm-“ Lust” 1984

== Awards ==
- Top Job Award 1998 photokina, Köln
- Folio Award Australia 1993 Excellence in Magazine Advertising
- London International Advertising Award 1994
- Lions, Cannes 1993 (Silk-Cut) Gold Lion
- Press Advertising Award, England 1993
- Platina Ägget 1990 ABCD Award, Sweden
- D&AD England 1990
- Campaign Poster Advertising Award England 1983–1993
- Australian Writers & Directors 1988–1989–1990
- Eurobest 1989
- Guld Ägget 1982 ABCD Award, Sweden
- Kodak Fotokalendar Preis, Germany 1988
- The Art Directors Club Merit Award 1988
- The Art Directors Club 59th Annual Exhibition USA Merit Award 1980
- Clio Award 1979

== Books ==
- Sekund, Mikael; Gillet, François (1994). Seize the Light!: A Chronicle of Orrefors Glass. Orrefors. OCLC 186689781.
- Gillet, François; Ustinov, Peter; Gehler, Jochen; Kampf, Hilmar (1991). Pour gourmets. Ceres-Verl. OCLC 75277320.
- Gillet, François; Palazzoli, Daniela (1986). Cubisteries. Electa-Mondadori. OCLC 220518505.
- Le Petit Théatre. Publicness. 1982.
- Le Petit Théatre- Japanese edition, 1982
- L'album de François Gillet. Zoom-Paris/Landmark Book Co. 1981. ISBN 2-903822-00-X.
