= Gillette (disambiguation) =

Gillette is an American brand of safety razors and other personal care products.

Gillette may also refer to:

== Places in the United States ==
- Gillette, New Jersey, an unincorporated community
- Gillette, Wyoming, a city
- Gillette, Florida, an unincorporated community
- Gillette Historic District, a residential historic district and neighborhood in Tulsa, Oklahoma

== People ==
- Gillette (surname)
- Gillette (singer), American singer and rapper Sandra Gillette (born 1974)
- Gillette (wrestler), a ring name of Japanese professional wrestler Yohei Fujita

== Other uses ==
- Gillette Stadium, a stadium in Foxborough, Massachusetts, United States
- Gillette station, a railway station in Long Hill Township, New Jersey, United States
- Gillette Children's Specialty Healthcare, a hospital in St. Paul, Minnesota, United States
- USS Gillette, two United States Navy destroyer escorts
- Lieutenant Gillette (Pirates of the Caribbean), a recurring character in the Pirates of the Caribbean film series
- Gillette, a nonstandard unit of measurement for the penetration ability of a laser

== See also ==
- Gilette, a commune in the Alpes-Maritimes department of France
- Gillett (disambiguation)
- Penn Jillette
