= German submarine U-843 =

German World War II submarine

History

Nazi Germany
- Name: U-843
- Ordered: 20 January 1941
- Builder: DeSchiMAG AG Weser, Bremen
- Yard number: 1049
- Laid down: 21 April 1942
- Launched: 15 December 1942
- Commissioned: 24 March 1943
- Fate: Sunk on 9 April 1945

General characteristics
- Class & type: Type IXC/40 submarine
- Displacement: 1,144 t (1,126 long tons) surfaced; 1,257 t (1,237 long tons) submerged
- Length: 76.76 m (251 ft 10 in) o/a; 58.75 m (192 ft 9 in) pressure hull
- Beam: 6.86 m (22 ft 6 in) o/a; 4.44 m (14 ft 7 in) pressure hull
- Height: 9.60 m (31 ft 6 in)
- Draught: 4.67 m (15 ft 4 in)
- Installed power: 4,400 PS (3,200 kW; 4,300 bhp) (diesels); 1,000 PS (740 kW; 990 shp) (electric)
- Propulsion: 2 shafts; 2 × diesel engines; 2 × electric motors
- Speed: 18.3 knots (33.9 km/h; 21.1 mph) surfaced; 7.3 knots (13.5 km/h; 8.4 mph) submerged
- Range: 13,850 nmi (25,650 km; 15,940 mi) at 10 knots (19 km/h; 12 mph) surfaced; 63 nmi (117 km; 72 mi) at 4 knots (7.4 km/h; 4.6 mph) submerged
- Test depth: 230 m (750 ft)
- Complement: 4 officers, 44 enlisted
- Armament: 6 × torpedo tubes (4 bow, 2 stern); 22 × 53.3 cm (21 in) torpedoes; 1 × 10.5 cm (4.1 in) SK C/32 deck gun (180 rounds); 1 × 3.7 cm (1.5 in) SK C/30 AA gun; 1 × 2 cm FlaK 30 AA guns

Service record
- Part of: 4th U-boat Flotilla; 24 March – 31 October 1943; 2nd U-boat Flotilla; 1 November 1943 – 30 September 1944; 33rd U-boat Flotilla; 1 October 1944 – 9 April 1945
- Identification codes: M 51 370
- Commanders: Kptlt. Oskar Herwartz; 24 March 1943 – 9 April 1945
- Operations: 3 patrols: 1st patrol: 15 October – 15 December 1943; 2nd patrol: a. 19 February – 11 June 1944; b. 13 – 15 June 1944; c. 1 November 1944; 3rd patrol: a. 10 December 1944 – 3 April 1945; b. 6 – 9 April 1945
- Victories: 1 merchant ship sunk (8,261 GRT)

German submarine U-843 was a Type IXC/40 U-boat of the German Kriegsmarine during World War II. The submarine was laid down on 21 April 1942 at the DeSchiMAG AG Weser yard in Bremen, launched on 15 December 1942, and commissioned on 24 March 1943 under the command of Kapitänleutnant Oskar Herwartz. After training with 4th U-boat Flotilla in the Baltic Sea, U-843 was transferred to 2nd U-boat Flotilla on 1 November 1943 for front-line service, and was transferred to 33rd U-boat Flotilla on 1 October 1944. She carried out three war patrols, sinking one ship, and was sunk by a British aircraft on 9 April 1945.

== Design ==
German Type IXC/40 submarines were slightly larger than the original Type IXCs. U-843 had a displacement of 1,144 tonnes (1,126 long tons) when at the surface and 1,257 tonnes (1,237 long tons) while submerged. The U-boat had a total length of 76.76 m (251 ft 10 in), a pressure hull length of 58.75 m (192 ft 9 in), a beam of 6.86 m (22 ft 6 in), a height of 9.60 m (31 ft 6 in), and a draught of 4.67 m (15 ft 4 in). The submarine was powered by two MAN M 9 V 40/46 supercharged four-stroke, nine-cylinder diesel engines producing a total of 4,400 metric horsepower (3,240 kW; 4,340 shp) for use while surfaced, two Siemens-Schuckert 2 GU 345/34 double-acting electric motors producing a total of 1,000 shaft horsepower (1,010 PS; 750 kW) for use while submerged. She had two shafts and two 1.92 m (6 ft) propellers. The boat was capable of operating at depths of up to 230 metres (750 ft).

The submarine had a maximum surface speed of 18.3 knots (33.9 km/h; 21.1 mph) and a maximum submerged speed of 7.3 knots (13.5 km/h; 8.4 mph). When submerged, the boat could operate for 63 nautical miles (117 km; 72 mi) at 4 knots (7.4 km/h; 4.6 mph); when surfaced, she could travel 13,850 nautical miles (25,650 km; 15,940 mi) at 10 knots (19 km/h; 12 mph). U-843 was fitted with six 53.3 cm (21 in) torpedo tubes (four fitted at the bow and two at the stern), 22 torpedoes, one 10.5 cm (4.13 in) SK C/32 naval gun, 180 rounds, and a 3.7 cm (1.5 in) SK C/30 as well as a 2 cm (0.79 in) C/30 anti-aircraft gun. The boat had a complement of forty-eight.

== Service history ==
=== First patrol ===
U-843 first sailed from Kiel on 7 October 1943, arriving at Trondheim, Norway, on the 12th. She commenced her first war patrol on 15 October, and headed out into the northern Atlantic. However, she had no successes, and finally arrived at Lorient, France, on 15 December after a voyage lasting 62 days.

=== Second patrol ===
The U-boat left Lorient on 19 February 1944, bound for the Indian Ocean. En route, on 8 April, she torpedoed and sank the unescorted 8,261 GRT British merchant ship Nebraska, dispersed from Convoy OS-71, south-west of Ascension Island. Two crew members were lost, while the master, 55 crewmen, eight gunners, and two stowaways were rescued. Oskar Herwarts surfaced U-843 and offered assistance to the three lifeboats launched from the Nebraska. This included charts torn from a chart atlas and gave position and course to steer to Brazil. Two lifeboats made landfall close to Recife months later. A third lifeboat was rescued by a British warship after several weeks.

An American B-24 bomber of US Navy Squadron VB-107 attacked the U-boat on 10 April, damaging its stern torpedo tubes. The U-boat abandoned its planned operations off Cape Town and continued into the Indian Ocean. U-843 arrived at the Japanese-controlled port of Batavia, Dutch East Indies, on 11 June after 114 days at sea. The U-boat then sailed to Singapore on 13–15 June, remaining there until 1 November, before returning to Batavia.

=== Third patrol ===
U-843 departed Batavia on 10 December 1944 with a cargo of zinc (according to a letter from Oskar Herwartz this cargo was not zinc but Wolfram). On the night of 17 December, they were refueled by U-181. They then sailed back across the Indian Ocean, around the Cape, and up through the Atlantic, arriving back in Bergen, Norway, on 3 April 1945.

=== Fate ===
Leaving Bergen on 6 April 1945, U-843 was sunk on 9 April, in the Kattegat, west of Gothenburg, in position 57°32′N 11°23′E, by rockets from a British Mosquito fighter-bomber of No. 235 Squadron RAF. Of the U-boat's crew of 56, only 12 survived.

In 1958 the wreck was raised and transported to Moss in Norway, where it was scavenged due to its valuable contents such as tungsten in the keel, natural rubber and one metric ton of opium. The wreckage was then broken up at Gothenburg.

=== Wolfpacks ===
U-843 took part in five wolfpacks during its first patrol:

- Körner (30 October – 2 November 1943)
- Tirpitz 1 (2 – 8 November 1943)
- Eisenhart 2 (9 – 15 November 1943)
- Schill 3 (18 – 22 November 1943)
- Weddigen (22 November – 7 December 1943)

== Summary of raiding history ==
| Date | Ship Name | Nationality | Tonnage (GRT) | Fate |
|---|---|---|---|---|
| 8 April 1944 | Nebraska | United Kingdom | 8,261 | Sunk |

== Bibliography ==
- Busch, Rainer; Röll, Hans-Joachim (1999). German U-boat commanders of World War II : a biographical dictionary. Translated by Brooks, Geoffrey. London, Annapolis, Md: Greenhill Books, Naval Institute Press. ISBN 1-55750-186-6.
- Busch, Rainer; Röll, Hans-Joachim (1999). Der U-Boot-Krieg, 1939-1945: Deutsche U-Boot-Verluste von September 1939 bis Mai 1945 [German U-boat losses from September 1939 to May 1945] (in German). Vol. IV. Hamburg, Berlin, Bonn: Mittler. ISBN 3-8132-0514-2.
- Gröner, Eric; Jung, Dieter; Maass, Martin (1991). German Warships 1815-1945: U-boats and Mine Warfare Vessels. Vol. 2. Translated by Thomas, Keith; Magowan, Rachel. London: Conway Maritime Press. ISBN 0-85177-593-4.
- Bishop, Chris (2006). Kriegsmarine U-Boats 1939–45. London: Amber Books. ISBN 978-1-904687-96-2.
