= Marnie Gillett =

American gallerist

- Born: Marian Newell Gillett; August 13,1953; Montclair, New Jersey
- Died: December 3, 2004; San Francisco, California
- Occupation(s): Gallerist, arts administrator

Marian Newell "Marnie" Gillett (August 13, 1953 – December 3, 2004) was an American gallerist and arts administrator. She was executive director of SF Camerawork for 20 years.

== Early life and education ==
Marian Newell Gillett was born in Glen Ridge, NJ, raised in Scarsdale, NY and the daughter of Ezra Kendall Gillett Jr. and Jean Newell McGraw Gillett (later Brookfield). She attended the Emma Willard School before she earned a BFA from the University of New Mexico and an MFA in photography from the University of Arizona.

== Career ==
Gillett was an archivist at Aperture magazine after college. She was a curator and archivist at the University of Arizona's Center for Creative Photography as a young woman. While there, she worked on the Edward Weston collection and co-curated Reasoned Space, an exhibition that toured the United States. She also worked at the Light Gallery in New York City and taught about photography at Columbia College Chicago.

Gillett was executive director of the SF Camerawork from 1984 to 2004, navigating the nonprofit arts organization through significant growth, controversy, and two moves. She edited the SF Camerawork's journal and exhibition catalogs and developed an education program. Her position gave her prominence in some important developments of the time, including the controversy over NEA funding for photographers, including Robert Mapplethorpe, and the technological effects of video, digital processes, and the internet on photography.

== Personal life ==
She died at her San Francisco home from breast cancer in 2004, at the age of 51, survived by her partner, Clare Wren.
