= HMS Foley (K474) =

Frigate of the Royal Navy

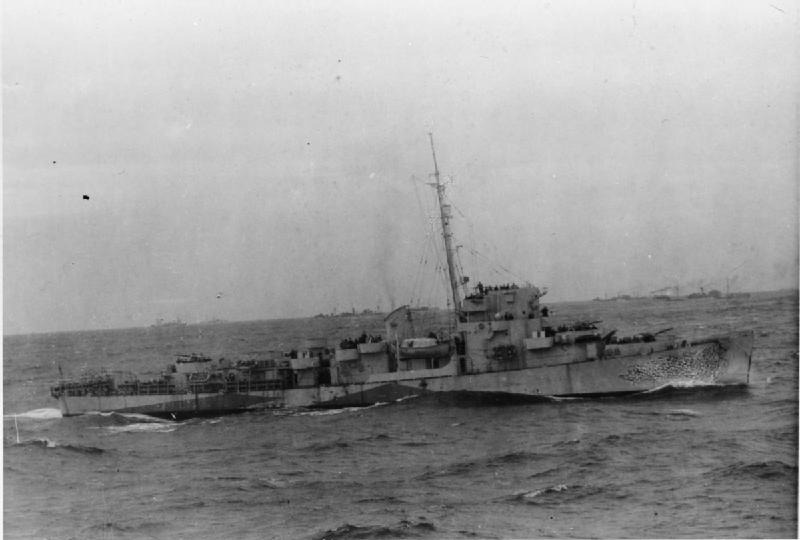
- HMS Foley during World War II.

History

United States
- Name: USS Gillette (DE-270)
- Namesake: U.S. Navy Lieutenant, junior grade Douglas Wiley Gillette (1918-1942), killed in action aboard the aircraft carrier USS Hornet (CV-8) in the Battle of the Santa Cruz Islands in 1942
- Ordered: 25 January 1942
- Builder: Boston Navy Yard, Boston, Massachusetts
- Laid down: 7 April 1943
- Launched: 19 May 1943
- Sponsored by: Mrs. Thomas O'Dea
- Completed: 8 September 1943
- Fate: Transferred to United Kingdom 8 September 1943
- Acquired: Returned by United Kingdom 22 August 1945
- Name: USS Foley (DE-270)
- Commissioned: 22 August 1945
- Decommissioned: 19 October 1945
- Stricken: 1 November 1945
- Fate: Sold 19 June 1946 for scrapping

United Kingdom
- Name: HMS Foley (K474)
- Namesake: Admiral Sir Thomas Foley (1757-1833), British naval officer
- Acquired: 8 September 1943
- Commissioned: 8 September 1943
- Fate: Returned to United States 22 August 1945

General characteristics
- Displacement: 1,140 long tons (1,158 t)
- Length: 289.5 ft (88.2 m)
- Beam: 35 ft (11 m)
- Draught: 9 ft (2.7 m)
- Propulsion: Four General Motors 278A 16-cylinder engines; GE 7,040 bhp (5,250 kW) generators (4,800 kW); GE electric motors for 6,000 shp (4,500 kW); Two shafts
- Speed: 20 knots (37 km/h)
- Range: 5,000 nautical miles (9,260 km) at 15 knots (28 km/h)
- Complement: 156
- Sensors & processing systems: SA & SL type radars; Type 144 series Asdic; MF Direction Finding antenna; HF Direction Finding Type FH 4 antenna
- Armament: 3 × 3 in (76 mm) /50 Mk.22 guns; 1 × twin Bofors 40 mm mount Mk.I; 7–16 × 20 mm Oerlikon guns; Mark 10 Hedgehog antisubmarine mortar; Depth charges; QF 2-pounder naval gun

The second HMS Foley (K474) was a British Captain-class frigate of the Royal Navy in commission during World War II. Originally constructed as the United States Navy Evarts-class destroyer escort USS Gillette (DE-270), she served in the Royal Navy from 1943 to 1945 and in the U.S. Navy as USS Foley (DE-270) from August to October 1945.

== Construction and transfer ==
The ship was ordered as the U.S. Navy destroyer escort DE-270 on 25 January 1942 and assigned the name USS Gillette, the first ship of the name, on 23 February 1943. She was laid down by the Boston Navy Yard in Boston, Massachusetts, on 7 April 1943 and launched on 19 May 1943, sponsored by Mrs. Thomas O'Dea. The United States transferred the ship to the United Kingdom under Lend-Lease upon completion on 8 September 1943.

== Service history ==
=== Royal Navy, 1943-1945 ===
Commissioned into service in the Royal Navy as HMS Foley (K474) on 8 September 1943 simultaneously with her transfer, the ship served on patrol and escort duty. On 21 November 1943 she joined the British sloop HMS Crane (U23) in a depth-charge attack that sank the German submarine U-538 in the North Atlantic Ocean southwest of Ireland at position 45°40′00″N 019°35′00″W.

The Royal Navy returned Foley to the U.S. Navy at Harwich, England, on 22 August 1945.

=== U.S. Navy, 1945 ===
The ship was commissioned into the U.S. Navy as USS Foley (DE-270) on 22 August 1945 simultaneously with her return . She moved to Trinity Bay on 28 August 1945, and on 29 August 1945 departed Trinity Bay as a part of Task Group 21.3. She crossed the Atlantic Ocean, called briefly at Naval Station Argentia in the Dominion of Newfoundland, and arrived at the Philadelphia Naval Shipyard in Philadelphia, Pennsylvania, on 10 September 1945. She remained there until decommissioned on 19 October 1945.

== Disposal ==
The U.S. Navy struck Foley from its Naval Vessel Register on 1 November 1945. She was sold on 19 June 1946 for scrapping.
