= German submarine U-600 =

German World War II submarine

History

Nazi Germany
- Name: U-600
- Ordered: 22 May 1940
- Builder: Blohm & Voss, Hamburg
- Yard number: 576
- Laid down: 25 January 1941
- Launched: 16 October 1941
- Commissioned: 11 December 1941
- Fate: Sunk on 25 November 1943

General characteristics
- Class & type: Type VIIC submarine
- Displacement: 769 tonnes (757 long tons) surfaced; 871 t (857 long tons) submerged
- Length: 67.10 m (220 ft 2 in) o/a; 50.50 m (165 ft 8 in) pressure hull
- Beam: 6.20 m (20 ft 4 in) o/a; 4.70 m (15 ft 5 in) pressure hull
- Height: 9.60 m (31 ft 6 in)
- Draught: 4.74 m (15 ft 7 in)
- Installed power: 2,800–3,200 PS (2,100–2,400 kW; 2,800–3,200 bhp) (diesels); 750 PS (550 kW; 740 shp) (electric)
- Propulsion: 2 shafts; 2 × diesel engines; 2 × electric motors
- Speed: 17.7 knots (32.8 km/h; 20.4 mph) surfaced; 7.6 knots (14.1 km/h; 8.7 mph) submerged
- Range: 8,500 nmi (15,700 km; 9,800 mi) at 10 knots (19 km/h; 12 mph) surfaced; 80 nmi (150 km; 92 mi) at 4 knots (7.4 km/h; 4.6 mph) submerged
- Test depth: 230 m (750 ft); Crush depth: 250–295 m (820–968 ft)
- Complement: 4 officers, 40–56 enlisted
- Armament: 5 × 53.3 cm (21 in) torpedo tubes (four bow, one stern); 14 × torpedoes or 26 TMA mines; 1 × 8.8 cm (3.46 in) deck gun (220 rounds); 1 x 2 cm (0.79 in) C/30 AA gun

Service record
- Part of: 5th U-boat Flotilla; 11 December 1941 – 31 July 1942; 3rd U-boat Flotilla; 1 August 1942 – 25 November 1943
- Identification codes: M 47 389
- Commanders: Kptlt. / K.Kapt. Bernhard Zurmühlen; 11 December 1941 – 25 November 1943
- Operations: 6 patrols: 1st patrol: 14 July – 22 September 1942; 2nd patrol: 22 November – 27 December 1942; 3rd patrol: 11 February – 26 March 1943; 4th patrol: 25 April – 11 May 1943; 5th patrol: 12 June – 10 September 1943; 6th patrol: 7 – 25 November 1943
- Victories: 5 merchant ships sunk (28,600 GRT); 3 merchant ships damaged (19,230 GRT)

German submarine U-600 was a Type VIIC U-boat built for Nazi Germany's Kriegsmarine for service during World War II. She was laid down on 25 January 1941 by Blohm & Voss in Hamburg as yard number 576, launched on 16 October 1941 and commissioned on 11 December 1941 under Kapitänleutnant Bernhard Zurmühlen.

== Design ==
German Type VIIC submarines were preceded by the shorter Type VIIB submarines. U-600 had a displacement of 769 tonnes (757 long tons) when at the surface and 871 tonnes (857 long tons) while submerged. She had a total length of 67.10 m (220 ft 2 in), a pressure hull length of 50.50 m (165 ft 8 in), a beam of 6.20 m (20 ft 4 in), a height of 9.60 m (31 ft 6 in), and a draught of 4.74 m (15 ft 7 in). The submarine was powered by two Germaniawerft F46 four-stroke, six-cylinder supercharged diesel engines producing a total of 2,800 to 3,200 metric horsepower (2,060 to 2,350 kW; 2,760 to 3,160 shp) for use while surfaced, two Brown, Boveri & Cie GG UB 720/8 double-acting electric motors producing a total of 750 metric horsepower (550 kW; 740 shp) for use while submerged. She had two shafts and two 1.23 m (4 ft) propellers. The boat was capable of operating at depths of up to 230 metres (750 ft).

The submarine had a maximum surface speed of 17.7 knots (32.8 km/h; 20.4 mph) and a maximum submerged speed of 7.6 knots (14.1 km/h; 8.7 mph). When submerged, the boat could operate for 80 nautical miles (150 km; 92 mi) at 4 knots (7.4 km/h; 4.6 mph); when surfaced, she could travel 8,500 nautical miles (15,700 km; 9,800 mi) at 10 knots (19 km/h; 12 mph). U-600 was fitted with five 53.3 cm (21 in) torpedo tubes (four fitted at the bow and one at the stern), fourteen torpedoes, one 8.8 cm (3.46 in) SK C/35 naval gun, 220 rounds, and a 2 cm (0.79 in) C/30 anti-aircraft gun. The boat had a complement of between forty-four and sixty.

== Service history ==
The boat's service began on 11 December 1941 with training as part of the 5th U-boat Flotilla. She was transferred to the 3rd Flotilla, operating out of La Pallice, France, on 1 August 1942 for active service in the North Atlantic.

In six patrols she sank five merchant ships, for a total of 28,600 GRT, plus three merchant ships damaged.

=== Wolfpacks ===
U-600 took part in eight wolfpacks, namely:

- Draufgänger (29 November – 11 December 1942)
- Raufbold (11 – 22 December 1942)
- Knappen (19 – 25 February 1943)
- Burggraf (4 – 5 March 1943)
- Raubgraf (7 – 20 March 1943)
- Drossel (29 April – 5 May 1943)
- Schill 1 (16 – 22 November 1943)
- Weddigen (22 – 25 November 1943)

=== Fate ===
U-600 was sunk on 25 November 1943 in the North Atlantic in position 40°31′N 22°07′W, by depth charges from Royal Navy frigates HMS Bazely and HMS Blackwood. All 45 hands were lost.

== Summary of raiding history ==
Date	Ship Name	Nationality	Tonnage (GRT)	Fate
10 August 1942	Vivian P. Smith	United Kingdom	130	Sunk
13 August 1942	Delmundo	United States	5,032	Sunk
13 August 1942	Everelza	Latvia	4,520	Sunk
8 December 1942	James McKay	United States	6,762	Sunk
24 February 1943	Ingria	Norway	4,391	Damaged
17 March 1943	Irénée Du Pont	United States	6,125	Damaged
17 March 1943	Nariva	United Kingdom	8,714	Damaged
17 March 1943	Southern Princess	United Kingdom	12,156	Sunk

== Bibliography ==
- Busch, Rainer; Röll, Hans-Joachim (1999). German U-boat commanders of World War II : a biographical dictionary. Translated by Brooks, Geoffrey. London, Annapolis, Md: Greenhill Books, Naval Institute Press. ISBN 1-55750-186-6.
- Busch, Rainer; Röll, Hans-Joachim (1999). Der U-Boot-Krieg, 1939-1945: Deutsche U-Boot-Verluste von September 1939 bis Mai 1945 [German U-boat losses from September 1939 to May 1945] (in German). Vol. IV. Hamburg, Berlin, Bonn: Mittler. ISBN 3-8132-0514-2.
- Edwards, Bernard (1996). Dönitz and the Wolf Packs - The U-boats at War. Cassell. p. 161. ISBN 0-304-35203-9.
- Gröner, Eric; Jung, Dieter; Maass, Martin (1991). German Warships 1815-1945: U-boats and Mine Warfare Vessels. Vol. 2. Translated by Thomas, Keith; Magowan, Rachel. London: Conway Maritime Press. ISBN 0-85177-593-4.
- Sharpe, Peter (1998). U-Boat Fact File. Great Britain: Midland Publishing. ISBN 1-85780-072-9.
