= Alan Gillett =

Alan Gillett may refer to:

- Alan Gillett (football) (born 1948), football coach
- Alan Gillett (surveyor) (born 1930), chartered surveyor and civic dignitary
