= German submarine U-424 =

German type VII C world war II submarine

History

Nazi Germany
- Name: U-424
- Ordered: 10 April 1941
- Builder: Danziger Werft, Danzig
- Yard number: 125
- Laid down: 16 April 1942
- Launched: 28 November 1942
- Commissioned: 7 April 1943
- Fate: Sunk on 11 February 1944

General characteristics
- Class & type: Type VIIC submarine
- Displacement: 769 tonnes (757 long tons) surfaced; 871 t (857 long tons) submerged
- Length: 67.10 m (220 ft 2 in) o/a; 50.50 m (165 ft 8 in) pressure hull
- Beam: 6.20 m (20 ft 4 in) o/a; 4.70 m (15 ft 5 in) pressure hull
- Height: 9.60 m (31 ft 6 in)
- Draught: 4.74 m (15 ft 7 in)
- Installed power: 2,800–3,200 PS (2,100–2,400 kW; 2,800–3,200 bhp) (diesels); 750 PS (550 kW; 740 shp) (electric)
- Propulsion: 2 shafts; 2 × diesel engines; 2 × electric motors.
- Speed: 17.7 knots (32.8 km/h; 20.4 mph) surfaced; 7.6 knots (14.1 km/h; 8.7 mph) submerged
- Range: 8,500 nmi (15,700 km; 9,800 mi) at 10 knots (19 km/h; 12 mph) surfaced; 80 nmi (150 km; 92 mi) at 4 knots (7.4 km/h; 4.6 mph) submerged
- Test depth: 230 m (750 ft); Crush depth: 250–295 m (820–968 ft)
- Complement: 4 officers, 40–56 enlisted
- Armament: 5 × 53.3 cm (21 in) torpedo tubes (four bow, one stern); 14 × torpedoes; 1 × 8.8 cm (3.46 in) deck gun (220 rounds); 2 × twin 2 cm (0.79 in) C/30 anti-aircraft guns

Service record
- Part of: 8th U-boat Flotilla; 7 April – 30 September 1943; 1st U-boat Flotilla; 1 October – 11 February 1944
- Identification codes: M 51 006
- Commanders: Oblt.z.S. Günter Lüders; 7 April 1943 – 11 February 1944
- Operations: 2 patrols: 1st patrol: 22 October – 15 December 1943; 2nd patrol: 29 January – 11 February 1944
- Victories: None

German submarine U-424 was a Type VIIC U-boat of Nazi Germany's Kriegsmarine during World War II.

She carried out two patrols. She was a member of four wolfpacks. She did not sink or damage any ships.

She was sunk by British warships southwest of Ireland on 11 February 1944.

== Design ==
German Type VIIC submarines were preceded by the shorter Type VIIB submarines. U-424 had a displacement of 769 tonnes (757 long tons) when at the surface and 871 tonnes (857 long tons) while submerged. She had a total length of 67.10 m (220 ft 2 in), a pressure hull length of 50.50 m (165 ft 8 in), a beam of 6.20 m (20 ft 4 in), a height of 9.60 m (31 ft 6 in), and a draught of 4.74 m (15 ft 7 in). The submarine was powered by two Germaniawerft F46 four-stroke, six-cylinder supercharged diesel engines producing a total of 2,800 to 3,200 metric horsepower (2,060 to 2,350 kW; 2,760 to 3,160 shp) for use while surfaced, two Siemens-Schuckert GU 343/38–8 double-acting electric motors producing a total of 750 metric horsepower (550 kW; 740 shp) for use while submerged. She had two shafts and two 1.23 m (4 ft) propellers. The boat was capable of operating at depths of up to 230 metres (750 ft).

The submarine had a maximum surface speed of 17.7 knots (32.8 km/h; 20.4 mph) and a maximum submerged speed of 7.6 knots (14.1 km/h; 8.7 mph). When submerged, the boat could operate for 80 nautical miles (150 km; 92 mi) at 4 knots (7.4 km/h; 4.6 mph); when surfaced, she could travel 8,500 nautical miles (15,700 km; 9,800 mi) at 10 knots (19 km/h; 12 mph). U-424 was fitted with five 53.3 cm (21 in) torpedo tubes (four fitted at the bow and one at the stern), fourteen torpedoes, one 8.8 cm (3.46 in) SK C/35 naval gun, 220 rounds, and two twin 2 cm (0.79 in) C/30 anti-aircraft guns. The boat had a complement of between forty-four and sixty.

== Service history ==
The submarine was laid down on 16 April 1942 at the Danziger Werft (yard) at Danzig (now Gdansk), as yard number 125, launched on 28 November and commissioned on 7 April 1943 under the command of Oberleutnant zur See Günter Lüders.

She served with the 8th U-boat Flotilla from 7 April 1942 and the 1st flotilla from 1 October 1943.

=== Patrols and loss ===
The boat's first patrol was preceded by a trip from Kiel in Germany to Trondheim in Norway. U-424 then left Trondheim on 22 October 1943 and headed for the Atlantic Ocean via the gap between Iceland and the Faroe Islands, arriving in Brest in occupied France on 15 December.

Her second sortie began on 29 January 1944. On 11 February, she was attacked and sunk by depth charges dropped by the British sloops HMS Wild Goose and HMS Woodpecker.

Fifty men went down with the U-boat; there were no survivors.

=== Wolfpacks ===
U-424 took part in four wolfpacks, namely:

- Eisenhart 2 (9 – 15 November 1943)
- Schill 3 (18 – 22 November 1943)
- Weddigen (22 November – 7 December 1943)
- Igel 2 (3 – 11 February 1944)

== Bibliography ==
- Busch, Rainer; Röll, Hans-Joachim (1999). German U-boat commanders of World War II : a biographical dictionary. Translated by Brooks, Geoffrey. London, Annapolis, Md: Greenhill Books, Naval Institute Press. ISBN 1-55750-186-6.
- Busch, Rainer; Röll, Hans-Joachim (1999). Deutsche U-Boot-Verluste von September 1939 bis Mai 1945 [German U-boat losses from September 1939 to May 1945]. Der U-Boot-Krieg (in German). Vol. IV. Hamburg, Berlin, Bonn: Mittler. ISBN 3-8132-0514-2.
- Gröner, Erich; Jung, Dieter; Maass, Martin (1991). U-boats and Mine Warfare Vessels. German Warships 1815–1945. Vol. 2. Translated by Thomas, Keith; Magowan, Rachel. London: Conway Maritime Press. ISBN 0-85177-593-4.
- Kemp, Paul (1999). U-Boats Destroyed – German Submarine Losses in the World Wars. London: Arms & Armour. ISBN 1-85409-515-3.
