= Hugh Gillett =

English cricketer and clergyman

Personal information
- Full name: Hugh Hodgson Gillett
- Born: 19 June 1836; Waltham on the Wolds, Leicestershire, England
- Died: 22 January 1915 (aged 78); Thornbury, Gloucestershire, England
- Batting: Right-handed
- Bowling: Right-arm roundarm medium
- Relatives: Charles Gillett (son)

Domestic team information
- Years: Team
- 1857–1858: Oxford University
- 1868: Marylebone Cricket Club

Career statistics
Competition	First-class
Matches	6
Runs scored	117
Batting average	16.71
100s/50s	–/1
Top score	53
Balls bowled	513
Wickets	17
Bowling average	12.05
5 wickets in innings	2
10 wickets in match	–
Best bowling	6/22
Catches/stumpings	3/–
- Source: Cricinfo, 11 May 2020

Hugh Hodgson Gillett (19 June 1836 – 22 January 1915) was an English first-class cricketer and clergyman.

The son of Gabriel Edward Gillett, he was born in June 1836 at Waltham on the Wolds, Leicestershire. He was educated at Winchester College, before going up to Exeter College, Oxford in 1854. While studying at Oxford, he played first-class cricket for Oxford University, making his debut against the Marylebone Cricket Club (MCC) at Oxford in 1857. He played first-class cricket for Oxford until 1858, making a total of four appearances. Gillett took 16 wickets with his right-arm roundarm medium pace bowling, at an average of 11.93. He took two five wicket hauls, with best figures of 6 for 22.

After graduating from Oxford, Gillett took holy orders in the Church of England in 1873. His first ecclesiastical post was as curate of Wantage from 1859 to 1862, before becoming curate at Finedon, Northamptonshire from 1862 to 1865. He took on the curacy of Compton, Guildford in 1865, before becoming the curate at his place of birth from 1867 to 1871. Gillett returned to first-class cricket in 1868, making two appearances for the MCC against Oxford University and Cambridge University at Lord's, making a half century against Cambridge. He became curate at Wadenhoe, Northamptonshire from 1871 to 1877, before returning to Compton to become rector there in 1877. Gillett died in January 1915 at Thornbury, Gloucestershire. His son, Charles, also played first-class cricket.
