= Fernley Marrison =

English cricketer and British Army officer

Personal information
- Full name: Fernley Marrison
- Born: 13 October 1891; Gillingham, Kent, England
- Died: 13 February 1967 (aged 75); South Farnborough, Hampshire, England
- Batting: Right-handed
- Bowling: Right-arm fast

Domestic team information
- Years: Team
- 1925/26: Europeans

Career statistics
| Competition | First-class |
|---|---|
| Matches | 8 |
| Runs scored | 85 |
| Batting average | 10.62 |
| 100s/50s | –/– |
| Top score | 20* |
| Balls bowled | 1,098 |
| Wickets | 16 |
| Bowling average | 33.56 |
| 5 wickets in innings | 1 |
| 10 wickets in match | – |
| Best bowling | 6/44 |
| Catches/stumpings | 6/– |
- Source: ESPNcricinfo, 7 April 2019

Fernley Marrison MBE (13 October 1891 – 13 February 1967) was an English first-class cricketer and British Army officer. Marrison spent over twenty years as a non-commissioned officer in the Royal Army Service Corps, during which he served in the First World War. He was eventually commissioned in 1935 and went on to serve in the Second World War. He also played first-class cricket for the British Army cricket team and the Europeans cricket team in British India.

== Life and military career ==
Marrison was born at Gillingham. He enlisted in the Royal Army Service Corps prior to the First World War as a non-commissioned officer and later served during the conflict. In June 1914, a before the start of the conflict, Marrison made his debut in first-class cricket for the British Army cricket team against Cambridge University at Fenner's. Following the war, he resumed playing first-class cricket for the Army in 1920, during which he played in four matches. In five first-class matches for the Army, he scored 85 runs and took 6 wickets with his right-arm fast bowling, albeit at an expensive average of 60.00. He later appeared in a first-class match for H. D. G. Leveson Gower's personal XI in 1925, playing against Glamorgan at Swansea. He was the Aldershot Garrison horn champion in the same year. The following year he was posted to British India, where he played two first-class matches for the Europeans against the Sikhs and the Muslims in 1925-26 Lahore Tournament. In the match against the Sikhs, he took figures of 6 for 44 in the Sikhs second-innings to guide the Europeans to a 58 run victory.

He was made a commissioned officer in July 1935, when he was promoted to the rank of lieutenant (mechanist officer). At some point between July 1935 and September 1944, he was promoted to the rank of captain. He served in the Second World War, during which he was promoted to the rank of major in September 1944. He exceeded the age limit for service in December 1948 and was placed on the retired list. He was made an MBE in the 1949 New Year Honours.

He died at South Farnborough in February 1967.
