= George Gillett =

George Gillett may refer to:

- George A. Gillett (1877–1956), New Zealand multi-code footballer
- George N. Gillett Jr. (1938–2026), American businessman, professional sports franchise owner
- George Gillett (politician) (1870–1939), Member of Parliament for Finsbury, 1923–1935

== See also ==
- George F. Gillette, member of the California legislature
- "Gorgeous" George Gillette, English professional wrestling manager, manager of Kendo Nagasaki
