= Gillett =

Gillett may refer to:

== Places in the United States ==
- Gillett, Arizona, a ghost town and former mining settlement
- Gillett, Arkansas
- Gillett, Pennsylvania
- Gillett, Texas
- Gillett, Wisconsin
- Gillett (town), Wisconsin
- Gillett Grove, Iowa

== Other uses ==
- Gillett (surname)

== See also ==
- Penn Jillette (born 1955), American magician and writer
- Gillette (disambiguation)
