= German submarine U-714 =

German World War II submarine

Coordinates: 55°57′N 01°57′W

History

Nazi Germany
- Name: U-714
- Ordered: 7 December 1940
- Builder: HC Stülcken & Sohn, Hamburg
- Yard number: 780
- Laid down: 29 December 1941
- Launched: 13 November 1942
- Commissioned: 10 February 1943
- Fate: Sunk on 14 March 1945

General characteristics
- Class & type: Type VIIC submarine
- Displacement: 769 tonnes (757 long tons) surfaced; 871 t (857 long tons) submerged
- Length: 67.10 m (220 ft 2 in) o/a; 50.50 m (165 ft 8 in) pressure hull
- Beam: 6.20 m (20 ft 4 in) o/a; 4.70 m (15 ft 5 in) pressure hull
- Height: 9.60 m (31 ft 6 in)
- Draught: 4.74 m (15 ft 7 in)
- Installed power: 2,800–3,200 PS (2,100–2,400 kW; 2,800–3,200 bhp) (diesels); 750 PS (550 kW; 740 shp) (electric)
- Propulsion: 2 shafts; 2 × diesel engines; 2 × electric motors
- Speed: 17.7 knots (32.8 km/h; 20.4 mph) surfaced; 7.6 knots (14.1 km/h; 8.7 mph) submerged
- Range: 8,500 nmi (15,700 km; 9,800 mi) at 10 knots (19 km/h; 12 mph) surfaced; 80 nmi (150 km; 92 mi) at 4 knots (7.4 km/h; 4.6 mph) submerged
- Test depth: 230 m (750 ft); Crush depth: 250–295 m (820–968 ft)
- Complement: 4 officers, 40–56 enlisted
- Armament: 5 × 53.3 cm (21 in) torpedo tubes (four bow, one stern); 14 × torpedoes; 1 × 8.8 cm (3.46 in) deck gun (220 rounds); 2 × twin 2 cm (0.79 in) C/30 anti-aircraft guns

Service record
- Part of: 5th U-boat Flotilla; 10 February – 31 July 1943; 7th U-boat Flotilla; 1 August 1943 – 10 November 1944; 33rd U-boat Flotilla; 11 November 1944 – 14 March 1945
- Identification codes: M 50 495
- Commanders: Oblt.z.S. / Kptlt. Hans-Joachim Schwebcke; 10 February 1943 – 14 March 1945
- Operations: 6 patrols: 1st patrol: 13 October – 2 December 1943; 2nd patrol: a. 11 – 15 January 1944; b. 20 January – 25 February 1944; 3rd patrol: a. 6 – 15 June 1944; b. 21 – 25 August 1944; 4th patrol: 27 August – 20 October 1944; 5th patrol: a. 23 – 28 October 1944; b. 17 – 22 February 1945; 6th patrol: 3 – 14 March 1945
- Victories: 1 merchant ship sunk (1,226 GRT); 1 auxiliary warship sunk (425 GRT)

German submarine U-714 was a Type VIIC U-boat Nazi Germany's Kriegsmarine built for service during World War II. She was laid down on 29 December 1941 by H. C. Stülcken Sohn at Hamburg and commissioned on 10 February 1943. She was commanded throughout her career by Oberleutnant zur See Hans-Joachim Schwebcke.

== Design ==
German Type VIIC submarines were preceded by the shorter Type VIIB submarines. U-714 had a displacement of 769 tonnes (757 long tons) when at the surface and 871 tonnes (857 long tons) while submerged. She had a total length of 67.10 m (220 ft 2 in), a pressure hull length of 50.50 m (165 ft 8 in), a beam of 6.20 m (20 ft 4 in), a height of 9.60 m (31 ft 6 in), and a draught of 4.74 m (15 ft 7 in). The submarine was powered by two Germaniawerft F46 four-stroke, six-cylinder supercharged diesel engines producing a total of 2,800 to 3,200 metric horsepower (2,060 to 2,350 kW; 2,760 to 3,160 shp) for use while surfaced, two Garbe, Lahmeyer & Co. RP 137/c double-acting electric motors producing a total of 750 metric horsepower (550 kW; 740 shp) for use while submerged. She had two shafts and two 1.23 m (4 ft) propellers. The boat was capable of operating at depths of up to 230 metres (750 ft).

The submarine had a maximum surface speed of 17.7 knots (32.8 km/h; 20.4 mph) and a maximum submerged speed of 7.6 knots (14.1 km/h; 8.7 mph). When submerged, the boat could operate for 80 nautical miles (150 km; 92 mi) at 4 knots (7.4 km/h; 4.6 mph); when surfaced, she could travel 8,500 nautical miles (15,700 km; 9,800 mi) at 10 knots (19 km/h; 12 mph). U-714 was fitted with five 53.3 cm (21 in) torpedo tubes (four fitted at the bow and one at the stern), fourteen torpedoes, one 8.8 cm (3.46 in) SK C/35 naval gun, 220 rounds, and two twin 2 cm (0.79 in) C/30 anti-aircraft guns. The boat had a complement of between forty-four and sixty.

== Fate ==
She was sunk on 14 March 1945 near Eyemouth in the Firth of Forth at position by depth charges from the South African frigate HMSAS Natal. HMS Wivern was granted a share of the credit for this kill as well. She had a complement of 50 crew, and when she sank, all of her crew died. She was designated as a protected place under the Protection of Military Remains Act 1986 in 2008.

=== Wolfpacks ===
U-714 took part in six wolfpacks, namely:

- Körner (30 October – 2 November 1943)
- Tirpitz 1 (2 – 8 November 1943)
- Eisenhart 2 (9 – 15 November 1943)
- Schill 3 (18 – 22 November 1943)
- Weddigen (22 – 30 November 1943)
- Igel 1 (3 – 17 February 1944)

== Summary of raiding history ==
| Date | Ship Name | Nationality | Tonnage (Note: Merchant ship tonnages are in gross register tons. Military vessels are listed by tons displacement.) | Fate |
|---|---|---|---|---|
| 10 March 1945 | HNoMS Nordhav II | Royal Norwegian Navy | 425 | Sunk |
| 14 March 1945 | Magne | Sweden | 1,226 | Sunk |

== Bibliography ==
- Busch, Rainer; Röll, Hans-Joachim (1999). German U-boat commanders of World War II : a biographical dictionary. Translated by Brooks, Geoffrey. London, Annapolis, Md: Greenhill Books, Naval Institute Press. ISBN 1-55750-186-6.
- Busch, Rainer; Röll, Hans-Joachim (1999). Der U-Boot-Krieg, 1939-1945: Deutsche U-Boot-Verluste von September 1939 bis Mai 1945 [German U-boat losses from September 1939 to May 1945] (in German). Vol. IV. Hamburg, Berlin, Bonn: Mittler. ISBN 3-8132-0514-2.
- Gröner, Eric; Jung, Dieter; Maass, Martin (1991). German Warships 1815-1945: U-boats and Mine Warfare Vessels. Vol. 2. Translated by Thomas, Keith; Magowan, Rachel. London: Conway Maritime Press. ISBN 0-85177-593-4.
- McCartney, Innes (2002). Lost patrols : submarine wrecks of the English Channel. Penzance: Periscope. ISBN 978-1-90438-104-4.
