= HMS Blackwood (K313) =

Frigate of the Royal Navy

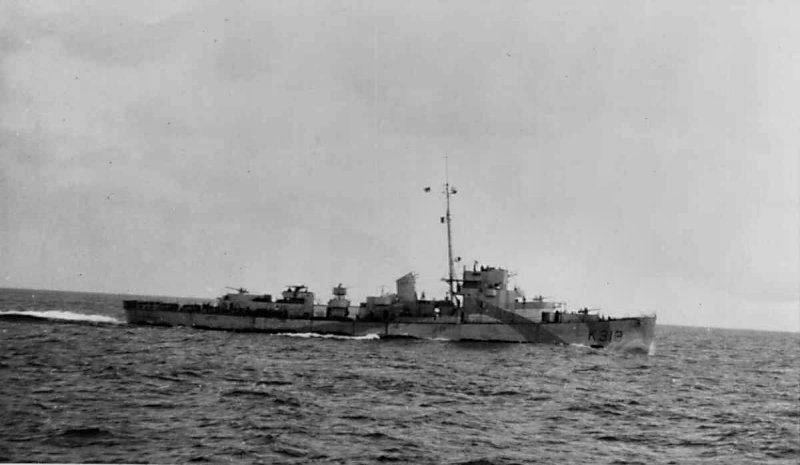
- HMS Blackwood

History

United Kingdom
- Name: HMS Blackwood
- Namesake: Henry Blackwood
- Builder: Boston Navy Yard, Massachusetts
- Laid down: 22 September 1942
- Launched: 23 November 1942
- Commissioned: 27 March 1943
- Identification: Pennant number: K313
- Fate: Sunk under tow, 16 June 1944

General characteristics
- Class & type: Captain-class frigate
- Displacement: 1,190 long tons (1,210 t) (standard)
- Length: 289 ft 5 in (88.2 m)
- Beam: 35 ft 2 in (10.7 m)
- Draught: 10 ft 1 in (3.1 m)
- Installed power: 6,000 shp (4,500 kW) electric motors
- Propulsion: 2 shafts; 4 diesel engines
- Speed: 20 knots (37 km/h; 23 mph)
- Range: 6,000 nmi (11,000 km; 6,900 mi) at 12 knots (22 km/h; 14 mph)
- Complement: 198
- Sensors & processing systems: SA & SL type radars; Type 144 series Asdic; MF Direction Finding; HF Direction Finding
- Armament: 3 × single 3 in (76 mm)/50 Mk 22 guns; 1 × twin Bofors 40 mm; 9 × single 20 mm Oerlikon guns; 1 × Hedgehog anti-submarine mortar; 2 × Depth charge rails and four throwers

HMS Blackwood was a Captain-class frigate originally constructed as a Evarts-class destroyer escort ordered for the United States Navy. Before construction was finished in 1942, the vessel was transferred to the Royal Navy under the terms of Lend-Lease, and saw service during the Second World War.

== Description ==
The Evarts-class ships had an overall length of 289 feet 5 inches (88.2 m), a beam of 35 feet 2 inches (10.7 m), and a draught of 10 feet 1 inch (3.1 m) at full load. They displaced 1,190 long tons (1,210 t) at (standard) and 1,416 long tons (1,439 t) at full load. The ships had a diesel–electric powertrain derived from a submarine propulsion system with four General Motors 16-cylinder diesel engines providing power to four General Electric electric generators which sent electricity to four 1,500-shaft-horsepower (1,100 kW) General Electric electric motors which drove the two propeller shafts. The destroyer escorts had enough power give them a speed of 20 knots (37 km/h; 23 mph) and enough fuel oil to give them a range of 6,000 nautical miles (11,000 km; 6,900 mi) at 12 knots (22 km/h; 14 mph). Their crew consisted of 198 officers and ratings.

The armament of the Evarts-class ships in British service consisted of three single mounts for 50-caliber 3-inch (76 mm)/50 Mk 22 dual-purpose guns; one superfiring pair forward of the bridge and the third gun aft of the superstructure. Anti-aircraft defence was intended to consisted of a twin-gun mount for 40-millimetre (1.6 in) Bofors anti-aircraft (AA) guns atop the rear superstructure with nine 20-millimetre (0.8 in) Oerlikon AA guns located on the superstructure, but production shortages meant that that not all guns were fitted, or that additional Oerlikons replaced the Bofors guns. A Mark 10 Hedgehog anti-submarine mortar was positioned just behind the forward gun. The ships were also equipped with two depth charge rails at the stern and four "K-gun" depth charge throwers.

== Construction and career ==
Blackwood was built by Boston Navy Yard, Massachusetts and commissioned into the Royal Navy on 27 March 1943. She saw service on anti-submarine patrols and as a convoy escort (participating in 13 convoys from 9 August 1943 to 20 February 1944). On 25 November 1943 HMS Bazely and Blackwood sank the German submarine U-600 north of Punta Delgada. Blackwood was part of the 3rd Escort Group and was on patrol in the western approaches to the English Channel on 15 June 1944, covering ships bound for the Allied invasion of Normandy when she was sighted by U-764, which fired a "Gnat" torpedo at her. Blackwood was hit and damaged, killing 58 of the 168 crew. 51 were wounded. Air Sea Rescue launches conveyed survivors to Portland. Three ratings died on the way in and were buried at Portland Royal Naval Cemetery. Blackwood was taken under tow, but foundered off Portland Bill the following day. The wreck lies in position 50°07′00″N 02°01′06″W in 60 metres (200 ft) of water.
