= Small nucleolar RNA SNORD57 =

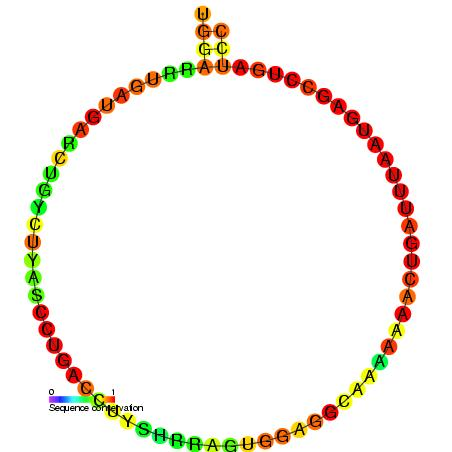
- Predicted secondary structure and sequence conservation of SNORD57

Identifiers
- Symbol: SNORD57
- Alt. Symbols: U57
- Rfam: RF00274

Other data
- RNA type: Gene; snRNA; snoRNA; CD-box
- Domain: Eukaryota
- GO: GO:0006396 GO:0005730
- SO: SO:0000593
- PDB structures: PDBe

In molecular biology, snoRNA U57 (also known as SNORD57) is a member of the C/D box class of snoRNAs. This family functions to direct site-specific 2'-O-methylation of substrate RNAs.

This snoRNA was originally cloned from human HeLa cells during a screen for intron encoded snoRNAs. It is predicted to guide the 2'O-ribose methylation of 18S ribosomal RNA (rRNA) at residue A99 3
