= German submarine U-764 =

German World War II submarine

History

Nazi Germany
- Name: U-764
- Ordered: 15 August 1940
- Builder: Kriegsmarinewerft Wilhelmshaven
- Yard number: 147
- Laid down: 1 February 1941
- Launched: 13 March 1943
- Commissioned: 6 May 1943
- Fate: Surrendered on 14 May 1945 at Loch Eriboll, Scotland. She was later sunk, as part of Operation Deadlight in position 56°06′N 09°00′W, on 2 February 1946.

General characteristics
- Class & type: Type VIIC submarine
- Displacement: 769 tonnes (757 long tons) surfaced; 871 t (857 long tons) submerged
- Length: 67.10 m (220 ft 2 in) o/a; 50.50 m (165 ft 8 in) pressure hull
- Beam: 6.20 m (20 ft 4 in) o/a; 4.70 m (15 ft 5 in) pressure hull
- Draught: 4.74 m (15 ft 7 in)
- Installed power: 2,800–3,200 PS (2,100–2,400 kW; 2,800–3,200 bhp) (diesels); 750 PS (550 kW; 740 shp) (electric)
- Propulsion: 2 shafts; 2 × diesel engines; 2 × electric motors
- Speed: 17.7 knots (32.8 km/h; 20.4 mph) surfaced; 7.6 knots (14.1 km/h; 8.7 mph) submerged
- Range: 8,500 nmi (15,700 km; 9,800 mi) at 10 knots (19 km/h; 12 mph) surfaced; 80 nmi (150 km; 92 mi) at 4 knots (7.4 km/h; 4.6 mph) submerged
- Test depth: 230 m (750 ft); Crush depth: 250–295 m (820–968 ft)
- Complement: 4officers, 40–56 enlisted
- Armament: 5 × 53.3 cm (21 in) torpedo tubes (four bow, one stern); 14 × torpedoes; 1 × 8.8 cm (3.46 in) deck gun (220 rounds); 2 × twin 2 cm (0.79 in) C/30 anti-aircraft guns

Service record
- Part of: 8th U-boat Flotilla; 6 May – 31 October 1943; 9th U-boat Flotilla; 1 November 1943 – 30 September 1944; 11th U-boat Flotilla; 1 October 1944 – 8 May 1945
- Identification codes: M 51 834
- Commanders: Oblt.z.S. Hanskurt von Bremen; 6 May 1943 – 14 May 1945
- Operations: 8 patrols: 1st patrol: 26 October – 11 December 1943; 2nd patrol: 17 January – 15 March 1944; 3rd patrol: a. 26 – 28 April 1944; b. 18 – 28 May 1944; 4th patrol: 6 – 23 June 1944; 5th patrol: 6 August – 19 September 1944; 6th patrol: a. 26 December 1944 – 4 February 1945; b. 15 – 18 March 1945; 7th patrol: 19 – 23 March 1945; 8th patrol: 26 April – 14 May 1945
- Victories: 1 merchant ship sunk (638 GRT); 2 warships sunk (1,696 tons)

German submarine U-764 was a Type VIIC U-boat built for Nazi Germany's Kriegsmarine for service during World War II. She was laid down on 1 February 1941 by Kriegsmarinewerft Wilhelmshaven as yard number 147, launched on 13 March 1943 and commissioned on 6 May 1943 under Oberleutnant zur See Hanskurt von Bremen.

== Design ==
German Type VIIC submarines were preceded by the shorter Type VIIB submarines. U-764 had a displacement of 769 tonnes (757 long tons) when at the surface and 871 tonnes (857 long tons) while submerged. She had a total length of 67.10 m (220 ft 2 in), a pressure hull length of 50.50 m (165 ft 8 in), a beam of 6.20 m (20 ft 4 in), a height of 9.60 m (31 ft 6 in), and a draught of 4.74 m (15 ft 7 in). The submarine was powered by two Germaniawerft F46 four-stroke, six-cylinder supercharged diesel engines producing a total of 2,800 to 3,200 metric horsepower (2,060 to 2,350 kW; 2,760 to 3,160 shp) for use while surfaced, two Garbe, Lahmeyer & Co. RP 137/c double-acting electric motors producing a total of 750 metric horsepower (550 kW; 740 shp) for use while submerged. She had two shafts and two 1.23 m (4 ft) propellers. The boat was capable of operating at depths of up to 230 metres (750 ft).

The submarine had a maximum surface speed of 17.7 knots (32.8 km/h; 20.4 mph) and a maximum submerged speed of 7.6 knots (14.1 km/h; 8.7 mph). When submerged, the boat could operate for 80 nautical miles (150 km; 92 mi) at 4 knots (7.4 km/h; 4.6 mph); when surfaced, she could travel 8,500 nautical miles (15,700 km; 9,800 mi) at 10 knots (19 km/h; 12 mph). U-764 was fitted with five 53.3 cm (21 in) torpedo tubes (four fitted at the bow and one at the stern), fourteen torpedoes, one 8.8 cm (3.46 in) SK C/35 naval gun, 220 rounds, and two twin 2 cm (0.79 in) C/30 anti-aircraft guns. The boat had a complement of between forty-four and sixty.

== Service history ==
The boat's career began with training at 8th U-boat Flotilla on 6 May 1943, followed by active service on 1 November 1943 as part of the 9th Flotilla in Brest, France. On 1 October 1944, she transferred to 11th Flotilla in Bergen, Norway; as the situation worsened in France following the invasion. She remained with 11th Flotilla until her surrender at the end of the war.

In eight patrols she sank one merchant ship, for a total of 638 gross register tons (GRT), and 2 warships (1,696 tons).

=== Wolfpacks ===
U-764 took part in eight wolfpacks, namely:

- Eisenhart 3 (9 – 15 November 1943)
- Schill 3 (18 – 22 November 1943)
- Weddigen (22 – 29 November 1943)
- Hinein (26 January – 3 February 1944)
- Igel 1 (3 – 17 February 1944)
- Hai 1 (17 – 22 February 1944)
- Preussen (22 February – 13 March 1944)
- Dragoner (21 – 28 May 1944)

=== Fate ===
U-764 surrendered on 14 May 1945 at Loch Eriboll, Scotland. She was sunk as a target in position 56°06′N 09°00′W as part of Operation Deadlight on 2 February 1946.

== Summary of raiding history ==
Date	Ship Name	Nationality	Tonnage (Note: Merchant ship tonnages are in gross register tons. Military vessels are listed by tons displacement.)	Fate
15 June 1944	HMS Blackwood	Royal Navy	1,085	Sunk
20 August 1944	Coral	United Kingdom	638	Sunk
25 August 1944	HMS LCT-1074	Royal Navy	611	Sunk

== See also ==
- Convoy SL 140/MKS 31

== Bibliography ==
- Busch, Rainer; Röll, Hans-Joachim (1999). German U-boat commanders of World War II : a biographical dictionary. Translated by Brooks, Geoffrey. London, Annapolis, Md: Greenhill Books, Naval Institute Press. ISBN 1-55750-186-6.
- Busch, Rainer; Röll, Hans-Joachim (1999). Der U-Boot-Krieg, 1939-1945: Deutsche U-Boot-Verluste von September 1939 bis Mai 1945 [German U-boat losses from September 1939 to May 1945] (in German). Vol. IV. Hamburg, Berlin, Bonn: Mittler. ISBN 3-8132-0514-2.
- Gröner, Eric; Jung, Dieter; Maass, Martin (1991). German Warships 1815-1945: U-boats and Mine Warfare Vessels. Vol. 2. Translated by Thomas, Keith; Magowan, Rachel. London: Conway Maritime Press. ISBN 0-85177-593-4.
- Sharpe, Peter (1998). U-Boat Fact File. Great Britain: Midland Publishing. ISBN 1-85780-072-9.
