= USS Gillette (DE-681) =

Buckley-class destroyer escort

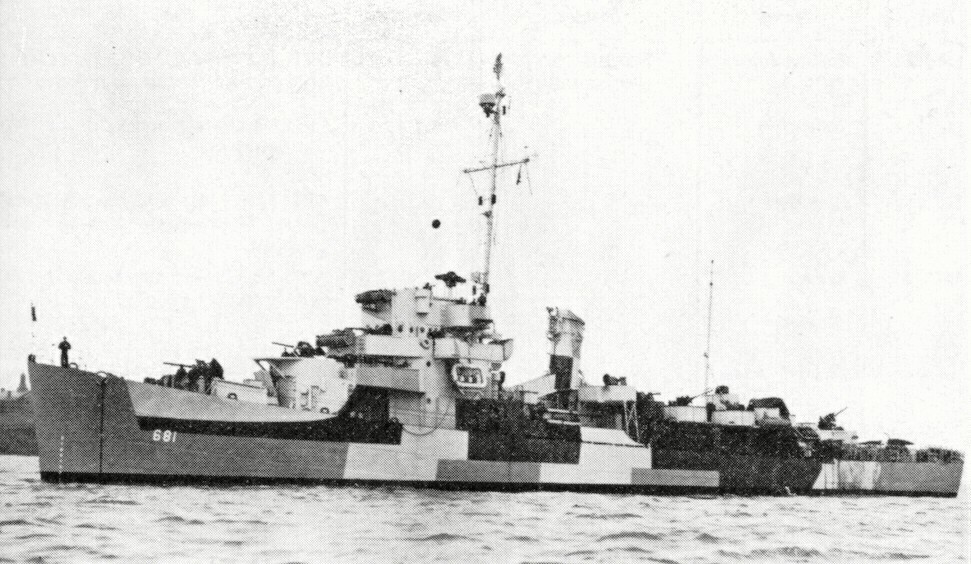
- USS Gillette (DE-681); June 1944.

History

United States
- Laid down: 24 August 1943
- Launched: 25 September 1943
- Commissioned: 27 October 1943
- Decommissioned: 3 February 1947
- Stricken: 1 December 1972
- Fate: Sold for scrap 11 September 1973

General characteristics
- Displacement: 1,740 tons full; 1,400 tons, standard
- Length: 306 ft 0 in (93.27 m)
- Beam: 36 ft 9 in (11.20 m)
- Draft: 13 ft 6 in (4.11 m)
- Propulsion: GE turbo-electric drive, 12,000 shp (8.9 MW); two propellers
- Speed: 24 knots (44 km/h)
- Range: 4,940 nautical miles (9,150 km) at 12 knots (22 km/h)
- Complement: 15 officers, 198 men
- Armament: 3 × 3 in (76 mm) DP guns, 3 × 21 in (53 cm) torpedo tubes, 4 × 40 mm AA gun, 8 × 20 mm cannon, 1 × hedgehog projector, 2 × depth charge tracks, 8 × K-gun depth charge projectors

USS Gillette (DE-681) was a Buckley-class destroyer escort of the United States Navy in service from 1943 to 1947. She was finally scrapped in 1973.

Gillette was named for Douglas Wiley Gillette, a naval officer killed in action in the Battle of Santa Cruz Islands on 26 October 1942.

== History ==
The ship launched on 25 September 1943 by the Bethlehem Steel Co.'s Fore River Shipyard, Quincy, Massachusetts; sponsored by Mrs. Pearl M. Gillette, the namesake's mother; and commissioned on 27 October 1943.

=== Battle of the Atlantic ===
After shakedown off Bermuda, Gillette sailed from Boston on 2 January 1944 for Balboa, C.Z., where for four months she conducted intensive exercises with submarines and escorted a convoy to Guantanamo Bay, Cuba, and returned. She sailed 9 May for Puerto Limon, Costa Rica, on a good-will tour and visited Barranquilla, Colombia, as well before returning to Boston 2 June.

From 4 July 1944 to 18 February 1945, Gillette made four round trip transatlantic escort voyages – three out of Hampton Roads and one from New York – to Oran and United Kingdom ports protecting Allied shipping. She subsequently served as a submarine training ship at New London, Connecticut, until 14 April 1945.

=== Pacific War ===
On 14 April 1945, she sailed for Hollandia via Borabora and Manus, and escorted a convoy thence to Manila, where she put in 17 June. Patrol and escort duties in the Philippines and to Ulithi occupied the busy ship until 6 August, when she sailed for Okinawa and returned as convoy escort to Subic Bay on 17 August. Following a round trip escort voyage from Subic Bay to Tokyo and return, Gillette continued patrol and logistics duties in the Philippines until departing Subic Bay on 26 November for San Diego, Calif., where she moored on 17 December 1945.

Gillette remained at San Diego until decommissioned there 3 February 1947 and placed in reserve with the Pacific group at San Diego.

=== Fate ===
Gillette was stricken from the Naval Vessel Register on 1 December 1972, sold on for scrapping on 11 September 1973.
