= HMS Bazely =

Frigate of the Royal Navy

History

United States
- Name: USS Bazely
- Builder: Boston Navy Yard
- Laid down: 5 April 1942
- Launched: 27 June 1942
- Fate: Transferred to Royal Navy, 18 February 1943

United Kingdom
- Name: HMS Bazely
- Acquired: 18 February 1943
- Decommissioned: 20 August 1945
- Identification: Pennant number K311
- Fate: Returned to USN 20 August 1945

United States
- Name: USS Bazely
- Commissioned: 20 August 1945
- Decommissioned: 22 October 1945
- Stricken: 16 November 1945
- Fate: Broken up 1946

General characteristics
- Class & type: Evarts-class destroyer escort
- Displacement: 1,400 long tons (1,422 t)
- Length: 289 ft 6 in (88.24 m)
- Beam: 35 ft (11 m)
- Draft: 10 ft (3.0 m)
- Speed: 19 knots (22 mph; 35 km/h)
- Complement: 175
- Armament: 3 × 3 in (76 mm) guns; 2 × 40 mm guns; 6 × 20 mm guns; 1 × Hedgehog anti-submarine mortar; 4 × depth charge projectors; 2 × depth charge tracks

Service record
- Victories: U-648, U-600 (1943); U-636 (1945)

The second USS Bazely (DE-2) was a Lend-Lease destroyer escort in the United States Navy. She served in the Royal Navy as HMS Bazely (K311) during World War II. The ship was returned to the United States following the war and was discarded shortly thereafter. She was named for John Bazely.

== Service history ==
Bazely was laid down on 5 April 1942 by the Boston Navy Yard and launched on 27 June 1942. Allocated to the Royal Navy under lend lease on 18 February 1943, Bazely given the pendant number K311. She earned battle honours in the Atlantic Ocean between 1943 and 1945 and in the Arctic Ocean in 1945. During her wartime career under the White Ensign, she figured prominently in the destruction of three German submarines. She teamed with Blackwood to sink U-600 on 25 November. Her second and last "kill" came on 21 April 1945, shortly before the end of the war in Europe, when she cooperated with Drury and Bentinck to destroy U-636.

The Royal Navy returned Bazely to American hands on 20 August 1945 at Chatham, England. Manned by officers and men from the frigate USS Surprise, that had been turned over to the Royal Navy after service in the U.S. Navy under reverse Lend-Lease, the former Captain-class frigate was commissioned as Bazely (DE 2) at 0810 the day of her return (20 August 1945).

After having embarked 39 passengers, Bazely got under way eight days later for the first leg of her homeward voyage. The next morning, she stood out of The Downs and sailed in Task Group (TG) 21.3, one of ten former British destroyer escorts being returned to the country of origin. She reached the Philadelphia Naval Shipyard on the evening of 8 September 1945, and remained there, inactive save for shifting berths and unloading ammunition at Fort Mifflin, through mid-October. On the afternoon of 22 October 1945, Bazely was decommissioned. Her name was struck from the Navy list on 16 November 1945, and the navy yard completed breaking her up by 28 May 1946.
