= German submarine U-606 =

German World War II submarine

History

Nazi Germany
- Name: U-606
- Ordered: 22 May 1940
- Builder: Blohm & Voss, Hamburg
- Yard number: 582
- Laid down: 12 March 1941
- Launched: 27 November 1941
- Commissioned: 22 January 1942
- Fate: Sunk on 22 February 1943

General characteristics
- Class & type: Type VIIC submarine
- Displacement: 769 tonnes (757 long tons) surfaced; 871 t (857 long tons) submerged
- Length: 67.10 m (220 ft 2 in) o/a; 50.50 m (165 ft 8 in) pressure hull
- Beam: 6.20 m (20 ft 4 in) o/a; 4.70 m (15 ft 5 in) pressure hull
- Height: 9.60 m (31 ft 6 in)
- Draught: 4.74 m (15 ft 7 in)
- Installed power: 2,800–3,200 PS (2,100–2,400 kW; 2,800–3,200 bhp) (diesels); 750 PS (550 kW; 740 shp) (electric)
- Propulsion: 2 shafts; 2 × diesel engines; 2 × electric motors
- Speed: 17.7 knots (32.8 km/h; 20.4 mph) surfaced; 7.6 knots (14.1 km/h; 8.7 mph) submerged
- Range: 8,500 nmi (15,700 km; 9,800 mi) at 10 knots (19 km/h; 12 mph) surfaced; 80 nmi (150 km; 92 mi) at 4 knots (7.4 km/h; 4.6 mph) submerged
- Test depth: 230 m (750 ft); Crush depth: 250–295 m (820–968 ft)
- Complement: 4 officers, 40–56 enlisted
- Armament: 5 × 53.3 cm (21 in) torpedo tubes (four bow, one stern); 14 × torpedoes or 26 TMA mines; 1 × 8.8 cm (3.46 in) deck gun (220 rounds); 1 x 2 cm (0.79 in) C/30 AA gun

Service record
- Part of: 5th U-boat Flotilla; 22 January – 31 August 1942; 11th U-boat Flotilla; 1 September – 31 October 1942; 9th U-boat Flotilla; 1 November 1942 – 22 February 1943
- Identification codes: M 47 254
- Commanders: Oblt.z.S. Hans Klatt; 22 January – 1 October 1942; Kptlt. Dietrich von der Esch; 14 – 26 September 1942; Oblt.z.S. Hans-Heinrich Döhler; 2 October 1942 – 22 February 1943
- Operations: 3 patrols: 1st patrol: 14 – 26 September 1942; 2nd patrol: 17 October – 5 December 1942; 3rd patrol: 4 January – 22 February 1943
- Victories: 3 merchant ships sunk (20,527 GRT); 2 merchant ships damaged (21,925 GRT)

German submarine U-606 was a Type VIIC U-boat built for Nazi Germany's Kriegsmarine for service during World War II. She was laid down on 12 March 1941 by Blohm & Voss, Hamburg as yard number 582, launched on 27 November 1941 and commissioned on 22 January 1942 under Oberleutnant zur See Hans Klatt.

== Design ==
German Type VIIC submarines were preceded by the shorter Type VIIB submarines. U-606 had a displacement of 769 tonnes (757 long tons) when at the surface and 871 tonnes (857 long tons) while submerged. She had a total length of 67.10 m (220 ft 2 in), a pressure hull length of 50.50 m (165 ft 8 in), a beam of 6.20 m (20 ft 4 in), a height of 9.60 m (31 ft 6 in), and a draught of 4.74 m (15 ft 7 in). The submarine was powered by two Germaniawerft F46 four-stroke, six-cylinder supercharged diesel engines producing a total of 2,800 to 3,200 metric horsepower (2,060 to 2,350 kW; 2,760 to 3,160 shp) for use while surfaced, two Brown, Boveri & Cie GG UB 720/8 double-acting electric motors producing a total of 750 metric horsepower (550 kW; 740 shp) for use while submerged. She had two shafts and two 1.23 m (4 ft) propellers. The boat was capable of operating at depths of up to 230 metres (750 ft).

The submarine had a maximum surface speed of 17.7 knots (32.8 km/h; 20.4 mph) and a maximum submerged speed of 7.6 knots (14.1 km/h; 8.7 mph). When submerged, the boat could operate for 80 nautical miles (150 km; 92 mi) at 4 knots (7.4 km/h; 4.6 mph); when surfaced, she could travel 8,500 nautical miles (15,700 km; 9,800 mi) at 10 knots (19 km/h; 12 mph). U-606 was fitted with five 53.3 cm (21 in) torpedo tubes (four fitted at the bow and one at the stern), fourteen torpedoes, one 8.8 cm (3.46 in) SK C/35 naval gun, 220 rounds, and a 2 cm (0.79 in) C/30 anti-aircraft gun. The boat had a complement of between forty-four and sixty.

== Service history ==
The boat's career began with training at 5th U-boat Flotilla on 22 January 1942, followed by active service on 1 September 1942 as part of the 11th Flotilla. After just two months, on 1 November 1942, she transferred to 9th Flotilla.

In three patrols she sank three merchant ships, for a total of 20,527 gross register tons (GRT), plus 2 merchant ships damaged for a total of 21,925 GRT.

=== Convoy ON 166 ===
Along with U-92, U-186, U-225, U-332, U-529, U-600, U-604, U-623, U-628, U-653 and U-753 she attacked Convoy ON 166 and was very successful sinking the British Empire Redshank and US ship Chattanooga City and damaging US ship Expositor (finished by U-303) on 22 February, before being damaged by depth charges launched from the destroyer ORP Burza.

=== Wolfpacks ===
U-606 took part in five wolfpacks, namely:

- Puma (26 – 29 October 1942)
- Natter (30 October – 8 November 1942)
- Kreuzotter (8 – 24 November 1942)
- Falke (8 – 19 January 1943)
- Haudegen (19 January – 15 February 1943)

=== Fate ===
U-606 was sunk on 22 February 1943 in the North Atlantic in position 47°44′N 33°43′W. She was damaged and forced to submerge by depth charges from Polish destroyer Burza, then she was found by USCGC Campbell and attacked with depth charges and gunfire. Older publications claimed, that the Campbell also rammed U-606, but apparently some U-boat had just collided with the Campbell, and it is not clear if it was U-606. There were 36 dead and 12 survivors (5 by the Campbell and 7 by the Burza). U-606 finally sank on 23 February, near dawn.

== Summary of raiding history ==
| Date | Ship Name | Nationality | Tonnage (GRT) | Fate |
|---|---|---|---|---|
| 28 October 1942 | Kosmos II | Norway | 16,966 | Damaged |
| 28 October 1942 | Gurney E. Newlin | United States | 8,225 | Sunk |
| 22 February 1943 | Chattanooga City | United States | 5,687 | Sunk |
| 22 February 1943 | Empire Redshank | United Kingdom | 6,615 | Sunk |
| 22 February 1943 | Expositor | United States | 4,959 | Damaged |

== Bibliography ==
- Busch, Rainer; Röll, Hans-Joachim (1999). German U-boat commanders of World War II : a biographical dictionary. Translated by Brooks, Geoffrey. London, Annapolis, Md: Greenhill Books, Naval Institute Press. ISBN 1-55750-186-6.
- Busch, Rainer; Röll, Hans-Joachim (1999). Der U-Boot-Krieg, 1939-1945: Deutsche U-Boot-Verluste von September 1939 bis Mai 1945 [German U-boat losses from September 1939 to May 1945] (in German). Vol. IV. Hamburg, Berlin, Bonn: Mittler. ISBN 3-8132-0514-2.
- Edwards, Bernard (1996). Dönitz and the Wolf Packs - The U-boats at War. Cassell. pp. 157–159, 162. ISBN 0-304-35203-9.
- Gröner, Eric; Jung, Dieter; Maass, Martin (1991). German Warships 1815-1945: U-boats and Mine Warfare Vessels. Vol. 2. Translated by Thomas, Keith; Magowan, Rachel. London: Conway Maritime Press. ISBN 0-85177-593-4.
- Sharpe, Peter (1998). U-Boat Fact File. Great Britain: Midland Publishing. ISBN 1-85780-072-9.
