= List of shipwrecks in February 1943 =

The list of shipwrecks in February 1943 includes ships sunk, foundered, grounded, or otherwise lost during February 1943.

== 1 February ==
List of shipwrecks: 1 February 1943
Ship	State	Description
USS De Haven	United States Navy	World War II: Operation Ke: The Fletcher-class destroyer was bombed and sunk in the Pacific Ocean two nautical miles (3.7 km; 2.3 mi) east of Savo Island, Solomon Islands with the loss of 167 of her 329 crew. One hundred and forty-six survivors were rescued by USS LCT-63 and USS LCT-181 (both United States Navy).
Fushimi Maru	Japan	World War II: The cargo ship was torpedoed and sunk in the Pacific Ocean (34°16′N 138°17′E) by USS Tarpon (United States Navy). A crew member was killed. Kokai Maru (Japan) rescued 214 survivors the next day.
Joseph Elise	France	World War II: The fishing vessel was shelled and sunk in the Atlantic Ocean off the coast of Morocco (28°03′N 12°54′W) by U-66 (Kriegsmarine) with the loss of one of her twelve crew.
HMS LCT 326	Royal Navy	The Mk III tank landing craft was lost in bad weather with all fourteen crew off Bardsey Island, Welsh county of Gwynedd.
Makigumo	Imperial Japanese Navy	World War II: The Yūgumo-class destroyer struck a mine and was damaged three nautical miles (5.6 km; 3.5 mi) south south west of Savo Island (9°15′S 159°47′E). Three of her crew were lost. The 264 survivors were rescued by Yūgumo (Imperial Japanese Navy), which scuttled the ship in the early hours of 2 January.
Othmarschen	Germany	World War II: The cargo ship was torpedoed and sunk by L-20 (Soviet Navy) off the Porsangerfjord (71°07′N 27°30′E). There were four dead and 39 survivors.
Pozzuoli	Italy	World War II: The cargo ship was torpedoed and sunk in the Mediterranean Sea off Cape San Vito, Sicily (38°13′N 12°50′E) by HMS Turbulent (Royal Navy). There were eleven dead and sixteen survivors.
USS PT-37	United States Navy	World War II: The Elco 80-foot PT boat was shelled and sunk by Kawakaze (Imperial Japanese Navy) off Guadalcanal, Solomon Islands. Ten of her eleven crew were killed.
USS PT-111	United States Navy	World War II: The Elco 80-foot PT boat was shelled and sunk by Kawakaze (Imperial Japanese Navy) off Guadalcanal. Two of her crew were killed.
USS PT-123	United States Navy	World War II: The Elco 77-foot PT boat was bombed and sunk by Japanese aircraft off Guadalcanal. Three of her crew were killed.
V 5909 Coronel	Kriegsmarine	World War II: The Seeteufel-class naval whaler/Vorpostenboot struck a mine and sank in Varangerfjord. Twenty-six of her crew died in the sinking.
V 6115 Ostwind	Kriegsmarine	World War II: The Polarkreis-class naval whaler/Vorpostenboot was torpedoed and sunk off Kiberg, Norway (70°25′N 31°02′E) by M-172 (Soviet Navy). Forty-five of her crew were killed.
HMS Welshman	Royal Navy	World War II: The Abdiel-class minelayer was torpedoed and sunk in the Mediterranean Sea east of Tobruk, Libya (32°12′N 24°52′E) by U-617 (Kriegsmarine) with the loss of 152 crew and thirteen passengers. One hundred and twenty-four survivors were rescued by HMS Belvoir and HMS Tetcott (both Royal Navy) and by small boats from Tobruk.

== 2 February ==
List of shipwrecks: 2 February 1943
Ship	State	Description
Jeremiah van Rensselaer	United States	World War II: Convoy HX 224: The Liberty ship was torpedoed and sunk in the Atlantic Ocean off the coast of Greenland (55°13′N 28°52′W) by U-456 (Kriegsmarine) with the loss of 47 of her 71 crew. Survivors and three bodies were rescued by the convoy rescue ship Accrington (United Kingdom) and landed at Gourock.
Salemi	Italy	World War II: The cargo ship was shelled and sunk in the Mediterranean Sea east of Capri by HMS P211 (Royal Navy). Seven of her crew were killed.
Valsavoia	Italy	World War II: The cargo ship was torpedoed and sunk in the Mediterranean Sea east of Capri (40°35′N 14°29′E) by HMS P211 (Royal Navy). A crew member was killed.
USS YC-886	United States Navy	The open lighter was being towed towards Curaçao, Curaçao and Dependencies by USS Algorma (United States Navy) when the tow broke. The boat then sank in heavy weather north of Curaçao. There were no casualties.

== 3 February ==
List of shipwrecks: 3 February 1943
Ship	State	Description
Cordelia	United Kingdom	World War II: Convoy HX 224: The tanker straggled behind the convoy. She was torpedoed and sunk in the Atlantic Ocean south of Iceland (56°37′N 22°58′W) by U-632 (Kriegsmarine) with the loss of 46 of her 47 crew. The survivor was rescued by U-632 and made a prisoner of war.
Dorchester	United States Army	World War II: Convoy SG 19: The troopship was torpedoed and sunk in the Atlantic Ocean 150 nautical miles (280 km; 170 mi) west of Cape Farewell, Greenland (59°22′N 48°42′W) by U-223 (Kriegsmarine) with the loss of 675 of the 904 people aboard including fifteen navy gunners and four army chaplains. Survivors were rescued by USCGC Comanche and USCGC Escanaba (both United States Coast Guard).
Greylock	United States	World War II: Convoy RA 52: The Design 1133 ship was torpedoed and damaged in the Norwegian Sea (70°52′N 0°21′W) by U-255 (Kriegsmarine). Her 70 crew were rescued by HMS Harrier, HMT Lady Madeleine and HMT Northern Wave (all Royal Navy). She was scuttled by one of the Royal Navy vessels.
Inverilen	United Kingdom	World War II: Convoy HX 224: The tanker was torpedoed and damaged in the Atlantic Ocean (56°35′N 23°30′W) by U-456 (Kriegsmarine) with the loss of 31 of her 47 crew. She was abandoned by the survivors, who were rescued by HMS Asphodel (Royal Navy). Inverilen later sank at 56°13′N 20°35′W.
Rhexenor	United Kingdom	World War II: The cargo ship was torpedoed and sunk in the Atlantic Ocean (24°59′N 43°57′W) by U-217 (Kriegsmarine) with the loss of three of her 70 crew. One survivor was taken aboard U-217 as a prisoner of war. Others were rescued by HMY Conqueror (Royal Navy) or reached land in their lifeboats.
RO 21	Kriegsmarine	The transport ship ran aground on the Pierres des Portes, off Saint-Malo, Ille-et-Vilaine, France. The wreck was broken up in 1945.
Saetta	Regia Marina	World War II: The Freccia-class destroyer struck a mine and sank in the Mediterranean Sea. There were 170 dead and 25 survivors.
U-265	Kriegsmarine	World War II: The Type VIIC submarine was depth charged and sunk in the Atlantic Ocean (56°35′N 22°49′W) by a Boeing B-17 Flying Fortress aircraft of 220 Squadron, Royal Air Force with the loss of all 46 crew.
Uragano	Regia Marina	World War II: The Ciclone-class torpedo boat struck a mine and sank in the Mediterranean Sea. There were 114 dead and 15 survivors.

== 4 February ==
List of shipwrecks: 4 February 1943
Ship	State	Description
Le Tre Marie	Italy	World War II: The cargo ship was torpedoed and sunk south of Punta Alice (39°16′N 17°11′E) by HMS Unseen (Royal Navy). Her crew were rescued by a tug. A crew member was slightly wounded.
No 2	Soviet Union	The government-owned Bolinder Type landing barge hulk was sunk at Southern Ozereyka near Novorossiysk.
No 4	Soviet Union	The government-owned Bolinder Type landing barge hulk was sunk at Southern Ozereyka near Novorossiysk.
No 6	Soviet Union	The government-owned Bolinder Type landing barge hulk was sunk at Southern Ozereyka near Novorossiysk.
SKA-051	Soviet Navy	World War II: The MO-4-class patrol vessel struck a mine and sank in the Black Sea off Novorossiysk.
SKA-0141	Soviet Navy	World War II: The MO-4-class patrol vessel struck a mine and sank in the Black Sea off Novorossiysk.
U-187	Kriegsmarine	World War II: The Type IXC/40 submarine was depth charged and sunk in the Atlantic Ocean (50°12′N 36°35′W) by HMS Beverley and HMS Vimy (both Royal Navy) with the loss of nine of her 54 crew.

== 5 February ==
List of shipwrecks: 5 February 1943
Ship	State	Description
Corona	Norway	World War II: Convoy AW 22: The cargo ship was torpedoed and damaged in the Mediterranean Sea (32°11′N 24°46′E) by U-617 (Kriegsmarine). All 103 people aboard were rescued by HMS ML 356 and HMS ML 1012 (both Royal Navy). Corona was taken under tow by HMS Erica (Royal Navy) and beached at Tobruk, Libya. She sank on 24 February but was refloated on 17 October 1947, only to sink two days later whilst under tow.
Henrik	Norway	World War II: Convoy AW 22: The cargo ship was torpedoed and sunk in the Mediterranean Sea (32°11′N 24°46′E) by U-617 (Kriegsmarine) with the loss of two of her 46 crew. Survivors were rescued by vessels escorting the convoy.
"Margaret Wetherly"	United Kingdom	The 115.4-foot (35.2 m) trawler sank in severe weather 5 miles south of Loch Spelve, Isle of Mull. All crew saved.
HMS Stronsay	Royal Navy	World War II: The Isles-class trawler struck a mine and sank in the Mediterranean Sea off Philippeville, Algeria. Her crew survived.
Tristan	Germany	The cargo ship disappeared en route from Danzig to Memel.
UJ 1108 Elbe	Kriegsmarine	World War II: The auxiliary submarine chaser was torpedoed and sunk off Berlevåg, Norway (70°12′N 27°41′E) by K-3 (Soviet Navy) with the loss of nineteen of her 52 crew.
Utilitas	Italy	World War II: The tanker was torpedoed and sunk east of Palermo, Italy (38°10′N 13°43′E) by HMS Turbulent (Royal Navy) with the loss of two of her 24 crew.
V 1602 La Provence	Kriegsmarine	World War II: The Vorpostenboot struck a mine and sank in the Skaggerak with the loss of 39 of her crew.
West Portal	United States	World War II: Convoy SC 118: The cargo ship straggled behind the convoy. She was torpedoed and sunk in the Atlantic Ocean (approximately 53°N 33°W) by U-413 (Kriegsmarine) with the loss of all 77 crew.

== 6 February ==
List of shipwrecks: 6 February 1943
Ship	State	Description
Grundsee	Germany	The cargo ship disappeared in the Baltic Sea north of Memel.
I-O-16	Luftwaffe	The Siebelgefäß landing craft was driven ashore and wrecked in the Mediterranean Sea off North Africa.
I-O-30	Luftwaffe	The Siebelgefäß landing craft was driven ashore and wrecked in the Mediterranean Sea off North Africa.
I-O-31	Luftwaffe	The Siebelgefäß landing craft was driven ashore and wrecked in the Mediterranean Sea off North Africa.
HMS LCM 80	Royal Navy	The landing craft mechanized was wrecked at Benghazi, Libya.
HMCS Louisburg	Royal Canadian Navy	World War II: The Flower-class corvette was bombed and sunk in the Mediterranean Sea off Oran, Algeria by Regia Aeronautica aircraft with the loss of 42 of her 92 crew. Survivors were rescued by HMS Lookout (Royal Navy).
Nagisan Maru	Imperial Japanese Navy	World War II: The Nagisan Maru-class auxiliary transport was torpedoed and damaged in the Pacific Ocean off Tinian, South Seas Mandate by USS Flying Fish (United States Navy) and was beached. Two of her crew were killed. She was refloated on 15 February. Repaired and returned to service in November 1943.
Polyktor	Greece	World War II: Convoy SC 118: The cargo ship straggled behind the convoy. She was torpedoed and sunk in the Atlantic Ocean (53°04′N 33°04′W) by U-266 (Kriegsmarine) with the loss of 32 of her 34 crew. Survivors were taken aboard U-266 as prisoners of war.
SF 207	Luftwaffe	World War II: The Siebel ferry was bombed, or mined, and sunk in the Mediterranean Sea between Sicily, Italy and Tunisia.
SKA-0154	Soviet Navy	World War II: The MKM Type patrol vessel was sunk by coastal artillery off Stanichka.
Zagloba	Poland	World War II: Convoy SC 118: The cargo ship struggled behind the convoy. She was torpedoed and sunk in the Atlantic Ocean (54°45′N 27°25′W) by U-262 (Kriegsmarine) with the loss of all 26 crew.

== 7 February ==
List of shipwrecks: 7 February 1943
Ship	State	Description
Adamas	Greece	World War II: Convoy SC 118: The cargo ship collided with one of the escorting destroyers in the Atlantic Ocean. She was scuttled by HMS Beverley (Royal Navy) (56°35′N 22°3′W). Lobelia (Free French Naval Forces) rescued thirteen survivors.
Afrika	United Kingdom	World War II: Convoy SC 118: The cargo ship was torpedoed and sunk in the Atlantic Ocean south east of Cape Farewell, Greenland (55°16′N 26°31′W) by U-402 (Kriegsmarine) with the loss of 23 of the 60 people aboard. Survivors were rescued by HMS Campanula and HMS Mignonette (both Royal Navy).
Baltonia	United Kingdom	World War II: Convoy MKS 7: The cargo ship struck a mine and sank in the Strait of Gibraltar (35°58′N 5°59′W with the loss of eleven of her 62 crew. Survivors were rescued by Kingsland (United Kingdom.
Daghild	Norway	World War II: Convoy SC 118: The cargo ship straggled behind the convoy. She was torpedoed and damaged in the Atlantic Ocean by U-402 (Kriegsmarine) and was abandoned by her 39 crew, who were rescued by Lobelia (Free French Naval Forces). Daghild was torpedoed and sunk the next day at 55°25′N 26°12′W) by U-608 (Kriegsmarine).
Empire Banner	United Kingdom	World War II: The cargo ship was torpedoed and damaged in the Mediterranean Sea off the coast of Algeria by U-77 (Kriegsmarine). She was then bombed and sunk by Luftwaffe aircraft. All 72 people aboard were rescued by HMCS Camrose (Royal Canadian Navy).
Empire Mordred	United Kingdom	World War II: Convoy MKS 7: The cargo ship struck a mine broke in two in the Strait of Gibraltar (35°58′N 5°59′W). Both sections sank with the loss of fifteen of her 70 crew. Survivors were rescued by HMS Scarborough (Royal Navy).
Empire Webster	United Kingdom	World War II: Convoy KMS 8: The cargo ship was torpedoed and sunk in the Mediterranean Sea off Algiers, Algeria 36°47′N 1°37′E) by U-77 (Kriegsmarine) with the loss of four of the 63 people aboard. Survivors were rescued by HMCS Camrose (Royal Canadian Navy).
Harmala	United Kingdom	World War II: Convoy SC 118: The cargo ship was torpedoed and sunk in the Atlantic Ocean (55°14′N 26°37′W) by U-614 (Kriegsmarine) with the loss of 43 of her 54 crew. Survivors were rescued by Lobelia (Free French Naval Forces).
Henry R. Mallory	United States	World War II: Convoy SC 118: The troopship was torpedoed and sunk in the Atlantic Ocean 600 nautical miles (1,100 km) south west of Iceland (55°18′N 26°29′W) by U-402 (Kriegsmarine) with the loss of 272 of the 494 people aboard. Survivors were rescued by USCGC Bibb and USCGC Ingham (both United States Coast Guard).
K-22	Soviet Navy	World War II: The K-class submarine struck a mine and sank in the North Sea off the Helnes Lighthouse, Norway with the loss of all 77 crew.
Kalliopi	Greece	World War II: Convoy SC 118: The cargo ship was torpedoed and sunk in the Atlantic Ocean (55°27′N 26°08′W) by U-402 (Kriegsmarine) with the loss of four of her 36 crew.
HMS LCI(L) 162	Royal Navy	World War II: The landing craft infantry (large) (194/384 t, 1942) was torpedoed and sunk in the Mediterranean Sea by U-596 (Kriegsmarine) with the loss of 18 of the 25 on board.
HMS LCT 2335	Royal Navy	World War II: Convoy SC 118: The landing craft tank was being transported as deck cargo aboard Daghild (Norway) and was lost when that ship was torpedoed and sunk.
Mary Slessor	United Kingdom	World War II: Convoy MKS 7: The cargo ship (5,027 GRT, 1930) struck a mine and sank in the Strait of Gibraltar (35°55′N 6°02′W) with the loss of 32 of the 80 people aboard. Survivors were rescued by HMS Landguard (Royal Navy).
Nerva	Norway	The cargo ship ran aground in a blizzard off Rørvik.
Renne	Kriegsmarine	World War II: The Aurocks-class patrol tugboat\tug was bombed by Allied aircraft at Lorient, Morbihan.
Robert E. Hopkins	United States	World War II: Convoy SC 118: The tanker was torpedoed and sunk in the Atlantic Ocean 650 nautical miles (1,200 km; 750 mi) west of Malin Head, County Donegal, Ireland (55°13′N 26°22′W) by U-402 (Kriegsmarine) with the loss of fifteen of her 57 crew. Survivors were rescued by Mignonette (Royal Navy).
HMT Tervani	Royal Navy	World War II: The naval trawler was torpedoed and sunk in the Mediterranean Sea off the coast of Algeria by Acciaio (Regia Marina) with the loss of all 22 crew.
Toward	United Kingdom	World War II: Convoy SC 118: The convoy rescue ship was torpedoed and sunk in the Atlantic Ocean south east of Cape Farewell (55°13′N 26°22′W) by U-402 (Kriegsmarine) with the loss of 46 of the 74 people aboard. Survivors were rescued by HMS Mignonette (Royal Navy).
U-609	Kriegsmarine	World War II: The Type VIIC submarine was depth charged and sunk in the Atlantic Ocean (55°17′N 26°38′W) by Lobelia (Free French Naval Forces) with the loss of all 47 crew.
U-624	Kriegsmarine	World War II: The Type VIIC submarine was depth charged and sunk in the Atlantic Ocean (55°42′N 26°17′W) by Boeing B-17 Flying Fortress aircraft of 220 Squadron Royal Air Force with the loss of all 45 crew.

== 8 February ==
List of shipwrecks: 8 February 1943
Ship	State	Description
HMT Bredon	Royal Navy	World War II: The Hill-class trawler was torpedoed and sunk in the Atlantic Ocean off the Canary Islands, Spain (29°49′N 14°05′W) by U-521 (Kriegsmarine) with the loss of all 43 crew.
Iron Knight	Australia	World War II: Convoy OC 8: The cargo ship was torpedoed and sunk in the Pacific Ocean 15 nautical miles (28 km; 17 mi) off Montague Island, Australia (36°51′S 149°44′E) by I-21 (Imperial Japanese Navy) with the loss of 36 of her 50 crew. Survivors were rescued by Le Triomphant (Free French Naval Forces).
Kusuyama Maru	Imperial Japanese Army	World War II: The British WWI B-class standard cargo ship was torpedoed and sunk in the Pacific Ocean 55 nautical miles (102 km) west of Takao, Formosa, China (22°30′N 119°03′E) by USS Tunny (United States Navy) with the loss of all 47 crew.
HMS LCM 61	Royal Navy	The landing craft mechanized sank in a storm in Benghazi Harbor, Libya.
No. 86	Soviet Navy	The G-5-class motor torpedo boat was lost on this date.
Newton Ash	United Kingdom	World War II: Convoy SC 118: The cargo ship was torpedoed and sunk in the Atlantic Ocean south of Iceland (56°25′N 22°26′W) by U-402 (Kriegsmarine) with the loss of 34 of her 38 crew. Survivors were rescued by USCGC Ingham ( United States Coast Guard).
Northern Sword	United States	World War II: Convoy GZ 1: The cargo ship collided with Fisher Ames (United States and sank in the Caribbean Sea (10°28′N 79°32′W).
Roger B. Taney	United States	World War II: The cargo ship was torpedoed and sunk in the South Atlantic (22°00′S 7°45′W) by U-160 (Kriegsmarine) with the loss of three of her 57 crew. Survivors were rescued by Bagé ( Brazil) and Penrith Castle (United Kingdom).
SF 98	Luftwaffe	The Siebel ferry was wrecked in the Mediterranean Sea off Tunisia.
SF 208	Luftwaffe	The Siebel ferry was driven ashore and wrecked in the Mediterranean Sea off Tunisia.
Tatsuta Maru	Imperial Japanese Navy	World War II: The Asuma Maru-class troopship was torpedoed and sunk in the Pacific Ocean 43 nautical miles (80 km; 49 mi) south east of Mikura-jima (33°45′N 140°25′E) by USS Tarpon (United States Navy). All 1,223 troops and 198 crew were killed, either in the sinking, or they could not be found in the fierce gale in the night.

== 9 February ==
List of shipwrecks: 9 February 1943
Ship	State	Description
Avorio	Regia Marina	World War II: The Acciaio-class submarine was depth charged and damaged in the Mediterranean Sea by HMCS Regina (Royal Canadian Navy). She was taken in tow, but foundered some hours later. Nineteen Italian sailors were killed and the 27 survivors, including seven wounded, were captured by HMCS Regina.
HMS Erica	Royal Navy	World War II: The Flower-class corvette struck a mine and sank in the Mediterranean Sea off Derna, Libya. All of her officers and 71 ratings were rescued by HMSAS Southern Maid (South African Navy). Casualties were one rating missing and another who died of wounds.
Eritrea	Italy	World War II: The cargo ship was torpedoed and sunk east of Monopoli (40°56′N 17°36′E) by HMS Unbending (Royal Navy).
F 278	Kriegsmarine	The MFP-A landing craft ran aground on Blassfjord, Norway and was lost.
Malachite	Regia Marina	World War II: The Perla-class submarine was torpedoed and sunk off Cagliari, Sardinia (38°42′N 08°52′E) by HNLMS Dolfijn (Royal Netherlands Navy) with the loss of 35 of her 48 crew.
Pan Royal	United States	World War II: Convoy UGS 5: The Design 1019 ship collided with Evita (Norway) and George Davis (United States) and sank in the Atlantic Ocean (36°40′N 67°20′W) with the loss of eight of her 62 crew. Survivors were rescued by USS Boyle (United States Navy).

== 10 February ==
List of shipwrecks: 10 February 1943
Ship	State	Description
Amari Maru	Japan	World War II: The cargo ship was torpedoed and sunk in the Pacific Ocean by USS Pickerel (United States Navy).
Cosala	Italy	World War II: The cargo ship was torpedoed and damaged off Punta Staletti by HMS Una (Royal Navy) with the loss of a crew member. She was beached 2.3 nautical miles (4.2 km) from Marina di Badolato and was declared a total loss.
Queen Anne	United Kingdom	World War II: Convoy CA 11: The cargo ship was torpedoed and sunk in the Atlantic Ocean off Cape Agulhas, Union of South Africa (34°53′S 19°51′E) by U-509 (Kriegsmarine) with the loss of five of her 45 crew. Survivors were rescued by HMT St Zeno (Royal Navy) or reached land in their lifeboats.
SF 205	Luftwaffe	World War II: The Siebel ferry was bombed and sunk in the Mediterranean Sea north east of Cape Bon Tunisia.
SF 206	Luftwaffe	World War II: The Siebel ferry was bombed and sunk in the Mediterranean Sea north east of Cape Bon.
Saroena	Netherlands	World War II: The tanker was torpedoed and damaged in the Mediterranean Sea (33°47′N 35°09′E) by U-81 (Kriegsmarine) with the loss of two of her 59 crew. The ship was beached near Beirut, Lebanon. Saroena was refloated on 12 February. She was later repaired and returned to service.
Starr King	United States	Starr King World War II: The Liberty ship was torpedoed in the Pacific Ocean (34°15′S 154°20′E) by I-21 (Imperial Japanese Navy). All aboard (37 crewmen, sixteen armed guards and two passengers) survived and were rescued by HMAS Warramunga (Royal Australian Navy), that attempted to tow the damaged ship but failed. Starr King sank the next night.

== 11 February ==
List of shipwrecks: 11 February 1943
Ship	State	Description
Al Kasbanah	Egypt	World War II: The sailing ship was shelled and sunk in the Mediterranean Sea 40 nautical miles (74 km; 46 mi) west of Tripoli, Libya (35°02′N 34°35′E) by U-81 (Kriegsmarine).
Dolphin	Palestine	World War II: The sailing ship was shelled and sunk in the Mediterranean Sea 40 nautical miles (74 km; 46 mi) west of Tripoli (35°02′N 34°35′E) by U-81 (Kriegsmarine).
Grete	Denmark	World War II: The cargo ship was torpedoed and sunk in the Gulf of Valencia off Cape Oropesa by HMS Torbay (Royal Navy). Her crew were rescued by a Spanish ship.
Helmspey	United Kingdom	World War II: The cargo ship was torpedoed and sunk in the Indian Ocean 11 nautical miles (20 km; 13 mi) south of Cape St. Francis, Union of South Africa (34°22′S 24°54′E) by U-516 (Kriegsmarine) with the loss of four of the 46 people aboard. Survivors were rescued by R-4 ( South African Air Force).
Hoeisan Maru	Imperial Japanese Army	World War II: The Horaisan Maru-class auxiliary transport was torpedoed and damaged off Corregidor, Philippines (14°16′N 120°28′E) by USS Grayling (United States Navy) and was beached in Sissiman Cove, Luzon, Philippines. Four of her crew were killed. Later the wreck was refloated and converted into a floating anti-aircraft battery at Manila, Philippines.
Husni	Lebanon	World War II: The sailing ship was shelled and sunk in the Mediterranean Sea 40 nautical miles (74 km) west of Tripoli 35°02′N 34°35′E by U-81 (Kriegsmarine).
I-18	Imperial Japanese Navy	World War II: The I-16-class submarine was depth charged and sunk in the Coral Sea 200 nautical miles (370 km) south of San Cristóbal, Solomon Islands (14°15′S 161°53′E) by USS Fletcher (United States Navy) with the loss of all 102 crew.
Kurt Hartwig Siemers	Germany	The cargo ship was driven ashore at Nidingen, Norway. She was declared a total loss.
Lola	Germany	World War II: The coastal tanker was torpedoed and sunk in the Mediterranean Sea by HMS Unison (Royal Navy).
Sabah el Kheir	Egypt	World War II: The sailing ship was shelled and sunk in the Mediterranean Sea off Jaffa, Palestine by U-81 (Kriegsmarine).

== 12 February ==
List of shipwrecks: 12 February 1943
Ship	State	Description
Castilian	United Kingdom	The cargo ship struck East Platters Rocks, near The Skerries, Anglesey, and sank.
Fechenheim	Germany	World War II: The cargo ship was torpedoed and damaged off Båtsfjord, Norway by K-3 (Soviet Navy) and was consequently beached. She was refloated on 16 March and was towed to Germany in January 1944. She was deemed beyond repair.
Sveggsund	Norway	The coaster's cargo caught fire and she burned and sank in Billefjord, Norway.
U-442	Kriegsmarine	World War II: The Type VIIC submarine was depth charged and sunk in the Atlantic Ocean west of Cape St. Vincent, Portugal (37°32′N 11°56′W) by a Lockheed Hudson aircraft of 48 Squadron, Royal Air Force.

== 13 February ==
List of shipwrecks: 13 February 1943
Ship	State	Description
August Blume	Germany	The cargo ship departed from Danzig for Aalborg but then vanished in the Baltic Sea with the loss of all hands.
Bolshoi Shantar	Soviet Union	The cargo ship was wrecked on Bering Island.
Mafalda	Regia Marina	World War II: The auxiliary minesweeper was torpedoed and sunk off Isola Molat, Yugoslavia by HMS Thunderbolt (Royal Navy).
Sagami Maru	Japan	World War II: The Sakito Maru-class cargo ship was torpedoed and sunk at anchor in Talomo Bay (07°02′N 125°33′E) by USS Seawolf (United States Navy) with an unknown number of casualties.
U-620	Kriegsmarine	World War II: The Type VIIC submarine was depth charged and sunk in the Atlantic Ocean north west of Lisbon, Portugal (39°18′N 11°17′W) by a Consolidated PBY Catalina aircraft of 202 Squadron, Royal Air Force with the loss of all 47 crew.

== 14 February ==
List of shipwrecks: 14 February 1943
Ship	State	Description
Hirotama Maru	Imperial Japanese Navy	World War II: The Peacetime Standard Type D auxiliary transport was torpedoed, shelled and sunk in the Makassar Strait 73 miles (117 km) west of Cape Mandal, Celebes, Netherlands East Indies (03°59′S 117°30′E) by USS Trout (United States Navy) with the loss of 29 crew.
Hitachi Maru	Imperial Japanese Navy	World War II: The Koshin Maru-class auxiliary transport was bombed and sunk off Buin, Papua New Guinea by Boeing B-17 Flying Fortress aircraft of the United States Army Air Force or by Consolidated PB4Y aircraft of the United States Navy at 06°45′S 155°50′E. Four of her crew were killed.
Krasny Profintern	Soviet Union	World War II: The cargo ship was torpedoed and sunk south west of Tuapse by U-19 (Kriegsmarine) with the loss of a crew member.

== 15 February ==
List of shipwrecks: 15 February 1943
Ship	State	Description
Atlantic Sun	United States	World War II: Convoy ON 165: The tanker straggled behind the convoy due to engine trouble. She was torpedoed and sunk in the Atlantic Ocean (approximately 51°N 41°W) by U-607 (Kriegsmarine) with the loss of 65 of her 66 crew. The survivor was taken aboard U-607 as a prisoner of war.
Lecce	Italy	World War II: The cargo ship was sunk in an Allied air raid on Naples.
Modica	Italy	World War II: The cargo ship was sunk in an Allied air raid on Naples. She was raised in March 1947, repaired and returned to service.
Petrarca	Italy	World War II: The cargo ship was torpedoed and sunk in the Mediterranean Sea 10 nautical miles (19 km) of Cotrone, Sicily by HMS Una (Royal Navy). There were 79 dead and five survivors. The ship had run aground whilst avoiding an air attack and 31 men ashore at the time of the attack also survived.
Suruga Maru	Imperial Japanese Navy	World War II: The Suraga Maru-class auxiliary storeship was torpedoed and sunk in the Pacific Ocean 35 nautical miles (65 km; 40 mi) north east of Buin, Papua New Guinea (6°25′S 156°05′E) by USS Gato (United States Navy). Two of her crew were killed.
Tateyama Maru	Japan	World War II: The cargo ship was torpedoed and sunk in the Pacific Ocean by USS Pickerel (United States Navy).
U-529	Kriegsmarine	World War II: The Type IXC/40 submarine was depth charged and sunk in the Atlantic Ocean (55°45′N 31°09′W) by Consolidated B-24 Liberator aircraft of 120 Squadron, Royal Air Force with the loss of all 48 crew.

== 16 February ==
List of shipwrecks: 16 February 1943
Ship	State	Description
USS Amberjack	United States Navy	World War II: The Gato-class submarine was depth charged and sunk in the Pacific Ocean off Rabaul, Papua New Guinea, by a Japanese aircraft and by Hiyodori and CH-18 (both Imperial Japanese Navy).
C I P No. 1	United States	The scow sank off Otter Point, Umnak Island, Territory of Alaska (53°24′50″N 167°50′35″W).
Capo Orso	Italy	World War II: The cargo ship was torpedoed and sunk by aircraft south-west of Marsala (37°40′N 12°07′E).
Hyuga Maru	Imperial Japanese Navy	World War II: The Hyuga Maru-class naval trawler/auxiliary storeship was torpedoed and sunk in the Pacific Ocean 13.5 nautical miles (25.0 km; 15.5 mi) off Agrihan Island, Mariana Islands (04°10′S 116°05′E) by USS Flying Fish (United States Navy). Four of her crew were killed. A naval trawler rescued the survivors.
Kola	Soviet Union	World War II: The cargo ship was torpedoed and sunk in the Pacific Ocean by USS Sawfish (United States Navy). Her master, 44 crewmen, ten Soviet Navy personnel, and sixteen other passengers were killed in the sinking or died during the two weeks spent in lifeboats before reaching land. There were four survivors.
Listo	Germany	World War II: The cargo ship struck a mine and sank off Spodsbjerg, Denmark.
Melilla	Germany	World War II: The cargo ship struck a mine and sank off IJmuiden, North Holland, Netherlands.
Passubio	Italy	World War II: The cargo ship was torpedoed and sunk in the Mediterranean Sea south of Calabria (38°18′N 16°29′E) by HMS Unrivalled (Royal Navy).
SF 152	Luftwaffe	The Siebel ferry was driven ashore and wrecked, or foundered, in a storm in the Mediterranean Sea between Sicily, Italy and Tunisia.
Sparviero	Italy	World War II: The coaster was torpedoed and sunk in the Mediterranean Sea south of Calabria by HMS Unrivalled (Royal Navy).

== 17 February ==
List of shipwrecks: 17 February 1943
Ship	State	Description
Baron Ailsa	United Kingdom	World War II: The cargo ship struck a mine and sank in the North Sea (53°17′04″N 1°11′30″E) with the loss of two of her 36 crew.
Deer Lodge	United States	World War II: The cargo ship was torpedoed and sunk in the Indian Ocean 60 nautical miles (110 km; 69 mi) east of Port Elizabeth, Union of South Africa (33°46′S 26°57′E) by U-516 (Kriegsmarine) with the loss of two of her 57 crew. Survivors were rescued by HMSAS Africana (South African Navy), HMHS Atlantis (Royal Navy) and the fishing trawler Havorn (Union of South Africa).
F 473	Kriegsmarine	World War II: The Marinefährprahm struck a mine and sank in the Black Sea south west of Feolent, Soviet Union.
Ilmen	Soviet Union	World War II: The cargo ship was torpedoed and sunk in the Pacific Ocean off the east coast of Kyushu, Japan (30°56′N 135°30′E) by USS Sawfish (United States Navy) with the loss of seven of her 42 crew. Survivors were rescued by Kashirstroi (Soviet Union).
Llanashe	United Kingdom	World War II: The cargo ship was torpedoed off Port Elizabeth, Union of South Africa (34°00′S 28°30′E)by U-182 (Kriegsmarine) with the loss of 33 lives.
S 71	Kriegsmarine	World War II: The Type 1939/40 Schnellboot was shelled, rammed and sunk by HMS Garth (Royal Navy).
U-69	Kriegsmarine	World War II: The Type VIIC submarine was depth charged, rammed and sunk in the Atlantic Ocean (50°36′N 41°07′W) by HMS Fame (Royal Navy) with the loss of all 46 crew.
U-201	Kriegsmarine	World War II: The Type VIIC submarine was depth charged and sunk in the Atlantic Ocean (50°50′N 40°50′W) by HMS Viscount (Royal Navy) with the loss of all 49 crew.
U-205	Kriegsmarine	World War II: The Type VIIC submarine was depth charged and sunk in the Mediterranean Sea (32°56′N 22°01′E) by a Bristol Bisley aircraft of the South African Air Force and also by HMS Paladin (Royal Navy) with the loss of eight of her 50 crew.
XXI Aprile	Italy	World War II: The Design 1017 ship was torpedoed and sunk in the Mediterranean Sea west of Sicily (38°13′N 12°43′E) by HMS Splendid (Royal Navy).

== 18 February ==
List of shipwrecks: 18 February 1943
Ship	State	Description
Akagane Maru	Japan	World War II: The cargo ship was shelled and damaged in the Pacific Ocean south west of Attu Island, Territory of Alaska by USS Gillespie and USS Indianapolis (both United States Navy). Akagane Maru sank two days later at 53°05′N 171°22′E.
Brasiloide	Brazil	World War II: The cargo ship was torpedoed and sunk in the Atlantic Ocean five nautical miles (9.3 km; 5.8 mi) off the Garcia D'Avila Lighthouse (12°38′S 37°57′W) by U-518 (Kriegsmarine). All 50 crew survived.
Col di Lana	Italy	World War II: The cargo ship was torpedoed and sunk by British aircraft north-west of Palermo, Sicily (38°29′N 12°49′E).
RD 24	Regia Marina	The RD-class minesweeper foundered in a storm off Egadi.
Saint Albert	Germany	The cargo ship struck the breakwater at Valencia, Spain and sank. The wreck was broken up in situ in 1946.

== 19 February ==
List of shipwrecks: 19 February 1943
Ship	State	Description
Ockenfels	Germany	World War II: The cargo ship struck a mine and sank in the North Sea off Borkum.
Somedono Maru	Imperial Japanese Army	World War II: The Somedono Maru-class transport ship was bombed and sunk at Buin, Papua New Guinea by Boeing B-17 Flying Fortress aircraft. Two passengers and 26 of her crew were killed.
U-268	Kriegsmarine	World War II: The Type VIIC submarine was depth charged and sunk in the Bay of Biscay (47°03′N 5°56′W) by a Vickers Wellington aircraft of 172 Squadron, Royal Air Force with the loss of all 44 crew.
U-562	Kriegsmarine	World War II: The Type VIIC submarine was depth charged and sunk in the Mediterranean Sea north east of Benghazi, Libya by a Vickers Wellington aircraft of 38 Squadron, Royal Air Force and also by HMS Hursley and HMS Isis (both Royal Navy) with the loss of all 49 crew.
V 408 Haltenbank	Kriegsmarine	World War II: The Vorpostenboot was torpedoed and sunk in the Atlantic Ocean off the coast of Spain by USS Blackfish (United States Navy).
Zeus	Greece	World War II: Convoy ONS 165: The cargo ship straggled behind the convoy. She was torpedoed and sunk in the Atlantic Ocean (49°28′N 44°50′W) by U-403 (Kriegsmarine) with the loss of all 38 crew.

== 20 February ==
List of shipwrecks: 20 February 1943
Ship	State	Description
BK 1	Kriegsmarine	The concrete-hulled barge was wrecked at Fevåg, Norway (63°41′N 09°49′E) after breaking loose from her tow in a storm.
Kjøbenhavn	Denmark	World War II: The cargo ship struck a mine and sank off Borkum, Germany. All aboard survived, three of them being wounded.
Ōshio	Imperial Japanese Navy	World War II: The Asashio-class destroyer was torpedoed and sunk off Wewak, New Guinea, at 00°50′S 146°06′E by USS Albacore (United States Navy) while under tow in the Pacific Ocean 70 miles (110 km) north-west of Manus Island, Admiralty Islands, with the loss of eight of her crew. Survivors were rescued by Arashio (Imperial Japanese Navy).
Radhurst	United Kingdom	World War II: Convoy ONS 165: The cargo ship straggled behind the convoy. She was torpedoed and sunk in the Atlantic Ocean 500 nautical miles (930 km) north north west of St. John's, Dominion of Newfoundland (49°50′N 41°50′W) by U-525 (Kriegsmarine) with the loss of all 42 crew.
SF 99	Luftwaffe	The Siebel ferry was wrecked in a storm in the Mediterranean Sea off the coast of Tunisia.
SF 209	Luftwaffe	The Siebel ferry was wrecked in a storm in the Mediterranean Sea at Cape Bon, Tunisia.
SF 215	Luftwaffe	The Siebel ferry was lost in a storm in the Mediterranean Sea between Sicily, Italy and Tunisia.
SF 216	Luftwaffe	The Siebel ferry was lost in a storm in the Mediterranean Sea between Sicily and Tunisia.
Shinkoku Maru	Imperial Japanese Navy	World War II: The Kasuga Maru-class auxiliary transport was torpedoed and sunk 450 nautical miles (830 km) north of Ponape, Caroline Islands, 280 nautical miles (520 km) north west of Eniwetok (15°09′S 159°30′E) by USS Halibut (United States Navy). Either lost with all crew, or with eleven of her crew killed.
USS YMS-133	United States Navy	The minesweeper foundered in a storm at Coos Bay, Oregon. Eight of her 29 crew were reported missing. The 21 survivors were rescued by a United States Coast Guard surf boat and a fishing boat, but the weather was so bad that they could not be landed for 24 hours and five of them died of wounds and exposure.

== 21 February ==
List of shipwrecks: 21 February 1943
Ship	State	Description
Artemis Pitta	Greece	World War II: The cargo ship was torpedoed and sunk at Melos by Martin B-26 Marauder aircraft of 14 Squadron, Royal Air Force. Fifteen Greek crew members and eleven German soldiers were killed.
Baalbeck	Germany	World War II: The cargo ship was torpedoed and sunk in the Mediterranean Sea off Cape Bon, Algeria by HMS Unruffled (Royal Navy).
Empire Trader	United Kingdom	World War II: Convoy ON 60: The cargo ship was torpedoed and damaged in the Atlantic Ocean by U-92 (Kriegsmarine). She was escorted towards the Azores, Portugal by HMCS Dauphin (Royal Canadian Navy) but was scuttled at 48°27′N 29°47′W following orders received from the Admiralty. Her crew were rescued by Stockport (United Kingdom).
Dora Horn	Germany	World War II: The cargo vessel was torpedoed and sunk by HMS Unruffled (Royal Navy) off the Kerkenna Islands.
H. H. Rogers	Panama	World War II: Convoy ONS 167: The tanker was torpedoed and sunk in the Atlantic Ocean 550 nautical miles (1,020 km) west of the Fastnet Rock (50°30′N 24°38′W) by U-664 (Kriegsmarine). Her 73 crew were rescued by Rathlin (United Kingdom).
Kuwayama Maru	Japan	World War II: The troopship was torpedoed and damaged in the Flores Sea (7°54′S 119°13′E) by USS Thresher (United States Navy). Twelve soldiers and a crew member were killed. The ship went dead in the water and was abandoned. USS Thresher torpedoed and sunk her the next day.
Rosario	United States	World War II: Convoy ONS 167: The cargo ship was torpedoed and sunk in the Atlantic Ocean 550 nautical miles (1,020 km) west of the Fastnet Rock (50°30′N 24°38′W) by U-664 (Kriegsmarine) with the loss of three gunners and 30 of her crew. Survivors were rescued by Rathlin (United Kingdom).
SF 211	Luftwaffe	The Siebel ferry was driven ashore and wrecked in the Mediterranean Sea off Cape Bon.
Stigstad	Norway	World War II: Convoy ON 166: The tanker straggled behind the convoy. She was torpedoed and sunk in the Atlantic Ocean 49°26′N 29°08′W) by U-332 and U-604 (both Kriegsmarine) with the loss of three of her 37 crew. Survivors were rescued by the fishing trawler Thomas Boot (United Kingdom).
Thorsheimer	Germany	World War II: The tanker was bombed and sunk in the Mediterranean Sea 20 nautical miles (37 km) south west of Marettimo, Italy by British aircraft.
U-623	Kriegsmarine	World War II: The Type VIIC submarine was depth charged and sunk in the Atlantic Ocean (48°08′N 29°37′W) by a Consolidated B-24 Liberator aircraft of 120 Squadron, Royal Air Force with the loss of all 46 crew.

== 22 February ==
List of shipwrecks: 22 February 1943
Ship	State	Description
Chattanooga City	United States	World War II: Convoy ON 166: The cargo ship was torpedoed and sunk in the Atlantic Ocean (46°53′N 34°32′W) by U-606 (Kriegsmarine). Her 58 crew were rescued by HMCS Trillium (Royal Canadian Navy).
Empire Redshank	United Kingdom	World War II: Convoy ON 166: The Design 1022 ship was torpedoed and damaged in the Atlantic Ocean (46°53′N 34°32′W) by U-606 (Kriegsmarine). Her 47 crew were rescued by HMCS Trillium (Royal Canadian Navy), which scuttled the ship.
Expositor	United States	World War II: Convoy ON 166: The Design 1022 ship straggled behind the convoy. She was torpedoed and damaged in the Atlantic Ocean (46°53′N 34°32′W) by U-606 (Kriegsmarine) with the loss of seven of her 60 crew. Survivors abandoned ship and were rescued by HMCS Trillium (Royal Canadian Navy). Expositor was torpedoed and sunk the next day (47°00′N 34°30′W) by U-303 (Kriegsmarine).
Gerd	Germany	World War II: The cargo ship was bombed and sunk in the Mediterranean Sea (37°45′N 11°37′E) by Allied aircraft based on Malta.
N. T. Nielsen Alonso	Norway	World War II: Convoy ON 166: The factory ship straggled behind the convoy. She was torpedoed and damaged in the Atlantic Ocean 800 nautical miles (1,500 km) east of Cape Race, Dominion of Newfoundland (48°00′N 31°24′W) by U-92 and U-753 (both Kriegsmarine) with the loss of three of her 53 crew. N. T. Nielson Alonso was scuttled at 48°N 34°W by ORP Burza (Polish Navy). Survivors were rescued by USCGC Campbell ( United States Coast Guard).
Padre Felice	Yugoslav Partisans	World War II: The small 35 ton transport ship was shelled by Ugliano (Regia Marina) and exploded off Solta island, in the Adriatic Sea.
Roxburgh Castle	United Kingdom	World War II: The cargo ship was torpedoed and sunk in the Atlantic Ocean north of the Azores, Portugal (38°12′N 26°22′W) by U-107 (Kriegsmarine). Her 64 crew survived.
U-225	Kriegsmarine	World War II: The Type VIIC submarine was depth charged and sunk in the Atlantic Ocean (48°37′N 30°35′W) by HMS Dianthus (Royal Navy) with the loss of all 46 crew.
U-606	Kriegsmarine	World War II: The Type VIIC submarine was depth charged and sunk in the Atlantic Ocean (47°44′N 33°43′W) by ORP Burza (Polish Navy) and USCGC Campbell ( United States Coast Guard) with the loss of 36 of her 47 crew.
HMCS Weyburn	Royal Canadian Navy	World War II: Convoy MKS 8: The Flower-class corvette struck a mine and sank in the Mediterranean Sea east of Gibraltar (35°46′N 6°02′W) with the loss of nine of her 77 crew. Survivors were rescued by HMS Black Swan and HMS Wivern (both Royal Navy).
USS YP-72	United States Navy	The yard patrol craft ran aground and sank either at Spruce Cape, Kodiak, Territory of Alaska, or at Adak Island, Territory of Alaska.

== 23 February ==
List of shipwrecks: 23 February 1943
Ship	State	Description
Alexander Ulyanov	Soviet Union	World War II: The cargo ship was sunk at Tuapse by Luftwaffe aircraft. Fifty-two crew members and stevedores were killed.
Athelprincess	United Kingdom	World War II: Convoy UC 1: The tanker straggled behind the convoy. She was torpedoed and sunk in the Atlantic Ocean west of Madeira, Portugal (32°02′N 24°38′W) by U-522 (Kriegsmarine) with the loss of one of her 51 crew. Survivors were rescued by HMS Weston (Royal Navy).
Empire Norseman	United Kingdom	World War II: Convoy UC 1: The Norwegian-type tanker was torpedoed and damaged in the Atlantic Ocean south of the Azores, Portugal by U-382 (Kriegsmarine). Her 53 crew were rescued by HMS Totland (Royal Navy). Empire Norseman was later torpedoed and sunk at 31°18′N 27°20′W) by U-558 (Kriegsmarine).
Esso Baton Rouge	United States	World War II: Convoy UC 1: The tanker was torpedoed and sunk in the Atlantic Ocean (31°15′N 27°22′W) by U-202 (Kriegsmarine) with the loss of three of her 68 crew. Survivors were rescued by HMS Totland (Royal Navy).
Eulima	United Kingdom	World War II: Convoy ON 166: The tanker straggled behind the convoy. She was torpedoed and sunk in the Atlantic Ocean (46°48′N 36°18′W) by U-186 (Kriegsmarine) with the loss of 62 of her 63 crew. The survivor was taken aboard U-186 as a prisoner of war.
Fintra	United Kingdom	World War II: The cargo ship was torpedoed and sunk in the Mediterranean Sea north east of Algiers, Algeria (36°57′N 3°41′E) by U-371 (Kriegsmarine) with the loss of 12 of the 35 people aboard.
Glittre	Norway	World War II: Convoy ON 166: The tanker was torpedoed and sunk in the Atlantic Ocean (47°00′N 36°20′W) by U-628 (Kriegsmarine) with the loss of three of her 37 crew. Survivors were rescued by HMS Dianthus (Royal Navy).
Hastings	United States	World War II: Convoy ON 166: The cargo ship was torpedoed and sunk in the Atlantic Ocean (46°30′N 36°23′W) by U-186 (Kriegsmarine) with the loss of seven of her 62 crew. Survivors were rescued by HMCS Chilliwack (Royal Canadian Navy).
Jonathan Sturges	United States	World War II: The Liberty ship was torpedoed and sunk in the Atlantic Ocean (46°15′N 38°11′W) by U-707 (Kriegsmarine). Seven gunners were rescued by USS Belknap (United States Navy) on 12 March, two gunners and four crewmen were rescued and made prisoners of war by U-336 (Kriegsmarine) on 6 April.
Kuroshio Maru	Japan	World War II: The cargo ship was sunk in an air attack at Rabaul, Papua New Guinea.
Kyleclare	Ireland	World War II: The cargo ship was torpedoed and sunk in the Atlantic Ocean (48°50′N 13°20′W) by U-456 (Kriegsmarine) with the loss of all eighteen crew.
Monte Igueldo	Spain	World War II: The cargo ship was torpedoed and sunk in the Atlantic Ocean (4°46′S 31°55′W) by Barbarigo (Regia Marina) with the loss of one of her 35 crew.
SF 87	Luftwaffe	World War II: The Siebel ferry was bombed and sunk in the Mediterranean Sea off Cape Bon Tunisia.
SF 210	Luftwaffe	World War II: The Siebel ferry was bombed and sunk in the Mediterranean Sea north east of Cape Bon.
Stockport	United Kingdom	World War II: Convoy ON 166: The convoy rescue ship had fallen behind the convoy whilst rescuing survivors from Empire Trader (United Kingdom). She had transferred them to HMCS Dauphin (Royal Canadian Navy) and was attempting to regain the convoy when she was torpedoed and sunk in the Atlantic Ocean (47°22′N 34°10′W) by U-604 (Kriegsmarine) with the loss of all 64 crew.
U-443	Kriegsmarine	World War II: The Type VIIC submarine was depth charged and sunk in the Mediterranean Sea off Algiers, Algeria (36°55′N 2°25′E) by HMS Bicester, HMS Lamerton and HMS Wheatland (all Royal Navy) with the loss of all 48 crew.
U-522	Kriegsmarine	World War II: The Type IXC submarine was depth charged and sunk in the Atlantic Ocean (31°27′N 26°22′W) by Totland (Royal Navy) with the loss of all 51 crew.
Winkler	Panama	World War II: Convoy ON 166: The tanker straggled behind the convoy due to the breakdown of one of her four engines. She was torpedoed and damaged in the Atlantic Ocean by U-628 (Kriegsmarine). She was later torpedoed and sunk (46°48′N 36°18′W) by U-223 (Kriegsmarine) with the loss of nineteen of her 51 crew. Survivors were rescued by HMS Dianthus (Royal Navy).
USS YP-336	United States Navy	The yard patrol craft sank in the Delaware River off Port Penn, Delaware after hitting an obstruction. There were no casualties.

== 24 February ==
List of shipwrecks: 24 February 1943
Ship	State	Description
Alcamo	Italy	World War II: The cargo ship was bombed and damaged in the Mediterranean Sea by Royal Air Force aircraft. She sank the next day 62 nautical miles (115 km) north north east of Marettimo, Sicily.
F 143	Kriegsmarine	World War II: The Marinefährprahm struck a mine and sank in the Black Sea off Kerch, Soviet Union with the loss of all thirteen people aboard.
Ingria	Norway	World War II: Convoy ON 166: The cargo ship was torpedoed and damaged in the Atlantic Ocean (45°12′N 39°17′W) by U-600 (Kriegsmarine). Ingria was abandoned by her 37 crew and was then scuttled by U-628 (Kriegsmarine). Her crew were rescued by HMCS Rosthern (Royal Canadian Navy).
Jonathan Sturges	United States	World War II: Convoy ON 166: The Liberty ship straggled behind the convoy. She was torpedoed and sunk in the Atlantic Ocean (46°15′N 38°11′W) by U-707 (Kriegsmarine) with the loss of 51 of her 75 crew. Survivors were rescued by USS Belknap (United States Navy).
Madoera	Netherlands	World War II: Convoy ON 166: The cargo ship was torpedoed and damaged in the Atlantic Ocean (46°02′N 39°20′W) by U-653 (Kriegsmarine) and was abandoned by her 86 crew. Sixteen of her crew reboarded the ship at daybreak and she reached St. John's, Dominion of Newfoundland on 1 March. Other survivors were rescued by USS Belknap (United States Navy), U-591 and U-753 (both Kriegsmarine) but 62 of her crew were lost.
HMS MTB 262	Royal Navy	World War II: The Elco 70-foot motor torpedo boat was scuttled by her crew after engine failure in the Mediterranean Sea off Cape Serrat, Tunisia. Five of her crew drowned while trying to reach the coast, the survivors being captured by Germans. Sources also say the boat was bombed and sunk by German aircraft, that may have attacked the drifting wreck.
Nathanael Greene	United States	World War II: Convoy MKS 8: The Liberty ship was torpedoed and damaged in the Mediterranean Sea 40 nautical miles (74 km; 46 mi) north east of Oran, Algeria by U-565 (Kriegsmarine) with the loss of four of her 57 crew. She was then torpedoed and further damaged by a Luftwaffe aircraft. Nathanael Green was taken in tow by HMS Brixham (Royal Navy), which rescued the survivors. The tow was later transferred to HMS Restive (Royal Navy) and the ship was beached at Salamanda. She was declared a total loss.
Partizan	Yugoslav Partisans	World War II: The patrol boat was sunk at Podgora by Ugliano (Regia Marina) assisted by Regia Aeronautica aircraft. The Italian vessel attacked the Partisan-held port with 81mm mortars. The jetty at Podgora concealed the Partisan flotilla from the sea.
U-649	Kriegsmarine	The Type VIIC submarine collided with U-232 (Kriegsmarine) in the Baltic Sea (55°15′N 17°15′E) and sank with the loss of 35 of her 46 crew.
HMS Vandal	Royal Navy	The U-class submarine sank in the Sound of Bute off Inchmarnock, Argyllshire with the loss of all 37 crew.
V 1249 Mewa VIII	Kriegsmarine	World War II: The Vorpostenboot struck a mine and sank in the North Sea north of Borkum.

== 25 February ==
List of shipwrecks: 25 February 1943
Ship	State	Description
HMS LCP(L) 87	Royal Navy	The landing craft personnel (large) was lost on this date.
Manchester Merchant	United Kingdom	World War II: Convoy ON 166: The cargo ship was torpedoed and sunk in the Atlantic Ocean 390 nautical miles (720 km; 450 mi) south east of Cape Race, Dominion of Newfoundland (45°10′N 43°23′W) by U-628 (Kriegsmarine) with the loss of 35 of her 67 crew. Survivors were rescued by HMCS Montgomery and HMCS Rosthern (both Royal Canadian Navy).
Takao Maru	Imperial Japanese Navy	The auxiliary minesweeper was lost on this date.
V 2008 Ritzebüttel	Kriegsmarine	World War II: The Vorpostenboot struck a mine and sank in the Broad Fourteens off Westkapelle, West Flanders, Belgium. Ten of her crew were killed.
W 6	Germany	World War II: The water boat was bombed and sunk in a Royal Air Force raid on Wilhelmshaven.

== 26 February ==
List of shipwrecks: 26 February 1943
Ship	State	Description
Brosäter	Sweden	The cargo ship ran aground near Hallands Väderö. She had to be abandoned and was wrecked by the sea. There were no casualties.
Empire Portia	United Kingdom	World War II: The cargo ship was bombed and damaged at Murmansk, Soviet Union, by Junkers Ju 88 aircraft of the Luftwaffe. She was subsequently repaired and returned to service.
F 176	Kriegsmarine	World War II: The MFP-A landing craft was severely damaged by Soviet aircraft at Taman, Soviet Union. There were one person killed and six wounded. She was towed to Kerch, Soviet Union, for repairs but was sunk by another air attack on 1 March. F 176 was salvaged in October 1944 and put into Soviet service as BDB-13.
Hohenfriedburg	Germany	World War II: The tanker was shelled and sunk in the Atlantic Ocean west of Spain (41°48′N 20°50′W) by HMS Sussex (Royal Navy). Her crew and four Finnish passengers were rescued by U-264 (Kriegsmarine).
Juan de Astigarraga	Spain	World War II: The cargo ship was torpedoed and sunk in the Ligurian Sea off Genoa, Italy by HMS Torbay (Royal Navy) with the loss of four of her 26 crew.
Kyo Maru No. 3 GO	Imperial Japanese Navy	World War II: The auxiliary minesweeper struck a mine off Rangoon, Burma (15°36′N 96°15′E) and sank.
Mariaeck	Germany	World War II: The cargo ship was sunk with gunfire in the Ligurian Sea about 30 nautical miles (56 km; 35 mi) south of Cape Mele, Italy (43°27′N 08°08′E) by HMS Torbay (Royal Navy).

== 27 February ==
List of shipwrecks: 27 February 1943
Ship	State	Description
Asakasan Maru	Imperial Japanese Army	World War II: The Asosan Maru-class auxiliary troop transport was sunk in the Indian Ocean 90 miles (140 km) southeast of Rangoon, Burma (15°53′N 27°29′E) by Consolidated B-24 Liberator aircraft of the United States Tenth Air Force. Four of her crew were killed.
Bodø	Norway	The coaster ran aground and sank at Bogskjærene. She was raised in 1960 and scrapped.
HNLMS Colombia (1930)	Royal Netherlands Navy	World War II: The submarine tender was torpedoed and sunk in the Indian Ocean off Simonstown, Union of South Africa (33°36′S 27°29′E) by U-516 (Kriegsmarine) with the loss of eight of her 326 crew. Survivors were rescued by HMS Genista (Royal Navy) and a Royal Air Force launch.
HMT Harstad	Royal Navy	World War II: Convoy WP 300: The auxiliary minesweeper was torpedoed and sunk in Lyme Bay (50°24′21″N 3°01′41″W) by S 68 (Kriegsmarine) with the loss of 25 of her 26 crew (20 Norwegian and five British).
Kirikawa Maru	Imperial Japanese Navy	World War II: The Shunko Maru-class auxiliary transport was severely damaged by American aircraft northeast of Vella Lavella, Solomon Islands and was scuttled by her escort (7°32′S 156°44′E). There were probably no survivors.
Krasnaya Gruziya	Soviet Navy	World War II: The Elipidifor type auxiliary gunboat was torpedoed and damaged in the Black Sea at Myskhato by S 28, S 51, S 72, and S 102 (all Kriegsmarine) and beached. She was later destroyed by German artillery and aircraft. At least thirteen of her crew were killed.
HMS LCT 381	Royal Navy	World War II: Convoy WP 300: The landing craft tank was torpedoed in Lyme Bay by S 85 (Kriegsmarine). A crew member was killed. She was then finished by gunfire by S 65 (Kriegsmarine) after the eleven survivors had been rescued and captured by the German boats.
HMT Lord Hailsham	Royal Navy	World War II: Convoy WP 300: The naval trawler was torpedoed and sunk in Lyme Bay by S 65 (Kriegsmarine). There were eighteen dead and nineteen survivors.
Mius	Soviet Union	World War II: The tug was sunk by S 28, S 51, S 72, and S 102 (all Kriegsmarine) in the Black Sea at Myskhato. Ten of her crew were killed.
Modavia	United Kingdom	World War II: Convoy WP 300: The cargo ship was torpedoed and sunk in Lyme Bay by S 68 and S 81 (both Kriegsmarine). Her 54 crew were rescued.
St Margaret	United Kingdom	World War II: The cargo ship was torpedoed and sunk in the Atlantic Ocean (27°38′N 43°23′W) by U-66 (Kriegsmarine) with the loss of three of her 50 crew. Survivors were rescued by USS Hobson (United States Navy).
HMS Tigris	Royal Navy	World War II: The T-class submarine was presumed sunk in a depth charge attack in the Mediterranean Sea six nautical miles (11 km; 6.9 mi) of Capri, Italy by UJ 2210 (Kriegsmarine) with the loss of all 63 crew.
TM 25	Royal Netherlands Navy	World War II: The TM 22-class motor torpedo boat was sunk south of Pont Kanon, Curaçao, Curaçao and Dependencies by an explosion. Her crew were rescued with only minor injuries.
T 403 Gruz	Soviet Navy	World War II: The Project 3 minesweeper was sunk in the Black Sea at Myskhato by S 28, S 51, S 72, and S 102 (all Kriegsmarine).
V 276 Baicin	Regia Marina	World War II: The auxiliary patrol vessel was attacked with gunfire south-west of La Spezia (43°37′N 09°25′E) by HMS Torbay (Royal Navy). After her crew abandoned her, she was boarded and sunk with demolition charges by the submarine crew. There were no casualties.
V 1318 Hans Pickenpack	Kriegsmarine	World War II: The Vorpostenboot struck a mine and sank in the North Sea north west of Vlieland, Friesland, Netherlands with the loss of 22 of her crew.

== 28 February ==
List of shipwrecks: 28 February 1943
Ship	State	Description
FR 111	Regia Marina	World War II: The Requin-class submarine was bombed and sunk 10 nautical miles (19 km) north of Murro di Porco, Sicily by Allied aircraft with the loss of 23 of her 49 crew.
Ischia	Italy	World War II: The cargo ship was torpedoed and sunk 1 nautical mile (1.9 km) off Portofino by HMS Torbay (Royal Navy).
Loch Awe	United Kingdom	The fishing trawler was last seen on this day off the Chicken Rock, Isle of Man. She disappeared with her eleven crew for an unknown reason.
HMMGB79	Royal Navy	World War II: The BPB 72'-class motor gun boat was shelled and sunk in the North Sea off the Hook of Holland, South Holland, Netherlands by V 1304 Eisenach, FlJ 23, V 1314 Gustav Hugo Deiters, V 1309 Kapitän Stemmer, M 379, V 1313 Uran, and V 1305 Wuppertal (all Kriegsmarine).
Paolo	Italy	World War II: The cargo ship was bombed by aircraft at Cagliari, Italy. She was set afire and sank. While the ship was under repair from the bombing she caught fire and was destroyed on 13 May or 11 June 1943. She was later refloated and scrapped.
RPT-1, and RPT-3	Soviet Navy	World War II: Convoy HX 227: The Higgins 78'-class PT boats were being carried as deck cargo aboard Wade Hampton (United States) and were both lost when that ship was torpedoed and sunk by U-405 (Kriegsmarine).
S 35	Kriegsmarine	World War II: The E-boat struck a mine and sank in the Mediterranean Sea ten nautical miles (19 km; 12 mi) north west of Bizerte, Tunisia with the loss of all 22 of her crew.
Santa Rita	Italy	World War II: The cargo ship was bombed, set afire and partly sunk by Allied aircraft at Cagliari, Sicily. She was refloated in June 1945, repaired and returned to service.
SF 220	Luftwaffe	World War II: The Siebel ferry was mined and sunk in the Mediterranean Sea between Sicily and Tunis. Tunisia (37°39′N 10°50′E). There were one dead and eleven wounded.
Wade Hampton	United States	World War II: Convoy HX 227: The Liberty ship straggled 8 nautical miles (15 km) behind the convoy. She was torpedoed and sunk in the Atlantic Ocean 250 nautical miles (460 km; 290 mi) east of Cape Farewell, Greenland (59°49′N 34°43′W) by U-405 (Kriegsmarine) with the loss of nine of her 52 crew. Survivors were rescued by HMS Beverley and HMS Vervain (both Royal Navy).

== Unknown date ==
List of shipwrecks: Unknown date 1943
Ship	State	Description
Benty	France	World War II: The cargo ship was sunk at Naples, Italy through war causes. She was refloated in 1947 and scrapped.
Gulfport	United States	The dredger foundered 18 nautical miles (33 km) off Clearwater, Florida (28°00′N 82°00′W) on 13 or 14 February.
Shinkoku Maru	Japan	World War II: The cargo ship was reported missing after 18 February. Most sources states that she was torpedoed and sunk in the Pacific Ocean 280 nautical miles (520 km; 320 mi) north west of Eniwetok Atoll (15°09′N 159°30′E) by USS Halibut (United States Navy). Another source states the ship was en route from Ponape Island to Kwajalein, Marshall Islands when sunk. Casualties also are contradictory. Most sources state the ship sank with all hands but a Japanese source reports only eleven of her crew were killed.
SK-0164	Soviet Navy	The KM-4 patrol vessel was sunk sometime in February.
HNoMS Uredd	Royal Norwegian Navy	World War II: Operation Seagull: The U-class submarine struck a mine and sank off Fugløyvær, Norway, on or after 10 February with the loss of all 40 people aboard.
USS YC-887	United States Navy	The open lighter was reported by several United States Navy sources to have sunk on 3 February 1943 in heavy weather at Guantanamo Bay, Cuba, together with YC-886. As the latter actually sank the day before and elsewhere in the Caribbean area, it is possible that the date and place in these sources are when and where the loss was reported, and not when and where it occurred.
