= Hans-Heinrich Döhler =

German U-boat commander

- Born: 5 December 1917; Bad Schwartau, Schleswig-Holstein, German Empire
- Died: 22 February 1943 (aged 25); North Atlantic Ocean
- Military career
- Allegiance: Nazi Germany
- Branch: Kriegsmarine
- Service years: 1937–43
- Rank: Oberleutnant zur See
- Commands: U-21; U-606
- Conflicts: World War II
- Awards: U-boat War Badge 1939, Iron Cross 1st Class

Hans-Heinrich Döhler (5 December 1917 – 22 February 1943) was a German U-boat commander in World War II.

== Naval career ==
Hans-Heinrich Döhler joined Nazi Germany's Kriegsmarine in 1937. He served on the heavy cruiser Deutschland (later renamed Lützow) from July 1939 to April 1940. He went through U-boat training from April to September 1940. From September 1940 to June 1941 he served with the 2. Unterseeboots-Lehrdivision (2. U-boat Training Division). In July 1941 Döhler became the Second Watch Officer on U-751, serving under the command of Gerhard Bigalk. He went out on two patrols with the boat, spending 67 days at sea. Döhler went through U-boat Commander training with the 26th U-boat Flotilla from November to December 1941. Upon completing the course he commanded the "duck" U-21, a school boat, from 4 January 1942 to 24 September 1942. On 2 October 1942 Döhler took command of the Type VIIC boat U-606. After only two weeks with the new command he left Bergen, Norway to his first war patrol in the North Atlantic. U-606 left for its second patrol on 4 January 1943 and spend 50 days in the North Atlantic. On 22 February Döhler sank two ships (12,302) and damaged one (4,959) from Convoy ON 166.

== Fate ==
Döhler was killed on 22 February 1943 when U-606 was sunk in the North Atlantic by depth charges from the US coastguard cutter Campbell and the Polish destroyer Burza.

== Summary of Career ==
=== Ships sunk ===
Date	U-boat	Name of ship	Nationality	Tonnage	Fate
28 October 1942	U-606	Gurney E. Newlin	United States	8,225	Sunk
22 February 1943	U-606	Chattanooga City	United States	5,687	Sunk
22 February 1943	U-606	Empire Redshank	United Kingdom	6,615	Sunk

=== Awards ===
- Iron Cross 2nd Class - November 1939
- U-boat War Badge 1939 - 9 November 1941
- Iron Cross 1st Class - 6 December 1942

== Bibliography ==
- Busch, Rainer; Röll, Hans-Joachim (1999). German U-boat commanders of World War II : a biographical dictionary. Translated by Brooks, Geoffrey. London, Annapolis, Md: Greenhill Books, Naval Institute Press. ISBN 1-55750-186-6.
