= Convoy ON 166 =

Convoy during naval battles of the Second World War

- Part of Battle of the Atlantic
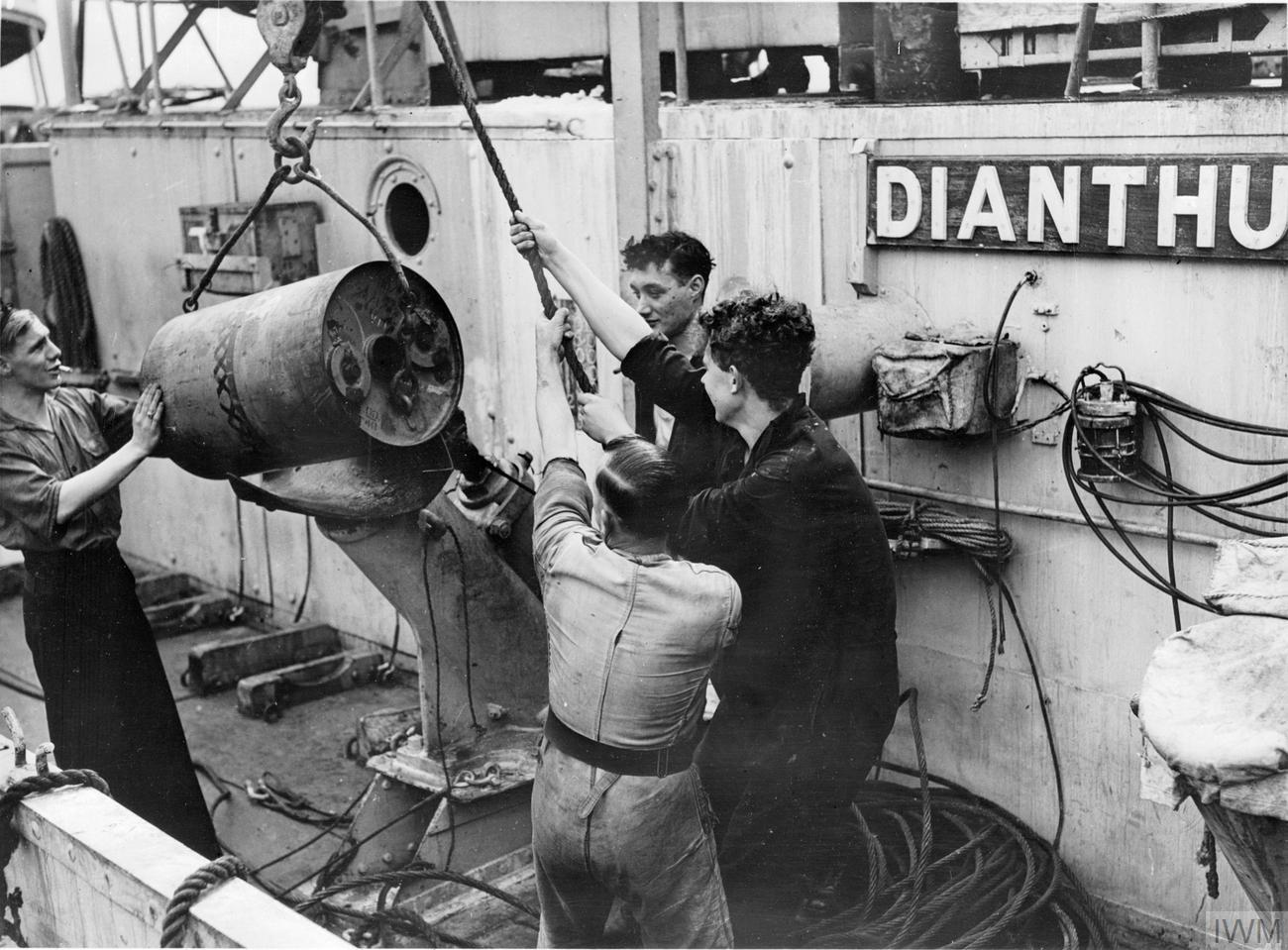
- A depth charge being loaded onto a depth-charge thrower aboard the corvette HMS Dianthus
| Date | 20–25 February 1943 |
| Location | North Atlantic |
| Result | German tactical victory |

Belligerents
| United Kingdom; United States; Canada; Poland | Germany |

Commanders and leaders
| CAPT W E B Magee RN; CAPT P.R. Heineman USN | Admiral Karl Dönitz |

Strength
| 63 freighters 1 destroyer 2 cutters 5 corvettes | 18 submarines |

Casualties and losses
| 14 freighters sunk (87,994 GRT); 262 killed/drowned | 3 submarines sunk 128 killed/drowned 11 captured |

Convoy ON 166 was the 166th of the numbered ON series of merchant ship convoys Outbound from the British Isles to North America. Sixty-three ships departed Liverpool 11 February 1943 and were met the following day by Mid-Ocean Escort Force Group A-3 consisting of the Treasury-class cutters Campbell and Spencer and the Flower-class corvettes Dianthus, Chilliwack, Rosthern, Trillium and Dauphin. The convoy suffered losses before arriving at New York City, US.

== Background ==
As western Atlantic coastal convoys brought an end to the Germans' "second happy time", Admiral Karl Dönitz, the Befehlshaber der U-Boote (BdU) or commander in chief of U-Boats, shifted focus to the mid-Atlantic to avoid aircraft patrols. Although convoy routing was less predictable in the mid-ocean, Dönitz anticipated that the increased numbers of U-boats being produced would be able to effectively search for convoys with the advantage of intelligence gained through B-Dienst decryption of British Naval Cypher Number 3. However, only 20 percent of the 180 trans-Atlantic convoys sailing from the end of July 1942 until the end of April 1943 lost ships to U-boat attack.

== 21 February ==
On 20 February U-604 sighted the convoy scattered by sailing eight days in a northwesterly gale. U-332 torpedoed the straggling Norwegian Stigstad on the morning of 21 February. U-623 was sunk by a No. 120 Squadron RAF B-24 Liberator that afternoon, and Campbell sank a U-boat that evening. Postwar analysis concluded that Campbell sank U-225, but later re-evaluation indicated that the attack may have destroyed U-529.

U-92 torpedoed the British Empire Trader at 2032 and the Norwegian NT Nielsen Alonso at 0153 on the night of February 21–22. Both ships were hit by a single torpedo on the port side, flooding the forward hold, and boiler room, respectively. ORP Burza from the following convoy ONS 167 was ordered to reinforce the convoy escort.

== 22 February ==
U-606 torpedoed the British Empire Redshank and American Chattanooga City and Expositor after sunset 22 February, but was damaged by depth charges from the recently arrived Burza. Campbell was disabled in a collision with U-606. Twelve men were rescued from the crew of the sinking U-boat. Burza left the convoy to tow Campbell back to port. The convoy rescue ship Stockport was sunk by U-604 while returning to the convoy after rescuing men from the three ships torpedoed by U-606.

== 23 February ==
U-628 torpedoed the Panamanian Winkler at 0420 and Norwegian Glittre at 0425. U-186 torpedoed the American Hastings about 0430 and British Eulima at 0458 on 23 February. Spencer, Rosthern and Chilliwack remained with the convoy and Dianthus left to refuel.

== 24 February ==
U-600 torpedoed the Norwegian Ingria at 0520 before dawn on 24 February. U-653 torpedoed the straggling American Liberty ship Jonathan Sturges.

== 25 February ==
U-628 hit the British Manchester Merchant with two torpedoes on the starboard side at 0527 before dawn 25 February.

== Aftermath ==
The U-boats discontinued the attack on 26 February. The surviving ships in the convoy were joined by Empire Cavalier from Halifax, Nova Scotia on 28 February with escorts New Westminster, Blairmore and Rimouski. They reached New York City on 3 March 1943.

== Ships in convoy ==
| Name | Flag | Dead | Tonnage | Cargo | Notes |
|---|---|---|---|---|---|
| Amastra (1935) | (United Kingdom) | | 8,031 gross register tons (GRT) | | |
| Aruba (1929) | (Netherlands) | | 3,979 GRT | general cargo | |
| Beauregard (1920) | (United States) | | 5,976 GRT | | returned to England |
| Brasil (1935) | (Norway) | | 8,130 GRT | | |
| Charles H Cramp (1920) | (United States) | | 6,220 GRT | | straggled 1 March |
| Chattanooga City (1921) | (United States) | 0 | 5,687 GRT | (in ballast) | sunk by U-606 22 Feb |
| City of Canberra (1927) | (United Kingdom) | | 7,484 GRT | | carried convoy commodore Capt W E B Magee DSO RN |
| Delilian (1923) | (United Kingdom) | | 6,423 GRT | | |
| Edward Rutledge (1942) | (United States) | | 7,177 GRT | 16 passengers | Liberty ship; returned to England |
| El Almirante (1917) | (Panama) | | 5,248 GRT | | returned to England |
| El Coston (1924) | (Panama) | | 7,286 GRT | | joined from Iceland 16 Feb but returned to Iceland when leaking condenser caused water shortage |
| El Oceano (1925) | (Panama) | | 6,767 GRT | | |
| Empire Cato (1942) | (United Kingdom) | | 7,039 GRT | | returned to England |
| Empire Cavalier (1942) | (United Kingdom) | | 9,891 GRT | | joined Halifax to New York; survived this convoy and convoy HX 229 |
| Empire Chivalry (1937) | (United Kingdom) | | 6,007 GRT | | |
| Empire Confidence (1935) | (United Kingdom) | | 5,023 GRT | | |
| Empire Redshank (1919) | (United Kingdom) | 0 | 6,615 GRT | (in ballast) | torpedoed by U-606 & scuttled by escort 22 Feb |
| Empire Trader (1908) | (United Kingdom) | 0 | 9,990 GRT | 985 tons chemicals | veteran of convoy HX 79; torpedoed by U-92 & scuttled by escort 23 Feb |
| Empire Wordsworth (1942) | (United Kingdom) | | 9,891 GRT | | |
| Eulima (1937) | (United Kingdom) | 63 | 6,207 GRT | (in ballast) | sunk by U-186 23 February |
| Exilona (1919) | (United States) | | 4,971 GRT | | |
| Expositor (1919) | (United States) | 6 | 4,959 GRT | (in ballast) | sunk by U-606 & U-303 |
| Fort Thompson (1942) | (United Kingdom) | | 7,134 GRT | coal | |
| Fort Vermillion (1942) | (United Kingdom) | | 7,133 GRT | | |
| Franz Klasen (1932) | (Panama) | | 1,194 GRT | | |
| Gateway City (1920) | (United States) | | 5,432 GRT | | veteran of convoy PQ 18 |
| George W McKnight (1933) | (United Kingdom) | | 2,502 GRT | | |
| Glittre (1928) | (Norway) | 3 | 6,402 GRT | (in ballast) | veteran of convoy ON 67; acting as escort oiler; sunk by U-628 & U-603 23 Feb |
| Gyda (1934) | (United Kingdom) | | 1,695 GRT | general cargo | straggled and lost following 24 Feb collision with Fort Thompson |
| Hastings (1920) | (United States) | 9 | 5,401 GRT | (in ballast) | sunk by U-186 23 Feb |
| Ingria (1931) | (Norway) | 0 | 4,391 GRT | (in ballast) | sunk by U-600 & U-628 24 Feb |
| Jonathan Sturges (1942) | (United States) | 56 | 7,176 GRT | (in ballast) | Liberty ship straggled & sunk by U-653 24 Feb |
| Kaipaki (1939) | (United Kingdom) | | 5,862 GRT | | |
| Lechistan (1929) | (Poland) | | 1,937 GRT | general cargo | straggled 20 Feb |
| Lochmonar (1924) | (United Kingdom) | | 9,412 GRT | 28 passengers | ship's master was convoy vice commodore |
| Madoera (1922) | (Netherlands) | | 9,382 GRT | | straggled 24 Feb & damaged by U-653 |
| Manchester Merchant (1940) | (United Kingdom) | 36 | 7,264 GRT | (in ballast) | sunk by U-628 25 Feb |
| Mark Twain (1942) | (United States) | | 7,176 GRT | | Liberty ship straggled with steering failure |
| Markay (1942) | (United States) | | 10,342 GRT | | joined from Iceland 16 Feb; romped 23 Feb |
| Molda (1937) | (Norway) | | 5,137 GRT | general cargo | |
| N T Nielsen-Alonso (1900) | (Norway) | 3 | 9,348 GRT | (in ballast) | sunk by U-92 & U-753 22 Feb |
| Pacific Exporter (1928) | (United Kingdom) | | 6,734 GRT | | |
| Pacific Grove (1928) | (United Kingdom) | | 7,117 GRT | | |
| Pan-Maine (1936) | (United States) | | 7,237 GRT | | |
| Pan-Maryland (1938) | (United States) | | 7,701 GRT | | |
| Samuel Chase (1942) | (United States) | | 7,191 GRT | | Liberty ship veteran of convoy PQ 17 |
| Skandinavia (1940) | (Norway) | | 10,044 GRT | | veteran of convoy ON 67 |
| Stigstad (1927) | (Norway) | 3 | 5,964 GRT | (in ballast) | straggled & sunk by U-332 & U-603 21 Feb |
| Stockport (1911) | (United Kingdom) | 63 | 1,683 GRT | (rescued crewmen of sunken ships) | rescue ship; sunk by U-604 while rescuing survivors |
| Tai Shan (1929) | (Norway) | | 6,962 GRT | 12 passengers | |
| Thomas B Robertson (1942) | (United States) | | 7,176 GRT | | Liberty ship romped & arrived New York 28 Feb |
| Thomas Hooker (1942) | (United States) | | 7,176 GRT | | Liberty ship returned to England |
| Tortuguero (1921) | (United Kingdom) | | 5,285 GRT | | |
| Tropic Star (1926) | (Norway) | | 5,088 GRT | | |
| Wind Rush (1918) | (United States) | | 5,586 GRT | | |
| Winkler (1930) | (Panama) | 20 | 6,907 GRT | (in ballast) | sunk by U-628 & U-223 23 Feb |

== See also ==
- Convoy Battles of World War II

== Bibliography ==
- Hague, Arnold (2000). The Allied Convoy System 1939–1945. Naval Institute Press. ISBN 1-55750-019-3.
- Morison, Samuel Eliot (1975). History of United States Naval Operations in World War II, Volume I The Battle of the Atlantic 1939–1943. Little, Brown and Company.
- Rohwer, J.; Hummelchen, G. (1992). Chronology of the War at Sea 1939–1945. Naval Institute Press. ISBN 1-55750-105-X.
- Tarrant, V.E. (1989). The U-Boat Offensive 1914–1945. Arms and Armour. ISBN 1-85409-520-X.
