= German submarine U-653 =

German World War II submarine

History

Nazi Germany
- Name: U-653
- Ordered: 9 October 1939
- Builder: Howaldtswerke, Hamburg
- Yard number: 802
- Laid down: 9 April 1940
- Launched: 22 March 1941
- Commissioned: 25 May 1941
- Fate: Sunk on 15 March 1944

General characteristics
- Class & type: Type VIIC submarine
- Displacement: 769 tonnes (757 long tons) surfaced; 871 t (857 long tons) submerged
- Length: 67.10 m (220 ft 2 in) o/a; 50.50 m (165 ft 8 in) pressure hull
- Beam: 6.20 m (20 ft 4 in) o/a; 4.70 m (15 ft 5 in) pressure hull
- Height: 9.60 m (31 ft 6 in)
- Draught: 4.74 m (15 ft 7 in)
- Installed power: 2,800–3,200 PS (2,100–2,400 kW; 2,800–3,200 bhp) (diesels); 750 PS (550 kW; 740 shp) (electric)
- Propulsion: 2 shafts; 2 × diesel engines; 2 × electric motors
- Speed: 17.7 knots (32.8 km/h; 20.4 mph) surfaced; 7.6 knots (14.1 km/h; 8.7 mph) submerged
- Range: 8,500 nmi (15,700 km; 9,800 mi) at 10 knots (19 km/h; 12 mph) surfaced; 80 nmi (150 km; 92 mi) at 4 knots (7.4 km/h; 4.6 mph) submerged
- Test depth: 230 m (750 ft); Crush depth: 250–295 m (820–968 ft)
- Complement: 4 officers, 40–56 enlisted
- Armament: 5 × 53.3 cm (21 in) torpedo tubes (four bow, one stern); 14 × torpedoes or 26 TMA mines; 1 × 8.8 cm (3.46 in) deck gun (220 rounds); 1 x 2 cm (0.79 in) C/30 AA gun

Service record
- Part of: 1st U-boat Flotilla; 25 May 1941 – 15 March 1944
- Identification codes: M 44 257
- Commanders: Kptlt. Gerhard Feiler; 25 May 1941 – 30 September 1943; Oblt.z.S. Hans-Albrecht Kandler; 1 October 1943 – 15 March 1944
- Operations: 9 patrols: 1st patrol: 13 December 1941 – 13 January 1942; 2nd patrol: 31 January – 30 March 1942; 3rd patrol: 25 April – 6 July 1942; 4th patrol: 5 – 31 August 1942; 5th patrol: 27 October – 29 December 1942; 6th patrol: 28 January – 31 March 1943; 7th patrol: a. 10 June – 11 September 1943; b. 15 – 16 November 1943; 8th patrol: 21 November 1943 – 13 January 1944; 9th patrol: 2 – 15 March 1944
- Victories: 3 merchant ships sunk (14,983 GRT); 1 warship sunk (840 tons); 1 merchant ship damaged (9,382 GRT)

German submarine U-653 was a Type VIIC U-boat built for Nazi Germany's Kriegsmarine for service during World War II. She was laid down on 9 April 1940 by Howaldtswerke, Hamburg as yard number 802, launched on 22 March 1941 and commissioned on 25 May 1941 under Kapitänleutnant Gerhard Feiler.

== Design ==
German Type VIIC submarines were preceded by the shorter Type VIIB submarines. U-653 had a displacement of 769 tonnes (757 long tons) when at the surface and 871 tonnes (857 long tons) while submerged. She had a total length of 67.10 m (220 ft 2 in), a pressure hull length of 50.50 m (165 ft 8 in), a beam of 6.20 m (20 ft 4 in), a height of 9.60 m (31 ft 6 in), and a draught of 4.74 m (15 ft 7 in). The submarine was powered by two Germaniawerft F46 four-stroke, six-cylinder supercharged diesel engines producing a total of 2,800 to 3,200 metric horsepower (2,060 to 2,350 kW; 2,760 to 3,160 shp) for use while surfaced, two Siemens-Schuckert GU 343/38–8 double-acting electric motors producing a total of 750 metric horsepower (550 kW; 740 shp) for use while submerged. She had two shafts and two 1.23 m (4 ft) propellers. The boat was capable of operating at depths of up to 230 metres (750 ft).

The submarine had a maximum surface speed of 17.7 knots (32.8 km/h; 20.4 mph) and a maximum submerged speed of 7.6 knots (14.1 km/h; 8.7 mph). When submerged, the boat could operate for 80 nautical miles (150 km; 92 mi) at 4 knots (7.4 km/h; 4.6 mph); when surfaced, she could travel 8,500 nautical miles (15,700 km; 9,800 mi) at 10 knots (19 km/h; 12 mph). U-653 was fitted with five 53.3 cm (21 in) torpedo tubes (four fitted at the bow and one at the stern), fourteen torpedoes, one 8.8 cm (3.46 in) SK C/35 naval gun, 220 rounds, and a 2 cm (0.79 in) C/30 anti-aircraft gun. The boat had a complement of between forty-four and sixty.

== Service history ==
The boat's career began with training at 1st U-boat Flotilla on 25 May 1941, followed by active service on 1 December 1941 as part of the 1st Flotilla for the remainder of her service.

In nine patrols she sank three merchant ships, for a total of 14,983 gross register tons (GRT), and one warship of 840 tons.

=== Convoy ON 166 ===
In a determined attack, between 22:00 on 23 February 1943 and daybreak the following morning, U-653, together with U-92, U-600 and U-628, came in one after the other against Convoy ON 166.

U-653 fired seven torpedoes at, and missed, the British freighter Delilian, but succeeded in striking the 9,382-GRT Dutch motor vessel Madoera. Against the odds, Madoera stayed afloat and reached St. John's seven days later, but not before some of her crew had abandoned ship and made for the lifeboats. This resulted in the Dutch ship's chief officer being captured by U-591.

=== Fate ===
U-653 was sunk on 15 March 1944 in the North Atlantic in position 53°46′N 24°35′W, by depth charges from Fleet Air Arm Swordfish, HMS Starling and HMS Wild Goose. All hands were lost.

=== Wolfpacks ===
U-653 took part in 16 wolfpacks, namely:

- Pfadfinder (21 – 27 May 1942)
- Blücher (14 – 18 August 1942)
- Natter (2 – 8 November 1942)
- Westwall (8 November – 16 December 1942)
- Hartherz (3 – 7 February 1943)
- Ritter (11 – 26 February 1943)
- Burggraf (4 – 5 March 1943)
- Raubgraf (7 – 15 March 1943)
- Coronel (4 – 8 December 1943)
- Coronel 1 (8 – 14 December 1943)
- Coronel 2 (14 – 17 December 1943)
- Föhr (18 – 23 December 1943)
- Rügen 6 (23 – 28 December 1943)
- Rügen 7 (28 December 1943 – 2 January 1944)
- Rügen 6 (2 – 5 January 1944)
- Preussen (4 – 15 March 1944)

== Summary of raiding history ==
Date	Ship Name	Nationality	Tonnage (Note: Merchant ship tonnages are in gross register tons. Military vessels are listed by tons displacement.)	Fate
28 February 1942	Leif	Norway	1,582	Sunk
17 May 1942	Peisander	United Kingdom	6,225	Sunk
7 June 1942	USS Gannet	United States Navy	840	Sunk
24 February 1943	Madoera	Netherlands	9,382	Damaged
12 March 1943	Thomas Hooker	United States	7,176	Sunk

== Bibliography ==
- Busch, Rainer; Röll, Hans-Joachim (1999). German U-boat commanders of World War II : a biographical dictionary. Translated by Brooks, Geoffrey. London, Annapolis, Md: Greenhill Books, Naval Institute Press. ISBN 1-55750-186-6.
- Busch, Rainer; Röll, Hans-Joachim (1999). Der U-Boot-Krieg, 1939-1945: Deutsche U-Boot-Verluste von September 1939 bis Mai 1945 [German U-boat losses from September 1939 to May 1945] (in German). Vol. IV. Hamburg, Berlin, Bonn: Mittler. ISBN 3-8132-0514-2.
- Edwards, Bernard (1996). Dönitz and the Wolf Packs - The U-boats at War. Cassell. pp. 105–107, 117, 123, 124, 189. ISBN 0-304-35203-9.
- Gröner, Eric; Jung, Dieter; Maass, Martin (1991). German Warships 1815-1945: U-boats and Mine Warfare Vessels. Vol. 2. Translated by Thomas, Keith; Magowan, Rachel. London: Conway Maritime Press. ISBN 0-85177-593-4.
- Sharpe, Peter (1998). U-Boat Fact File, 1935-1945. Great Britain: Midland Publishing. ISBN 1-85780-072-9.
