= MV British Cavalier =

Tanker built 1942

History
- Name: Empire Cavalier (1942–45); British Cavalier (1945–59)
- Owner: Ministry of War Transport (1942–45); British Tanker Co Ltd (1948–59)
- Operator: Mingo Campbell & Co Ltd (1942–45); British Tanker Co Ltd (1948–59)
- Port of registry: (United Kingdom) Sunderland (1942–45); (United Kingdom) UK (1945–59)
- Builder: Sir J Laing & Sons Ltd
- Launched: 27 August 1942
- Completed: November 1942
- Out of service: November 1957 – May 1959
- Identification: Code Letters BFCF; UK Official Number 169033
- Fate: Scrapped 1959.

General characteristics
- Tonnage: 9,891 GRT; 5,912 NRT
- Length: 482 ft 7 in (147.09 m)
- Beam: 68 ft 3 in (20.80 m)
- Depth: 36 ft 1 in (11.00 m)
- Installed power: 4SCSA diesel engine
- Propulsion: Screw propeller

British Cavalier was a 9,891 GRT tanker that was built in 1942 for the Ministry of War Transport (MoWT) as Empire Cavalier. In 1945, she was sold to the British Tanker Co Ltd and renamed British Cavalier, serving until 1959 when she was scrapped.

== Description ==
The ship was built by Sir J Laing & Sons Ltd, Sunderland. She was launched on 27 August 1942 and completed in November.

The ship was 482 feet 7 inches (147.09 m) long, with a beam of 68 feet 3 inches (20.80 m) and a depth of 36 feet 1 inch (11.00 m). She had a GRT of 9,891 and a NRT of 5,912.

She was propelled by a 4-stroke Single Cycle Single Action diesel engine which had eight cylinders 25 9/16 inches (64.9 cm) diameter by 55 1/8 inches (140 cm) stroke. The engine was built by Hawthorn, Leslie & Co Ltd, Newcastle upon Tyne.

== History ==
Empire Castle was built for the MoWT. She was placed under the management of Mungo Campbell & Co Ltd. She was allocated the United Kingdom Official Number 169033. The Code Letters BFCF were allocated and her port of registry was Sunderland.

Empire Cavalier was a member of a number of convoys during the Second World War.

ON 166

Convoy ON 166 departed Liverpool on 11 February 1943 and arrived at New York on 3 March. Empire Cavalier joined the convoy at sea, having departed from Halifax, Nova Scotia.

HX 229

Convoy HX 229 departed New York on 8 March 1943 and arrived at Liverpool on 23 March. Empire Cavalier was carrying a cargo of aviation fuel.

HX 313

Convoy HX 313 departed New York on 10 October 1944 and arrived at Liverpool on 24 October. Empire Cavalier was bound for Thameshaven.

In 1945, Empire Cavalier was sold to the British Tanker Co Ltd and renamed British Cavalier. She served until 1957, and was laid up on 13 November at Swansea. On 23 May 1959, she arrived at Briton Ferry for scrapping.
