= German submarine U-664 =

German World War II submarine

History

Nazi Germany
- Name: U-664
- Ordered: 15 August 1940
- Builder: Howaldtswerke, Hamburg
- Yard number: 813
- Laid down: 11 July 1941
- Launched: 28 April 1942
- Commissioned: 17 June 1942
- Fate: Sunk on 9 August 1943

General characteristics
- Class & type: Type VIIC submarine
- Displacement: 769 tonnes (757 long tons) surfaced; 871 t (857 long tons) submerged
- Length: 67.10 m (220 ft 2 in) o/a; 50.50 m (165 ft 8 in) pressure hull
- Beam: 6.20 m (20 ft 4 in) o/a; 4.70 m (15 ft 5 in) pressure hull
- Height: 9.60 m (31 ft 6 in)
- Draught: 4.74 m (15 ft 7 in)
- Installed power: 2,800–3,200 PS (2,100–2,400 kW; 2,800–3,200 bhp) (diesels); 750 PS (550 kW; 740 shp) (electric)
- Propulsion: 2 shafts; 2 × diesel engines; 2 × electric motors
- Speed: 17.7 knots (32.8 km/h; 20.4 mph) surfaced; 7.6 knots (14.1 km/h; 8.7 mph) submerged
- Range: 8,500 nmi (15,700 km; 9,800 mi) at 10 knots (19 km/h; 12 mph) surfaced; 80 nmi (150 km; 92 mi) at 4 knots (7.4 km/h; 4.6 mph) submerged
- Test depth: 230 m (750 ft); Crush depth: 250–295 m (820–968 ft)
- Complement: 4 officers, 40-56 ratings
- Armament: 5 × 53.3 cm (21 in) torpedo tubes (four bow, one stern); 14 × torpedoes; 1 × 8.8 cm (3.46 in) deck gun (220 rounds); 1 x 2 cm (0.79 in) C/30 AA gun

Service record
- Part of: 8th U-boat Flotilla; 17 June – 31 October 1942; 9th U-boat Flotilla; 1 November 1942 – 9 August 1943
- Identification codes: M 05 024
- Commanders: Oblt.z.S. Adolf Graef; 17 June 1942 – 9 August 1943
- Operations: 5 patrols: 1st patrol: 20 October – 10 November 1942; 2nd patrol: 5 December 1942 – 13 January 1943; 3rd patrol: 14 February – 28 March 1943; 4th patrol: 29 April – 9 June 1943; 5th patrol: 21 July – 9 August 1943
- Victories: 3 merchant ships sunk (19,325 GRT)

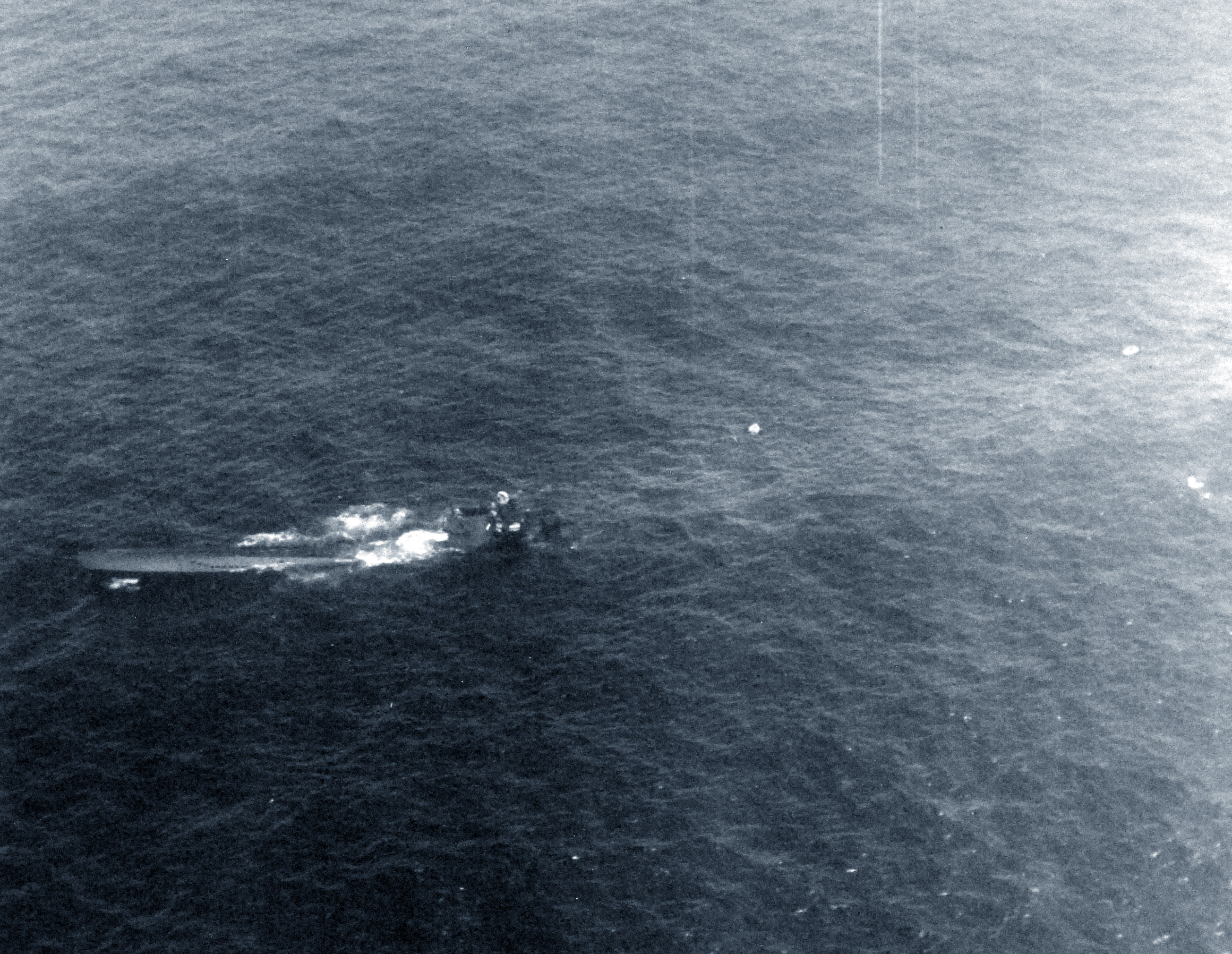
German submarine U-664

German submarine U-664 was a Type VIIC U-boat built for Nazi Germany's Kriegsmarine for service during World War II. She was laid down on 11 July 1941 by Howaldtswerke, Hamburg as yard number 813, launched on 28 April 1942 and commissioned on 17 June 1942 under Oberleutnant zur See Adolf Graef.

== Design ==
German Type VIIC submarines were preceded by the shorter Type VIIB submarines. U-664 had a displacement of 769 tonnes (757 long tons) when at the surface and 871 tonnes (857 long tons) while submerged. She had a total length of 67.10 m (220 ft 2 in), a pressure hull length of 50.50 m (165 ft 8 in), a beam of 6.20 m (20 ft 4 in), a height of 9.60 m (31 ft 6 in), and a draught of 4.74 m (15 ft 7 in). The submarine was powered by two Germaniawerft F46 four-stroke, six-cylinder supercharged diesel engines producing a total of 2,800 to 3,200 metric horsepower (2,060 to 2,350 kW; 2,760 to 3,160 shp) for use while surfaced, two Siemens-Schuckert GU 343/38–8 double-acting electric motors producing a total of 750 metric horsepower (550 kW; 740 shp) for use while submerged. She had two shafts and two 1.23 m (4 ft) propellers. The boat was capable of operating at depths of up to 230 metres (750 ft).

The submarine had a maximum surface speed of 17.7 knots (32.8 km/h; 20.4 mph) and a maximum submerged speed of 7.6 knots (14.1 km/h; 8.7 mph). When submerged, the boat could operate for 80 nautical miles (150 km; 92 mi) at 4 knots (7.4 km/h; 4.6 mph); when surfaced, she could travel 8,500 nautical miles (15,700 km; 9,800 mi) at 10 knots (19 km/h; 12 mph). U-664 was fitted with five 53.3 cm (21 in) torpedo tubes (four fitted at the bow and one at the stern), fourteen torpedoes, one 8.8 cm (3.46 in) SK C/35 naval gun, 220 rounds, and a 2 cm (0.79 in) C/30 anti-aircraft gun. The boat had a complement of between forty-four and sixty.

== Service history ==
The boat's career began with training at 8th U-boat Flotilla on 17 June 1942, followed by active service on 1 November 1942 as part of the 9th Flotilla for the remainder of her service.

In five patrols she sank three merchant ships, for a total of 19,325 gross register tons (GRT).

=== First Patrol ===
On her first day of active service she was attacked by a US Catalina. The depth charge attack was so effective that she had to return to base in France.

=== Convoy ONS 167 ===
Outward bound from Biscay on her second patrol, U-664 made a chance sighting of the slow convoy and radioed its position to base. Karl Dönitz ordered Graef to shadow the convoy while other boats were rounded up to form Wolfpack Sturmbock. However the boats were well scattered and failed to make contact with the convoy, so on the night of 21 February 1943, Graef became impatient with waiting and decided to attack alone.

With one spread of torpedoes, Graef sank the 4,659 GRT American steamer Rosario and the 8,807 GRT Panamanian tanker H H Rogers.

=== Wolfpacks ===
U-664 took part in eight wolfpacks, namely:

- Raufbold (11 – 22 December 1942)
- Spitz (22 – 31 December 1942)
- Sturmbock (21 – 26 February 1943)
- Wildfang (26 February – 5 March 1943)
- Raubgraf (7 – 20 March 1943)
- Without name (5 – 10 May 1943)
- Lech (10 – 15 May 1943)
- Donau 2 (15 – 26 May 1943)

=== Fate ===
On 8 August 1943 U-664 fired three torpedoes at the escort carrier USS Card in a surprise attack, before USS Card was able to respond and forced her to dive. The following day, on 9 August 1943, U-664 was sunk in the North Atlantic in position 40°12′N 37°29′W, by depth charges from USN Grumman Avenger aircraft launched from the carrier. Seven crew members were killed and 44 rescued by USS Borie after seven hours in the water.

== Summary of raiding history ==
Date	Ship Name	Nationality	Tonnage (GRT)	Fate
16 December 1942	Emile Francqui	Belgium	5,859	Sunk
21 February 1943	H H Rogers	Panama	8,807	Sunk
21 February 1943	Rosario	United States	4,659	Sunk

== Bibliography ==
- Busch, Rainer; Röll, Hans-Joachim (1999). German U-boat commanders of World War II : a biographical dictionary. Translated by Brooks, Geoffrey. London, Annapolis, Md: Greenhill Books, Naval Institute Press. ISBN 1-55750-186-6.
- Busch, Rainer; Röll, Hans-Joachim (1999). Der U-Boot-Krieg, 1939-1945: Deutsche U-Boot-Verluste von September 1939 bis Mai 1945 [German U-boat losses from September 1939 to May 1945] (in German). Vol. IV. Hamburg, Berlin, Bonn: Mittler. ISBN 3-8132-0514-2.
- Gröner, Eric; Jung, Dieter; Maass, Martin (1991). German Warships 1815-1945: U-boats and Mine Warfare Vessels. Vol. 2. Translated by Thomas, Keith; Magowan, Rachel. London: Conway Maritime Press. ISBN 0-85177-593-4.
- Sharpe, Peter (1998). U-Boat Fact File. Great Britain: Midland Publishing. ISBN 1-85780-072-9.
