= HMS Erica =

Flower-class corvette

History

United Kingdom
- Name: Erica
- Namesake: Erica
- Ordered: 19 Sep 1939
- Builder: Harland and Wolff, Belfast, Northern Ireland
- Laid down: 22 Feb 1940
- Launched: 18 Jun 1940
- Commissioned: 9 Aug 1940
- Identification: Pennant number: K50
- Fate: Sunk by mine, 9 Feb 1943

General characteristics
- Class & type: Flower-class corvette
- Displacement: 925 long tons
- Length: 205 ft (62 m) o/a
- Beam: 33 ft (10 m)
- Draught: 11 ft 6 in (3.51 m)
- Propulsion: 1 × 4-cycle triple-expansion reciprocating steam engine; 2 × fire tube Scotch boilers; Single shaft; 2,750 ihp (2,050 kW)
- Speed: 16 kn (30 km/h)
- Range: 3,500 nmi (6,500 km) at 12 kn (22 km/h)
- Complement: 85
- Sensors & processing systems: 1 × SW1C or 2C radar; 1 × Type 123A or Type 127DV sonar
- Armament: 1 × BL 4-inch (101.6 mm) Mk.IX gun; 2 × Vickers .50 cal machine gun (twin); 2 × Lewis .303 cal machine gun (twin); 2 × Mk.II Depth charge throwers; 2 × Depth charge rails with 40 depth charges

HMS Erica was a Flower-class corvette that served in the Royal Navy and was built by Harland and Wolff in 1941. She was named after Erica. Commissioned in 1940 and sunk by a mine on 9 February 1943.

== Design and description ==
In early 1939, with the risk of war with Nazi Germany increasing, it was clear to the Royal Navy that it needed more escort ships to counter the threat from Kriegsmarine U-boats. One particular concern was the need to protect shipping off the east coast of Britain. What was needed was something larger and faster than trawlers, but still cheap enough to be built in large numbers, preferably at small merchant shipyards, as larger yards were already busy. To meet this requirement, the Smiths Dock Company of Middlesbrough, a specialist in the design and build of fishing vessels, offered a development of its 700-ton, 16 knots (18 mph; 30 km/h) whale catcher Southern Pride. They were intended as small convoy escort ships that could be produced quickly and cheaply in large numbers. Despite naval planners' intentions that they be deployed for coastal convoys, their long range meant that they became the mainstay of Mid-Ocean Escort Force convoy protection during the first half of the war. The original Flowers had the standard RN layout, consisting of a raised forecastle, a well deck, then the bridge or wheelhouse, and a continuous deck running aft. The crew quarters were in the foc'sle while the galley was at the rear, making for poor messing arrangements.

The modified Flowers saw the forecastle extended aft past the bridge to the aft end of the funnel, a variation known as the "long forecastle" design. Apart from providing a very useful space where the whole crew could gather out of the weather, the added weight improved the ships' stability and speed and was retroactively applied to a number of the original Flower-class vessels during the mid and latter years of the war.

== Construction and career ==
Erica was laid down by Harland and Wolff at their shipyard at Belfast, on 22 February 1940 and launched on 18 June 1940. She was commissioned on 9 August 1940.

On 9 February 1943 a convoy of five empty merchant ships sailed from Benghazi at 0200 hours for Tobruk and Alexandria under escort by the corvette HMS Erica, the armed trawlers HMS Burra and HMSAS Southern Maid and two M.Ls. At 1550 hours, in position 32°48'5 N, 21°06E, off Derna, Libya, HMS Erica, who was investigating an A/S contact, struck a mine and sank. It was at first thought to have been a torpedo but ML's from Tobruk and Benghazi carried out an A/S search of the area but without result, and from subsequent investigation it is evident that she struck a mine in a field laid by HMS Rorqual some time ago. HMSAS Southern Maid picked up all officers and seventy-one ratings. Casualties were one rating missing and another who died of wounds.
