= German submarine U-186 =

German World War II submarine

Coordinates: 41°54′N 31°49′W

History

Nazi Germany
- Name: U-186
- Ordered: 15 August 1940
- Builder: DeSchiMAG AG Weser, Bremen
- Yard number: 1026
- Laid down: 24 July 1941
- Launched: 11 March 1942
- Commissioned: 10 July 1942
- Fate: Sunk, 12 May 1943

General characteristics
- Class & type: Type IXC/40 submarine
- Displacement: 1,144 t (1,126 long tons) surfaced; 1,257 t (1,237 long tons) submerged
- Length: 76.76 m (251 ft 10 in) o/a; 58.75 m (192 ft 9 in) pressure hull
- Beam: 6.86 m (22 ft 6 in) o/a; 4.44 m (14 ft 7 in) pressure hull
- Height: 9.60 m (31 ft 6 in)
- Draught: 4.67 m (15 ft 4 in)
- Installed power: 4,400 PS (3,200 kW; 4,300 bhp) (diesels); 1,000 PS (740 kW; 990 shp) (electric)
- Propulsion: 2 shafts; 2 × diesel engines; 2 × electric motors
- Speed: 18.3 knots (33.9 km/h; 21.1 mph) surfaced; 7.3 knots (13.5 km/h; 8.4 mph) submerged
- Range: 13,850 nmi (25,650 km; 15,940 mi) at 10 knots (19 km/h; 12 mph) surfaced; 63 nmi (117 km; 72 mi) at 4 knots (7.4 km/h; 4.6 mph) submerged
- Test depth: 230 m (750 ft)
- Complement: 4 officers, 44 enlisted
- Armament: 6 × torpedo tubes (4 bow, 2 stern); 22 × 53.3 cm (21 in) torpedoes; 1 × 10.5 cm (4.1 in) SK C/32 deck gun (180 rounds); 1 × 3.7 cm (1.5 in) SK C/30 AA gun; 1 × twin 2 cm FlaK 30 AA guns

Service record
- Part of: 4th U-boat Flotilla; 10 July – 31 December 1942; 10th U-boat Flotilla; 1 January – 12 May 1943
- Identification codes: M 05 693
- Commanders: K.Kapt. Siegfried Hesemann; 10 July 1942 – 12 May 1943
- Operations: 2 patrols: 1st patrol: 31 December 1942 – 5 March 1943; 2nd patrol: 17 April – 12 May 1943
- Victories: 3 merchant ships sunk (18,782 GRT)

German submarine U-186 was a Type IXC/40 U-boat of Nazi Germany's Kriegsmarine built for service during World War II. Her keel was laid down on 24 July 1941 by DeSchiMAG AG Weser in Bremen as yard number 1026. She was launched on 11 March 1942 and commissioned on 10 July with Korvettenkapitän Siegfried Hesemann in command.

The U-boat's service began with training as part of the 4th U-boat Flotilla. She then moved to the 10th flotilla on 1 January 1943 for operations. The submarine carried out two patrols and was a member of nine wolfpacks. She sank three ships totalling 18,782 gross register tons (GRT).

She was sunk by a British destroyer on 12 May 1943.

== Design ==
German Type IXC/40 submarines were slightly larger than the original Type IXCs. U-186 had a displacement of 1,144 tonnes (1,126 long tons) when at the surface and 1,257 tonnes (1,237 long tons) while submerged. The U-boat had a total length of 76.76 m (251 ft 10 in), a pressure hull length of 58.75 m (192 ft 9 in), a beam of 6.86 m (22 ft 6 in), a height of 9.60 m (31 ft 6 in), and a draught of 4.67 m (15 ft 4 in). The submarine was powered by two MAN M 9 V 40/46 supercharged four-stroke, nine-cylinder diesel engines producing a total of 4,400 metric horsepower (3,240 kW; 4,340 shp) for use while surfaced, two Siemens-Schuckert 2 GU 345/34 double-acting electric motors producing a total of 1,000 shaft horsepower (1,010 PS; 750 kW) for use while submerged. She had two shafts and two 1.92 m (6 ft) propellers. The boat was capable of operating at depths of up to 230 metres (750 ft).

The submarine had a maximum surface speed of 18.3 knots (33.9 km/h; 21.1 mph) and a maximum submerged speed of 7.3 knots (13.5 km/h; 8.4 mph). When submerged, the boat could operate for 63 nautical miles (117 km; 72 mi) at 4 knots (7.4 km/h; 4.6 mph); when surfaced, she could travel 13,850 nautical miles (25,650 km; 15,940 mi) at 10 knots (19 km/h; 12 mph). U-186 was fitted with six 53.3 cm (21 in) torpedo tubes (four fitted at the bow and two at the stern), 22 torpedoes, one 10.5 cm (4.13 in) SK C/32 naval gun, 180 rounds, and a 3.7 cm (1.5 in) SK C/30 as well as a 2 cm (0.79 in) C/30 anti-aircraft gun. The boat had a complement of forty-eight.

== Service history ==
=== First patrol ===
U-186's first patrol took her from Kiel, across the North Sea and into the Atlantic Ocean through the gap between Iceland and the Faroe Islands. She sank Ocean Vagabond on 11 January 1943 south of Iceland. This ship had already been damaged by U-513 in September 1942. U-186 also sank Hastings and Eulima on 23 February 1943 (part of Convoy ON 166) about 310 nmi (570 km; 360 mi) south of Cape Race (Newfoundland). She arrived at Lorient in occupied France, on 5 March 1943.

=== Second patrol and loss ===
The boat departed Lorient on 17 April 1943. On 12 May she was sunk northwest of the Azores by depth charges dropped by the British destroyer HMS Hesperus. Fifty three men died. There were no survivors.

=== Wolfpacks ===
U-186 took part in nine wolfpacks, namely:

- Habicht (10 – 19 January 1943)
- Haudegen (19 January - 2 February 1943)
- Nordsturm (2 – 9 February 1943)
- Haudegen (9 – 15 February 1943)
- Taifun (15 – 20 February 1943)
- Amsel (22 April - 3 May 1943)
- Amsel 4 (3 – 6 May 1943)
- Rhein (7 – 10 May 1943)
- Elbe 2 (10 – 12 May 1943)

== Summary of raiding history ==
| Date | Ship | Nationality | Tonnage (GRT) | Fate |
|---|---|---|---|---|
| 11 January 1943 | Ocean Vagabond | United Kingdom | 7,174 | Sunk |
| 23 February 1943 | Eulima | United Kingdom | 6,207 | Sunk |
| 23 February 1943 | Hastings | United States | 5,401 | Sunk |

== See also ==
- Donald Macintyre (Royal Navy officer)

== Bibliography ==
- Busch, Rainer; Röll, Hans-Joachim (1999). German U-boat commanders of World War II: a biographical dictionary. Translated by Brooks, Geoffrey. London, Annapolis, Md: Greenhill Books, Naval Institute Press. ISBN 1-55750-186-6.
- Busch, Rainer; Röll, Hans-Joachim (1999). Deutsche U-Boot-Verluste von September 1939 bis Mai 1945 [German U-boat losses from September 1939 to May 1945]. Der U-Boot-Krieg (in German). Vol. IV. Hamburg, Berlin, Bonn: Mittler. ISBN 3-8132-0514-2.
- Edwards, Bernard (1996). Dönitz and the Wolfpacks - The U-boats at War. Cassell Military Classics. pp. 160, 207, 211. ISBN 0-304-35203-9.
- Gröner, Erich; Jung, Dieter; Maass, Martin (1991). U-boats and Mine Warfare Vessels. German Warships 1815–1945. Vol. 2. Translated by Thomas, Keith; Magowan, Rachel. London: Conway Maritime Press. ISBN 0-85177-593-4.
- Kemp, Paul (1999). U-Boats Destroyed - German Submarine Losses in the World Wars. London: Arms & Armour. ISBN 1-85409-515-3.
