= HMT Lord Hailsham =

Royal Navy vessel

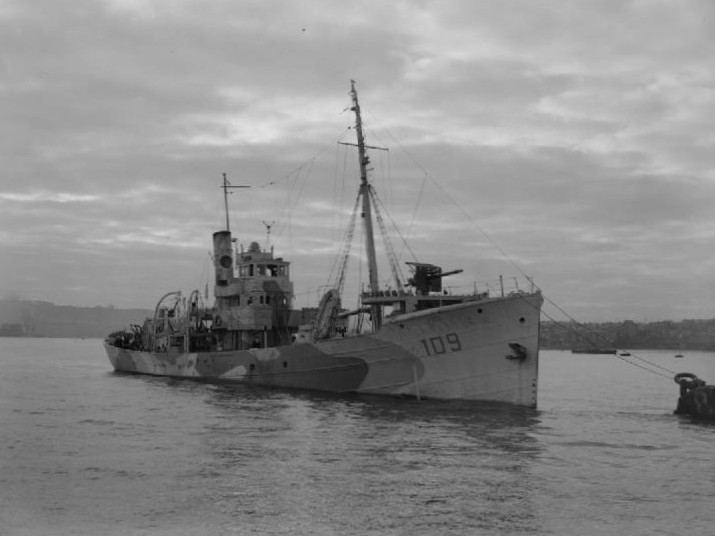

History

United Kingdom
- Name: HMT Lord Hailsham
- Namesake: Douglas Hogg, 1st Viscount Hailsham
- Builder: Cochrane & Sons Shipbuilders Ltd, Selby
- Launched: 30 June 1934
- Completed: August 1934
- Acquired: August 1939
- Commissioned: October 1939
- Fate: Sunk on 27 February 1943

General characteristics
- Type: Armed trawler
- Displacement: 445 tons
- Length: 156 feet (48 m)
- Sensors & processing systems: ASDIC
- Armament: 1 × 4-inch (100 mm) gun; 2 × 20 mm Oerlikon machine guns; 14 depth charges; 1 × Holman Projector (installed later)

HMT Lord Hailsham (FY109) was a Royal Navy vessel that saw service in the Second World War. The ship was named after Douglas Hogg, 1st Viscount Hailsham.

== Service history ==
Lord Hailsham was a trawler converted to be used in anti-submarine warfare. She had a 4-inch (100 mm) gun forward and 20 mm Oerlikon machine guns on the wings of the bridge, which could be used for anti-aircraft and anti-ship actions. She was also equipped with ASDIC anti-submarine sonar detection equipment, and carried up to 14 depth charges. Later on, she was equipped with a Holman Projector.

A crest of the Hailsham Family was given to the ship in 1942 at the request of First Lieutenant Reginald Mortimore, and was displayed on the front of the ship's bridge.

The ship saw action in the English Channel, and the Eastern Atlantic.

== Fate ==
Lord Hailsham was on convoy duty when she was sunk on 27 February 1943 in Lyme Bay by German E-boats. At the time she was one of five armed ships, led by the Hunt Class destroyer HMS Blencathra, escorting a convoy of eight merchant vessels from South Wales to Southampton. Four of the merchant ships were also lost in the action.

One of her crew, Seaman James Robert Beatty (Royal Naval Reserve), was Mentioned in Despatches due to his prompt action which helped to save lives when the ship was hit.
