= German submarine U-529 =

German World War II submarine

History

Nazi Germany
- Name: U-529
- Ordered: 15 August 1940
- Builder: Deutsche Werft AG, Hamburg
- Yard number: 344
- Laid down: 26 November 1941
- Launched: 15 July 1942
- Commissioned: 30 September 1942
- Fate: Sunk on 15 February 1943

General characteristics
- Class & type: Type IXC/40 submarine
- Displacement: 1,144 t (1,126 long tons) surfaced; 1,257 t (1,237 long tons) submerged
- Length: 76.76 m (251 ft 10 in) o/a; 58.75 m (192 ft 9 in) pressure hull
- Beam: 6.86 m (22 ft 6 in) o/a; 4.44 m (14 ft 7 in) pressure hull
- Height: 9.60 m (31 ft 6 in)
- Draught: 4.67 m (15 ft 4 in)
- Installed power: 4,400 PS (3,200 kW; 4,300 bhp) (diesels); 1,000 PS (740 kW; 990 shp) (electric)
- Propulsion: 2 shafts; 2 × diesel engines; 2 × electric motors
- Speed: 18.3 knots (33.9 km/h; 21.1 mph) surfaced; 7.3 knots (13.5 km/h; 8.4 mph) submerged
- Range: 13,850 nmi (25,650 km; 15,940 mi) at 10 knots (19 km/h; 12 mph) surfaced; 63 nmi (117 km; 72 mi) at 4 knots (7.4 km/h; 4.6 mph) submerged
- Test depth: 230 m (750 ft)
- Complement: 4 officers, 44 enlisted
- Armament: 6 × torpedo tubes (4 bow, 2 stern); 22 × 53.3 cm (21 in) torpedoes; 1 × 10.5 cm (4.1 in) SK C/32 deck gun (180 rounds); 1 × 3.7 cm (1.5 in) SK C/30 AA gun; 1 × twin 2 cm FlaK 30 AA guns

Service record
- Part of: 4th U-boat Flotilla; 30 September 1942 – 31 January 1943; 10th U-boat Flotilla; 1 – 15 February 1943
- Identification codes: M 50 148
- Commanders: Kptlt. Georg-Werner Fraatz; 30 September 1942 – 15 February 1943
- Operations: 1 patrol: 30 January – 15 February 1943
- Victories: None

German submarine U-529 was a Type IXC/40 U-boat of Nazi Germany's Kriegsmarine, built for service during World War II. The submarine was laid down on 26 November 1941 at the Deutsche Werft yard in Hamburg as yard number 344, launched on 15 July 1942, and commissioned on 30 September 1942 under the command of Kapitänleutnant Georg-Werner Fraatz. After training with the 4th U-boat Flotilla, U-529 was transferred to the 10th flotilla for front-line service on 1 February 1943.

== Design ==
German Type IXC/40 submarines were slightly larger than the original Type IXCs. U-529 had a displacement of 1,144 tonnes (1,126 long tons) when at the surface and 1,257 tonnes (1,237 long tons) while submerged. The U-boat had a total length of 76.76 m (251 ft 10 in), a pressure hull length of 58.75 m (192 ft 9 in), a beam of 6.86 m (22 ft 6 in), a height of 9.60 m (31 ft 6 in), and a draught of 4.67 m (15 ft 4 in). The submarine was powered by two MAN M 9 V 40/46 supercharged four-stroke, nine-cylinder diesel engines producing a total of 4,400 metric horsepower (3,240 kW; 4,340 shp) for use while surfaced, two Siemens-Schuckert 2 GU 345/34 double-acting electric motors producing a total of 1,000 shaft horsepower (1,010 PS; 750 kW) for use while submerged. She had two shafts and two 1.92 m (6 ft) propellers. The boat was capable of operating at depths of up to 230 metres (750 ft).

The submarine had a maximum surface speed of 18.3 knots (33.9 km/h; 21.1 mph) and a maximum submerged speed of 7.3 knots (13.5 km/h; 8.4 mph). When submerged, the boat could operate for 63 nautical miles (117 km; 72 mi) at 4 knots (7.4 km/h; 4.6 mph); when surfaced, she could travel 13,850 nautical miles (25,650 km; 15,940 mi) at 10 knots (19 km/h; 12 mph). U-529 was fitted with six 53.3 cm (21 in) torpedo tubes (four fitted at the bow and two at the stern), 22 torpedoes, one 10.5 cm (4.13 in) SK C/32 naval gun, 180 rounds, and a 3.7 cm (1.5 in) SK C/30 as well as a 2 cm (0.79 in) C/30 anti-aircraft gun. The boat had a complement of forty-eight.

== Service history ==
U-529 sailed from Kiel on her first and only war patrol on 30 January 1943. The U-boat was sunk with all hands on 15 February 1943 in the North Atlantic, in position 55°45′N 31°09′W, by depth charges from a British B-24 Liberator aircraft from No. 201 Squadron RAF. She was originally listed as missing, assumed lost at sea, as the Liberator attack of 15 February was believed to have sunk U-225.

=== Wolfpacks ===
U-529 took part in one wolfpack, namely:

- Ritter (11 – 12 February 1943)

== Bibliography ==
- Busch, Rainer; Röll, Hans-Joachim (1999). German U-boat commanders of World War II : a biographical dictionary. Translated by Brooks, Geoffrey. London, Annapolis, Md: Greenhill Books, Naval Institute Press. ISBN 1-55750-186-6.
- Gröner, Eric; Jung, Dieter; Maass, Martin (1991). German Warships 1815-1945: U-boats and Mine Warfare Vessels. Vol. 2. Translated by Thomas, Keith; Magowan, Rachel. London: Conway Maritime Press. ISBN 0-85177-593-4.
