= German submarine U-92 (1942) =

German World War II submarine

History

Nazi Germany
- Name: U-92
- Ordered: 25 January 1939
- Builder: Flender Werke, Lübeck
- Cost: 4,714,000 Reichsmark
- Yard number: 296
- Laid down: 25 November 1940
- Launched: 10 January 1942
- Commissioned: 3 March 1942
- Decommissioned: 12 October 1944
- Fate: Damaged by bombing, broken up in 1944 – 45

General characteristics
- Class & type: Type VIIC submarine
- Displacement: 769 tonnes (757 long tons) surfaced; 871 t (857 long tons) submerged
- Length: 67.10 m (220 ft 2 in) o/a; 50.50 m (165 ft 8 in) pressure hull
- Beam: 6.20 m (20 ft 4 in) o/a; 4.70 m (15 ft 5 in) pressure hull
- Height: 9.60 m (31 ft 6 in)
- Draught: 4.74 m (15 ft 7 in)
- Installed power: 2,800–3,200 PS (2,100–2,400 kW; 2,800–3,200 bhp) (diesels); 750 PS (550 kW; 740 shp) (electric)
- Propulsion: 2 shafts; 2 × diesel engines; 2 × electric motors
- Speed: 17.7 knots (32.8 km/h; 20.4 mph) surfaced; 7.6 knots (14.1 km/h; 8.7 mph) submerged
- Range: 8,500 nmi (15,700 km; 9,800 mi) at 10 knots (19 km/h; 12 mph) surfaced; 80 nmi (150 km; 92 mi) at 4 knots (7.4 km/h; 4.6 mph) submerged
- Test depth: 230 m (750 ft); Crush depth: 250–295 m (820–968 ft)
- Complement: 4 officers, 40–56 enlisted
- Armament: 5 × 53.3 cm (21 in) torpedo tubes (four bow, one stern); 14 × G7e torpedoes; 1 × 8.8 cm (3.46 in) deck gun (220 rounds); 1 x 2 cm (0.79 in) C/30 AA gun

Service record
- Part of: 5th U-boat Flotilla; 3 March – 31 August 1942; 9th U-boat Flotilla; 1 September 1942 – 12 October 1944
- Identification codes: M 34 053
- Commanders: Oblt.z.S. / Kptlt. Adolf Oelrich; 3 March 1942 – August 1943; Kptlt. Horst-Thilo Queck; August 1943 – 27 June 1944; Oblt.z.S. Wilhelm Brauel; 28 June – 12 October 1944
- Operations: 6 patrols: 1st patrol: 12 August – 25 September 1942; 2nd patrol: 24 October – 28 December 1942; 3rd patrol: 6 February – 5 March 1943; 4th patrol: a. 12 April – 26 June 1943; b. 16 – 17 September 1943; 5th patrol: 25 September – 7 October 1943; 6th patrol: 21 November 1943 – 18 January 1944; 7th patrol: 5 March – 10 May 1944; 8th patrol: 8 – 10 July 1944; 9th patrol: 17 August – 29 September 1944
- Victories: 2 merchant ships sunk (17,612 GRT); 1 warship total loss (1,625 tons); 1 merchant ship damaged (9,348 GRT)

German submarine U-92 was a Type VIIC U-boat of Nazi Germany's Kriegsmarine during World War II.

She was laid down at the Flender Werke in Lübeck as yard number 296, launched on 10 January 1942 and commissioned on 3 March 1942. On 4 October 1944, U-92 was damaged by aerial bombing off Bergen at 60°24′N 5°19′E. The boat was put out of service on 12 October 1944, and eventually broken up in 1944 – 45.

== Design ==
German Type VIIC submarines were preceded by the shorter Type VIIB submarines. U-92 had a displacement of 769 tonnes (757 long tons) when at the surface and 871 tonnes (857 long tons) while submerged. She had a total length of 67.10 m (220 ft 2 in), a pressure hull length of 50.50 m (165 ft 8 in), a beam of 6.20 m (20 ft 4 in), a height of 9.60 m (31 ft 6 in), and a draught of 4.74 m (15 ft 7 in). The submarine was powered by two Germaniawerft F46 four-stroke, six-cylinder supercharged diesel engines producing a total of 2,800 to 3,200 metric horsepower (2,060 to 2,350 kW; 2,760 to 3,160 shp) for use while surfaced, two Brown, Boveri & Cie GG UB 720/8 double-acting electric motors producing a total of 750 metric horsepower (550 kW; 740 shp) for use while submerged. She had two shafts and two 1.23 m (4 ft) propellers. The boat was capable of operating at depths of up to 230 metres (750 ft).

The submarine had a maximum surface speed of 17.7 knots (32.8 km/h; 20.4 mph) and a maximum submerged speed of 7.6 knots (14.1 km/h; 8.7 mph). When submerged, the boat could operate for 80 nautical miles (150 km; 92 mi) at 4 knots (7.4 km/h; 4.6 mph); when surfaced, she could travel 8,500 nautical miles (15,700 km; 9,800 mi) at 10 knots (19 km/h; 12 mph). U-92 was fitted with five 53.3 cm (21 in) torpedo tubes (four fitted at the bow and one at the stern), fourteen torpedoes, one 8.8 cm (3.46 in) SK C/35 naval gun, 220 rounds, and a 2 cm (0.79 in) C/30 anti-aircraft gun. The boat had a complement of between forty-four and sixty.

== Summary of raiding history ==
Date	Ship	Nationality	Tonnage (Note: Merchant ship tonnages are in gross register tons. Military vessels are listed by tons displacement.)	Fate
19 November 1942	Clan Mactaggart	United Kingdom	7,622	Sunk
21 February 1943	Empire Trader	United Kingdom	9,990	Sunk
22 February 1943	NT Nielsen-Alonso	Norway	9,348	Damaged
27 August 1944	USS LST-327	United States Navy	1,625	Total loss

== Bibliography ==
- Busch, Rainer; Röll, Hans-Joachim (1999). German U-boat commanders of World War II : a biographical dictionary. Translated by Brooks, Geoffrey. London, Annapolis, Md: Greenhill Books, Naval Institute Press. ISBN 1-55750-186-6.
- Busch, Rainer; Röll, Hans-Joachim (1999). Der U-Boot-Krieg, 1939-1945: Deutsche U-Boot-Verluste von September 1939 bis Mai 1945 [German U-boat losses from September 1939 to May 1945] (in German). Vol. IV. Hamburg, Berlin, Bonn: Mittler. ISBN 3-8132-0514-2.
- Gröner, Eric; Jung, Dieter; Maass, Martin (1991). German Warships 1815-1945: U-boats and Mine Warfare Vessels. Vol. 2. Translated by Thomas, Keith; Magowan, Rachel. London: Conway Maritime Press. ISBN 0-85177-593-4.
