= German submarine U-628 =

German World War II submarine

History

Nazi Germany
- Name: U-628
- Ordered: 15 August 1940
- Builder: Blohm & Voss, Hamburg
- Yard number: 604
- Laid down: 7 August 1941
- Launched: 29 April 1942
- Commissioned: 25 June 1942
- Fate: Sunk on 3 July 1943 in the North Atlantic NW of Cape Ortegal in position 44°11′N 08°45′W, by depth charges from a RAF Liberator aircraft of 224/J Squadron.

General characteristics
- Class & type: Type VIIC submarine
- Displacement: 769 tonnes (757 long tons) surfaced; 871 t (857 long tons) submerged
- Length: 67.10 m (220 ft 2 in) o/a; 50.50 m (165 ft 8 in) pressure hull
- Beam: 6.20 m (20 ft 4 in) o/a; 4.70 m (15 ft 5 in) pressure hull
- Height: 9.60 m (31 ft 6 in)
- Draught: 4.74 m (15 ft 7 in)
- Installed power: 2,800–3,200 PS (2,100–2,400 kW; 2,800–3,200 bhp) (diesels); 750 PS (550 kW; 740 shp) (electric)
- Propulsion: 2 shafts; 2 × diesel engines; 2 × electric motors
- Speed: 17.7 knots (32.8 km/h; 20.4 mph) surfaced; 7.6 knots (14.1 km/h; 8.7 mph) submerged
- Range: 8,500 nmi (15,700 km; 9,800 mi) at 10 knots (19 km/h; 12 mph) surfaced; 80 nmi (150 km; 92 mi) at 4 knots (7.4 km/h; 4.6 mph) submerged
- Test depth: 230 m (750 ft); Crush depth: 250–295 m (820–968 ft)
- Complement: 4 officers, 40–56 enlisted
- Armament: 5 × 53.3 cm (21 in) torpedo tubes (four bow, one stern); 14 × torpedoes or 26 TMA mines; 1 × 8.8 cm (3.46 in) deck gun (220 rounds); 1 x 2 cm (0.79 in) C/30 AA gun

Service record
- Part of: 5th U-boat Flotilla; 25 June – 30 November 1942; 1st U-boat Flotilla; 1 December 1942 – 3 July 1943
- Identification codes: M 07 314
- Commanders: Kptlt. Heinrich Hasenschar; 25 June 1942 – 3 July 1943
- Operations: 4 patrols: 1st patrol: 28 November 1942 – 8 January 1943; 2nd patrol: 1 February – 9 March 1943; 3rd patrol: 8 April – 19 May 1943; 4th patrol: 1 – 3 July 1943
- Victories: 4 merchant ships sunk (21,765 GRT); 3 merchant ships damaged (20,450 GRT)

German submarine U-628 was a Type VIIC U-boat built for Nazi Germany's Kriegsmarine for service during World War II. She was laid down on 7 August 1941 by Blohm & Voss, Hamburg as yard number 604, launched on 29 April 1942 and commissioned on 25 June 1942 under Kapitänleutnant Heinrich Hasenschar.

== Design ==
German Type VIIC submarines were preceded by the shorter Type VIIB submarines. U-628 had a displacement of 769 tonnes (757 long tons) when at the surface and 871 tonnes (857 long tons) while submerged. She had a total length of 67.10 m (220 ft 2 in), a pressure hull length of 50.50 m (165 ft 8 in), a beam of 6.20 m (20 ft 4 in), a height of 9.60 m (31 ft 6 in), and a draught of 4.74 m (15 ft 7 in). The submarine was powered by two Germaniawerft F46 four-stroke, six-cylinder supercharged diesel engines producing a total of 2,800 to 3,200 metric horsepower (2,060 to 2,350 kW; 2,760 to 3,160 shp) for use while surfaced, two Brown, Boveri & Cie GG UB 720/8 double-acting electric motors producing a total of 750 metric horsepower (550 kW; 740 shp) for use while submerged. She had two shafts and two 1.23 m (4 ft) propellers. The boat was capable of operating at depths of up to 230 metres (750 ft).

The submarine had a maximum surface speed of 17.7 knots (32.8 km/h; 20.4 mph) and a maximum submerged speed of 7.6 knots (14.1 km/h; 8.7 mph). When submerged, the boat could operate for 80 nautical miles (150 km; 92 mi) at 4 knots (7.4 km/h; 4.6 mph); when surfaced, she could travel 8,500 nautical miles (15,700 km; 9,800 mi) at 10 knots (19 km/h; 12 mph). U-628 was fitted with five 53.3 cm (21 in) torpedo tubes (four fitted at the bow and one at the stern), fourteen torpedoes, one 8.8 cm (3.46 in) SK C/35 naval gun, 220 rounds, and a 2 cm (0.79 in) C/30 anti-aircraft gun. The boat had a complement of between forty-four and sixty.

== Service history ==
The boat's service began on 25 June 1942 with training as part of the 5th U-boat Flotilla. She was transferred to the 1st Flotilla on 1 December 1942 for active service in the North Atlantic.

In four patrols she sank four merchant ships, for a total of 21,765 gross register tons (GRT), plus three merchant ships damaged.

=== Wolfpacks ===
U-628 took part in six wolfpacks, namely:

- Ungestüm (11 – 30 December 1942)
- Hartherz (3 – 7 February 1943)
- Ritter (11 – 26 February 1943)
- Without name (15 – 18 April 1943)
- Specht (19 April – 4 May 1943)
- Fink (4 – 6 May 1943)

=== Fate ===
U-628 was sunk on 3 July 1943 in the North Atlantic NW of Cape Ortegal in position 44°11′N 08°45′W; bombed and depth charged by RAF Liberator aircraft (FL963) of 224/J Squadron out of RAF St Eval in Cornwall. All 49 hands were lost.

== Summary of raiding history ==
Date	Ship Name	Nationality	Tonnage (GRT)	Fate
29 December 1942	Lynton Grange	United Kingdom	5,029	Sunk
23 February 1943	Glittre	Norway	6,409	Damaged
23 February 1943	Winkler	Panama	6,907	Damaged
24 February 1943	Ingria	Norway	4,391	Sunk
25 February 1943	Manchester Merchant	United Kingdom	7,264	Sunk
17 April 1943	Fort Rampart	United Kingdom	7,134	Damaged
5 May 1943	Harbury	United Kingdom	5,081	Sunk

== Bibliography ==
- Busch, Rainer; Röll, Hans-Joachim (1999). German U-boat commanders of World War II : a biographical dictionary. Translated by Brooks, Geoffrey. London, Annapolis, Md: Greenhill Books, Naval Institute Press. ISBN 1-55750-186-6.
- Busch, Rainer; Röll, Hans-Joachim (1999). Der U-Boot-Krieg, 1939-1945: Deutsche U-Boot-Verluste von September 1939 bis Mai 1945 [German U-boat losses from September 1939 to May 1945] (in German). Vol. IV. Hamburg, Berlin, Bonn: Mittler. ISBN 3-8132-0514-2.
- Edwards, Bernard (1996). Dönitz and the Wolf Packs - The U-boats at War. pp. 138, 160, 161, 198, 199. ISBN 0-304-35203-9.
- Gröner, Eric; Jung, Dieter; Maass, Martin (1991). German Warships 1815-1945: U-boats and Mine Warfare Vessels. Vol. 2. Translated by Thomas, Keith; Magowan, Rachel. London: Conway Maritime Press. ISBN 0-85177-593-4.
- Sharpe, Peter (1998). U-Boat Fact File. Great Britain: Midland Publishing. ISBN 1-85780-072-9.
