= List of shipwrecks in November 1943 =

The list of shipwrecks in November 1943 includes ships sunk, foundered, grounded, or otherwise lost during November 1943.

== 1 November ==
List of shipwrecks: 1 November 1943
Ship	State	Description
USS Borie	United States Navy	World War II: The Clemson-class destroyer received severe battle damage, sustained whilst depth charging and ramming U-405 (Kriegsmarine), which resulted in a surface battle (49°00′N 31°14′W) with small arms, she receiving extensive hull damage that necessitated her scuttling. 30 of her 122 crew were killed. The next day her survivors were rescued by USS Goff and USS Barry (both United States Navy). She was scuttled by a Grumman Avenger aircraft from USS Card (United States Navy) at 50°12′N 30°48′W.
Cha-13	Imperial Japanese Navy	World War II: The CHa-1-class submarine chaser was sunk off the Shortland Islands by American aircraft.
DB-2, DB-3, DB-8, DB-9, DB-9a, DB-10a, DB-11, DB-15, DB-17, DB-30 and DB-40	Soviet Navy	World War II: The No. 1-class landing boats were lost in the Kerch Straits during the landing at Etlingen.
KATShch-557	Soviet Navy	The R Type minesweeper was lost on this date.
KM-0188	Soviet Navy	The KM-2 type motor launch disappeared with all seven hands in the Kerch area.
HMS LCV(P) 1040	Royal Navy	The landing craft, vehicle and personnel (8/12 t, 1942) was lost on this date.
Marienburg	Germany	World War II: The cargo ship (1,322 GRT, 1917) was torpedoed and sunk by Soviet Ilyushin Il-4 aircraft off Steinort. The wreck was found in 2007.
No. 019	Soviet Navy	The MO-4-class patrol vessel was lost on this date.
No. 45	Soviet Navy	The G-5-class motor torpedo boats were lost on this date.
No. 0128	Soviet Navy	The K-193 Type ZK patrol boat was lost on this date.
No. 0168 and No. 0178	Soviet Navy	The KM-2 type motor launches were lost on this date.
No. 0912	Soviet Navy	The MO-4-class motor anti-submarine boat was lost on this date.
Ottaviano Augusto	Kriegsmarine	World War II: The Capitani Romani-class cruiser was bombed and sunk by Allied aircraft.
SG 20	Kriegsmarine	World War II: The escort ship, a former Generali-class torpedo boat, struck a mine, eventually sinking in Genoa Harbor. Raised in 1944.
TKA-72	Soviet Navy	World War II: The G-5-class motor torpedo boat was sunk by a mine off Etlingen in the Black Sea. Four crew were killed and four rescued.
U-405	Kriegsmarine	World War II: The Type VIIC submarine was scuttled in the Atlantic Ocean (49°00′N 31°14′W) after being depth charged and rammed by USS Borie (United States Navy) resulting in a small arms battle that killed most of the crew. The surviving crew scuttled the submarine but were not picked up by any German or Allied vessels in the area. Lost with all hands.
Unknown barge	Japan	The tow barge sank in the Philippine Sea. She broke her tow line on 30 October 1943 at 31°19′N 140°15′E five nautical miles (9.3 km; 5.8 mi) south south west of Sumisujima (Smith Island), Izu Shoto Islands. By the next day she had drifted to 33 nautical miles (61 km; 38 mi) east south east of Sumisu-Jima, location at time of sinking not recorded.
V 5525	Kriegsmarine	World War II: The Vorpostenboot was damaged with gunfire by HNoMS MTB 709 and HNoMS MTB 712 (both Royal Norwegian Navy) off Skorpa, Norway, and beached. The ship was then destroyed by fire. Of the 17 crew, six were killed and seven were wounded.
V 5531	Kriegsmarine	World War II: The Vorpostenboot was sunk with gunfire by HNoMS MTB 709 and HNoMS MTB 712 (both Royal Norwegian Navy) off Skorpa, Norway. All 17 crew members were killed.

== 2 November ==
List of shipwrecks: 2 November 1943
Ship	State	Description
Baron Semple	United Kingdom	World War II: The cargo ship (4,573 GRT, 1939) was torpedoed and sunk in the South Atlantic north of Ascension Island (approximately 5°S 21°W) by U-848 (Kriegsmarine) with the loss of all 62 crew.
DB-4, DB-25 and DB-27	Soviet Navy	The No. 1-class landing boats were lost on this date.
Delagoa Maru	Imperial Japanese Army	World War II: Convoy O-112: The Delagoa Maru-class auxiliary transport ship was torpedoed and sunk in the East China Sea about 240 nautical miles (440 km; 280 mi) south of Cape Muroto (28°20′N 135°20′E) by USS Trigger (United States Navy). 201 of 206 men of the 248th Air Regiment, 12 Imperial Japanese Army civilian employees, seven gunners and 68 crew were killed.
Ehime Maru	Japan	World War II: Convoy O-112: The cargo ship was torpedoed and sunk in the Pacific Ocean south east of Kyushu (28°20′N 134°50′E) by USS Halibut (United States Navy). Five gunners and all 79 crew were killed.
F 560	Kriegsmarine	World War II: The Type C2 Marinefahrprahm was scuttled after running aground near Skadovsk, Ukraine. The crew was rescued by F 127.
Hatsukaze	Imperial Japanese Navy	World War II: Battle of Empress Augusta Bay: The Kagerō-class destroyer collided with Myōkō (Imperial Japanese Navy), shearing off her bow and leaving her without power. She was then shelled and sunk off Bougainville Island (6°01′S 153°58′E) by ships of Task Force 39, United States Navy,^{[Note 1]} with the loss of all 240 hands.
L 1293	Germany	World War II: The barge was torpedoed and sunk in the Black Sea by M-35 (Soviet Navy).
Manko Maru	Japan	World War II: The chartered Manko Maru-class auxiliary storeship (1,502 GRT 1923) was bombed and sunk by near misses by North American B-25 Mitchell aircraft of the United States Fifth Air Force's 3rd, 38th and 345th Bomb Groups at Rabaul, New Britain.
No. 055	Soviet Navy	The MO-4-class motor anti-submarine boat was lost on this date.
No. 064	Soviet Navy	The MO-4-class motor anti-submarine boat was lost on this date.
No. 084	Soviet Navy	The MO-4-class motor anti-submarine boat was lost on this date.
No. 0123	Soviet Navy	The KM-2 type motor launch was lost on this date.
No. 214 Za Stalingrad and No. 414	Soviet Navy	The Project 1124 armored motor gunboats were lost on this date.
No. 6685	Soviet Navy	The R Type minesweeper was lost on this date.
Seinko Maru	Japan	World War II: The cargo ship was sunk in an air attack, Simpson Harbor, Rabaul, New Guinea.
Sendai	Imperial Japanese Navy	World War II: Battle of Empress Augusta Bay: The Sendai-class cruiser was shelled and damaged by ships of Task Force 39, United States Navy. She sank the next day off Bougainville Island (6°10′S 154°20′E) with the loss her commanding officer and 189 crewmen. 236 survivors were rescued by Imperial Japanese Navy destroyers, and Ro-104 (Imperial Japanese Navy) rescued Admiral Ijuin and 75 crewmen.
TK-106 and TK-146 Osvodovets	Soviet Navy	World War II: The D-3-class motor torpedo boats were sunk in the Baltic Sea by Kriegsmarine minesweepers.
U-340	Kriegsmarine	World War II: The Type VIIC submarine was scuttled in the Atlantic Ocean off Punta Almina, Morocco (35°33′N 6°37′W) follow battle damage inflicted by HMS Active, HMS Fleetwood and HMS Witherington (all Royal Navy) and a Consolidated B-24 Liberator aircraft on 179 Squadron, Royal Air Force. One of her 49 crew was killed.
Ume Maru	Imperial Japanese Army	World War II: Convoy O-112: The Daifuku Maru No. 1-class transport was torpedoed and sunk in the Pacific Ocean south east of Kyushu (28°56′N 135°26′E) by USS Seahorse (United States Navy). 36 passengers, 25 gunners and 24 crewmen were killed.
W-26	Imperial Japanese Navy	World War II: The W-19-class minesweeper was bombed and damaged by North American B-25 Mitchell aircraft of the United States Fifth Air Force's 3rd, 38th and 345th Bomb Groups at Rabaul. She was beached to prevent sinking. Refloated, repaired and returned to service.
Yawata Maru	Imperial Japanese Army	World War II: Convoy O-112: The Yawata Maru-class transport ship was torpedoed and sunk in the Pacific Ocean south east of Kyushu about 240 nautical miles (440 km; 280 mi) south of Cape Muroto (28°20′N 135°20′E) by USS Trigger (United States Navy). Four gunners and 64 crew were killed.

== 3 November ==
List of shipwrecks: 3 November 1943
Ship	State	Description
Chihaya Maru	Imperial Japanese Navy	World War II: Convoy O-112: The auxiliary transport ship (7,089 GRT 1926) was torpedoed and sunk in the Pacific Ocean about 240 nautical miles (440 km; 280 mi) south of Cape Muroto (29°31′N 134°50′E) by USS Seahorse (United States Navy). Six crew were killed.
Dona Isabel	United Kingdom	World War II: Convoy CW 221: The cargo ship was torpedoed and sunk in the English Channel by S 136 (Kriegsmarine).
Foam Queen	United Kingdom	World War II: Convoy CW 221: The cargo ship was torpedoed and sunk in the English Channel by S 100 and S 138 (both Kriegsmarine). Ten crew and two gunners were killed.
Minato Maru	Imperial Japanese Navy	World War II: The Minato Maru-class naval trawler/auxiliary stores ship was bombed and sunk 19 nautical miles (35 km; 22 mi) off Ocean Island, Gilbert Islands (0°43′S 169°10′E) by a United States Navy Consolidated PB4Y-2 Privateer patrol bomber. Three crew were killed.
Mont Viso	France	World War II: Convoy KMS 30: The cargo ship was torpedoed and sunk in the Mediterranean Sea 40 nautical miles (74 km; 46 mi) north of Ténès, Algeria (36°45′N 1°55′E) by U-593 (Kriegsmarine) with the loss of 35 of her 49 crew. Survivors were rescued by HMS Bryony (Royal Navy).
MS 33	Regia Marina	World War II: The MS 11-class MS boat was shelled and sunk by German gunfire off Silvi Marina, Italy.
No. 054	Soviet Navy	The MO-4-class motor anti-submarine boat was lost on this date.
No. 079	Soviet Navy	The MO-4-class motor anti-submarine boat was lost on this date.
Storaa	United Kingdom	World War II: Convoy CW 221: The cargo ship was torpedoed and sunk in the English Channel off Hastings, Sussex by S 138 (Kriegsmarine). Of the 36 men aboard, 14 were rescued and 22 (19 crew and 3 gunners) were killed.
StuBo 1028	Kriegsmarine	World War II: The StuBo42 type landing craft/motor launch was sunk by artillery fire at Kherson, Ukraine.
Tanganyika	Kriegsmarine	World War II: The accommodation ship was bombed, set afire and sunk at Wilhelmshaven during an American air raid. She was refloated in 1948 and scrapped.
UJ 2206 Saint Martin Lagasse	Kriegsmarine	World War II: The naval trawler/submarine chaser was sunk in the Mediterranean Sea off Porto Santo Stefano, Italy by USS PT-212 (United States Navy).
Ume Maru	Japan	World War II: Convoy O-112: The cargo ship was torpedoed and sunk in the Pacific Ocean about 240 nautical miles (440 km; 280 mi) south of Cape Muroto (28°20′N 134°48′E) by USS Seahorse (United States Navy). 36 passengers, 25 gunners and 24 crew were killed.

== 4 November ==
List of shipwrecks: 4 November 1943
Ship	State	Description
Asayama Maru	Japan	World War II: The cargo ship was sunk in the Solomon Islands by American aircraft.
British Progress	United Kingdom	World War II: Convoy FN 1170E: The tanker (4,581 GRT, 1927) was torpedoed and damaged in the North Sea (52°55′N 2°00′E) by Kriegsmarine Schnellboote with the loss of two of her 53 cfrew. She was towed in to the River Tyen and was consequently declared a constructive total loss. She was scrapped in 1944.
CHa-30	Imperial Japanese Navy	World War II: The CHa-1-class submarine chaser was sunk off Bougainville Island by American aircraft or USS Tautog (United States Navy).
F 126	Kriegsmarine	The Type A Marinefahrprahm was sunk on this date. Raised, but not repaired.
Firelight	United Kingdom	The collier was torpedoed and severely damaged off Cromer, Norfolk by a Kriegsmarine E-boat. She was on a voyage from the River Thames to the River Tyne. She was towed in to Great Yarmouth, Norfolk the next day. Subsequently towed to Sunderland, County Durham, repaired and returned to service.
Giyu Maru	Japan	World War II: The cargo ship was sunk in the Solomon Islands by American aircraft.
HMS LCT 583	Royal Navy	The Mk 1 landing craft tank (350/586 t, 1942) was lost in Home Waters.
M 16	Kriegsmarine	World War II: The minesweeper was sunk in the Baltic Sea by Soviet aircraft. Later raised, repaired, and returned to service.
HMS MTB 606	Royal Navy	World War II: The Fairmile D motor torpedo boat (90/107 t, 1942) was shelled and sunk in the North Sea by Kriegsmarine surface ships off the coast of the Netherlands.
New Merrimac	United States	The 13-gross register ton, 32.9-foot (10.0 m) motor cargo vessel sank off Commano Point at Ketchikan, Territory of Alaska.
Ryuosan Maru	Japan	World War II: The cargo ship was mined in the Pacific Ocean off Kavieng, New Ireland (02°40′S 150°40′E). 16 crew were killed and 20 wounded, 4 dying of their wounds later. The ship sank the next day off Edmago Island.
SKA-053	Soviet Navy	World War II: Kerch-Eltigen Operation: The patrol boat was sunk in the Black Sea off Eltigen, probably by R 37, R 204 and R 211 (all Kriegsmarine). All 12 crew were killed.
T-524	Soviet Navy	World War II: Kerch-Eltigen Operation: The minesweeper was sunk in the Black Sea, probably by R 37, R 204 and R 211 (all Kriegsmarine).
TK-101	Soviet Navy	World War II: Kerch-Eltigen Operation: The G-5-class motor torpedo boat was sunk with 37-millimetre (1.5 in) gunfire and hand grenades in the Black Sea by R 37, R 204 and R 211 (all Kriegsmarine). All seven crew were killed.
Tsukushi	Imperial Japanese Navy	World War II: The Tsukushi-class survey ship was mined and sunk off Kavieng (02°40′S 150°40′E).

== 5 November ==
List of shipwrecks: 5 November 1943
Ship	State	Description
Beatrice Beck	United Kingdom	World War II: The schooner (146 GRT, 1927) was torpedoed and sunk in the Atlantic Ocean east of Martinique by U-218 (Kriegsmarine). All 13 hands were lost.
F 313	Kriegsmarine	World War II: The Type A Marinefahrprahm was sunk off Kherson by Soviet artillery fire.
KATShch-559	Soviet Navy	The R Type minesweeper was lost on this date.
Kiebitz	Kriegsmarine	World War II: The minelayer was sunk in an Allied air raid on Fiume, Yugoslavia. She was later refloated, repaired and returned to service.
Militades	Greece	World War II: The sailing vessel (150 GRT) was sunk in the Mediterranean Sea off Karpathos by HMS Seraph (Royal Navy).
No. 116 Molody Patriot Trudovykh Rezervov	Soviet Navy	The G-5-class motor torpedo boat was lost on this date.
S 74	Kriegsmarine	World War II: The Schnellboot was attacked in the North Sea by British aircraft. She was scuttled by S 135 (Kriegsmarine) due to damage sustained. One crew was killed.
U-848	Kriegsmarine	World War II: The Type IXD2 submarine was depth charged and sunk in the South Atlantic south west of Ascension Island (10°09′S 18°00′W by three United States Navy Consolidated B-24 Liberator aircraft of Squadron VB-107 and two United States Army Air Forces North American B-25 Mitchell aircraft with the loss of all 63 crew.
USS YCK-2	United States Navy	The open cargo lighter was lost in the Atlantic Ocean east of Cape Breton Island (45°47′N 58°57′W).

== 6 November ==
List of shipwrecks: 6 November 1943
Ship	State	Description
Asahi Maru No. 9	Japan	World War II: The ship was bombed and sunk by North American B-25 Mitchell aircraft west of Buka, Bougainville Island. Four crew were killed.
USS Beatty	United States Navy	World War II: Convoy KMF 25A: The Gleaves-class destroyer was torpedoed and sunk in the Mediterranean Sea off the coast of Algeria by Junkers Ju 88 aircraft Kampfgeschwader 26, Luftwaffe with the loss of 11 of her 276 crew.
CH-11	Imperial Japanese Navy	World War II: The CH-4-class submarine chaser was bombed and sunk west of Buka by American North American B-25 Mitchell aircraft.
Chozan Maru	Imperial Japanese Navy	World War II: The Peacetime Standard Type D auxiliary water tanker (a.k.a. Chosan Maru and Asayama Maru) was bombed and sunk west of Buka by US North American B-25 Mitchell aircraft.
DB-16 and DB-26	Soviet Navy	The No. 1-class landing boats were lost on this date.
Esterina	Regia Marina	World War II: The cargo ship was sunk at Split, Yugoslavia by Royal Air Force aircraft. She was raised post-war and repaired, re-entering service in 1952 as Sava.
Marnix van Sint Aldegonde	Netherlands	World War II: Convoy KMF 25A: The passenger ship (19,355 GRT, 1930) was torpedoed and damaged in the Mediterranean Sea 6 nautical miles (11 km) off the Cape Bougaroin Light, Algeria by Junkers Ju 88 aircraft of Kampfgeschwader 26, Luftwaffe. She was taken under tow, but sank the next day before making port.
Narkyssos	Greece	World War II: The sailing vessel was sunk in the Mediterranean Sea off Karpathos by HMS Seraph (Royal Navy).
Santa Elena	United States	World War II: Convoy KMF 25A: The troopship was torpedoed and damaged in the Mediterranean Sea 27 nautical miles (50 km; 31 mi) off Philippeville, Algeria by Junkers Ju 88 aircraft of Kampfgeschwader 26, Luftwaffe. After temporarily abandoning the ship she was reboarded by her crew and gunners and taken under tow. The next day she suffered fatal damage when rammed by the damaged freighter Marnix van St. Aldegonde (Netherlands) and sank. Four crewmen were killed.
Santhia	United Kingdom	The troopship caught fire in the Hooghly River. She capsized on 24 November. She was righted on 4 November 1945 and consequently scrapped.
Surville	France	World War II: The cargo ship struck a mine 8 nautical miles (15 km) south east of Cape Bon, Algeria with some loss of life. She was beached 1 nautical mile (1.9 km) from the Ras el Mustafa Lighthouse. She was a total loss.
U-226	Kriegsmarine	World War II: The Type VIIC submarine was depth charged and sunk in the Atlantic Ocean (44°49′N 41°13′W) by HMS Kite, HMS Starling, and HMS Woodcock (all Royal Navy) with the loss of all 51 crew.
U-842	Kriegsmarine	World War II: The Type IXC/40 submarine was depth charged and sunk in the Atlantic Ocean (43°42′N 42°08′W) by HMS Starling and HMS Wild Goose (both Royal Navy) with the loss of all 56 crew.

== 7 November ==
List of shipwrecks: 7 November 1943
Ship	State	Description
DB-9, DB-36 and DB-46	Soviet Navy	The No. 1-class landing boats were lost on this date.
GA 45	Kriegsmarine	World War II: The submarine chaser was shelled and sunk in the Mediterranean Sea off Armorgos, Greece by HMS Pathfinder and HMS Penn (both Royal Navy).
Inushima Maru No. 6	Japan	World War II: The cargo ship was bombed and sunk at Amoy, China by North American B-25 Mitchell aircraft of the United States Fourteenth Air Force.
Kanlu	Japan	World War II: The auxiliary sailing vessel was bombed and sunk at Amoy by North American B-25 Mitchell aircraft of the United States Fourteenth Air Force.
No. 16, No. 26, No. 66	Soviet Navy	The No. 16-class landing tenders were lost on this date.
No. 65	Soviet Navy	World War II: Kerch-Eltigen Operation: The No. 11-class landing tender was sunk in the Black Sea by R 37, R 204 and R 211 (all Kriegsmarine).
SKA-053	Soviet Navy	World War II: The patrol boat was probably sunk in the Black Sea by R 37, R 204 and R 211 (all Kriegsmarine).
No. 36, and No. 76	Soviet Navy	World War II: Kerch-Eltigen Operation: The No. 16-class landing tenders were sunk in the Black Sea by R 37, R 204 and R 211 (all Kriegsmarine).
No. 111	Soviet Navy	The G-5-class motor torpedo boat was lost on this date.
No. 421	Soviet Navy	The Project 1124 armored motor gunboat was lost on this date.
Nagata Naru No. 28	Japan	World War II: The cargo ship was bombed and sunk at Amoy by North American B-25 Mitchell aircraft of the United States Fourteenth Air Force.
Royal	United States	The 7-gross register ton, 30.8-foot (9.4 m) fishing vessel was destroyed by fire in Fish Bay (57°23′N 135°37′W) in Southeast Alaska.

== 8 November ==
List of shipwrecks: 8 November 1943
Ship	State	Description
DB-6 and DB-7	Soviet Navy	World War II: The No. 1-class landing boats were sunk in the Black Sea by Kriegsmarine MFPs.
Kyokuei Maru	Japan	World War II: Convoy HI-14: The ship was torpedoed and sunk near Dangerous Ground, Palawan by USS Bluefish (United States Navy). There were no casualties. Survivors were rescued by Tsushima (Imperial Japanese Navy).
No. 25	Soviet Navy	The No. 11-class landing tender was lost on this date.
SKA-0122	Soviet Navy	World War II: Kerch-Eltigen Operation: The PK-115 Type MO-2 patrol boat was sunk in the Black Sea by Kriegsmarine MFPs and minesweepers. There were no survivor among the 21 crew and the soldiers aboard.
Tango Maru	Japan	World War II: The tanker was torpedoed and sunk in the Makassar Strait off Bali, 24 nautical miles (45 km) south east of Cape Lubuanbini, Borneo (00°25′N 119°45′E) by USS Rasher (United States Navy). Two Japanese passengers and six Javanese crew were reported missing.

== 9 November ==
List of shipwrecks: 9 November 1943
Ship	State	Description
F 419	Kriegsmarine	World War II: The Type C2M minelaying Marinefahrprahm was irreparably damaged in the Black Sea by a "friendly" shell fired by F 304. The vessel sank on 11 November. Six crewmen were killed and five wounded.
F 449	Kriegsmarine	World War II: The Type C2M minelaying Marinefahrprahm ran aground in Kerch Strait and was scuttled. The whole crew was rescued by F 578.
KATSh-173	Soviet Navy	World War II: Kerch-Eltigen Operation: The minesweeper was shelled and sunk in the Black Sea by Kriegsmarine MFPs.
HMS MTB 230	Royal Navy	The Vosper 72 foot-class motor torpedo boat was sunk in the North Sea in a collision with HMS MTB 222 (Royal Navy).
Taga Maru	Imperial Japanese Navy	World War II: Convoy FU-503: The Isuzu Maru-class transport ship was torpedoed and damaged in the South China Sea south east off Formosa (21°40′N 131°12′E) by USS Sargo (United States Navy). Six crewmen killed. Survivors were rescued by Satsuki (Imperial Japanese Navy), then Satsuki scuttled Taga Maru by shelling.
U-707	Kriegsmarine	World War II: The Type VIIC submarine was depth charged and sunk in the Atlantic Ocean east of the Azores, Portugal (40°31′N 20°17′W) by a Boeing B-17 Flying Fortress aircraft of 220 Squadron, Royal Air Force with the loss of all 51 crew.

== 10 November ==
List of shipwrecks: 10 November 1943
Ship	State	Description
HMMTB 222	Royal Navy	The Vosper 72 foot-class motor torpedo boat sank from damage sustained in a collision in the North Sea with HMMTB 230 (Royal Navy).
Kisogawa Maru	Imperial Japanese Navy	World War II: The Peacetime Standard Type D auxiliary water tanker was torpedoed and sunk in the Straits of Malacca off Murray west coast, about 67 nautical miles (124 km; 77 mi) north west of Penang (06°12′N 99°27′E) by HMS Tally-Ho (Royal Navy). There were no survivors from her crew of 42.
Nikkai Maru	Imperial Japanese Navy	Convoy 2101: The Sinkyo Maru-class auxiliary transport ran aground on Dewate Island. The vessel was pulled off on 12 November.
Tokyo Maru	Imperial Japanese Navy	World War II: The Canberra Maru-class transport was torpedoed and damaged in the Pacific Ocean (04°06′N 150°17′E) by USS Scamp (United States Navy). Three crewmen were killed. She sank under tow on 12 November at 05°42′N 151°09′E. Survivors were rescued by Mitakesan Maru (Imperial Japanese Navy).
Sambo	United Kingdom	World War II: The Liberty ship was torpedoed and sunk in the Gulf of Aden 12°28′N 43°31′E) by I-27 (Imperial Japanese Navy). Nine gunners and three crewmen were killed. One gunner and 34 crewmen were rescued by Helgøy (Norway).
U-966	Kriegsmarine	World War II: The Type VIIC submarine was depth charged and sunk in the Bay of Biscay off Cape Ortegal, Spain by Consolidated B-24 Liberator and Vickers Wellington aircraft of 311 and 612 Squadrons, Royal Air Force and also by Consolidated B-24 Liberator aircraft of the United States Navy with the loss eight of her 50 crew. Wreck located in 2018.
Unknown landing craft	Soviet Navy	Kerch-Eltigen Operation: The small landing craft capsized and sank in the Black Sea.

== 11 November ==
List of shipwrecks: 11 November 1943
Ship	State	Description
Argentinos	Germany	World War II: The auxiliary sailing vessel (64 GRT) was sunk in the Mediterranean Sea by ORP Sokół (Polish Navy).
Birchbank	United Kingdom	World War II: Convoy KMS 31: The cargo ship (5,151 GRT, 1924) was torpedoed and sunk in the Mediterranean Sea north east of Oran, Algeria (36°13′N 0°06′W) by Luftwaffe aircraft. These comprised Dornier Do 217s of II Staffeln, Kampfgeschwader 100, Heinkel He 111s of I Staffeln, Kampfgeschwader 26 and Junkers Ju 88s of III Staffeln, Kampfgeschwader 26. Two of her 67 crew were killed.
Cape San Juan	United States	World War II: The Type C1-B cargo ship, converted into a troop transport, was torpedoed and damaged in the Pacific Ocean off Viti Levu, Fiji (22°08′S 178°06′E) by I-21 (Imperial Japanese Navy). 130 people were killed. Survivors were rescued by USS Dempsey, USS McCalla (both United States Navy) and Edwin T. Merideth (United States). She sank the next day.
Carlier	Belgium	World War II: Convoy KMS 31: The cargo ship was sunk in the Mediterranean Sea 40 nautical miles (74 km) north of Oran, Algeria (36°13′N 0°05′W) by bombing and aerial torpedoes dropped by Dornier Do-217, Heinkel He 111 and Junkers Ju 88 aircraft of Kampfgeschwader 26 and Kampfgeschwader 100, Luftwaffe with the loss of 72 of the 91 people on board.
HMS HDML 1244	Royal Navy	World War II: The Harbour Defence Motor Launch (44/52 t, 1943) was lost as cargo when Indian Prince (United Kingdom) was torpedoed and sunk by German aircraft off Oran (36°10′N 0°06′W) with the loss of one of the 61 people on boatd.
HMS HDML 1289	Royal Navy	World War II: The Harbour Defence Motor Launch (44/52 t, 1943) was lost as cargo when Indian Prince (United Kingdom) was torpedoed and sunk by German aircraft off Oran.
Indian Prince	United Kingdom	World War II: Convoy KMS 31: The cargo ship (8,587 GRT, 1926) was torpedoed and sunk by German aircraft off Oran.
Kanamayasai Maru	Japan	World War II: The cargo ship was torpedoed and sunk in the Pacific Ocean by USS Drum (United States Navy).
Kosei Maru	Imperial Japanese Navy	World War II: Convoy FU-503: The Koto Maru No. 2 Go-class auxiliary transport ship (3,551 GRT, 1937) was torpedoed and sunk in the South China Sea 40 nautical miles (74 km; 46 mi) south east of Kikai-Shima Island (27°40′N 109°28′E) by USS Sargo (United States Navy). 12 crewmen were killed. Survivors were rescued by Satsuki (Imperial Japanese Navy).
Kunitama Maru	Japan	World War II: The cargo ship was torpedoed and sunk in the Pacific Ocean north west of Ambon Island, Netherlands East Indies by USS Capelin (United States Navy).
MAS 555	Regia Marina	World War II: The MAS 552-class MAS boat was scuttled by shore batteries at Leros, Greece to prevent capture.
No. 076	Soviet Navy	The KM-2 type motor launch was lost on this date.
HMS Rockwood	Royal Navy	World War II: The Hunt-class destroyer (1,087/1,490 t, 1942) was severely damaged in the Mediterranean Sea by a Henschel Hs 293 glide bomb dropped by aircraft of Kampfgeschwader 100, Luftwaffe.
Suzunami	Imperial Japanese Navy	World War II: The Yūgumo-class destroyer was bombed, blown up and sank at Rabaul, New Britain (04°13′S 152°11′E) by United States Navy carrier planes. 148 crew were killed.
Trapani	Germany	World War II: The cargo ship was shelled and sunk in the Mediterranean Sea off Kos, Greece by HMS Jervis and HMS Penn (both Royal Navy).

== 12 November ==
List of shipwrecks: 12 November 1943
Ship	State	Description
Banco	Kriegsmarine	The coaster collided with NKi 11 (Kriegsmarine) off Berlevåg, Norway and capsized. Raised in 1946, repaired and returned to service as Paust in 1948 for a Norwegian owner.
Ch-20	Imperial Japanese Navy	World War II: The submarine chaser was torpedoed and sunk in the Pacific Ocean by USS Harder (United States Navy.
DB-1 and DB-37	Soviet Navy	The No. 1-class landing boats were lost on this date.
HMS ML 358	Royal Navy	World War II: Battle of Leros: The Fairmile B motor launch was lost off Leros, Greece when she met the German convoy carrying the force to invade the island. 11 crewmen were killed, five survived as prisoners of war.
Misago Maru No. 11	Imperial Japanese Navy	World War II: The auxiliary minesweeper was torpedoed and sunk in the Pacific Ocean north of the Mariana Islands (21°40′N 144°40′E) by USS Harder (United States Navy).
Muko Maru	Imperial Japanese Navy	World War II: The Muko Maru-class auxiliary transport was torpedoed and sunk 110 nautical miles (200 km) north north east of Truk (09°02′N 152°46′E) by USS Thresher (United States Navy). 18 crew were killed.
No. 71	Soviet Navy	The G-5-class motor torpedo boat was lost on this date.
PiLB 391	Kriegsmarine	The PiLB 40 type landing craft was lost on this date.
Theodoric	Germany	World War II: The cargo ship was torpedoed and sunk in the Burnas Lagoon by M-111 (Soviet Navy).
U-508	Kriegsmarine	World War II: The Type IXC submarine was depth charged and sunk in the Bay of Biscay (46°00′N 7°30′W) by a Consolidated B-24 Liberator aircraft of the United States Navy with the loss of all 57 crew.
USS YC-857	United States Navy	The non self-propelled covered lighter ran aground and sank off Cape Cod, Massachusetts.

== 13 November ==
List of shipwrecks: 13 November 1943
Ship	State	Description
Athina Livanos	Greece	World War II: The cargo ship was sunk by torpedo in the Indian Ocean (12°23′N 44°00′E) by I-27 (Imperial Japanese Navy) with the loss of 11 of her 36 crew.
Cormount	United Kingdom	World War II: The cargo ship (2,841 GRT, 1936) struck a mine and sank in the Humber Estuary.
HMS Dulverton	Royal Navy	World War II: Battle of Leros: The Hunt-class destroyer (1,050/1,430 t, 1941) was bombed and damaged in the Aegean Sea off Leros, Greece by Dornier Do 217 aircraft of the Luftwaffe carrying Henschel Hs 293 glider bombs. She was scuttled by HMS Belvoir (Royal Navy) with the loss of 78 of her 198 crew.
Franklin Baker II	United States	The trawler sank off Pompano Beach, Florida at 26°09′N 79°52′W.
I-34	Imperial Japanese Navy	World War II: The Type B1 submarine was torpedoed and sunk in the Malacca Strait 10 nautical miles (19 km) north west of the Muka Lighthouse, Malaya (05°17′N 100°05′E) by HMS Taurus (Royal Navy). 84 crew were killed, 14 survivors were rescued by a junk.
Lorenz L-M Russ	Germany	World War II: The cargo ship was sunk in an Allied air raid at Piraeus, Greece. She was refloated in 1948, repaired and entered Panamanian service as Pontresina.
Nachisan Maru	Imperial Japanese Navy	World War II: Convoy No. 113-MA-07: The Nachisan Maru-class auxiliary transport ship (a.k.a. Nachizan Maru) was torpedoed and sunk in the Pacific Ocean 60 miles (97 km) southwest of Saishu-to (32°55′N 125°09′E) by USS Trigger (United States Navy). Her Captain and with 45 crewmen killed. Kuretake (Imperial Japanese Navy) and Nittetsu Maru (Japan) rescued survivors.
Nikkai Maru	Japan	World War II: The cargo ship was torpedoed and sunk in the Bismarck Sea by USS Ray (United States Navy).
No. 31	Soviet Navy	The Project 1124 armored motor gunboat was lost on this date.
Pompoon	Panama	World War II: The cargo ship was torpedoed and sunk in the Caribbean Sea 75 nautical miles (139 km) north of Cartagena, Colombia (approximately 11°N 75°W) by U-516 (Kriegsmarine) with the loss of 23 of her 27 crew. Survivors were rescued by a Panamanian merchant ship.
Tango Maru	Japan	World War II: The cargo ship was sunk in the East China Sea by American aircraft.

== 14 November ==
List of shipwrecks: 14 November 1943
Ship	State	Description
HMS LCT 333, HMS LCT 343 and HMS LCT 385	Royal Navy	The landing craft tanks were lost in a storm off Land's End.
Mariupol	Soviet Union	The tanker was wrecked on Shumshu.
Riverton	Canada	The steamer was wrecked on Lottie Wolf Shoal off Hope Island, Georgian Bay, Lake Huron. Later salvaged, repaired and return to service as Mohawk Deer (Canada).
Stefanos	Greece	World War II: The sailing vessel (150 GRT) was shelled and sunk south-west of Psara, Greece by HMS Sibyl (Royal Navy). The three crewmen survived.

== 15 November ==
List of shipwrecks: 15 November 1943
Ship	State	Description
Agia Trias	Greece	World War II: The sailing vessel (43 GRT) was shelled and sunk south-east of Limnos, Greece by HMS Sibyl (Royal Navy). There were four dead and seven survivors.
Eleftherios V	Greece	World War II: The Greek sailing ship (100 GRT) was sunk with gunfire north of Naxos, Greece, by HMS Sportsman (Royal Navy).
F 592	Kriegsmarine	World War II: The Type C2A Marinefährprahm was torpedoed and sunk in the Black Sea by ShCh-215 (Soviet Navy). Four crewmen and 11 troops were reported missing.
Kyokko Maru	Imperial Japanese Army	World War II: Convoy 777: The Eastern Shore-class auxiliary transport was torpedoed and sunk in the South China Sea north west of Subic Bay (14°52′N 119°56′E) by USS Crevalle (United States Navy). Eight troops and two crew were killed.
PiLB 482	Kriegsmarine	World War II: The PiLB 40 type landing craft was sunk off Leros by MTB 226 and MTB 315 (both Royal Navy).
PVO-11 and PVO-13	Soviet Navy	World War II: The PVO-10-class anti-aircraft motorboats was beached after being damaged by MFPs in the Black Sea. Later repaired and returned to service.
PVO-24	Soviet Navy	World War II: The PVO-10-class anti-aircraft motorboat was sunk in the Black Sea when rammed by an MFP.
HMS Quail	Royal Navy	World War II: The Q-class destroyer (1,692/2,411 t, 1943) struck a mine and was damaged in the Adriatic Sea off Bari, Apulia, Italy (at 41°09′N 16°52′E) with the loss of 19 crew, and was beached. Refloated in December 1943 and temporarily repaired at Bari. Towed to Taranto in April 1944. Foundered on 18 June 1944 in the Gulf of Taranto (40°05′N 17°52′E) whilst under tow to Malta.
TKA-35	Soviet Navy	World War II: The G-5-class motor torpedo boat was sunk by a mine off Eltigen, Crimea.
UJ 102	Kriegsmarine	World War II: The submarine chaser was sunk in the Black Sea by the explosion of a sunken ship which she depth charged. The wreck contained a cargo of ammunition.

== 16 November ==
List of shipwrecks: 16 November 1943
Ship	State	Description
USS Corvina	United States Navy	World War II: The Gato-class submarine was torpedoed and sunk in the Pacific Ocean off Truk, South Seas Mandate (5°05′N 151°10′E) by I-176 (Imperial Japanese Navy) with the loss of all 60 crew.
Kyoritsu Maru No. 2	Japan	World War II: The transport ship was sunk in the Pacific Ocean north of New Britain by Consolidated PBY Catalina aircraft of the United States Navy.
HMS LCT 332	Royal Navy	The landing craft tank (350/625 t, 1942) foundered off Gijón, Spain.
HMS LCT 418	Royal Navy	The landing craft tank (350/625 t, 1942) was lost in a storm off the north west coast of France.
No. 0113 and No. 0153	Soviet Navy	The KM-2 type motor launches were lost on this date.
SF 105	Kriegsmarine	World War II: The Siebel ferry was sunk off Kalymnos by Bristol Beaufighter aircraft of 47 and 603 Squadron RAF. Ten men were killed and three wounded.
Tetsuwa Maru	Japan	World War II: The cargo ship was bombed and sunk at Canton, China by Consolidated B-24 Liberator aircraft of the United States Fourteenth Air Force.
U-280	Kriegsmarine	World War II: The Type VIIC submarine was depth charged and sunk in the Atlantic Ocean south west of Iceland (49°11′N 27°32′W) by a Consolidated B-24 Liberator aircraft of 86 Squadron, Royal Air Force with the loss of all 49 crew.
Ukishima	Imperial Japanese Navy	World War II: The Sokuten-class minelayer was lost to an unknown cause, possibly by a mine, in the Sagami-nada Sea 11 miles (18 km) southeast of Hatsushima (34°55′N 139°22′E).

== 17 November ==
List of shipwrecks: 17 November 1943
Ship	State	Description
AKA-76	Soviet Navy	World War II: Kerch-Eltigen Operation: The G-5-class motor torpedo boat was sunk by a mine or by German coastal guns off Eltigen, in the Black Sea, with the loss of ten lives.
USS McKean	United States Navy	World War II: The high-speed transport, a former Wickes-class destroyer, was torpedoed and sunk in the Solomon Sea 19 nautical miles (35 km) south west of Cape Torokina, Bougainville Island (06°31′S 154°52′E) by a Mitsubishi G4M aircraft of the Imperial Japanese Navy Air Service. 64 of her complement and 52 of her embarked troops were killed. Survivors were rescued by USS Sigourney and USS Talbot (both United States Navy).
Hie Maru	Imperial Japanese Navy	World War II: Convoy 2152: The Hikawa Maru-class auxiliary transport was torpedoed and sunk in the Pacific Ocean 385 nautical miles (713 km; 443 mi) south west of Truk, South Seas Mandate (01°45′N 148°45′E) by USS Drum (United States Navy). There were no casualties among the 3,000 troops aboard.
PVO-10	Soviet Navy	World War II: Kerch-Eltigen Operation: The PVO-10-class anti-aircraft motorboat was sunk by a mine off Eltigen, in the Black Sea. Nine crew members and 20 soldiers were killed.

== 18 November ==
List of shipwrecks: 18 November 1943
Ship	State	Description
Agios Demetrios	Greece	World War II: The sailing vessel (20 GRT) was shelled and sunk south-east of the Kassandra peninsula, Greece by HMS Sibyl (Royal Navy). The crew survived.
HMS Chanticleer	Royal Navy	World War II: Convoy MKS 30: The Black Swan-class sloop (1,350/1,880 t, 1943) was torpedoed and damaged in the Atlantic Ocean 250 nautical miles (460 km) east north east of the Azores, Portugal (40°06′N 19°48′W) by U-515 (Kriegsmarine) with the loss of 28 of her 192 crew. She was towed to Ponta Delgado where she was declared a total loss. Subsequently used as an accommodation ship at Horta. Scrapped in 1946.
Empire Dunstan	United Kingdom	World War II: The cargo ship (2,887 GRT, 1942) was torpedoed and sunk in the Ionian Sea, off Taranto, Italy (39°24′N 17°40′E) by U-81 (Kriegsmarine) with the loss of two of her 42 crew. Survivors were rescued by Lom (Norway).
Kanelos	Greece	World War II: The sailing vessel (20 GRT) was shelled and sunk off Strati, Greece by HMS Sibyl (Royal Navy). The crew survived.
No. 35	Soviet Navy	World War II: Kerch-Eltigen Operation: The motor boat was shelled and sunk in the Black Sea by Kriegsmarine MFPs.
Ruby	Colombia	World War II: The sailing trawler was shelled and sunk in the Caribbean Sea about 120 nautical miles (220 km) north of Colón, Panama by U-516 (Kriegsmarine) with the loss of four of her 11 crew.
Sambridge	United Kingdom	World War II: The Liberty ship (7,219 GRT, 1943) was torpedoed and sunk in the Gulf of Aden south east of Aden (11°25′N 47°25′E) by I-27 (Imperial Japanese Navy). The ship's second officer was taken as a prisoner of war. 11 gunners and 37 crewmen were rescued by Tarantia (United Kingdom) and HMS Teviot Bank (Royal Navy).
Sanae	Imperial Japanese Navy	World War II: The Wakatake-class destroyer was torpedoed and sunk in the Celebes Sea 90 nautical miles (170 km) south of Basilan Island (4°52′N 122°07′E) by USS Blackfish or USS Bluefish (both United States Navy).
U-718	Kriegsmarine	The Type VIIC submarine was accidentally rammed and sunk in the Baltic Sea (55°12′N 15°24′E) by U-476 (Kriegsmarine) with the loss of 43 of her 50 crew.

== 19 November ==
List of shipwrecks: 19 November 1943
Ship	State	Description
Aghios Antonios	Greece	World War II: The sailing vessel (128 GRT) was sunk in the Mediterranean Sea off Crete by ORP Sokół (Polish Navy). The ship was carrying 208 Italian prisoners of war and a crew of 11. All crew survived but 110 Italians were killed.
Daigen Maru	Japan	World War II: The cargo ship was bombed and sunk at Canton, China by Consolidated B-24 Liberator aircraft of the United States Fourteenth Air Force.
Giovanni Boccaccio	Italy	World War II: The cargo ship was torpedoed and damaged in the Aegean Sea off Monemvasia, Greece by HMS Sickle (Royal Navy). She was beached and was declared a constructive total loss.
Hokko Maru	Japan	World War II: Convoy No. 4114: The cargo ship was torpedoed and sunk in the Pacific Ocean north east of Asuncion Island, Mariana Islands (22°27′N 147°15′E) by USS Harder (United States Navy). 21 passengers and 24 crew were killed.
Konstantinos	Greece	World War II: The sailing vessel (140 GRT) was sunk in the Mediterranean Sea off Crete by ORP Sokół (Polish Navy). There were no casualty.
Möwe	Kriegsmarine	World War II: The guard ship was sunk in the Mediterranean Sea off Crete by ORP Sokół (Polish Navy). There were no casualties.
Nikko Maru	Japan	World War II: Convoy No. 4114: The Kinrei Maru-class ore carrier was torpedoed and damaged in the Pacific Ocean north east of Asuncion Island (24°47′N 147°20′E) by USS Harder (United States Navy). She sank the next day. 50 gunners and 45 crew were killed.
USS PT-147	United States Navy	World War II: The Elco 80' PT boat was run aground off Teliata Point, New Guinea and scuttled (05°55′S 147°20′E).
USS SC-1067	United States Navy	The SC-497-class submarine chaser was beached on Sugar Loaf Island off Attu Island in the Aleutian Islands during a storm. All her crew were removed without injury but she later sank.
USS Sculpin	United States Navy	World War II: The Sargo-class submarine was depth charged and damaged in the Pacific Ocean north of New Guinea by the destroyer Yamagumo (Imperial Japanese Navy). She was scuttled with the loss of 16 of her 54 crew.
U-211	Kriegsmarine	World War II: The Type VIIC submarine was depth charged and sunk in the Atlantic Ocean east of the Azores, Portugal (40°15′N 19°18′W) by a Vickers Wellington aircraft of 179 Squadron, Royal Air Force with the loss of all 54 hands.
Udo Maru	Japan	World War II: Convoy No. 4114: The cargo ship was torpedoed, broke in two, and sunk in the Pacific Ocean north east of Asuncion Island by USS Harder (United States Navy). Five crew were killed.

== 20 November ==
List of shipwrecks: 20 November 1943
Ship	State	Description
USS Discoverer	United States Navy	The Auk-class minesweeper ran aground off Prince Rupert Island, British Columbia and was severely damaged. She was later refloated, repaired and returned to service.
Drepanum	Germany	The cargo ship was sunk in a collision with the cargo ship Lippe (Germany) off the Vinga Lighthouse, Sweden. There were no casualties.
Evangelistria	Greece	World War II: The Greek caique was sunk off Suda Bay by gunfire from HMS Sportsman (Royal Navy).
F 386	Kriegsmarine	World War II: The Type A Marinefahrprahm was sunk by an air attack in the port of Kamysch Burun, Crimea. One crew was killed and one wounded.
Jela	Yugoslav Partisans	World War II: The three-masted schooner struck a mine and sank in the Adriatic Sea off Bari, Apulia, Italy (41°09′N 16°51′E).
No. 103	Soviet Navy	The No. 11-class landing tender was lost on this date.
Naples Maru	Imperial Japanese Army	World War II: The Daifuko Maru No. 1-class transport was bombed and sunk north of New Ireland (03°43′S 151°04′E) by a Consolidated PBY Catalina aircraft of the United States Navy. 121 troops and five crew were killed. Survivors were rescued by CH-17 and CH-18 (both Imperial Japanese Navy).
PSB&D Co. #5	United States	The 150-gross register ton, 78-foot (23.8 m) scow sank 10 nautical miles (19 km; 12 mi) west of the entrance buoy at the harbor at Yakutat, Territory of Alaska.
PSB&D Co. #8	United States	The 185-gross register ton, 99.8-foot (30.4 m) cargo scow sank 10 nautical miles (19 km; 12 mi) west of the entrance buoy at the harbor at Yakutat, Territory of Alaska.
USS PT-147	United States Navy	World War II: The PT boat ran aground off Teliata Point, New Guinea, and was destroyed to prevent capture.
U-536	Kriegsmarine	World War II: The Type IXC/40 submarine was depth charged and sunk in the Atlantic Ocean north east of the Azores, Portugal (43°50′N 19°39′W) by HMCS Calgary, HMCS Snowberry (both Royal Canadian Navy) and HMS Nene (Royal Navy) with the loss of 38 of her 55 crew.
U-768	Kriegsmarine	The Type VIIC submarine collided with U-745 (Kriegsmarine) in the Gulf of Danzig (54°30′N 19°15′E) and sank. All 44 crew survived.

== 21 November ==
List of shipwrecks: 21 November 1943
Ship	State	Description
Altair	United States	The cargo ship collided with Bostonian (United States) in Delaware Bay. Altair caught fire and was severely damaged with the loss of ten of her 43 crew. Declared a constructive total loss, she was scrapped.
Eizan Maru	Japan	World War II: The cargo ship was torpedoed and sunk in the East China Sea or Yellow Sea by USS Trigger (United States Navy).
Goryu Maru	Imperial Japanese Navy	World War II: The Peacetime Standard Type D auxiliary water tanker was bombed by United States Navy aircraft and started to sink in the Emidji lagoon. The vessel probably run aground that same day on the north side of Aineman Island. 17 crewmen and one gunner were killed. The vessel was bombed again in early December. The wreck was bombed again on 4 February 1944 by a PV-1 Ventura aircraft. The wreck was damaged again on 7 February.
Marsa	United Kingdom	World War II: The cargo ship (4,405 GRT, 1928) was sunk in the Atlantic Ocean by a Henschel Hs 293 glide bomb dropped by a Heinkel He 177 aircraft of II Staffeln, Kampfgeschwader 40, Luftwaffe with the loss of one of her 48 crew.
No. 402	Soviet Navy	The Project 1125 armored motor gunboat was lost on this date.
Nerucci	Germany	World War II: The cargo ship was torpedoed and sunk in the Mediterranean Sea off Livorno, Italy by Protée (Free French Naval Forces).
Nichii Maru	Imperial Japanese Navy	World War II: Convoy No. 1210: The Nichii Maru-class auxiliary ammunition ship was bombed, and set on fire, and abandoned in the Pacific Ocean east of Manus and west south west of Mussau Island, St. Mathias Island Group (01°55′S 149°00′E) by Consolidated B-24 Liberator aircraft. Her commanding officer and four crewmen were killed. She sank on 25 November.
PVO-22	Soviet Navy	The PVO-10-class anti-aircraft motorboat was lost on this date.
PVO-12 and PVO-20	Soviet Navy	World War II: Kerch-Eltigen Operation: The PVO-10-class anti-aircraft motorboats were sunk in the Black Sea by German shore batteries.
Shinko Maru	Japan	World War II: The trawler was bombed and sunk off Taberfane, New Guinea by Consolidated B-24 Liberator and North American B-25 Mitchell aircraft of the United States Army Air Force, and also by Bristol Beaufighter aircraft of the Royal Australian Air Force.
Shinwa Maru	Japan	World War II: The cargo ship was bombed and sunk at Manokwri, New Guinea by Consolidated B-24 Liberator and North American B-25 Mitchell aircraft of the United States Army Air Force.
Suisan Maru	Japan	World War II: The cargo ship was sunk off the south coast of New Britain by Douglas Boston aircraft of the Royal Australian Air Force.
U-284	Kriegsmarine	World War II: The Type VIIC submarine was scuttled in the Atlantic Ocean southeast of Greenland after suffering storm damage. All 49 crew survived.
U-538	Kriegsmarine	World War II: The Type IXC/40 submarine was depth charged and sunk in the Atlantic Ocean south west of Ireland (45°40′N 19°35′W) by HMS Crane and HMS Foley (both Royal Navy) with the loss of all 55 crew.

== 22 November ==
List of shipwrecks: 22 November 1943
Ship	State	Description
Arcturus	Germany	World War II: The cargo ship (1,632 GRT, 1892) was bombed and damaged in the North Sea south west of Ålesund, Norway by Bristol Beaufighter aircraft of 144 Squadron, Royal Air Force and 404 Squadron, Royal Canadian Air Force with the loss of four crew. She was taken in tow but was torpedoed and sunk by Ula (Royal Norwegian Navy) with the loss of four more crew.
HMS Barflake	Royal Navy	World War II: The Bar-class boom defence vessel (730/875 t, 1942) struck a mine and sank in the Adriatic Sea off Naples, Italy. Three crewmen were killed.
Daishu Maru	Japan	World War II: The cargo ship was torpedoed and sunk in the Pacific Ocean by USS Seahorse (United States Navy).
Empire Arthur	United Kingdom	The Empire Cadet-class coastal tanker (784 GRT, 1942) capsized in the port of Freetown, Sierra Leone. Two crewmen died. She was subsequently secured in a capsized condition alongside the wreck of the Liberty ship Flora Macdonald (United States) and declared a constructive total loss. She was salvaged in 1948 and returned to service in 1949.
HMS Hebe	Royal Navy	World War II: The Halcyon-class minesweeper struck a mine laid by U-453 (Kriegsmarine)and sank in the Adriatic Sea off Bari, Apulia, Italy (41°08′N 16°52′E). 35 of her 105 crew were killed and two more died of wounds later.
Kashima Maru	Imperial Japanese Navy	World War II: The repair ship struck a mine and sank in the Pacific Ocean off Macao.
Kanayamasan Maru	Imperial Japanese Navy	World War II: Convoy No. 1210: The Peacetime Standard Type C auxiliary transport ship (a.k.a. Kinyamasan Maru) was bombed and sunk in the Pacific Ocean 70 nautical miles (130 km) north north west of Mussau Island, St. Matthias Islands, Papua New Guinea (01°00′N 149°20′E) by Consolidated B-24 Liberator aircraft. Two crewmen were killed.
Kiso Maru	Japan	World War II: The cargo ship was torpedoed and sunk in the Pacific Ocean off Palau (5°46′N 108°26′E) by USS Tinosa (United States Navy).
HNoMS MTB 626	Royal Norwegian Navy	The Fairmile D motor torpedo boat (102/118 t, 1942) destroyed by an accidental explosion at Lerwick, Shetland Islands. One man was killed and six wounded.
HMS MTB 686	Royal Navy	The Fairmile D motor torpedo boat (102/118 t, 1942) was destroyed by an accidental explosion at Lerwick, Shetland Islands. Seven crew were killed or died of wounds.
Unnamed floating dock	Kriegsmarine	World War II: The floating dock was torpedoed and sunk by Torbay (Royal Navy) north of Skiathos Island, Greece.
W45, W47 and W48	Royal Navy	World War II: The Welman submarines were scuttled at Bergen, Norway during a failed attempt to sink a floating dock there.
Yamato Maru	Japan	World War II: The cargo ship was torpedoed and sunk in the Pacific Ocean off Palau by USS Tinosa (United States Navy).

== 23 November ==
List of shipwrecks: 23 November 1943
Ship	State	Description
Alma	Germany	World War II: The cargo ship struck a mine and sank off Naxos, Greece.
Elena	Royal Romanian Navy	The tug sank in a storm with all hands off Snake Island in the Black Sea.
Elizabeth Kellogg	United States	World War II: The tanker was torpedoed and sunk in the Caribbean Sea 150 nautical miles (280 km) north of Cristóbal, Panama (11°10′N 80°42′W) by U-516 (Kriegsmarine) with the loss of two gunners and eight crew. Survivors were rescued by USS SC-1017 (United States Navy) and USAT Y-10 (United States Army).
F 536	Kriegsmarine	The Type C Marinefahrprahm foundered in a storm off Odesa (46°28′N 31°07′E) with the loss of four crew.
I-35	Imperial Japanese Navy	World War II: The Type B submarine was depth charged by USS Frazier and USS Meade, shelled by USS Tennessee (all United States Navy) and then rammed and sunk west of Betio, Tarawa (01°22′N 172°47′E) by USS Frazier, with a loss of 92 of 95 crew members. The three survivors rescued by USS Frazier and USS Meade, a fourth crewman survived the sinking but was killed when he opened fire on the rescue party.
Kizam Maru	Japan	World War II: The cargo ship was torpedoed and sunk in the Pacific Ocean off Halmahera, Netherlands East Indies by USS Capelin (United States Navy).
Marie Mad	(France) French Navy	World War II: The auxiliary minesweeper was sunk by a mine off Ajaccio, Corsica, France with all 24 hands.
Michigan	Canada	The lighter barge (1,730 GRT, 1890) was wrecked on Lottie Wolf Shoal off Hope Island, Georgian Bay, Lake Huron in a gale while lightering the cargo of the wrecked Riverton (Canada). She broke in two, a total loss. Crew rescued by the tug Favorite (Canada).
Nekka Maru	Imperial Japanese Army	World War II: Convoy HI-21: The cargo liner was torpedoed and sunk in the East China Sea south of Shushan Island (28°49′N 122°11′E) by USS Gudgeon (United States Navy). 387 of the 1,413 troops and crew aboard were killed.
USS PT-322	United States Navy	World War II: The Elco 80' PT boat was run aground off Hardenberg Point, New Guinea and scuttled (06°09′S 147°36′E).
PVO-27	Soviet Navy	World War II: Kerch-Eltigen Operation: The PVO-10-class anti-aircraft motorboat was lost when beached following being shelled and damaged by MFPs.
SG 21	Kriegsmarine	World War II: The escort, a salvaged former Chamois-class aviso/minesweeper, was bombed and sunk by Allied aircraft at Toulon. Later raised again by the Germans.
HMS Santa	Royal Navy	World War II: The naval whaler (355 GRT, 1936) was sunk by a mine off La Maddalena, Sardinia, Italy.
Santa Fé	Kriegsmarine	World War II: The transport ship was torpedoed and sunk by L-4 (Soviet Navy) off Yevpatoria, Soviet Union (45°05′N 33°16′E). 28 of her crew were killed and 16 were missing.
Wakamiya	Imperial Japanese Navy	World War II: Convoy HI-21: The Etorofu-class escort ship was torpedoed, blew up, broke in half and sunk in the East China Sea south of Shushan Island (28°38′N 122°09′E) by USS Gudgeon (United States Navy). 131 of the 135 crew were killed.
Weissenberg	Germany	World War II: The tanker was bombed and sunk in the North Sea off Texel, North Holland, Netherlands (53°10′N 4°50′E) by Royal Air Force aircraft.

== 24 November ==
List of shipwrecks: 24 November 1943
Ship	State	Description
Achéron	Kriegsmarine	World War II: The Redoutable-class submarine was bombed and sunk at Toulon, Var by United States Army Air Force aircraft.
Aigle	Kriegsmarine	World War II: The Aigle-class destroyer was bombed and sunk at Toulon by United States Army Air Force bombers. The wreck was later salvaged and scrapped.
Aude	Kriegsmarine	World War II: The transport ship was bombed and sunk at Toulon by United States Army Air Force aircraft.
Belle Isle	Kriegsmarine	World War II: The experimental ship was bombed and set afire at Toulon, Var, France by United States Army Air Force aircraft.
Eisstrom	Germany	World War II: The cargo ship (943 GRT, 1939) was torpedoed and sunk off Ålesund, Norway by Ula (Royal Norwegian Navy). One crew was lost.
FR 11	Kriegsmarine	World War II: The La Galissonnière-class cruiser, 85% rebuilt after being scuttled a year earlier, was bombed and sunk at Toulon by United States Army Air Force aircraft.
FR 53	Kriegsmarine	World War II: The Chamois-class aviso was bombed and sunk at Toulon by United States Army Air Force aircraft.
John P. Gaines	United States	The Liberty ship broke in two in the North Pacific Ocean southwest of Chirikof Island and south of Kodiak Island at either 55°07′N 155°30′W. A boat went missing with the 10 men aboard and was never found. Her bow section sank, while her stern section was beached on the coast of the Territory of Alaska.
USS Liscome Bay	United States Navy	World War II: The Casablanca-class escort carrier was torpedoed and sunk in the Pacific Ocean off Makin, Gilbert Islands by I-175 (Imperial Japanese Navy). There were 644 dead and 272 survivors.
HMS MTB 73	Royal Navy	World War II: The Vosper 72 foot-class motor torpedo boat (39/47 t, 1941) was sunk by German bombers in the port of La Maddalena, Sardinia, Italy. Two crewmen were killed.
Melville E. Stone	United States	World War II: The Liberty ship was torpedoed and sunk in the Caribbean 100 nautical miles (190 km) north west of Cristobal, Panama (10°36′N 80°19′W) by U-516 (Kriegsmarine) with the loss of one passenger, two gunners and 12 crew of the 88 people on board. Survivors were rescued by USS SC-662 and USS SC-1023 (both United States Navy).
Naïade	Kriegsmarine	World War II: The Sirène-class submarine was bombed and sunk at Toulon by United States Army Air Force aircraft.
R-1	Kriegsmarine	World War II: The Type R-1 minesweeper was sunk by Allied aircraft at Toulon, France. Raised and scrapped.
R-3	Kriegsmarine	World War II: The Type R-2 minesweeper was sunk by Allied aircraft at Toulon, France. Raised and scrapped.
S 56	Kriegsmarine	World War II: The E-boat was sunk by aircraft in the Toulon shipyard, France.
TA12	Kriegsmarine	World War II: The La Melpomène-class torpedo boat was bombed and sunk at Toulon by Boeing B-17 Flying Fortress aircraft of the United States Army Air Forces.
Vs 119 Sophie Regina	Kriegsmarine	The naval trawler/Vorpostenboot was lost on this date.
Volta	French Navy	World War II: The Mogador-class destroyer, previously scuttled at Toulon, France, and raised in May 1943 but left unrepaired, was bombed and sunk at Toulon by United States Army Air Forces aircraft.

== 25 November ==
List of shipwrecks: 25 November 1943
Ship	State	Description
Casablanca	Germany	The cargo ship foundered in the Baltic Sea with the loss of all but two of her crew.
F 150	Kriegsmarine	World War II: The Type A Marinefährprahm was damaged beyond repair by an underwater explosion in Civitavecchia harbour. Two crewmen were killed and one wounded.
I-19	Imperial Japanese Navy	World War II: The Type B1 submarine was depth charged and sunk in the Pacific Ocean 50 nautical miles (93 km) west of Makin Island (03°10′N 177°55′E) by USS Radford (United States Navy) with the loss of all 105 crew.
Kenzan Maru	Imperial Japanese Army	World War II: Convoy SO-?: The Kenzan Maru-class auxiliary transport was torpedoed and sunk in the Pacific Ocean (00°51′N 146°00′E) by USS Albacore (United States Navy). Seven crew were killed.
Kilstraum	Norway	World War II: The coaster (155 GRT, 1891) was sunk off Kya, Norway, by HNoMS MTB 668 (Royal Norwegian Navy) and HMMTB 669 (Royal Navy).
HMMTB 668	Royal Navy	World War II: The motor torpedo boat was attacked in the North Sea by Luftwaffe aircraft and was abandoned by her crew.
Makinami	Imperial Japanese Navy	World War II: Battle of Cape St. George: The Yūgumo-class destroyer was torpedoed and sunk in the Pacific Ocean off Cape St. George, New Ireland by USS Charles Ausburne (United States Navy).
Ōnami	Imperial Japanese Navy	World War II: Battle of Cape St. George: The Yūgumo-class destroyer was torpedoed and sunk in the Pacific Ocean off Cape St. George by USS Charles Ausburne (United States Navy).
Onoe Maru	Japan	World War II: The cargo ship was torpedoed and sunk in the Bismarck Sea by USS Raton (United States Navy).
Ro-100	Imperial Japanese Navy	World War II: The Ro-100-class submarine was sunk by a mine north east of Buin. 38 crew were killed; 12 survived.
Toa Maru	Imperial Japanese Navy	World War II: The tanker was torpedoed and sunk in the Pacific Ocean 100 nautical miles (190 km) north of Seniavina Island, Ponape, Mariana Islands (08°22′N 158°00′E) by USS Searaven (United States Navy). Three gunners and 15 crew were killed. 117 survivors were rescued by Akigumo (Imperial Japanese Navy).
U-600	Kriegsmarine	World War II: The Type VIIC submarine was depth charged and sunk in the Atlantic Ocean off the Azores, Portugal (40°31′N 22°07′W) by HMS Bazely and HMS Blackwood (both Royal Navy) with the loss of all 54 crew.
U-849	Kriegsmarine	World War II: The Type IXD2 submarine was depth charged and sunk in the South Atlantic off the Congo Estuary (6°30′S 5°40′W) by a Consolidated B-24 Liberator aircraft of the United States Navy with the loss of all 63 crew.
Volga-Don	Romania	World War II: The coaster was torpedoed in the Black Sea west off Yevpatoria by L-6 (Soviet Navy) and sank the next day three miles off Yevpatoria while being towed to this port.
Yūgiri	Imperial Japanese Navy	World War II: Battle of Cape St. George: The Fubuki-class destroyer was shelled and sunk in the Pacific Ocean off Cape St. George, New Ireland by USS Charles Ausburne, USS Claxton and USS Dyson (all United States Navy). I-177 and I-181 (both Imperial Japanese Navy) rescued 289 survivors.

== 26 November ==
List of shipwrecks: 26 November 1943
Ship	State	Description
Genchi Maru	Imperial Japanese Navy	World War II: The auxiliary minesweeper was bombed and sunk in the Pacific Ocean off Canton, China by North American B-25 Mitchell aircraft of the United States Fourteenth Air Force.
I-39	Imperial Japanese Navy	World War II: The Type B1 submarine was detected, depth charged, and sunk in the Pacific Ocean southwest of Makin Island, part of the northern Gilbert Islands, by USS Boyd (United States Navy).
Morar	United Kingdom	World War II: The cargo ship (1,507 GRT, 1924) struck a mine and sank in the Humber Estuary.
Nikkai Maru	Imperial Japanese Navy	World War II: The Shinkyo Maru-class auxiliary transport was torpedoed, broke into three pieces, and sank in the Pacific Ocean 210 nautical miles (390 km) south south west of Puluwat Island, Caroline Islands (04°12′N 148°26′E) by USS Ray (United States Navy).
Ogurasan Maru	Japan	World War II: Convoy No. 444: The Imperial Japanese Army-chartered Type 1TM tanker was torpedoed and sunk in the South China Sea 16 nautical miles (30 km) east of Baie de Xuau, Annam, French Indochina (13°25′N 109°30′E) by USS Bowfin (United States Navy). 30 crew were killed.
Onoe Maru	Imperial Japanese Navy	World War II: The Onoe Maru-class auxiliary transport was torpedoed and sunk in the Pacific Ocean north west of Kavieng (00°40′N 148°20′E) by USS Raton (United States Navy). One crewman was killed, her commander and 195 crew were rescued by CH-40 (Imperial Japanese Navy).
PVO-11, PVO-13 and PVO-26	Soviet Navy	World War II: Kerch-Eltigen Operation: The PVO-10-class anti-aircraft motorboats was shelled and damaged in the Black Sea by Kriegsmarine MFPs, then beached. Later refloated, repaired and returned to service. There is conflicting information on whether the sunk boat was PVO-24 or PVO-26. 41 killed and 30 wounded between the vessels.
PVO-24	Soviet Navy	World War II: Kerch-Eltigen Operation: The PVO-10-class anti-aircraft motorboat was shelled, rammed and sunk in the Black Sea by Kriegsmarine MFPs. There were no survivors among the 9 crew and 11 soldiers aboard.
Rohna	Royal Navy	World War II: Convoy KMF-26A: The troopship (8,602 GRT, 1926) was bombed and sunk in the Mediterranean Sea off Jidelli, Algeria by a Henschel Hs 293 glide bomb from a Heinkel He 177 aircraft of II Staffeln, Kampfgeschwader 40, Luftwaffe. 1,015 troops, 11 gunners, one hospital orderly and 122 crew were killed. 660 survivors were rescued by USS Pioneer (United States Navy).
Shini Maru	Japan	World War II: The cargo ship was torpedoed and sunk in the Pacific Ocean between Palau and Truk by USS Tinosa (United States Navy).
Tainan Maru or Tonan Maru	Japan	World War II: Convoy No. 444: The ship was torpedoed and sunk in the South China Sea 16 mi (26 km) east of Baie de Xuau, Annam, French Indochina (13°25′N 109°30′E) by USS Bowfin (United States Navy). 24 crew killed.

== 27 November ==
List of shipwrecks: 27 November 1943
Ship	State	Description
Buenos Aires Maru	Imperial Japanese Army	(Red Cross): World War II: The Buenos Aires Maru-class auxiliary hospital ship was bombed and sunk in the Steffen Strait between New Hanover Island and New Ireland, off St. Matthias Island, (02°40′S 149°20′E) by a Consolidated B-24 Liberator aircraft. Survivors were rescued by Imperial Japanese Navy submarine chasers on 3 December. 158 men and nurses were killed in the sinking or in the lifeboats.
Gouverneur General Van Vollenhoven	(France) Vichy French	World War II: The cargo ship was torpedoed and sunk off Cap Varella, French Indochina by USS Bowfin (United States Navy). There was only one survivor.
Hakone Maru	Imperial Japanese Army	World War II: Convoy No. 222: The Hakone Maru-class auxiliary transport was bombed and sunk south east of Foochow, China (25°04′N 119°40′E) by North American B-25 Mitchell aircraft of the United States Fourteenth Air Force. There were no casualties. Hawaii Maru (Japan) rescued about 900 survivors.
HMML 126	Royal Navy	World War II: The Fairmile B motor launch (76/86 t, 1940) was badly damaged by an explosion (probably a mine) off Naples, Italy. There was no casualty but she was a total loss.
Palma	Germany	World War II: The cargo ship was torpedoed and sunk in the Mediterranean Sea off Lemnos, Greece by HMS Torbay (Royal Navy). There were 84 dead and 171 survivors.
San Ramon Maru	Imperial Japanese Navy	World War II: The San Ramon Maru-class oiler was torpedoed and sunk in the Pacific Ocean (33°35′N 128°45′E) by USS Seahorse (United States Navy). 3 gunners and 28 crew were killed.
Scotia	Norway	World War II: The tanker (9,972 GRT, 1939) was torpedoed and sunk in the Indian Ocean (03°00′S 69°08′E) by I-37 (Imperial Japanese Navy) with the loss of eight of her 40 crew when I-37 machine gunned the lifeboats. Survivors were rescued by HMT Okapi (Royal Navy).
V 1340	Kriegsmarine	World War II: The Vorpostenboot was bombed and sunk at Noordwijk, North Holland, Netherlands by British aircraft.

== 28 November ==
List of shipwrecks: 28 November 1943
Ship	State	Description
Beryl	Vichy France	World War II: The coaster was torpedoed and sunk in the Pacific Ocean about 35 nautical miles (65 km; 40 mi) north of Cam Ranh Bay, French Indochina by USS Bowfin (United States Navy).
F 594	Kriegsmarine	World War II: The Type C2A Marinefährprahm was sunk by an air attack in the port of Kamysch Burun, Crimea. There was no casualty.
Filippo Corridoni	Italy	World War II: The ferry was sunk at Zara by North American B-25 Mitchell aircraft of the United States Army Air Force. Between 30 and 60 passengers were killed.
Hokko Maru	Japan	World War II: Convoy SO-505: The cargo ship was torpedoed and sunk in the Bismarck Sea (01°40′N 141°51′E) by USS Raton (United States Navy). One soldier and three crew were killed.
Sebenico	Italy	World War II: The passenger ship was bombed and sunk at Zara by British aircraft.
Sydney Maru	Imperial Japanese Army	World War II: Convoy No. 340: The Sydney Maru-class transport was torpedoed and sunk in the South China Sea off French Indochina (12°50′N 109°35′E) by USS Bowfin (United States Navy). Five gunners and 38 crew were killed. Survivors were rescued by CH-9 (Imperial Japanese Navy).
Tonan Maru	Japan	World War II: Convoy No. 340: The Imperial Japanese Army shared use tanker was torpedoed and sunk in the South China Sea off French Indochina (12°50′N 109°35′E) by USS Bowfin (United States Navy). 49 survivors were rescued by CH-9 (Imperial Japanese Navy). 84 crew were killed.
U-542	Kriegsmarine	World War II: The Type IXC/40 submarine was depth charged and sunk in the Atlantic Ocean north of Madeira, Portugal (39°03′N 16°25′W) by a Vickers Wellington aircraft of 179 Squadron, Royal Air Force with the loss of all 56 crew.
Yamafuku Maru	Imperial Japanese Navy	World War II: Convoy No. 3123: The Tarushima Maru-class auxiliary transport was torpedoed and sunk in the Pacific Ocean off the Mariana Islands (18°21′N 140°08′E) by USS Snook (United States Navy). 60 crew were killed.
Yuri Maru	Japan	World War II: Convoy SO-505: The cargo ship was torpedoed and sunk in the Bismarck Sea (01°40′N 141°51′E) by USS Raton (United States Navy). 38 troops of the Imperial Japanese Army 2nd Debarkation Unit and 14 crew were killed. 180 survivors were rescued by Columbia Maru (Imperial Japanese Army).

== 29 November ==
List of shipwrecks: 29 November 1943
Ship	State	Description
Athenia Livanos	Greece	World War II: The cargo ship (4,824 GRT, 1936) was torpedoed and sunk in the Gulf of Aden by I-27 (Imperial Japanese Navy) (12°23′N 44°00′E). Two passengers and nine crewmen were killed.
I-21	Imperial Japanese Navy	World War II: The Type B submarine was probably torpedoed and sunk in the Pacific Ocean off of Tarawa by Grumman TBF Avenger aircraft from USS Chenango (United States Navy) with the loss of all 101 crew.
Kenryu Maru	Imperial Japanese Navy	World War II: Convoy 3128: The Kaihei Maru-class auxiliary transport was torpedoed in the Pacific Ocean about 15 nautical miles (28 km; 17 mi) northwest of Hachijo-Jima, Izu Shoto, off Honshū (33°19′N 139°34′E) by USS Snapper (United States Navy). Burning furiously, she was abandoned and sank the next day (33°16′N 139°35′E). Four crewmen were killed.
Manju Maru	Imperial Japanese Army	World War II: The Imperial Japanese Army-requisitioned cargo ship was torpedoed and sunk in the Pacific Ocean north west of the Mariana Islands (18°34′N 139°58′E) by USS Pargo (United States Navy). Three crewmen, two gunners and one passenger were killed.
USS Perkins	United States Navy	The Mahan-class destroyer was in a collision with the troopship Duntroon ( (Australia) Australian Army) in the Pacific Ocean 2 nautical miles (3.7 km) off Ipoteto Island, New Guinea and sank with the loss of four lives.
Shiganoura Maru	Imperial Japanese Navy	World War II: The Imperial Japanese Navy-requisitioned cargo ship was torpedoed and sunk in the Pacific Ocean off the Mariana Islands (18°24′N 139°51′E) by USS Snook (United States Navy). There were no casualties.
Suez Maru	Imperial Japanese Army	World War II: The Yoshida Maru No. 2-class cargo liner was torpedoed and sunk in the Java Sea north of Bali, Netherlands East Indies (06°20′S 116°30′E) by USS Bonefish (United States Navy) while transporting sick Japanese personnel and prisoners of war (PoWs). 850 PoWs and 69 Japanese were killed in the sinking. 205 Japanese troops and 93 crew were rescued by W-12 (Imperial Japanese Navy); she then massacred the surviving 200–250 PoWs in the water.
Trevorian	United Kingdom	The cargo ship (4,599 GRT, 1920) was sunk in a collision with the fishing trawler Oli Garda (Iceland) off Girdleness, Aberdeenshire. There were no casualties.
U-86	Kriegsmarine	World War II: The Type VIIB submarine was sunk in the Atlantic Ocean east of the Azores (40°52′N 18°54′W) by HMS Tumult and HMS Rocket (both Royal Navy) with the loss of all 50 crew.
V 1227	Kriegsmarine	The KFK 2-class naval drifter/Vorpostenboot disappeared off Grådyb, Denmark, during a storm with her whole crew (16 to 18 men).

== 30 November ==
List of shipwrecks: 30 November 1943
Ship	State	Description
Columbia Maru	Imperial Japanese Army	World War II: Convoy SO-505: The Columbia Maru-class transport was torpedoed and sunk in the Pacific Ocean north of the Bismarck Archipelago, New Guinea (01°26′N 148°20′E) by USS Gato (United States Navy). One crewman was killed. Survivors were rescued by CH-24 (Imperial Japanese Navy).
F 306	Kriegsmarine	World War II: The Type A Marinefährprahm was sunk by an air attack in the port of Kamysch Burun, Crimea.
F 341	Kriegsmarine	World War II: The Type A Marinefährprahm was lost after running aground in Kerch Strait and being shelled by artillery.
F 574	Kriegsmarine	World War II: The Type A Marinefährprahm was lost after running aground in Kerch Strait and being shelled by artillery.
Fort de Vaux	France	World War II: The cargo ship was torpedoed and sunk in the Atlantic Ocean (6°32′N 12°20′W) by U-68 (Kriegsmarine). All 61 crew survived.
Himalaya Maru	Imperial Japanese Army	World War II: The Somedono Maru-class troopship was bombed and sunk in the Bismarck Sea south of New Hanover (02°47′S 150°25′E) by United States Navy Consolidated PBY Catalina aircraft. Two comfort women, 27 troops and six crew were killed.

== Unknown date ==
List of shipwrecks: Unknown date 1943
Ship	State	Description
HMS Attendant	Royal Navy	The armed yacht (357 GRT, 1913) was lost some time in November.
BKA-132	Soviet Navy	World War II: The torpedo boat was lost in the Black Sea in action against German forces between 1 and 11 November.
USS Capelin	United States Navy	World War II: The Balao-class submarine was lost in the Celebes Sea on active service. She may have struck a mine and sank on 23 November. All 60 crew were lost.
Hondo	United Kingdom	The 119.2-foot (36.3 m), 229-ton trawler vanished after last being seen off Barra Head on 24 November. Lost with all 14 hands.
I-40	Imperial Japanese Navy	World War II: The Type B2 submarine was never heard from again after she departed Truk on 22 November 1943 bound for a patrol area in the Pacific Ocean off Makin Island.
Kamoi Maru	Japan	World War II: The cargo ship was torpedoed and sunk in the Pacific Ocean by USS Raton (United States Navy) on 26 or 28 November.
KT-173	Soviet Navy	World War II: The torpedo boat was lost in the Black Sea in action against German forces between 1 and 11 November.
KT-411	Soviet Navy	World War II: The torpedo boat was lost in the Black Sea in action against German forces between 1 and 11 November.
KT-509	Soviet Navy	World War II: The torpedo boat was lost in the Black Sea in action against German forces between 1 and 11 November.
HMS LCM 181	Royal Navy	The landing craft mechanized was lost some time in November.
HMS LCP(M) 14,	Royal Navy	The landing craft, personnel (mortar) was lost some time in November.
No. 14	Soviet Navy	The No. 11-class landing tender was lost sometime in November.
PVO-26	Soviet Navy	The PVO-10-class anti-aircraft motorboat was lost on 15 November, or damaged and lost by beaching on 26 November.
HMS Simoom	Royal Navy	World War II: The S-class submarine (842/990 t, 1943) was lost in the western Mediterranean sometime between 2 and 15 November. All 48 crew were lost.
SKA-0105	Soviet Navy	World War II: The patrol boat was lost in the Black Sea in action against German forces between 1 and 11 November.
SKA-0114	Soviet Navy	World War II: The patrol boat was lost in the Black Sea in action against German forces between 1 and 11 November.
SKA-0135	Soviet Navy	World War II: The patrol boat was lost in the Black Sea in action against German forces between 1 and 11 November.
SKA-0158	Soviet Navy	World War II: The patrol boat was lost in the Black Sea in action against German forces between 1 and 11 November.
SKA-0178	Soviet Navy	World War II: The patrol boat was lost in the Black Sea in action against German forces between 1 and 11 November.
SKA-0192	Soviet Navy	World War II: The patrol boat was lost in the Black Sea in action against German forces between 1 and 11 November.
SKA-01012	Soviet Navy	World War II: The patrol boat was torpedoed and in the Black Sea by Kriegsmarine Schnellboote between 1 and 11 November.
TKA-101	Soviet Navy	World War II: The torpedo boat was torpedoed and sunk in the Black Sea by Kriegsmarine Schnellboote between 1 and 11 November.
U-648	Kriegsmarine	World War II: The Type VIIC submarine was lost on patrol in the Atlantic Ocean on or after 28 November with the loss of all 50 crew. Cause unknown, possibly struck a mine.

== Notes ==
^[Note 1] Task Force 39 comprised USS Charles Ausburne, USS Claxton, USS Cleveland, USS Columbia, USS Converse, USS Dyson, USS Foote, USS Montpelier, USS Denver, USS Spence, USS Stanly and USS Thatcher.
