= HMS Sickle =

British S-class submarine

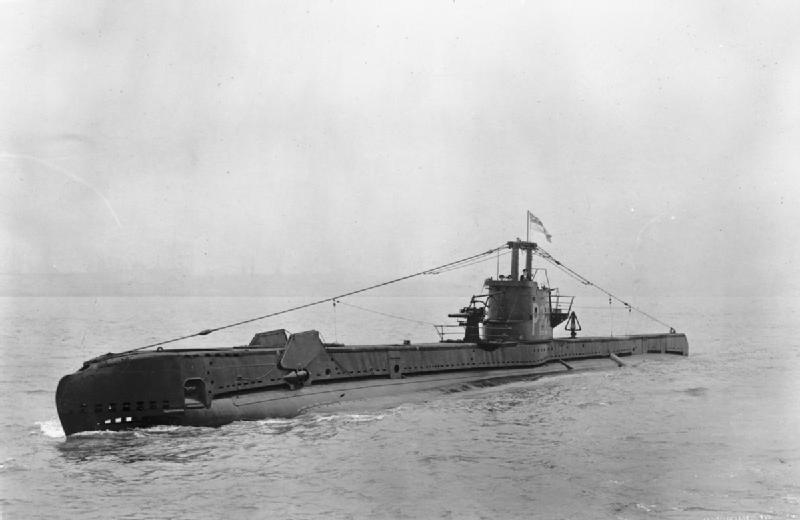
- Sickle on the surface

History

United Kingdom
- Name: Sickle
- Namesake: Sickle
- Ordered: 2 September 1940
- Builder: Cammell Laird, Birkenhead
- Laid down: 8 May 1941
- Launched: 27 August 1942
- Commissioned: 1 December 1942
- Fate: Missing after 14 June 1944
- Badge

General characteristics
- Class & type: S-class submarine
- Displacement: 865 long tons (879 t) (surfaced); 990 long tons (1,010 t) (submerged)
- Length: 217 ft (66.1 m)
- Beam: 23 ft 9 in (7.2 m)
- Draught: 14 ft 8 in (4.5 m)
- Installed power: 1,900 bhp (1,400 kW) (diesel); 1,300 hp (970 kW) (electric)
- Propulsion: 2 × diesel engines; 2 × electric motors
- Speed: 15 kn (28 km/h; 17 mph) (surfaced); 10 kn (19 km/h; 12 mph) (submerged)
- Range: 6,000 nmi (11,000 km; 6,900 mi) at 10 knots (19 km/h; 12 mph) (surfaced); 120 nmi (220 km; 140 mi) at 3 knots (5.6 km/h; 3.5 mph) (submerged)
- Test depth: 300 ft (91.4 m)
- Complement: 48
- Sensors & processing systems: Type 129AR or 138 ASDIC; Type 291 early-warning radar
- Armament: 7 × 21 in (533 mm) torpedo tubes (6 × bow, 1 × stern); 1 × 3 in (76 mm) deck gun; 1 × 20 mm (0.8 in) AA gun

HMS Sickle was a third-batch S-class submarine built for the Royal Navy during World War II. Completed in 1942, she made her initial war patrol off the Norwegian coast. Sickle then sailed to Gibraltar, from where she conducted one patrol, then to Algiers, French North Africa. From 10 May to 10 October, the boat patrolled the Gulf of Genoa five times and sank a German submarine as well as three minesweepers and an escort ship. She then moved to Beirut, French Lebanon, and conducted two patrols in the Aegean Sea, sinking three caïques and a merchant ship, in addition to landing resistance operatives in Greece.

On her second patrol from Beirut, Sickle's electric motors were damaged during an attack by two destroyers, so she sailed to Gibraltar for repairs. Several months later, the boat returned to service and conducted two patrols in the Aegean, sinking another three caïques, a sailing vessel, and a merchant ship. On 31 May 1944, Sickle departed Malta for a patrol in the Aegean and did not return. It is considered probable that she hit mines on her way back to Malta around 16–18 June 1944.

== Design and description ==
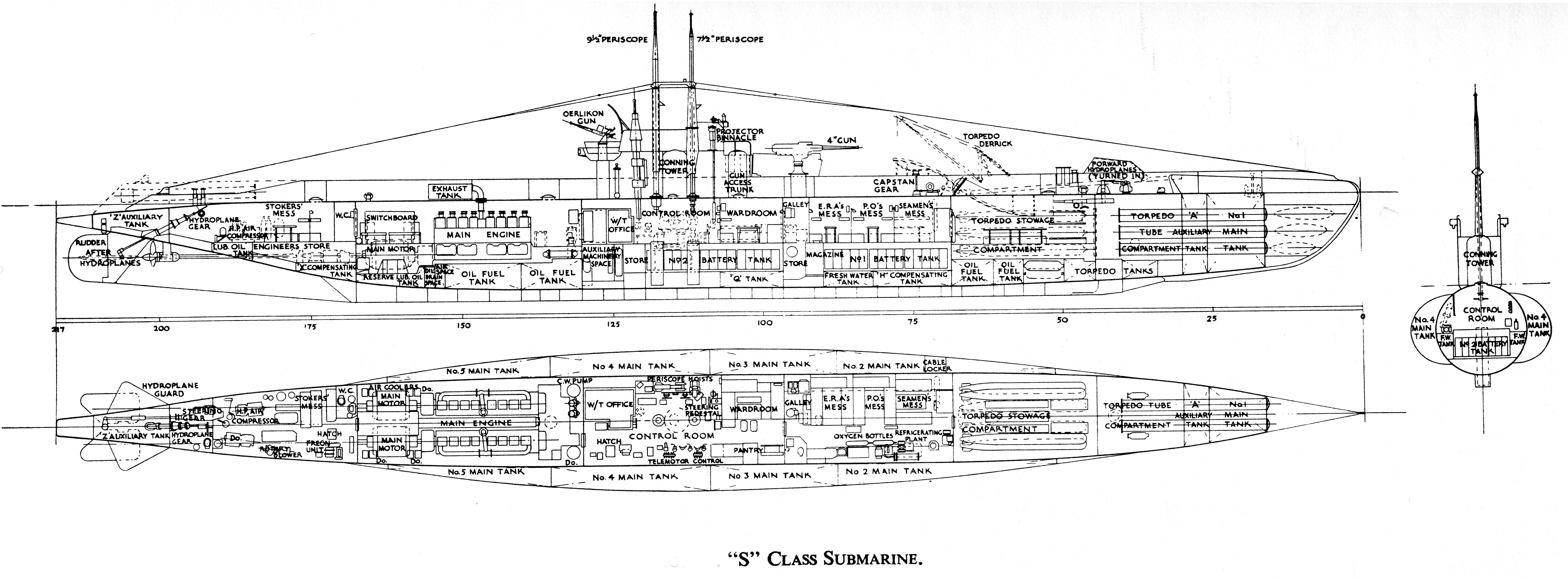
Schematic drawing of a S-class submarine

The S-class submarines were designed to patrol the restricted waters of the North Sea and the Mediterranean Sea. The third batch was slightly enlarged and improved over the preceding second batch of the S class. The submarines had a length of 217 feet (66.1 m) overall, a beam of 23 feet 9 inches (7.2 m) and a draught of 14 feet 8 inches (4.5 m). They displaced 865 long tons (879 t) on the surface and 990 long tons (1,010 t) submerged. The S-class submarines had a crew of 48 officers and ratings. They had a diving depth of 300 feet (91 m).

For surface running, the boats were powered by two 950-brake-horsepower (708 kW) diesel engines, each driving one propeller shaft. When submerged each propeller was driven by a 650-horsepower (485 kW) electric motor. They could reach 15 knots (28 km/h; 17 mph) on the surface and 10 knots (19 km/h; 12 mph) underwater. On the surface, the third-batch boats had a range of 6,000 nautical miles (11,000 km; 6,900 mi) at 10 knots (19 km/h; 12 mph) and 120 nmi (220 km; 140 mi) at 3 knots (5.6 km/h; 3.5 mph) submerged.

The boats were armed with seven 21-inch (533 mm) torpedo tubes. Six of these were in the bow, and one external tube was mounted in the stern. They carried six reload torpedoes for the bow tubes for a total of thirteen torpedoes. Twelve mines could be carried in lieu of the internally stowed torpedoes. They were also armed with a 3-inch (76 mm) deck gun. It is uncertain if Sickle was completed with a 20-millimetre (0.8 in) Oerlikon light AA gun or had one added later. The third-batch S-class boats were fitted with either a Type 129AR or 138 ASDIC system and a Type 291 or 291W early-warning radar.

== Construction and career ==
HMS Sickle was a third-group S-class submarine and was ordered by the British Admiralty on 2 September 1940. She was laid down in the Cammell Laird shipyard in Birkenhead on 8 May 1941 and launched on 27 August 1942. On 28 November 1942, the boat, under the command of Lieutenant James Drummond, sailed to Holy Loch, where she was commissioned into the Royal Navy three days later. Thus far, Sickle has been the only ship to bear the name in the Royal Navy.

Between 11 and 31 January 1943, she conducted a war patrol off Norway, but sighted only another British submarine, HMS Trident. Sickle then sailed from Great Britain to Gibraltar on 6 April, with orders to intercept the Italian blockade runner Himalaya which was thought to be in the vicinity. Himalaya had stayed in port and the submarine proceeded on to Gibraltar as planned.

On 18 April 1943, she departed harbour to conduct a patrol off Valencia, Spain. Five days later, the boat sighted the Italian merchant ship Mauro Croce and fired two torpedoes; the torpedoes ran under the ship, so Sickle surfaced to use her deck gun. However, after firing 19 rounds and scoring several hits, her gun jammed and she had to break off the attack. The submarine ended her patrol in Algiers on 27 April.

=== Algiers ===
Sickle departed Algiers to patrol off southern France on 10 May 1943. After five days at sea, she attacked a German convoy south of Nice, France, and sank the German submarine chaser UJ-2213 which had been painted to appear like an oil tanker. The boat next attacked the German submarine U-755 with torpedoes on 20 May, but missed; U-755 was sunk eight days later by aircraft. The next day, Sickle attacked the German submarine U-303 off Toulon and hit it with two torpedoes; U-303 sank in half a minute. She then returned to Algiers on 25 May. After leaving on her next patrol on 16 June, Sickle unsuccessfully attacked an enemy submarine on 18 June, then returned to port on 1 July.

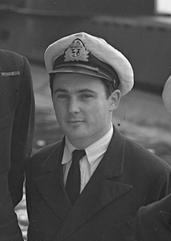
Sickle's captain Lieutenant James Drummond

On 13 July 1943, the boat departed Algiers to patrol in the Gulf of Genoa and east of Corsica. Four days later, Sickle fired three torpedoes at an Italian convoy without success. On 18 July, she sank with gunfire two Italian minesweepers, No. G.61 and No. R.164, east of Gorgona, Italy. The next day, she sank another Italian minesweeper, V 131, off Porto-Vecchio, Corsica. Sickle next attacked the Italian merchant ship Alfredo Oriani with seven torpedoes; two hit, but the ship did not sink and was towed back to port. The submarine also missed the German oil tanker Champagne on 22 July, then returned to Algiers on 28 July. Drummond was awarded the Distinguished Service Order at the end of this patrol.

She began a new patrol on 17 August, operating east of Corsica. After patrolling for eleven days, Sickle torpedoed and sank the German escort ship SG-10, which was escorting a convoy. Sickle then ended her patrol on 5 September.

On 22 September, Sickle left Algiers to patrol the Gulf of Genoa in the same area as in her previous patrol. In the evening of 28 September, the submarine landed two men near Sestri Levante, Italy; their mission was to gather intelligence as well as organize resistance movements and escapes of Allied prisoners of war to Switzerland. On 30 September and 3 October, Sickle attacked a small coastal trading vessel and a submarine chaser with three torpedoes each, missing with all six. The boat then returned to Algiers on 10 October.

=== Beirut ===
Between 25 October and 1 November, Sickle sailed from Algiers to Beirut, in Allied-occupied Lebanon, then shifted to Haifa. On 11 November, the boat departed Haifa to conduct a war patrol in the Aegean Sea. Sickle first sank with gunfire the Greek caïque Maria (MY 153) west of Amorgos, then torpedoed and sank the Italian merchant ship Giovanni Boccaccio off Monemvasia, two days later. She next sank with gunfire two sailing vessels near Milos; these were the Greek caïques Piraeus no. 795 and Samos no. 45. The boat returned to Beirut on 25 November.

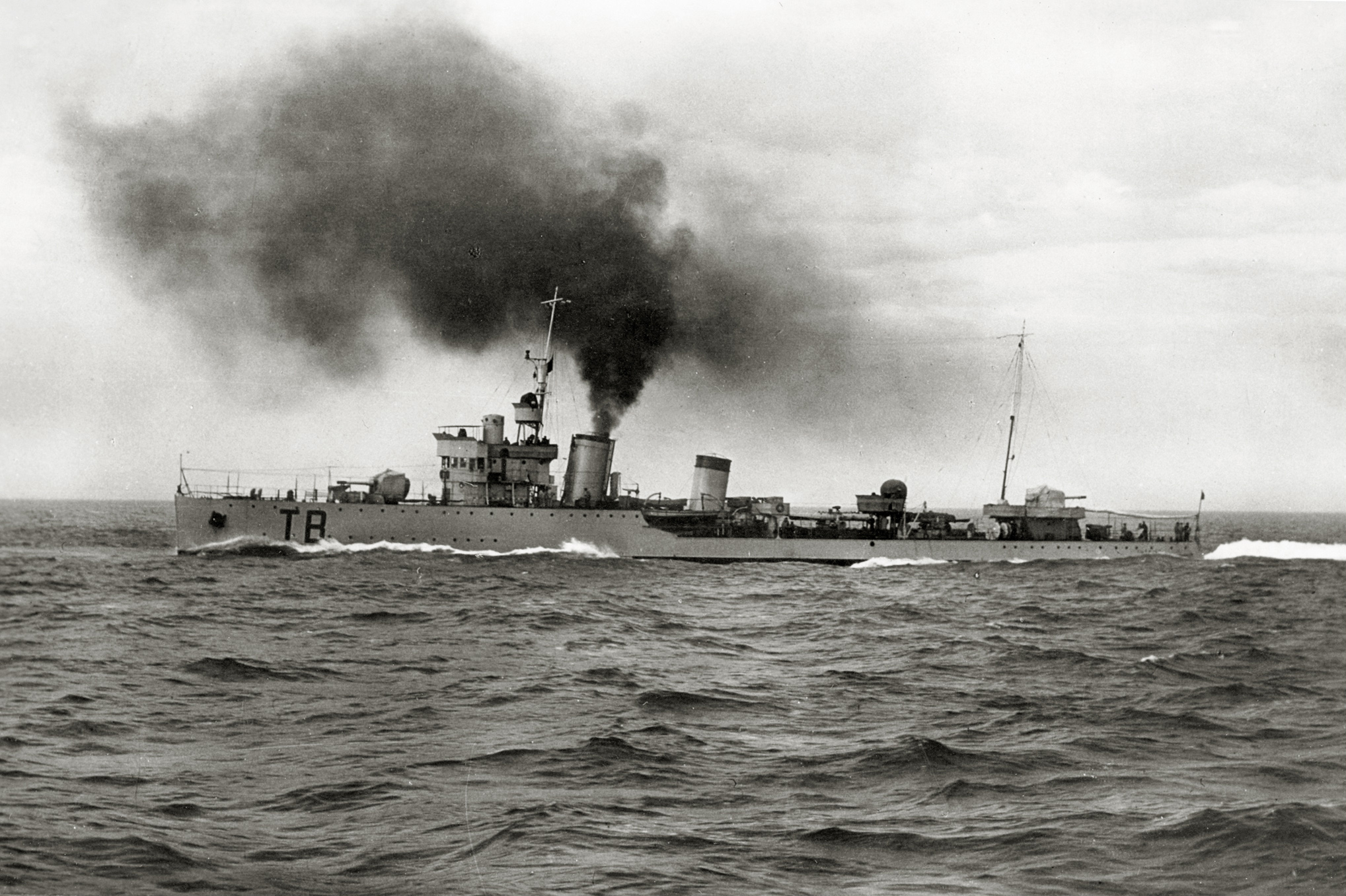
The German torpedo boat TA14, which damaged Sickle with depth charges on 21 December 1943

On 13 December, Sickle departed Beirut for another war patrol in the Aegean and attempted to attack a German convoy on 20 December. The next day, her periscope was sighted while looking into the harbour at Karlovasi, and she was attacked with depth charges by the German torpedo boats TA14 and TA15; Sickle sustained significant damage, especially to her electric motors. On 23 December, the submarine landed four Special Operations Executive Greek resistance men in Kalomos Bay, east of Euboea. Three days later, she sank with gunfire and by ramming two small unidentified Greek sailing vessels east of Mykonos Island; the crews of both ships were picked up by Sickle. The boat ended her patrol on 2 January 1944.

=== Malta ===
From 14 to 19 January, Sickle sailed to Malta, then to Gibraltar. There, she underwent repairs to her electric motors until 14 April, when she returned to Malta.

On 29 April, Sickle departed Malta to patrol in the Aegean Sea, where she sighted a German transport escorted by three destroyers, but lost sight of them in the fog on 7 May. The next day, the boat sank three Greek sailing vessels with demolition charges and by ramming in the Doro Channel. She initially attacked them on the surface with her deck gun, but it jammed after firing four rounds, so Sickle boarded the first ship, a caïque flying the Greek flag with the German occupation pennon. The ship was carrying a cargo of oranges and lemons, and sailors from Sickle brought a thousand of these to their submarine as an addition to their diet, then holed the caïque's hull, sinking it. The next two ships did not carry any salvageable cargo, and Sickle sank one with demolition charges and the other by ramming. On 11 May, Sickle surfaced and bombarded an enemy radar station with her three-inch deck gun; 17 rounds hit their target but the enemy returned fire four minutes later, wounding three men, including Sickle's captain and forcing her to submerge. Shortly after midnight on 13 May, the boat surfaced and sank the German sailing vessel Fratelli Corrao with gunfire. Two days later, she returned to Malta.

On 31 May, Sickle left Malta harbour for a patrol in the Aegean Sea; this was to be Sickle's last patrol. On 4 June, she engaged enemy ships on the surface at Mytilene; two sailors were wounded, one killed, and another washed overboard and captured. This man later became Sickle's only survivor. She was ordered on 5 June to patrol the eastern approach to the Doro channel. On 6 June, the submarine torpedoed and sank the German merchant ship Reaumur, and on 7 June a German lighter reported having been missed by torpedoes potentially launched by Sickle. On 8 June, a submarine that was possibly Sickle sank three caïques near Skopelos, and she missed the German transport Lola with torpedoes on 9 June. A submarine, again possibly Sickle, sank the caïque Efitichia with gunfire and bombarded a shipyard at Mytilene on 14 June 1944. The submarine was never seen again, and it is considered likely that she was sunk by mines on her way back to Malta in the Kythira Strait on or around 18 June.

== Summary of raiding history ==
During her service with the Royal Navy, Sickle sank 10 Axis ships for a total of 7,665 GRT as well as a German U-boat, three caïques and a sailing vessel of unknown tonnage.

| Date | Name of ship | Tonnage | Nationality | Fate and location |
|---|---|---|---|---|
| 15 May 1943 | UJ-2213 | 1,116 | Nazi Germany | Torpedoed and sank at 43°25′N 07°25′E |
| 21 May 1943 | German submarine U-303 | - | Nazi Germany | Torpedoed and sank at 43°00′N 05°59′E |
| 18 July 1943 | No. G.61 | 100 | Kingdom of Italy | Sunk with gunfire at 43°24′N 10°03′E |
| 18 July 1943 | No. R.164 | 39 | Kingdom of Italy | Sunk with gunfire at 43°24′N 10°03′E |
| 19 July 1943 | V 131 | 65 | Kingdom of Italy | Sunk with gunfire at 43°24′N 10°03′E |
| 28 August 1943 | SG-10 | 2,526 | Nazi Germany | Torpedoed and sunk at 42°24′N 09°41′E |
| 17 November 1943 | Maria (MY 153) | - | Kingdom of Greece | Sunk with gunfire west of Amorgos, Greece |
| 19 November 1943 | Giovanni Boccaccio | 3,160 | Nazi Germany | Torpedoed and sunk off Monemvasia, Greece |
| 25 November 1943 | Piraeus no. 795 | - | Kingdom of Greece | Sunk with gunfire at 37°22′N 24°15′E |
| 25 November 1943 | Samos no. 45 | - | Kingdom of Greece | Sunk with gunfire at 37°22′N 24°15′E |
| 26 December 1943 | unidentified | - | Kingdom of Greece | Sunk with gunfire and ramming east of Mykonos, Greece |
| 26 December 1943 | unidentified | - | Kingdom of Greece | Sunk with gunfire and ramming east of Mykonos, Greece |
| 8 May 1944 | unidentified | 50 | Kingdom of Greece | Sunk by a boarding party in the Doro Channel, Greece |
| 8 May 1944 | unidentified | 40 | Kingdom of Greece | Sunk by demolition charges in the Doro Channel, Greece |
| 8 May 1944 | unidentified | 20 | Kingdom of Greece | Sunk by ramming in the Doro Channel, Greece |
| 13 May 1944 | Fratelli Corrao | - | Nazi Germany | Sunk with gunfire at 35°55′N 25°02′E |
| 6 June 1944 | Reaumur | 549 | Nazi Germany | Torpedoed and sank at 38°00′N 24°35′E |
