= German submarine U-516 =

German World War II submarine

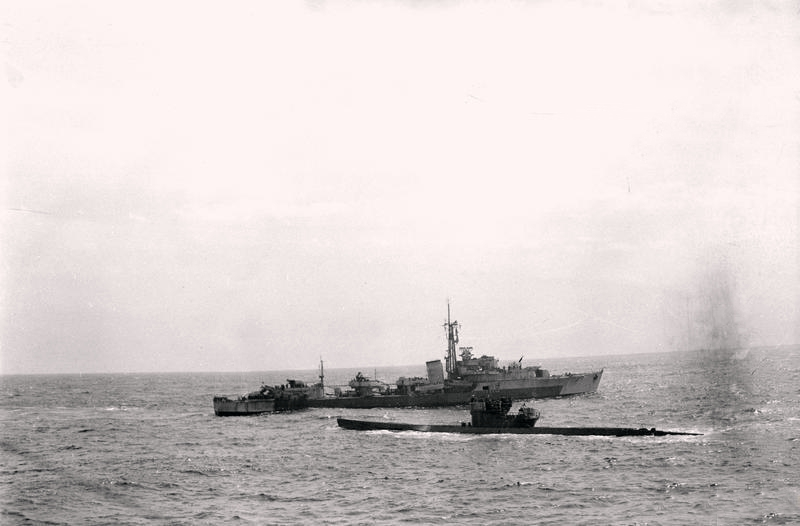
- U-516 surrenders to HMS Cavendish (R15) on 10 May 1945

History

Nazi Germany
- Name: U-516
- Ordered: 14 February 1940
- Builder: Deutsche Werft, Hamburg
- Yard number: 312
- Laid down: 12 May 1941
- Launched: 16 December 1941
- Commissioned: 21 February 1942
- Fate: Surrendered on 14 May 1945 at Loch Eriboll in Scotland; transferred to Lisahally in Northern Ireland. Sunk on 2 January 1946

General characteristics
- Class & type: Type IXC submarine
- Displacement: 1,120 t (1,100 long tons) surfaced; 1,232 t (1,213 long tons) submerged
- Length: 76.76 m (251 ft 10 in) o/a; 58.75 m (192 ft 9 in) pressure hull
- Beam: 6.76 m (22 ft 2 in) o/a; 4.40 m (14 ft 5 in) pressure hull
- Height: 9.60 m (31 ft 6 in)
- Draught: 4.70 m (15 ft 5 in)
- Installed power: 4,400 PS (3,200 kW; 4,300 bhp) (diesels); 1,000 PS (740 kW; 990 shp) (electric)
- Propulsion: 2 shafts; 2 × diesel engines; 2 × electric motors
- Speed: 18.3 knots (33.9 km/h; 21.1 mph) surfaced; 7.3 knots (13.5 km/h; 8.4 mph) submerged
- Range: 13,450 nmi (24,910 km; 15,480 mi) at 10 knots (19 km/h; 12 mph) surfaced; 64 nmi (119 km; 74 mi) at 4 knots (7.4 km/h; 4.6 mph) submerged
- Test depth: 230 m (750 ft)
- Complement: 4 officers, 44 enlisted
- Armament: 6 × torpedo tubes (4 bow, 2 stern); 22 × 53.3 cm (21 in) torpedoes; 1 × 10.5 cm (4.1 in) SK C/32 deck gun (180 rounds); 1 × 3.7 cm (1.5 in) SK C/30 AA gun; 1 × twin 2 cm FlaK 30 AA guns

Service record
- Part of: 4th U-boat Flotilla; 10 March 1942 – 31 August 1942; 10th U-boat Flotilla; 1 – 30 September 1944; 33rd U-boat Flotilla; 1 October 1944 – 8 May 1945
- Identification codes: M 41 960
- Commanders: K.Kapt. Gehard Wiebe; 10 March 1942 – 23 June 1943; K.Kapt. Hans Pauckstadt; 11 – 27 May 1942; Kptlt. Herbert Kuppisch; 24 – 30 June 1943; Kptlt. Hans-Rutger Tillessen; 1 July – December 1944; Oblt.z.S. Friedrich Petran; December 1944 – 14 May 1945
- Operations: 6 patrols: 1st patrol: a. 12 – 13 August 1942; b. 15 August – 14 November 1942; 2nd patrol: 23 December 1942 – 4 May 1943; 3rd patrol: a. 8 July – 23 August 1943; b. 30 September – 1 October 1943; 4th patrol: 4 October 1943 – 26 February 1944; 5th patrol: a. 7 May – 4 October 1944; b. 24 – 27 March 1945; c. 1 – 3 April 1945; 6th patrol: 5 April – 14 May 1945
- Victories: 16 merchant ships sunk (89,385 GRT); 1 merchant ship damaged (9,687 GRT)

German submarine U-516 was a Type IXC U-boat of Nazi Germany's Kriegsmarine during World War II.

She was laid down at the Deutsche Werft (yard) in Hamburg as yard number 312 on 12 May 1941, launched on 16 December 1941 and commissioned on 21 February 1942 with Korvettenkapitän Gerhard Wiebe in command.

U-516 began her service career with training as part of the 4th U-boat Flotilla from 10 March 1942. She was reassigned to the 10th flotilla for operations on 1 September 1942, then the 33rd flotilla on 1 October 1944.

She carried out six patrols, sank 16 ships and damaged one more. She surrendered on 14 May 1945 at Loch Eriboll in Scotland and was transferred to Lisahally in Northern Ireland for Operation Deadlight. She was sunk on 2 January 1946.

== Design ==
German Type IXC submarines were slightly larger than the original Type IXBs. U-516 had a displacement of 1,120 tonnes (1,100 long tons) when at the surface and 1,232 tonnes (1,213 long tons) while submerged. The U-boat had a total length of 76.76 m (251 ft 10 in), a pressure hull length of 58.75 m (192 ft 9 in), a beam of 6.76 m (22 ft 2 in), a height of 9.60 m (31 ft 6 in), and a draught of 4.70 m (15 ft 5 in). The submarine was powered by two MAN M 9 V 40/46 supercharged four-stroke, nine-cylinder diesel engines producing a total of 4,400 metric horsepower (3,240 kW; 4,340 shp) for use while surfaced, two Siemens-Schuckert 2 GU 345/34 double-acting electric motors producing a total of 1,000 shaft horsepower (1,010 PS; 750 kW) for use while submerged. She had two shafts and two 1.92 m (6 ft) propellers. The boat was capable of operating at depths of up to 230 metres (750 ft).

The submarine had a maximum surface speed of 18.3 knots (33.9 km/h; 21.1 mph) and a maximum submerged speed of 7.3 knots (13.5 km/h; 8.4 mph). When submerged, the boat could operate for 63 nautical miles (117 km; 72 mi) at 4 knots (7.4 km/h; 4.6 mph); when surfaced, she could travel 13,450 nautical miles (24,910 km; 15,480 mi) at 10 knots (19 km/h; 12 mph). U-516 was fitted with six 53.3 cm (21 in) torpedo tubes (four fitted at the bow and two at the stern), 22 torpedoes, one 10.5 cm (4.13 in) SK C/32 naval gun, 180 rounds, and a 3.7 cm (1.5 in) SK C/30 as well as a 2 cm (0.79 in) C/30 anti-aircraft gun. The boat had a complement of forty-eight.

== Service history ==
=== First patrol ===
U-516'es first patrol was preceded by a short trip from Kiel in Germany to Kristiansand in Norway. The patrol itself began with the boat's departure from Kristiansand on 15 August 1942. She passed through the 'gap' separating Iceland and the Faroe Islands before heading out into the Atlantic Ocean.

She damaged the Port Jackson with 14 rounds from her deck gun 480 nautical miles (890 km; 550 mi) west of Cape Clear, (at the southern tip of Ireland), on the 27th, after a spread of four torpedoes had missed. A small fire was started on the ship, but her accurate return fire discouraged the U-boat which broke off the attack. Port Jackson escaped at top speed into haze.

The boat moved to the waters off northern South America where her success rate shot-up, although one target required seven torpedoes to sink her.

She entered Lorient, on the French Atlantic coast, on 14 November.

=== Second and third patrols ===
For her second foray, U-516 headed toward South Africa. She sank three ships in the vicinity of East London and a fourth off the coast of southern Namibia.

Her third sortie was also in a southerly direction; its furthest point was reached between South America and the Cape Verde Islands.

=== Fourth patrol ===
Patrol number four took the boat to the Caribbean Sea. One of her victims was the Colombian sailing ship Ruby, which was sunk with the deck gun on 18 November 1943 with the loss of four of her 11 crew, the seven survivors, all of them injured, were picked up by the Honduran steam merchant ship Orotava the next day and landed at Cristobal on 20 November.

The American tanker Elizabeth Kellogg was torpedoed and abandoned on the 23rd; she ran around the survivors, still underway because the engines could not be secured, her after magazine exploded and she burned for 12 hours before sinking. Two gunners and eight crew were lost. The survivors were rescued by USS SC-1017 (United States Navy) and USAT Y-10 (United States Army).

The U-boat was damaged by an unidentified aircraft on 19 December 1943.

=== Fifth patrol ===
The boat's fifth patrol saw her sink the Esso Harrisburg 200 nautical miles (370 km; 230 mi) northwest of Aruba in the Caribbean. She then made her way to Flensburg via the Denmark Strait that separates Greenland and Iceland. She docked at the German harbour on 4 October 1944.

=== Sixth patrol and fate ===
Having moved from Kiel to Horten Naval Base, (south of Oslo) and then Kristiansand, she left the Norwegian port on 5 April 1945. She surrendered at Loch Eriboll on 14 May and was then transferred to Lisahally in Northern Ireland for Operation Deadlight. She was sunk on 2 January 1946 at 56°06′N 09°00′W.

== Summary of raiding history ==
Date	Ship Name	Nationality	Tonnage (GRT)	Fate
27 August 1942	Port Jackson	United Kingdom	9,687	Damaged
31 August 1942	Jack Carnes	United States	10,907	Sunk
19 September 1942	Wichita	United States	6,174	Sunk
28 September 1942	Antonico	Brazil	1,223	Sunk
30 September 1942	Alipore	United Kingdom	5,273	Sunk
24 October 1942	Holmpark	United Kingdom	5,780	Sunk
11 February 1943	Helmspey	United Kingdom	4,764	Sunk
17 February 1943	Deer Lodge	United States	6,187	Sunk
27 February 1943	Colombia	Netherlands	10,782	Sunk
20 March 1943	Nortun	Panama	3,663	Sunk
13 November 1943	Pompoon	Panama	1,082	Sunk
18 November 1943	Ruby	Colombia	39	Sunk
23 November 1943	Elizabeth Kellog	United States	5,189	Sunk
24 November 1943	Melville E. Stone	United States	7,176	Sunk
8 December 1943	Colombia	Panama	1,064	Sunk
16 December 1943	McDowell	United States	10,195	Sunk
7 July 1944	Esso Harrisburg	United States	9,887	Sunk

== Bibliography ==
- Busch, Rainer; Röll, Hans-Joachim (1999). German U-boat commanders of World War II : a biographical dictionary. Translated by Brooks, Geoffrey. London, Annapolis, Md: Greenhill Books, Naval Institute Press. ISBN 1-55750-186-6.
- Busch, Rainer; Röll, Hans-Joachim (1999). Deutsche U-Boot-Verluste von September 1939 bis Mai 1945 [German U-boat losses from September 1939 to May 1945]. Der U-Boot-Krieg (in German). Vol. IV. Hamburg, Berlin, Bonn: Mittler. ISBN 3-8132-0514-2.
- Gröner, Erich (1985). Die deutschen Kriegsschiffe 1815–1945 / 3, U-Boote, Hilfskreuzer, Minenschiffe, Netzleger, Sperrbrecher (in German). Koblenz: Bernard & Graefe. ISBN 3-7637-4802-4. OCLC 310610321.
- Gröner, Erich; Jung, Dieter; Maass, Martin (1991). U-boats and Mine Warfare Vessels. German Warships 1815–1945. Vol. 2. Translated by Thomas, Keith; Magowan, Rachel. London: Conway Maritime Press. ISBN 0-85177-593-4.
