= HNLMS Colombia =

Royal Netherlands Navy Auxiliary

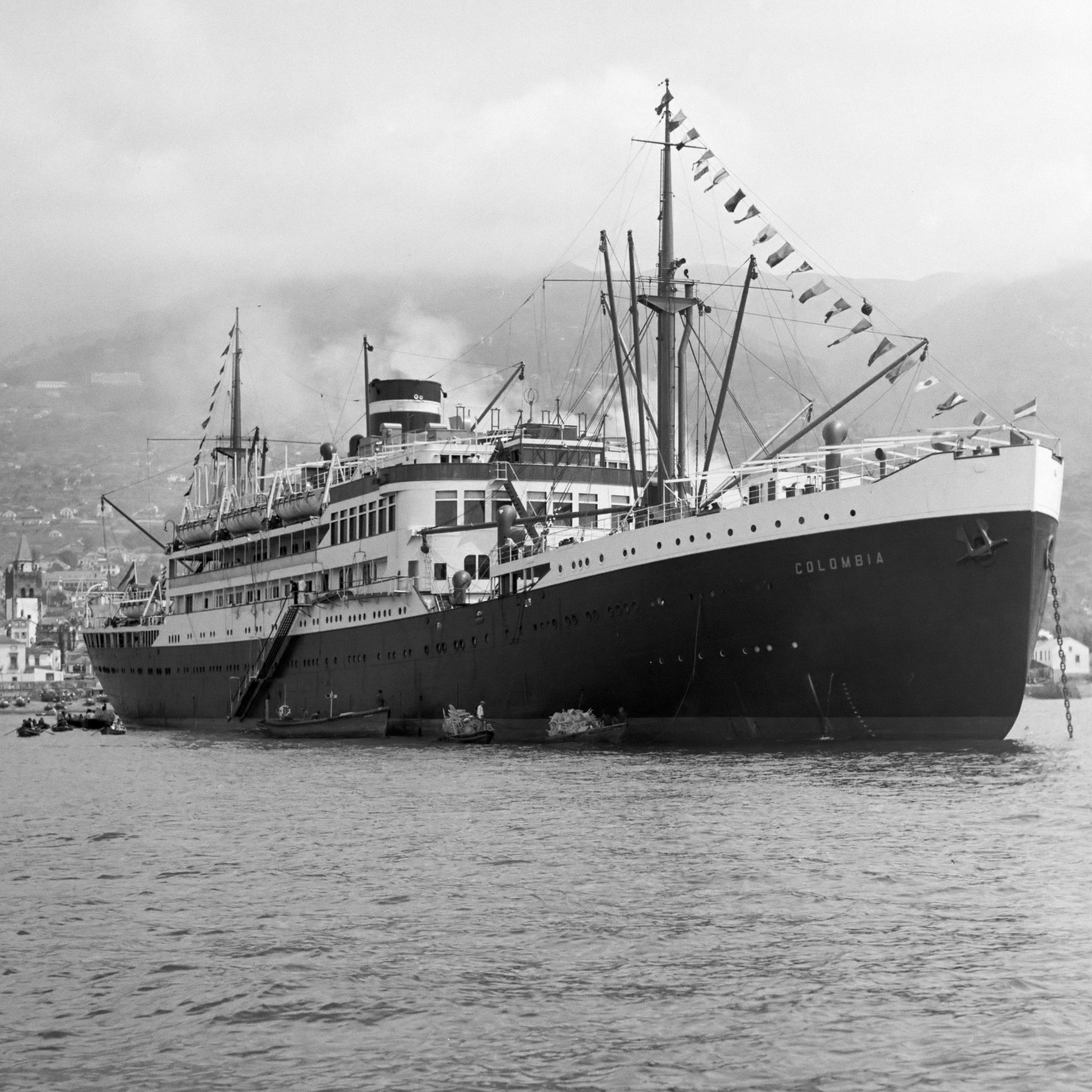
- MS Colombia as a passenger liner in 1934

History

Netherlands
- Name: Colombia
- Launched: 1930
- Commissioned: 20 May 1941
- Out of service: 27 February 1943
- Fate: Torpedoed off the coast of Simonstad in 1943.

General characteristics
- Type: Auxiliary, submarine tender
- Displacement: 14,600 t (14,400 long tons) standard
- Length: 139.30 m (457 ft 0 in)
- Beam: 18.7 m (61 ft 4 in)
- Draught: 8.10 m (26 ft 7 in)
- Installed power: 8,000 hp (6,000 kW)
- Propulsion: 2 × Werkspoor four stroke expansion engines powering 2 shafts
- Speed: 15.5 knots (28.7 km/h; 17.8 mph)
- Complement: 273
- Armament: 4 × single 76 mm (3.0 in) cannon; 8 × single 20 mm (0.79 in) Oerlikon guns; 6 × single 12.7 mm (0.50 in) machine guns; 4 × single 7.9 mm (0.31 in) machine guns

HNLMS Colombia was originally an ocean liner, registered as MS Colombia. She was the flagship of the Koninklijke Nederlandse Stoomboot-Maatschappij. She would be commandeered and militarized by the Royal Netherlands Navy on 8 November 1940.

== Service history ==
Serving as a troopship during the first year of her career with the Royal Netherlands Navy, Colombia was converted at Dundee into a submarine tender with the conversion work lasting from 1 May to 18 September 1941. She served in her role as submarine tender until she was torpedoed by the German submarine U-516, off the coast of Simonstown, Union of South Africa (33°36′S 27°29′E), on 27 February 1943. Eight of the 326 crew died during her sinking, with remaining survivors rescued by HMS Genista and a Royal Air Force launch.
