= USS Runner (SS-275) =

Submarine of the United States

Coordinates: 48°02′N 153°17′E

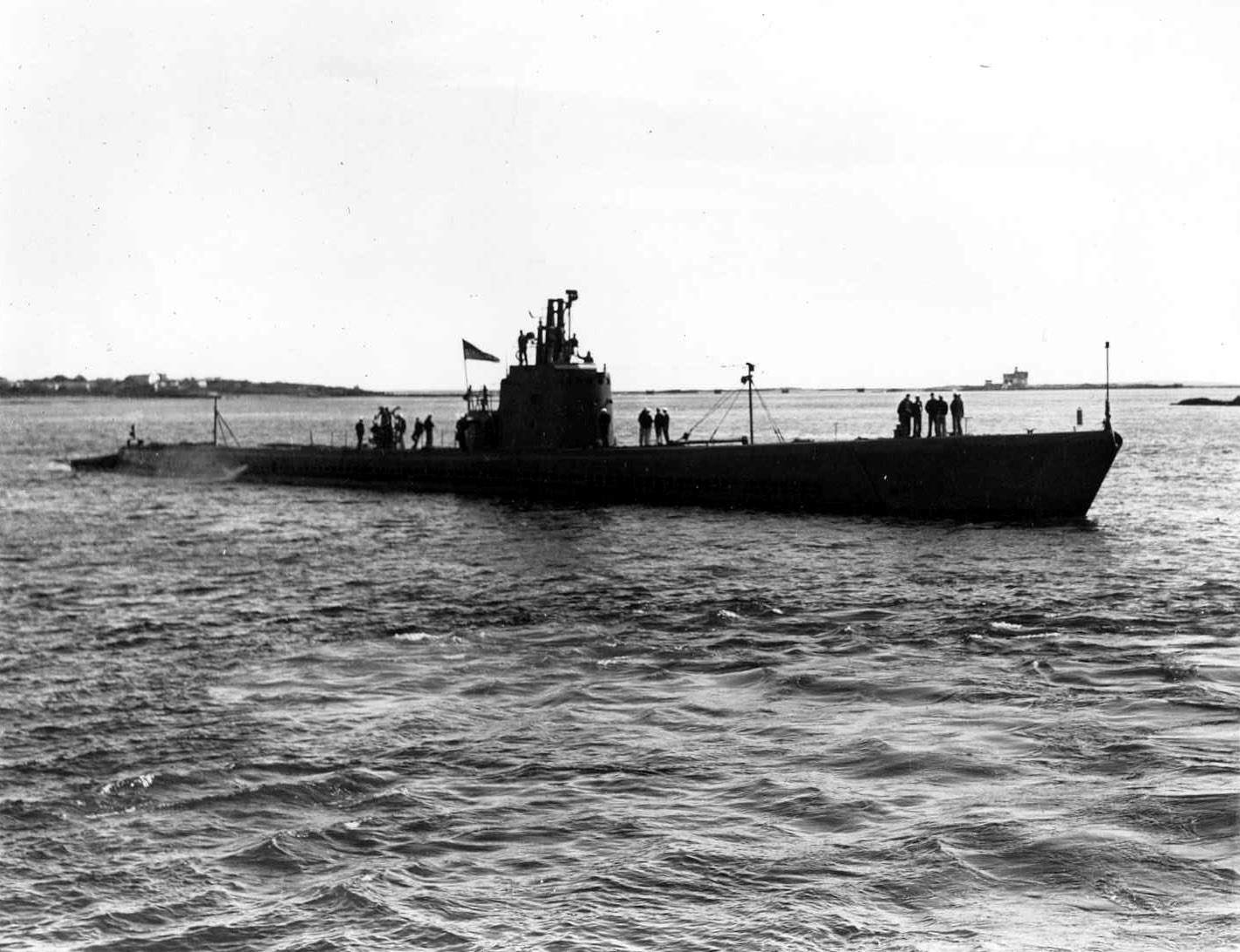
- USS Runner (SS-275), probably photographed during her shakedown period while off the Portsmouth Navy Yard between 30 May & October 1942.

History

United States
- Name: Runner
- Namesake: Runner
- Builder: Portsmouth Naval Shipyard, Kittery, Maine
- Laid down: 8 December 1941
- Launched: 30 May 1942
- Sponsored by: Mrs. Elise Curry Newton
- Commissioned: 30 July 1942
- Fate: Missing June 1943
- Stricken: 30 October 1943

General characteristics
- Class & type: Gato-class diesel-electric submarine
- Displacement: 1,525 tons (1,549 t) surfaced; 2,424 tons (2,460 t) submerged
- Length: 311 ft 9 in (95.02 m)
- Beam: 27 ft 3 in (8.31 m)
- Draft: 17 ft 0 in (5.18 m) maximum
- Propulsion: 4 × General Motors Model 16-248 V16 Diesel engines driving electric generators; 2 × 126-cell Sargo batteries; 4 × high-speed General Electric electric motors with reduction gears; two propellers; 5,400 shp (4.0 MW) surfaced; 2,740 shp (2.0 MW) submerged
- Speed: 21 knots (39 km/h) surfaced; 9 knots (17 km/h) submerged
- Range: 11,000 nm (20,000 km) surfaced at 10 knots (19 km/h)
- Endurance: 48 hours at 2 knots (4 km/h) submerged; 75 days on patrol
- Test depth: 300 ft (90 m)
- Complement: 6 officers, 54 enlisted
- Armament: 10 × 21-inch (533 mm) torpedo tubes; 6 forward, 4 aft; 24 torpedoes; 1 × 3-inch (76 mm) / 50 caliber deck gun; Bofors 40 mm and Oerlikon 20 mm cannon

USS Runner (SS-275) was a Gato-class submarine, the first ship of the United States Navy to be named for the runner, an amberfish inhabiting subtropical waters, so called for its rapid leaps from the water.

== Construction and commissioning ==
Runner's keel was laid down on 8 December 1941 by the Portsmouth Navy Yard at Kittery, Maine. She was launched on 30 May 1942, sponsored by Mrs. Elise Curry Newton, wife of Admiral John H. Newton, then Commander, Cruisers, Scouting Force, and commissioned on 30 July 1942.

== Service history ==
Following shakedown from New London, Connecticut, Runner departed the United States East Coast in late 1942, transited the Panama Canal, and arrived at Pearl Harbor, Hawaii on 10 January 1943. She set out on her first war patrol on 18 January 1943, bound for a patrol area in the Pacific Ocean between Midway Atoll in the Northwestern Hawaiian Islands and the Palau Islands. She claimed five Japanese cargo ships torpedoed during the patrol, but none was confirmed as being sunk. On 19 February 1943, she suffered damage from a near-miss by a bomb dropped from a Japanese patrol bomber while she was making the last attack of her patrol, on a cargo ship off Peleliu. The concussion knocked out her sound gear and the power supply for both periscope hoists. Runner made her escape by a deep dive, her crew made emergency repairs, and she returned to Pearl Harbor on 7 March 1943 for overhaul. For this patrol, Fenno received his third award of the Navy Cross.

Runner departed Pearl Harbor on 1 April 1943 to begin her second patrol, 1 April to 6 May, Her primary mission was to lay a minefield off Pedro Blanco Rock. Successful in this mission, Runner proceeded to Hainan Strait off China. She torpedoed one cargo ship, and her crew heard the sound of a ship breaking up over her sound gear, but could not confirm a kill. It later was determined that in fact Runner had torpedoed and damaged the Imperial Japanese Army hospital ship Buenos Aires Maru on 24 April 1943. She concluded the patrol with her arrival at Midway Atoll on 6 May 1943.

On 27 May 1943 Runner departed Midway for her third war patrol, assigned a patrol area in the Kuril Islands chain and the waters off northern Japan. She was never heard from again.

Runner was declared overdue and presumed lost in July 1943. She was stricken from the Naval Vessel Register on 30 October 1943.

Captured Japanese records examined after World War II indicated that she sank the cargo ship Seinan Maru on 11 June 1943 in Tsugaru Strait off Hokkaidō and on 22 June 1943 was attacked and apparently damaged by Imperial Japanese Navy forces. She also was credited postwar with sinking the passenger-cargo ship Shinryu Maru on 26 June 1943 off the Kuril Islands, although the explosion that sank Shinryu Maru also has been dated as occurring on 29 June 1943 and attributed to unknown causes.

== Awards ==
Runner was awarded one battle star for World War II service.
