= HS Buenos Aires Maru =

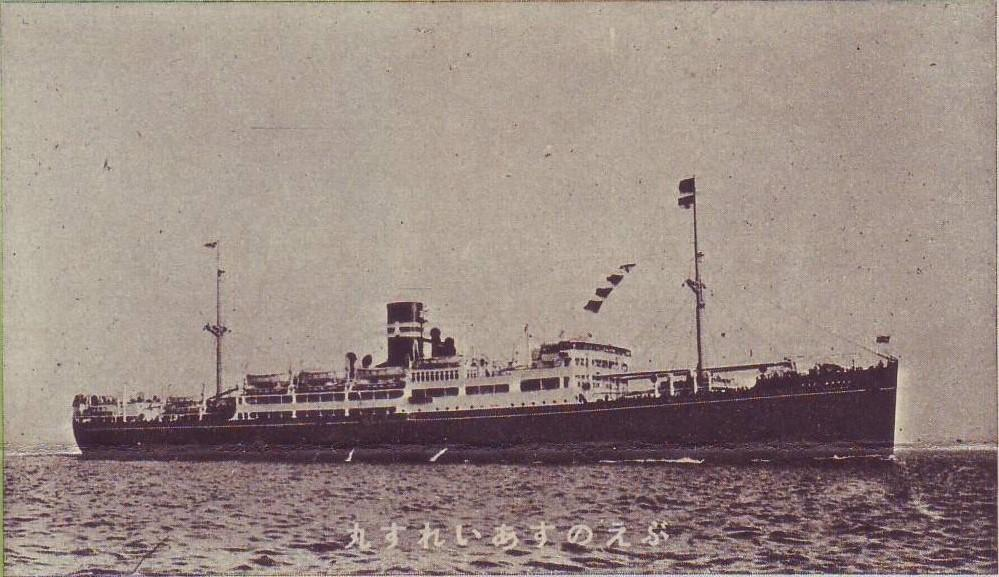
- SS Buenos Aires Maru in 1937

History
- Name: Buenos Aires Maru
- Owner: Mitsui O.S.K. Lines
- Port of registry: Osaka, Japan
- Builder: Mitsubishi Shipbuilding
- Yard number: 456
- Laid down: 15 October 1928
- Launched: 11 May 1929
- Completed: 31 October 1929
- Acquired: 31 October 1929
- Maiden voyage: 30 November 1929
- In service: 30 November 1929
- Out of service: 27 November 1943
- Identification: Official number: 35178; Call sign: JLAC
- Fate: Bombed and sunk by American warplanes on 27 November 1943

General characteristics
- Type: Passenger ship
- Tonnage: 9,626 GRT
- Length: 140.60 metres (461 ft 3 in)
- Beam: 18.90 metres (62 ft 0 in)
- Depth: 12.00 metres (39 ft 4 in)
- Installed power: Two 6 cyl. Mitsubishi Sulzer 2 SCSA diesel engines
- Propulsion: Two screws
- Sail plan: (Pre war) Kobe - Santos
- Speed: 16.6 knots
- Capacity: Accommodation for 2 First class, 60 Second class & 1,076 Third Class passengers
- Notes: Two masts and a single funnel

SS Buenos Aires Maru was a Japanese Passenger ship that served as a troopship and hospital ship during World War II before she was sunk by American warplanes on 27 November 1943 with the loss of 158 lives.

== Construction ==
Buenos Aires Maru was built at the Mitsubishi Shipbuilding shipyard in Nagasaki, Japan and launched on 11 May 1929 before being completed on 31 October 1929. The ship was 140.60 metres (461 ft 3 in) long, had a beam of 18.90 metres (62 ft 0 in) and a depth of 12.00 metres (39 ft 4 in). She was assessed at 9,626 GRT and had two 6 cyl. Mitsubishi Sulzer 2 SCSA diesel engines driving two screw propellers. The ship could reach a speed of 16.6 knots and had accommodation for 2 First class, 60 Second class & 1,076 Third Class passengers. She had one sistership: Rio de Janeiro Maru.

== Early career ==
Buenos Aires Maru sailed on her maiden voyage from Kobe, Japan to Santos, Brazil on 30 November 1929 and arrived at her destination without incident on 30 December 1929. Buenos Aires Maru left on her last peacetime voyage from Kobe on 26 June 1941 and had to sail around Cape Horn on her return voyage to Japan from Santos as the United States had closed the Panama Canal for Japanese shipping following Japan's occupation of French Indochina.

== War service & sinking ==
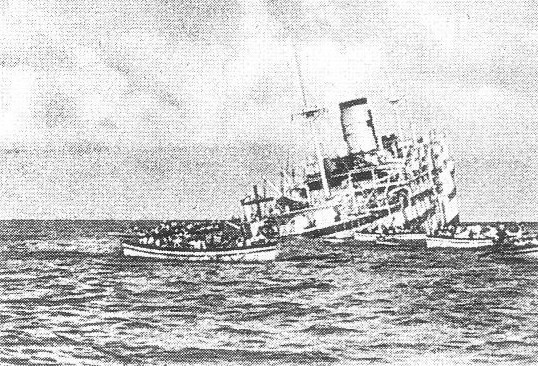
Buenos Aires Maru sinking on 27 November 1943.

Buenos Aires Maru was requisitioned by the Imperial Japanese Army for service as a troopship in November 1941 and transported troops throughout the Pacific until she was converted into a Hospital ship in November 1942. Buenos Aires Maru was still in service as a hospital ship when she was mistakenly torpedoed by the American submarine USS Runner in the South China Sea, south off Hong Kong on 24 April 1943. Although she was damaged and seven men aboard her were wounded in the attack, Buenos Aires Maru stayed afloat and made it to Kowloon on 26 April to undergo repairs. Buenos Aires Maru returned to service on 6 May 1943.

Buenos Aires Maru departed Rabaul, Papua New Guinea for Palau as part of an unidentified convoy while carrying 63 nurses, 1,129 wounded IJA soldiers and an unknown number of Japanese servicemen on 26 November 1943. The following day at 8.30 am, as the ship was sailing in the Steffen Strait between New Hanover Island and New Ireland, off St. Matthias Island, she was spotted by a Consolidated B-24 Liberator which proceeded to bomb the ship. Buenos Aires Maru was severely damaged in the attack and took on a port list as her engine room flooded. The survivors of the attack were evacuated from the ship by use of her 16 lifeboats and two motor launches before Buenos Aires Maru sank at 8.50 am. According to a Japanese foreign office dispatch, the survivors in the lifeboats were waving red sheets forming a red cross as the American plane came in at a low altitude and proceeded to machine gun the lifeboats before flying off, although it was more likely that the aircraft mistakenly attacked the ship just as USS Runner had done seven months prior. The remaining survivors were rescued on 3 December 1943 by Imperial Japanese Navy submarine chasers while a total of 158 men and nurses had perished in the sinking or afterwards in the lifeboats while awaiting rescue.
