= USS Capelin =

Submarine of the United States

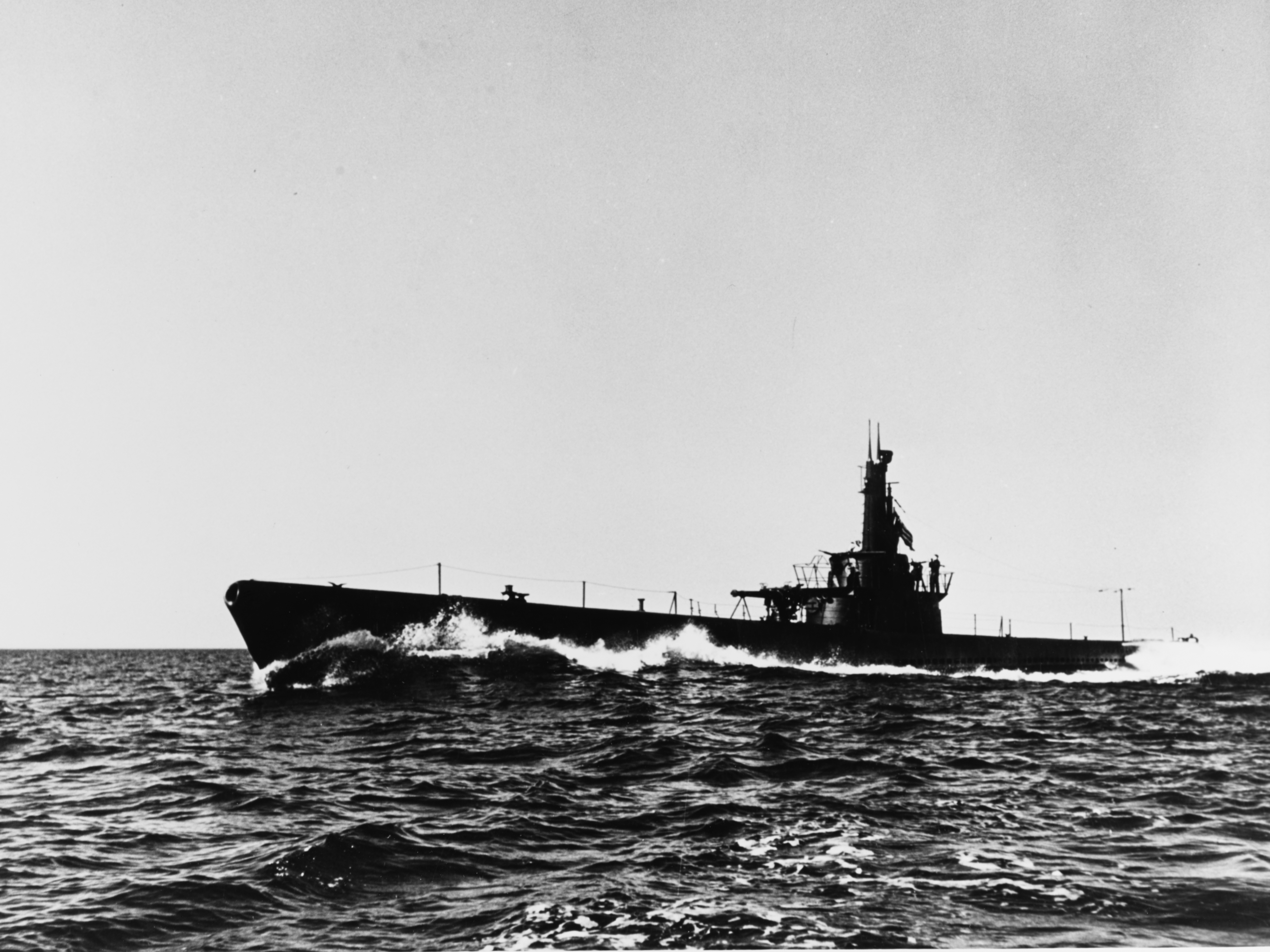

History

United States
- Name: Capelin
- Builder: Portsmouth Naval Shipyard, Kittery, Maine
- Laid down: 14 September 1942
- Launched: 20 January 1943
- Commissioned: 4 June 1943
- Fate: Missing north of Sulawesi after 2 December 1943

General characteristics
- Class & type: Balao-class diesel-electric submarine
- Displacement: 1,526 tons (1550 t) surfaced; 2,414 tons (2453 t) submerged
- Length: 311 ft 9 in (95.02 m)
- Beam: 27 ft 3 in (8.31 m)
- Draft: 16 ft 10 in (5.13 m) maximum
- Propulsion: 4 × General Motors Model 16-248 V16 Diesel engines driving electric generators; 2 × 126-cell Sargo batteries; 4 × high-speed General Electric electric motors with reduction gears; two propellers; 5,400 shp (4.0 MW) surfaced; 2,740 shp (2.0 MW) submerged
- Speed: 20.25 knots (37 km/h) surfaced; 8.75 knots (16 km/h) submerged
- Range: 11,000 nm (20,000 km) surfaced at 10 knots (19 km/h)
- Endurance: 48 hours at 2 knots (4 km/h) submerged; 75 days on patrol
- Test depth: 400 ft (120 m)
- Complement: 10 officers, 70–71 enlisted
- Armament: 10 × 21-inch (533 mm) torpedo tubes; 6 forward, 4 aft; 24 torpedoes; 1 × 4-inch (102 mm) / 50 caliber deck gun; Bofors 40 mm and Oerlikon 20 mm cannon

USS Capelin (SS-289), a Balao-class submarine, was the only ship of the United States Navy to be named for the capelin, a small fish of the smelt family. She is credited with having sunk 3,127 gross register tons of shipping on her single war patrol.

== Construction and commissioning ==
Capelin′s keel was laid down by Portsmouth Naval Shipyard at Kittery, Maine. She was launched on 20 January 1943, sponsored by Mrs. I. C. Bogart, and commissioned on 4 June 1943.

== Service history ==
View of Capelin's bow and conning tower

Capelin sailed from New London, Connecticut, on 3 September 1943, bound for Brisbane, Australia, and duty with Submarine Force, Southwest Pacific. Her first war patrol, conducted in the Molucca Sea, Flores Sea, and Banda Sea between 30 October and 15 November, found her sinking a 3127-ton Japanese cargo ship on 11 November off Ambon Island.

Capelin returned to Darwin, Australia, with a defective conning tower hatch mechanism, excessively noisy bow planes, and a defective radar tube. These flaws were corrected, and Capelin put out on her second war patrol 17 November 1943, in the Molucca Sea and Celebes Sea, and she was to pay particular attention to Kaoe Bay, Morotai Strait, Davao Gulf, and trade routes in the vicinity of Siaoe Island, Sangi Island, Talaud Islands and Sarangani Island. She was to leave her area at dark 6 December.

== Disappearance and aftermath ==
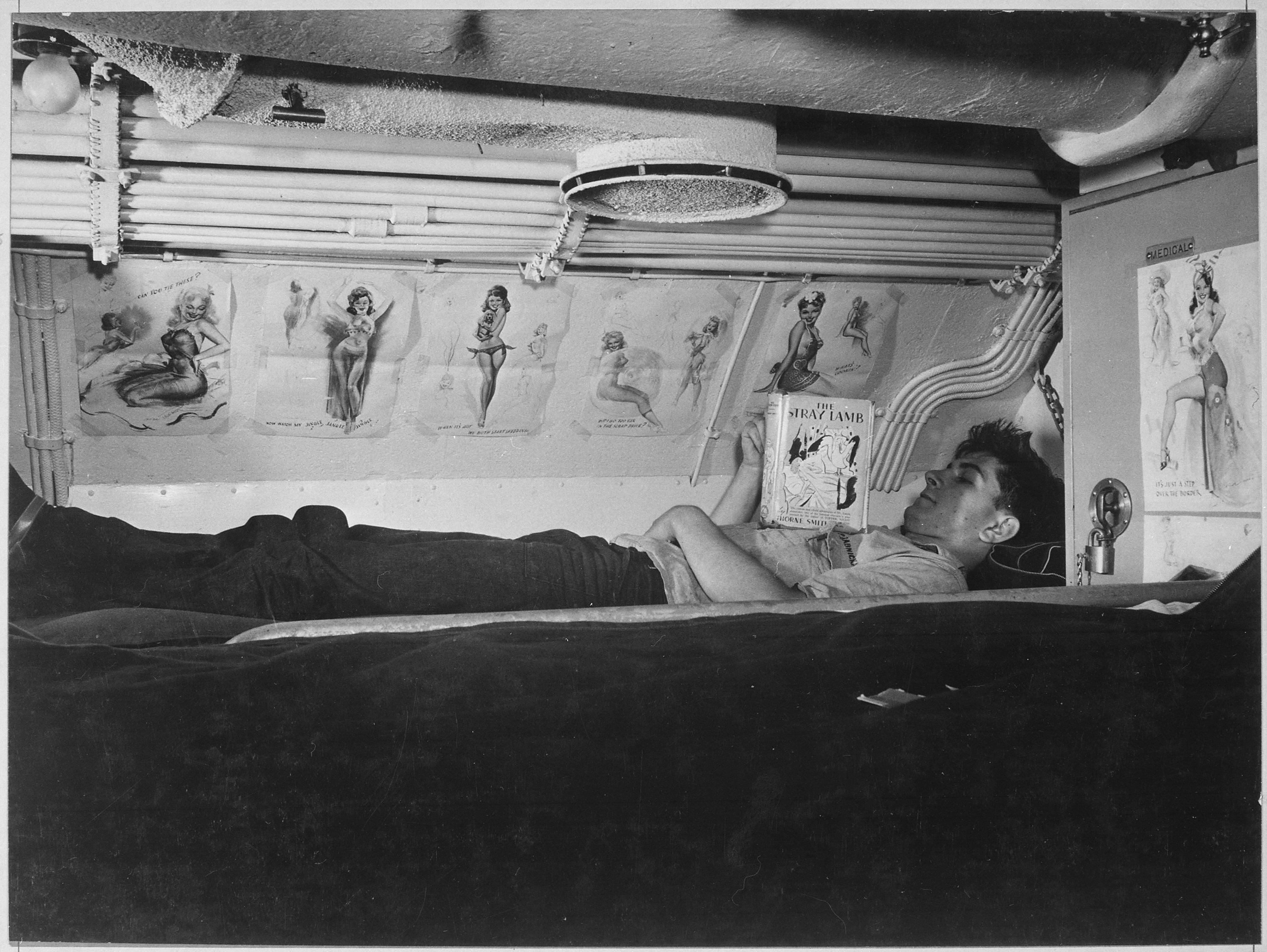
Sailor Peter Grabnickas reading The Stray Lamb (1929) by Thorne Smith in his pinup-decorated bunk aboard USS Capelin (SS-289) at Naval Submarine Base New London in Groton, Connecticut.

The submarine Bonefish (SS-223) reported sighting an American submarine on 2 December 1943 in the area assigned to Capelin at that time. The unidentified submarine quickly dived, probably after sighting Bonefish. Bonefish sent a message via sonar giving Commander Marshall's nickname, "Steam". The other submarine returned an acknowledgement. Following this, Capelin was never heard from again. The U.S. Navy broke radio silence on 9 December 1943 in an attempt to contact Capelin, but without success.

Japanese records studied after the war listed an attack by the minelayer Wakataka on a supposed United States submarine on 23 November 1943 off Kaoe Bay, Halmahera, Indonesia, with the Japanese ship noting the attack produced oily black water columns that contained wood and cork splinters and that later a raft was found. This is the only reported attack in the appropriate area at that time, and it occurred nine days before Bonefish's apparent contact with Capelin. Also, Japanese minefields are now known to have been placed in various positions along the north coast of Celebes (now known as Sulawesi) in Capelin's patrol area, and she may have been lost to a naval mine. Gone without a trace with the loss of her entire crew, Capelin remains on the list of ships lost without a known cause.

== Honors and awards ==
- Asiatic-Pacific Campaign Medal with one battle star
- World War II Victory Medal

== See also ==
- List of U.S. Navy losses in World War II
- List of people who disappeared mysteriously at sea
