= Davidovka =

Davidovka can mean:

- any of a large number of possible places called "Davidovka" in Ukraine, Belarus, Kazakhstan, Russia, or the former Soviet Union
- Davydawka (Belarusian: Давыдаўка, romanized: Davydaŭka, Russian: Давыдовка, romanized: Davidovka), a village which now is in Svyetlahorsk District, Gomel Region, Belarus
- Davidovka, Kazakhstan
- Davidovka concentration camp, a Hungarian-controlled World War II labor camp
