= January 1943 =

Month of 1943

<<	January 1943					>>
Su	Mo	Tu	We	Th	Fr	Sa
					1	2
3	4	5	6	7	8	9
10	11	12	13	14	15	16
17	18	19	20	21	22	23
24	25	26	27	28	29	30
31

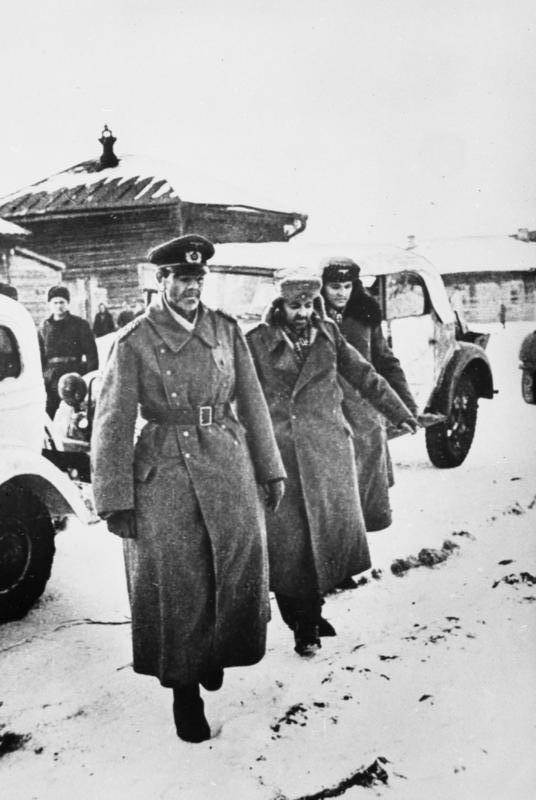
January 31, 1943: Germany's Field Marshal Paulus surrenders to Soviets at Stalingrad.

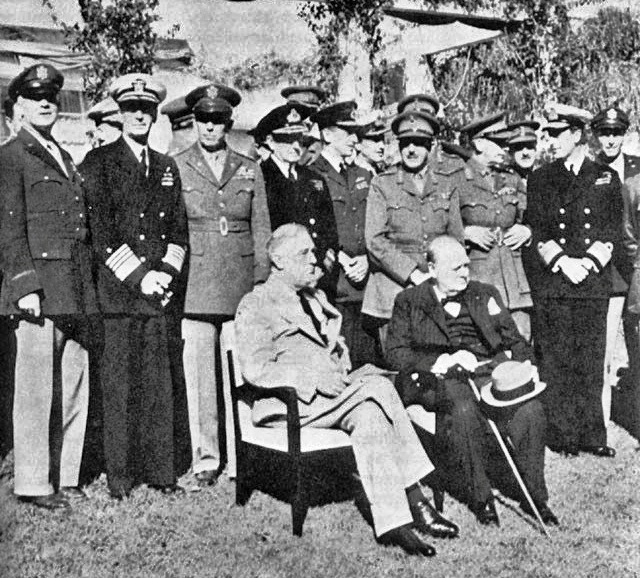
January 24, 1943: At Casablanca, Roosevelt and Churchill declare they will accept nothing less than the unconditional surrender of the Axis powers.

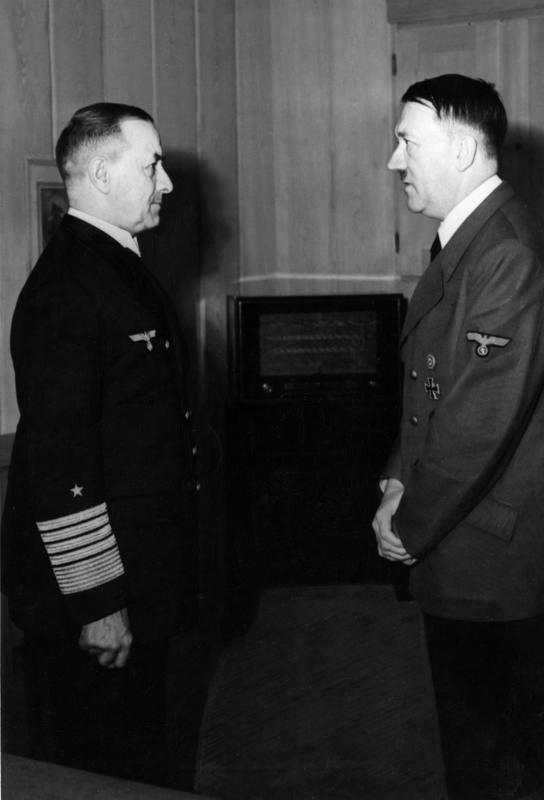
January 30, 1943: Admiral Erich Raeder resigns as Commander-in-Chief of the Kriegsmarine due to growing dissatisfaction with Adolf Hitler following Germany's defeat in the Battle of the Barents Sea, and is succeeded by Karl Dönitz.

The following events occurred in January 1943:

== January 1, 1943 (Friday) ==
- The Soviet Union announced that 22 German divisions in Stalingrad had been encircled by the Red Army, and that 175,000 of the enemy had been killed and 137,650 captured.
- The Battle of Gjorm began between Albanian Resistance fighters and Italian forces.
- The Georgia Bulldogs defeated the UCLA Bruins, 9–0, in the Rose Bowl before a crowd of 93,000 as the postseason college football game returned to Pasadena, California. Georgia had been ranked #2 in the final Associated Press poll, while #1 Ohio State did not play in a bowl game.
- Disney released Der Fuehrer's Face, an anti-Nazi and anti-Axis propaganda short cartoon featuring Donald Duck. The work later won Academy Award for Best Animated Short Film.
- Born: Don Novello, American comedian known for the character "Father Guido Sarducci" on Saturday Night Live, and as Lazlo Toth in The Lazlo Letters; in Lorain, Ohio

== January 2, 1943 (Saturday) ==
- In the Battle of Buna–Gona, American and Australian forces, under the command of U.S. Army Lt. Gen. Robert L. Eichelberger, were able to capture the New Guinea beachhead at Buna from the Japanese, after the Australian Army had captured Gona on December 9. The Allied victory left only one remaining Japanese stronghold on New Guinea, Sanananda, which would fall two weeks later. General Douglas MacArthur had given Eichelberger the order to "Take Buna, or don't come back alive", which one biographer would describe later as "the absolute nadir of [MacArthur's] generalship."
- The Battle of Gjorm ended in after two days with a decisive victory for the Albanian Resistance fighters over the Italian Army. A total of 186 Italian soldiers and officers were killed, including the commander of the Italian troops, Colonel Franco Clementi, while thousands were wounded and 80 were taken as prisoners of war.
- Born: Barış Manço, Turkish singer and television personality; in Üsküdar (d. 1999)

== January 3, 1943 (Sunday) ==
- While being outfitted, the new Italian cruiser Ulpio Traiano was sunk in Palermo harbor by a British manned torpedo guided by Royal Navy raiders Dick Greenland and Alec Ferrier.
- The 20-room Hollywood mansion of Bing Crosby was destroyed by fire after a short circuit caused a blaze to break out while the family was taking down its Christmas tree.
- The U.S. Selective Service System warned that it would begin prosecuting draft dodgers beginning on February 1. On that date, new rules would require "all men in the 18 to 45 age groups who for six months or more have been subject to registration would have to carry their classification and registration cards with them at all times.
- Born: General Nirmal Chander Vij, Chief of the Army Staff (India) 2003 to 2005; in Jammu, Jammu and Kashmir princely state, British India

== January 4, 1943 (Monday) ==
- General Hideki Tojo, Prime Minister of Japan, determining that the Allies' Guadalcanal Campaign was overcoming Japanese defense, ordered Japan's forces to evacuate Guadalcanal by the end of February. General Hitoshi Imamura would oversee the withdrawal of 10,000 troops from the island in the Solomons chain, abandoning the stronghold to the United States.
- A group of 300 men of the Jewish Fighting Organization tried to launch an uprising in the Częstochowa Ghetto, located in the Polish city of Częstochowa. The attempt was unsuccessful, and as punishment, the Nazi German occupiers shot 250 children and old people the next day. The remaining occupants would be shipped out to concentration camps by June.
- Born: Doris Kearns Goodwin, American writer, historian, and presidential biographer known for her interviews and book about U.S. president Lyndon Johnson, and profiles of other presidents; in Rockville Centre, New York
- Died: Jerzy Iwanow-Szajnowicz, 31, Greek-born Polish athlete and saboteur, was executed in German-occupied Greece.

== January 5, 1943 (Tuesday) ==
- The first use of a VT (variable time) fuze in combat was carried out by the USS Helena, which shot down a Japanese dive bomber with the new type of shell. The "variable time" name was deliberately misleading, to conceal the actual reason that the shell would explode right as it approached its target. Rather than containing a timer, each weapon had a radar that would trigger a detonation as soon as signals indicated that it was within 60 feet of its target.
- At the port of Rabaul on the southwest Pacific Ocean island of New Britain, American bombers under the command of U.S. Army Brigadier General Kenneth Walker scored direct hits on eight Japanese merchant ships and two destroyers. General Walker was killed during the raid when his plane was brought down by Japanese anti-aircraft fire.
- U.S. Secretary of Agriculture Claude R. Wickard ordered manufacturers to reserve 30% of all butter produced, to be used for the U.S. Armed Forces, the first time.

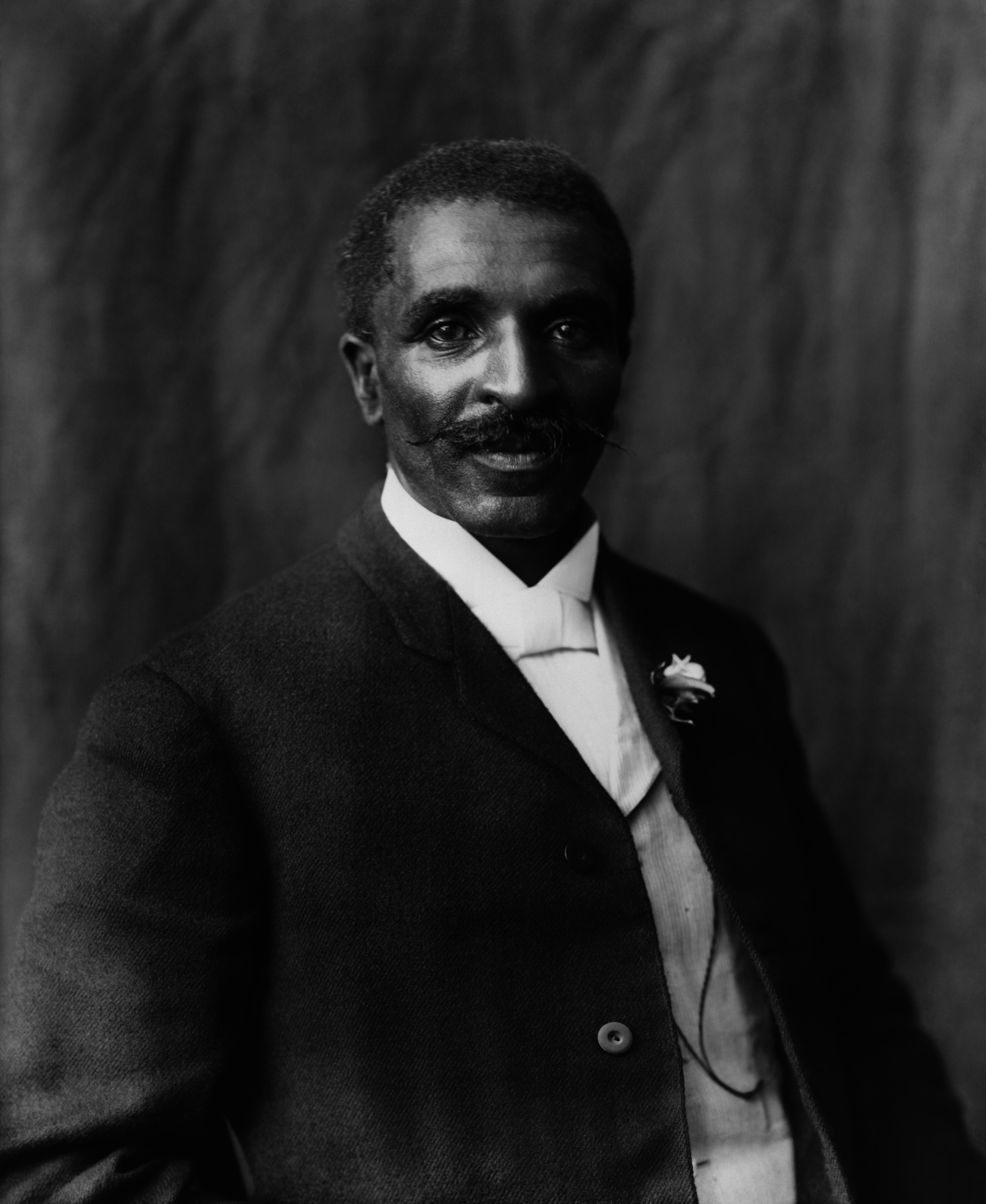
George Washington Carver

- Died:
  - George Washington Carver, 78, African-American inventor and botanist Carver had suffered complications from injuries sustained when he had fallen down a flight of stairs.
  - Caroline O'Day, 73, U.S. Representative for New York since 1935

== January 6, 1943 (Wednesday) ==
- German Grand Admiral Erich Raeder tendered his resignation after a stormy meeting with Adolf Hitler.
- The German submarine U-164 was sunk off Pernambuco, Brazil by an American Consolidated PBY Catalina bomber, five days after the submarine had torpedoed and sunk the neutral Swedish freighter Brageland. Out of 56 crew on U-164, 54 died.
- The United States Office of Price Administration (OPA) banned pleasure driving in 17 states in the Eastern U.S., beginning at noon on Thursday, and lowered the limit of fuel oil that could be used by "schools, churches, stores theaters and other non-residential establishments".
- A fire at the bowling alley in the Southside Beverly Recreation Hall in Chicago killed six people and left 35 hospitalized. The flames quickly moved across bowling lanes that had flammable shellac on them.
- Born: Terry Venables, English football manager known for coaching the England national team (1994-1996) and the Australian national team (1996-1998); in Dagenham, Essex (d. 2023)
- Died: A. Lawrence Lowell, 86, former President of Harvard University, who had "presided during the years of its greatest expansion"

== January 7, 1943 (Thursday) ==
- U.S. President Franklin D. Roosevelt delivered the annual State of the Union speech to a joint session of Congress, revealing that there were seven million men in the armed services, of which 1.5 million were overseas. and stated that "I am confident that though the fighting will be tough, when the final Allied assault is made, the last vestige of Axis power will be driven from the south shores of the Mediterranean." Roosevelt said also that the bombing of Germany and Italy would continue to increase during 1943, adding, "Yes- the Nazis and Fascists have asked for it- and they are going to get it."
- The musical Something for the Boys, with music and lyrics by Cole Porter, began a successful run on Broadway at the Alvin Theatre. It ran for one year, with 422 performances, and then had another successful run on London's West End at the Coliseum Theatre in 1944.
- Born: Sadako Sasaki, Japanese atomic bomb sickness victim; in Kusunoki, Yamaguchi prefecture (d. 1955). Although she was not injured in the bombing of Hiroshima on August 6, 1945, despite being only slightly more than a mile from the blast, she developed leukemia at age 12. She attracted the nation's attention with her mission to fold origami paper cranes as a symbol of peace, and a monument would be erected to her in 1958 as a symbol of innocent victims of war.
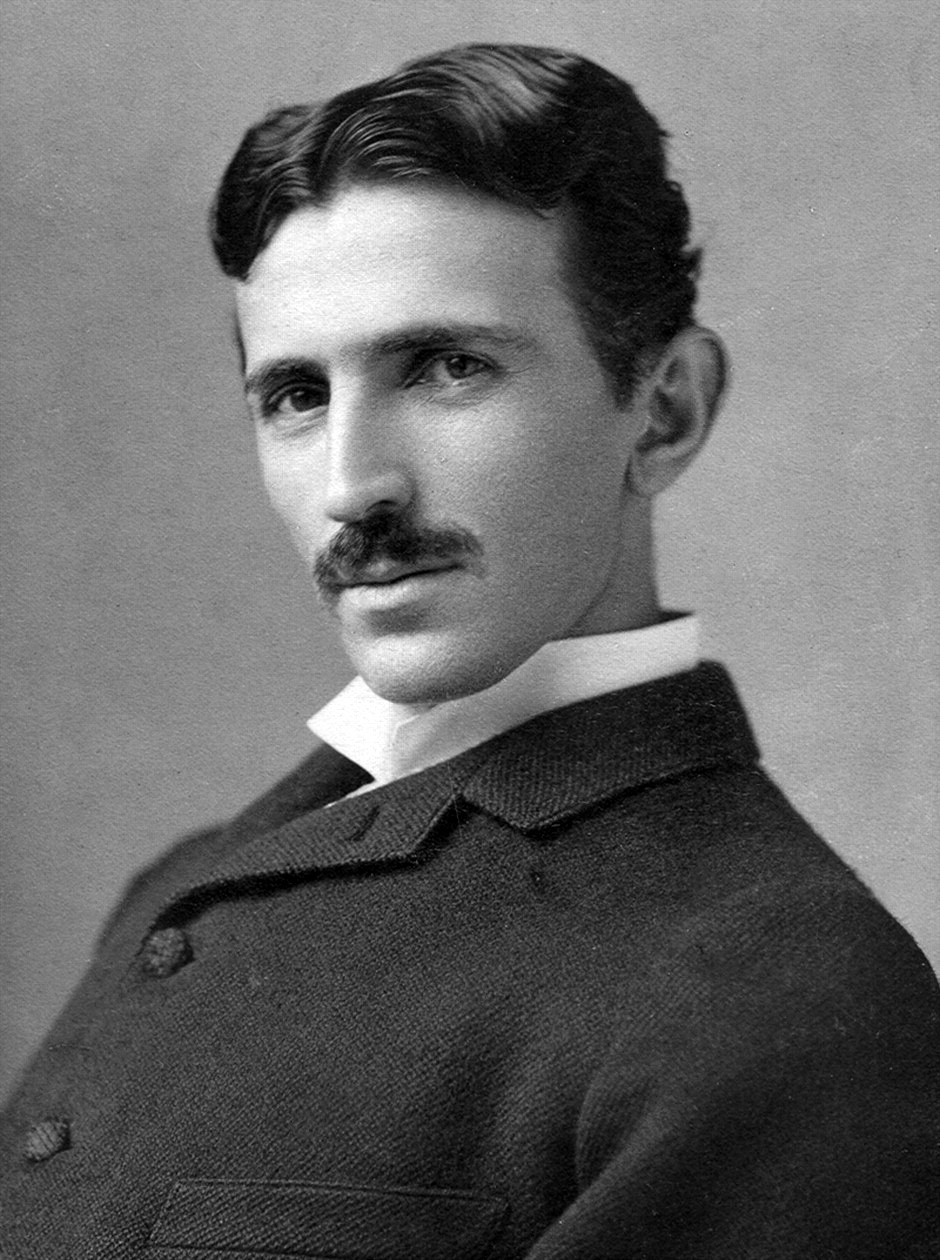
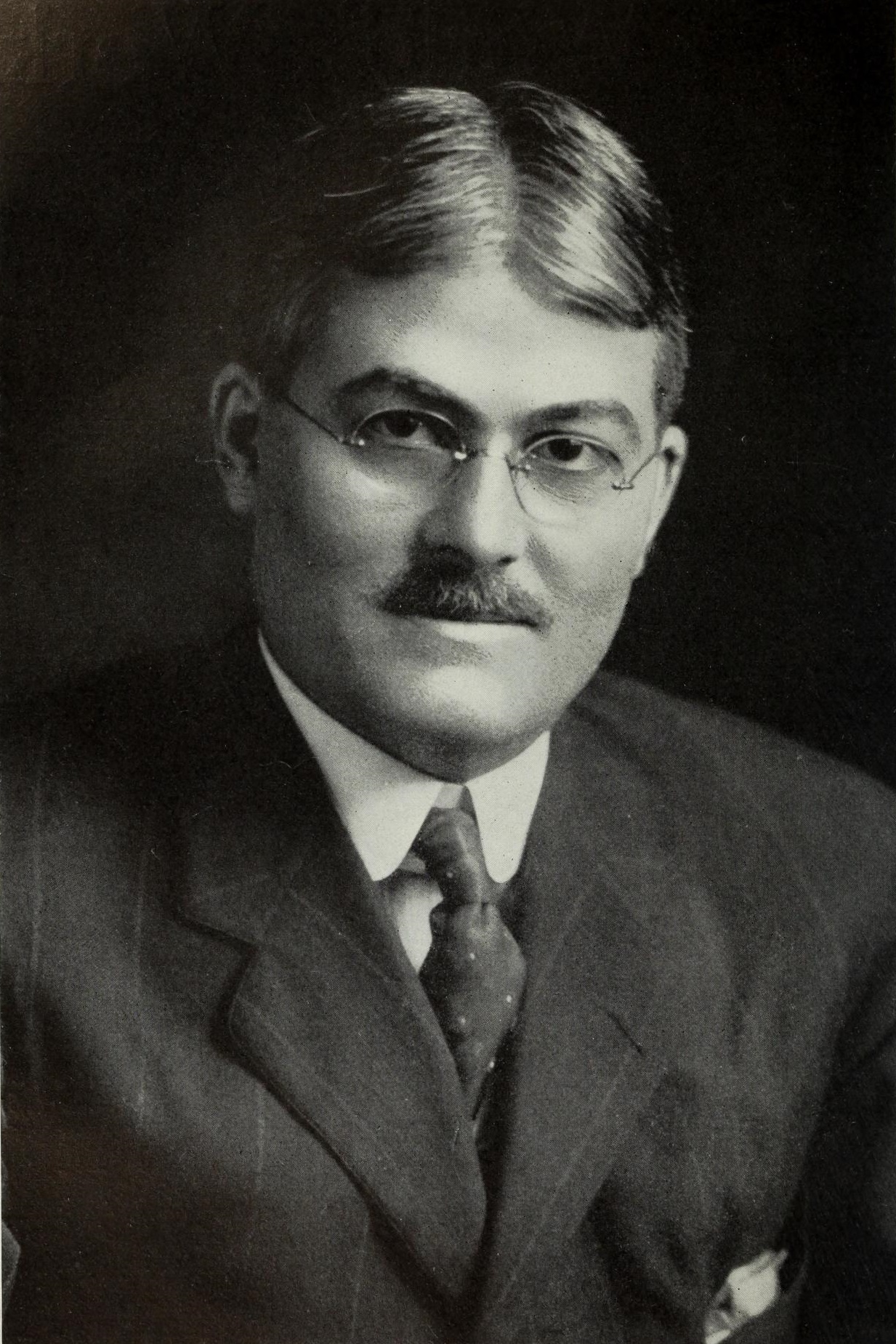
Nikola Tesla and George Washington Crile
- Died:
  - Nikola Tesla, 86, Serbian-American engineer and inventor. Tesla spent his declining years in Room 3327 of the New Yorker Hotel. Due to Tesla's pre-war claims he had invented a "death ray", the United States government removed his files and research notes two days after his death to see whether there was any security risk but the investigator in charge stated they "did not include new, sound, workable principles or methods for realizing such results."
  - Dr. George Washington Crile, 78, co-founder of the Cleveland Clinic and surgeon who had performed the first direct blood transfusion.

== January 8, 1943 (Friday) ==
- With Germany's Sixth Army completely encircled in the Battle of Stalingrad, the Soviet Red Army commander, General Konstantin Rokossovsky, sent an ultimatum to the German commander, General Friedrich Paulus. Rokossovsky gave Paulus until 10:00 the next morning to surrender; if the Germans gave up, Rokossovsky said, they would be provided food and medical assistance. If 10:00 arrived without a surrender, the final attack would begin and the Germans would be destroyed. General Paulus was able to contact Adolf Hitler by radio, but Hitler refused the option to accept the terms. Paulus, who had been skeptical of the Soviet offer, let the ultimatum expire with no reply, and the attack would begin on Sunday.
- Died: Richard Hillary, 23, Spitfire pilot during the Battle of Britain and author of The Last Enemy, was killed when his airplane crashed in England during a training flight.

== January 9, 1943 (Saturday) ==
- Heinrich Himmler, the commander of the German SS, made a personal visit to the Warsaw Ghetto and was furious to discover that there were 40,000 Jews still residing there, despite his orders of July 19 and October 9, 1942, to clear the area before the end of the year. Himmler ordered SS Colonel Ferdinand von Sammern-Frankenegg to liquidate the ghetto by February 15.
- Soviet Jews in the Khmelnytskyi Oblast of the Ukrainian SSR were forcibly removed by Nazi German forces from Ostropol, Krasyliv, Hrytsiv and Syniava, taken to Starokostiantyniv, and shot.
- The prototype of the Constellation airplane, which would be used as a passenger airliner during the 1940s, 1950s and 1960s, made its first flight, with the testing of the Lockheed C-69 Constellation transport plane.
- Born: Freddie Starr (stage name for Frederick Powell), English comedian, singer and TV personality; in Liverpool (d. 2019).
- Died: R. G. Collingwood, 53, British philosopher, died following a series of strokes.

== January 10, 1943 (Sunday) ==
- Operation Ring, the final Soviet assault on the German 6th Army in Stalingrad, began at 8:05 a.m. local time under the command of General Konstantin Rokossovsky. On the city's western side, the Soviet 65th Army advanced from the west, supported by the Soviet 21st Army and 24th Army from the left and right, respectively. The Soviet 66th Army advanced from the north and the Soviet 57th Army and 64th Army from the south. A total of 210,000 soldiers and some 7,000 guns and mortars were committed to the offensive.
- Mustafa Kruja was removed from his office of Prime Minister of Albania by the Italian viceroy, Francesco Jacomini di San Savino, because Kruja was unable to maintain order during the Italian occupation.
- The America First Party was established in Detroit by isolationist crusader Gerald L. K. Smith.
- The American submarine USS Argonaut was depth charged, shelled and sunk south of the Bismarck Archipelago by Japanese destroyers, with the loss of all 102 crew.

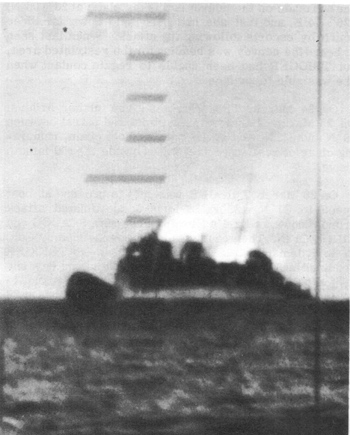
IJN Okikaze sinking, as seen from USS Trigger

- The Japanese destroyer Okikaze was torpedoed and sunk off Katsuura, Chiba by the submarine USS Trigger with the loss of most of its 148 crew.
- Born: Jim Croce, American singer-songwriter; in Philadelphia (killed in plane crash, 1973)

== January 11, 1943 (Monday) ==
- The United States and the United Kingdom signed separate treaties with China, renouncing extraterritoriality privileges that the two nations had held for decades. "The relevant treaties", one historian would observe later, "meant that when China was liberated, there would be no longer British and American enclaves in her territory, that no foreign soldiers would control her seaports, that no British or American warships would be in Chinese waters and that the laws of China and her customs regulations would be drawn up by China and not by Britain, and above all, that there would be no boards with this notice on them: 'Chinese forbidden'."
- Germany and Romania concluded a secret agreement providing for Germany to pay Romania thirty tons of gold and 43,000,000 Swiss francs in return for use of Romanian territory for German bases.
- In the annual budget message to Congress, U.S. president Roosevelt said that new sacrifices and $16 billion in new taxes or "compulsory loans" would be needed to meet spending needs of $100 billion for the war effort, and $9 billion for other purposes.
- With war news delayed by censors, the U.S. Navy revealed the names of ships that were lost in the Battle of the Santa Cruz Islands, including the aircraft carrier USS Hornet, which had been sunk by a kamikaze pilot. Named also were three battle cruisers and seven destroyers.
- British intelligence intercepted and decrypted the Höfle Telegram, a report sent by SS Major Hermann Höfle to his superior, Lt. Col. Adolf Eichmann, regarding the previous year's accomplishments in "Operation Reinhard" the extermination of Polish Jews. The report summed up that, in 1942, the death camps at Lublin, Belzec, Sobibor and Treblinka had killed 1,274,166 Jews. The telegram would not be declassified until 2000.
- SS Major General Heinrich Müller began the deportation of 45,000 Polish Jews to German munitions factories. Over a period of 19 days, 30,000 were taken from Białystok in Poland, 10,000 from Theresienstadt, 3,000 from the Netherlands and 2,000 from Berlin.
- Born:
  - Jill Churchill (pen name for Janice Young Brooks), American mystery writer; in Kansas City, Missouri (d. 2023)
  - Jim Hightower, American radio host, author and journalist, known for The Hightower Lowdown; in Denison, Texas
- Died:
  - Agustín Pedro Justo, 66, President of Argentina from 1932 to 1938
  - Carlo Tresca, 63, Italian-American labor leader, was killed in a drive-by shooting in Manhattan. The crime was never solved.

== January 12, 1943 (Tuesday) ==
- Operation Iskra began at 9:30 am, as the Soviet 67th Army began its final assault on the German occupation of Leningrad.
- The parents of the "Sullivan brothers", five men from Waterloo, Iowa, who had served together on the USS Juneau, were informed that their sons had been listed as "missing in action" since the sinking of that ship in November. The loss of George, Francis, Joseph, Madison and Albert Sullivan was reported as "the heaviest blow suffered by any single family since Pearl Harbor, and probably in American naval history".
- Pierre Laval, the Chief of Government in Nazi-occupied Vichy France, concluded a deal to cede the Departments of Nord and Pas-de-Calais to Germany, as well as pledging the services of 400,000 skilled French workers for German use. The ten-point agreement also legitimized existing German control of industry, finance and agriculture within the occupation zone, while Laval was given authority over the police. Finally, Germany was to receive five destroyers and two large tugs, the remainder of the French fleet at Toulon.
- The American destroyer USS Worden was abandoned after being driven onto rocks at Constantine Harbor on the Alaskan island of Amchitka.
- British Prime Minister Winston Churchill was flown from England to Morocco, where he would make war plans with President Roosevelt. The news was not released until January 27, after his return.
- A group of about 3,000 American troops reclaimed the Alaskan island of Amchitka from Japanese control, and made plans to reclaim Kiska by May.
- Died: Jan Campert, 40, Dutch journalist and writer, died in the Neuengamme concentration camp.

== January 13, 1943 (Wednesday) ==
- Adolf Hitler issued a follow-up to a decree originally issued on December 18, 1942, titled "Führer decree on the full employment of men and women in the defence of the Reich". The new order required all male factory workers, except for those essential for the war effort to be replaced by women, and expanded the conscription of women to all females between the ages of 17 and 50. Together, the decrees of December 18 and January 13 mobilized a large number of women into the German workforce and freed up more men to serve in the military.
- The removal of the Jewish population from the Polish city of Radom was completed. Prior to the German invasion in 1939, Radom had 30,000 Jewish residents, one-third of the total population. A census taken at the end of 1945, after World War II ended, counted only 299 remaining Jews out of a population of 79,000.
- The Soviet Ostrogozhsk–Rossosh offensive began, the first sub-operation of the larger Voronezh–Kharkov Offensive conducted by the Voronezh Front. Seeking to capitalize on the success of Operation Little Saturn, the Soviet 6th Army and 3rd Guards Tank Army struck westward across the upper Don River, aiming to encircle and destroy the Hungarian 2nd Army and the Italian Alpini Corps, a remnant of the Italian 8th Army.
- The German submarine U-224 was depth charged, rammed and sunk west of Algiers by the Canadian corvette Ville de Quebec, and the U-507 was sunk in the Atlantic Ocean by an American PBY Catalina.
- Born: Richard Moll, American comedian and television actor known for playing Bull Shannon on Night Court; in Pasadena, California (d. 2023)

== January 14, 1943 (Thursday) ==
- U.S. President Roosevelt and his aides departed on a secret flight from Washington, D.C. to attend the Casablanca Conference in the capital of Morocco, where they were met by U.K. Prime Minister Churchill, who had departed London in similar secrecy. Their ten-day conference with Generals Charles de Gaulle and Henri Giraud of the Free French forces was described by AP correspondent Wes Gallagher as "the most unprecedented and momentous meeting of the century" and one which "may decide the fate of the world for generations to come". The meetings, held at the Anfa Hotel, concluded on January 24 and were not revealed until three days after the leaders had returned home.
- Japanese forces began Operation Ke, the withdrawal from Guadalcanal, with the delivery of rearguard troops to the island.
- The USS Independence, first of a class of light aircraft carriers, began service for the U.S. Navy.
- American film actress Frances Farmer began a 180-day sentence at the Los Angeles County Jail for violating probation on a drunk driving sentence.
- The propaganda film Hitler's Children had its world premiere in Cincinnati, Ohio and surrounding cities.
- Born:
  - Ralph M. Steinman, Canadian immunologist and cell biologist known for discovering dendritic cells, 2011 Nobel laureate who died three days before the award was announced; in Montreal (d. 2011)
  - Shannon Lucid, American astronaut and biochemist of five space shuttle missions; in Shanghai, China as Shannon Matilda Wells
  - Holland Taylor, American TV, film and stage actress, playwright, and primetime Emmy Award winner (for The Practice); in Philadelphia

== January 15, 1943 (Friday) ==
- USAAF B-24 Liberators bombed a Japanese convoy off the coast of Burma and sank the cargo ship Nichimei Maru. Unbeknownst to the American pilots, the ship was transporting 1,000 Dutch prisoners of war, of whom approximately 37 perished immediately. 16 more, amongst them 5 Australian POW, succumbed to their injuries in the days after on board of the Moji Maru, the second ship in the convoy, which was damaged but still afloat, and in Moulmein .
- The Pentagon, now headquarters of the United States Department of Defense, was dedicated in Arlington, Virginia, only 16 months after construction had started on September 11, 1941. Each of its five sides is 921 feet long and 77 feet high, and the building covers 29 acres.
- All 35 people on a TWA airplane were killed when the C-54 Skymaster, operated under contract for the U.S. Army Air Force, disintegrated while flying over Dutch Guiana (now Suriname) and fell into the rain forest near Reynsdorp (now Bakkie.
- Born: Margaret Beckett, Foreign Secretary of the United Kingdom from 2006 to 2007 and Leader of the House of Commons 1998 to 2001; as Margaret Mary Jackson, in Ashton-under-Lyne, Lancashire
- Died:
  - Jarvis Roosevelt Catoe, 36, American serial killer who strangled ten women between 1935 and 1941, was executed in the electric chair in Washington, D.C.
  - Eric Knight, 45, the English-born American author of Lassie Come-Home, which introduced fictional collie dog "Lassie", was killed in the C-54 cargo plane crash in Dutch Guiana.

== January 16, 1943 (Saturday) ==
- Berlin was bombed for the first time in 14 months, as the United Kingdom's Royal Air Force bombers began the heaviest raid ever on the German capital. A lighter attack had taken place on November 7, 1941. During the night raid, 1,000 tons of bombs fell and fires were visible for 100 miles.
- The Battle for Velikiye Luki ended in a Soviet victory for the 3rd Shock Army over Germany's 59th Army Corps after almost two months of fighting. The surviving 4,500 German troops were taken prisoner, and 5,000 were killed, with 15,000 others wounded and evacuated. The Soviets recorded that 31,674 of their troops were killed or missing, and 72,348 wounded.David M. Glantz and Jonathan House, When Titans Clashed: How the Red Army Stopped Hitler (Lawrence, Kansas: University Press of Kansas, 1995), p. 296 ISBN 0-7006-0899-0
- Iraq entered World War II, declaring war on Germany, Italy and Japan.
- "There Are Such Things" by Tommy Dorsey and His Orchestra hit #1 on the Billboard singles chart.

== January 17, 1943 (Sunday) ==
- The Luftwaffe conducted the first night raid on London since May 1941.
- The giant U.S. tanker ship Schenectady mysteriously fell apart and sank while floating on the Willamette River in Kaiser's Swan Island Shipyard.
- Died: Taj al-Din al-Hasani, 57, President of Syria since 1941, died from pneumonia. Hasani had also served as president from 1928 to 1931, and Prime Minister from 1934 to 1936.

== January 18, 1943 (Monday) ==
- The first Warsaw Ghetto Uprising began on the day that Nazi German soldiers began their second deportation from Warsaw's Jewish ghetto. At 7:00 am, 200 SS troops and another 800 auxiliaries arrived at the ghetto and began the roundup of people to be taken to the Treblinka concentration camp. Members of the Jewish resistance organization Zydowska Organizacja Bojowa (ZOB), led by Mordechai Anielewicz, armed with pistols, worked their way into the crowd of about 1,000 deportees, and, at a pre-arranged signal, emerged and began fighting the Germans. After four days of fighting, the deportations would halt, temporarily.
- The Red Army of the Soviet Union broke the German Wehrmacht's 515-day siege of Leningrad. The Germans had besieged Leningrad since August 21, 1941. That day, General Georgy Zhukov became the first field commander of World War II to be promoted to the rank of Marshal of the Soviet Union and awarded the Order of Suvorov in recognition of "successfully carrying out the general leadership of the counteroffensive at Stalingrad".
- "War Food Order No. 1" went into effect in the United States, requiring for the first time that white bread be enriched with the nutrients niacin, riboflavin, thiamin and iron. Although the federal order expired at the end of World War II, most of the states of the U.S. would continue the requirement after the war by legislation.
- Born: Kay Granger, U.S. Representative (R-Texas) from 1997 to 2025, and Chair of the House Appropriations Committee from 2024 to 2025; in Greenville, Texas
- Died: Mary Kenney O'Sullivan, 79, American labor leader and founder of the Women's Trade Union League

== January 19, 1943 (Tuesday) ==
- The Senate of Chile voted 30–10 in favor of the decision by President Juan Antonio Rios to break off diplomatic relations with the Axis powers, a move that was finalized the next day. The move left Argentina the only Western Hemisphere nation with delegates from Germany, Italy and Japan.
- The Ulyanovsk Oblast was created in the Soviet Union around the city of Ulyanovsk, which had had its name changed from Simbirsk in 1924 to honor its most famous native, Vladimir Ulyanov, better known as Communist Party founder Vladimir Lenin. Unlike most sites in the former Soviet Union, the Ulyanovsk oblast and its capital would retain their names after the fall of Communism.
- The Battle off Zuwarah was fought on the night of January 19–20 between British and Italian forces in Libyan waters. The result was a victory for the Royal Navy as an Italian flotilla of small minesweepers and auxiliary vessels was completely wiped out.
- Born:
  - Janis Joplin, American rock singer known for the hit song "Me and Bobby McGee", and enshrinee in the Rock and Roll Hall of Fame; in Port Arthur, Texas (died of a heroin overdose, 1970)
  - Princess Margriet of the Netherlands, 3rd daughter of Juliana of the Netherlands, in Ottawa during Princess Juliana's exile in Canada during World War II.

== January 20, 1943 (Wednesday) ==
- Germany's daytime bombardment of the Sandhurst Road School killed 41 schoolchildren, ranging in age from 6 to 14 years old, along with six teachers. The school was located in the London suburb of Catford and the German Luftwaffe bombers arrived with little warning.
- Born: Mel Hague, English country music singer and author (d. 2023)

== January 21, 1943 (Thursday) ==
- The crash of Pan Am Flight 1104 killed 19 people, including U.S. Navy Rear Admiral Robert H. English, the commander of the U.S. Pacific submarine fleet. Flight 1104 had departed Hawaii's Pearl Harbor on the way to San Francisco. Flying at low altitude in bad weather, the plane slammed into a mountainside in Mendocino County, California. The wreckage would not be located until ten days later.
- U-301, a German submarine, was torpedoed and sunk off Corsica by the British submarine HMS Sahib. Only one member of the 46 crew survived.

== January 22, 1943 (Friday) ==
- Papua "became the first complete geographical unit to be won back from the Japanese", as Allied forces drove out the last pockets of Japan's resistance following the capture of Sanananda. Australia lost 2,000 men, the United States, 600, and the Japanese 13,000 men, with only 1,200 surviving from the occupation of Papua. "For the first time in World War II", one author would note, "the Allies had defeated the Japanese in a land operation."
- In one of the fastest weather-related increases in temperature on record, the Weather Bureau in Spearfish, South Dakota noted an increase from -4 °F at 7:30 am, to 45 °F two minutes later at 7:32 am, which an investigator concluded was "the result of the wavering motion of a pronounced quasistationary front separating Continental Arctic air from Maritime Polar air", possibly contributed to by a chinook wind. After peaking at 54 °F at 9:00 am, the temperature was back at 4 below zero by 9:27. At Rapid City, temperatures rose from 5° to 54° in twenty minutes (9:20am – 9:40am), so rapidly "that buildings were exprinecing winter on one side and spring around the corner".
- The Germans lost their last airfield at Stalingrad when Gumrak was taken.
- Margaret Bourke-White became the first woman to ever fly along on a United States Army Air Force bombing mission, accompanying the 97th Bomb Group on a B-17 bomber, the Little Bill, which was attacking a German held airfield in Tunis.
- The Round up of Marseille began with the detention of over 4,000 Jews in Nazi-occupied Marseille as part of "Action Tiger", before being transported to extermination camps in Poland.
- U.S. President Roosevelt and Sultan Mohammed V of Morocco dined together at Anfa in a meeting that one author says "changed history". According to the President's son, Elliott Roosevelt, FDR said, "Why does Morocco, inhabited by Moroccans, belong to France? Anything must be better than to live under French colonial rule," and added "When we've won the war, I will work with all my might and main to see to it that the United States is not wheedled into the position of accepting any plan that will further France's imperialistic ambitions."

== January 23, 1943 (Saturday) ==
- The British 8th Army, under the command of General Bernard Montgomery captured Tripoli from Italy. The Italian Governor, Alberto Denti di Piranjo, formally surrendered to the British, relinquishing Italian control of Libya that had started in 1912.
- The classic film Casablanca, starring Humphrey Bogart and Ingrid Bergman, was released nationwide in the United States, after a successful opening in New York on Thanksgiving Day, 1942. Coincidentally, U.S. President Roosevelt was secretly in the Moroccan capital of Casablanca at the time of the film's release.
- The Battle of Gifu on Guadalcanal ended after 39 days of fighting in a victory for the U.S. Army XIV Corps and the New Zealand Expeditionary Force over the Japanese 17th Army and the Imperial Japanese 8th Fleet, and the Japanese withdrawal.
- The Japanese destroyer Hakaze was sunk south of Kavieng by the American submarine Guardfish.
- Duke Ellington played at New York City's Carnegie Hall for the first time, where he premiered his jazz symphony, "Black, Brown and Beige".
- Critic and commentator Alexander Woollcott suffered a fatal heart attack during a live broadcast of the 7:00 pm CBS Radio program The People's Platform, and died four hours later. Woollcott contributed remarks earlier in that night's program, a panel discussion on the subject of Adolf Hitler's ten years in power, and later passed a note to the moderator to say that he felt ill. Woollcott was escorted from the studio "while the broadcast continued, listeners unaware that anything untoward had happened."
- British Commandos carried out Operation Cartoon, an overnight raid on the island of Stord in Norway.
- Died: Alexander Woollcott, 58, American drama critic, died of a cerebral hemorrhage after becoming ill while on a live broadcast of the CBS radio show The People's Platform

== January 24, 1943 (Sunday) ==
- The Casablanca Declaration was issued at the close of the Casablanca Conference in Morocco. U.S. President Roosevelt announced, to the few correspondents permitted to go along on the secret trip, that he and U.K. Prime Minister Churchill had agreed that the Allies would accept nothing less than the unconditional surrender of the Axis Powers. "It does not mean the destruction of the population of Germany, Italy, or Japan," Roosevelt said, "but it does mean the destruction of the philosophies in those countries which are based on conquest and the subjugation of other people." The news would not be released until both leaders returned home from Morocco.
- For the first time since World War Two began, Germany's newspapers began printing pessimistic reports "apparently preparing the Germans for news of a disastrous defeat on the Eastern Front". The Völkischer Beobachter and the Börsen Zeitung were among those that carried the commentary from Karl Megerle, who wrote that "For the first time in this war, Germany faces reverses of a certain importance." At the same time, the Berlin correspondent for the Swedish newspaper Aftonbladet reported that German radio had started playing "mourning music" between its news reports "instead of the usual lively tunes."
- The destroyer USS Radford became the first ship to shoot down a plane without ever seeing it, relying solely on radar to spot an approaching Japanese aircraft at Guadalcanal.
- The German cargo steamship Hans Schmidt struck a mine west of Pola and sank.
- Born: Sharon Tate, American actress and model murdered by the "Manson Family"; in Dallas (d. 1969)
- Died:
  - John Burns, 84, British politician who became the first person to rise from manual labor to becoming a British government minister (as President of the Local Government Board from 1905 to 1914 for Prime Ministers Campbell-Bannerman and Asquith)
  - Joe Choynski, 74, American boxer known as the "last of the old-time bare-knuckle fighters", world light heavyweight champion in 1899

== January 25, 1943 (Monday) ==
- Five days before the 1939-1943 session of Germany's parliament, the Reichstag, was scheduled to end, Adolf Hitler issued the decree that "The tenure of the presently existing Reichstag is extended until January 30, 1947." The new decree superseded one that Hitler had issued in 1939, requiring a new election to be held "within sixty days" after the Reichstag's four-year tenure had terminated, hence eliminating the need for elections before March 30.
- The two separate thrusts of Soviet troops met in the center of Stalingrad, cutting the remaining German forces into two small pockets.
- Born: Tobe Hooper, American horror film producer and director known for The Texas Chain Saw Massacre (1974) and Poltergeist (1982); in Austin, Texas (d. 2017)
- Died: Jay Pierrepont Moffat, 47, U.S. Ambassador to Canada since 1940, died of complications from surgery for phlebitis.

== January 26, 1943 (Tuesday) ==
- Soviet Premier Stalin announced that in the winter offensive to drive out the Nazis, the Red Army had destroyed 102 German Army divisions and captured 200,000 prisoners.
- In the Battle of Nikolayevka in Russia, the Italian 2nd Alpine Division "Tridentina", and other survivors of the Italian Army who were surrounded during the Ostrogozhsk-Rossosh Offensive, broke out of the Soviet encirclement and reached safety. This event would later be memorialized by Alpini veterans, as only 18,000 men survived out of the approximately 60,000 originally encircled.
- Occupying Nazi German forces in the Netherlands rounded up 1,200 Jews in the city of Apeldoorn and deported them to concentration camps.
- Born: César Gutiérrez, Venezuelan Major League Baseball and Venezuelan League player; in Santa Ana de Coro (d. 2005)
- Died: Nikolai Vavilov, 55, Russian botanist and geneticist, died from starvation at a Soviet labor camp near Saratov

== January 27, 1943 (Wednesday) ==
- Ninety-one bombers from the U.S. Eighth Air Force, a combination of B-17 Flying Fortresses and B-24 Liberators, mounted the first American airstrike inside Germany. Fifty-five of the B-17s made a daylight raid on the submarine bases at Wilhelmshaven. All of the aircraft were able to return to base.
- The Ostrogozhsk–Rossosh Offensive was completed with a Soviet victory over the invading Axis forces (Hungarian 2nd Army and the Italian Alpini Corps, a remnant of the Italian 8th Army).
- The Office of Price Administration (USA) announced that "all edible meats" would be rationed beginning on April 1, after months of asking consumers to voluntarily limit their consumption.
- The comedy film They Got Me Covered starring Bob Hope and Dorothy Lamour premiered in San Francisco.

== January 28, 1943 (Thursday) ==
- U.S. Secretary of War Henry L. Stimson announced that the War Department would "ease restrictions on Americans of Japanese ancestry and employ loyal ones in war work", with the formation of a Japanese-American army unit. "It is the inherent right of every faithful citizen, regardless of ancestry, to bear arms in the nation's battle," Stimson said, at a time when most (120,000) Japanese-Americans had been confined to internment camps.
- Japanese submarine I-65 shelled the Western Australian town of Port Gregory, but did no damage.
- Born: John Beck, American film and television, known for the film Rollerball for a role on TV show Dallas actor; in Chicago
- Died: Glyndwr Michael, 34, Welsh homeless man whose body would be used for Britain's Operation Mincemeat to deceive Axis intelligence into expecting an attack on Italy to start from Sardinia rather than Sicily. On April 30, with papers identifying him as Major William Martin, and a set of "top secret" invasion plans, Michael would be dumped into the sea in a successful disinformation campaign. Michael's true identity would be revealed 55 years later.

== January 29, 1943 (Friday) ==
- Germany's national radio network, the DNB, broadcast news of a decree that would draft "all men from 16 to 65 and all women from 17 to 45" for "labor", a day before the tenth anniversary of Adolf Hitler's appointment as Chancellor.
- In the Pacific, the Battle of Rennell Island (led by the U.S. Navy) and the Battle of Wau (by the Australian Navy) began as part of the Allied New Guinea campaign.
- The Marine Corps Women's Reserve (MCWR) was created.
- The Japanese submarine I-1 ran aground and was wrecked at Kamimbo Bay, Guadalcanal during a surface battle with New Zealand minesweepers.
- The war film Immortal Sergeant starring Henry Fonda and Maureen O'Hara was released.
- Born:
  - Tony Blackburn, British radio disc jockey and TV host; in Guildford, Surrey
  - Pat Quinn, Canadian NHL ice hockey player (1967-1977) and head coach for the Canadian Olympic men's team and five NHL teams from 1978-2010), inductee to the Hockey Hall of Fame; ; in Hamilton, Ontario (d. 2014)
  - Rudy Regalado, Venezuelan musician; in Caracas (d. 2010)

== January 30, 1943 (Saturday) ==
- On the 10th Anniversary of Hitler's assumption of power in Germany, General Friedrich Paulus was promoted to the rank of Field Marshal and instructed to fight to the death in Stalingrad, while Karl Dönitz was promoted to Commander in Chief of the German Navy, replacing Erich Raeder.
- RAF Bomber Command made daylight raids on Berlin to disrupt commemorative speeches and rallies.
- The Battle of Rennell Island in the Solomon Islands ended after two days when the Japanese forced a U.S. Navy withdrawal, protecting the ongoing Japanese evacuation of Guadalcanal. In the course of the evacuation, the battle cruiser USS Chicago was sunk by Japanese aerial torpedoes, with the loss of 62 of her crew, but USS Navajo and other escorts rescued 1,049 survivors. The destroyer USS La Vallette was struck by a torpedo, killing 22 of her crew.
- Operation Iskra concluded with the German Siege of Leningrad being eased though not completely broken.
- Pierre Laval founded the Milice, a Gestapo-like security police force in France, to fight the French Resistance. Joseph Darnand was placed in charge of the police unit.
- Born: Davey Johnson, baseball player and manager, MLB Manager of the Year 1997 (for Baltimore) and 2012 (for Washington); in Orlando, Florida (d.2025)
- Died: Attila Petschauer, 38, Hungarian Olympic fencer, gold medalist in 1928 and 1932, died in the Davidovka concentration camp in German-occupied Ukraine, where he and other Hungarian Jews had been deported by the German SS.

== January 31, 1943 (Sunday) ==
- At 7:35 in the morning in Stalingrad, Field Marshal Friedrich Paulus surrendered 90,000 German troops to Soviet Army Lt. Fyodor Ilchenko. Of the 250,000 German troops that had invaded the Soviet Union, less than 5,000 would ever return home.
- President Roosevelt returned to the White House after having been away for 23 days in conferences in Morocco, Liberia and Brazil.
- The Battle of Wau ended in decisive Allied victory.
- A fire at the Lake Forest Sanitarium for invalids near Seattle killed 28 people.
