= February 1943 =

Month of 1943

<<	February 1943					>>
Su	Mo	Tu	We	Th	Fr	Sa
	1	2	3	4	5	6
7	8	9	10	11	12	13
14	15	16	17	18	19	20
21	22	23	24	25	26	27
28

The following events occurred in February 1943:

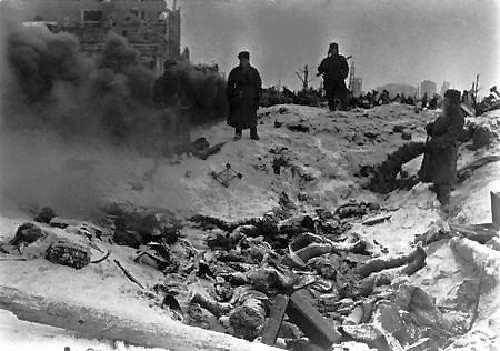
February 2, 1943: The Soviet Union retakes Stalingrad as 462 day fight ends

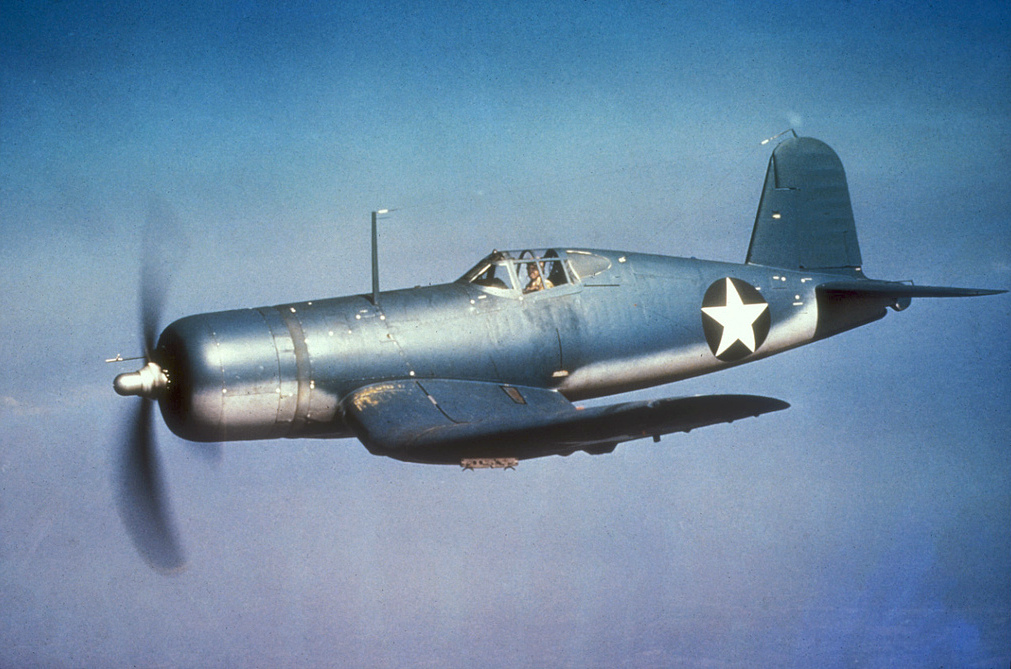
February 13, 1943: The Corsair begins combat operations

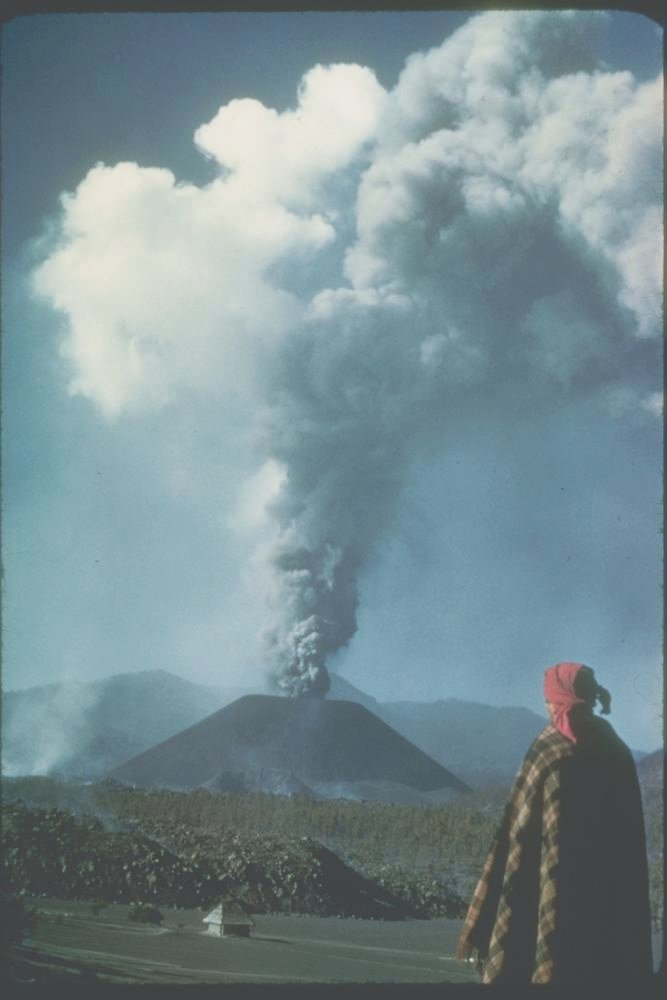
February 20, 1943: Volcano appears in Mexico

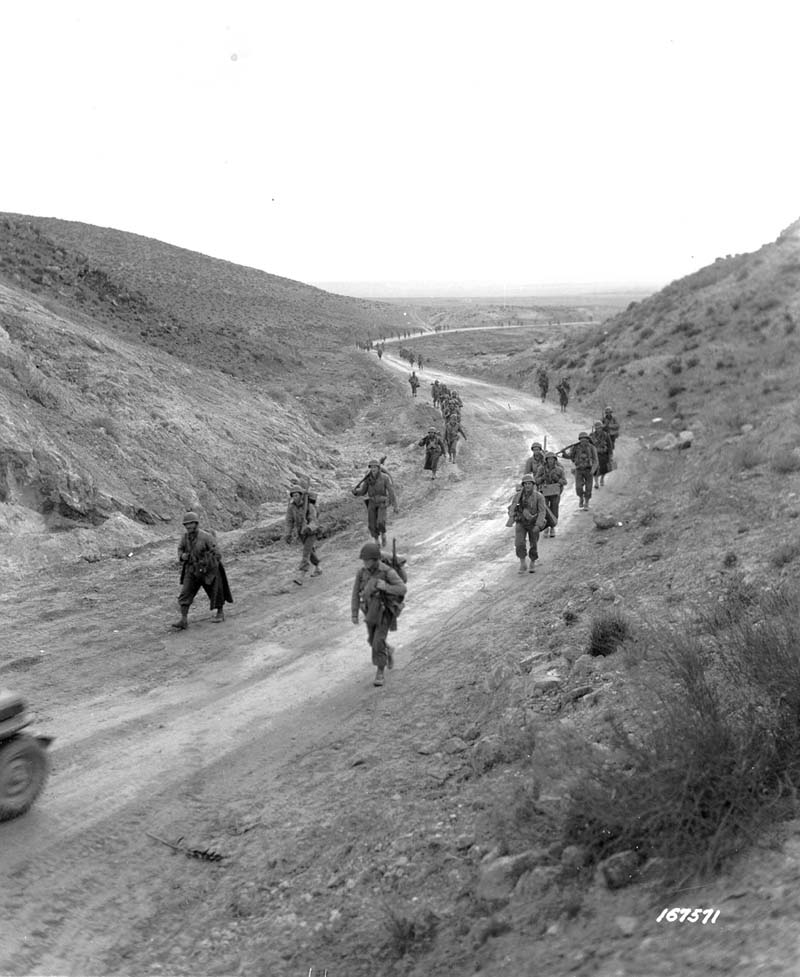
February 24, 1943: In North Africa, the U.S. Army recovers after being defeated by Germany's Afrika Corps

== February 1, 1943 (Monday) ==
- The 442nd Infantry Regiment, whose soldiers were Nisei (Americans of Japanese ancestry), was created by order of U.S. President Franklin D. Roosevelt. "No natural citizen of the United States," said the President, "should be denied the democratic right to exercise the responsibilities of his citizenship, regardless of his ancestry." Most Nisei in the mainland United States were still kept in internment camps at the time.
- Japanese forces on Guadalcanal began the actual withdrawal phase of Operation Ke. The Americans mistakenly believed the naval activity signaled a new offensive and put up little opposition.

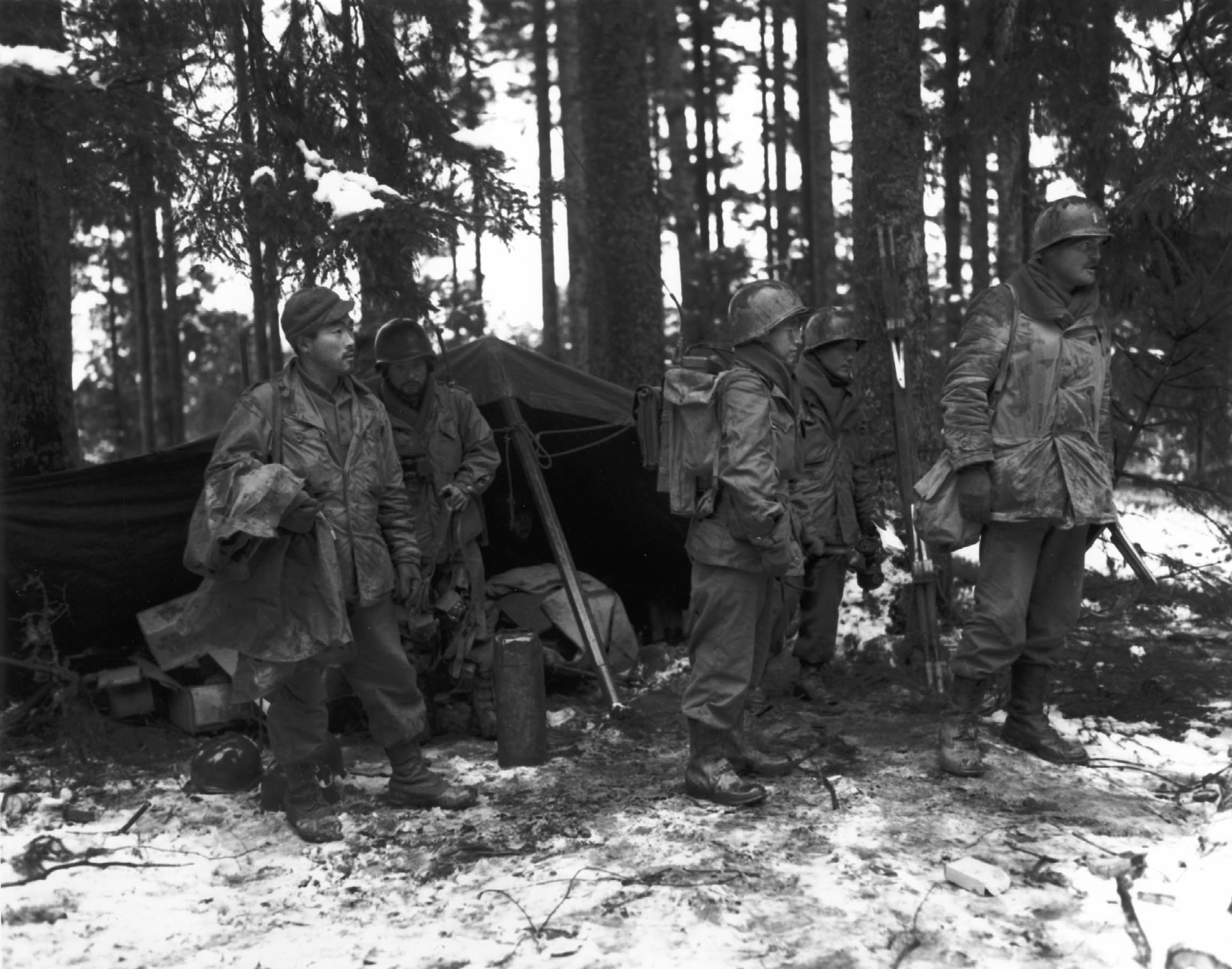
Japanese-American soldiers of the 442nd Infantry

- Vittorio Ambrosio replaced Ugo Cavallero as supreme commander of Italian forces.
- The American destroyer De Haven was bombed and sunk east of Savo Island in the Solomon Islands by Japanese aircraft, with the loss of 167 troops. The wreckage of De Haven would be discovered at the bottom of "Ironbottom Sound" 49 years later, by oceanographer Robert Ballard in 1992, and with its identification confirmed on July 8, 2025.

== February 2, 1943 (Tuesday) ==
- The Soviet Union announced that the 163-day Battle of Stalingrad had ended after the last of the German Sixth Army forces surrendered.
- Born: Akhtar Raza Khan, Muslim scholar, and Grand Mufti of India; in Bareilly, United Provinces, British India (now Uttar Pradesh state) (d. 2018)
- Died: Sir Rao Ganga Singh, 62, British Indian General, the only non-white member of the Imperial War Cabinet constituted by Britain during World War One, and the penultimate Maharaja of Bikaner

== February 3, 1943 (Wednesday) ==
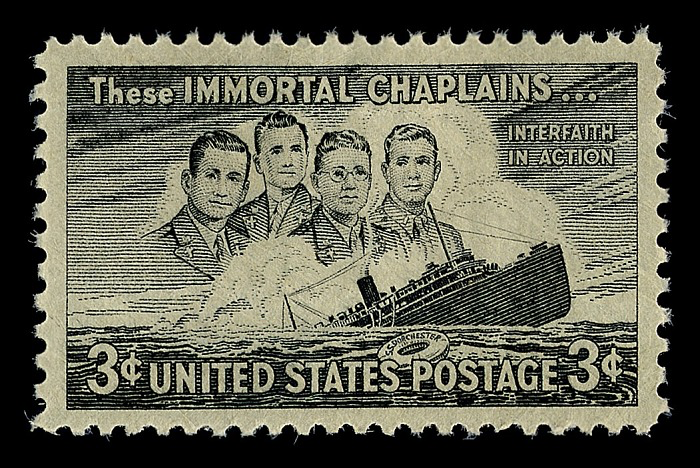

- The U.S. troop transport Dorchester, with 904 men on board, was torpedoed 150 miles off of the coast of Greenland by the German submarine U-233. Among the 605 people who died were the "Four Chaplains"— Methodist minister George L. Fox, Reformed Church in America minister Clark V. Poling, Roman Catholic priest John P. Washington, and Rabbi Alexander D. Goode— who helped others evacuate into lifeboats, gave up their lifejackets, and then went down with the ship. Other victims died of hypothermia in the icy waters. Another 299 were saved by the U.S. Coast Guard cutters Escanaba and Comanche. The "retriever" method of rescue was used for the first time, as swimmers from the Escanaba donned wet suits to reach those victims who were too exhausted to climb aboard rescue lifeboats.
- The German submarine U-265 was sunk in the Atlantic Ocean along with its entire crew of 46 men, by a B-17 of No. 220 Squadron RAF.
- The Howard Hawks-directed war film Air Force premiered in New York City.
- Born: Blythe Danner, American film, TV and stage actress, in Philadelphia

== February 4, 1943 (Thursday) ==
- With the British Eighth Army's success in its African campaign, the remaining German forces in modern-day Libya, along with their commander, Field Marshal Erwin Rommel, withdrew across the border into French Tunisia, where they would be defeated in May.
- The German submarine U-187 was depth charged and sunk in the Atlantic Ocean by British destroyers. Nine of its crew of 54 died, while 43 were rescued.
- Died: Frank Calder, 65, President of the National Hockey League since its founding in 1917

== February 5, 1943 (Friday) ==
- Italian Prime Minister Benito Mussolini fired his Foreign Minister, Count Galeazzo Ciano, who was also Mussolini's son-in-law, along with most of the other cabinet ministers. The new Foreign Minister was Mussolini himself, who also held the posts of Interior Minister, War Minister, and Air Minister.
- U.S. Army Air Forces Lt. General Frank M. Andrews was named as the new commander of all U.S. forces in Europe, taking over a command formerly held by Lt. General Eisenhower, who had also commanded U.S. forces in Europe and North Africa. Lt. General Andrews would be killed in a plane crash less than three months later, on May 3, 1943.
- At a meeting between shoe manufacturers and U.S. Army generals, Lt. Col. Georges Doriot (who would pioneer the business of venture capital) persuaded General George Marshall to approve the acquisition of a more durable type of combat boot for American soldiers. At the time, the average lifespan of the existing U.S. Army boots was only 13 days.
- Born:
  - Nolan Bushnell, American video game pioneer; in Clearfield, Utah
  - Michael Mann, American film director, writer, and producer; in Chicago
  - Craig Morton, American NFL quarterback; in Flint, Michigan
- Died: W. S. Van Dyke, 53, American film director

== February 6, 1943 (Saturday) ==
- The arrest of 600 students was conducted on campuses across the Netherlands by the occupying German forces, after a fatally wounded Nazi officer said that he had been shot by students. The 600 were deported to the Herzogenbusch concentration camp near Vught. Another 1,200 were arrested and deported a few days later.
- Field Marshal Erich von Manstein flew to see Adolf Hitler seeking permission to fall back on the Eastern Front. Hitler agreed to allow German forces to withdraw to new defensive positions along the Mius River.
- Lt. General Dwight D. Eisenhower was named commander of the Allied armies in the African theater of operations (Tunisia, Algeria and Morocco), based on a decision made by President Roosevelt and Prime Minister Churchill at Casablanca. Previously, Eisenhower's command was limited to U.S. forces in North Africa.
- The Canadian corvette Louisburg was bombed and sunk off Oran, Algeria by Italian aircraft.
- A Los Angeles court acquitted the movie star Errol Flynn of three rape charges.
- Born: Fabian (Fabiano Anthony Forte), American singer and teen idol; in Philadelphia

== February 7, 1943 (Sunday) ==
- Operation Ke was completed when the remaining 10,000 Japanese troops on the island of Guadalcanal were secretly evacuated to rescuing ships "before U.S. forces realized what had occurred". The "Japanese Dunkirk" during the Guadalcanal Campaign was accomplished by deceiving U.S. intelligence into believing that the ships were arriving to bring in reinforcements for a new attack.
- German Führer Adolf Hitler brought top-ranking officials of both Germany and the Nazi Party to his headquarters to reassure them despite the devastating defeat suffered on the Russian front. One of Hitler's aides, Nicolaus von Below, would later recall that Hitler's speech was so inspiring that the officials were "obviously relieved" and came away believing that Germany could still win World War II. Records of the meeting showed that Hitler said, "Either we will be the master of Europe, or we will experience a complete liquidation and extermination," and pledged a total war against the remaining Jewish people in Germany, and the "international Jews" who, in his view, forged an alliance between capitalists and Communists.
- The American troopship USS Henry R. Mallory was torpedoed by the U-402, a German U-boat, killing 272 Americans.
- The German submarine U-609 was sunk by depth charges from the French corvette Lobelia with the loss of all crew. The German submarine U-624 was sunk by a Royal Air Force B-17 that dropped depth charges on U-624 while was on the surface and transmitting a lengthy report of its actions the night before. All 45 on board were killed.
- Born: Gareth Hunt, English television actor; in Battersea, London (d. 2007)
- Died: Howard W. Gilmore, 40, American U.S. Navy Commander, in an act for which he posthumously received the Medal of Honor. Gilmore was in the conning tower of the submarine USS Growler when it came under attack from the Japanese gunboat Hayasaki. Wounded by gunfire, and unable to climb down the hatch, Gilmore ordered the submarine to submerge, despite the certainty that he would drown, in order for his shipmates to escape destruction.

== February 8, 1943 (Monday) ==
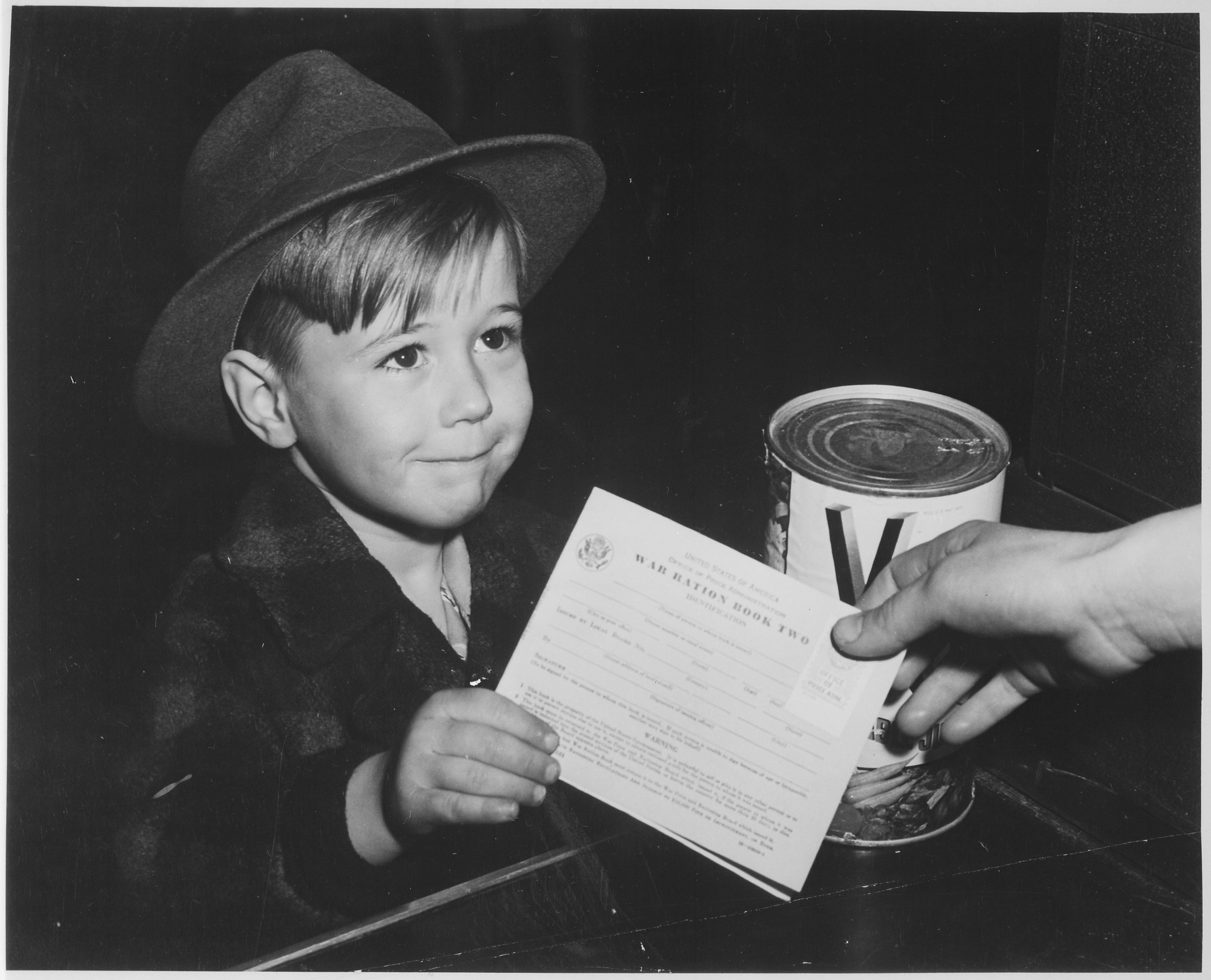
"An eager schoolboy gets his first experience in using War Ration Book Two. With many parents engaged in war work, children are being taught the facts of point rationing for helping out in family marketing.", 02/1943

- After touring Germany as a guest of the Third Reich to give anti-British speeches, Indian nationalist Subhas Chandra Bose and his assistant, Abid Hasan, were given safe passage from Kiel by the German submarine U-180.
- The U.S. Territory of Hawaii, under American military authority since the 1941 attack on Pearl Harbor, was partially restored to civilian control by its Military Governor, Lt. General Delos Emmons, with the decree taking effect on March 10. The Territorial Legislature, absent its nine Japanese-American members, reassembled on February 17 for the first time in more than a year.
- German forces, retreating from the Soviet Union, liquidated the remaining Jews in the Byelorussian S.S.R. city of Slutsk. Commander Eduard Strauch directed his soldiers from Minsk to oversee the deportation of the remaining 4,000 Jews.
- Nazi forces in Belarus began Operation Hornung, a counterattack against Belarusan partisans.
- The 60th Army of the Soviet Voronezh Front captured Kursk.
- U.S. Economic Stabilization Director James F. Byrnes ordered a temporary ban on the sale of shoes until Tuesday, when rationing would begin. Starting February 10 and at least through June 15, one pair of shoes could be purchased only by using "Stamp No. 17 in war ration book No. 1", which previously applied only to sugar and coffee. House slippers, ballet slippers and baby shoes were exempt from the order because their production was not affected by the limited supply of leather.
- Wiley B. Rutledge was confirmed by the U.S. Senate as a new Justice of the United States Supreme Court by voice vote, despite the opposition of Senator William Langer of North Dakota. Rutledge would serve for only six years before dying of a stroke at the age of 55 in 1949.
- Born:
  - Creed Bratton (stage name for William Charles Schneider), American actor and musician; in Los Angeles
  - Valerie Thomas, American scientist and inventor; in Baltimore

== February 9, 1943 (Tuesday) ==
- "Tokyo Express no longer has a terminus on Guadalcanal" was the nine-word message sent by U.S. Army Major General Alexander Patch to U.S. Navy Admiral William Halsey, Jr., as the strategic South Pacific island was recaptured from Japan. During the six month fight, the Japanese lost 24,000 killed, while the U.S. sustained 1,653 deaths.
- With 1,481 people aboard (1,283 troops and 198 crew), the Japanese Imperial Navy ship Tatsuta Maru, an ocean liner converted to military use, was torpedoed and sunk east of Mikura-jima, by the American submarine USS Tarpon. Because the sinking took place during a gale, its the destroyer Yamagumo was unable to rescue any survivors.
- The Rue Sainte-Catherine Roundup took place in the Jewish section of the French city of Lyon, as Klaus Barbie directed the Gestapo's arrest of 86 Jews for deportation to the Drancy internment camp. Of the 86 arrested, only six survived to return home.
- U.S. President Roosevelt issued an Executive Order establishing "a minimum war time work week of 48 hours" in 32 American cities that had shortages of employees. However, employees would still receive "time and a half" for more than 40 hours work in a week. Larger cities affected were Baltimore, Buffalo, Detroit, Las Vegas, Portland, Oregon, San Diego, Seattle, and Washington, D.C., but the order also applied to places like Manitowoc, Wisconsin, Pascagoula, Mississippi and Somerville, New Jersey.
- Born:
  - Joe Pesci, American film actor known for Raging Bull, Goodfellas and My Cousin Vinny; in Newark, New Jersey
  - Joseph E. Stiglitz, American economist, 2001 Nobel Prize in Economics laureate; in Gary, Indiana

== February 10, 1943 (Wednesday) ==
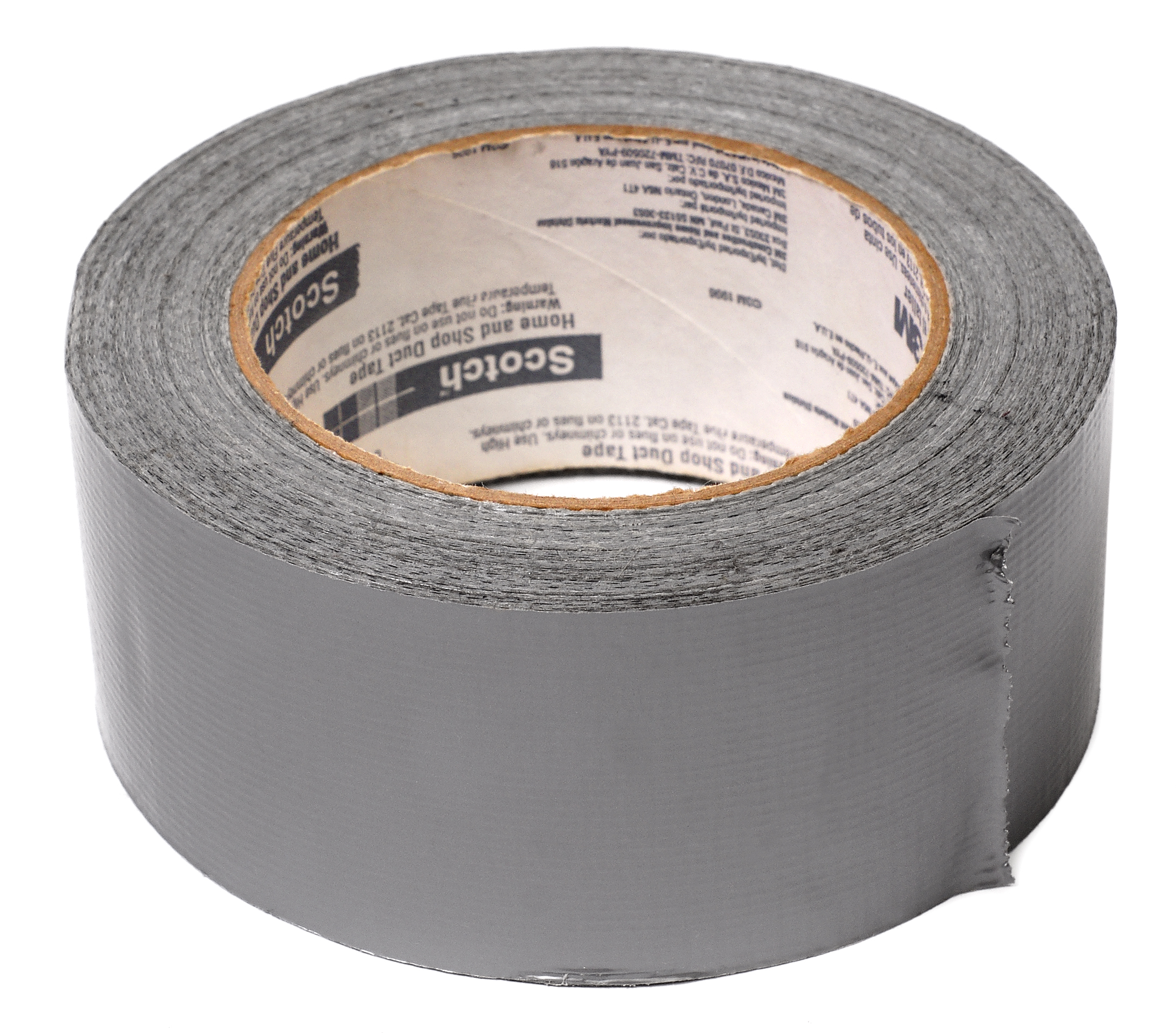
Suggested by Vesta Stout

- Mrs. Vesta Stoudt, an ordnance factory worker from Sterling, Illinois, and the mother of two sons who were in the U.S. Navy, wrote to President Roosevelt with her idea for what would become duct tape, which she described as "a strong cloth tape" that had a waterproof wax coating, designed to seal boxes of ammunition, but that could also be opened quickly. Stoudt had been unable to persuade her supervisors at the Green River Ordnance Plant that it would be an improvement over thin paper tape. Roosevelt liked the idea and on March 26, 1943, the War Production Board would inform Mrs. Stoudt that it had approved the idea.
- The Battle of Timor, which had started on February 19, 1942, in Dutch Timor (now part of Indonesia) on February 19, 1942, ended after 354 days with a Japanese tactical victory as the Allies (primarily Australia's Sparrow Force and the Netherlands) withdrew, but an Allied strategic victory. While the Allies lost slightly more than 500 men out of 3,050 the Japanese lost more than 4,000 out of 12,000 committed. More than 40,000 and perhaps as many as 70,000 Timorese civilians were killed by the Japanese.
- The Battle of Krasny Bor between the Soviet Army and Germany began in the Leningrad sector and would last for three days.Glantz, David M. (2002). The Battle for Leningrad 1941–1944. Kansas University Press. pp. 284–294. ISBN 0-7006-1208-4.
- The 13th Waffen-SS Division began recruiting troops, primarily from the Bosnian Moslem community in the Nazi German-created Independent State of Croatia. The 13th was the first SS formation to employ non-Germanic men.
- A striking new development provided a new burst of political activity in British India. Mohandas Gandhi, imprisoned in British India, started hunger strike [fast] on 10 February in jail. He declared the fast would last for twenty-one days. This was his answer to the Government and specially Viceroy Lord Linlithgow which had been constantly exhorting him to condemn the violence of the people in the Quit India Movement. Gandhi not only refused to condemn the people's resort to violence but unequivocally held the Government responsible for it. It was the 'leonine violence' of the state which had provoked the people, he said. And it was against this violence of the state, which included the unwarranted detention of thousands of Congressmen, that Gandhi vowed to register his protest, in the only way open to him when in jail, by fasting. The Viceroy decided that if Gandhi fasted, he would be allowed to die. But fast was to create moral support and create pressure thus as planned Gandhi's fast ceased after 21 days, he remained imprisoned until May 6, 1944.

== February 11, 1943 (Thursday) ==
- The Soviet Union began its nuclear weapons research program, by State Defense Committee resolution signed by Josef Stalin. Physicist Igor Kurchatov was appointed as the program's director.
- U.S. Army Lieutenant General Dwight D. Eisenhower was promoted to the four-star rank for the first time. Coincidentally, Nikita Khrushchev, who would lead the Soviet Union at the same time that Dwight Eisenhower was President of the U.S., was promoted to the rank of Lieutenant General in the Soviet Army the next day.
- Transport 47 left Drancy internment camp for Auschwitz concentration camp with 998 Jews on board.
- Died: Bess Houdini (stage name for Wilhelmina Rahner Weiss), 67, wife and stage assistant to magician Harry Houdini

== February 12, 1943 (Friday) ==
- In a nationwide radio address, U.S. President Roosevelt related the agreements made at the Casablanca Summit, and plans to win the war against the Axis powers. Roosevelt said, in a reference that the Cold War would prove to be true, that "the Axis propagandists are trying all of their old tricks in order ... to create the idea that if we win this war, Russia, England, China, and the United States are going to get into a cat-and-dog fight."
- In Niš, Serbia under German occupation, the first successful large-scale escape from a concentration camp happened in the Crveni Krst concentration camp (Red Cross Concentration Camp), when 105 prisoners escaped from the camp while 42 were killed trying to escape. In order to retaliate, the Nazis shot the remaining inmates of the camp.
- The German submarine U-442 was sunk in the Atlantic Ocean by a Lockheed Hudson of No. 48 Squadron RAF.
- William Morris, 1st Viscount Nuffield created the Nuffield Foundation, Britain's largest charitable trust, with a gift of £10 million.
- Forty Jews were shot in Tovste, Ukraine.

== February 13, 1943 (Saturday) ==
- Germany's 18th Army won a tactical victory in the Battle of Krasny Bor, slowing the momentum of the Soviet 55th Army, which lost more than 13,500 dead.
- Maliq Bushati was appointed as the Prime Minister of Albania by the Italian occupying authorities. He would be replaced after only three months; after the war, he would be executed for collaborating with the Axis.

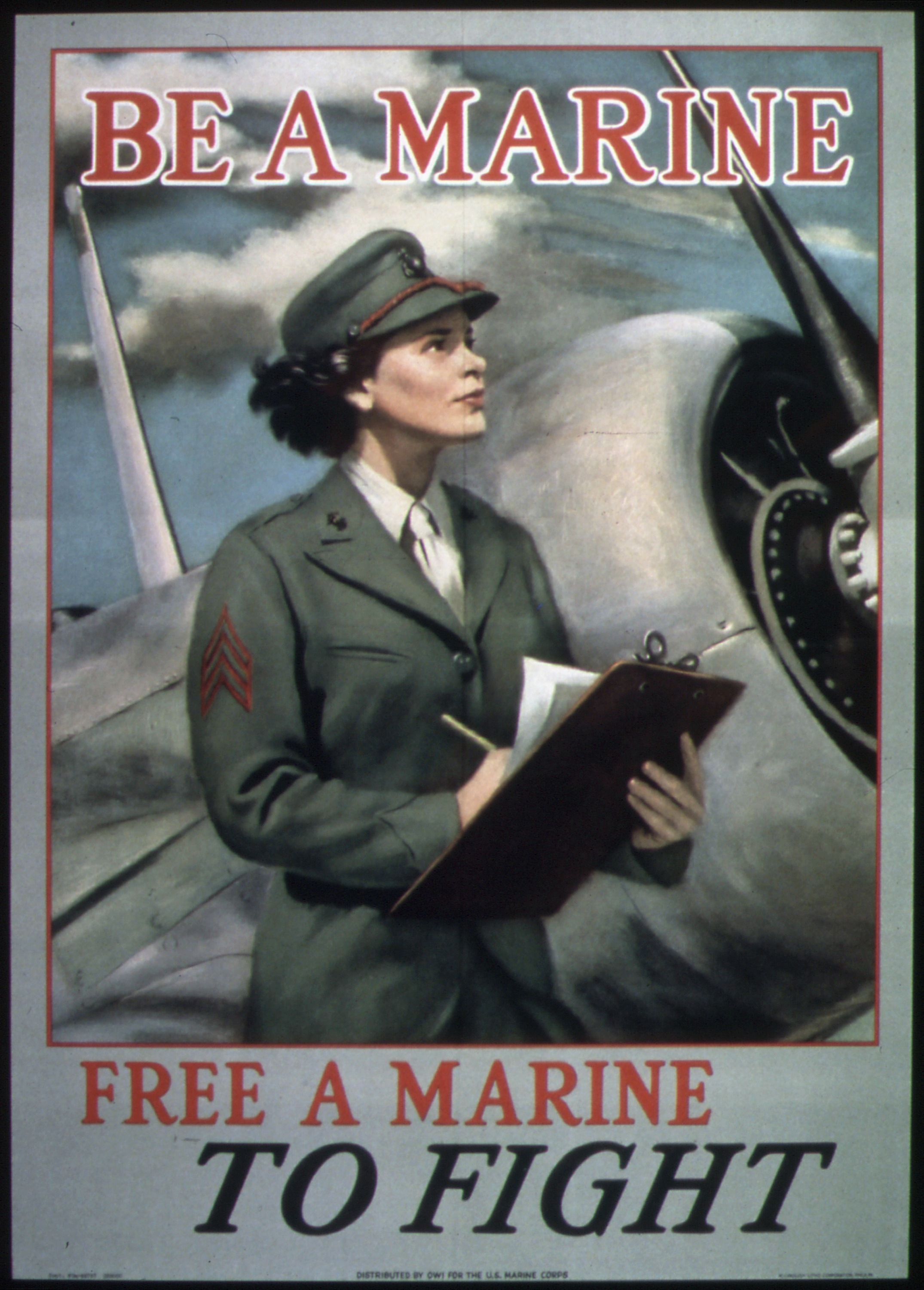
February 13, 1943: The U.S. Marines begin recruiting women

- The creation of the new United States Marine Corps Women's Reserve was announced, along with goals to recruit 1,000 officers and 18,000 enlisted women.
- The Del Monte Pre-Flight School was opened at Monterey, California, to train aviation cadets. During the eleven months of the college level school's existence, the former Hotel Del Monte luxury resort served as a military camp. The former hotel grounds now house the Naval Postgraduate School
- The Vought F4U Corsair was first used in combat, with the fast single engine fighters being used by the U.S. Navy and U.S. Marine Corps to fly missions from Guadalcanal. The Corsair planes "flew 64,051 combat missions" and "shot down 2,139 enemy aircraft" during the remaining two and a half years of World War II.
- The German submarine U-620 was sunk with its entire crew (of 44 or more men) in the Atlantic Ocean by a Royal Air Force Catalina of No. 202 Squadron RAF.
- "I Had the Craziest Dream" by Harry James and His Orchestra hit #1 on the Billboard singles chart.

== February 14, 1943 (Sunday) ==
- The Battle of Sidi Bou Zid began in Tunisia as German General Erwin Rommel and his Afrika Korps launched a surprise offensive against Allied defenses in Tunisia. This was part of a series of engagements which would culminate in the Battle of the Kasserine Pass several days later.
- The Priestly Society of the Holy Cross was founded by Father Josemaría Escrivá, later canonized as a Saint in the Roman Catholic Church and a founder of Opus Dei.
- Born: Maceo Parker, American saxophonist; in Kinston, North Carolina
- Died: David Hilbert, 81, leading German mathematician known for Hilbert's basis theorem, Hilbert space, and many other contributions.

== February 15, 1943 (Monday) ==
- The Battle of Demyansk began in Russia near Leningrad (now St. Petersburg) on the Eastern Front between the German 16th Army and the Soviet Army's Northwestern Front.<
- Uruguay was returned to democracy as the nation's Congress convened for the first time since President Alfredo Baldomir had replaced the legislature with a Council of State.
- The German submarine U-529 was sunk by a B-24 of No. 120 Squadron RAF.
- The Italian steamship Totonno, sailing from Bari to Dubrovnik and carrying flour and two Ansaldo tractors, struck a mine near Grebeni and sank; all crew survived.

== February 16, 1943 (Tuesday) ==
- Operation Gunnerside, a secret mission for the British Special Operations Executive (SOE), began as six Norwegian paratroopers led by Joachim Ronneburg were dropped into German-occupied Norway, near Skrykenvann. The location was 30 miles from the Norsk Hydro plant at Vemork, where the Germans were creating heavy water (deuterium oxide) as part of the early stages of a nuclear weapons program. Specially trained for demolition, the six agents carried plastic explosives, a shortwave radio, and skis, which they used to meet with an advance team and then to proceed to Vemork where they would carry out their mission on February 24.
- Heinrich Himmler, the Reichsführer of the Nazi SS, ordered that there were to be no further deportations of elderly Jews from the ghetto in Theresienstadt (now Terezín in the Czech Republic), which had been officially declared as a place where "the old could live and die in peace". For the next seven months, no Jews, of any age, in Theresienstadt were taken to concentration camps.
- After nine Italian soldiers were killed in an ambush by Greek Resistance fighters in Thessaly near the village of Domenikon, the Italians began the Domenikon massacre, rounding up 175 male civilians from Domenikon and the villages of Mesohori, Amouri and Damasi, and executing them over the next two days, shooting them in groups of seven.
- The American submarine Amberjack, carrying a crew of 113 U.S. Navy men, was depth charged and sunk off Rabaul by the Japanese ship Hiyodori.
- Mildred Harnack, a 41-year-old American citizen and Milwaukee native who was convicted of espionage against Germany, was executed by guillotine at the Plötzensee Prison, on the personal orders of Adolf Hitler.
- The final bombing of the city of Swansea in Wales, carried out by the German Luftwaffe, killed 34 civilians and injured 111 others. In 1941, German bombers had killed 230 residents of Swansea.
- Born: Akhteruzzaman Elias, Bengali language novelist; in Gotia, Gaibandha District, British India (now in Bangladesh) (d. 1997)
- Died: George Washington Buckner, 87, former African-American slave who served as U.S. Minister to Liberia from 1913 to 1915.

== February 17, 1943 (Wednesday) ==
- The German submarine U-69, which had sunk 17 merchant ships from Britain and other nations over a two-year period, was rammed and sunk by the British destroyer HMS Fame, along with its crew of at least 44 men. In its last kill, four months earlier on October 14, 1942, U-69 had torpedoed and sunk the Newfoundland civilian ferry SS Caribou, killing 137 men, women and children.
- Hitler flew to Field Marshal Erich von Manstein's headquarters in Zaporizhia with the intention of dismissing him over his suggestion to appoint an overall chief of staff, but soon became too engrossed in the crisis facing Army Group South when Manstein argued that it could not possibly defend the entire line. After two days of discussions, Hitler agreed to allow Manstein to draw troops from Army Group A and to launch a counterattack on his northern flank, which would result in the Third Battle of Kharkov.
- Russian pianist Sergei Rachmaninoff gave his last concert, performing in Knoxville, Tennessee, and then cancelled the remainder of his tour of American universities. Too ill to keep a February 22 date in New Orleans, Rachmaninoff, who had become an American citizen on February 1, returned to his Los Angeles home. He was diagnosed with melanoma, and the cancer had spread to his bone marrow, his liver and his lungs. Rachmaninoff would die on March 28.
- Germany's 5th Panzer Army forced the retreat of the U.S. Army II Corps (which had lost more than 2,500 men) in the Battle of Sidi Bou Zid in North Africa
- The German submarine U-201 was sunk by a British destroyer in the Atlantic Ocean, with all 49 aboard lost and U-205 was sunk in the Mediterranean by destroyer HMS Paladin. The crew of U-205 surfaced and had evacuated safely while Paladin salvaged secret documents and equipment from the sinking submarine.
- Alexander Mach, the Interior Minister of the Nazi-sponsored Slovak Republic, announced that deportation of the 15,000 remaining Jews, and an additional 10,000 who had converted to Christianity, would begin in March. Deportations had been halted for two years after payment of bribes to SS official Dieter Wisliceny.
- Major League Baseball star Joe DiMaggio, whose draft eligibility was deferred because of his 3A classification, enlisted in the United States Army. One biographer would note that "unlike fellow major leaguers Bob Feller, Cecil Travis, Warren Spahn and others, he never ventured anywhere near the battlefield" and spent the war playing baseball for the Seventh Army Air Force team.
- Died:
  - Wiktor Alter, 53, Polish labor activist, was executed in the Soviet Union on false charges of spying for Germany
  - George Keogan, 52, American college basketball coach and Hall of Fame inductee died of a heart attack, two days after the Fighting Irish team's 55 to 37 win over Canisius College in Buffalo, New York to increase the team's record to 12 wins and 1 loss.
  - William "Dinty" Colbeck, American gangster and former leader of the Egan's Rats in St. Louis, was shot to death in his car at the corner of Ninth and Destrehan streets in St. Louis.

== February 18, 1943 (Thursday) ==
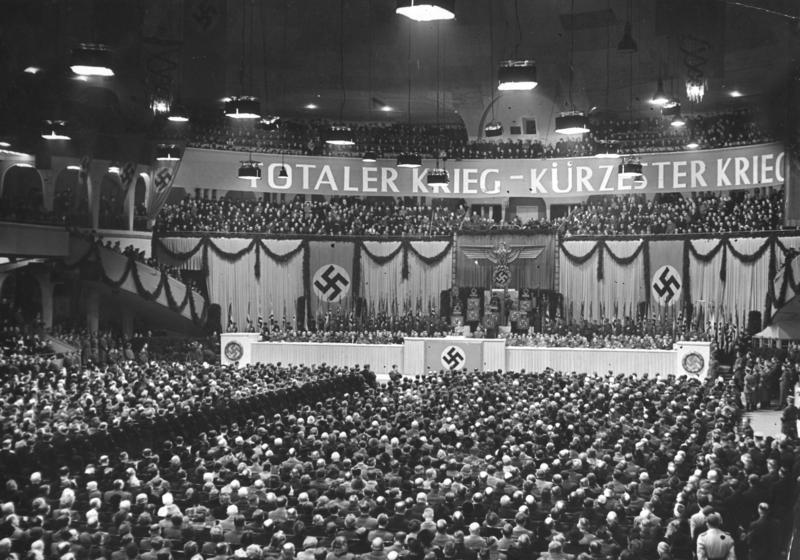
The Sportspalast rally banner: "Totaler Krieg — kürzester Krieg" ("Total War — Briefest War")

- In a speech at the Berlin Sportpalast and on nationwide radio, German Propaganda Minister Joseph Goebbels called on listeners to devote themselves to "Total War" (Der totale Krieg) against the Allied powers.
- Hans Scholl and Sophie Scholl, two students in the White Rose movement that was secretly distributing anti-Hitler literature, were captured at LMU Munich after a maintenance man saw them throwing leaflets from a campus building. After witnessing the act, Jakob Schmied detained the brother and sister, then called the Gestapo. Four days later, the Scholls, and another White Rose student, were tried, convicted and executed for treason.
- Soong Mei-ling, popularly known as "Madame Chiang Kai-shek" as the wife of China's president, became the first private citizen (and only the second woman) to address the U.S. Congress. Rather than speaking to a joint session, Madame Chiang gave a prepared speech to the Senate, and then an improvised speech to the House.
- U.S. President Roosevelt approved the extension of the Lend-Lease Program for the first American financial aid to the oil rich kingdom of Saudi Arabia, after being advised that geologists had concluded that the Saudi kingdom had the largest oil fields in the world.
- Groundbreaking took place for the secret nuclear production facilities at Oak Ridge, Tennessee.
- Under continued demands from Nazi Germany, the Japanese Empire followed the Nazi example of confining Jewish residents to a specific area, and set up the Shanghai ghetto, with a two square mile area in the Hongkou District to house 20,000 refugees from Germany, Austria and Poland. Over the next three months, the European Jews had been relocated to Hongkou, along with Chinese people whom Japan wanted to keep under surveillance.
- Born: Graeme Garden, Scottish writer, comedian, and actor; in Aberdeen

== February 19, 1943 (Friday) ==
- The Battle of Kasserine Pass, the first major engagement between U.S. and Axis forces in Africa, began in Tunisia and would last for five days. While Field Marshal Rommel of Germany's Afrika Korps gave the United States Army's first major tactical defeat of the war.
- The Third Battle of Kharkov began as German Field Marshal Erich von Manstein launched a counterstrike with more than 120,000 troops, using the German II SS Panzer Corps under SS-Gruppenführer Paul Hausser, attached to Army Group South in Ukraine, and the Soviet Central Front defended with 210,000 troops. The battle would last for 24 days until March 15 before a German triumph, with more than 50,000 deaths between the two sides.
- The German submarine U-268 was sunk in the Bay of Biscay by a Vickers Wellington of No. 172 Squadron RAF, while the U-562, which sank six British civilian ships, was sunk northeast of Benghazi off of the coast of Libya, with the loss of all 49 men. The sinking was done by a Vickers Wellington of No. 38 Squadron RAF in conjunction with British destroyers Hursley and Isis.
- The first "flight nurse" recruits, for the United States Army Nurse Corps, were certified after completing their training at Bowman Field in Louisville, Kentucky. The job of a flight nurse was to render aid to wounded soldiers being transported by the Air Evacuation Units of the U.S. Army Air Force.
- Freeman Gosden and Charles Correll broadcast the final episode of their popular NBC Blue Network radio program, the original Amos 'n' Andy. In the original format, the two white comedians voiced African-American dialect not only for the title characters, but for most of the other roles as well. The new version would debut in the fall, with a live audience, and Gosden and Correll joined by a cast of African-American supporting actors.
- Born:
  - Tim Hunt, British biochemist, 2001 Nobel Prize laureate; in Neston, Cheshire
  - Homer Hickam, American author of Rocket Boys (adapted to film with the anagram October Sky) and retired NASA engineer; in Coalwood, West Virginia
  - Lou Christie (stage name for Lugee Sacco), American singer known for the hit song "Lightnin' Strikes"; in Glenwillard, Pennsylvania

== February 20, 1943 (Saturday) ==
- At 4:30 pm local time, the Mexican volcano Parícutin broke the surface of a cornfield owned by farmer Dionisio Pulido, and began increasing in size through ash, stone and rock. By the next morning, the volcanic mound was already 30 feet high. At the end of the week, Parícutin — named for a nearby village in the state of Michoacán — had reached 400 feet and was sending material half a mile into the sky. Within a year, after the Parícutin village was evacuated, the volcano was 1,100 feet tall and would peak at 2,000 feet. After nine years and five days of smoke and lava flows, Parícutin would suddenly cease on February 25, 1952.
- The Japanese destroyer Ōshio was torpedoed off Wewak, New Guinea by American submarine Albacore and sank under tow.
- Born:
  - Mike Leigh, British film director; in Welwyn Garden City, Hertfordshire
  - Antonio Inoki, Japanese professional wrestler; as Kanji Inoki in Yokohama (d. 2022)

== February 21, 1943 (Sunday) ==
- In Operation Cleanslate, having secured Guadalcanal, American forces of the 43rd Infantry Division (some 10,000 men) invaded the Russell Islands, with the 103rd and 169th regiments, and members of the 11th Defense Battalion, landing on Mbanika Island, and the 3rd Marine Raider Battalion coming ashore on Pavuvu. Although a fierce battle had been expected, the Japanese defenders had already been withdrawn and the islands were taken by the U.S. without a fight.
- The German submarine U-623 was depth charged and sunk in the Atlantic Ocean by a B-24 of No. 120 Squadron RAF, with the loss of all hands.
- A nationwide day of prayer was held in India for Mahatma Gandhi, whose fasting was putting his life in danger.
- Born: David Geffen, American record executive and film producer; in Brooklyn

== February 22, 1943 (Monday) ==
- Guards at the Featherston prisoner of war camp in New Zealand, housing 240 Japanese POWs, fired shots when an uprising began and a crowd of prisoners began throwing rocks and charging at them. With a 30-second burst of machine gun fire, the guards shot and killed 48 Japanese POWs, of whom 31 died at the scene and 17 died later, and another 74 prisoners were wounded. One bullet ricocheted and killed New Zealand Army Private Walter Pelvin.
- The first three student members of the White Rose resistance group were executed by the Nazi government at the Stadelheim Prison near Munich. Christoph Probst, 23; Hans Scholl, 24; and his sister Sophie Scholl, 21, were all beheaded by guillotine, four days after their arrest for distributing anti-war leaflets at LMU Munich. The article in the Munich newspaper Neueste Nachrichten later that day reported that "the condemned persons shamelessly committed offenses against the armed security of the nation and the will to fight of the German people by defacing houses with slogans attacking the state, and by distributing treasonous leaflets".
- Alexander Belev, the Bulgarian Minister of Jewish Affairs, signed an agreement with Gestapo representative Theodor Dannecker to deliver 20,000 Bulgarian Jews to German labor camps. From the recently annexed territories of Western Thrace (Bati Trakya) and Macedonia (Makedoniya), Belev would oversee the removal of 23,000 Jews to Treblinka extermination camp and Auschwitz. Arrangements would be made for another 8,555 to be deported from the Kingdom of Bulgaria, a move which was successfully resisted by the Kingdom's parliament.
- Pan American World Airways Flight 9035, flying from New York City to Lisbon, crashed while attempting to land. Twenty-five of the 39 people on board were killed, most of them on tour for the USO to entertain American troops in Europe, were killed when the Boeing 314A seaplane, nicknamed the "Yankee Clipper", went down into the Tagus River. Jane Froman was one of the fifteen seriously injured survivors.
- The German submarines U-225 and U-606 were both sunk in the Atlantic Ocean by Allied warships. U-225 went down with all 46 crew while 12 of the 48 crew of U-606 were rescued.
- The Canadian corvette HMCS Weyburn sank east of Gibraltar after striking a mine.
- Born: Eduard Limonov, Russian activist who founded the National Bolshevik Party after the fall of the Soviet Union; in Dzerzhinsk (d. 2020)
- Died: Alfred Nossig, 78, Polish sculptor and German sympathizer suspected of supplying reports to Germany about Jewish residents of the Warsaw Ghetto, was shot to death by orders of the underground Jewish resistance group, the ZOB.

== February 23, 1943 (Tuesday) ==
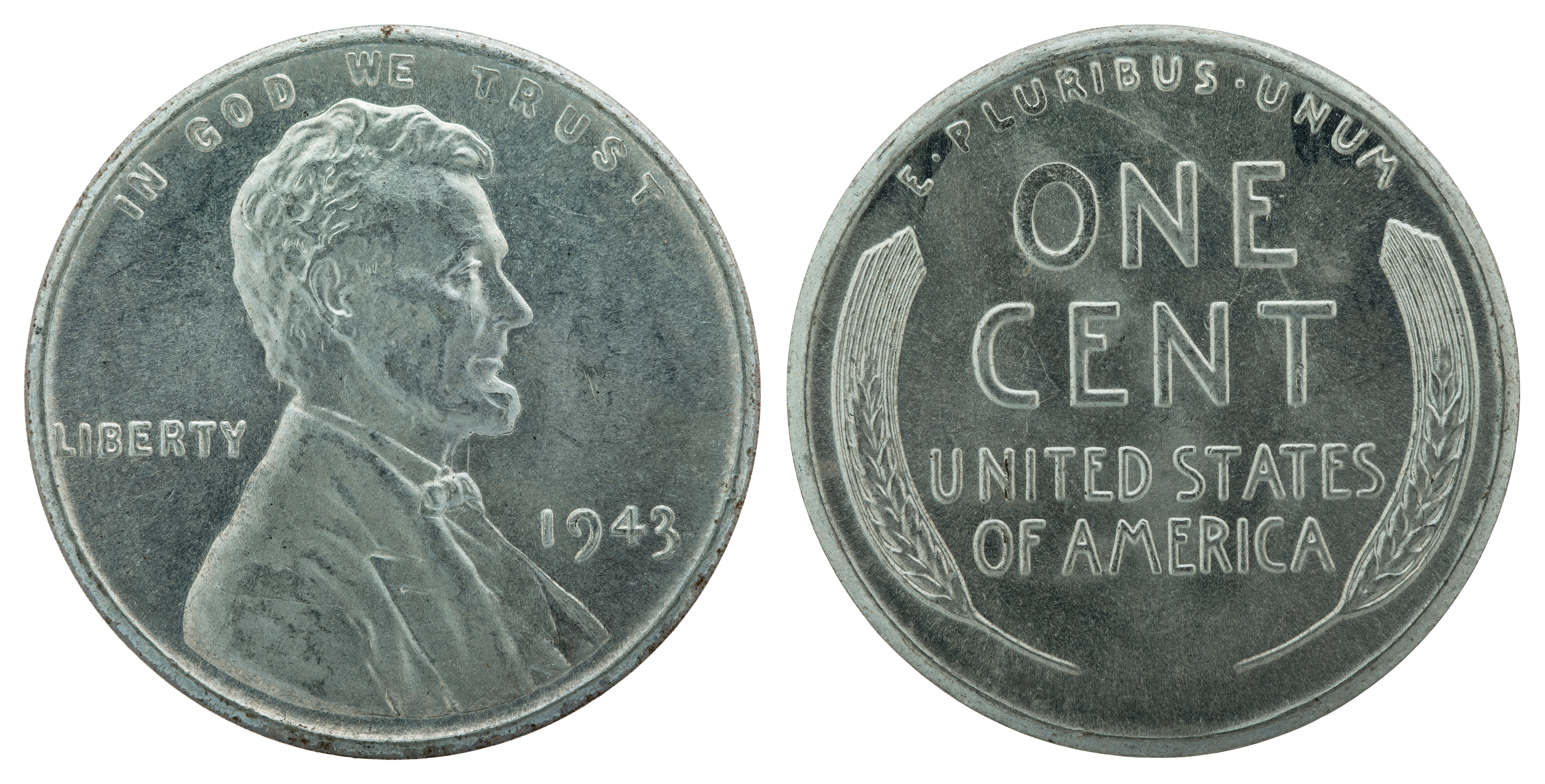
The 1943 steel penny

- The first "steel pennies" were manufactured in the United States. Because of the need for copper to be used for the war effort, the one cent piece was made of steel with a thin zinc plating to prevent rust. After being put into circulation on February 27, the new pennies were mistaken for dimes, and were not accepted in machines that had magnets to catch slugs. The unpopular coins were discontinued at the end of the year.
- The German submarine U-443 was depth charged and sunk off Algiers by British destroyers with the loss of all hands, and the U-522 was depth charged and sunk in the Atlantic Ocean by British cutter Totland with the loss of all 51 crew.
- Born: Fred Biletnikoff, American NFL player and Hall of Fame inductee; in Erie, Pennsylvania
- Died:
  - Lt. Gen. Grigory Kravchenko, 30, fighter ace and twice Hero of the Soviet Union, was killed after his airplane was shot down and his parachute failed.
  - Soviet Major General M.M. Shaimuratov), 43, died after being captured, tortured and blinded by German Army interrogators.

== February 24, 1943 (Wednesday) ==
- Germany's Afrika Corps withdrew from its attack United States Army's Second Corps, ending the Battle of Kasserine Pass. The U.S. Army Second Corps had 3,300 men of the killed or wounded, and 3,000 taken prisoner, the Allies (with the British Army's 6th Armoured Division and losing more than 2,000 casualties and the French forces more than 500, were eventually successful in preventing Rommel from attaining his overall strategic objective of Tebessa. The German 5th Panzer Army and the Italian Centauro Division had 989 casualties.
- An early morning fire at a girl's orphanage in the city of Cavan in Ireland, killed 35 girls between the ages of 4 and 14, and an 87-year-old caretaker. A subsequent inquiry absolved the Poor Clares of blame.
- The new British submarine HMS Vandal disappeared during sea trials, along with its crew of 37, only four days after it had been commissioned. After departing Lochranza on the Scottish Isle of Arran, the Vandal submerged and never resurfaced. The submarine would remain missing for more than half a century until its rediscovery on June 26, 1994.
- The German submarine U-649 sank in the Baltic Sea after a collision with U-232. Of the 46 crew on U-649, 11 survived.Busch, Rainer; Röll, Hans-Joachim (1999). German U-boat commanders of World War II : a biographical dictionary. Translated by Brooks, Geoffrey. London, Annapolis, Md: Greenhill Books, Naval Institute Press. p. 80. ISBN 1-55750-186-6.
- The first major protest march in Athens began after rumours that there would be forced mobilization of Greek workers for work in Germany, resulting in clashes with the Axis occupation forces and collaborationist police. Demonstrators attacked the Labour Ministry and burned its files.

== February 25, 1943 (Thursday) ==
- The Allies started their new strategy of "round-the-clock bombing" as USAAF planes bombed Germany in the daytime while the RAF struck at night. Over the next two days, over 2,000 sorties would strike German targets.
- The Latvian SS Volunteer Division was formed, with three infantry regiments in Latvia fighting on the side of Germany in hopes of winning back independence from the Soviet Union.
- Born: George Harrison, British musician for The Beatles; in Liverpool (d. 2001)

== February 26, 1943 (Friday) ==
- The Zigeunerlager, a section of the Auschwitz concentration camp that was intended to segregate Gypsy families from other minorities marked for extermination, received its first group of deportees. In three successive actions, the 5,100 residents were murdered, beginning with the elimination of 1,700 on March 22.
- Germany successfully completed Operation Hornung in the Byelorussian SSR (now Belarus), and launched Operation Ochsenkopf, a new offensive, in Tunisia.
- Born:
  - Bill Duke, American actor and director; in Poughkeepsie, New York
  - Darcus Howe, British civil rights activist; as Leighton Rhett Radford Howe, in Moruga, Trinidad (d. 2017)
- Died: Nazi SS Obergruppenführer Theodor Eicke, 50, after being shot down over Kharkov

== February 27, 1943 (Saturday) ==
- An explosion, and carbon monoxide poisoning, killed 74 of the 77 men working inside the Smith Mine #3, near Bearcreek, Montana.
- The Fabrikaktion took place in Berlin and other large cities as orders went out to arrest the remaining Jews in Germany.

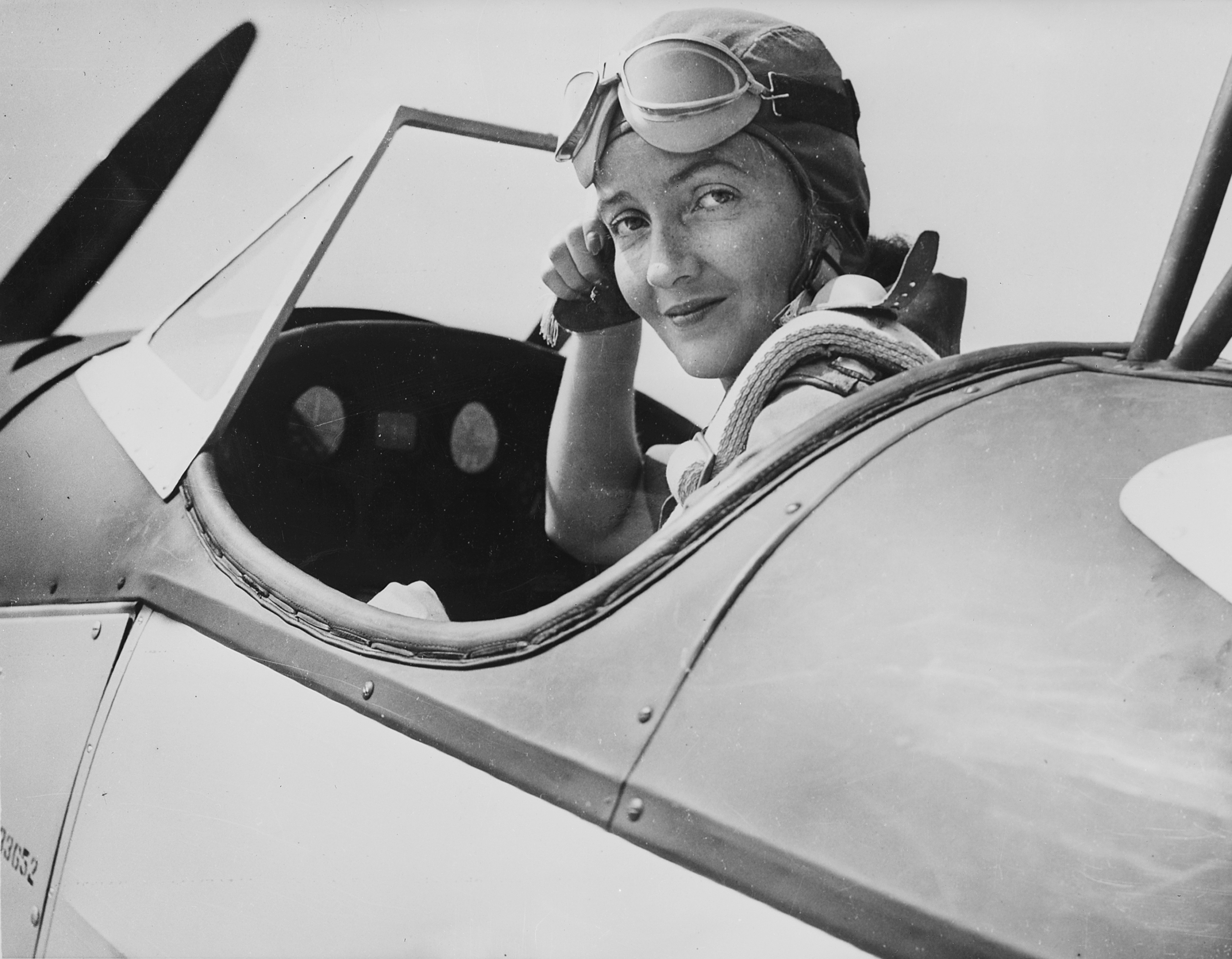
Pilot Nancy Harkness Love

- Nancy Harkness Love, one of 29 pilots in the Women's Auxiliary Ferrying Squadron, became the first woman to be certified to fly a P-51 Mustang pursuit plane, and would later be the first woman cleared to fly several other military aircraft.
- The British submarine Tigris was lost in the Mediterranean Sea with all 59 crew. Its loss was not discovered by the Royal Navy until March 10, when it failed to arrive at Algiers, and the Navy concluded that Tigris had probably sunk by the German submarine chaser Uj-2210.
- British Commandos carried out Operation Huckaback, an overnight raid on Herm in the Channel Islands. The raid found no German forces on the island.
- Born:
  - Moshe Cotel, American composer and pianist; in Baltimore (d. 2008)
  - Morten Lauridsen, American composer; in Colfax, Washington

== February 28, 1943 (Sunday) ==
- In Operation Gunnerside, the Norsk Hydro plant at Vermok in Norway, being used by the Nazi German nuclear research program, was successfully sabotaged by Norwegian SOE commandos. The team used skis to reach the plant, entered through a service tunnel, and placed timed explosive charges on the tanks of heavy water and the electrolysis chambers needed to produce the deuterium oxide liquid, and escaped. The blasts destroyed the entire inventory of the heavy water that had been produced by the Germans.
- A 1,000 bomber RAF and U.S. Army Air Force bombing raid against Saint-Nazaire dropped 4.5 million pounds of explosive and incendiary bombs on the German U-boat bases in Nazi occupied France, and killed 479 people.
- The Battle of Demyansk ended in Russia with the Soviet Union having halted Germany's Demyansk Offensive after the Germans withdrew their 16th Army. The Soviets had more than 10,000 troops dead or missing, while the Germans lost more 1,718.
- In Athens, the funeral of Greece's national poet, Kostis Palamas, turned into a demonstration against the Axis occupation of Greece.
