= Constantine Harbor =

Inlet on the island of Amchitka, Alaska

Coordinates: 51°24′11″N 179°17′49″E

Constantine Harbor is an inlet on the eastern end of the north coast of the island of Amchitka in the Aleutian Islands in Alaska. It is near the site of an abandoned military airstrip.
