= Davydawka, Svyetlahorsk district, Gomel region =

Village in Gomel Region, Belarus

Davydawka Давыдаўка (Belarusian) Давыдовка (Russian) Davydovka
- Village
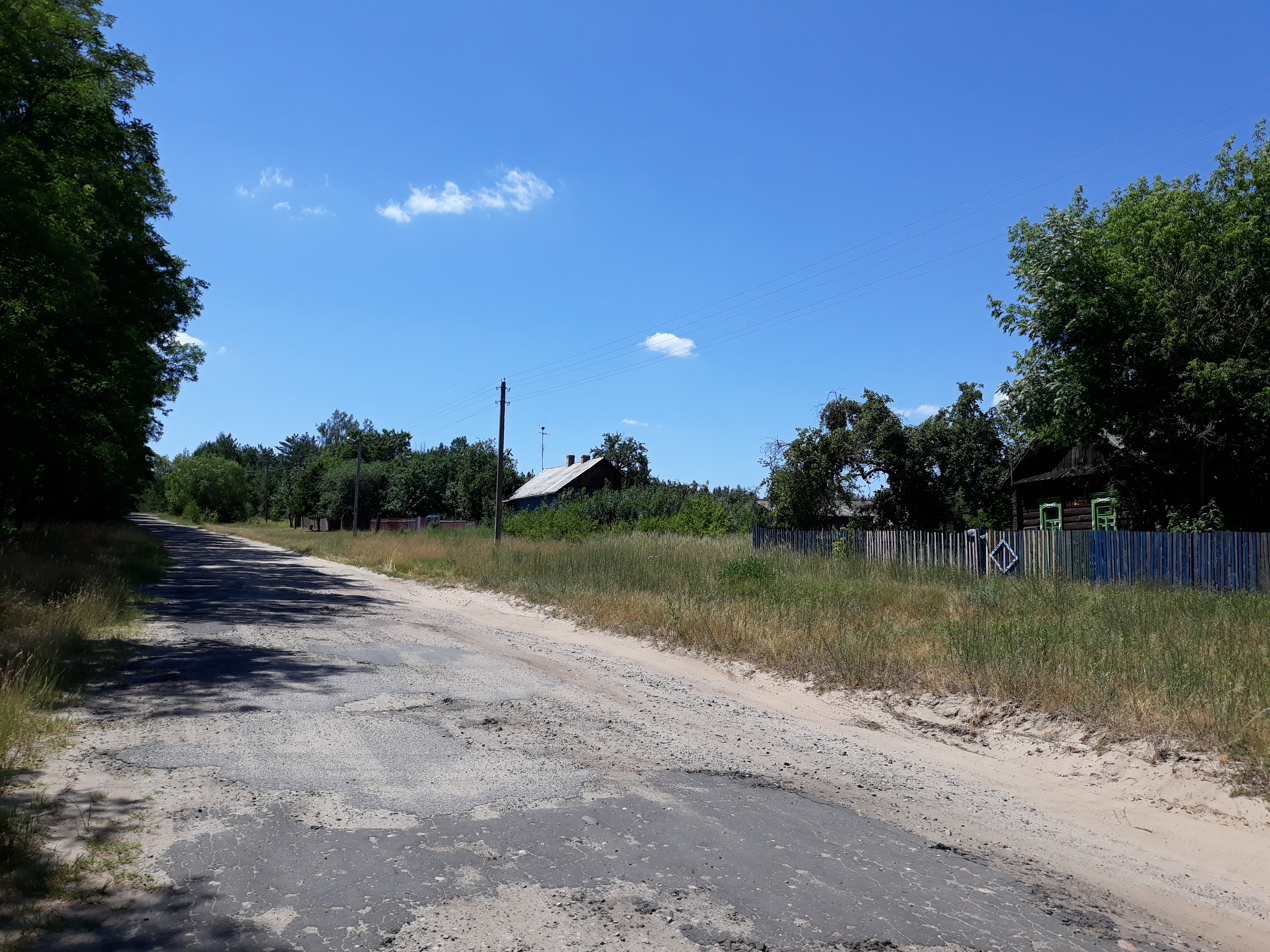

- Location within Belarus
- Coordinates: 52°32′24″N 29°31′45″E
- Country: Belarus
- Region: Gomel Region
- District: Svyetlahorsk District
- Time zone: UTC+3 (MSK)

Davydawka or Davydovka (Belarusian: Давы́даўка, romanized: Davydaŭka; Russian: Давы́довка; Yiddish: דאַווידאָווקע) is a village in Svyetlahorsk District, Gomel Region, Belarus. It is part of Davydawka selsoviet. It was founded as a Jewish farming settlement. During World War II it was the place of a large concentration camp controlled by the hungarian army.
