= Davidovka concentration camp =

Davidovka concentration camp was a Hungarian-controlled World War II labor camp in Davidovka, in Reichskommissariat Ukraine.

== See also ==
- People who died in Davidovka concentration camp
