= List of shipwrecks in June 1944 =

The list of shipwrecks in June 1944 includes ships sunk, foundered, grounded, or otherwise lost during June 1944.

== 1 June ==
List of shipwrecks: 1 June 1944
| Ship | State | Description |
|---|---|---|
| Hans Leonhardt | Germany | World War II: The cargo ship was bombed and sunk off Stad, Norway by Fairey Barracuda aircraft based on HMS Furious and HMS Victorious (both Royal Navy). |
| USS Herring | United States Navy | World War II: The Gato-class submarine was shelled and sunk off Matsuwa, Kuril Islands (48°00′N 153°00′E) by Japanese shore-based artillery of the Matsuwa Detachment of the Imperial Japanese Army's Guards Division 52 with the loss of all 60 crew. |
| Hiburi Maru | Japan | World War II: The cargo ship was torpedoed and sunk in Yawata Bay, Matsuwa Island, Kuriles by USS Herring ( United States Navy). Thirty-three crewmen and 97 soldiers were killed. |
| Iwaki Maru | Imperial Japanese Army | World War II: The Tenko Maru-class auxiliary transport ship was torpedoed and sunk in Yawata Bay, Matsuwa Island, Kuriles by USS Herring ( United States Navy). Thirty crewmen and 20 soldiers were killed. |
| Mali Ante | Yugoslav Partisans | World War II: Convoy: The transport was sunk by S 153, S 155, S 156, and S 158 (all Kriegsmarine). Between the three ships 77 partisans, 2 British advisors, 50 women and 24 children were taken prisoner. |
| R-211 | Kriegsmarine | World War II: The Type R-151 minesweeper was bombed and sunk by British aircraft in the Mediterranean Sea north of Crete. |
| Sabine | Germany | World War II: The cargo ship was bombed and sunk off Crete, Greece by British aircraft. |
| USS Shahaka | United States Navy | The large harbor tug collided in the Pacific Ocean (27°21′N 136°29′W) with floating dock ABSD-2 and sank . |
| Sperrbrecher 181 Atlas | Kriegsmarine | World War II: The Sperrbrecher (1,747 GRT) was badly damaged off Stad by Fairey Barracuda aircraft based on HMS Furious and HMS Victorious (both Royal Navy) and was beached, burning for two days. 28 crew were killed. She was raised and repaired in 1946. |
| Toho Maru | Japan | World War II: The transport ship was torpedoed and sunk in the Pacific Ocean off the Mandate Islands by USS Pintado ( United States Navy). |
| UJ-2101 | Kriegsmarine | World War II: The submarine chaser, a former Aliakon-class minelayer, was bombed and sunk in the Mediterranean Sea north of Crete by Martin Baltimore, Bristol Beaufighter and Martin Marauder aircraft of the Royal Air Force with the loss of 12 lives. |
| UJ-2105 | Kriegsmarine | World War II: The submarine chaser was bombed and sunk in the Mediterranean Sea north of Crete by Martin Baltimore, Bristol Beaufighter and Martin B-26 Marauder aircraft of the Royal Air Force with the loss of two lives. |
| Unknown transports | Yugoslav Partisans | World War II: Convoy: The two transports were sunk by S 153, S 155, S 156, and S 158 (all Kriegsmarine). |

== 2 June ==
List of shipwrecks: 2 June 1944
| Ship | State | Description |
|---|---|---|
| Awaji | Imperial Japanese Navy | World War II: Convoy HI-65: The Mikura-class escort ship was torpedoed and sunk in the Bashi Straits off Yashu Island (22°34′N 121°51′E) by USS Picuda ( United States Navy). Seventy-six crewmen were killed. |
| Chiyo Maru | Japan | World War II: The cargo ship was torpedoed and sunk in the Pacific Ocean off the Mariana Islands by USS Shark ( United States Navy) with the loss of 5 crewmen and 97 passengers. |
| Gertrud | Germany | World War II: The cargo ship was bombed, blew up and sank during an air raid by British aircraft at Heraklion, Crete (35°20′N 25°10′E). |
| R 212 | Kriegsmarine | World War II: The minesweeper was attacked in the Mediterranean Sea off Vada, Italy by Allied aircraft and was beached. |
| RD 110 | Kriegsmarine | World War II: The minesweeper was attacked in the Mediterranean sea off Vada by Allied aircraft and was beached. |
| Rüstersiel | Germany | World War II: The tug struck a mine and sank in the North Sea off Föhr, Schleswig-Holstein. |
| SG 11 | Kriegsmarine | World War II: The escort ship / auxiliary minelayer was torpedoed and sunk off Port Vendres, Basses-Pyrénées, France (42°30′N 3°07′E) by HMS Ultor (Royal Navy). Ten crew were killed. |
| TA16 | Kriegsmarine | World War II: The torpedo boat, formerly of the Curtatone class, was sunk by the explosion of Gertrud (Germany) during an air raid by British aircraft at Heraklion (35°20′N 25°10′E). |
| Unnamed | Soviet Union | World War II: The fishing vessel was shelled and sunk by U-23 (Kriegsmarine) in the Black Sea. |
| V 1810 Condor | Kriegsmarine | World War II: The Vorpostenboot was bombed and sunk in the English Channel off Boulogne, Pas-de-Calais, France. |
| V 2004 Elmshorn | Kriegsmarine | World War II: The Einswarden-class naval trawler/Vorpostenboot was sunk in the North Sea off IJmuiden, North Holland, Netherlands by a motor torpedo boat, or a mine off the Hook of Holland. Salvaged and towed to Rotterdam, repairs incomplete before area was liberated. |
| Victoria Maru | Japan | World War II: The cargo ship was sunk on this date. |

== 3 June ==
List of shipwrecks: 3 June 1944
| Ship | State | Description |
|---|---|---|
| AF 58 | Kriegsmarine | World War II: The A type Artilleriefährprahm was bombed and sunk in the English Channel off Boulogne, Pas-de-Calais, France. |
| Ashizuri | Imperial Japanese Navy | World War II: The tanker was torpedoed and sunk in the Pacific Ocean off Tawi-Tawi by USS Puffer ( United States Navy). |
| M 4003 Kerolay | Kriegsmarine | World War II: The Augustenburg-class minesweepering naval trawler struck a mine and sank in the Bay of Biscay off Brest, Finistère, France. There were no casualties. |
| Takasaki | Imperial Japanese Navy | World War II: The tanker was torpedoed and sunk in the Pacific Ocean off Tawi-Tawi by USS Puffer ( United States Navy). |
| U-477 | Kriegsmarine | World War II: The Type VIIC submarine was depth charged and sunk in the Norwegian Sea west of Trondheim, Norway (63°59′N 1°37′E) by a Consolidated PBY Catalina aircraft of 162 Squadron, Royal Canadian Air Force with the loss of all 51 crew. |
| WBS 2 Coburg | Kriegsmarine | The weather ship was set afire and abandoned in ice off the east coast of Greenland. |

== 4 June ==
List of shipwrecks: 4 June 1944
| Ship | State | Description |
|---|---|---|
| Clearpool | United Kingdom | The cargo ship ran aground on the Skitter Sand, in the Humber. She broke her back and was a total loss. |
| Gongen Maru | Imperial Japanese Navy | World War II: The patrol boat was bombed and sunk in the Pacific Ocean north west of New Guinea by Douglas A-20 Havoc and Martin B-26 Marauder aircraft of the United States Army Air Force. |
| Hakusan Maru | Imperial Japanese Navy | World War II: The Hakone Maru-class auxiliary transport (10,380 GRT 1923) was torpedoed and sunk in the Pacific Ocean south west of Iwo Jima (22°37′N 136°50′E) by USS Flier ( United States Navy). 23 crewmen, 9 gunners, and 16 military, and 277 civilian passengers (mostly women and children), were killed. |
| Hakusan Maru No. 2 | Imperial Japanese Navy | World War II: The submarine chaser was bombed and sunk in the Pacific Ocean north west of New Guinea by Douglas A-20 Havoc and Martin B-25 Marauder aircraft of the United States Army Air Force. |
| Katsukawa Maru | Imperial Japanese Army | World War II: Convoy No. 3530: The transport was torpedoed and sunk in the Pacific Ocean (19°45′N 138°15′E) off the Mariana Islands by USS Shark ( United States Navy). 28 troops, or half of the 2,884 troops of the IJA 43rd Infantry Division on board, 10 guards and 77 crewmen were killed. |
| HMS LCT 2498 | Royal Navy | The landing craft tank (134/286 t, 1942) foundered in the English Channel. All aboard were rescued by USS Barton and USS Bannock ( United States Navy). |
| Nippo Maru No. 5 | Imperial Japanese Army | World War II: The tanker was bombed and sunk in the Pacific Ocean north west of New Guinea by Douglas A-20 Havoc and Martin B-25 Marauder aircraft of the United States Army Air Force. |
| Olga | Canada | The Canadian tour boat capsized and sank after a wave struck the boat after the motor failed in Lake Erie near Port Stanley killing 17 people. 16 others were rescued. |
| Shimane Maru | Imperial Japanese Navy | World War II: The patrol boat was bombed and sunk in the Pacific Ocean north west of New Guinea by Douglas A-20 Havoc and Martin B-25 Marauder aircraft of the United States Army Air Force. |
| Shinko Maru No. 6 | Imperial Japanese Navy | World War II: The guard ship was torpedoed and sunk in the Pacific Ocean, probably by USS Golet ( United States Navy). |
| T-128 | Imperial Japanese Navy | World War II: The No.101-class landing ship was bombed and sunk in the Pacific Ocean 110 miles (180 km) north east of Molokai Island, Halmahera, near Tofubei Island (04°09′N 129°45′E) by United States Army Air Force B-24 Liberator aircraft. |
| Tokyo Maru No. 3 | Imperial Japanese Navy | World War II: The patrol boat was bombed and sunk in the Pacific Ocean north west of New Guinea by Douglas A-20 Havoc and Martin B-25 Marauder aircraft of the United States Army Air Force. |
| V 72 St Dominique | Kriegsmarine | World War II: The 138.5-foot (42.2 m), 341-ton Vorpostenboot struck a mine and sank in the Bay of Biscay off Brest, Finistère, France. |

== 5 June ==
List of shipwrecks: 5 June 1944
| Ship | State | Description |
|---|---|---|
| Ashizuri | Imperial Japanese Navy | World War II: The tanker was torpedoed and sunk in the Sulu Sea at the north end of the Sibutu Passage off Tawi-Tawi, Philippines by USS Puffer ( United States Navy). |
| CHANT 63 | United Kingdom | The Channel tanker (401 GRT, 1944) capsized and sank in the North Sea off Flamborough Head, Yorkshire. She was on a voyage from Middlesbrough, Yorkshire to Portsmouth, Hampshire. |
| F 611 | Kriegsmarine | World War II: The Type C2 Marinefahrprahm was sunk by Allied fighter-bomber aircraft off La Spezia, Italy. There were no casualties. |
| Helen Moller | United Kingdom | World War II: The cargo ship (5,259 GRT, 1918) was torpedoed and sunk in the Indian Ocean 300 nautical miles (560 km) south south east of Addu Atoll, Maldives (4°28′S 74°45′E) by U-183 (Kriegsmarine) with the loss of four of her 73 crew. Survivors were rescued by Empire Confidence ( United Kingdom) and HMS Okapi (Royal Navy). |
| Julius Madsen | Denmark | World War II: The cargo ship struck a mine and sank in the Baltic Sea north of the Darßer Ort Lighthouse. |
| USS LCT-428 | United States Navy | The LCT Mk 5-class landing craft tank was lost in the English Channel. |
| M-37 | Kriegsmarine | World War II: The M-class minesweeper was torpedoed and sunk in the Gulf of Finland, off Voka, Estonia, by TKA-15, TKA-45 and TKA-65 (all Soviet Navy). 14 crew were killed, 11 wounded. |
| USS Osprey | United States Navy | World War II: The Raven-class minesweeper struck a mine and sank in the English Channel (50°12′N 1°20′W) with the loss of six men. |
| PiLB 412 | Kriegsmarine | World War II: The PiLB 40 Type landing craft was sunk by Allied fighter-bomber aircraft near Solta island. |
| Pillory | Panama | World War II: The ex Danish cargo ship Jonna, seized, operated under Panamanian flag for the War Shipping Administration with registry and name changed on 31 March 1942 to Pillory (U.S.) was torpedoed and sunk in the Atlantic Ocean off Puerto Rico (18°25′N 67°17′W) by U-539 (Kriegsmarine) with the loss of 25 of her 47 crew. Survivors were rescued by USCGC Crawford and USCGC CG-83310 (both United States Coast Guard). |
| Takasaki | Imperial Japanese Navy | World War II: The tanker was torpedoed and sunk in the Sulu Sea at the north end of the Sibutu Passage off Tawi-Tawi, Philippines by USS Puffer ( United States Navy). |
| Takaoka Maru | Imperial Japanese Army | World War II: Convoy No. 3530: The Lyons Maru-class transport was torpedoed and sunk in the Pacific Ocean off the Mariana Islands (18°40′N 140°35′E) by USS Shark ( United States Navy). 115 troops and 29 crew were killed. |
| Tamahime Maru | Imperial Japanese Navy | World War II: Convoy No. 3530: The requisitioned cargo ship was torpedoed and sunk in the Pacific Ocean off the Mariana Islands (18°40′N 140°35′E) by USS Shark ( United States Navy). 52 crew were killed. |
| TK-46 | Soviet Navy | World War II: The G-5-class motor torpedo boat was shelled and sunk in the Gulf of Finland, off Voka, Estonia by German minesweepers. Two crewmen were killed, eight survivors were made prisoners of war. |
| V 622 Almuth | Kriegsmarine | World War II: The Vorpostenboot struck a mine and sank in the Bay of Biscay off Saint-Nazaire, Loire-Inférieure, France. |

== 6 June ==
List of shipwrecks: 6 June 1944
| Ship | State | Description |
|---|---|---|
| AF 62 | Kriegsmarine | World War II: The Artilleriefährprahm was scuttled at Isigny-sur-Mer or Port-en-Bessin, Calvados, France. |
| AF 64 | Kriegsmarine | World War II: The Artilleriefährprahm was scuttled at Isigny-sur-Mer or Port-en-Bessin. |
| AF 67 | Kriegsmarine | World War II: The Artilleriefährprahm was scuttled at Isigny-sur-Mer or Port-en-Bessin. |
| AF 72 | Kriegsmarine | World War II: The Artilleriefährprahm was scuttled at Isigny-sur-Mer or Port-en-Bessin. |
| CD-15 | Imperial Japanese Navy | World War II: Convoy HO-02: The Type C escort ship was torpedoed and sunk in the South China Sea 160 nautical miles (300 km) off Cape St. Jacques, French Indochina, south of Nishinotorishima (08°57′N 109°17′E) by USS Raton (United States Navy). 104 crewmen, including the captain, were killed, 34 survivors were rescued by CD-8 and CD-20 (both Imperial Japanese Navy). |
| USS Corry | United States Navy | World War II: Operation Overlord: The Gleaves-class destroyer was shelled and sunk off Utah Beach, Normandy (49°30′50″N 1°11′30″W) by German shore-based artillery with the loss of 24 of her 276 crew. Survivors were rescued by USS Butler, USS Fitch, USS Hobson and USS PT-199 (all United States Navy). |
| Havre Maru | Imperial Japanese Army | World War II: Convoy no. 3530: The Hague Maru-class auxiliary transport was torpedoed and sunk in the Pacific Ocean 200 nautical miles (370 km) north west of Saipan (16°28′N 142°16′E) by USS Pintado (United States Navy). Seven out of the 2,816 troops aboard and 91 crewmen were killed. Her captain, the rest of the crew and surviving troops were rescued and taken to Saipan, where they were killed fighting as infantry during the Battle of Saipan. |
| Kashimasan Maru | Imperial Japanese Navy | World War II: Convoy No. 3530: The requisitioned cargo ship was torpedoed and sunk in the Pacific Ocean off the Mandate Islands (16°28′N 142°16′E) by USS Pintado (United States Navy). 43 of the crew were killed. An unknown number of landing craft were lost as cargo. |
| USS LC (FF)-31 | United States Navy | World War II: Operation Overlord: The landing craft, flotilla flagship was shelled and damaged in the English Channel off Normandy. She was declared a total loss. |
| USS LCI(L)-85 | United States Navy | World War II: Operation Overlord: The landing craft infantry (large) struck a mine and then was shelled by 88 mm (3 in) shore guns, with 15 soldiers killed and 30 wounded and 4 crew wounded. She capsized 10 miles (16 km) off Normandy, and was scuttled by demolition charge in 14 fathoms (84 ft; 26 m) of water in the English Channel. The crew were rescued by a United States Navy tugboat. |
| USS LCI(L)-91 | United States Navy | World War II: Operation Overlord: The landing craft infantry (large) struck a mine approaching Omaha Beach. The mine sat her afire and she drifted ashore, damaged beyond repair. Five crewmen were killed. The wreck was scrapped in place in the late 1940s or early 1950s. |
| USS LCI(L)-92 | United States Navy | World War II: Operation Overlord: The landing craft infantry (large) was shelled, burned, and abandoned off Normandy, eventually drifting ashore on Omaha Beach. The wreck was scrapped in place in the late 1940s or early 1950s. |
| USS LCI(L)-93 | United States Navy | USS LCI(L)-93 beached and abandoned World War II: Operation Overlord: The landing craft infantry (large) was holed by a submerged object, then shelled, beached, and abandoned off Normandy. |
| HMS LCI(L)-185 | United States Navy | World War II: Operation Overlord: The landing craft infantry (large) was lost off Normandy. |
| USS LCI(L)-232 | United States Navy | World War II: Operation Overlord: The landing craft infantry (large) was lost off Normandy. 14 crewmen were killed. |
| USS LCI(L)-497 | United States Navy | World War II: Operation Overlord: The landing craft infantry (large) struck a mine and sank in the English Channel off Omaha Beach, Normandy. |
| USS LCI(L)-553 | United States Navy | World War II: Operation Overlord: The landing craft infantry (large) was shelled and sunk in the English Channel off Omaha Beach, Normandy. |
| USS LCT-22 | United States Navy | World War II: Operation Overlord: The LCT Mk 5-class landing craft tank was lost off Normandy. |
| USS LCT-25 | United States Navy | World War II: Operation Overlord: The LCT Mk 5-class landing craft tank was shelled, burned, and sunk in the English Channel off Normandy. Two crewmen were killed. |
| USS LCT-27 | United States Navy | World War II: Operation Overlord: The LCT Mk 5-class landing craft tank ran aground, then capsized and sank in shallow water off Normandy. Heavy weather pushed the wreck ashore. Survivors were rescued by USS LCT-207 (United States Navy). |
| USS LCT-30 | United States Navy | World War II: Operation Overlord: The LCT Mk 5-class landing craft tank crashed through obstacles on beach Fox Green taking enemy strong point under fire and silencing enemy guns holding up troops attempting to get off beach. The vessel was abandoned on the beach after being disabled by German 88 mm (3 in) guns and machine gun fire. Presidential Unit Citation. |
| USS LCT-52 | United States Navy | World War II: Operation Overlord: The LCT Mk 5-class landing craft tank was shelled and sunk in the English Channel off Normandy. |
| USS LCT-197 | United States Navy | World War II: Operation Overlord: The LCT Mk 5-class landing craft tank struck a mine, capsized and sank in the English Channel off Omaha Beach, Normandy. |
| USS LCT-229 | United States Navy | World War II: Operation Overlord: The LCT Mk 5-class landing craft tank was lost off Normandy. |
| USS LCT-294 | United States Navy | World War II: Operation Overlord: The LCT Mk 5-class landing craft tank was damaged by a mine and scuttled off Omaha Beach, Normandy. The crew was rescued by USS LCT-20 (United States Navy). There were no casualties. |
| USS LCT-305 | United States Navy | World War II: Operation Overlord: The LCT Mk 5-class landing craft tank was sunk by mine and artillery fire off Omaha Beach, Normandy. One crew was killed and seven wounded. |
| USS LCT-332 | United States Navy | World War II: Operation Overlord: The LCT Mk 5-class landing craft tank was sunk by mine off Normandy. |
| USS LCT-362 | United States Navy | World War II: Operation Overlord: The LCT Mk 5-class landing craft tank capsized and sank in heavy weather off Normandy. |
| USS LCT-364 | United States Navy | World War II: Operation Overlord: The LCT Mk 5-class landing craft tank was sunk by mine and a shell off Omaha Beach, Normandy. |
| USS LCT-397 | United States Navy | World War II: Operation Neptune: The landing craft tank struck a mine and sank in the English Channel off Utah Beach. |
| USS LCT-555 | United States Navy | World War II: Operation Overlord: The LCT Mk 5-class landing craft tank was sunk by mine off Normandy, or was shelled and damaged in the English Channel off the coast of Normandy by German shore-based artillery. She was declared a total loss. |
| USS LCT-597 | United States Navy | World War II: Operation Overlord: The landing craft tank was shelled and damaged in the English Channel off the coast of Normandy by German shore-based artillery. She was declared a total loss. |
| USS LCT-612 | United States Navy | World War II: Operation Overlord: The landing craft tank was shelled and sunk in the English Channel off the coast of Normandy by German shore-based artillery. She was declared a total loss. |
| USS LCT-703 | United States Navy | World War II: Operation Overlord: The LCT Mk 5-class landing craft tank was sunk by mine off Normandy. |
| USS LCT-777 | United States Navy | World War II: Operation Overlord: The landing craft tank was shelled and damaged in the English Channel off the coast of Normandy by German shore-based artillery. She was declared a total loss. |
| HMS LCT 2039 | Royal Navy | World War II: The LCT Mk 5-class landing craft tank (134/286 t, 1942) swamped and capsized in heavy weather off Gold Beach, Normandy, and was scuttled by Royal Navy ships. Two crewmen were killed. |
| HMS LCT 2191 | Royal Navy | World War II: Operation Overlord: The LCT Mk 5-class landing craft tank (134/286 t, 1942) was shelled and sunk by German 88 mm (3 in) artillery off Sword Beach, Normandy. Six crewmen were killed. |
| HMS LCT 2283 | Royal Navy | World War II: Operation Overlord: The LCT Mk 5-class landing craft tank (134/286 t, 1942) was lost off Normandy. |
| USS LST-715 | United States Navy | World War II: Operation Overlord: The landing ship tank was torpedoed and sunk in the English Channel off Saint-Vaast-la-Hougue, Manch by S 100, S 142, S 150 and S 168 (all Kriegsmarine). |
| M 4031 Pesce Spada | Kriegsmarine | World War II: The minesweeper struck a mine and sank in the Bay of Biscay off Brest, Finistère, France. |
| MR 7 | Kriegsmarine | The MR 1-class river minesweeper was sunk on this date. |
| HMS MTB 248 | Royal Navy | World War II: Operation Overlord: The White 73'-class motor torpedo boat (40/47 t, 1943) was sunk in a collision in the English Channel. |
| Minazuki | Imperial Japanese Navy | World War II: The Mutsuki-class destroyer was torpedoed and sunk in the Sibutu Passage (4°05′N 119°30′E) by USS Harder ( United States Navy) with the loss of 109 of her 154 crew. Survivors were rescued by Wakatsuki (Imperial Japanese Navy). |
| USS PC-1261 | United States Navy | World War II: Operation Overlord: The PC-461-class submarine chaser was shelled and sunk by German coastal artillery off Normandy (49°30′N 01°10′W). |
| R 221 | Kriegsmarine | World War II: The Type R-218 minesweeper was bombed and sunk by aircraft off Blainville-sur-Orne, Calvados, France. |
| Reaumur | Germany | World War II: The cargo ship was torpedoed and sunk in the Aegean Sea, east of the island of Euboea, Greece (38°24′N 24°35′E) by HMS Sickle (Royal Navy). |
| SF 393 | Kriegsmarine | The Siebel ferry was sunk on this date. |
| Sambut | United Kingdom | World War II: The Liberty ship (7,219 GRT, 1943) was shelled and sunk in the Strait of Dover by German artillery. |
| HNoMS Svenner | Royal Norwegian Navy | World War II: The S-class destroyer was torpedoed and sunk in the English Channel off Normandy by Falke, Möwe, Jaguar, and T28 (all Kriegsmarine), with the loss of 41 Royal Norwegian Navy and 2 Royal Navy crewmen. |
| V 421 Rauzan | Kriegsmarine | The naval trawler/Vorpostenboot was sunk on this date. |
| V 1509 Rau II | Kriegsmarine | World War II: The Vorpostenboot was sunk in the English Channel off Cap d'Antifer in an engagement with Allied naval vessels covering Overlord. Of her crew, 2 were killed, 26 were reported missing and 35 were rescued by V 1511 Rau IV. |
| HMS Wrestler | Royal Navy | World War II: Operation Overlord: The W-class destroyer (1,100/1,490 t, 1918) struck a mine in the English Channel off Juno Beach, Calvados, France. She was declared a total loss. |

== 7 June ==
List of shipwrecks: 7 June 1944
| Ship | State | Description |
|---|---|---|
| Aghios Spyridon | Greece | World War II: The cargo ship was scuttled off Gold Beach, Calvados, France. She was refloated in October 1945 and scrapped. |
| HMS Centurion | Royal Navy | HMS Centurion World War II: Operation Neptune: The target ship, a former King George V-class battleship (23,000/25,500 t, 1913), was sunk as a breakwater in the English Channel off Normandy, France. |
| Empire Defiance | United Kingdom | World War II: Operation Neptune: The cargo ship (4,632 GRT, 1909) was sunk as a breakwater at Sword Beach, Normandy, France. The wreck was raised in 1951 and scrapped. |
| F 557 | Kriegsmarine | The Type C2 Marinefahrprahm was sunk on this date. |
| USAT Francis C. Harrington | United States Army | World War II: Operation Overlord: The transport ship struck a mine and sank off Normandy. Twenty-six wounded were rescued by USS Blessman (United States Navy). |
| Georgios P. | United Kingdom | World War II: The cargo ship was scuttled off Gold Beach. |
| Hayanami | Imperial Japanese Navy | World War II: The Yūgumo-class destroyer was torpedoed and sunk in the Sibutu Passage (4°43′N 120°03′E) by USS Harder (United States Navy) with the loss of 208 of her 253 crew. Survivors were rescued by Urakaze (Imperial Japanese Navy). |
| KF 613 | Kriegsmarine | The Type C2 Artilleriefährprahm was sunk on this date. |
| USS LCI(L)-416 | United States Navy | World War II: The LCI Mk 5-class landing craft infantry (large) was sunk by mine off Omaha Beach, Normandy. |
| HMS LCT 427 | Royal Navy | World War II: The LCT Mk 3-class landing craft tank (350/625 t, 1943) was sunk in a collision with HMS Rodney (Royal Navy) off Southampton. |
| USS LCT-436 | United States Navy | World War II: The landing craft tank struck a mine and sank in the English Channel off Utah Beach, Normandy. |
| USS LCT-458 | United States Navy | World War II: The LCT Mk 5-class landing craft tank was sunk by mine off Utah Beach, Normandy. Thirty-five members of B Battery, 29th Field Artillery Battalion were killed and 22 were wounded. |
| USS LCT-486 | United States Navy | World War II: The LCT Mk 5-class landing craft tank was sunk by mine off Normandy. |
| USS LCT-586 | United States Navy | World War II: The landing craft tank struck a mine and sank in the English Channel off Utah Beach. |
| HMS LCT 630 | Royal Navy | World War II: The LCT Mk 4-class landing craft tank was lost off Normandy. |
| HMS LCT 690 | Royal Navy | World War II: The LCT Mk 4-class landing craft tank was lost off Normandy. |
| HMS LCT 715 | Royal Navy | World War II: The LCT Mk 4-class landing craft tank was lost off Normandy. |
| HMS LCT 921 | Royal Navy | World War II: The LCT Mk 4-class landing craft tank was torpedoed off Normandy and almost split in two; wreck brought back to Southampton. |
| HMS LCT 1035 | Royal Navy | World War II: The LCT Mk 4-class landing craft tank was lost off Normandy. |
| HMS LCT 1124 | Royal Navy | World War II: The LCT Mk 4-class landing craft tank was lost off Normandy. |
| Manchester Spinner | United Kingdom | World War II: Operation Neptune: The cargo ship (4,767 GRT, 1918) was sunk as a breakwater, Normandy. |
| S 139 | Kriegsmarine | World War II: The Type 1939/40 Schnellboot struck a mine laid by British motor gun boats and sank in the English Channel off Cap Barfleur, Seine-Inférieure, France. 22 crew were killed and the four survivors were captured. |
| S 140 | Kriegsmarine | World War II: The Type 1939/40 Schnellboot struck a mine laid by British motor gun boats and sank in the English Channel off Cap Barfleur, Seine-Inférieure, France. 15 crew were killed. There were 8 survivors. |
| Shinroku Maru | Japan | World War II: The transport ship was torpedoed and sunk in the Pacific Ocean north east of Bonin by USS Whale (United States Navy). |
| Sirehei | United Kingdom | World War II: Operation Overlord: The cargo ship (3,888 GRT, 1907) was sunk as a breakwater as part of Gooseberry 3, Gold Beach. |
| USS Susan B. Anthony | United States Navy | World War II: Operation Overlord: The transport ship struck a mine and sank in the English Channel off Normandy (49°49′24″N 0°42′18″W). All 2,689 people were rescued by USS Blessman, USS Pinto and a third ship (all United States Navy). |
| USS Tide | United States Navy | USS Tide (center) sinking World War II: Operation Overlord: The Auk-class minesweeper struck a mine and sank in the English Channel off Normandy (49°36′59″N 1°04′59″W). |
| U-629 | Kriegsmarine | World War II: The Type VIIC submarine was depth charged and sunk in the Bay of Biscay west of Brest, Finistère, France (48°34′N 5°23′W) by a Consolidated B-24 Liberator aircraft of 53 Squadron, Royal Air Force with the loss of all 51 crew. |
| U-955 | Kriegsmarine | World War II: The Type VIIC submarine was depth charged and sunk in the Bay of Biscay north east of Cape Ortegal, Spain (45°13′N 8°30′W) by a Short Sunderland aircraft of 201 Squadron, Royal Air Force with the loss of all 50 crew. |

== 8 June ==
List of shipwrecks: 8 June 1944
| Ship | State | Description |
|---|---|---|
| Artemas Ward | United States | World War II: The Liberty ship was sunk as a breakwater as part of Gooseberry 2, Omaha Beach, Calvados, France. She foundered in storms between 19 and 22 June. |
| Audacious | United States | World War II: The cargo ship was sunk as a breakwater as part of Gooseberry 2, Omaha Beach. |
| Baialoide | United States | World War II: The cargo ship was scuttled as a breakwater for Gooseberry No. 2 off Omaha Beach. Raised 1949, broken up at Ghent. |
| Belgique | United Kingdom | World War II: The cargo ship (4,932 GRT, 1902) was sunk as a breakwater as part of Gooseberry 4, Juno Beach, Basse-Normandie. |
| Benjamin Contee | United States | World War II: The Liberty ship was sunk as a breakwater as part of Gooseberry 1, Utah Beach, Manche, France. She later foundered in a storm. |
| CHANT 61 | United Kingdom | The Channel tanker (403 GRT, 1944) capsized and sank in the English Channel off Normandy. She was on a voyage from Thameshaven, Essex to Normandy. |
| David O. Saylor | United States | The 366-foot (112 m), concrete-hulled cargo ship was scuttled off Utah Beach, Normandy as part of Gooseberry 1 (49°26′N 01°10′W). |
| Flight Command | Yugoslavia | World War II: The cargo ship was sunk as a breakwater off Omaha Beach. |
| Forbin | United Kingdom | World War II: The cargo ship was sunk as part of Gooseberry 5 off Sword Beach. She was raised post-war and scrapped. |
| Galveston | United States | World War II: The 1037 class cargo ship was sunk as a breakwater for Gooseberry No. 2 off Omaha Beach. |
| George S. Wassen | United States | World War II: The Liberty ship was sunk as a breakwater as part of Gooseberry 1, Utah Beach. She later foundered in a storm. |
| George W. Childs | United States | World War II: The Liberty ship was sunk as a breakwater as part of Gooseberry 2, Omaha Beach. |
| Harusame | Imperial Japanese Navy | World War II: The Shiratsuyu-class destroyer was bombed and sunk in the Pacific Ocean 30 nautical miles (56 km) north west of Manokwari, New Guinea (0°05′S 132°45′E) by North American B-25 Mitchell aircraft of the United States Army Air Forces with the loss of 74 of her 226 crew. |
| James Iredell | United States | World War II: The Liberty ship was sunk as a breakwater as part of Gooseberry 2, Omaha Beach. She was later wrecked in a storm. |
| James W. Marshall | United States | World War II: The Liberty ship was sunk as a breakwater as part of Gooseberry 2, Omaha Beach. She was later wrecked in a storm. |
| Kazagumo | Imperial Japanese Navy | World War II: The Yūgumo-class destroyer was torpedoed and sunk in Davao Gulf (6°03′N 125°57′E) by USS Hake (United States Navy) with the loss of 95 of her 228 crew. Survivors were rescued by Asagumo (Imperial Japanese Navy). |
| HMS Lawford | Royal Navy | World War II: The Captain-class frigate (1,140/1,430 t, 1943) was sunk in the English Channel (49°25′43″N 0°24′47″W) by a Henschel Hs 293 glide bomb dropped by a Dornier Do 217 aircraft of III Staffeln, Kampfgeschwader 100, Luftwaffe, with the loss of 37 of her crew. |
| HMS LCI(L)-105 | Royal Navy | World War II: The landing craft infantry (large) (194/387 t, 1943) was sunk off Normandy by a German schnellbotte of the 9. S-Flottille. Seven crewmen were killed. |
| HMS LCT 875 | Royal Navy | World War II: The LCT Mk 4-class landing craft tank (350/586 t, 1943) was sunk off Normandy by a German schnellbotte of the 9. S-Flottille. 12 crewmen were killed. |
| Matt W. Ransom | United States | World War II: The Liberty ship was sunk as a breakwater as part of Gooseberry 1, Utah Beach. She was later wrecked in a storm. |
| HMS Minster | Royal Navy | World War II: The net layer (707 GRT, 1924) struck a mine and sank off Utah Beach. |
| Olambala | Panama | World War II: The cargo ship was scuttled as a breakwater off Omaha Beach. |
| Parkhaven | United Kingdom | World War II: The cargo ship was scuttled as a breakwater off Gold Beach. |
| Pennsylvanian | United States | World War II: The cargo ship was sunk as a breakwater off Omaha Beach. |
| Potter | United States | World War II: The 1037 class cargo ship was sunk as a breakwater off Omaha Beach. |
| USS Rich | United States Navy | USS Rich World War II: Operation Overlord: The Buckley-class destroyer escort struck a mine and sank in the English Channel off Normandy (49°31′N 1°10′W) with the loss of 91 of her 213 crew. |
| Robin Gray | United States | World War II: The cargo ship was sunk as a breakwater off Omaha Beach. |
| Shioya Maru | Japan | World War II: The tanker was torpedoed and sunk in the Celebes Sea off Manado Dutch East Indies by USS Rasher (United States Navy). |
| Tainan Maru | Japan | World War II: The ship was torpedoed and sunk in the East China Sea by USS Tang (United States Navy). |
| Tamahoko Maru | Japan | World War II: The ship was torpedoed and sunk in the East China Sea by USS Tang (United States Navy). |
| U-373 | Kriegsmarine | World War II: The Type VIIC submarine was depth charged and sunk in the Bay of Biscay west of Brest, Finistère, France (48°10′N 5°31′W) by a Consolidated B-24 Liberator aircraft of 224 Squadron, Royal Air Force with the loss of four of her 51 crew. |
| U-441 | Kriegsmarine | World War II: The Type VIIC submarine was depth charged and sunk in the English Channel (approximately 48°27′N 5°47′W) by a Consolidated B-24 Liberator aircraft of 224 Squadron, Royal Air Force with the loss of all 51 crew. |
| U-970 | Kriegsmarine | World War II: The Type VIIC submarine was depth charged and sunk in the Bay of Biscay west of Bordeaux, Gironde, France (45°15′N 4°10′W) by a Short Sunderland aircraft of 228 Squadron, Royal Air Force with the loss of 38 of her 52 crew. |
| Victory Sword | United States | World War II: The cargo ship was sunk as a breakwater off Utah Beach. |
| West Cheswald | United States | World War II: The cargo ship was sunk as a breakwater off Utah Beach. |
| West Grama | United States | World War II: The Design 1013 class cargo ship was scuttled as a breakwater off Omaha Beach, Calvados. |
| West Honaker | United States | World War II: The cargo ship was scuttled as a breakwater off Utah Beach. |
| West Nilus | United States | World War II: The cargo ship was scuttled as a breakwater off Omaha Beach. |
| West Noho | United States | World War II: The cargo ship was scuttled as a breakwater off Utah Beach. |
| Wilscox | United States | World War II: The 1027-class cargo ship was scuttled as a breakwater off Omaha Beach. |
| Winha | United Kingdom | World War II: The cargo ship (3,331 GRT, 1904) was scuttled as a blockship as part of Gooseberry 3, Arromanches, Calvados, France. |

== 9 June ==
List of shipwrecks: 9 June 1944
| Ship | State | Description |
|---|---|---|
| AF 15 | Kriegsmarine | World War II: The Type C Artilleriefährprahm was bombed and sunk at Dieppe, Seine-Inférieure, France in an Allied air raid. She was refloated in December 1945 and scrapped. |
| HMS Alynbank | Royal Navy | World War II: The flak ship (5,157 GRT, 1925) was scuttled as a blockship off Sword Beach, Calvados, France. |
| Becheville | United Kingdom | World War II: The cargo ship was scuttled as a blockship off Sword Beach. |
| Bendoran | United Kingdom | World War II: The cargo ship was scuttled as a blockship off Juno Beach, Arromanches, Calvados. She was refloated in May 1947 and scrapped. |
| Courbet | Free French Naval Forces | World War II: The Courbet-class battleship was scuttled as a blockship off Sword Beach. |
| Dover Hill | United Kingdom | World War II: The cargo ship (5,815 GRT, 1918) was sunk as a blockship off Ouistreham, Normandy, France, as part of Gooseberry 5 breakwater for Sword Beach. |
| HMS Durban | Royal Navy | HMS Durban and HNLMS Sumatra World War II: The decommissioned Danae-class light cruiser (4,267/5,719 t, 1921) was sunk as a blockship as part of Gooseberry 5 breakwater. (44°20′N 00°16′W) |
| Elswick Park | United Kingdom | World War II: The cargo ship was scuttled as a blockship off Gold Beach, Arromanches. She was refloated in 1947 and scrapped. |
| Empire Bunting | United Kingdom | World War II: Operation Neptune: The Design 1105 cargo ship (6,448 GRT, 1919) was sunk as a breakwater at Juno Beach. The wreck was raised in 1947 and scrapped. |
| Empire Flamingo | United Kingdom | World War II: The Design 1022 ship (5,519 GRT, 1920) was sunk as a blockship as part of Gooseberry 4, Juno Beach. The bow section was salvaged in 1948 and taken under tow for Newport, Monmouthshire but sank en route. |
| Empire Moorhen | United Kingdom | World War II: The Design 1016 ship was (5,617 GRT, 1919) sunk as a blockship as part of Gooseberry 4. Raised in 1947 and scrapped. |
| Empire Waterhen | United Kingdom | World War II: The Design 1027 ship (6,004 GRT, 1920) was sunk as a blockship as part of Gooseberry 4. Raised in 1948 and scrapped. |
| F 411 | Kriegsmarine | The Type C Marinefahrprahm was sunk on this date. |
| Flowergate | United Kingdom | World War II: The cargo ship was scuttled as a blockship off Gold Beach. She was refloated in June 1946 and later scrapped. |
| Formigny | France | World War II: The cargo ship was sunk as part of Gooseberry 5 off Sword Beach. She was later refloated and scrapped. |
| Ingman | United Kingdom | World War II: The cargo ship (3,169 GRT, 1907) was sunk as a blockship as part of Gooseberry 3, Gold Beach. She was raised in 1945, and arrived at Newport, Monmouthshire for scrapping on 28 December. |
| Innerton | United Kingdom | World War II: The cargo ship was sunk as a blockship off Gold Beach. She was later refloated and scrapped. |
| Jytte | Denmark | World War II: The coaster (100 GRT, 1910) was sunk by a mine in the Kattegat (56°39′N 10°56′W). The master was the only survivor. His wife, his child and the two crew members were killed. |
| USS LST-314 | United States Navy | World War II: The LCT Mk 2-class landing ship tank was torpedoed and sunk in Seine Bay 30 nautical miles (56 km) east of Cherbourg, Seine-Inférieure, France (49°43′N 00°52′W) by E-boats S172, S174, S175, and S187, (all Kriegsmarine). |
| USS LST-376 | United States Navy | World War II: The LCT Mk 2-class landing ship tank was torpedoed and damaged in Seine Bay 30 nautical miles (56 km) east of Cherbourg (49°43′N 00°52′W) by E-boats S172, S174, S175, and S187 (all Kriegsmarine). Scuttled by United States Navy ships (49°43′N 00°53′W) |
| Mariposa | United Kingdom | World War II: The cargo ship was sunk as a blockship off Juno Beach. |
| Matsukaze | Imperial Japanese Navy | World War II: The Kamikaze-class destroyer was torpedoed and sunk in the Pacific Ocean 70 nautical miles (130 km) north east of Chichijima, Ogasawara Islands (26°59′N 143°13′E) by USS Swordfish (United States Navy). |
| USS Meredith | United States Navy | World War II: Operation Overlord: Damaged by a mine on 7 June with the loss of at least seven crew members, the Allen M. Sumner-class destroyer sank in the English Channel off Utah Beach following Luftwaffe bombing which split her in two. USS Bates (United States Navy) rescued 163 survivors from her 336 crew. The wreck was raised and scrapped in September 1960. |
| Modlin | Poland | World War II: The 341.2-foot (104.0 m), 3,587-ton cargo vessel was scuttled as a blockship in "Gooseberry No.3", Gold Beach, Normandy. She was refloated in 1944 and broken up at Dover, or salvaged and scrapped in 1946. |
| Njegos | United Kingdom | World War II: The cargo ship was sunk as a breakwater off Gold Beach. She was later refloated and scrapped. |
| Saltersgate | United Kingdom | World War II: The cargo ship was sunk as a blockship off Juno Beach. |
| SK-517 | Soviet Navy | The BMO Project 194-class armored anti-submarine boat was sunk on this date. |
| HNLMS Sumatra | Royal Navy | World War II: The Java-class cruiser (6,670/8,208 t, 1926) was scuttled off Ouistreham, Calvados as a part of Gooseberry 5. Wreck is sold for scrap in 1951. |
| TA27 | Kriegsmarine | World War II: The Ariete-class torpedo boat was bombed and sunk at Porto-Ferraio, Italy by United States Army Air Force aircraft. |
| Tanais | Germany | World War II: The cargo ship was torpedoed and sunk north of Dia, Crete (35°35′N 25°11′E) by HMS Vivid (Royal Navy). |
| Tanikaze | Imperial Japanese Navy | World War II: The Kagerō-class destroyer torpedoed and sunk in the Sibutu Passage (5°42′N 120°41′E) by USS Harder (United States Navy) with the loss of 114 of her 240 crew. Survivors were rescued by Urakaze (Imperial Japanese Navy). |
| UJ-6078 La Havraise | Kriegsmarine | World War II: The submarine chaser was sunk in the Mediterranean Sea off La Ciotat, Bouches-du-Rhône by Casabianca (Free French Naval Forces). |
| Vetruvius | United States | The 350-foot (110 m), 10,950-ton, concrete-hulled cargo ship was scuttled off Normandy as part of Gooseberry 1 (49°26′N 01°10′W). |
| Vinlake | United Kingdom | World War II: The cargo ship was sunk as a breakwater off Gold Beach. She was refloated in 1946 and taken to Falmouth, Cornwall in a leaky condition. She was beached at St. Mawes, Cornwall, where she was broken up. |
| Z32 | Kriegsmarine | World War II: The Type 1936A (Mob) destroyer was hit by gunfire from HMCS Haida and HMCS Huron (both Royal Canadian Navy) and beached off the Île de Batz, Finistère, France (48°47′N 04°07′W). |
| ZH1 | Kriegsmarine | World War II: The Gerard Callenburgh-class destroyer was torpedoed and sunk in a surface battle off the Île de Batz by HMS Ashanti (Royal Navy). |

== 10 June ==
List of shipwrecks: 10 June 1944
| Ship | State | Description |
|---|---|---|
| Belgique | United Kingdom | World War II: The cargo ship was scuttled off Normandy as a blockship/breakwater for Gooseberry No. 5. |
| Charles Morgan | United States | World War II: The Liberty ship was bombed and sunk in the English Channel off the coast of Normandy, France by Luftwaffe aircraft. |
| USS Glennon | United States Navy | World War II: After striking a mine in the Baie de la Seine off Quinéville, Manche, France, on 8 June and being abandoned on 9 June due to shelling from German shore-based artillery, the Gleaves-class destroyer sank at 49°31′15″N 001°09′16″W. |
| Hiyoshi Maru | Japan | World War II: The cargo ship was shelled and sunk in the Strait of Malacca (3°05′N 99°56′E) by HMS Tantalus (Royal Navy). |
| Innsbruck | Germany | World War II: The hospital ship was sunk in an American air raid on Trieste, Italy. |
| Kinmon Maru | Japan | The cargo ship was gutted by fire at Singapore. She was declared a total loss. |
| Lynghaug | United Kingdom | World War II: Operation Overlord: The cargo ship (2,829 GRT, 1919) was sunk as a breakwater as part of Gooseberry 3 off Gold Beach, Arromanches-les-Bains, Calvados, France. |
| USS LCI(L)-416 | United States Navy | World War II: The LCI-351-class landing craft infantry struck a mine and sank off Omaha Beach, Normandy. |
| USS LCT-209 | United States Navy | World War II: The LCT Mk 5-class landing craft tank ran aground off Normandy opening her hull and flooding the engine room. Drifted off on 19 June 1944, or destroyed at Salerno, Italy by the explosion of Bushrod Washington (United States) on 15 September 1943 during the Battle of Salerno. |
| USS LST-499 | United States Navy | World War II: The LCT Mk 2-class landing ship tank was sunk by mine off Normandy (49°30′N 01°10′W). |
| Mistral | Free French Naval Forces | World War II: The Bourrasque-class destroyer was shelled and damaged in the English Channel off Quinéville, Manche. She was declared a constructive total loss. |
| HMMTB 681 | Royal Navy | World War II: The Fairmile D motor torpedo boat (102/118 t, 1943) was sunk in the North Sea off Den Helder, North Holland, Netherlands in an attack on a convoy escorted by V 1314 Gustav Hugo Deiters, V 2021 Nurnberg and V 2022 Emil Colsmann (all Kriegsmarine). Two crewmen were killed and seven wounded. |
| Phoenix A-46 | United Kingdom | World War II: The concrete caisson for the Mulberry harbors was sunk by a mine 1.75 miles (2.82 km) from buoy 58-H in the English Channel, while under tow. |
| R 110 | Kriegsmarine | World War II: The Type R-41 minesweeper was sunk by mines off Hook of Holland, South Holland, Netherlands. |
| Ro-111 | Imperial Japanese Navy | World War II: The Ro-100-class submarine was depth charged, shelled and sunk in the Pacific Ocean (00°26′N 149°16′E) by USS Taylor ( United States Navy). |
| Shinei Maru | Japan | World War II: The auxiliary sailing vessel was bombed and sunk off Manokwari in the Pacific Ocean by USAAF B-25 Mitchell bombers. |
| Toyama Maru | Japan | World War II: The cargo liner was torpedoed and sunk in the Pacific Ocean off the Ryukyu Islands by USS Sturgeon ( United States Navy). |
| U-821 | Kriegsmarine | World War II: The Type VIIC submarine was depth charged and sunk in the Bay of Biscay off Brest, Finistère, France (48°31′N 5°11′W) by a Consolidated B-24 Liberator aircraft of 206 Squadron, Royal Air Force and four de Havilland Mosquito aircraft of 248 Squadron, Royal Air Force with the loss of 50 of her 51 crew. |
| UJ 6078 La Havraise | Kriegsmarine | World War II: The auxiliary submarine chaser/naval trawler was torpedoed and sunk 12 nautical miles (22 km) southeast of La Ciotat (43°08′N 05°36′E) by HMS Untiring (Royal Navy). 40 crewmen were killed, 20 survived. |
| V 1314 Gustav Hugo Deiters | Kriegsmarine | World War II: The Vorpostenboot was sunk in the North Sea off Den Helder by HMS MTB 666, HMS MTB 681, HMS MTB 683, HMS MTB 684, HMS MTB 687 and HMS MTB 723 (all Royal Navy). |
| V 2020 Alexander Becker | Kriegsmarine | World War II: The Vorpostenboot was sunk in the North Sea off Egmond aan Zee by Royal Navy Motor Torpedo Boats. |
| V 2021 Nurnberg | Kriegsmarine | World War II: The Vorpostenboot was sunk in the North Sea off Den Helder by HMMTB 666, HMMTB 681, HMMTB 683, HMMTB 684, HMMTB 687 and HMMTB 723 (all Royal Navy). |
| V 2022 Emil Colsmann | Kriegsmarine | World War II: The Vorpostenboot was sunk in the North Sea off Den Helder by HMMTB 666, HMMTB 681, HMMTB 683, HMMTB 684, HMMTB 687 and HMMTB 723 (all Royal Navy). |

== 11 June ==
List of shipwrecks: 11 June 1944
| Ship | State | Description |
|---|---|---|
| Anona | United States | The cargo ship, a former yacht, foundered from buckled hull plates in the Gulf of Mexico (29°10′N 87°49′W) in 4,000 feet (1,200 m) of water. The vessel's crew was rescued two days later by three Consolidated PBY Catalina aircraft. The wreck was located in 2002. |
| Asanagi Maru | Imperial Japanese Navy | World War II: The tanker was torpedoed and damaged in the Philippine Sea off Jolo, Philippines, by USS Redfin ( United States Navy). She was beached at (06°00′N 120°50′E), declared a constructive total loss and abandoned. There were no casualty. |
| Ashanti | United Kingdom | World War II: The cargo ship (534 GRT, 1936) was torpedoed and sunk in the English Channel off the Isle of Wight by S 177 and S 178 (both Kriegsmarine). |
| Brackenfield | United Kingdom | World War II: The cargo ship (657 GRT, 1937) was torpedoed and sunk in the English Channel off the Isle of Wight by S 177 and S 178 (both Kriegsmarine). |
| Chihaya Maru | Japan | World War II: The fishing vessel was torpedoed and sunk in the Pacific Ocean by USS Barb ( United States Navy). |
| Dungrange | United Kingdom | World War II: The cargo ship (621 GRT, 1914) was torpedoed and sunk in the English Channel off the Isle of Wight by S 177 and S 178 (both Kriegsmarine). |
| Halsted | Royal Navy | World War II: The Captain-class frigate (1,432/1,823 t, 1943) was torpedoed and severely damaged by German E-boats, or Jaguar and Möwe (all Kriegsmarine), off Normandy, France. She was declared a constructive total loss. 33 crewmen were killed. |
| Kainan Maru | Japan | World War II: The transport ship was torpedoed and sunk in the Andaman Sea off Phuket, Thailand by HMS Stoic (Royal Navy). |
| Keiyo Maru | Japan | World War II: The transport ship was sunk in the Pacific Ocean by vessels of Task Group 58.4 ( United States Navy). |
| Kokku Maru | Imperial Japanese Navy | World War II: The netlayer was sunk in the Pacific Ocean by vessels of Task Group 58.4 ( United States Navy). |
| USS LCI(L)-219 | United States Navy | World War II: The LCI-1-class landing craft infantry was sunk by German aircraft off Normandy. Six crewmen were killed. |
| USS LST-496 | United States Navy | World War II: The landing ship tank struck a mine off Normandy. Although assistance was given by USS Altus, USS Amesbury, USS ATA-125 and USS LCI-530 (all United States Navy), the ship capsized and sank. |
| HMMGB 17 | Royal Navy | World War II: The BPB 70'-class motor gun boat (30/38 t, 1940) was sunk by a mine off Normandy, France. |
| HMMTB 448 | Royal Navy | World War II: The motor torpedo boat (37/46 t, 1943) was sunk in the English Channel in a battle with S 84, S 100, S 112, S 130, S 136, S 138, S 142, S 144, S 146, S 150 and S 167 (all Kriegsmarine). |
| USS Partridge | United States Navy | World War II: The tugboat, a former Lapwing-class minesweeper, was torpedoed and sunk in the English Channel 11 nautical miles (20 km) off Vierville-sur-Mer, Calvados (49°30′N 00°50′E) by a Kriegsmarine E-boat. |
| Ro-42 | Imperial Japanese Navy | World War II: The Kaichū type submarine was Hedgehogged and sunk in the Pacific Ocean (10°05′N 168°22′E) by USS Bangust ( United States Navy) |
| S 136 | Kriegsmarine | World War II: The Type 1939/40 E-boat was sunk by Duff (Royal Navy), Sioux (Royal Canadian Navy) and ORP Krakowiak (Polish Navy). 19 crew were killed. |
| Sesame | Royal Navy | World War II: The Assurance-class rescue tug (700 GRT, 1944) was torpedoed and sunk by a German E-boat off Normandy, France. |
| "Suzanne" | United Kingdom | The launch, tied to and being towed by "Phoenix A-33", itself being towed, smashed into "Phoenix A-33" by rough seas causing her to sink. |
| Toten Maru | Japan | World War II: The fishing vessel was torpedoed and sunk in the Pacific Ocean by USS Barb ( United States Navy). |
| U-980 | Kriegsmarine | World War II: The Type VIIC submarine was depth charged and sunk in the North Sea west of Bergen, Norway (63°07′N 0°26′E) by a Consolidated PBY Catalina aircraft of 162 Squadron, Royal Canadian Air Force with the loss of all 52 crew. |

== 12 June ==
List of shipwrecks: 12 June 1944
| Ship | State | Description |
|---|---|---|
| Batavia Maru | Imperial Japanese Navy | World War II: Convoy 4611: The Indus Maru-class auxiliary transport ship was bombed and sunk about 100 nautical miles (190 km; 120 mi) west of Alamagan Island, Northern Mariana Islands (17°32′N 143°17′E) by United States Navy aircraft from Task Force 58 aircraft carriers USS Essex, USS Langley, and USS Cowpens (all United States Navy). 18 passengers and 59 crew were killed. |
| Bokuyo Maru | Imperial Japanese Navy | World War II: Convoy 4611: The cargo ship was bombed and sunk about 100 nautical miles (190 km) west of Alamagan Island, northwest of Saipan by United States Navy aircraft. |
| Fukoku Maru | Imperial Japanese Army | World War II: Convoy 4611: The cargo ship was bombed and sunk about 100 nautical miles (190 km; 120 mi) west of Alamagan Island, northwest of Saipan by United States Navy aircraft. |
| Imizu Maru | Imperial Japanese Navy | World War II: Convoy 4611: The Peacetime Standard Type C transport ship (2,924 GRT, 1940) was bombed and sunk about 100 nmi (190 km) west of Alamagan Island, northwest of Saipan (17°32′N 144°10′E) by United States Navy aircraft. |
| Kainan Maru | Japan | World War II: The passenger-cargo ship was torpedoed and sunk in the Andaman Sea off Phuket, Thailand, by the submarine HMS Stoic (Royal Navy). |
| Kamishima Maru | Imperial Japanese Navy | World War II: Convoy 4611: The transport ship was bombed and sunk northwest of Saipan (17°32′N 144°10′E) by United States Navy aircraft. |
| Keiyo Maru | Imperial Japanese Navy | World War II: Convoy 4611: The Shinko Maru-class transport ship was bombed and damaged off Saipan (15°14′N 145°44′E) by United States Navy aircraft. She was successfully beached on Saipan, but bombed and destroyed on 13 June. The crew was absorbed by the Saipan Garrison and were all killed in the Battle of Saipan, her captain being killed in the final banzai charges. |
| Kokko Maru | Imperial Japanese Navy | World War II: Convoy 4611: The Seiko Maru-class auxiliary netlayer (717 GRT, 1938) was bombed and sunk about 100 nmi (190 km) west of Alamagan Island, northwest of Saipan (17°32′N 144°01′E) by United States Navy aircraft. Two crew were killed. |
| HMS MGB 17 | Royal Navy | World War II: The motor gun boat was shelled and sunk in the English Channel off Boulogne, Pas-de-Calais, France by S 171 (Kriegsmarine). |
| Moji Maru | Imperial Japanese Army | World War II: Convoy 4611: The Osaka Maru-class auxiliary transport ship was bombed and sunk about 100 nmi (190 km) west of Alamagan Island, northwest of Saipan by United States Navy aircraft from Task Force 58 carriers USS Essex, USS Langley, and USS Cowpens (all United States Navy). 53 crewmen and five gunners were killed. |
| Nitcho Maru | Imperial Japanese Navy | World War II: Convoy 4611: The transport ship was bombed and sunk about 100 nmi (190 km) west of Alamagan Island, northwest of Saipan (17°32′N 143°10′E) by United States Navy aircraft. |
| Ōtori | Imperial Japanese Navy | World War II: Convoy 4611: The Ōtori-class torpedo boat was bombed and sunk 180 nautical miles (330 km) northwest of Saipan (17°32′N 144°00′E) by United States Navy aircraft. |
| Phoenix A-33 | United Kingdom | World War II: The concrete caisson for the Mulberry harbours was torpedoed and sunk in the English Channel by a Schnellboot, while under tow. 22 crew, passengers and gunners were killed, 9 survivors were rescued. |
| R-95 | Kriegsmarine | World War II: The Type R-41 minesweeper was sunk by mines off Gravelines, Nord, France. |
| R 231 | Kriegsmarine | World War II: The minesweeper was scuttled at Caen, Calvados, France. |
| Reikai Maru | Imperial Japanese Navy | World War II: Convoy 4611: The transport ship was bombed and sunk about 100 nmi (190 km) west of Alamagan Island, northwest of Saipan (17°30′N 144°00′E) by United States Navy aircraft. |
| S 153 | Kriegsmarine | World War II: The torpedo boat was sunk in the Adriatic Sea off Hvar, Yugoslavia by HMS Eggesford (Royal Navy). 14 crewmen were killed. |
| Shinto Maru | Japan | World War II: Convoy 4611: The cargo ship (a.k.a. Kamishima Maru) was bombed and sunk about 100 nmi (190 km) west of Alamagan Island, Northern Mariana Islands by United States Navy aircraft from Task Force 58 aircraft carriers USS Essex, USS Langley, and USS Cowpens (all United States Navy). 54 passengers and 53 crew were killed. |
| HMS Sickle | Royal Navy | World War II: The S-class submarine (842/990 t, 1942) struck a mine and sank in the Ionian Sea off Kythira, Greece. |
| Southern | United States | The 18-gross register ton, 40.6-foot (12.4 m) motor vessel was destroyed by fire at Hoonah, Territory of Alaska. |
| Tatsutagawa Maru | Imperial Japanese Navy | World War II: Convoy 4611: The Standard Peacetime Type D auxiliary transport ship was bombed and heavily damaged east of Ogasawara-shoto, Bonin Islands, by United States Navy aircraft from USS Bataan. 15 crewmen and two passengers were killed. She was left drifting until 15 June when she was shelled and sunk by USS Boyd and USS Charrette (both United States Navy) (25°02′N 144°37′E). |
| Tenryugawa Maru | Imperial Japanese Navy | World War II: Convoy 4611: The transport ship was bombed and sunk about 100 nmi (190 km) west of Alamagan Island, northwest of Saipan (17°32′N 144°01′E) by United States Navy aircraft. |
| Tsushima Maru | Japan | World War II: Convoy 4611: The cargo ship was bombed and sunk northwest of Saipan by United States Navy aircraft. |
| U-490 | Kriegsmarine | World War II: The Type XIV submarine was depth charged and sunk in the Atlantic Ocean (42°47′N 40°08′W) by USS Frost, USS Huse, USS Inch, USS Snowden and aircraft based on USS Croatan (all United States Navy). All 60 crew survived. |
| V 206 Otto Bröhan | Kriegsmarine | World War II: The Vorpostenboot was scuttled at Caen, France. |
| V 212 Friedrich Busse | Kriegsmarine | World War II: The Vorpostenboot was scuttled at Caen, France. |
| V 1250 | Kriegsmarine | World War II: The Vorpostenboot was sunk in an Allied air raid on Wesermünde, Germany. |
| V 1507 Rau I | Kriegsmarine | World War II: The Vorpostenboot struck a mine and sank in the English Channel off Cap d'Antifer, Seine-Inférieure, France. |
| Vs 217 | Kriegsmarine | World War II: The patrol boat struck a mine and sank in the Pomeranian Bight. |

== 13 June ==
List of shipwrecks: 13 June 1944
| Ship | State | Description |
|---|---|---|
| HMS Boadicea | Royal Navy | World War II: Convoy EBC 8: The B-class destroyer (1,360/1,747 t, 1931) was torpedoed and sunk in the English Channel off the Isle of Portland, Dorset (50°28′12″N 2°29′30″W) by Luftwaffe aircraft with the loss of 126 of her 138 crew. |
| CHa-51 | Imperial Japanese Navy | The CHa-1-class auxiliary submarine chaser was lost off Rabaul, New Guinea to unknown causes. |
| Fenja | Sweden | World War II: The cargo ship struck a mine and sank in the Aegean Sea east of Kalymnos, Greece. |
| I-33 | Imperial Japanese Navy | The B1 type submarine sank in the Iyo Nada near Kure, Japan during diving trials when wood scaffolding from recent work jammed the starboard main induction valve. One hundred and two crewmen were killed; there were two survivors. She was raised and scrapped in 1953. |
| KM-08 | Kriegsmarine | World War II: The auxiliary minesweeper was shelled by BK-213 and BK-322 (both Soviet Navy), rammed by BK-213, pushing her aground on the shore of Lake Peipus and wrecked on rocks. Two crewmen were rescued. Four crewmen were captured, of which two later died. |
| HMS LCT 967 | Royal Navy | World War II: The LCT Mk 4-class landing craft tank (350/586 t, 1943) was sunk by a mine. |
| M 83 | Kriegsmarine | World War II: The minesweeper was sunk in the English Channel off Cap La Hougue, Manche, France by Royal Navy motor torpedo boats. |
| HMS MMS 229 | Royal Navy | World War II: The MMS-class minesweeper (255/295 t, 1942) was sunk by a mine off Normandy. |
| R-50 | Kriegsmarine | World War II: The Type R-41 minesweeper was sunk by mines off Tourville-sur-Arques, Seine-Inférieure, France. |
| R-97 | Kriegsmarine | World War II: The Type R-41 minesweeper was bombed and sunk at Boulogne, Pas-de-Calais, France by Bristol Beaufighter aircraft of 143 and 236 Squadrons, Royal Air Force. |
| Ro-36 | Imperial Japanese Navy | World War II: The Kaichu type submarine was shelled and sunk in the Pacific Ocean 75 nautical miles (139 km) east of Saipan, Northern Mariana Islands (15°21′N 147°00′E) by USS Melvin ( United States Navy). Seventy-seven crewmen were killed. |
| Reiaas | Norway | World War II: Convoy FWC 5: The cargo ship(1,128 GRT) collided in the English Channel off Normandy, France with Folda ( United Kingdom). Two British gunners were trapped in their cabin by the collision and died when she sank shortly thereafter when a storm occurred. All other 23 crew survived and most of them were rescued by Rowansfield ( United Kingdom). |
| S 178 | Kriegsmarine | World War II: The Type 1939/40 E-boat was attacked and sunk in the English Channel by Bristol Beaufighter aircraft of 143 and 236 Squadrons, Royal Air Force. 17 crew were killed. |
| S 179 | Kriegsmarine | World War II: The Type 1939/40 E-boat was attacked and sunk in the English Channel by Bristol Beaufighter aircraft of 143 and 236 Squadrons, Royal Air Force. 13 crew were killed. |
| S 189 | Kriegsmarine | World War II: The Type 1939/40 E-boat was attacked and sunk in the English Channel by Bristol Beaufighter aircraft of 143 and 236 Squadrons, Royal Air Force. 13 crew were killed. There were 8 survivors. |
| Takashima Maru | Japan | World War II: The cargo ship was torpedoed and sunk in the Pacific Ocean by USS Barb ( United States Navy). Survivors were rescued by Hatsuhara (Imperial Japanese Navy). |
| U-715 | Kriegsmarine | World War II: The Type VIIC submarine was depth charged and sunk in the Atlantic Ocean north east of the Faroe Islands (62°55′N 2°59′W) by a Consolidated PBY Canso aircraft of 162 Squadron, Royal Canadian Air Force with the loss of 36 of her 52 crew. |

== 14 June ==
List of shipwrecks: 14 June 1944
| Ship | State | Description |
|---|---|---|
| HMT Birdlip | Royal Navy | World War II: The Hill-class trawler (750/1005 t, 1941) was torpedoed and sunk in the Atlantic Ocean (approximately 5°N 9°W) by U-547 (Kriegsmarine) with the loss of 36 of her 51 crew. Survivors were rescued by HMT Inkpen and HMT Turcoman (both Royal Navy). |
| USS Golet | United States Navy | World War II: The Gato-class submarine was sunk in the Pacific Ocean off northern Honshu, Japan (41°04′N 141°31′E) by the guardship Miya Maru and the auxiliary submarine chaser Bunzan Maru (both Imperial Japanese Navy), and Japanese aircraft. |
| Koan Maru | Japan | World War II: The cargo ship was torpedoed and sunk in the Celebes Sea (04°33′N 122°23′E) by USS Rasher ( United States Navy). A gunner and 13 crewmen were killed. |
| M-83 | Kriegsmarine | World War II: The Type 1935 minesweeper was torpedoed and sunk in the English Channel off Auderville, Manche, France by HMS Ashanti (Royal Navy) and ORP Piorun (Polish Navy). 70 crew were killed. |
| M-343 | Kriegsmarine | World War II: The Type 1935 minesweeper was shelled and sunk off Jersey, Channel Islands. |
| R 73 | Kriegsmarine | World War II: The Type R-41 minesweeper was sunk by mines in the eastern Baltic Sea. |
| R 141 | Kriegsmarine | World War II: The Type R-130 minesweeper was bombed and sunk by aircraft west of Wesermünde. |
| R 182 | Kriegsmarine | World War II: The Type R-151 minesweeper was bombed and sunk by aircraft at Le Havre, Seine-Inférieure, France. The wreck was raised in July 1944 but was not repaired and was scuttled in the Seine near Paris on 16 August 1944. |
| Saint Basile | France | World War II: The cargo ship was torpedoed and sunk in the Atlantic Ocean (5°03′N 9°14′W) by U-547 (Kriegsmarine) with the loss of six of the 64 people on board. Survivors were rescued by HMT Inkpen and HMT Turcoman (both Royal Navy). |

== 15 June ==
List of shipwrecks: 15 June 1944
| Ship | State | Description |
|---|---|---|
| AF 60 | Kriegsmarine | World War II: The Artilleriefährprahm was bombed and sunk in a British air raid at Le Havre, Seine-Inférieure, France. |
| HMS Blackwood | Royal Navy | World War II: The Captain-class frigate (1,140/1,430 t, 1943) was torpedoed and damaged in the English Channel off Brittany, France (50°07′N 2°15′W) by U-764 (Kriegsmarine) with the loss of 58 of her 156 crew. Although taken in tow, she foundered the next day off Portland Bill, Dorset. |
| CHa-54 | Imperial Japanese Navy | World War II: The CHa-1-class auxiliary submarine chaser was sunk in the Mariana Islands by American aircraft. |
| Coburg | Germany | World War II: The cargo ship was torpedoed and sunk in the North Sea off Schiermonnikoog, Friesland, Netherlands by Bristol Beaufighter aircraft of Coastal Command, Royal Air Force. The whole crew survived with six wounded. Also reported as striking a mine and sinking. with the loss of two of her 40 crew. |
| Erlangen | Germany | World War II: The hospital ship was bombed and set afire by Allied aircraft at Sestri Levante, Liguria, Italy. She was beached. Later towed to Genoa for repair. |
| Falke | Kriegsmarine | World War II: The Type 23 torpedo boat was bombed and sunk by aircraft at Le Havre (49°30′N 00°07′E) with the loss of 26 lives. |
| Gustav Nachtigal | Kriegsmarine | World War II: The torpedo boat was torpedoed and sunk in the North Sea off Schiermonnikoog by Bristol Beaufighter aircraft of Coastal Command. Three crew were killed and seven wounded. |
| Jaguar | Kriegsmarine | World War II: The Type 24 torpedo boat was bombed and sunk by aircraft at Le Havre (49°30′N 00°07′E) with the loss of 16 lives. |
| Kanseishi Maru | Imperial Japanese Army | World War II: Convoy 3606: The cargo ship was torpedoed and sunk in the Pacific Ocean 81 nautical miles (150 km) southeast of Tori Jima (29°30′N 141°14′E) by USS Swordfish ( United States Navy). Two people were killed. |
| M-103 | Kriegsmarine | World War II: The minesweeper was sunk by gunfire and air-dropped torpedoes off De Marne, Groningen, Netherlands in an attack by Bristol Beaufighter aircraft of Coastal Command. Three crew were killed and 22 wounded. |
| M-402 | Kriegsmarine | World War II: The Type 1940 minesweeper was bombed and sunk by aircraft at Bolougne, Pas-de-Calais, France. |
| M 507 | Kriegsmarine | World War II: The Type 1916 minesweeper was bombed and sunk by Royal Air Force aircraft at Bolougne. |
| M 550 | Kriegsmarine | World War II: The Type 1915 minesweeper was bombed and sunk by aircraft at Bolougne. |
| M 3801 | Kriegsmarine | World War II: The minesweeper was bombed and sunk in a British air raid at Le Havre. |
| M 3802 | Kriegsmarine | World War II: The minesweeper was bombed and sunk by Royal Air Force aircraft off Saint-Nazaire, Loire-Inférieure, France. |
| M 3822 | Kriegsmarine | World War II: The minesweeper was bombed and sunk in a British air raid at Le Havre. |
| M 3855 | Kriegsmarine | World War II: The minesweeper was bombed and sunk in a British air raid at Le Havre. |
| M 3873 | Kriegsmarine | World War II: The minesweeper was bombed and sunk in a British air raid at Le Havre. |
| M 3874 | Kriegsmarine | World War II: The minesweeper was bombed and sunk in a British air raid at Le Havre. |
| M 4327 | Kriegsmarine | World War II: The minesweeper was bombed and sunk in a British air raid at Le Havre. |
| Ma-101 | Imperial Japanese Navy | World War II: The auxiliary net layer/minelayer, a Bar-class boom defence vessel, was shelled and sunk in Tanapag Harbor, Saipan by USS Halsey Powell ( United States Navy). Raised and repaired by Allied forces in 1944–45. Ceded to the Republic of China as a War Reparation in 1947. Captured by the Red Chinese in 1949. |
| Mamiya Maru | Imperial Japanese Navy | World War II: The Yatsushiro Maru-class naval trawler/auxiliary storeship was sunk by United States Navy carrier-based aircraft near Iwo Jima. Seven crewmen were killed. |
| HMS Mourne | Royal Navy | World War II: The River-class frigate (1,370/1,920 t, 1943) was torpedoed and sunk in the English Channel (49°35′N 5°30′W) by U-767 (Kriegsmarine) with the loss of 110 crew. |
| Möwe | Kriegsmarine | World War II: The Type 23 torpedo boat was bombed and sunk by aircraft at Le Havre, France (49°30′N 00°07′E). 12 crew were killed. |
| PA 1 | Kriegsmarine | World War II: The Flower-class corvette was bombed and sunk by aircraft at Le Havre, France. |
| PA 2 | Kriegsmarine | World War II: The Flower-class corvette was bombed and sunk by aircraft at Le Havre, France. |
| PA 3 | Kriegsmarine | World War II: The Flower-class corvette was bombed and sunk by aircraft at Le Havre, France. |
| R-51 | Kriegsmarine | World War II: The Type R-41 minesweeper was sunk by mines in the Seine. Raised and towed to Rouen, Seine-Inférieure. |
| R-92 | Kriegsmarine | World War II: The Type R-41 minesweeper was bombed and sunk by aircraft at Bolougne, France. |
| R-125 | Kriegsmarine | World War II: The Type R-41 minesweeper was rocketed and sunk by aircraft at Bolougne, France. |
| R-129 | Kriegsmarine | World War II: The Type R-41 minesweeper was bombed and sunk by aircraft at Bolougne, France. |
| R-130 | Kriegsmarine | World War II: The Type R-130 minesweeper was bombed and sunk by aircraft at Bolougne, France. |
| R 182 | Kriegsmarine | World War II: The minesweeper was bombed and sunk in a British air raid at Le Havre. |
| R-237 | Kriegsmarine | World War II: The Type R-218 minesweeper was bombed and sunk by aircraft off Bolougne, France. |
| RA 9 | Kriegsmarine | World War II: The minesweeper, a former Fairmile B motor launch, was bombed and sunk in a British air raid at Le Havre. |
| Rapido | Italy | World War II: The cargo ship struck a mine and sank 3 nautical miles (5.6 km) south of Grado. |
| Ro-44 | Imperial Japanese Navy | World War II: The Ro-35-class submarine was shelled and sunk in the Pacific Ocean off the Marshall Islands (11°13′N 164°15′E) by USS Burden R. Hastings ( United States Navy). |
| Ro-114 | Imperial Japanese Navy | World War II: The Ro-100-class submarine was depth charged and sunk in the Philippine Sea west of Tinian, Marshall Islands by USS Melvin and USS Wadleigh (both United States Navy). |
| S 66 | Kriegsmarine | World War II: The Type 1939/40 E-boat was bombed and sunk in a British air raid at Le Havre. |
| S 84 | Kriegsmarine | World War II: The Type 1939/40 E-boat was bombed and sunk in a British air raid at Le Havre. |
| S 100 | Kriegsmarine | World War II: The Type 1939/40 E-boat was bombed and sunk in a British air raid at Le Havre. |
| S 138 | Kriegsmarine | World War II: The Type 1939/40 E-boat was bombed and sunk in a British air raid at Le Havre. |
| S 142 | Kriegsmarine | World War II: The Type 1939/40 E-boat was bombed and sunk in a British air raid at Le Havre. |
| S 143 | Kriegsmarine | World War II: The Type 1939/40 E-boat was bombed and sunk in a British air raid at Le Havre. |
| S 144 | Kriegsmarine | World War II: The Type 1939/40 E-boat was bombed and sunk in a British air raid at Le Havre. |
| S 146 | Kriegsmarine | World War II: The Type 1939/40 E-boat was bombed and sunk in a British air raid at Le Havre. |
| S 150 | Kriegsmarine | World War II: The Type 1939/40 E-boat was bombed and sunk in a British air raid at Le Havre. |
| S 169 | Kriegsmarine | World War II: The Type 1939/40 E-boat was bombed and sunk in a British air raid at Le Havre. |
| S 171 | Kriegsmarine | World War II: The Type 1939/40 E-boat was bombed and sunk in a British air raid at Le Havre. |
| S 172 | Kriegsmarine | World War II: The Type 1939/40 E-boat was bombed and sunk in a British air raid at Le Havre. |
| S 173 | Kriegsmarine | World War II: The Type 1939/40 E-boat was bombed and sunk in a British air raid at Le Havre. |
| S 187 | Kriegsmarine | World War II: The Type 1939/40 E-boat was bombed and sunk in a British air raid at Le Havre. |
| S 188 | Kriegsmarine | World War II: The Type 1939/40 E-boat was bombed and sunk in a British air raid at Le Havre. |
| Shiratsuyu | Imperial Japanese Navy | The Shiratsuyu-class destroyer collided in the Philippine Sea off Mindanao, Philippines (0°09′N 126°51′E) with Seiyo Maru (Imperial Japanese Navy) and sank with the loss of 104 of her 180 crew. |
| Sonderburg | Germany | World War II: The tanker (12,246 GRT, 1910) was scuttled as a blockship at Cherbourg, Seine-Inférieure. The wreck was dispersed by explosives in January 1947. |
| T31 | Kriegsmarine | World War II: The torpedo boat was sunk in the Gulf of Finland by Soviet Navy torpedo boats. |
| TA26 | Kriegsmarine | World War II: The Ariete-class torpedo boat was torpedoed and sunk in the Mediterranean Sea by USS PT-552, USS PT-558, and USS PT-559 (all United States Navy) with the loss of 90 lives. |
| TA30 | Kriegsmarine | World War II: The Ariete-class torpedo boat was torpedoed and sunk in the Mediterranean Sea by USS PT-552, USS PT-558, and USS PT-559 (all United States Navy) with the loss of 20 lives. |
| Thames | Germany | World War II: The tug was sunk at Le Havre in and Allied air raid. |
| Trapu | Vichy France | World War II: The tug was sunk at Le Havre in and Allied air raid. |
| U-860 | Kriegsmarine | World War II: The Type IXD2 submarine was sunk in the South Atlantic south of Saint Helena (25°27′S 5°30′W) in a depth charge and rocket attack by seven Grumman TBM Avenger and Grumman F4F Wildcat aircraft based on USS Solomons (United States Navy) with the loss of 42 of her 62 crew. |
| U-987 | Kriegsmarine | World War II: The Type VIIC submarine was torpedoed and sunk in the North Sea west of Narvik, Norway (68°01′N 5°08′E) by HMS Satyr (Royal Navy) with the loss of all 53 crew. |
| V 205 Franz Westermann | Kriegsmarine | World War II: The Vorpostenboot was bombed and sunk in an Allied air raid on St. Peter Port, Guernsey, Channel Islands. |
| V 207 Heinrich Buermann | Kriegsmarine | World War II: The Vorpostenboot was bombed and sunk in a British air raid at Le Havre. |
| V 1505 Wal 8 | Kriegsmarine | World War II: The Vorpostenboot was bombed and sunk in a British air raid at Le Havre. |
| V 1506 Wal 9 | Kriegsmarine | World War II: The Vorpostenboot was bombed and sunk by aircraft off Le Havre, France. |
| V 1511 Unitas 7 | Kriegsmarine | World War II: The Vorpostenboot was bombed and sunk in a British air raid at Le Havre. |
| V 1537 | Kriegsmarine | World War II: The Vorpostenboot was bombed and sunk in a British air raid at Le Havre. |
| V 1540 | Kriegsmarine | World War II: The Vorpostenboot was bombed and sunk in a British air raid at Le Havre. |
| V 1541 | Kriegsmarine | World War II: The Vorpostenboot was bombed and sunk in a British air raid at Le Havre. |
| V 1805 Senateur Louis Brindeau | Kriegsmarine | World War II: The Vorpostenboot was bombed and sunk in a British air raid at Le Havre. |
| Von der Lippe | Kriegsmarine | World War II: The R boat tender, a former Type 1916 minesweeper, was sunk by British aircraft at Boulogne. |

== 16 June ==
List of shipwrecks: 16 June 1944
| Ship | State | Description |
|---|---|---|
| AF 3 | Kriegsmarine | World War II: The Type A Artilleriefährprahm was bombed and sunk in a British air raid at Boulogne, Pas-de-Calais, France. |
| AF 11 | Kriegsmarine | World War II: The Type C2 Artilleriefährprahm was bombed and sunk in a British air raid at Boulogne. |
| Alert | United Kingdom | World War II: The buoy tender (793 GRT, 1919) struck a mine and sank in the English Channel off the coast of Normandy, France. |
| Brommy | Kriegsmarine | World War II: The torpedo boat was bombed and sunk in a British air raid at Boulogne. |
| CHANT 69 | United Kingdom | The Channel tanker (401 GRT, 1944) capsized in the English Channel off Normandy. She was later sunk by gunfire from a Royal Navy ship. |
| Columbine | South Africa | World War II: The cargo ship (3,268 GRT, 1921) was torpedoed and sunk in the South Atlantic off Cape Town, South Africa (32°44′S 17°22′E) by U-198 (Kriegsmarine) with the loss of 23 of her 52 crew. |
| Hinode Maru | Japan | World War II: Joint convoy M-23 and M-24: The cargo ship was torpedoed and damaged off Halmahera Island (02°22′N 128°43′E) by USS Bream ( United States Navy). She lost power, drifted onto a reef the next morning and was abandoned. Three passengers, 6 gunners and 13 crewmen were killed. |
| I-6 | Imperial Japanese Navy | World War II: The I-6-class submarine was rammed, depth charged, machine gunned, and sunk in the Pacific Ocean north east of Hachijo Shima by Toyokawa Maru (Imperial Japanese Navy) when she surfaced near Japanese Convoy 3606, in a case of mistaken identity. Lost with all 104 hands. |
| HMS LCT 589 | Royal Navy | World War II: The LCT Mk 4-class landing craft tank (350/586 t, 1943) was scuttled in the Mediterranean Sea to prevent capture. |
| M 402 | Kriegsmarine | World War II: The minesweeper was bombed and sunk in a British air raid at Boulogne. |
| M 3650 | Kriegsmarine | World War II: The minesweeper was bombed and sunk in a British air raid at Boulogne. |
| M 3815 | Kriegsmarine | World War II: The minesweeper was bombed and sunk in a British air raid at Boulogne. |
| Nanshin Maru | Japan | World War II: The cargo ship was torpedoed and sunk in the Pacific Ocean south west of Tarakan, Netherlands East Indies by USS Bluefish ( United States Navy). |
| R-79 | Kriegsmarine | World War II: The Type R-41 minesweeper was bombed and sunk by aircraft at Boulogne. |
| R-81 | Kriegsmarine | World War II: The Type R-41 minesweeper was bombed and sunk by aircraft at Boulogne. |
| R 92 | Kriegsmarine | World War II: The minesweeper was bombed and sunk in a British air raid at Boulogne. |
| R 96 | Kriegsmarine | World War II: The minesweeper was bombed and severely damaged in a British air raid at Boulogne. |
| R 100 | Kriegsmarine | World War II: The minesweeper was bombed and severely damaged in a British air raid at Boulogne. |
| R 117 | Kriegsmarine | World War II: The minesweeper was bombed and severely damaged in a British air raid at Boulogne. |
| R 125 | Kriegsmarine | World War II: The minesweeper was bombed and sunk in a British air raid at Boulogne. |
| R 129 | Kriegsmarine | World War II: The minesweeper was bombed and sunk in a British air raid at Boulogne. |
| R 232 | Kriegsmarine | World War II: The minesweeper was bombed and sunk in a British air raid at Boulogne. |
| R 237 | Kriegsmarine | World War II: The minesweeper was bombed and sunk in a British air raid at Boulogne. |
| HMT Southern Pride | Royal Navy | The naval whaler (582 GRT, 1936) was wrecked near Freetown, Sierra Leone. |
| U-998 | Kriegsmarine | World War II: The Type VIIC/41 submarine was depth charged and damaged at Bergen, Norway by a de Havilland Mosquito aircraft of 333 Squadron, Royal Air Force. She was consequently withdrawn from service and scrapped. |
| V 1814 Linz | Kriegsmarine | World War II: The Vorpostenboot was bombed and sunk in a British air raid at Boulogne. |
| V 1815 Loodsboot 6 | Kriegsmarine | World War II: The Vorpostenboot was bombed and sunk in a British air raid at Boulogne. |
| Von der Groben | Kriegsmarine | World War II: The torpedo boat was bombed and sunk in a British air raid at Boulogne. |
| Von der Lippe | Kriegsmarine | World War II: The torpedo boat was bombed and sunk in a British air raid at Boulogne. |
| Yuki Maru | Imperial Japanese Army | World War II: Joint convoy M-23 and M-24: The British WWI F1 Class standard cargo ship was torpedoed, broke in two and sank off Halmahera Island (02°22′N 128°43′E) by USS Bream ( United States Navy). 18 crewmen were killed. |

== 17 June ==
List of shipwrecks: 17 June 1944
| Ship | State | Description |
|---|---|---|
| Altayskiy Komsomolets TK-35 | Soviet Navy | The G-5-class motor torpedo boat was lost on this date. |
| CHa-56 | Imperial Japanese Navy | World War II: The CHa-1-class auxiliary submarine chaser was sunk in the Mariana Islands by American aircraft. |
| Dixie | Germany | World War II: The cargo ship (1,571 or 1,610 GRT, 1937) was torpedoed and sunk in the Barents Sea off Kiberg, Norway, by Ilyushin Il-4 and Douglas A-20 Havoc aircraft of the Soviet Naval Air Force with the loss of one crew member. |
| F 542 | Kriegsmarine | World War II: Operation Brassard: The Type C Marinefährprahm was torpedoed and sunk in the Tyrrhenian Sea off Elba, Italy by United States Navy PT boats. |
| Giuliana | Germany | World War II: The coastal tanker was shelled and sunk in the Bay of Quarnaro by Le Fantasque and Le Terrible (both Free French Naval Forces). |
| Kinshu Maru | Japan | World War II: The cargo ship was torpedoed and sunk in the Pacific Ocean by USS Hake ( United States Navy). |
| USS LCI(G)-468 | United States Navy | World War II: Operation Forager: The landing craft gunboat was torpedoed and damaged in the Pacific Ocean off Saipan, Northern Mariana Islands. She was scuttled by USS Stembel ( United States Navy). |
| HMS LCI(L)-132 | Royal Navy | World War II: Operation Brassard: The landing craft infantry (large) (194/387 t, 1943) was sunk by German gunfire off Elba Island. 13 crewmen were killed. |
| M 133 | Kriegsmarine | World War II: The minesweeper was torpedoed and damaged in the English Channel off the Cotentin Peninsula, Manche, France by HMMTB 748 (Royal Navy). She was taken in to Saint-Malo, Ille-et-Vilaine. Scuttled as a blockship on 6 August. |
| M 546 | Kriegsmarine | World War II: The Type 1915 minesweeper was bombed and sunk by Canadian aircraft at Boulogne, Pas-de-Calais, France. |
| M 3238 | Kriegsmarine | World War II: The minesweeper struck a mine and sank in the North Sea off Vlissingen, Zeeland, Netherlands. |
| M 3240 | Kriegsmarine | The KFK-2-class naval drifter/minesweeper was sunk on this date. |
| M 3242 | Kriegsmarine | The KFK-2-class naval drifter/minesweeper was sunk on this date. |
| M 3243 | Kriegsmarine | The KFK-2-class naval drifter/minesweeper was sunk on this date. |
| Minyo Maru | Japan | World War II: The transport ship was bombed and sunk at Sorong, Netherlands East Indies by North American B-25 Mitchell aircraft of the United States Fifth Air Force. |
| Nipponkai Maru | Imperial Japanese Navy | World War II: The Nipponkai Maru-class auxiliary transport (a.k.a. Nihonkai Maru) was torpedoed and sunk in the Pacific Ocean 118 nautical miles (219 km; 136 mi) off Cape Augustin, Mindanao, Philippines (06°33′N 127°55′E) by USS Flounder ( United States Navy). Twenty crewmen were killed. Survivors were rescued by CHa-64 (Imperial Japanese Navy). |
| Ro-117 | Imperial Japanese Navy | World War II: The Ro-100-class submarine was bombed and sunk in the Pacific Ocean 350 nautical miles (650 km; 400 mi) south east of Saipan (11°05′N 150°31′E) by a United States Navy Consolidated PB4Y-1 Liberator aircraft of Squadron VB-109. Lost with all 55 crew. |
| Sanko Maru No. 12 | Japan | World War II: The cargo ship was bombed and sunk at Sorong by North American B-25 Mitchell aircraft of the United States Fifth Air Force. |
| Shell 4 | Finland | World War II: The ship was bombed and sunk by German aircraft near Oritsaari. |
| Shofuku Maru | Japan | World War II: The cargo ship was bombed and sunk at Sorong by North American B-25 Mitchell aircraft of the United States Fifth Air Force. |

== 18 June ==
List of shipwrecks: 18 June 1944
| Ship | State | Description |
|---|---|---|
| Albert C. Field | United Kingdom | World War II: The cargo ship (1,764 GRT, 1923) was bombed and sunk in the English Channel by Luftwaffe aircraft. |
| Bugsee | Germany | World War II: The cargo ship was sunk in an Allied air raid on Hamburg. |
| Eiko Maru | Imperial Japanese Navy | World War II: The auxiliary gunboat was sunk off Penang, Malaya by HMS Truculent (Royal Navy). |
| F 4777 | Kriegsmarine | The MZ-B landing craft was sunk on this date. |
| Henry John | Germany | World War II: The cargo ship was sunk in an Allied air raid on Hamburg. She was refloated in August 1946, repaired and entered German service as Henry Böge. |
| Hikoshima Maru | Imperial Japanese Navy | The Hikoshima Maru-class auxiliary transport ship (966 GRT 1918) ran around on a reef and was stranded off Kayangel Atoll, about 43 nautical miles (80 km; 49 mi) north north east of Koror, Palau Islands. The vessel was bombed and wrecked on 25 July 1944 by aircraft from Task Force 58 at 06°30′N 134°30′E. Twenty crewmen were killed. |
| Komsomolets Oyrotii TK-45 | Soviet Navy | The G-5-class motor torpedo boat was lost on this date. |
| USS LCI(G)-468 | United States Navy | World War II: The LCI-351-class landing craft infantry was torpedoed by Japanese aircraft 250 nautical miles (460 km) east of Guam (31°28′N 148°18′E) and was scuttled by USS Stembel ( United States Navy). 14 crewmen were killed. |
| USS PT-63 | United States Navy | The ELCO 77'-class PT boat was burned in a refueling accident at Hamburg Bay, Emirau (01°45′S 150°01′E). |
| USS PT-107 | United States Navy | The ELCO 80'-class PT boat was burned in a refueling accident at Hamburg Bay, Emirau (01°45′S 150°10′E). |
| U-767 | Kriegsmarine | World War II: The Type VIIC submarine was depth charged and sunk in the English Channel south west of Guernsey, Channel Islands (49°03′N 3°13′W) by HMS Fame, HMS Inconstant and HMS Havelock (all Royal Navy) with the loss of 49 of her 50 crew. |
| UJ 316 | Kriegsmarine | World War II: The submarine chaser struck a mine and sank in the Black Sea off Sulina, Soviet Union. |
| VMV 17 | Merivoimat | World War II: The VMV 8-class patrol craft was sunk in Tiurinsaari Island by Soviet aircraft. Six crewmen were killed. |

== 19 June ==
List of shipwrecks: 19 June 1944
| Ship | State | Description |
|---|---|---|
| USS ATR-15 | United States Navy | The ATR-1-class rescue tug was lost by grounding off Normandy, France. |
| CHANT 7 | United Kingdom | The Channel tanker (403 GRT, 1944) capsized and was driven ashore in Normandy. She was on a voyage from Thameshaven, Essex to Normandy. She was declared a constructive total loss. |
| Garoet | Netherlands | World War II: The cargo ship was torpedoed and sunk in the Indian Ocean (12°30′S 64°00′E) by U-181 (Kriegsmarine) with the loss of 88 of her 98 crew. Survivors were rescued by Nirvana ( United Kingdom) or reached land in their lifeboat. |
| I-184 | Imperial Japanese Navy | World War II: The Kaidai-class submarine was sunk in the Philippine Sea by aircraft based on USS Suwannee ( United States Navy). |
| USS LCT-209 | United States Navy | World War II: The LCT Mk 5-class landing craft tank drifted off from where she ran aground off Normandy on 10 June, drifting ashore on Fox Red Beach on 19 June 1944, or destroyed at Salerno, Italy by the explosion of Bushrod Washington (United States) on 15 September 1943 during the Battle of Salerno. |
| USS LST-523 | United States Navy | World War II: The Mk 2-class landing ship tank was sunk by a mine off Normandy (49°30′N 01°10′W). 117 of the 145 crew killed. |
| Pestel' | Soviet Union | World War II: The passenger ship was torpedoed and sunk in the Black Sea (41°03′N 39°42′E) by U-20 (Kriegsmarine) with the loss of eighteen of her 66 crew. Survivors were rescued by Soviet Navy patrol boats. |
| Ruthof | Germany | World War II: The river steam tug struck a mine and sank at km 1488 in the Danube with five dead. |
| Shōkaku | Imperial Japanese Navy | World War II: Battle of the Philippine Sea: The Shōkaku-class aircraft carrier was torpedoed and sunk in the Philippine Sea by USS Cavalla ( United States Navy) with the loss of 1,272 of her 1,842 crew. Survivors were rescued by Hatsuzuki, Urakaze, Wakatsuki and Yahagi (all Imperial Japanese Navy). |
| Taihō | Imperial Japanese Navy | World War II: Battle of the Philippine Sea: The aircraft carrier was torpedoed and sunk in the Philippine Sea by USS Albacore ( United States Navy) with the loss of 1,650 of her 2,150 crew. |
| TID 33 | United Kingdom | The TID-class tug sank at Arromanches, Calvados, France. |
| V 211 Seydlitz | Kriegsmarine | World War II: The Vorpostenboot was sunk by Allied motor torpedo boats west of Jersey, Channel Islands. |
| Westdale | United Kingdom | World War II: The coaster (424 GRT, 1911) struck a mine and sank in the English Channel off the coast of Normandy. |

== 20 June ==
List of shipwrecks: 20 June 1944
| Ship | State | Description |
|---|---|---|
| Cebre | Vichy France | World War II: The tug was torpedoed and sunk in the Mediterranean Sea off La Ciotat, Bouches-du-Rhône, France by HMS Ultor (Royal Navy). |
| DC 38 | Kriegsmarine | The KFK-2-class naval drifter was sunk on this date. |
| Gen'yō Maru | Imperial Japanese Navy | World War II: Battle of the Philippine Sea: The Itsukushima Maru-class fleet oiler was bombed and damaged in the Philippine Sea 950 nautical miles (1,760 km) east of Luzon by Douglas SBD Dauntless aircraft based on USS Wasp (United States Navy). She was scuttled by Uzuki (Imperial Japanese Navy) (15°35′N 133°30′E). |
| Grandlieu | Kriegsmarine | World War II: The transport ship was scuttled at Cherbourg, Manche, France. The wreck was removed in August 1946. |
| Hibi Maru | Imperial Japanese Army | World War II: Convoy H-29: The Daifuku Maru No. 1-class transport was torpedoed and sunk in the Saragan Strait off the south coast of Mindanao, Philippines (05°36′N 125°17′E) by USS Hake ( United States Navy). 97 troops, 4 gunners and 18 crewmen were killed. 644 survivors were rescued by Kitakami Maru (Imperial Japanese Navy). |
| Hiyō | Imperial Japanese Navy | World War II: Battle of the Philippine Sea: The Hiyō-class aircraft carrier was torpedoed and sunk in the Philippine Sea (16°20′N 132°23′E) by Grumman TBF Avenger aircraft from USS Belleau Wood ( United States Navy) with the loss of 247 of her 1,224 crew. |
| USS LCT-208 | United States Navy | The LCT Mk 5-class landing craft tank ran aground and sank off Algeria. |
| HMAS Matafele | Royal Australian Navy | The passenger-cargo ship (335 GRT, 1938) foundered during a voyage from Townsville, Australia, to Milne Bay, New Guinea, probably on this date, with the loss of all 37 people on board. |
| Otter | Kriegsmarine | World War II: The Lauting-class minelayer was bombed and sunk by Soviet aircraft at Kirkomansaari, Finland. |
| Phoenix A-7, Phoenix A-8, Phoenix A-11, Phoenix A-13, Phoenix A-14, Phoenix A-17, Phoenix A-21, Phoenix A-22, Phoenix A-24, Phoenix A-26, Phoenix A-28, Phoenix A-38, Phoenix A-45, Phoenix A-50, Phoenix A-53, Phoenix A-59, Phoenix A-61, Phoenix A-70, and Phoenix A-71 | United Kingdom | The concrete caissons for the Mulberry harbours were destroyed in a storm off Normandy. |
| Phoenix A-51 | United Kingdom | The concrete caisson for the Mulberry harbours sank in a storm off Normandy. One gunner and 12 crew were killed. |
| Seiyo Maru | Imperial Japanese Navy | World War II: Battle of the Philippine Sea: The Standard Type 1TL oiler was bombed and damaged in the Philippine Sea by Douglas SBD Dauntless, Grumman TBF Avenger and Grumman F6F Hellcat aircraft from USS Wasp ( United States Navy). She was scuttled by Yukikaze (Imperial Japanese Navy). Three crewmen were killed. |
| Shonan Maru No. 3 | Imperial Japanese Navy | World War II: The auxiliary minesweeper, acting as a guard ship for the stranded transport Hikoshima Maru (Imperial Japanese Navy) off Kayangel Atoll, about 43 nautical miles (80 km) north north east of Koror, Palau Islands, was bombed and sunk. |
| T31 | Kriegsmarine | World War II: 1st Battle of Nerva Island: The Elbing-class torpedo boat was torpedoed and sunk by TK-37 and TK-60 (both Soviet Navy), off the Koivisto Islands, Finland. 76 crewmen were killed; 8 survivors were rescued and made prisoners of war. |
| TK-94 | Soviet Navy | The G-5-class motor torpedo boat was lost on this date. |
| UJ 1209 | Kriegsmarine | World War II: The KUJ-class naval trawler/submarine chaser was torpedoed and sunk in The North Sea off Tanafjord by S-104 (Soviet Navy). 10 of her 61 crew were killed. |

== 21 June ==
List of shipwrecks: 21 June 1944
| Ship | State | Description |
|---|---|---|
| AF 32 | Kriegsmarine | World War II: The Type C Artilleriefährprahm was sunk in a Soviet air raid on Vyborg, Soviet Union. |
| Bolzano | Kriegsmarine | World War II: The inoperable Trento-class cruiser was sunk at La Spezia, Liguria by Italian commando frogmen. Refloated post-war and scrapped in 1947. |
| USCGC CG-83415 | United States Coast Guard | The 83-foot (25 m) patrol boat was wrecked at Normandy in a storm. |
| USCGC CG-83477 | United States Coast Guard | The 83-foot (25 m) patrol boat was wrecked at Normandy in a storm. |
| F 454 | Kriegsmarine | World War II: The Type C Marinefahrprahm was bombed and sunk by Martin B-26 Marauder bombers in Ancona, Italy. One crew was wounded. |
| F 4768 | Kriegsmarine | The MZ-B landing craft was sunk on this date. |
| FMa 07 | Kriegsmarine | World War II: The guard ship was sunk in the Mediterranean Sea off Marseille, Bouches-du-Rhône, France by HMS Universal (Royal Navy). |
| HMS Fury | Royal Navy | HMS Fury aground World War II: The F-class destroyer (1,405/1,940 t, 1935) struck a mine in the English Channel off Sword Beach, Normandy, France. She was taken in tow but driven ashore after the tow parted in a gale. Salvaged and towed to England. Declared a total loss and scrapped. |
| Kanan Maru | Japan | World War II: The cargo ship was torpedoed and sunk south of the Strait of Makassar by USS Bluefish ( United States Navy). |
| M 538 | Kriegsmarine | World War II: The Type 1916 minesweeper was sunk by Soviet aircraft at Viipuri, later raised and towed to Hel. |
| Memelland | Germany | World War II: The cargo ship struck a mine and sank in the Elbe. |
| No. 905 | Soviet Navy | The KM-4-class river minesweeping launch was sunk on this date. |
| PiLB 392 | Kriegsmarine | The PiLB 40 Type landing craft was lost on this date. |
| SF 284 | Kriegsmarine | World War II: The Siebel ferry was torpedoed and sunk in the Aegean Sea off Monemvasia, Greece by HMS Unsparing (Royal Navy). |
| Sybille | Germany | World War II: The barge was torpedoed and sunk in the Aegean Sea off Monemvasia by HMS Unsparing (Royal Navy). |
| UJ-2106 Tenedos | Kriegsmarine | World War II: The submarine chaser, a former Aliakon-class minelayer, was sunk by HMS Unsparing (Royal Navy) in the Mediterranean Sea south of Pelopenes. |
| TA25 | Kriegsmarine | World War II: The Cyclone-class torpedo boat was torpedoed and sunk in the Tyrrhenian Sea south of Viareggio, Italy by United States Navy PT boats with the loss of 60 lives. |
| Taisto | Merivoimat | World War II: The T-class motor torpedo boat was sunk south of Oritsaari Island by Soviet Ilyushin Il-2 aircraft. One crewman was killed, three wounded. |

== 22 June ==
List of shipwrecks: 22 June 1944
| Ship | State | Description |
|---|---|---|
| B-4 | Yugoslav Partisans | World War II: The launch was sunk by Allied gunboats. Three crew were killed. The vessel was recovered and towed to Vis for repairs on 2 July 1944. |
| Canosa | Vichy France | World War II: The blockship was torpedoed and sunk at Cassis, Bouches-du-Rhône, France by HMS Universal (Royal Navy). |
| Diamant | Kriegsmarine | World War II: The Saphir-class submarine was sunk in an American air raid on Toulon, Var, France. |
| Eurydice | Kriegsmarine | World War II: The Ariane-class submarine was sunk in an American air raid on Toulon. |
| Galatée | Kriegsmarine | World War II: The Sirène-class submarine was sunk in an American air raid on Toulon. |
| I-185 | Imperial Japanese Navy | World War II: The Kaidai-class submarine was sunk in the Pacific Ocean (15°55′N 147°09′E) by USS Chandler and USS Newcomb (both United States Navy). Lost with all 95 hands. |
| Munchen | Germany | World War II: The river steam tug struck a mine and sank at km 1105.5 in the Danube with the loss of two lives. |
| Nagaragawa Maru | Japan | World War II: The cargo ship was torpedoed and sunk in the Pacific Ocean off Kakegawa, Shizuoka, Japan (34°36′N 137°56′E) by USS Batfish ( United States Navy). |
| President Dal Piaz | Vichy France | World War II: The blockship was torpedoed and sunk at Cassis by HMS Universal (Royal Navy). |
| Sirène | Kriegsmarine | World War II: The Sirène-class submarine was sunk in an American air raid on Toulon. |
| UJ 2507 | Kriegsmarine | The KFK-2-class naval drifter/submarine chaser was sunk on this date. |

== 23 June ==
List of shipwrecks: 23 June 1944
| Ship | State | Description |
|---|---|---|
| Abba | Greece | World War II: The sailing vessel was sunk in the Aegean Sea off Antikythera by HMS Vampire (Royal Navy). |
| Belgium Maru | Imperial Japanese Army | World War II: The Daifuku Maru No. 1-class transport was torpedoed and severely damaged in the Mindoro Strait off Mindoro, Philippines (13°11′N 120°27′E) by USS Flier ( United States Navy) and beached. Later refloated and towed to Manila. She was too severely damaged to be repaired and used as a stationary anti-aircraft battery. |
| Dornia Maru | Imperial Japanese Navy | World War II: The landing craft was torpedoed and sunk off Ceram Island, Netherlands East Indies by HNLMS K XIV (Royal Netherlands Navy). |
| Empire Tristram | United Kingdom | World War II: The cargo ship was damaged by a V-1 flying bomb in the Surrey Commercial Docks, London. |
| Hydra | Germany | World War II: The supply ship was torpedoed and sunk in the English Channel off St Helier, Jersey, Channel Islands by four Royal Canadian Navy and four Royal Navy motor torpedo boats. |
| M 4624 | Kriegsmarine | World War II: The minesweeper was torpedoed and sunk in the English Channel off St Helier by four Royal Canadian Navy and four Royal Navy motor torpedo boats. |
| Nesttun | Norway | World War II: The cargo ship (1,271 GRT, 1917) struck a mine in the English Channel off Omaha Beach, Normandy, France and was consequently beached. |
| R 79 | Kriegsmarine | World War II: The minesweeper was torpedoed and sunk in the English Channel off Boulogne by Allied aircraft. |
| R 213 | Kriegsmarine | World War II: The Type R-151 minesweeper was badly damaged by a mine north of Le Havre, Seine-Inférieure, France. She was still under repairs when she was scuttled near Paris on 16 August 1944. |
| S 190 | Kriegsmarine | World War II: The torpedo boat was damaged in the English Channel in a battle with Royal Navy destroyers and was abandoned. Her crew lost one missing and three wounded. |
| HMS Scylla | Royal Navy | World War II: The Dido-class cruiser (5,582/6,975 t, 1942) struck a mine in the English Channel and was severely damaged. She was towed to Portsmouth, Hampshire, where she was declared a constructive total loss. |
| Shoun Maru | Imperial Japanese Navy | World War II: The Shoun Maru-class transport was torpedoed and sunk at Rota, Mariana Islands (14°10′N 145°10′E) by a Grumman TBF Avenger from USS Yorktown ( United States Navy). Six crewmen were killed. |
| UJ 307 | Kriegsmarine | World War II: The submarine chaser struck a mine and sank in the Black Sea off Varna, Bulgaria. |
| UJ 2306 | Kriegsmarine | World War II: The submarine chaser struck a mine and sank in the Black Sea off Varna. |

== 24 June ==
List of shipwrecks: 24 June 1944
| Ship | State | Description |
|---|---|---|
| AF 66 | Kriegsmarine | World War II: The Type B Artilleriefährprahm was torpedoed and sunk in the English Channel off Cap La Hougue, Manche, France by Royal Navy motor torpedo boats. |
| Alexander von Humboldt | Germany | World War II: The hospital ship was sunk in an Allied air raid on Wesermünde. |
| Aso Maru | Imperial Japanese Army | World War II: The Army-requisitioned Rokko Maru-class transport (3,028 GRT 1923) was torpedoed and sunk in the Philippine Sea off Leyte, Philippines by USS Redfin (United States Navy). Six crewmen and five gunners were killed. |
| DB-26 | Soviet Navy | World War II: The motorboat was shelled and sunk in the Black Sea (43°17′N 40°44′E by U-20 (Kriegsmarine). |
| Derrycunihy | United Kingdom | World War II: The cargo ship (impressed military transport MTS T72) (7,093 GRT, 1944) was sunk by a Luftwaffe acoustic mine off Sword Beach, Normandy, France with great loss of life among the troops of 43rd (Wessex) Reconnaissance Regiment in the after part waiting to disembark. The fore part was beached and unloaded. |
| Empire Lough | United Kingdom | World War II: The collier (2,824 GRT, 1940) was torpedoed and damaged in the English Channel by Kriegsmarine E-boats. She was beached at Folkestone, Kent but was declared a total loss. |
| F 553 | Kriegsmarine | The Type C Marinefahrprahm was sunk on this date. |
| Fort Norfolk | United Kingdom | World War II: The Fort ship (7,131 GRT, 1943) struck a mine and sank off Juno Beach, Calvados, France. |
| I-52 | Imperial Japanese Navy | World War II: The Type C3 submarine was depth charged and sunk in the Atlantic Ocean 800 nautical miles (1,500 km) south west of the Azores, Portugal (15°16′N 39°55′W) by a Grumman TBF Avenger aircraft based on USS Bogue (United States Navy). |
| Ilich | Soviet Union | The cargo ship capsized and sank at Portland, Oregon, United States. The wreck was subsequently broken up. |
| Kennichi Maru | Imperial Japanese Army | World War II: Convoy HO-02: The Type D Peacetime Standard cargo ship (A.K.A. Tatehi Maru) was torpedoed and sunk in the East China Sea (32°24′N 129°38′E) by USS Tang (United States Navy). Two gunners and 34 crewmen were killed. |
| Kumanosan Maru | Japan | World War II: The cargo ship was torpedoed and sunk in the Pacific Ocean south of Yokohama (34°45′N 139°30′E) by USS Grouper (United States Navy). One crewman and seven passengers were killed. |
| HMS Lord Austen | Royal Navy | World War II: The naval trawler (473 GRT, 1937) was sunk by a mine off Normandy. |
| M 3248 | Kriegsmarine | The KFK-2-class naval drifter/minesweeper was sunk on this date. |
| HMS MMS 8 | Royal Navy | World War II: The MMS-class minesweeper (255/295 t, 1941) was sunk by a mine in the English Channel. |
| Nanmei Maru No. 6 | Japan | World War II: The coastal tanker was torpedoed and sunk in the Pacific Ocean south of Yokohama by USS Greenling (United States Navy). |
| Nasusan Maru | Japan | World War II: Convoy HO-02: The emergency tanker was torpedoed and sunk in the Koshiki Straits, 40 miles south west of Nagasaki, Kyushu (32°24′N 129°38′E) by USS Tang (United States Navy). 11 crewmen were killed. |
| USS PT-193 | United States Navy | World War II: The ELCO 80'-class PT boat ran aground and was burned to avoid capture off Noemfoor, New Guinea (00°55′S 134°52′E). |
| R 141 | Kriegsmarine | World War II: The minesweeper was sunk in an Allied air raid on Wesermünde. |
| San Pedro Maru | Imperial Japanese Navy | World War II: Convoy MATA-23: The tanker was torpedoed and sunk in the South China Sea off Cape Bolinao, Luzon (16°17′N 119°41′E) by USS Jack (United States Navy). Eight crewmen, two gunners and 25 passengers were killed. Survivors were rescued by Nichizui Maru (Japan). |
| HMS Swift | Royal Navy | World War II: The S-class destroyer (1,710/2,530 t, 1943) was sunk by a mine off Sword Beach, Normandy. |
| T-7 | (Independent State of Croatia) Croatian Navy | World War II: The T-class torpedo boat was attacked by HMMGB 659 HMMGB 662 and HMMGB 670 (all Royal Navy) off Murter, Yugoslavia. She was beached on the island and burnt out. |
| Tainan Maru | Imperial Japanese Navy | World War II: Convoy HO-02: The cargo ship was torpedoed and sunk in the East China Sea (32°24′N 129°38′E) by USS Tang (United States Navy). Thirty-four crewmen and an unknown number of troops, 560 POWs, including 15 American soldiers and sailors, were killed. The Japanese Naval Whaler picks up some survivors |
| Tamahoko Maru | Imperial Japanese Army | World War II: Convoy HO-02: The Eastern Shore-class auxiliary transport was torpedoed and sunk in the East China Sea (32°24′N 129°38′E) by USS Tang (United States Navy). Two gunners, 33 crewmen and 560 Allied prisoners of war were killed. Some survivors were rescued by a Japanese naval whaler. |
| U-971 | Kriegsmarine | World War II: The Type VIIC submarine was depth charged and sunk in the English Channel north of Brest, Finistère, France (49°01′N 5°35′W) by a Consolidated B-24 Liberator aircraft of 311 Squadron, Royal Air Force and also by HMS Eskimo (Royal Navy) and HMCS Haida (Royal Canadian Navy) with the loss of one of her 52 crew. |
| U-1225 | Kriegsmarine | World War II: The Type IXC/40 submarine was depth charged and sunk in the North Sea west of Bergen, Norway (63°00′N 0°50′W) by a Consolidated Canso aircraft of 162 Squadron, Royal Canadian Air Force with the loss of all 56 crew. |
| V 205 Franz Westermann | Kriegsmarine | World War II: The Vorpostenboot was sunk in the English Channel off Guernsey, Channel Islands by Royal Air Force aircraft. |
| V 209 Dr. Rudolf Wahrendorff | Kriegsmarine | World War II: The Vorpostenboot was sunk in the English Channel off Guernsey by Royal Air Force aircraft. |

== 25 June ==
List of shipwrecks: 25 June 1944
| Ship | State | Description |
|---|---|---|
| Bison | Kriegsmarine | World War II: The Le Hardi-class destroyer was rammed and sunk at Toulon, Var, France by U-642 (Kriegsmarine). |
| Cassino | Regia Marina | World War II: The auxiliary ship was sunk by aircraft. |
| HMS Glasgow | Royal Navy | World War II: The Southampton-class cruiser was shelled and severely damaged in the English Channel by German shore-based artillery. She was under repair until August 1945. |
| HMS Goodson | Royal Navy | World War II: The Captain-class frigate (1,140/1,430 t, 1943) was torpedoed and damaged in the English Channel (50°00′N 2°49′W) by U-984 (Kriegsmarine). She was towed to Portland by HMS Bligh but was declared a total loss. Scrapped in January 1947. |
| I-42 | Soviet Navy | The KM-2-class motor launch was lost on this date. |
| No. 15 | Soviet Navy | The KM-2-class motor launch was lost on this date. |
| R-79 | Kriegsmarine | World War II: The Type R-41 minesweeper was bombed and sunk by aircraft at Boulogne, Pas-de-Calais, France. |
| T7 | (Independent State of Croatia) Croatian Navy | World War II: The torpedo boat was destroyed in action in the Adriatic Sea, off the island of Murter. |
| TA34 | Kriegsmarine | World War II: The torpedo boat was bombed and severely damaged south east of Trieste, Italy. She was declared a total loss. |
| U-269 | Kriegsmarine | World War II: The Type VIIC submarine was depth charged and sunk in the English Channel south east of Torquay, Devon, United Kingdom (50°01′N 2°59′W) by HMS Bickerton (Royal Navy) with the loss of 13 of her 52 crew. |
| Yamamiya Maru | Japan | World War II: The Type 1A Standard cargo ship was torpedoed and damaged in the Pacific Ocean north west of Halmahera, New Guinea (03°27′N 127°12′E) by USS Bashaw ( United States Navy). 42 crewmen were killed. She was taken under tow by Shinten Maru (Imperial Japanese Army) and was towed to the Talaud Islands, arriving on 29 June. She was run aground, unloaded, and abandoned. 118 survivors were rescued by Hokaze (Imperial Japanese Navy) on 5 July. Only 49 of the survivors survived the sinking of Hokaze the next day. |

== 26 June ==
List of shipwrecks: 26 June 1944
| Ship | State | Description |
|---|---|---|
| AF 85 | Kriegsmarine | World War II: The Type D Artilleriefährprahm was sunk in an Allied air raid on Weseremünde. |
| Aquileia | Kriegsmarine | World War II: The hospital ship was scuttled at Marseille, Bouches-du-Rhône, France. She was refloated later in 1944 and scrapped. |
| Gorizia | Regia Marina | World War II: The Zara-class cruiser was crippled at La Spezia, Italy by manned torpedoes. Scrapped post-1946. |
| Harugiku Maru | Imperial Japanese Navy | World War II: The cargo and passenger ship was torpedoed in the Strait of Malacca by HMS Truculent (Royal Navy). Of 1,174 prisoners of war on board, there were 1,018 survivors. |
| HMS MTB 734 | Royal Navy | World War II: The Fairmile D motor torpedo boat (102/118 t, 1943) was bombed by Allied aircraft and sunk by Allied warships off Normandy. |
| No. 705 | Soviet Navy | The R Type minesweeping boat was sunk on this date. |
| R-46 | Kriegsmarine | World War II: The Type R-41 minesweeper was sunk at Bolbec, Seine-Inférieure, France by the detonation of a boat laden with explosives that she was towing. |
| Tellaro | Italy | World War II: The cargo ship was scuttled at Livorno by the Germans. She was later refloated and scrapped. |
| U-317 | Kriegsmarine | World War II: The Type VIIC/41 submarine was depth charged and sunk in the Atlantic Ocean north east of the Shetland Islands, United Kingdom (62°03′N 1°45′E) by a Consolidated B-24 Liberator aircraft of 86 Squadron, Royal Air Force with the loss of all 50 crew. |
| U-719 | Kriegsmarine | World War II: The Type VIIC submarine was depth charged and sunk in the Atlantic Ocean north west of Ireland (55°33′N 11°02′W) by HMS Bulldog with the loss of all 52 crew. |

== 27 June ==
List of shipwrecks: 27 June 1944
| Ship | State | Description |
|---|---|---|
| Barzha No.75 | Soviet Union | World War II: The barge was torpedoed and sunk in the Black Sea off Tuapse by U-19 (Kriegsmarine). |
| Felix I | Germany | World War II: The tanker was torpedoed and sunk in the Mediterranean Sea off Nice, Alpes Maritimes, France (43°38′N 7°19′E) by HMS Ultor (Royal Navy). |
| Florianopolis | Germany | World War II: The cargo ship was bombed and set afire by Soviet Bell P-39 Airacobra, Curtis P-40 Kittyhawk and Ilyushin Il-2 aircraft and was beached off Kirkenes, Norway with 15 killed and 36 wounded aboard. She was scrapped in the United Kingdom after the war. |
| Herta | Germany | World War II: The cargo ship was attacked and set afire off Kirkenes, Norway by Soviet Bell P-39 Airacobra, Curtiss P-40 Kittyhawk and Ilyushin Il-2 aircraft, or bombed and sunk by Soviet Naval Air Force A-20 Havocs. |
| Kizugawa Maru | Imperial Japanese Navy | Kizugawa Maru World War II: The Standard Peacetime Type D transport had been torpedoed and damaged in the Pacific Ocean 7 nautical miles (13 km) east of Guam (13°16′N 145°11′E) by USS Seahorse ( United States Navy) on 8 April 1944. 37 crewmen were killed. She was towed to Guam where she was bombed and further damaged during an air raid on 11 April, and again on 11 and 27 June. Declared beyond repair after the raid on the 27 June she was scuttled by gunfire off Guam. |
| M 4620 | Kriegsmarine | World War II: The minesweeper was torpedoed and sunk in the English Channel off St Helier, Jersey, Channel Islands by Royal Navy Motor Torpedo Boats. |
| HMMTB 640 | Royal Navy | World War II: The Fairmile D motor torpedo boat (102/118 t, 1943) was mined and sunk off Vada, Italy. |
| Medan Maru | Japan | World War II: Convoy MATA-23: The Imperial Japanese Army-chartered Standard Wartime Type 1TM oiler was torpedoed and sunk in the East China Sea in the Bashi Channel (21°10′N 120°31′E) by USS Seahorse ( United States Navy). Her cargo of 8,463 tons of AvGas exploded, killing all 58 crewmen. |
| HMS Pink | Royal Navy | World War II: The Flower-class corvette (925/1,170 t, 1942) was torpedoed and damaged in the English Channel (49°48′N 0°49′W) by unknown U-boat. She was towed to Portsmouth, Hampshire but was declared a total loss. Scrapped in 1947. |
| R-114 | Kriegsmarine | World War II: The Type R-41 minesweeper was sunk by mines in the English Channel. |
| Tempo 3 | Germany | World War II: The tanker was torpedoed and sunk in the Mediterranean Sea off Nice, Alpes-Maritimes (43°34′N 7°15′E) by HMS Ultor (Royal Navy). |
| Trapez 5 | Germany | World War II: The tanker was scuttled at Marseille. She was refloated in July 1946, repaired and returned to French service as Esso Provence. |

== 28 June ==
List of shipwrecks: 28 June 1944
| Ship | State | Description |
|---|---|---|
| CD-24 | Imperial Japanese Navy | World War II: The Type D escort ship was torpedoed and sunk off Iwo Jima (24°44′N 140°20′E) by USS Archerfish ( United States Navy). |
| Charles W. Eliot | United States | World War II: The Liberty ship struck two mines in the English Channel off Omaha Beach, Normandy, France and sank. |
| Kondor | Kriegsmarine | World War II: The Type 23 torpedo boat was bombed and wrecked in dry dock at Le Havre, Seine-Inférieure, France. |
| M 4611 | Kriegsmarine | World War II: The minesweeper was sunk in the English Channel off St. Helier, Jersey, Channel Islands by HMS Eskimo (Royal Navy) and HMCS Huron (Royal Canadian Navy). 21 crew members were killed. |
| HMS Maid of Orleans | Royal Navy | World War II: Convoy FXP 18: The landing ship infantry (2,385 GRT, 1918) was torpedoed and sunk in the English Channel south east of St. Catherine's Point, Isle of Wight (50°06′N 0°41′W) by unknown U-boat with the loss of five of the 98 people on board. Survivors were rescued by HMS Eglington, HMS Hotham (both Royal Navy) and Empire Roger ( United Kingdom). |
| HMS MGB 326 | Royal Navy | World War II: The Fairmile C motor gun boat was sunk by a mine off Normandy, France. |
| Nerissa | Kriegsmarine | World War II: The cargo ship was torpedoed and sunk off Cape Romanov by TKA-239 (Soviet Navy) with the loss of 6 lives. |
| Sansei Maru | Imperial Japanese Navy | World War II: The Sansei Maru-class auxiliary collier (2,386 GRT 1936) was torpedoed and sunk in the Tsushima Strait ten nautical miles (19 km; 12 mi) off the Tsutsu Misaki south south west coast (33°53′N 128°59′E) by USS Sealion ( United States Navy) with the loss of four passengers and 22 crewmen. |
| Shotoku Maru | Imperial Japanese Navy | The auxiliary gunboat was lost on this date. |
| Ussuri Maru | Imperial Japanese Army | World War II: Convoy MATA-23: The Ussuri Maru-class auxiliary transport (a.k.a. Uslii Maru) was torpedoed and damaged in the Bashi Channel (21°10′N 120°31′E) by USS Pargo ( United States Navy) on 27 June. Bombed and sunk on 28 June south west of the Pescadore Islands (23°45′N 119°57′E) by Consolidated B-24 Liberator aircraft of the United States Fourteenth Air Force. Two crewmen were killed. |
| V 213 Claus Bolten | Kriegsmarine | World War II: The Vorpostenboot was sunk in the English Channel off St Helier, Jersey, Channel Islands by HMS Eskimo (Royal Navy) and HMCS Huron (Royal Canadian Navy). 35 crew members were killed. |
| Vulkan | Germany | World War II: The cargo ship was shelled and sunk off Petsamo, Russia. |
| Yamagiko Maru | Imperial Japanese Army | World War II: Convoy M-25: The British WWI B-class standard cargo ship (a.k.a. Yamakiko Maru and Yamagiso Maru) was torpedoed and sunk in the Moro Gulf 35 miles (56 km) east of Zamboanga (06°50′N 121°30′E) by USS Pargo ( United States Navy), killing three crewmen. |

== 29 June ==
List of shipwrecks: 29 June 1944
| Ship | State | Description |
|---|---|---|
| AF 8 | Kriegsmarine | World War II: The Type A Artilleriefährprahm was sunk in an Allied air raid at Le Tréport, Haute-Normandie, France. |
| Empire Portia | United Kingdom | World War II: Convoy FTM 22: The cargo ship (7,058 GRT) was heavily damaged, either by a mine or a torpedo fired by an unknown submarine, in the English Channel off Selsey Bill, Sussex (50°33′N 0°35′W). Five of her 47 crew were killed. She was taken in tow by HMS LST-416 (Royal Navy) and beached at Ryde, Isle of Wight, where she broke in two and was declared a total loss. |
| H. G. Blasdel | United States | World War II: Convoy ECM 17: The Liberty ship was torpedoed and damaged in the English Channel 30 nautical miles (56 km) south of St. Catherine's Point, Isle of Wight (50°07′N 0°47′W) by U-984 (Kriegsmarine) with the loss of 76 of the 508 people on board. Survivors were rescued by buoy tender, a corvette and HMS LST 326 (all Royal Navy). She was taken in tow and beached at Southampton, Hampshire. She broke in two and was declared a total loss. The wreck was scrapped in 1947. |
| James A. Farrell | United States | World War II: Convoy ECM 17: The Liberty ship was torpedoed and damaged in the English Channel 30 nautical miles (56 km) south of St. Catherine's Point (50°07′N 0°47′W) by U-984 (Kriegsmarine) with the loss of four of the 494 people on board. Survivors were rescued by HMS LST 50 (Royal Navy). She was beached at Netley, Hampshire and declared a total loss. She was scrapped in situ. |
| John A. Treutlen | United States | World War II: Convoy ECM 17: The Liberty ship (7,198 GRT), on her maiden voyage, was torpedoed and damaged in the English Channel 30 nautical miles (56 km) south of St. Catherine's Point (50°07′N 0°47′W) by U-984 (Kriegsmarine). All of her 74 crew survived the attack but one of the 12 wounded died of his wounds in July. She was beached at Southampton, and was later declared a total loss. |
| Katori Maru | Imperial Japanese Navy | World War II: The Standard Peacetime Type D Transport (1,920 GRT 1938) was torpedoed and sunk 11 nautical miles (20 km) north of Caminguin Island, Mindanao, Philippines (19°00′N 121°42′E) by USS Growler ( United States Navy). 44 crewmen were killed. |
| Libau | Sweden | World War II: The coaster struck a mine and sank in the Baltic Sea north of Kolberg, Pomerania, Germany. One crew died of his wounds. |
| Nellore | United Kingdom | World War II: The cargo ship (6,942 GRT, 1913) was torpedoed and sunk in the Indian Ocean (07°51′S 75°20′E) by I-8 (Imperial Japanese Navy). 79 passengers and crew were killed, 10 were taken prisoner, 112 were rescued by HMS Lossie (Royal Navy). 10 survivors sailed 2,500 nautical miles (4,600 km; 2,900 mi) to Sambevany, Madagascar, arriving a month later. |
| Nippo Maru | Japan | World War II: The cargo ship was torpedoed and sunk in the Pacific Ocean south east of Singapore (0°43′N 105°31′E) by USS Flasher ( United States Navy). 74 passengers and troops, two gunners, one member of convoy commander staff and 10 of the crewmen were killed. |
| Normand | France | World War II: The cargo ship was scuttled at Cherbourg, Manche. She was refloated in November 1947 and was beached in Mieilles Bay. She was declared a total loss. |
| Toyama Maru | Imperial Japanese Army | World War II: Convoy KATA-412: The Toyooka Maru-class auxiliary troopship was torpedoed, split in two and sunk off Tokunoshima, Kagoshima (27°47′N 129°05′E) by USS Sturgeon ( United States Navy). 3,627 Imperial Japanese Army troops and 76 crewmen were killed. 600 survivors were rescued by the convoy escorts. |
| Tsugaru | Imperial Japanese Navy | World War II: The Tsugaru-class minelayer was torpedoed and sunk in Cenderawasih Bay off Biak, Netherlands East Indies (2°19′N 127°57′E) by USS Darter ( United States Navy) with the loss of most of her crew. |
| U-988 | Kriegsmarine | World War II: The Type VIIC submarine was depth charged and sunk in the English Channel west of Guernsey, Channel Islands (49°37′N 3°41′W) by a Consolidated B-24 Liberator aircraft of 244 Squadron, Royal Air Force and also by HMS Cooke, HMS Domett, HMS Duckworth and HMS Essington (all Royal Navy) with the loss of all 50 crew. |
| USS Valor | United States Navy | The Accentor-class minesweeper was in collision with USS Richard W. Suesens ( United States Navy) in Buzzards Bay off Mishaum Point, Massachusetts (41°28′N 70°57′W) and sank with the loss of seven of her fourteen crew. |

== 30 June ==
List of shipwrecks: 30 June 1944
| Ship | State | Description |
|---|---|---|
| Empire Portia | United Kingdom | World War II: The cargo ship struck a mine and was damaged in the English Channel off Selsey Bill, Sussex. She was taken in tow by USS LST-416 (United States Navy). The ship was beached north of Ryde Pier, Isle of Wight the next day but her back broke on 4 July and she was declared a total loss. The stern section was salvaged in September 1944, the bow section in April 1945 and scrapped. |
| Hyakufuku Maru | Imperial Japanese Navy | World War II: Convoy 3622: The Hyakufuku Maru-class auxiliary transport ship was torpedoed and sunk in the Pacific Ocean 43 miles (69 km) north west of Chichi Jima (28°20′N 141°23′E) by USS Plaice (United States Navy) with the loss of 16 crewmen. Survivors were rescued by the netlayer Kogi Maru (Imperial Japanese Navy). |
| Matsukawa Maru | Imperial Japanese Army | World War II: Convoy SAMA-08: The Shunko Maru-class auxiliary transport (3,825 GRT 1936) (a.k.a. Matsugawa Maru, and transported prisoners of war as Cho Saki Maru) was torpedoed and sunk in the South China Sea off Manila Bay (14°25′N 119°45′E) by USS Jack (United States Navy). Two crewmen, five gunners, fifteen soldiers and nine passengers were killed. |
| Nikkin Maru | Imperial Japanese Army | World War II: The Nikkin Maru-class auxiliary cargo ship was torpedoed and sunk in the Yellow Sea (35°05′N 125°00′E) by USS Tang ( United States Navy) with the loss of approximately 3,400 troops and all the crew. |
| SF 282 | Kriegsmarine | World War II: The Siebel ferry was sunk on this date. |
| TK-43, TK-63 and TK-161 | Soviet Navy | World War II: The motor torpedo boats were sunk in the Baltic Sea by German minesweepers. |
| Trinchen Behrens | Germany | World War II: The cargo ship struck a mine and sank in the Jade Bight. |
| Turusima Maru | Japan | World War II: Convoy SAMA-08: The tanker was torpedoed and sunk in the South China Sea (14°15′N 119°40′E) by USS Jack (United States Navy). 44 crewmen, 18 gunners and 15 passengers were killed. |
| U-478 | Kriegsmarine | World War II: The Type VIIC submarine was depth charged and sunk in the Atlantic Ocean north east of the Faroe Islands (63°27′N 0°50′W) by a Consolidated PBY Canso aircraft of 162 Squadron, Royal Canadian Air Force and a Consolidated B-24 Liberator aircraft of 86 Squadron, Royal Air Force with the loss of all 52 crew. |
| UJ 1408 | Kriegsmarine | World War II: The MOB-FD-class submarine chaser was sunk in the Bay of Biscay off Concarneau, Finistère, France by Allied de Havilland Mosquito aircraft. |
| V 422 Kergroise | Kriegsmarine | World War II: The Vorpostenboot was sunk at Lorient by Allied aircraft. |
| Vera Radcliffe | United Kingdom | World War II: The cargo ship was sunk as a breakwater off Juno Beach, Courseulles, Calvados, France. |

== Unknown date ==
List of shipwrecks: Unknown date 1944
| Ship | State | Description |
|---|---|---|
| Bosna | Croatian Navy | World War II: The river monitor struck a mine in the Una and sank. |
| Empire Tamar | United Kingdom | World War II: The cargo ship (6,581 GRT, 1907) was sunk as part of Gooseberry 5, Sword Beach, Ouistreham, Calvados, France. |
| Empire Tana | United Kingdom | World War II: The cargo ship (6,148 GRT, 1923) was sunk as part of Gooseberry 5. |
| Egypte | Vichy France | World War II: The cargo ship was lost in June. |
| F 504 | Kriegsmarine | World War II: The Type C Marinefahrprahm was sunk sometime in June. |
| Inverlane | United Kingdom | World War II: The bow section of the tanker was scuttled as a blockship in Scapa Flow. |
| HMS LCA 171, HMS LCA 208, HMS LCA 208, HMS LCA 279, HMS LCA 289, HMS LCA 303, HMS LCA 320, HMS LCA 337, HMS LCA 339, HMS LCA 341, HMS LCA 349, HMS LCA 350, HMS LCA 352, HMS LCA 360, HMS LCA 367, HMS LCA 383, HMS LCA 387, HMS LCA 401, HMS LCA 409, HMS LCA 418, HMS LCA 424, HMS LCA 431, HMS LCA 434, HMS LCA 442, HMS LCA 458, HMS LCA 462, HMS LCA 463, HMS LCA 476, HMS LCA 485, HMS LCA 494, HMS LCA 496, HMS LCA 503, HMS LCA 509, HMS LCA 518, HMS LCA 519, HMS LCA 520, HMS LCA 522, HMS LCA 525, HMS LCA 530, HMS LCA 535, HMS LCA 540, HMS LCA 566, HMS LCA 579, HMS LCA 581, HMS LCA 584, HMS LCA 586, HMS LCA 588, HMS LCA 589, HMS LCA 590, HMS LCA 592, HMS LCA 593, HMS LCA 594, HMS LCA 611, HMS LCA 613, HMS LCA 623, HMS LCA 637, HMS LCA 642, HMS LCA 649, HMS LCA 650, HMS LCA 651, HMS LCA 652, HMS LCA 655, HMS LCA 661, HMS LCA 664, HMS LCA 665, HMS LCA(HR) 671, HMS LCA(HR) 672, HMS LCA(HR) 673, HMS LCA 683, HMS LCA(HR) 690, HMS LCA 691, HMS LCA 692, HMS LCA 704, HMS LCA 705, HMS LCA 710, HMS LCA 713, HMS LCA 717, HMS LCA 721, HMS LCA 729, HMS LCA 731, HMS LCA 738, HMS LCA 748, HMS LCA 750, HMS LCA 768, HMS LCA 775, HMS LCA 779, HMS LCA 780, HMS LCA 788, HMS LCA 791, HMS LCA 791, HMS LCA 792, HMS LCA 795, HMS LCA 796, HMS LCA 797, HMS LCA 803, HMS LCA 808, HMS LCA 809, HMS LCA 810, HMS LCA 812, HMS LCA 814, HMS LCA 815, HMS LCA 821, HMS LCA 825, HMS LCA 827, HMS LCA 835, HMS LCA 849, HMS LCA 853, HMS LCA 857, HMS LCA 859, HMS LCA 860, HMS LCA 867, HMS LCA 869, HMS LCA 870, HMS LCA 871, HMS LCA 879, HMS LCA 881, HMS LCA 886, HMS LCA 900, HMS LCA 903, HMS LCA 911, HMS LCA 913, HMS LCA 914, HMS LCA 918, HMS LCA 919, HMS LCA 920, HMS LCA 929, HMS LCA 933, HMS LCA 946, HMS LCA 949, HMS LCA 958, HMS LCA(HR) 965, HMS LCA 978, HMS LCA 984, HMS LCA 998, HMS LCA 999, HMS LCA 1000, HMS LCA 1005, HMS LCA 1008, HMS LCA 1013, HMS LCA 1016, HMS LCA 1021, HMS LCA 1024, HMS LCA 1026, HMS LCA 1027, HMS LCA 1028, HMS LCA 1034, HMS LCA 1050, HMS LCA 1057, HMS LCA 1058, HMS LCA 1059, HMS LCA 1063, HMS LCA 1068, HMS LCA 1069, HMS LCA 1074, HMS LCA 1082, HMS LCA 1086, HMS LCA 1088, HMS LCA 1091, HMS LCA 1093, HMS LCA 1096, HMS LCA 1129, HMS LCA 1131, HMS LCA 1131, HMS LCA 1132, HMS LCA 1137, HMS LCA 1138, HMS LCA 1143, HMS LCA 1144, HMS LCA 1146, HMS LCA 1149, HMS LCA 1150, HMS LCA 1151, HMS LCA 1155, HMS LCA 1156, HMS LCA 1213, HMS LCA 1215, HMS LCA 1216, HMS LCA 1251, HMS LCA 1252, HMS LCA 1253, HMS LCA 1256, HMS LCA 1338, HMS LCA 1339, HMS LCA 1340, HMS LCA 1341, HMS LCA 1343, HMS LCA 1372, HMS LCA 1379, HMS LCA 1381, HMS LCA 1382, HMS LCA 1383 | Royal Navy | World War II: The landing craft assaults were lost sometime in June or July. |
| HMS LCI(S)-2512, HMS LCI(S)-2517, HMS LCI(S)-2524, HMS LCI(S)-2531, HMS LCI(S)-2537, and HMS LCI(S)-2540 | Royal Navy | World War II: The landing craft infantry (small)s were lost off Normandy. |
| HMS LCM 127, HMS LCM 128, HMS LCM 165, HMS LCM 168, HMS LCM 180, HMS LCM 191, HMS LCM 203, HMS LCM 216, HMS LCM 226, HMS LCM 229, HMS LCM 231, HMS LCM 241, HMS LCM 251, HMS LCM 281, HMS LCM 316, HMS LCM 319, HMS LCM 330, HMS LCM 335, HMS LCM 337, HMS LCM 377, HMS LCM 382, HMS LCM 383, HMS LCM 408, HMS LCM 409, HMS LCM 419, HMS LCM 421, HMS LCM 425, HMS LCM 443, HMS LCM 444, HMS LCM 466, HMS LCM 531, HMS LCM 535, HMS LCM 568, HMS LCM 587, HMS LCM 627, HMS LCM 628, HMS LCM 631, HMS LCM 641, HMS LCM 908, HMS LCM 929, HMS LCM 1053, HMS LCM 1059, HMS LCM 1062, HMS LCM 1088, HMS LCM 1098, HMS LCM 1108, HMS LCM 1120, HMS LCM 1127, HMS LCM 1128, HMS LCM 1139, HMS LCM 1145, HMS LCM 1146, HMS LCM 1161, HMS LCM 1175, HMS LCM 1189, HMS LCM 1197, HMS LCM 1200, HMS LCM 1207, HMS LCM 1208, HMS LCM 1212, HMS LCM 1220, HMS LCM 1221, HMS LCM 1227, HMS LCM 1232, HMS LCM 1233, HMS LCM 1240, HMS LCM 1244, HMS LCM 1278, HMS LCM 1282, HMS LCM 1293, HMS LCM 1297, HMS LCM 1397 | Royal Navy | World War II: The landing craft mediums were lost sometime in June or July. |
| HMS LCP(L) 21, HMS LCP(L) 22, HMS LCP(L) 23, HMS LCP(L) 40, HMS LCP(L) 51, HMS LCP(L) 121, HMS LCP(L) 132, HMS LCP(L) 139, HMS LCP(L) 170, HMS LCP(L) 175, HMS LCP(L) 176, HMS LCP(L) 187, HMS LCP(L) 189, HMS LCP(L) 197, HMS LCP(L) 199, HMS LCP(L) 208, HMS LCP(L) 272, HMS LCP(L) 280, HMS LCP(L) 282, HMS LCP(L) 285, HMS LCP(L) 286, HMS LCP(L) 289, HMS LCP(L) 309, HMS LCP(L) 312, HMS LCP(L) 528, HMS LCP(L) 556 | Royal Navy | World War II: The landing craft personnel (large)s were lost sometime in June or July. |
| USS LCT-147 | United States Navy | World War II: The landing craft tank ran aground and sank in the English Channel off Juno Beach, Corsuelles, Calvados. |
| USS LCT-200 | United States Navy | World War II: The landing craft tank was lost in the English Channel off Juno Beach. Cause unknown. |
| USS LCT-244 | United States Navy | World War II: The landing craft tank was lost in the English Channel off Juno Beach. Cause unknown. |
| USS LCT-273 | United States Navy | World War II: The landing craft tank was lost off Normandy. |
| USS LCT-413 | United States Navy | World War II: The landing craft tank was lost in the English Channel off Juno Beach. Cause unknown. |
| USS LCT-301 | United States Navy | World War II: The landing craft tank was lost off Normandy. |
| USS LCT-307 | United States Navy | World War II: The landing craft tank was lost off Normandy. |
| USS LCT-402 | United States Navy | World War II: The landing craft tank was lost off Normandy. |
| USS LCT-419 | United States Navy | World War II: The landing craft tank was lost off Normandy. |
| USS LCT-498 | United States Navy | World War II: The landing craft tank was lost off Normandy. |
| HMS LCT 524 | Royal Navy | World War II: The landing craft tank was lost off Normandy. |
| USS LCT-572 | United States Navy | World War II: The landing craft tank struck a mine and sank in the English Channel off Juno Beach. |
| USS LCT-713 | United States Navy | World War II: The landing craft tank struck a mine and sank in the English Channel off Juno Beach. |
| HMS LCT 715 | Royal Navy | World War II: The landing craft tank was lost off Normandy. |
| HMS LCT 750 | Royal Navy | World War II: The landing craft tank was lost off Normandy. |
| HMS LCT 809 | Royal Navy | World War II: The landing craft tank was lost off Normandy. |
| HMS LCT 947 | Royal Navy | World War II: The landing craft tank was lost off Normandy. |
| USS LCT-7143 | United States Navy | World War II: The landing craft tank struck a mine and sank in the English Channel off Juno Beach. |
| HMS LCV 919 | Royal Navy | World War II: The landing craft vehicle was lost sometime in June. |
| HMS LCVP 1016, HMS LCVP 1029, HMS LCVP 1031, HMS LCVP 1033, HMS LCVP 1044, HMS LCVP 1045, HMS LCVP 1046, HMS LCVP 1049, HMS LCVP 1054, HMS LCVP 1056, HMS LCVP 1062, HMS LCVP 1065, HMS LCVP 1084, HMS LCVP 1088, HMS LCVP 1093, HMS LCVP 1098, HMS LCVP 1101, HMS LCVP 11102, HMS LCVP 1104, HMS LCVP 1106, HMS LCVP 1111, HMS LCVP 1114, HMS LCVP 1117, HMS LCVP 1120, HMS LCVP 121, HMS LCVP 1122, HMS LCVP 1124, HMS LCVP 1132, HMS LCVP 1133, HMS LCVP 11139, HMS LCVP 1146, HMS LCVP 1153, HMS LCVP 1155, HMS LCVP 1157, HMS LCVP 1159, HMS LCVP 1165, HMS LCVP 1170, HMS LCVP 1171, HMS LCVP 1172, HMS LCVP 1184, HMS LCVP 1188, HMS LCVP 1201, HMS LCVP 1204, HMS LCVP 1211, HMS LCVP 1216, HMS LCVP 1218, HMS LCVP 1242, HMS LCVP 1245, HMS LCVP 1246, HMS LCVP 1248, HMS LCVP 1249, HMS LCVP 1251, HMS LCVP 1255, HMS LCVP 1260, HMS LCVP 1262, HMS LCVP 1264 | Royal Navy | World War II:The landing craft, vehicles and personnel were lost sometime in June. |
| Panos | United Kingdom | World War II: The cargo ship was sunk as a blockship off Juno Beach. |
| Rheinpfalz | Kriegsmarine | World War II: The incomplete auxiliary supply vessel was scuttled at Dunkerque, Nord. She was refloated post-war, repaired and entered French service in 1949 as La Saône. |
| Shoan Maru | Imperial Japanese Navy | World War II: The Kaiko Maru-class transport was torpedoed and damaged by USS Whale ( United States Navy) on 27 January 1943. She spent the next year being repaired when she was damaged again by bombing 14 January 1944, and bombed and damaged beyond repair by aircraft from USS Essex and USS Yorktown ( United States Navy) on 23 February 1944 and abandoned. Either sank at this time or during the June 1944 Battle of Saipan. |
| Shosei Maru | Imperial Japanese Navy | World War II: Battle of Saipan:The Shosei Maru-class auxiliary transport (998 GRT 1929) was sunk, probably either bombed by US Navy aircraft, or shelled and sunk by US Navy ships, in Tanapag Harbour, Saipan sometime in June, though there is a probably inaccurate claim by USS Silversides ( United States Navy) on 20 June off Saipan. |
| Stormarn | France | World War II: The incomplete auxiliary supply ship was scuttled at Dunkerque. She was refloated post-war, repaired and entered French service in 1949 as La Seine. |
| U-740 | Kriegsmarine | World War II: The German Type VII submarine was lost on patrol in the English Channel on or after 6 June with the loss of all 51 crew. |
| U-1191 | Kriegsmarine | World War II: The Type VIIC submarine was lost on patrol in the English Channel on or after 12 June with the loss of all 50 crew. |
| Virgilio | Germany | World War II: The troopship was scuttled at Toulon, Var. |
| Unknown sub and Unknown sub | Imperial Japanese Navy | World War II: Battle of Saipan:The midget submarines were destroyed by their crews sometime between 12 June and 8 July 1944. All crew killed during the battle, probably fighting as infantry. |
