= 62nd Armored Field Artillery Battalion =

- Active: 1942–1945
- Country: United States
- Branch: United States Army
- Type: Field artillery
- Engagements: World War II: North African Campaign; Invasion of Sicily; Operation Neptune; Battle of Elsenborn Ridge

The 62nd Armored Field Artillery Battalion was formed in 1942 at Fort Bliss, Texas. The 62nd served in the campaigns in North Africa, Sicily, and Europe. They received a unit citation for their activities on D-Day at Omaha Beach. Elements of the unit were transported ashore by USS LCT-209. On 17 December 1944 the 62nd Armored Field Artillery Battalion destroyed a column of roughly 40 German tanks and support vehicles at the Battle of Elsenborn Ridge.
