= HM LST-416 =

1942 LST-1-class tank landing ship

History

United Kingdom
- Name: LST-416
- Ordered: as a Type S3-M-K2 hull, MCE hull 936
- Builder: Bethlehem-Fairfield Shipyard, Baltimore, Maryland
- Yard number: 2188
- Laid down: 25 October 1942
- Launched: 30 November 1942
- Commissioned: 3 February 1943
- Decommissioned: 12 February 1946
- Identification: Hull symbol: LST-416
- Fate: Returned to US, 12 February 1946

United States
- Name: LST-416
- Acquired: 12 February 1946
- Stricken: 5 June 1946
- Fate: Sold for conversion to merchant service, 23 April 1948

General characteristics
- Class & type: LST-1-class tank landing ship
- Displacement: 1,625 long tons (1,651 t) (light); 4,080 long tons (4,145 t) (full (seagoing draft with 1,675 short tons (1,520 t) load); 2,366 long tons (2,404 t) (beaching)
- Length: 328 ft (100 m) oa
- Beam: 50 ft (15 m)
- Draft: Unloaded: 2 ft 4 in (0.71 m) forward; 7 ft 6 in (2.29 m) aft; Full load: 8 ft 2 in (2.49 m) forward; 14 ft 1 in (4.29 m) aft; Landing with 500 short tons (450 t) load: 3 ft 11 in (1.19 m) forward; 9 ft 10 in (3.00 m) aft
- Installed power: 2 × 900 hp (670 kW) Electro-Motive Diesel 12-567A diesel engines; 1,700 shp (1,300 kW)
- Propulsion: 1 × Falk main reduction gears; 2 × Propellers
- Speed: 12 kn (22 km/h; 14 mph)
- Range: 24,000 nmi (44,000 km; 28,000 mi) at 9 kn (17 km/h; 10 mph) while displacing 3,960 long tons (4,024 t)
- Boats & landing craft carried: 2 x LCVPs
- Capacity: 1,600–1,900 short tons (3,200,000–3,800,000 lb; 1,500,000–1,700,000 kg) cargo depending on mission
- Troops: 163
- Complement: 117
- Armament: Varied, ultimate armament; 1 × QF 12-pounder 12 cwt naval gun; 6 × 20 mm (0.79 in) Oerlikon cannon; 4 × Fast Aerial Mine (FAM) mounts

HMS LST-416 was as a Landing Ship, Tank Mk.2 of the Royal Navy during World War II. Built as a LST-1-class tank landing ship for the United States Navy, it was transferred to the British in 1943 and returned to US in 1946.

== Construction ==
LST-416 was laid down on 25 October 1942, under Maritime Commission (MARCOM) contract, MC hull 936, by the Bethlehem-Fairfield Shipyard, Baltimore, Maryland; launched 30 November 1942; then transferred to the United Kingdom and commissioned on 3 February 1943.

== Service history ==
LST-416 saw no active service in the United States Navy. She was decommissioned and returned to United States Navy custody on 12 February 1946, and struck from the Naval Vessel Register on 5 June 1946. On 23 April 1948, LST-416 was sold to the Newport News Shipbuilding & Drydock Co., Newport News, Virginia, for conversion to merchant service.

== See also ==
- List of United States Navy LSTs

== Notes ==
Citations

== Bibliography ==
Online resources

- "LST-416". Dictionary of American Naval Fighting Ships. Naval History and Heritage Command. This article incorporates text from this source, which is in the public domain.
- "Bethlehem-Fairfield, Baltimore MD". www.ShipbuildingHistory.com. 14 August 2008.
- "USS LST-416". NavSource. 16 May 2014.
