= Tamahoko Maru =

Japanese passenger-cargo ship

History

Empire of Japan
- Name: Tamahoko Maru
- Owner: Kaiyo Kisen K. K.
- Builder: Harima Dock Company
- Launched: 1919
- Completed: March 1919
- In service: 1919
- Out of service: 1944
- Fate: Sunk, 24 June 1944

General characteristics
- Type: Passenger-cargo ship
- Tonnage: 6,780 tons
- Length: 129.5 m (424 ft 10 in)
- Beam: 17.7 m (58 ft 1 in)
- Draught: 8.84 m (29 ft 0 in)
- Speed: 13.2 knots (24.4 km/h; 15.2 mph)

SS Tamahoko Maru was a Japanese passenger-cargo ship, used as a hell ship, which was torpedoed by submarine USS Tang on 24 June 1944, carrying 772 Allied prisoners of war of which 560 died.

== Service history ==
Tamahoko Maru sailed on 20 June 1944 with 772 prisoners of war (POWs) (197 British, 42 American, 258 Australian and 281 Dutch) from Takao for Moji in convoy HO-02. There were also some 500 Japanese soldiers on board. On 24 June 1944 at 11:50 pm, in the Koshiki Straits 40 miles (64 km) southwest of Nagasaki, Tamahoko Maru was torpedoed by USS Tang and sank in less than two minutes at 32°24′N 129°38′E.

An escort picked up the Japanese survivors and left the POWs in the water, to be picked up the next morning by a small whaling ship, which brought 212 survivors to Nagasaki. They spent the rest of the war in the Fukuoka 14 prison camp. The other 560 POWs, 35 crewmen and an unknown number of Japanese soldiers were lost.
