= HMS Unsparing =

Submarine of the Royal Navy

History

United Kingdom
- Name: HMS Unsparing
- Builder: Vickers-Armstrongs, Newcastle upon Tyne
- Laid down: 11 August 1941
- Launched: 28 July 1942
- Commissioned: 29 November 1942
- Fate: Scrapped 1946
- Badge

General characteristics
- Class & type: U-class submarine
- Displacement: Surfaced - 540 tons standard, 630 tons full load; Submerged - 730 tons
- Length: 58.22 m (191 ft)
- Beam: 4.90 m (16 ft 1 in)
- Draught: 4.62 m (15 ft 2 in)
- Propulsion: 2 shaft diesel-electric; 2 Paxman Ricardo diesel generators + electric motors; 615 / 825 hp
- Speed: 11.25 knots (20.8 km/h) max surfaced; 10 knots (19 km/h) max submerged
- Complement: 27-31
- Armament: 4 bow internal 21 inch (533 mm) torpedo tubes - 8 - 10 torpedoes; 1 - 3-inch (76 mm) gun

HMS Unsparing (P55) was a Royal Navy U-class submarine built by Vickers-Armstrongs. So far she has been the only ship of the Royal Navy to bear the name Unsparing.

== Career ==
Unsparing spent most of her wartime career in the Mediterranean, where she sank the Italian tanker Flegetonte, the German merchant Ingeborg (the former French Ste. Martine), the German submarine chaser UJ 2106 (the former Greek minelayer Tenedos), the German barge Sybille (the former French Caisson) and the German ferry SF 284, as well as six sailing vessels, including the Greek Evangelistria. She also torpedoed and damaged the German merchant Peter, as well as a number of sailing vessels.

Unsparing survived the war and was scrapped at Thos. W. Ward Inverkeithing in 1946.
