= USS LCT-209 =

History

United States
- Name: USS LCT-209
- Builder: Bison Ship Building Corporation
- Laid down: September 1942
- Launched: October 1942
- Stricken: 11 December 1944
- Fate: Grounded off Normandy and destroyed

General characteristics
- Class & type: LCT (Mark V)
- Displacement: 286 short tons
- Length: 114 ft 2 in (34.80 m)
- Beam: 32 ft 8 in (9.96 m)
- Draft: 3 ft (0.9 m)
- Propulsion: 3 × Grey Marine Diesels, 3 propellers, 675 shp/shaft
- Speed: 10 knots (19 km/h)
- Range: 700 nmi @ 7 knots; (1,300 km @ 13 km/h)
- Capacity: Cargo, 150 short tons
- Complement: 13
- Armament: 1 × 20 mm AA guns; 2 × M2 Browning machine guns
- Armor: 2.5 inches (6.4 cm), wheelhouse; 2 inches (5.1 cm), gun shield

USS LCT-209 was a Landing Craft Tank Mk V built by Bison Shipbuilding of Buffalo NY. The keel was laid in September 1942 and the vessel was launched in October 1942.

LCT-209 was deployed to the Mediterranean Theater of Operations and participated in the landings at Sicily in July 1943 and Salerno, Italy in September 1943.

LCT-209 served as part of Force O-2 at Fox Green sector of Omaha Beach, Normandy, on D-Day, 6 June 1944.

The following is from an action report for that day, supplemented by personal recollections and a history of the 62nd Armored Field Artillery Battalion:

Three officers and 39 enlisted men of the 62nd Armored Field Artillery Battalion with 1st Lieutenant Raymond D. French in command boarded at 1145 on 1 June 1944. Sailed from Isle of Portland at 1430 on 5 June 1944. Scheduled to land at Fox Green sector of Omaha Beach at H+90 after firing artillery from 8000 yards off Colleville-sur-Mer in support of the 16th Regimental Combat Team, 1st Infantry Division prior to H hour. Commenced firing 105mm howitzers at 0600.

The landing attempt at 0800 was repelled by enemy fire. The vessel was hit by enemy fire while approaching the beach again at 0940 and retracted with one wounded by shrapnel. The vessel then stood by for an opportunity to beach until 1655. All vehicles and Army personnel landed at 1705. Vessel was also employed removing casualties from the beach.

According to the action report, on D+1 at 1947, LCT-209 towed USS LCT-460 to the beach, assisted in beaching at 2008, retracting, and towing LCT-460 to the LST area. The report continues for four pages through 19 June 1944.

LCT-209 was commanded by A. Hayes. Serving aboard was Navy Ensign Thomas F. O'Shaughnessy Jr. Subsequent reports have LCT-209 lost, grounding, 10 June her hull being opened and engine room flooded. On 19 July 1944 she drifted ashore on Fox Red Beach shore. She was pulled off by USS Bannock (ATF-81) and beached again on Easy White Beach. Pulled off later that day by USS Diver (ARS-3). Reported repaired and operational on 26 June according to an endorsement to her action report. She was towed to Dartmouth, England, arriving 7 September. Apparently declared beyond repair and is reported stricken from the Navy Register on 11 December 1944 and scrapped.

Another history, The Official Chronology of the U.S. Navy in World War II, lists LCT-209 as destroyed at Salerno, Italy by the explosion of Bushrod Washington (United States) on 15 September 1943 during the Battle of Salerno.

LCT-209 was awarded three battle stars (Sicily, Salerno and Normandy) for her service in World War II.
