= List of shipwrecks in February 1944 =

The list of shipwrecks in February 1944 includes ships sunk, foundered, grounded, or otherwise lost during February 1944.

== 1 February ==
List of shipwrecks: 1 February 1944
Ship	State	Description
Agia Paraskevi	Greece	World War II: The sailing ship (80 GRT) was rammed and sunk in the Mediterranean Sea 12 nautical miles (22 km) north east of Soueida, Syria by U-453 (Kriegsmarine). There were no casualties.
Edward Bates	United States	World War II: The Liberty ship was torpedoed and damaged in the Mediterranean Sea off Ténès, Algeria (36°38′N 0°50′E) by Luftwaffe aircraft. She was taken in tow but later sank. One crew was killed. There were 90 survivors.
Himli	Lebanon	World War II: The sailing ship (67 GRT) was rammed and sunk in the Mediterranean Sea 8 nautical miles (15 km) off Soueida by U-453 (Kriegsmarine). All crew survived.
I-171	Imperial Japanese Navy	World War II: The Kaidai-class submarine was depth charged and sunk in the Pacific Ocean off Green Island, New Guinea (05°37′S 154°14′E) by USS Guest and USS Hudson (both United States Navy) with the loss of all 91 crew.
Nanka Maru	Japan	World War II: Convoy A: The transport was torpedoed and sunk near Halmahera, Maluku Islands by USS Hake (United States Navy). 258 Formosa Giyu Corps troops, six crewmen and one gunner died.
Ro-39	Imperial Japanese Navy	World War II: The Kaichū type submarine was depth charged and sunk in the Pacific Ocean off Wotje(09°24′N 170°32′E) by USS Walker (United States Navy) with the loss of all 70 hands.
Salem	Lebanon	World War II: The sailing ship (81 GRT) was rammed and sunk in the Mediterranean Sea 30 nautical miles (56 km; 35 mi) off Soueida by U-453 (Kriegsmarine). All crew survived.
Tacoma Maru	Imperial Japanese Army	World War II: Convoy A: The Tacoma Maru-class transport was torpedoed and sunk near Halmahera (1°35′N 128°58′E) by USS Hake (United States Navy). Two crewmen were killed.
Toei Maru	Imperial Japanese Navy	World War II: Convoy SO-805: The Toei Maru-class transport (4,004 GRT 1937) was torpedoed and sunk in the Pacific Ocean off Palau (04°24′S 143°15′E) by USS Seahorse (United States Navy). Fifty-six crewmen were killed.
UJ 1702	Kriegsmarine	World War II: The MOB-FD-class naval trawler/submarine chaser was bombed and sunk in the North Sea west of Stadlandet, Norway by British aircraft.
UJ 2124 Elaki	Kriegsmarine	World War II: The auxiliary submarine chaser was sunk west of Leros, Greece by North American B-25G Mitchell aircraft of the United States' 379th Bombardment Squadron, 310th Bombardment Group. Three crew were killed. 18 survivors (4 seriously injured and 3 lightly wounded) were rescued by UJ 2151 and UJ 2153 (both Kriegsmarine).
Umikaze	Imperial Japanese Navy	World War II: The Shiratsuyu-class destroyer was torpedoed and sunk in the Pacific Ocean off Truk, South Seas Mandate by USS Guardfish (United States Navy) with the loss of 50 of her 265 crew.
Valencia	Germany	World War II: The cargo ship was bombed and severely damaged off Stadlandet by British aircraft. She was declared a total loss. She was repaired post-war, and entered Norwegian service in 1948 as Skottland.

== 2 February ==
List of shipwrecks: 2 February 1944
Ship	State	Description
Charlotte Schliemann	Kriegsmarine	World War II: The supply ship was scuttled in the Indian Ocean (23°23′S 74°37′E) to avoid capture by HMS Relentless (Royal Navy). The crew were rescued by U-532 (Kriegsmarine).
HMS LCI(S)-2511	Royal Navy	The landing craft, infantry (small) (63/110 t, 1943) was wrecked at Portslade, Sussex.
Leda	Kriegsmarine	World War II: The cargo ship was bombed and sunk in the Aegean Sea off Amorgos, Greece by British aircraft.
Miriam	United Kingdom	The cargo ship ran aground off Cape Otranto, Greece. She was a total loss.
Toyo Maru No.5	Japan	World War II: The cargo ship was torpedoed and sunk off Kushimoto, Japan (33°29′N 135°59′E) by USS Plunger (United States Navy). 32 crew were killed.
Toyo Maru No.8	Japan	World War II: The cargo ship was torpedoed and sunk off Kushimoto, Japan (33°29′N 135°59′E) by USS Plunger (United States Navy). 15 crew were killed.
V 1702 Unitas III	Kriegsmarine	The Vorpostenboot collided with U-987 (Kriegsmarine) and sank in the Baltic Sea.
Yahiya	Syria	World War II: The sailing ship (64 GRT) was rammed and sunk in the Mediterranean Sea six nautical miles (11 km) off Cape Basit by U-453 (Kriegsmarine). All crew survived.

== 3 February ==
List of shipwrecks: 3 February 1944
Ship	State	Description
Ariake Maru	Japan	World War II: Convoy HI-30: The Standard Wartime Type 1TM oiler was torpedoed and sunk in the East China Sea 200 nautical miles (370 km) south east of Shanghai (28°32′N 124°04′E) by USS Tambor (United States Navy). Nineteen passengers and 28 crewmen were killed.
Chung Cheng	China	World War II: The Liberty ship was torpedoed and sunk in the Gulf of Aden (13°54′N 54°30′E) by U-188 (Kriegsmarine) with the loss of twenty of her 71 crew. Survivors were rescued by a British merchant ship.
Goyo Maru	Imperial Japanese Navy	World War II: Convoy HI-30: The Goyo Maru-class auxiliary oiler was torpedoed and damaged in the East China Sea 200 nautical miles (370 km) south east of Shanghai (28°32′N 124°04′E) by USS Tambor (United States Navy) and was abandoned. She sank sometime between 3 and 5 February at 28°44′N 123°38′E. Three passengers and fifteen crewmen were killed.
M 18	Kriegsmarine	World War II: The minesweeper was bombed and severely damaged in a raid on Wilhelmshaven by the United States Eighth Air Force.
M 29	Kriegsmarine	World War II: The minesweeper was bombed and severely damaged in a raid on Wilhelmshaven by the United States Eighth Air Force.
Masfjord	Norway	The coaster (193 GRT, 1907) ran aground at Masfjordnes, Hordaland in a storm. She capsized and sank with the loss of eleven lives.
Monte Pascoal	Kriegsmarine	World War II: The Monte-class ocean liner, being used as an accommodation ship was bombed and sunk at Wilhelmshaven by United States Eighth Air Force aircraft. She was raised in May 1944, and temporary repairs were carried out. She was later scuttled.
Nichiai Maru	Japan	World War II: The cargo ship was bombed and sunk in the Pacific Ocean off New Hanover Island, New Guinea (3°00′S 160°10′E) by Consolidated B-24 Liberator aircraft of the United States Navy and North American B-25 Mitchell aircraft of the United States Fifth Air Force.
RA 15	Kriegsmarine	World War II: The minesweeper was sunk at Svendborg, Denmark by Danish saboteurs.

== 4 February ==
List of shipwrecks: 4 February 1944
Ship	State	Description
I-175	Imperial Japanese Navy	World War II: The Type B submarine was depth charged and sunk in the Pacific Ocean off the Marshall Islands (06°48′N 168°08′E) by USS Charrette and USS Fair (both United States Navy) with the loss of all 100 crew.
SG 18	Kriegsmarine	World War II: The anti-aircraft corvette was bombed and sunk at Toulon, Var by Allied aircraft.
U-854	Kriegsmarine	World War II: The Type IXC/40 submarine struck a mine and sank in the Baltic Sea north of Swinemünde, Pomerania (54°44′N 14°16′E) with the loss of 51 of her 58 crew.
Vautour	Kriegsmarine	World War II: The Aigle-class destroyer was bombed and sunk at Toulon by Allied aircraft.

== 5 February ==
List of shipwrecks: 5 February 1944
Ship	State	Description
Asahi Maru	Imperial Japanese Navy	The Asahi Maru-class auxiliary transport ship was damaged in a collision with Menju Maru (Japan) in the Inland Sea west of Ushijima 1.25 nautical miles (2.32 km; 1.44 mi) off Bizan Seto (34°21′N 133°46′E) and was beached. All aboard were rescued. She broke in two on 24 February and was declared a total loss. The vessel's cargo was salvaged at the end of February. The wreck was scrapped in December 1949.
Koryo Maru No. 2	Japan	World War II: The coaster was torpedoed and sunk in the Strait of Malacca off Penang, Malaya by HMS Stonehenge (Royal Navy).
Lusan Maru	Japan	World War II: The cargo ship was bombed and sunk in the South China Sea off Swatow, China by Consolidated B-24 Liberator and North American B-25 Mitchell aircraft of the United States Fourteenth Air Force.
M 156	Kriegsmarine	World War II: The minesweeper was damaged in a battle with HMS Brissenden, HMS Talybont, HMS Tanatside and HMS Wensleydale (all Royal Navy) and was beached at Aber Wrac'h, Finistère, France. She was then destroyed the next day by Hawker Typhoon aircraft of 266 Squadron, Royal Air Force. Seven crew were killed.
Radbod	Germany	World War II: The cargo ship was bombed and sunk at Selbervik, Norway by British aircraft.
Rozan Maru	Imperial Japanese Navy	World War II: The auxiliary gunboat was bombed and sunk in the South China Sea off Swatow by Consolidated B-24 Liberator and North American B-25 Mitchell aircraft of the United States Fourteenth Air Force.
Seikyo Maru	Japan	World War II: The cargo ship was bombed and sunk in the South China Sea off Swatow by Consolidated B-24 Liberator and North American B-25 Mitchell aircraft of the United States Fourteenth Air Force.
Strabon	Germany	World War II: The cargo ship was scuttled at Toulon, Var, France. She was refloated on 2 June 1945. She was condemned in December 1947 and subsequently scrapped.
Taishin Maru	Japan	World War II: The cargo ship was torpedoed and sunk in the Pacific Ocean by USS Flasher (United States Navy).
Tristan	Germany	World War II: The cargo ship struck a mine and sank in the Irben Strait.

== 6 February ==
List of shipwrecks: 6 February 1944
Ship	State	Description
Grundsee	Germany	World War II: The coaster struck a mine and sank in the Irben Strait.
Kaiyu Maru	Japan	World War II: The cargo ship was bombed and sunk in the Pacific Ocean off Wewak, New Guinea by Douglas A-20 Havoc, North American B-25 Mitchell and Curtiss P-40 Warhawk aircraft of the United States Fifth Air Force.
Takegiku Maru	Japan	World War II: The cargo ship was bombed and sunk in the Pacific Ocean off Wewak by Douglas A-20 Havoc, North American B-25 Mitchell and Curtiss P-40 Warhawk aircraft of the United States Fifth Air Force.
Takenoura Maru	Imperial Japanese Navy	The auxiliary guard boat was lost on this date.
Tatsumi Maru	Japan	World War II: The cargo ship was bombed and sunk in the Pacific Ocean off Wewak by Douglas A-20 Havoc, North American B-25 Mitchell and Curtiss P-40 Warhawk aircraft of the United States Fifth Air Force.
U-177	Kriegsmarine	World War II: The Type IXD2 submarine was depth charged and sunk in the South Atlantic west of Ascension Island (10°35′S 25°15′W) by a Consolidated PB4Y Liberator aircraft of the United States Navy with the loss of 50 of her 65 crew. Survivors were rescued by USS Omaha (United States Navy).
VMV-12	Merivoimat	World War II: Continuation War: The VMV-8-class patrol boat was sunk at Helsinki by Soviet aircraft.

== 7 February ==
List of shipwrecks: 7 February 1944
Ship	State	Description
Freidig	Norway	World War II: Convoy EN 342: The cargo ship (1,333 GRT, 1903) foundered in the Atlantic Ocean off Cape Wrath, Sutherland, United Kingdom after her cargo of rye shifted. Twenty of her 22 crew were lost.
Rheinhausen	Germany	World War II: The cargo ship was torpedoed and sunk off the coast of Norway by HMS Taku (Royal Navy). The whole crew of the Rheinhausen (including two wounded) were rescued by NS-22 (Kriegsmarine).
Viril	Sweden	World War II: The cargo ship was bombed and sunk at Chios, Greece by British aircraft.
X22	Royal Navy	World War II: The midget submarine (27/30 t, 1943) collided with HMS Syrtis (Royal Navy) and sank in the Pentland Firth with the loss of all four crew.

== 8 February ==
List of shipwrecks: 8 February 1944
Ship	State	Description
Gigliola	Italy	World War II: The cargo ship was bombed and sunk by aircraft off Zara, Yugoslavia.
Lima Maru	Imperial Japanese Army	World War II: Convoy Mo-Ta-06: The Toyooka Maru-class auxiliary troopship was torpedoed and sunk in the East China Sea south west of Kagashima (31°05′N 127°37′E) by USS Snook (United States Navy) with the loss of 2,765 troops, four workers, nine gunners and 56 crewmen. Survivors were rescued by PB-38 (Imperial Japanese Navy) and Hyoei Maru No. 5 (Japan).
HNoMS MTB 625	Royal Norwegian Navy	The Fairmile D motor torpedo boat was wrecked in the Shetland Islands.
Margit	United Kingdom	World War II: Convoy UR 108: The cargo ship (1,735 GRT, 1924) straggled behind the convoy. She was torpedoed and sunk in the Norwegian Sea south east of Iceland (61°30′N 10°30′W) by U-985 (Kriegsmarine) with the loss of all 30 crew.
Petrella	Germany	World War II: The prisoner transport was torpedoed and sunk in Suda Bay by HMS Sportsman (Royal Navy) with the loss of 2,647 of the 3,338 people on board.
Shiranesan Maru	Japan	World War II: The cargo ship was torpedoed and sunk in the Pacific Ocean west of Kyushu by USS Snook (United States Navy).
U-762	Kriegsmarine	World War II: The Type VIIC submarine was depth charged and sunk in the Atlantic Ocean southwest of Ireland (49°02′N 16°58′W) by HMS Wild Goose and HMS Woodpecker (both Royal Navy) with the loss of all 51 crew.

== 9 February ==
List of shipwrecks: 9 February 1944
Ship	State	Description
Empire Tana	United Kingdom)	The cargo ship collided with Dunav (Yugoslavia), Jaarstroom, Winsum (both Netherlands) and Shirrabank (United Kingdom) 10 nautical miles (19 km) off Casablanca, Morocco and was severely damaged. She was declared a constructive total loss. Subsequently scuttled in June on the Normandy coast as part of Operation Overlord.
Kelmscott	United Kingdom	World War II: Convoy ONS 5: The cargo ship was torpedoed and damaged in the Atlantic Ocean off Saint John's, Newfoundland Colony by U-845 (Kriegsmarine). Kelmscott was towed in to Saint John's. She departed for repairs at Baltimore, Maryland, United States on 17 August.
Pamona	Germany	World War II: The merchant ship was sunk at Crete by British aircraft.
U-238	Kriegsmarine	World War II: The Type VIIC submarine was sunk in the Atlantic Ocean southwest of Ireland by HMS Kite, HMS Magpie and HMS Starling (all Royal Navy) with the loss of all 50 crew.
U-734	Kriegsmarine	World War II: The Type VIIC submarine was sunk in the Atlantic Ocean southwest of Ireland (49°43′N 16°23′W) by HMS Starling and HMS Wild Goose (both Royal Navy) with the loss of all 49 crew.
Viva	Norway	World War II: The cargo ship (3,798 GRT, 1938) was torpedoed and sunk in the Indian Ocean (12°30′N 57°50′E) by U-188 (Kriegsmarine). All 37 crew were rescued by Marwarri (United Kingdom).

== 10 February ==
List of shipwrecks: 10 February 1944
Ship	State	Description
El Grillo	United Kingdom	World War II: The tanker (7,264 GRT, 1922) was bombed and sunk in Seyðisfjörður by Focke-Wulf Fw 200 aircraft of I Staffeln, Kampfgeschwader 40, Luftwaffe.
Malta Maru	Imperial Japanese Army	World War II: Convoy MOTA-01: The Imperial Japanese Army-chartered Yoshida Maru No. 1-class transport was torpedoed and sunk in the Bashi Channel south of Formosa (23°12′N 121°30′E) by USS Pogy (United States Navy). An unknown number of passengers and 33 crewmen were killed.
Minekaze	Imperial Japanese Navy	World War II: Convoy MOTA-01: The Minekaze-class destroyer was torpedoed and sunk in the Bashi Channel south of Formosa (23°12′N 121°30′E) by USS Pogy (United States Navy). Ninety-nine crewmen, including her commanding officer, were killed.
Nina	Italy	World War II: The cargo ship struck a mine and sank off Genoa, Italy.
Shinkoku Maru	Imperial Japanese Army	World War II: Convoy MOTA-01: The Type 1C Standard cargo ship/transport (2,746 GRT 1943) (A.K.A. Shigyoku Maru) was torpedoed and damaged in the Bashi Channel south of Formosa (23°12′N 121°30′E) by USS Pogy (United States Navy) and was run aground to prevent sinking. After emergency repairs she was refloated the next day and then was repaired at Takao before the end of the month.
U-545	Kriegsmarine	World War II: The Type IXC/40 submarine was depth charged and damaged in the Atlantic Ocean west of the Hebrides (58°17′N 13°22′W) by a Vickers Wellington aircraft of 612 Squadron, Royal Air Force with the loss of one of her 57 crew. She was consequently scuttled due to damage received.
U-666	Kriegsmarine	World War II: The Type VIIC submarine went missing on patrol in the Atlantic Ocean with the loss of all 51 crew. Cause believed to be aircraft from HMS Fencer (Royal Navy) whilst the submarine was west of Ireland attacking the homeward bound Convoy ON 223.

== 11 February ==
List of shipwrecks: 11 February 1944
Ship	State	Description
Empire Knight	United Kingdom	Carrying general cargo including war supplies, the cargo ship (7,244 GRT) struck Boon Island Ledge, a reef off Boon Island in the Gulf of Maine off Maine during a storm and broke in half. Her bow section sank on the inshore side of Boon Island Ledge in up to 90 feet (27 m) of water at 43°07′00.32″N 070°25′40.17″W, and her stern section sank approximately two nautical miles (3.7 km; 2.3 mi) south of Boon Island in 260 feet (79 m) of water at 43°06′19″N 070°27′09″W. Twenty-four members of her crew perished. She was on a voyage from Saint John, New Brunswick, Canada to Calcutta, India.
G 106 San Giorgio	Kriegsmarine	The guard ship was sunk.
Île de Bréhat	Germany	World War II: The cargo ship was sunk in the Bay of Naples 4 nautical miles (7.4 km) off Capri, Italy by Allied aircraft with the loss of six of her 48 crew.
Makki Faulbaum	Germany	World War II: The cargo ship was torpedoed and sunk 24 nautical miles (44 km) west north west of Namsos, Norway by HMS Stubborn (Royal Navy).
USS PT-279	United States Navy	The Higgins 78'-class PT boat was sunk off Bouganville Solomon Islands (05°30′S 154°15′E) in a collision with her sister boat USS PT-282 (United States Navy).
Satsuma Maru	Imperial Japanese Army	World War II: The British WWI C-class standard cargo ship/transport was damaged in the South China Sea off Wenchow, China by North American B-25 Mitchell aircraft of the Chinese Air Force and later in the day sunk (28°01′N 121°30′E) by USS Gudgeon (United States Navy) with the loss of four crew. Survivors were rescued by Tsuga and Shinko Maru No. 1 Go (both Imperial Japanese Navy).
Sturm	Germany	The coaster collided with Triton (Germany) and sank in Bergen harbour, Norway.
U-283	Kriegsmarine	World War II: The Type VIIC submarine was depth charged and sunk in the Atlantic Ocean (60°45′N 12°50′W) by a Vickers Wellington aircraft of 407 Squadron, Royal Canadian Air Force with the loss of all 49 crew.
U-424	Kriegsmarine	World War II: The Type VIIC submarine was depth charged and sunk in the Atlantic Ocean southwest of Ireland (50°00′N 18°14′W) by HMS Wild Goose and HMS Woodpecker (both Royal Navy) with the loss of all 50 crew.
V 5106 Sturm	Kriegsmarine	World War II: The Vorpostenboot was sunk in a naval battle.

== 12 February ==
List of shipwrecks: 12 February 1944
Ship	State	Description
Choko Maru	Imperial Japanese Navy	World War II: The Choko Maru-class auxiliary netlayer (889 GRT, 1940) was torpedoed and sunk north west of Penang, Malaya (05°46′N 99°52′E) by HMS Stonehenge (Royal Navy).
Harm Fritzen	Germany	World War II: The cargo ship was torpedoed and damaged off the coast of Norway by HMS Taku (Royal Navy). She was consequently beached.
I-27	Imperial Japanese Navy	World War II: The Type B1 submarine was depth charged, shelled, torpedoed and sunk in the Indian Ocean 60 nautical miles (110 km; 69 mi) south west of the One and a Half Degree Channel (1°25′N 72°22′E) by HMS Paladin and HMS Petard (both Royal Navy) with the loss of 98 of her 99 crew and a war correspondent. The survivor was taken as a prisoner of war.
Khedive Ismail	United Kingdom	World War II: Convoy KR 8: The passenger ship (7,513 GRT, 1922) was torpedoed and sunk in the Indian Ocean 60 nautical miles (110 km; 69 mi) south west of the One and a Half Degree Channel (1°25′N 72°22′E) by I-27 (Imperial Japanese Navy) with the loss of 1,297 of the 1,511 people on board. Survivors were rescued by HMS Paladin (Royal Navy).
No. 11	Soviet Navy	The No. 11-class landing tender was lost on this date.
Oria	Germany	World War II: The transport ship (2,127 GRT, 1920), attempting to avoid an attack by a submarine, ran aground in a storm on the Gaideronos Reef, Rhodes, Greece and broke in two. Only 60 of the approximately 4,300 people (mostly Italian prisoners) on board were rescued.
Ro-110	Imperial Japanese Navy	World War II: The Ro-100-class submarine was depth charged and sunk in the Bay of Bengal (17°25′N 83°21′E) by HMIS Jumna (Royal Indian Navy), HMAS Ipswich, and HMAS Launceston (both Royal Australian Navy) with a loss of all 47 crewmen.
Ronsan Maru	Japan	World War II: The Konsan Maru-class tanker was torpedoed and sunk in the East China Sea off Okinoerabu Island, 40 nautical miles (74 km; 46 mi) west of Amami-o-Shima, (24°44′N 128°42′E) by USS Tambor (United States Navy). Two gunners and seventeen crewmen were killed.

== 13 February ==
List of shipwrecks: 13 February 1944
Ship	State	Description
HMT Cap d' Antifer	Royal Navy	World War II: The naval trawler (294 GRT, 1912) was sunk in the North Sea (53°17′N 01°06′E) by a Kriegsmarine Schnellboot with all 24 hands.
Hans Bornhofen	Germany	World War II: The cargo ship was torpedoed and sunk off Stavanger, Norway (59°09′N 5°24′E) by HMS Taku (Royal Navy).
Henry	Norway	World War II: The cargo ship (628 GRT, 1907) was sunk at Hustadvika, off Kristiansund by HNoMS MTB 627 and HNoMS MTB 653 (both Royal Norwegian Navy).
Irma	Norway	World War II: The passenger ship (1,392 GRT, 1905) was sunk at Hustadvika, off Kristiansund by HNoMS MTB 627 and HNoMS MTB 653 (both Royal Norwegian Navy).
USS LCT-220	United States Navy	The landing craft tank foundered off Anzio, Lazio, Italy in a storm.
Shoka Maru	Japan	World War II: The cargo ship was bombed and sunk in the South China Sea off Hainan, China by North American B-25 Mitchell aircraft of the United States Fifth Air Force.
VAS 206	Regia Marina	The VAS 201-class submarine chaser was wrecked off Capri.
Yoshino Maru	Japan	World War II: The cargo ship was bombed and sunk in the Pacific Ocean off Aitape, New Guinea by Douglas A-20 Havoc aircraft of the United States Fifth Air Force.

== 14 February ==
List of shipwrecks: 14 February 1944
Ship	State	Description
BMO-176	Soviet Navy	World War II: The PP-19-OK-class motor anti-submarine boat ran aground during a landing operation at Meriküla, Estonia, and was then destroyed by German guns. 12 crew died aboard or while trying to join the landed troops, three other died six days later while trying to cross the frozen sea to escape and five managed to return to Soviet lines.
BMO-177	Soviet Navy	World War II: The PP-19-OK-class motor anti-submarine boat was sunk by a mine during a landing operation at Meriküla, Estonia. 15 crew were killed.
Brynilen	Norway	World War II: The troopship (316 GRT, 1912) was bombed and sunk at Hammerfest, Finnmark. She was raised in 1947 and scrapped in 1951.
Dozan Maru	Japan	World War II: The cargo ship was wrecked after running aground near Incheon, Korea. There were no casualties.
Hokuan Maru	Japan	World War II: Convoy MO-72: The tanker was torpedoed and sunk in the Mindoro Strait (13°44′N 120°29′E) by USS Flasher (United States Navy). 45 crewmen were killed.
KF 458	Kriegsmarine	The gunboat, a converted MFP-C landing craft, was sunk by Allied fighter-bomber aircraft in Livorno, Italy. All crew survived, one being wounded.
HMS LCP(R) 781	Royal Navy	The landing craft personnel (rocket) was lost in a collision in British waters.
Minryo Maru	Imperial Japanese Army	World War II: Convoy MO-72: The repair ship was torpedoed and sunk in the Mindoro Strait (13°44′N 120°37′E) by USS Flasher (United States Navy). Four passengers and four of the crew, or eight crew, were killed.
Mitsu Maru	Japan	World War II: The cargo ship was bombed and sunk off the mouth of the Sepik, New Guinea by Consolidated B-24 Liberator aircraft of the United States Navy.
Nittoku Maru	Japan	World War II: The cargo ship was torpedoed and sunk in the Pacific Ocean by USS Snook (United States Navy). 43 crew were killed.
HMS Salviking	Royal Navy	World War II: The salvage vessel (1,440 GRT, 1943) was torpedoed and sunk in the Laccadive Sea south west of Ceylon (3°30′N 76°30′E) by U-168 (Kriegsmarine) with the loss of 27 of her 55 crew.
Tanahorn	Norway	World War II: The coaster (336 GRT, 1910) was bombed and sunk at Hammerfest. She was refloated in March 1944, repaired, and returned to service in April 1947.
U-738	Kriegsmarine	The Type VIIC submarine was sunk in a collision off Gotenhafen, West Prussia with Erna (Germany) with the loss of 22 of her 46 crew. She was refloated on 3 March but was not repaired.

== 15 February ==
List of shipwrecks: 15 February 1944
Ship	State	Description
Agano	Imperial Japanese Navy	World War II: The Agano-class cruiser was torpedoed and damaged in the Pacific Ocean north of Truk (10°11′N 151°42′E) by USS Skate (United States Navy) with the loss of 203 of her 726 crew. She sank on 17 February. Survivors were rescued by Oite (Imperial Japanese Navy), but were all lost when she was also sunk later by aircraft.
Elihu Yale	United States	World War II: The Liberty ship was sunk by a Luftwaffe glider bomb in the Mediterranean Sea off Anzio, Lazio, Italy (41°27′N 12°38′E). Seven stevadores, two gunners and three crewmen were killed. Survivors were rescued by USS LCT-152 (United States Navy).
Epaminondas C. Embiricos	Greece	World War II: The cargo ship (4,385 GRT, 1927) was torpedoed and sunk in the Laccadive Sea south west of Ceylon (1°30′N 73°00′E) by U-168 (Kriegsmarine) with the loss of four of her 42 crew. Two crew were taken on board U-168 as prisoner of war. The rest of the survivors were rescued by HMS Fara and HMT Overdale Wyke (both Royal Navy).
Fort St. Nicholas	United Kingdom	World War II: Operation Shingle: The Fort ship (7,154 GRT, 1943) was torpedoed and sunk in the Mediterranean Sea east of Capri, Campania, Italy (40°34′N 14°37′E) by U-410 (Kriegsmarine). All 67 people on board were rescued by a Royal Air Force rescue boat.
Hoshi Maru	Japan	World War II: The cargo ship struck a mine and sank in the South China Sea off the coast of Korea.
Hoshi Maru No.2	Japan	World War II: The cargo ship was torpedoed and sunk in the Pacific Ocean by USS Snook (United States Navy).
I-43	Imperial Japanese Navy	World War II: The Type B1 submarine was torpedoed and sunk in the Pacific Ocean 280 miles (450 km) east south east of Guam (10°23′N 150°23′E) by USS Aspro (United States Navy). Lost with all 166 hands.
Kamome Maru	Japan	World War II: The cargo ship was torpedoed and sunk in the Tsushima Strait by USS Snook (United States Navy).
USS LCT-35	United States Navy	World War II: The LCT Mk 5-class landing craft tank was burned out and sunk while tied up alongside Elihu Yale (United States) when she was sunk by a glide bomb off Anzio. Survivors rescued by USS LCT-152 (United States Navy).
M 3411	Kriegsmarine	World War II: The minesweeper collided with another vessel and sank in the North Sea off the coast of Suffolk, United Kingdom whilst engaged in a battle with HMMTB 439, HMMTB 441, HMMTB 443, HMMTB 444 and HMMTB 455 (all Royal Navy).
Matsu Maru	Japan	World War II: The cargo ship was sunk in an air attack at Rabaul, New Guinea.
Messina	Sweden	World War II: The auxiliary schooner struck a mine and sank at Falsterbo. Her crew were rescued. She was refloated in March 1945, repaired and returned to service.
HNoMS ML 210	Royal Norwegian Navy	World War II: The Fairmile B motor launch was mined and sunk off the Somme estuary. Five crewmen were killed.
Niedersachsen	Kriegsmarine	World War II: The auxiliary minelayer was torpedoed and sunk off Toulouse, Var, France (43°02.6′N 6°01.7′E) by HMS Upstart (Royal Navy) with the loss of twelve of her crew.
Odatsuki Maru	Imperial Japanese Army	World War II: Convoy H-17: The Odatsuki Maru-class transport was torpedoed and sunk in the Flores Sea (09°15′N 127°00′E) by USS Tinosa (United States Navy). Four guards and six crewmen were killed. Survivors were rescued by Nagata Maru (Imperial Japanese Navy).
Paule	Germany	World War II: The sailing vessel was sunk in the Mediterranean Sea off Hyères, Var by HMS Ultor (Royal Navy).
Ping Sang	(France) Vichy French Navy	World War II: The patrol boat was bombed and sunk in the South China Sea off Hongay, French Indochina (21°00′N 107°22′E) by North American B-25 Mitchell aircraft of the United States Fourteenth Air Force.
Ro-40	Imperial Japanese Navy	World War II: The Ro-35-class submarine was depth charged and sunk in the Pacific Ocean north west of Kwajalein Atoll (09°50′N 166°35′E) by USS Macdonough, USS Phelps and USS Sage (all United States Navy). Lost with all 69 hands.
Ryoka Maru	Japan	World War II: The cargo ship struck a mine and sank in the East China Sea off the mouth of the Yangtze (31°16′N 121°45′E).
Taiyo Maru No. 3	Imperial Japanese Navy	World War II: The auxiliary gunboat was sunk at Rabaul, New Guinea by USS Gato (United States Navy).
UIT-23	Kriegsmarine	World War II: The submarine was torpedoed and sunk in the Strait of Malacca (4°27′N 100°11′E) by HMS Tally-Ho (Royal Navy) with the loss of 31 of her crew (26 German and 5 Italian). There were 14 survivors.

== 16 February ==
List of shipwrecks: 16 February 1944
Ship	State	Description
CH-39	Imperial Japanese Navy	World War II: Convoy SO-903: The No.13-class submarine chaser was damaged off Three Island Harbour, New Hanover Island (02°24′S 150°06′E) by North American B-25 Mitchell aircraft of the 500th Bomb Squadron and run aground on a reef. She was later bombed and destroyed by aircraft of the 345th Bomb Group, United States Fifth Air Force. 14 crewmen were killed.
CHa-16	Imperial Japanese Navy	World War II: The auxiliary submarine chaser was bombed and sunk off New Ireland (02°24′S 150°06′E) by North American B-25 Mitchell aircraft of the 38th and 345th Bomb Group, United States Fifth Air Force.
Chojo Maru	Imperial Japanese Army	World War II: Convoy H-17: The Chojo Maru-class transport was torpedoed and sunk in the Philippine Sea (08°30′N 126°58′E) by USS Tinosa (United States Navy). A total of 748 troops and sailors, seventeen gunners, three guards, fifteen lookouts and 72 crewmen were killed.
Elihu Yale	United States	World War II: The Liberty ship was bombed and sunk in the Mediterranean Sea off Anzio, Lazio, Italy by German aircraft.
Grauerort	Germany	World War II: The sailing vessel was sunk at Zante, Greece by British aircraft. She was later refloated and returned to service.
HA-52	Imperial Japanese Navy	World War II: The Type B midget submarine was sunk off Three Island Harbor, New Hanover Island (02°24′S 150°06′E) by North American B-25 Mitchell aircraft of the 500th Bomb Squadron. One crewman killed, one rescued by CH-39 (Imperial Japanese Navy).
HMS LST 418	Royal Navy	World War II: Operation Shingle: The landing ship tank was torpedoed and sunk in the Mediterranean Sea north west of Ponza Island, Italy (41°00′N 12°55′E) by U-230 (Kriegsmarine) with the loss of 21 lives. Survivors were rescued by USS LCI(L)-194 (United States Navy).
Sanko Maru	Imperial Japanese Navy	World War II: Convoy SO-903: The Sanko Maru-class auxiliary collier/oiler was sunk off Three Island Harbour (02°24′S 150°06′E) by North American B-25 Mitchell aircraft of the 500th Bomb Squadron, of the 345th Bomb Group, United States Fifth Air Force. Fourteen crewmen were killed.

== 17 February ==
List of shipwrecks: 17 February 1944
Ship	State	Description
Aikoku Maru	Imperial Japanese Navy	Aikoku Maru explodes World War II: Operation Hailstorm: The Hokuku Maru-class armed merchant cruiser was bombed and damaged, later in the day she exploded and sank in Truk Lagoon, South Pacific Mandate (07°22′N 151°56′E) after being torpedoed by a Grumman TBF Avenger aircraft that went down from the blast. Most of the ships' crew including Captain Nakamaruo and 945 sailors, passengers and men of the First Brigade were killed. In July 1980 remains of 400 of those killed were returned to Japan.
Akagi Maru	Imperial Japanese Navy	World War II: Operation Hailstorm: The Akagi Maru-class armed merchant cruiser was bombed and damaged at Truk (07°50′N 151°25′E) by United States Navy aircraft and was consequently scuttled. A total of 512 passengers and 788 sailors were killed.
Amagisan Maru	Imperial Japanese Navy	World War II: Operation Hailstorm: The Azumason Maru-class auxiliary transport was bombed, torpedoed, and sunk south west of Uman Island, Truk (07°18′N 151°53′E) by United States Navy aircraft. Three crewmen were killed.
CH-24	Imperial Japanese Navy	World War II: Operation Hailstorm: The No.13-class submarine chaser was shelled and sunk in the Pacific Ocean west of Truk (7°24′N 150°30′E) by USS Burns (United States Navy). Six crew survived and were taken as prisoners of war.
Empire Knoll	United Kingdom	The collier came ashore at Tynemouth, Northumberland in a gale. She broke in two, a total loss. (Look 17/02/1941)
Fujikawa Maru	Imperial Japanese Navy	The wreck of Fujikawa Maru on 20 January 2011 World War II: Operation Hailstorm: The Akiura Maru-class auxiliary transport (a.k.a. Fujigawa Maru) was torpedoed and sunk in 138 feet (42 m) of water in the Pacific Ocean off Truk (7°20′N 151°53′E) by United States Navy Grumman TBF Avenger aircraft. No casualties were reported.
Fujisan Maru	Imperial Japanese Navy	World War II: Operation Hailstorm: The Fujisan Maru-class oiler was bombed and damaged between Moen and Dublan, Truk by United States Navy aircraft. She sank on 18 February. Two troops and two crewmen were killed.
Fuku Maru No. 2	Imperial Japanese Navy	World War II: The guard boat was bombed, torpedoed and sunk in Koravia Bay, New Britain by United States Navy Grumman TBF Avenger and Douglas SBD Dauntless aircraft.
Fumizuki	Imperial Japanese Navy	World War II: Operation Hailstorm: The Mutsuki-class destroyer was torpedoed and damaged off Truk (07°24′N 151°44′E) by United States Navy aircraft. She sank the next day with the loss of 29 of her 154 crew. Survivors were rescued by Matsukaze and Hakachi (both Imperial Japanese Navy).
Gosei Maru	Japan	World War II: Operation Hailstorm: The cargo ship was bombed and sunk at Truk by United States Navy aircraft from Task Force 58.
Gyoraitei No. 10	Imperial Japanese Navy	World War II: Operation Hailstorm: The T-51-class motor torpedo boat was sunk by US Navy aircraft (07°31′N 151°59′E).
Gyoten Maru	Imperial Japanese Army	World War II: Convoy No. 3206: The auxiliary transport ship was torpedoed, broke in two and sank in the Pacific Ocean 185 miles (298 km) west of Truk (8°04′N 149°28′E) by USS Tang (United States Navy). An unknown number of troops and eight crewmen were killed. Fujinami (Imperial Japanese Navy) rescued many survivors, but had to discontinue due to becoming unstable from the large numbers rescued. 1,000 survivors were rescued by other ships of the convoy.
Hanakawa Maru	Japan	World War II: Operation Hailstorm: The Type 1B Standard Wartime cargo ship was bombed and sunk at Truk by United States Navy aircraft from Task Force 58.
Hoki Maru	Imperial Japanese Navy	World War II: Operation Hailstorm: The auxiliary transport (7,113 GRT 1922) was bombed and sunk off Eten Island, Truk (07°21′N 151°56′E) by United States Navy carrier aircraft. 23 crewmen were killed.
Hokuyo Maru	Japan	World War II: Operation Hailstorm: The cargo ship was bombed and sunk at Truk by United States Navy aircraft from Task Force 58.
Hoyo Maru	Imperial Japanese Navy	World War II: Operation Hailstorm: The Hoyo Maru-class oiler was bombed, capsized and sank in shallow water with part of the hull above water east of Fenfar Island, Truk by United States Navy aircraft. Six crewmen were killed.
I-11	Imperial Japanese Navy	World War II: The Type A1 submarine was sunk in the Pacific Ocean by USS Nicholson (United States Navy).
Iwate Maru	Japan	World War II: The cargo ship was bombed, torpedoed and sunk in Koravia Bay, New Britain by United States Navy Grumman TBF Avenger and Douglas SBD Dauntless aircraft. There were no casualties.
Jozan Maru	Japan	World War II: The cargo ship was torpedoed and sunk in the Pacific Ocean south of Truk by USS Cod (United States Navy).
Kashi Maru	Imperial Japanese Navy	World War II: The Shinto Maru No. 2-class auxiliary transport ship (544 GRT, 1941) was bombed and damaged in the Pacific Ocean off New Hanover Island and was beached, or was bombed and sunk at Kavieng, New Ireland near Three Island, by North American B-25 Mitchell aircraft of the United States Army Air Force. One crewman was killed.
Katori	Imperial Japanese Navy	World War II: Operation Hailstorm: The Katori-class cruiser was shelled and sunk in the Pacific Ocean 40 nautical miles (74 km; 46 mi) north west of Truk (07°15′N 151°15′E) by USS Iowa (United States Navy).
Kensho Maru	Imperial Japanese Navy	World War II: Operation Hailstorm: The Kensho Maru-class auxiliary transport was bombed, torpedoed, and sunk at Truk (07°23′N 151°51′E) by United States Navy aircraft. Six crewmen were killed.
Kiyosumi Maru	Imperial Japanese Navy	World War II: Operation Hailstorm: The Kiyosumi Maru-class auxiliary cruiser was bombed, torpedoed, and sunk in the Pacific Ocean off Fefan Island, Truk (7°23′N 151°53′E) by United States Navy aircraft. 43 crewmen were killed.
Maikaze	Imperial Japanese Navy	World War II: Operation Hailstorm: Convoy No. 4215: The Kagerō-class destroyer was shelled and sunk in the Pacific Ocean 40 nautical miles (74 km) north west of Truk by USS Minneapolis and USS New Orleans (both United States Navy) with the loss of all 239 crew.
Matsutani Maru	Japan	World War II: Operation Hailstorm: The cargo ship was bombed and sunk at Truk by United States Navy aircraft from Task Force 58.
Momokawa Maru	Imperial Japanese Navy	World War II: Operation Hailstorm: The Shunko Maru-class auxiliary transport (a.k.a. Momogawa Maru) was bombed and sunk at Truk (07°20′N 151°23′E) by United States Navy Curtiss SB2C Helldiver aircraft from Task Force 58's USS Bunker Hill (United States Navy). One crewman was killed.
Nagano Maru	Imperial Japanese Army	World War II: Operation Hailstorm: The 3,810-gross register ton Akita Maru-class auxiliary transport was strafed, bombed, and sunk at Truk by United States Navy aircraft. Her captain and 59 crew were rescued by Fujinami (Imperial Japanese Navy) on 24 February and taken to Palau.
Naka	Imperial Japanese Navy	World War II: Operation Hailstorm: The Sendai-class cruiser was bombed, torpedoed and sunk 25 miles (40 km) west of Truk in the Pacific Ocean (07°15′N 151°15′E) by United States Navy aircraft. Two hundred and forty crewmen were lost; there were 210 survivors.
Nichiro Maru	Imperial Japanese Navy	World War II: Convoy No. 7125: The Nichiro Maru-class auxiliary transport was torpedoed, exploded and sank in the Pacific Ocean 155 miles (249 km) north of Palau (08°50′N 135°40′E) by USS Sargo (United States Navy). Her captain and 49 crewmen were killed. Survivors were rescued the next day by Kitakame Maru (Imperial Japanese Navy).
Nippo Maru	Imperial Japanese Navy	World War II: Operation Hailstorm: The Nippo Maru-class auxiliary water tanker (3,763 GRT 1936) was bombed and damaged in the Natshushima anchorage (east of Dublon Island), Truk (07°22′N 151°56′E) by United States Navy aircraft from Task Force 58, sinking the next day.
No. 2	Imperial Japanese Navy	The auxiliary minesweeper either foundered, or was beached, in Karavia Bay, Rabaul. Scrapped 1958.
R-39	Kriegsmarine	World War II: The Type R-25 minesweeper was sunk by Allied aircraft at Porto Ercole.
R-200	Kriegsmarine	World War II: The Type R-151 minesweeper was sunk by Allied aircraft at Porto Ercole.
Reiyo Maru	Imperial Japanese Army	World War II: Operation Hailstorm: The Choyo Maru-class auxiliary transport ship was bombed, damaged, and set afire at Truk (7°25′N 151°45′E) by United States Navy aircraft from Task Force 58 carriers USS Essex, and USS Intrepid (both United States Navy). The vessel sank on 19 February about three miles (4.8 km) off Eten Island (07°43′N 151°46′E). Eight crewmen were killed.
Rio de Janeiro Maru	Imperial Japanese Navy	World War II: Operation Hailstorm: The anchored Buenos Aires Maru-class auxiliary transport (known as Rio Maru in IJN service) was bombed and damaged in the Pacific Ocean east of Umon Island, Truk (7°20′N 151°53′E) by United States Navy aircraft. She sank the next day in 115 feet (35 m) of water. Two crewmen were killed.
ShCh-216	Soviet Navy	World War II: The Shchuka-class submarine was depth charged and sunk in the Black Sea west of Sevastopol (44°37′N 32°04′E) by UJ-106 (Kriegsmarine) with the loss of all 47 crew.
Seiko Maru	Japan	World War II: Operation Hailstorm: The cargo ship was bombed and sunk at Truk by United States Navy aircraft from Task Force 58.
Shinkoku Maru	Imperial Japanese Navy	World War II: Operation Hailstorm: The Shinkoku Maru-class oiler was bombed and damaged north west of Fefan Island, Truk by United States Navy aircraft. She was bombed again on 18 February and sank in shallow water (7°20′N 151°40′E). Seventy passengers and sixteen crewmen were killed.
Shoei Maru No. 7 Go	Imperial Japanese Navy	The auxiliary guard boat was lost on this date.
Shonan Maru No.15	Imperial Japanese Navy	World War II: Operation Hailstorm: Convoy No. 4215: The auxiliary submarine chaser/naval trawler was shelled and sunk in the Pacific Ocean north west of Truk by USS New Jersey (United States Navy).
Tachikaze	Imperial Japanese Navy	A U.S. Navy Grumman F6F Hellcat aircraft passes over the sinking Tachikaze. World War II: Operation Hailstorm: The Minekaze-class destroyer was torpedoed and sunk in the Pacific Ocean 40 nautical miles (74 km; 46 mi) off Kuop, Truk (07°03′N 151°5′E) by United States Navy aircraft with the loss of 67 crewmen.
Taiho Maru	Japan	World War II: Operation Hailstorm: The cargo ship was bombed and sunk at Truk by United States Navy aircraft from Task Force 58.
Taikichi Maru	Japan	World War II: Operation Hailstorm: The cargo ship was bombed and sunk at Truk by United States Navy aircraft from Task Force 58.
Tatuha Maru	Imperial Japanese Army	World War II: Operation Hailstorm: Convoy No. 3206: The Shiraha Maru-class auxiliary transport was bombed and sunk in the Pacific Ocean 75 miles (121 km) northwest of Truk by United States Navy Douglas SBD Dauntless dive bomber aircraft from USS Intrepid (United States Navy). Her bridge was blown off killing her bridge crew and many senior Imperial Japanese Army officers. She sank at 07°48′N 151°27′E. 535 troops and crew were killed. Fujinami, Amakusa (both Imperial Japanese Navy), Ryuko Maru, and Ryuko Maru (both Japan), rescued 800, but 500 went missing.
Tonan Maru No. 3	Japan	World War II: Operation Hailstorm: The Tonan Maru No. 2-class auxiliary oiler was bombed and damaged at Truk by United States Navy aircraft. She was bombed again on 18 February and sank in shallow water. Three hundred and fifteen people were killed. The wreck was raised on 3 March 1951, towed to Japan and repaired. The vessel returned to service as a whale oil factory ship on 8 October 1951.
Unkai Maru No. 6	Imperial Japanese Navy	World War II: Operation Hailstorm: The Unkai Maru No. 6-class general work ship was bombed and damaged at Truk by United States Navy aircraft from Task Force 58 carriers USS Essex, USS Bunker Hill and USS Yorktown (all United States Navy). Bombed and sunk the next day by aircraft from Essex at 07°19′N 151°45′E. Three crew were killed during the attacks.
Unknown Daihatsu landing barges	Imperial Japanese Navy	World War II: Operation Hailstorm: Several barges loaded with men are bombed and sunk by Grumman TBF Avenger aircraft from USS Yorktown (United States Navy).
W-26	Imperial Japanese Navy	World War II: The W-19-class minesweeper was bombed, torpedoed and sunk in Koravia Bay, New Britain by United States Navy aircraft. Scrapped in situ in 1958.
Yamagiri Maru	Imperial Japanese Navy	World War II: Operation Hailstorm: The anchored Shinko Maru-class auxiliary transport ship was bombed and sunk north of Fefan Island, Truk 07°23′N 151°50′E by United States Navy aircraft from Task Force 58. 11 crewmen were killed.
Yamakisan Maru	Japan	World War II: Operation Hailstorm: The cargo ship was bombed and sunk at Truk by United States Navy aircraft from Task Force 58.
Yubae Maru	Japan	World War II: Operation Hailstorm: The cargo ship was bombed and sunk at Truk by United States Navy aircraft from Task Force 58.
Zuikai Maru	Imperial Japanese Navy	World War II: Operation Hailstorm: Convoy No. 3206: The cargo ship was bombed and sunk in the Pacific Ocean north west of Truk by United States Navy Douglas SBD Dauntless dive bomber aircraft from USS Intrepid (United States Navy). Fujinami and Amakusa (both Imperial Japanese Navy) rescued an unknown number of survivors.

== 18 February ==
List of shipwrecks: 18 February 1944
Ship	State	Description
HMS Breda	Royal Navy	World War II: The submarine tender (1,207 GRT, 1912) was badly damaged in a collision off Campbeltown Argyllshire with HMS Proteus (Royal Navy), was beached but then sank later the same day while being re-floated to be taken for repair. There were no casualties.
CH-29	Imperial Japanese Navy	World War II: Operation Hailstorm: The submarine chaser was sunk in the Pacific Ocean north west of Udot Isaland, Truk (07°25′N 151°45′E) by United States Navy aircraft.
CHa-17	Imperial Japanese Navy	World War II: The CHa-1-class auxiliary submarine chaser was sunk off Kavieng, New Ireland by American aircraft.
Ettore	Germany	World War II: The cargo ship was damaged in an Allied air raid on Livorno, Italy and was beached. The ship was eventually scuttled as a blockship at Livorno, Italy in July 1944.
F 442C	Kriegsmarine	The MFP-C landing craft was sunk on this date.
Heian Maru	Imperial Japanese Navy	World War II: Operation Hailstorm: The Heian Maru-class submarine tender was bombed and damaged in the Pacific Ocean off Truk (07°23′N 151°52′E) by United States Navy aircraft. The wreck was later refloated, towed to a Japanese port, and scrapped.
USS LCT-205	United States Navy	The LCT Mk 5-class landing craft tank capsized in the Gulf of Tunis while under tow.
Oite	Imperial Japanese Navy	World War II: Operation Hailstone: The Kamikaze-class destroyer was torpedoed and sunk in the Pacific Ocean off Truk (07°40′N 138°57′E) by a United States Navy Grumman TBF Avenger aircraft with the loss of 172 of her 192 crew and all 523 survivors from Agano (Imperial Japanese Navy).
HMS Penelope	Royal Navy	World War II: Operation Shingle: The Arethusa-class cruiser (5,270/6,715 t, 1936) was torpedoed and sunk in the Mediterranean Sea 35 nautical miles (65 km) west of Naples, Campania, Italy (40°33′N 13°14′E) by U-410 (Kriegsmarine) with the loss of 417 of her 623 crew. Survivors were rescued by HMS LST 165 and HMS LST 430 (both Royal Navy).
San Francisco Maru	Imperial Japanese Navy	World War II: Operation Hailstorm: The 5,831-gross register ton Daifuku Maru No. 1-class auxiliary transport was bombed and sunk in 140 to 210 feet (43 to 64 m) of water in Truk Lagoon (7°22′N 151°54′E) by United States Navy aircraft from the aircraft carrier USS Essex. Five crewmen were killed.
Soya	Imperial Japanese Navy	World War II: Operation Hailstorm: The Soya-class ammunition ship ran aground on a large coral head east of Dublon Island, Truk while fleeing air attacks. The vessel was lightly damaged by bombing and strafing while aground during the attacks. Ten crewmen were killed. Soya was refloated at an unknown date.
U-7	Kriegsmarine	The Type IIB submarine sank near Pillau in a diving accident with the loss of all 29 crew.
U-406	Kriegsmarine	World War II: The Type VIIC submarine was depth charged and sunk in the Atlantic Ocean (48°32′N 23°36′W) by HMS Spey (Royal Navy) with the loss of twelve of her 57 crew.
USS YT-198	United States Navy	World War II: Operation Shingle: The tug struck a mine off Anzio, Lazio, Italy and sank.

== 19 February ==
List of shipwrecks: 19 February 1944
Ship	State	Description
CH-22	Imperial Japanese Navy	World War II: Convoy O-902: The No.13-class submarine chaser was bombed and sunk in the Bismark Sea 35 nautical miles (65 km) south of Kavieng, New Ireland (03°04′S 150°42′E) by North American B-25 Mitchell aircraft of the 500th and 501st Squadrons, 345th Bomb Group and Douglas A-20 Havoc aircraft of the 23rd Bomb Group, United States Fifth Air Force.
CH-40	Imperial Japanese Navy	World War II: Convoy O-902: The No.13-class submarine chaser was bombed and sunk in the Bismark Sea 35 nautical miles (65 km) south of Kavieng (03°04′S 150°42′E) by North American B-25 Mitchell aircraft of the 500th and 501st Squadrons, 345th Bomb Group and Douglas A-20 Havoc aircraft of the 23rd Bomb Group, United States Fifth Air Force.
CHa-34	Imperial Japanese Navy	World War II: The auxiliary submarine chaser was bombed and sunk off Kavieng (02°45′S 150°47′E) by North American B-25 Mitchell aircraft of the 500th and 501st Squadrons, 345th Bomb Group and Douglas A-20 Havoc aircraft of the 23rd Bomb Group, United States Fifth Air Force.
Daikei Maru	Imperial Japanese Army	World War II: The Type 1B Wartime Standard cargo ship (a.k.a. Taikei Maru) was torpedoed and sunk in the South China Sea south south west of Takao (11°48′N 118°50′E) by USS Grayback (United States Navy). 1,533 troops, 15 gunners and 21 crewmen were killed.
Ichiyo Maru	Japan	World War II: Convoy HI-40: The Imperial Japanese Army (IJA)-chartered Wartime Standard Type 1TM tanker was torpedoed and sunk in the South China Sea 300 miles (480 km) west of Luzon (15°46′N 115°57′E) by USS Jack (United States Navy). Twenty-eight crewmen were killed.
Kokuei Maru	Japan	World War II: Convoy HI-40: The IJA-chartered Wartime Standard Type 1TM tanker was torpedoed and sunk in the South China Sea 300 miles (480 km) west of Luzon (14°34′N 114°11′E) by USS Jack (United States Navy). Six crewmen were killed.
Nanei Maru	Japan	World War II: Convoy HI-40: The IJA-chartered Standard Type 1TM tanker was torpedoed and sunk in the South China Sea 300 miles (480 km) west of Luzon (14°34′N 114°11′E) by USS Jack (United States Navy). Five gunners and 55 crewmen were killed.
Nichirin Maru	Japan	World War II: Convoy HI-40: The IJA-chartered Standard Type 1TM tanker was torpedoed and sunk in the South China Sea 300 miles (480 km) west of Luzon (15°40′N 115°48′E) by USS Jack (United States Navy). Forty-eight crewmen were killed.
Shinkiki Maru	Japan	World War II: Convoy O-902: The cargo ship was bombed and sunk in the Gazalle Channel by Douglas A-20 Havoc, North American B-25 Mitchell and Lockheed P-38 Lightning aircraft of the United States Army Air Force.
Shinto Maru No. 1	Japan	World War II: Convoy O-902: The cargo ship was bombed and sunk in the Gazalle Channel 22 nautical miles (41 km) south of Kavieng (02°46′S 150°42′E) by North American B-25 Mitchell aircraft of the 500th and 501st Squadrons, 345th Bomb Group and Douglas A-20 Havoc aircraft of the 23rd Bomb Group, United States Fifth Air Force. Nineteen crewmen, 41 troops and 46 gunners were lost.
Tairyu Maru	Imperial Japanese Navy	World War II: The Waihora Maru-class auxiliary transport was bombed and sunk in the Formosa Strait 20 miles (32 km) north of Kuku Point (25°25′N 121°30′E) by Consolidated B-24 Liberator aircraft of the United States Fourteenth Air Force. Seven crewmen were killed.
Tatsugiku Maru	Japan	World War II: Convoy O-902: The cargo ship was bombed and sunk in the Gazalle Channel 22 nautical miles (41 km) south of Kavieng (02°46′N 150°42′E) by North American B-25 Mitchell aircraft of the 500th and 501st Squadrons, 345th Bomb Group and Douglas A-20 Havoc aircraft of the 23rd Bomb Group, United States Fifth Air Force. Fifteen crewmen were lost.
U-264	Kriegsmarine	World War II: The Type VIIC submarine was depth charged and sunk in the Atlantic Ocean by HMS Starling and HMS Woodpecker (both Royal Navy). All 52 crew survived.
U-386	Kriegsmarine	World War II: The Type VIIC submarine was depth charged and sunk in the Atlantic Ocean (48°51′N 22°44′W) by HMS Spey (Royal Navy) with the loss of 33 of her 49 crew.

== 20 February ==
List of shipwrecks: 20 February 1944
Ship	State	Description
Elima	Germany	The cargo ship collided with another vessel in Trondheimsfjord, Norway and was beached. She broke up and sank on 23 February
Hamburg	Kriegsmarine	The MFP-A landing craft was sunk on this date.
Hydro	Norway	World War II: The train ferry was sunk in Lake Tinnsjø near Rjukan by Norwegian saboteurs whilst carrying heavy water for the German nuclear programme.
USS LCT-340	United States Navy	The LCT Mk 5-class landing craft tank foundered in a storm off Sicily, Italy, or off the coast of Algeria (36°49′N 01°55′E).
HMS LST 305	Royal Navy	World War II: Operation Shingle: The landing ship tank (1,625/4,080 t, 1942) was torpedoed and sunk in the Mediterranean Sea 41°14′N 12°31′E by U-230 (Kriegsmarine).
USS LST-348	United States Navy	World War II: Operation Shingle: The landing ship tank was torpedoed and sunk in the Mediterranean Sea 40 nautical miles (74 km) south of Naples, Campania, Italy (40°57′N 13°14′E) by U-410 (Kriegsmarine). There were 24 dead and 79 survivors.
NB-9	Yugoslav Partisans	World War II: The gunboat was rammed and sunk by a Royal Navy destroyer.
Nanyo Maru	Japan	World War II: The cargo ship was torpedoed and sunk in the South China Sea east of Formosa by USS Pogy (United States Navy).
Schwerin	Kriegsmarine	World War II: The auxiliary minelayer was sunk by British aircraft.
Taizin Maru <--not Taijin Maru, renamed 1938-->	Japan	World War II: The cargo ship was torpedoed and sunk in the South China Sea east of Formosa by USS Pogy (United States Navy).
UJ 2208 Alfred	Kriegsmarine	The naval trawler/submarine chaser was lost on this date.
HMS Warwick	Royal Navy	World War II: The W-class destroyer (1,100/1,490 t, 1918) was torpedoed and sunk in the Bristol Channel off Trevose Head, Cornwall (50°27′N 5°23′W) by U-413 (Kriegsmarine) with the loss of 67 of her 160 crew. Survivors were rescued by HMS Saladin and HMS Scimitar (both Royal Navy).
HMS Woodpecker	Royal Navy	World War II: Convoy ON 224: The Black Swan-class sloop (1,350/1,880 t, 1942) was torpedoed and damaged in the Atlantic Ocean by U-265 (Kriegsmarine). She was taken in tow but foundered on 27 February at 48°49′N 22°11′W.

== 21 February ==
List of shipwrecks: 21 February 1944
Ship	State	Description
CHa-40	Imperial Japanese Navy	World War II: Convoy O-003: The auxiliary submarine chaser was bombed and sunk north of New Hanover Island by North American B-25 Mitchell aircraft of the United States Fifth Air Force. Unknown number of survivors rescued by Nagaura (Imperial Japanese Navy).
Daigen Maru No. 6	Japan	World War II: The cargo ship was torpedoed and sunk in the Strait of Malacca by HMS Tally-Ho (Royal Navy).
Dina	Germany	World War II: The transport ship struck a mine and sank in the Tyrrhenian Sea off Genoa, Italy.
Ikoma Maru	Japan	World War II: Convoy Wewak No. 8: The cargo ship was torpedoed and sunk in the Pacific Ocean off New Guinea (03°25′N 137°06′E) by USS Seahorse (United States Navy). 418 Indian soldiers and 43 crewmen were killed.
Kokai Maru	Imperial Japanese Navy	World War II: Convoy O-003: The Kokai Maru-class auxiliary transport (3,871 GRT 1939) was bombed and sunk north of New Hanover Island (02°30′S 150°15′E) by North American B-25 Mitchell aircraft of the 500th and 501st Squadrons, 345th Bomb Group, United States Fifth Air Force. Seven passengers and nineteen crewmen were killed. An unknown number of survivors were rescued by Nagaura (Imperial Japanese Navy).
Kowa Maru	Imperial Japanese Navy	World War II: Convoy O-003: The Kowa Maru-class auxiliary transport (1,106 GRT 1940) was bombed and sunk north of New Hanover (02°30′S 150°15′E) by North American B-25 Mitchell aircraft of the 500th and 501st Squadrons, 345th Bomb Group, United States Fifth Air Force. 22 crewmen were killed. Unknown number of survivors rescued by Nagaura (Imperial Japanese Navy).
R-131	Kriegsmarine	World War II: The Type R-130 minesweeper was sunk by British aircraft off Den Helder, North Holland, Netherlands. Two crew members died in the attack and 14 were injured.
R-222	Kriegsmarine	World War II: The Type R-218 minesweeper was sunk by a mine off the Schlei Estuary.
UJ 2208	Kriegsmarine	World War II: The submarine chaser struck a mine and sank in the Tyrrhenian Sea off Genoa.
V 718	Kriegsmarine	World War II: The Ekwator-class naval trawler was sunk off Lorient by mines.
Yasukuni Maru	Imperial Japanese Army	World War II: Convoy Wewak No. 8: The British WWI C-class standard cargo ship (3,143 GRT 1920) was torpedoed and sunk in the Pacific Ocean off New Guinea (03°25′N 137°06′E) by USS Seahorse (United States Navy). 62 troops and 6 crew were killed.

== 22 February ==
List of shipwrecks: 22 February 1944
Ship	State	Description
British Chivalry	United Kingdom	World War II: The tanker (7,118 GRT, 1929) was torpedoed, shelled and sunk in the Indian Ocean (00°50′S 68°00′E) by I-37 (Imperial Japanese Navy). Survivors were machine gunned killing nineteen, the rest of the survivors were rescued by Delane (United Kingdom).
CHa-29	Imperial Japanese Navy	World War II: The auxiliary submarine chaser was sunk by a mine near Kavieng, New Ireland.
Choryu Maru	Imperial Japanese Army	World War II: The transport was shelled and sunk by USS Charles Ausburne, USS Dyson, and USS Stanly (all United States Navy) in the Isabel Channel, New Hanover Island, New Ireland, New Guinea. Three crew were killed.
E. G. Seubert	United States	World War II: Convoy PA 69: The tanker was torpedoed and sunk in the Gulf of Aden (13°50′N 48°49′E) by U-510 (Kriegsmarine) with the loss of six of her 70 crew. Survivors were rescued by HMIS Orissa (Royal Indian Navy) and HMAS Tamworth (Royal Australian Navy).
Erling Brøvig	Norway	World War II: Convoy PA 69: The tanker (9,970 GRT, 1937) was torpedoed and damaged in the Gulf of Aden (13°50′N 48°49′E) by U-510 (Kriegsmarine). She was beached off Aden. The vessel was later taken under tow to Massawa, Eritrea but broke in two during the journey. Both parts reached port and were later taken to Italy and laid up. Repaired postwar and re-entered service in 1947 as Bramora.
Evangelistria	Greece	World War II: The auxiliary sailing vessel was torpedoed and sunk in the Mediterranean Sea by HMS Unsparing (Royal Navy).
Francis Garnier	(France) Vichy French Navy	World War II: The gunboat struck a mine and sank in the Pacific Ocean off Cape St. Jacques, French Indochina.
Fukuyama Maru	Imperial Japanese Navy	World War II: The Shoei Maru-class auxiliary transport (3,581 GRT 1937) was torpedoed, blew up and sank in the Pacific Ocean (14°47′N 144°50′E) 46 miles (74 km) south west of Tinian by USS Tang (United States Navy). Forty-seven crewmen were killed.
George Cleeve	United States	World War II: Convoy GUS 31: The Liberty ship was torpedoed and damaged in the Mediterranean Sea off Bône, Algeria (37°22′N 7°17′E) by U-969 (Kriegsmarine) with the loss of one of her 69 crew. Survivors were rescued by William T. Barry (United States). George Cleeve was beached at Bône but was subsequently declared a constructive total loss.
Kyosei Maru	Imperial Japanese Navy	World War II: The Kyosei Maru-class auxiliary netlayer (500 GRT 1938) was shelled and sunk by USS Charles Ausburne, USS Dyson, and USS Stanly (all United States Navy) in the Isabel Channel, New Hanover Island, New Ireland, New Guinea. Five crew were killed.
Kyutokusan Maru	Japan	World War II: The transport (a.k.a. Tokuyama Maru No. 9) was shelled and sunk by USS Charles Ausburne, USS Dyson, and USS Stanly (all United States Navy) in the Isabel Channel, New Hanover Island, New Ireland, New Guinea.
Lisa	Germany	World War II: The cargo ship was torpedoed and sunk in the Aegean Sea north of Iraklion, Greece by British aircraft.
Nagaura	Imperial Japanese Navy	World War II: The Tategami-class salvage/repair tug was shelled and sunk in the Pacific Ocean 160 nautical miles (300 km) northwest of Kavieng (00°54′S 148°38′E) by USS Charles Ausburne, USS Dyson, USS Stanly, USS Conway and USS Spence (all United States Navy). About one hundred and fifty crewmen and survivors of the previous days air attacks that sank CHa-48, Kokai Maru and Kowa Maru survived the sinking. About half were rescued and made prisoners of war, the rest refused to be rescued and were lost.
Natsushima	Imperial Japanese Navy	World War II: The Natsushima-class coastal minelayer was shelled and sunk in the Pacific Ocean off Tingwon, New Ireland (02°49′S 149°40′E) by USS Charles Ausburne, USS Dyson and USS Stanly (all United States Navy).
Nikki Maru	Imperial Japanese Army	World War II: The Daifuku Maru No. 1-class auxiliary transport ship was torpedoed and sunk in the Pacific Ocean north of New Guinea by USS Balao (United States Navy). Eight crew and more than 50 troops died. Wakataka (Imperial Japanese Navy) rescued some survivors and took them to Manokwari on 23 February. Wakataka departed and returned to rescue more survivors on 24/25 February. In total she rescued 141.
USS PT-200	United States Navy	The Higgins 78'-class PT boat was sunk off Newport, Rhode Island (41°23′N 71°01′W) in a collision with an unknown object.
Peter Skene Ogden	United States	World War II: Convoy GUS 31: The Liberty ship was torpedoed and damaged in the Mediterranean Sea off Bône, Algeria (37°22′N 7°17′E) by U-969 (Kriegsmarine). All 77 crew survived. Peter Skene Ogden was taken in tow by HMS Hengist (Royal Navy) and beached at Herbillon but was subsequently declared a constructive total loss.
San Alvaro	United Kingdom	World War II: Convoy PA 69: The tanker (7,385 GRT, 1935) was torpedoed and sunk in the Gulf of Aden (13°46′N 48°49′E) by U-510 (Kriegsmarine) with the loss of one of her 53 crew. Survivors were rescued by HMAS Tamworth (Royal Australian Navy).
Taisho Maru	Japan	World War II: The cargo ship was bombed and sunk at Rabaul, New Guinea by Douglas SBD Dauntless and Grumman TBM Avenger aircraft of the United States Navy.
Takatori Maru	Japan	World War II: The tanker was damaged in an air attack in Karavia Bay, Rabaul and beached. Scrapped 1958.
Tama Maru No. 8 Go	Imperial Japanese Navy	World War II: The auxiliary submarine chaser was shelled and sunk in the Pacific Ocean by USS Charles Ausburne, USS Dyson, USS Stanly, USS Conway and USS Spence (all United States Navy).
Teiko Maru or Teikyo Maru	Imperial Japanese Army	World War II: Convoy MAMI-02: The transport was torpedoed and sunk in the South China Sea (03°10′N 109°15′E) by USS Puffer (United States Navy). One hundred and ninety-two troops and seven crewmen were killed.
Tenjin Maru No. 2	Imperial Japanese Navy	World War II: The picket ship was sunk in an air attack at Rabaul.

== 23 February ==
List of shipwrecks: 23 February 1944
Ship	State	Description
Anna Sofie	Norway	World War II: Convoy BE 146 ST: The cargo ship's (3,177 GRT, 1919) steering failed and she ran aground, exploded, and sank off Haugesund, Rogaland, Norway. All crew survived.
Gyoko Maru	Japan	World War II: Convoy MOTA-05 or MATA-03: The Gyoko Maru-class cargo ship caught fire in her hold and was destroyed by an explosion in Naha harbor (26°15′N 127°40′E). Unclear if fire was accidental or possibly a dud torpedo hit by USS Pogy (United States Navy) that went unnoticed. The ship was gutted by fire and sank. Six crew were killed.
Horei Maru	Japan	World War II: Convoy MOTA-05: The Horei Maru-class ore carrier was torpedoed and damaged in the Pacific Ocean 100 nautical miles (190 km; 120 mi) west of Okinawa (26°24′N 126°11′E) by USS Pogy (United States Navy). The vessel was towed by Shoan Maru (Japan) but broke in two and sank off Naha harbor (26°13′N 127°38′E) or she arrived on 24 February, blowing ashore in a gale and then breaking in two. One crewman was killed.
Isis	Germany	World War II: The cargo ship was torpedoed and sunk by Allied aircraft 3 nautical miles (5.6 km) west of Navarino, Greece.
Kimishima Maru	Imperial Japanese Navy	World War II: Convoy No. 4220: The Kimishima Maru-class auxiliary transport was torpedoed and sunk in the Pacific Ocean 32 nautical miles (59 km) north east of Torishima, Izu Islands (30°11′N 140°49′E) by USS Plunger (United States Navy). Ten troops and Four crewmen were killed.
Koyo Maru	Imperial Japanese Navy	World War II: Convoy No. 4220: The Koyo Maru-class auxiliary transport was torpedoed and sunk in the Pacific Ocean 120 miles (190 km) north north west of Chichijima, Bonin Islands (28°49′N 141°13′E) by USS Snook (United States Navy). A total of 1,046 troops and 34 crewmen were killed. CH-42 (Imperial Japanese Navy) rescued 142 survivors.
Kyo Maru No. 8 Go	Imperial Japanese Navy	The auxiliary submarine chaser was lost on this date.
Kyo Maru No. 10 Go	Imperial Japanese Navy	The auxiliary submarine chaser was lost on this date.
Ogura Maru No. 3	Imperial Japanese Navy	World War II: The Ogura Maru No. 3-class auxiliary oiler was torpedoed and sunk in the Philippine Sea east of Halmahera, Netherlands East Indies (04°23′N 129°05′E) by USS Cod (United States Navy). The commanding officer and sixteen crewmen were killed.
R-187	Kriegsmarine	World War II: The Type R-151 minesweeper was damaged by Allied aircraft at Rogoznica, Yugoslavia. She was taken to Pola for repairs but sank there. She was later raised.
S 94	Kriegsmarine	The Type 1939/40 Schnellboot was sunk in a collision with S 128 (Kriegsmarine) in the North Sea (52°48′N 2°20′W).
S 128	Kriegsmarine	The Type 1939/40 Schnellboot was sunk in a collision with S 94 (Kriegsmarine) in the North Sea (52°48′N 2°20′W).
Seizan Maru	Japan	World War II: The cargo ship was sunk in the South China Sea (15°00′N 145°30′E) by United States Navy carrier-based aircraft.
Shin Yubari Maru	Imperial Japanese Navy	World War II: The Shin Yubari Maru-class auxiliary collier was torpedoed and sunk in the Pacific Ocean west of Saipan (15°13′N 146°02′E) by USS Sunfish (United States Navy). Seven crewmen were killed. Some survivors were rescued by fishing boats, a submarine rescued more ten days later.
Yamashimo Maru	Imperial Japanese Navy	World War II: The Aratama Maru-class auxiliary repair ship (6,777 GRT) was torpedoed and sunk in the Pacific Ocean north of Saipan (14°45′N 144°32′E) by USS Tang (United States Navy). The commanding officer and three crewmen were killed.

== 24 February ==
List of shipwrecks: 24 February 1944
Ship	State	Description
Cymric	Ireland	The schooner (228 GRT, 1893) was sighted in the Irish Sea off Dublin. No further trace.
Echizen Maru	Imperial Japanese Navy	World War II: The Echizen Maru-class cargo ship was torpedoed and sunk in the Pacific Ocean west of Saipan (15°15′N 143°18′E) by USS Tang (United States Navy). 35 crew were killed.
Krischan der Grosse	Kriegsmarine	World War II: The Krischan der Grosse-class anti-aircraft ship was sunk by Allied bomber aircraft off Antwerp.
Kunishima Maru	Imperial Japanese Navy	The Toyo Maru-class transport ran aground in dense fog and was wrecked in the Kumanonada Sea 8 nautical miles (15 km) southwest of Daiosaki Lighthouse (34°12′N 136°49′E). Declared a constructive total loss.
HMS LCP(L) 152	Royal Navy	The landing craft personnel (large) was lost on this date.
Nampo Maru	Imperial Japanese Navy	World War II: Convoy HI-40: The standard merchant Type 1 TL oiler (a.k.a. Nanho Maru and Nanpo Maru) was torpedoed and sunk in the Pacific Ocean 20 nautical miles (37 km) east of Formosa (24°20′N 122°25′E) by USS Grayback (United States Navy). 37 crewmen, 12 gunners and two passengers were killed.
U-257	Kriegsmarine	World War II: The Type VIIC submarine was depth charged and sunk in the Atlantic Ocean (47°19′N 26°00′W) by HMS Nene (Royal Navy) and HMCS Waskesiu (Royal Canadian Navy) with the loss of nineteen of her 49 crew.
U-761	Kriegsmarine	World War II: The Type VIIC submarine was detected transiting the Strait of Gibraltar by a Consolidated PBY Catalina aircraft of the United States Navy that was equipped with Magnetic Anomaly Detector (MAD) gear. The Catalina, along with a Royal Air Force Catalina and a Lockheed PV-1 Ventura, bombed and damaged the U-boat. When intercepted in the Atlantic Ocean off Tangier, Morocco by HMS Anthony and HMS Wishart (both Royal Navy) she was scuttled by her crew. Nine of her 57 crew were lost. She was the first submarine sunk through use of MAD gear.
USS YC-523	United States Navy	The non self-propelled covered lighter ran aground and sank off Portsmouth, New Hampshire.

== 25 February ==
List of shipwrecks: 25 February 1944
Ship	State	Description
Choko Maru	Imperial Japanese Navy	World War II: The Manko Maru-class auxiliary storeship (1,792 GRT 1924) was torpedoed and sunk in the Pacific Ocean about 97 nautical miles (180 km; 112 mi) west north west of Saipan (15°46′N 144°10′E) by USS Tang (United States Navy). Eight crew were killed.
HMCS Columbia	Royal Canadian Navy	The Wickes-class destroyer (1,060/1,530 t, 1919) ran aground off Newfoundland. She was subsequently used as a hulk.
El Coston	Panama	World War II: Convoy CU 15: The cargo ship collided in the Atlantic Ocean with Murfreesboro (United States). Both ships caught fire. El Coston was then rammed by USS Marchand (United States Navy). All 117 crew from both ships were rescued by USS Marchand and USS Ricketts (United States Navy). Murfreesboro sank that day, El Coston sank the next day.
HMS Inglefield	Royal Navy	World War II: The I-class destroyer (1,544/2,081 t, 1937) was sunk by a German glide bomb off Anzio, Lazio, Italy. 35 crew were killed.
Isora	Greece	World War II: The cargo ship was torpedoed and sunk in the Ionian Sea off Pylos by British aircraft.
USS LCT-26	United States Navy	The LCT Mk 5-class landing craft tank foundered in a storm off Anzio.
HMS Mahratta	Royal Navy	World War II: Convoy JW 57: The M-class destroyer (1,920/2,725 t, 1943) was torpedoed and sunk in the Arctic Ocean off Nordkapp, Norway by U-990 (Kriegsmarine) with the loss of 220 of her 236 crew.
Nisshō Maru	Imperial Japanese Navy	World War II: The auxiliary oiler was torpedoed and sunk 75 nautical miles (139 km) south of Davao, Mindanao (05°50′N 126°00′E) by USS Hoe (United States Navy). Her commanding officer and 37 crewmen were killed.
Philipp M.	United Kingdom	World War II: Convoy FS 1371: The cargo ship (2,085 GRT, 1924) was torpedoed and sunk in the North Sea off the coast of Norfolk (52°45′N 2°2′E) by a Kriegsmarine Schnellboot with a loss of seven of her 25 crew.
R 52	Kriegsmarine	World War II: The R 41 Type minesweeper was destroyed by fire in an Allied air raid on Dieppe, Seine-Inférieure, France.
Ryusei Maru	Imperial Japanese Army	World War II: The Ryusei Maru-class auxiliary transport ship was torpedoed and sunk in the Java Sea (07°41′N 115°10′E) by USS Rasher (United States Navy). An unknown number of troops and prisoners of war and about 3,000 Javanese and 34 crew were killed.
Tango Maru	Japan	World War II: The cargo ship was torpedoed and sunk in the Java Sea (07°55′N 115°15′E) by USS Rasher (United States Navy). An unknown number of troops & POWs, 3000 coolies, and 34 crew are killed.
Toshin Maru	Japan	World War II: The tanker was torpedoed and sunk in the East China Sea by USS Grayback (United States Navy).
U-601	Kriegsmarine	World War II: The Type VIIC submarine was depth charged and sunk in the Arctic Ocean (70°26′N 12°40′E) by a Consolidated PBY Catalina aircraft of 210 Squadron, Royal Air Force with the loss of all 51 crew.

== 26 February ==
List of shipwrecks: 26 February 1944
Ship	State	Description
USS Ailanthus	United States Navy	The Ailanthus-class net laying ship was driven ashore and wrecked in a storm while at anchor at Attu Island in the Aleutian Islands. She was declared a total loss and on 9 June was stricken from the Navy list.
Astrolabe	(France) Vichy French Navy	World War II: The survey ship was bombed and sunk at Tourane, French Indochina by North American B-25 Mitchell aircraft of the United States Fourteenth Air Force. Three crewmen were killed.
Daigen Maru No.3	Japan	World War II: The cargo ship was torpedoed and sunk in the Pacific Ocean off Truk, South Pacific Mandate by USS Gato (United States Navy). 554 troops of the IJA's 66th Infantry Regiment and 23 crewmen were killed.
Directeur General Picanon	(France) Vichy French Navy	The auxiliary minesweeper was bombed and sunk at Tourane, French Indochina by North American B-25 Mitchell aircraft of the United States Fourteenth Air Force. Two crewmen were killed.
Gilmot	(France) Vichy French Navy	World War II: The dredge was bombed and sunk in the South China Seoff Tourane by North American B-25 Mitchell aircraft of the United States Fourteenth Air Force.
Hurja	Finnish Navy	World War II: Continuation War: The Sisu-class motor torpedo boat was sunk at Helsinki by Soviet aircraft.
USS LCT-36	United States Navy	The LCT Mk 5-class landing craft tank ran aground and sank off Naples, Italy.
USS LST-349	United States Navy	The LST Mk 2-class landing ship tank was wrecked off Isola di Ponza, Italy (40°55′N 12°58′E).
USS PT-251	United States Navy	World War II: The Higgins 78'-class PT boat was sunk in Empress Augusta Bay, Bouganville (06°30′S 155°10′E) by Japanese shore batteries after running aground whilst pursuing Japanese barges.
Silvermaple	United Kingdom	World War II: Convoy STL 12: The cargo ship (5,313 GRT, 1927) was torpedoed and sunk in the Gulf of Guinea (4°44′N 3°20′W) by U-66 (Kriegsmarine) with the loss of seven of her 67 crew. Survivors were rescued by HMS Kildwick (Royal Navy).
Sutlej	United Kingdom	World War II: The cargo ship (5,189 GRT, 1940) was torpedoed and sunk in the Indian Ocean (08°00′S 70°00′E) by I-37 (Imperial Japanese Navy) with the loss of nine gunners and 41 crew of the 73 people on board when I-37 machine gunned the lifeboats. One gunner and ten crewmen were rescued by HMS Solvra (Royal Navy) 42 days later. One gunner and eleven crewmen were rescued by HMS Flamingo (Royal Navy) 46 days later. Sutlej was on a voyage from Aden, Aden Protectorate to Fremantle, Western Australia.
William H. Welch	United States	The Liberty ship ran aground in Loch Ewe, United Kingdom in a storm. She broke in two and was declared a total loss.
U-91	Kriegsmarine	World War II: The Type VIIC submarine was depth charged and sunk in the Atlantic Ocean (49°45′N 26°20′W) by HMS Affleck, HMS Gore and HMS Gould (all Royal Navy) with the loss of 36 of her 52 crew.
VMV-8	Merivoimat	World War II: Continuation War: The VMV-8-class patrol boat was sunk at Helsinki by Soviet aircraft.

== 27 February ==
List of shipwrecks: 27 February 1944
Ship	State	Description
Cesteriano	Panama	World War II: The tanker was torpedoed and damaged east of Saint-Tropez, Var, France by HMS Universal (Royal Navy). Cesteriano was towed in to Toulon, Var.
Ceylon Maru	Imperial Japanese Army	World War II: Convoy TAMO-05: The Ceylon Maru-class transport was torpedoed and sunk in the East China Sea off Ojika Island, north east Kyushu (31°35′N 127°47′E) by USS Grayback (United States Navy). Ninety-five troops and 46 crewmen were killed.
FS-132	United States Army	The coastal freighter (2,904 GRT, 1918) burned and sank at Prince Rupert, British Columbia.
USS Grayback	United States Navy	World War II: The Tambor-class submarine was depth charged and sunk in the East China Sea (25°47′N 128°45′E) by Japanese aircraft with the loss of all 60 crew.
HMS MFV 70	Royal Navy	The motor fishing vessel (43 GRT, 1943) struck a submerged wreck and sank in the Mediterranean Sea off Castellorizo, Italy.
Omaha	Panama	The cargo ship ran aground on the Egret Reef, 7 nautical miles (13 km) east of Monkhouse Point, Queensland, Australia. She was refloated on 6 March and taken in to Cairns, where she was condemned.
President Grant	United States	The War Shipping Administration troop transport bound for Milne Bay grounded on Uluma Reef about 70 nautical miles (130 km) off the coast of New Guinea (11°07′N 150°58′E) and was a constructive total loss after removal of all personnel and part of the cargo.
Rod el Farag	Egypt	World War II: The sailing ship (55 GRT) was shelled and sunk in the Mediterranean Sea off Beirut, Lebanon (33°48′N 34°51′E) by U-407 (Kriegsmarine). All crew survived.
Taisoku Maru	Imperial Japanese Army	World War II: The Taisoku Maru-class auxiliary transport (2,473 GRT) was torpedoed and sunk in the Pacific Ocean west of Halmahera, Malaku Islands (02°00′S 127°40′E) by USS Cod (United States Navy). 35 passengers and 42 crew were killed.

== 28 February ==
List of shipwrecks: 28 February 1944
Ship	State	Description
Akiura Maru	Imperial Japanese Army	World War II: The Akiura Maru-class auxiliary transport ship was torpedoed and sunk in the Pacific Ocean 90 miles (140 km) north west of Manokawarki, New Guinea (00°15′N 132°53′E) by USS Balao (United States Navy). 497 troops, 10 gunners and 55 crewmen were killed. Survivors were rescued by Toyo Maru (Japan).
Giuseppe Cesira	Nazi Germany	World War II: The transport boat, that had run aground on rocks previously, was captured by Yugoslav Partizans and scuttled by burning.
Haraelis	Nazi Germany	World War II: The transport boat was sunk in a gun battle with the patrol boats PC-2 Makola and PC-3 Skampo ( Yugoslav Partisans).
KEMTSchch-34	Soviet Navy	The K-15/M-17-class river minesweeping launch was sunk on this date.
Kaiko Maru	Imperial Japanese Navy	World War II: The Kaiko Maru-class transport was torpedoed and sunk in Noda Anchorage, Paramushiro (50°02′N 155°26′E) by USS Sand Lance (United States Navy). Her commanding officer and two crewmen were killed.
M-108	Soviet Navy	World War II: The M-class submarine struck a mine and sank in Kongsfjord.
Maria Jose	Nazi Germany	World War II: The transport boat was sunk in a gun battle with the patrol boats PC-2 Makola and PC-3 Skampo ( Yugoslav Partisans).
Promontore	Italy	World War II: The cargo ship was bombed and sunk at Split, Yugoslavia in an Allied air raid.
Sakura Maru No. 1	Imperial Japanese Army	World War II: The transport ship was torpedoed and sunk in the Strait of Malacca off Penang, Malaya by HMS Tactician (Royal Navy).
Shoho Maru	Imperial Japanese Army	World War II: The Mikage Maru No. 20-class auxiliary transport ship (2,723 GRT 1941) was torpedoed and sunk in the Pacific Ocean 90 miles (140 km) north west of Manokawarki, New Guinea (00°15′N 132°53′E) by USS Balao (United States Navy). 34 killed. Survivors were rescued by Toyo Maru (Japan).
Utide Maru	Japan	World War II: The cargo ship was torpedoed and sunk in the Pacific Ocean (8°57′N 132°52′E) by USS Sargo (United States Navy).
V 1309 Kapitän Stemmer	Kriegsmarine	The Vorpostenboot collided with V 811 Hugo Homann (Kriegsmarine) and sank in the North Sea off Hook of Holland, South Holland, Netherlands with the loss of four lives.

== 29 February ==
List of shipwrecks: 29 February 1944
Ship	State	Description
Ascot	United Kingdom	World War II: The cargo ship (7,005 GRT, 1942) was torpedoed and sunk in the Indian Ocean 800 nautical miles (1,500 km) north east of Diego Suarez, Madagascar (05°00′S 63°00′E) by I-37 (Imperial Japanese Navy) with the loss of most of the crew when I-37 machine gunned and sank the lifeboats. Three gunners and four crewmen were rescued by Straat Soenda (Netherlands) on 3 March. Ascot was on a voyage from Calcutta, India to Mauritius.
Behar	United Kingdom	World War II, Japanese Indian Ocean Raid: The cargo ship was shelled and sunk in the Indian Ocean by the cruiser (Tone (Imperial Japanese Navy). Behar was on a voyage from Melbourne, Australia to Bombay, India.
Chietti	Italy	World War II: The cargo ship was torpedoed and sunk in the Mediterranean Sea off Cape Cépet, Var, France (43°02′N 5°19′E) by HMS Uproar (Royal Navy).
Käpitan Diederichsen	Germany	World War II: Battle of Ist: The cargo ship was shelled and sunk in the Adriatic Sea by Le Terrible (Free French Naval Forces).
Kelkheim	Germany	The cargo ship was sunk in a collision south of Rautingen, Norway.
HMS LCP(L) 541	Royal Navy	The landing craft personnel (large) was lost on this date.
Palma	United Kingdom	World War II: The cargo ship (5,419 GRT, 1941) was torpedoed and sunk in the Laccadive Sea 400 nautical miles (740 km) south of Ceylon (5°51′N 79°38′E) by U-183 (Kriegsmarine) with the loss of seven of her 53 crew. Survivors were rescued by HMS Balta and HMT Semla (both Royal Navy). Palma was on a voyage from Liverpool, Lancashire to Calcutta, India.
R-194	Kriegsmarine	World War II: The Type R-151 minesweeper was sunk by Allied aircraft off Corfu, Greece.
Riga	Germany	The cargo ship was wrecked off Kirkenes, Norway.
Sakito Maru	Imperial Japanese Army	World War II: Matsu Maru Transportation Convoy: The Sakito Maru-class auxiliary transport ship (a.k.a. Sakido Maru) was torpedoed and damaged in the East China Sea by USS Trout (United States Navy). She sank on 1 March at 22°40′N 131°50′E. 2,358 soldiers, 65 ship’s gunners and 52 crewmen were killed, including the 18th Infantry's regimental commander. Asashimo and Okinami (both Imperial Japanese Navy), rescued 1,688 survivors and delivered them to Saipan.
TID 51	United Kingdom	The TID-class tug capsized and sank in the North Sea. She was being towed from Harwich, Essex to Hull, Yorkshire.
USS Trout	United States Navy	World War II: Matsu Maru Transportation Convoy: The Tambor-class submarine was depth charged and sunk in the East China Sea (22°40′N 131°45′E) by Asashimo (Imperial Japanese Navy) with the loss of all 81 crew.
UJ 201	Kriegsmarine	World War II: Battle of Ist: The submarine chaser, a former Gabbiano-class corvette, was sunk by Le Fantasque and Le Terrible (both Free French Naval Forces) in the Adriatic Sea.
Uchide Maru	Imperial Japanese Army	World War II: Convoy TAPA-02: The British WWI B Class standard cargo ship was torpedoed and damaged in the Pacific Ocean 120 miles (190 km) north of Palau (08°57′N 132°52′E) by USS Sargo (United States Navy). She was abandoned on 1 March, her crew being taken off by Sagi and PB-31 (both Imperial Japanese Navy). She sank on 2 March.

== Unknown date ==
List of shipwrecks: Unknown date 1944
Ship	State	Description
A C C #50	United States	The 7-gross register ton, 32.1-foot (9.8 m) scow was destroyed by fire in Lynn Canal in Southeast Alaska.
F 770	Kriegsmarine	World War II: The Marinefährprahm was damaged in an Allied air raid on Porto Ercole or Livorno on 14, 17 or 18 January and was beached.
KT 31	Kriegsmarine	World War II: The Kriegstransporter was sunk in an Allied air raid on Porto Ercole or Livorno on 14, 17 or 18 February.
HMS LCM 192	Royal Navy	The landing craft mechanized was lost in British home waters.
HMS LCM 234	Royal Navy	The landing craft mechanized was lost in British home waters.
HMS LCM 254	Royal Navy	The landing craft mechanized was lost in British home waters.
HMS LCM 270	Royal Navy	The landing craft mechanized was lost.
HMS LCM 279	Royal Navy	The landing craft mechanized was lost in British home waters.
HMS LCM 282	Royal Navy	The landing craft mechanized was lost in British home waters.
HMS LCM 327	Royal Navy	The landing craft mechanized was lost in British home waters.
HMS LCM 329	Royal Navy	The landing craft mechanized was lost in British home waters.
HMS LCM 367	Royal Navy	The landing craft mechanized was lost in British home waters.
HMS LCT 375	Royal Navy	The landing craft tank was lost in the Mediterranean Sea.
HMS LCV 894	Royal Navy	The landing craft vehicle was lost while in service with the Royal Army Service Corps at Rothesay, Scotland.
HMS LCV(P) 1066	Royal Navy	World War II: The landing craft vehicle and personnel was lost in the vicinity of Richborough, Kent, England, during an exercise.
USS Onyx	United States Navy	The armed yacht was in collision with another vessel and was severely damaged. She was consequently withdrawn from service and designated as a target ship.
R 39	Kriegsmarine	World War II: The R 25-class mineseeper was sunk in an Allied air raid on Porto Ercole or Livorno on 14, 17 or 18 February.
Shoan Maru	Imperial Japanese Navy	World War II: The Shoan Maru-class transport was torpedoed and damaged by the submarine USS Whale (United States Navy) on 27 January 1943. She spent the next year under repair and was damaged again by bombing on 14 January 1944, then was bombed and damaged beyond repair by aircraft from the aircraft carriers USS Essex and USS Yorktown (both United States Navy) on 23 February 1944 and abandoned. She sank either in February 1944 or during the June 1944 Battle of Saipan.
Taiyo Maru	Imperial Japanese Navy	World War II: Battle of Kwajalein: The Tenyo Maru-class naval trawler/auxiliary storeship was strafed by United States Navy aircraft near Eller Island, Kwajalein Atoll and subsequently is beached at Eller Island between 28 January and 1 February. On 5 February the ship fired machine guns at troops of the 17th US Infantry Regiment on the island. The next day the vessel was machine gunned by USS LCI-438 (United States Navy). Nine crew were killed on board, the rest of the crew were killed by US troops on the island.
USS Thompson	United States Navy	The Clemson-class destroyer was scuttled in shallow water in San Francisco Bay in California for use as a training target.
UJ 207	Kriegsmarine	World War II: The submarine chaser, a former Gabbiano-class corvette, was sunk by Allied aircraft at Breda, Girona, Italy.
Unknown ships	Imperial Japanese Navy	World War II: Battle of Kwajalein: Two tugboats or picket boats were strafed by United States Navy aircraft near Eller Island, Kwajalein Atoll and were subsequently beached at Eller Island between 28 January and 1 February. On 2 February one of them was shelled by USS YMS-90 and USS YMS-383 (both United States Navy). On 5 February the beached ships fired machine guns at troops of the United States 17th Infantry Regiment on the island. The crews of the vessels were killed by US troops on the island.
V 712 Chemnitz	Kriegsmarine	The Vorpostenboot was lost.
