= German submarine U-453 =

German world war II submarine

History

Nazi Germany
- Name: U-453
- Ordered: 30 October 1939
- Builder: Deutsche Werke, Kiel
- Yard number: 284
- Laid down: 4 July 1940
- Launched: 30 April 1941
- Commissioned: 26 June 1941
- Fate: Sunk by depth charges on 21 May 1944

General characteristics
- Class & type: Type VIIC submarine
- Displacement: 769 tonnes (757 long tons) surfaced; 871 t (857 long tons) submerged
- Length: 67.10 m (220 ft 2 in) o/a; 50.50 m (165 ft 8 in) pressure hull
- Beam: 6.20 m (20 ft 4 in) o/a; 4.70 m (15 ft 5 in) pressure hull
- Height: 9.60 m (31 ft 6 in)
- Draught: 4.74 m (15 ft 7 in)
- Installed power: 2,800–3,200 PS (2,100–2,400 kW; 2,800–3,200 bhp) (diesels); 750 PS (550 kW; 740 shp) (electric)
- Propulsion: 2 shafts; 2 × diesel engines; 2 × electric motors
- Speed: 17.7 knots (32.8 km/h; 20.4 mph) surfaced; 7.6 knots (14.1 km/h; 8.7 mph) submerged
- Range: 8,500 nmi (15,700 km; 9,800 mi) at 10 knots (19 km/h; 12 mph) surfaced; 80 nmi (150 km; 92 mi) at 4 knots (7.4 km/h; 4.6 mph) submerged
- Test depth: 230 m (750 ft); Crush depth: 250–295 m (820–968 ft)
- Complement: 4 officers, 40–56 enlisted
- Armament: 5 × 53.3 cm (21 in) torpedo tubes (four bow, one stern); 14 × torpedoes or 26 TMA mines; 1 × 8.8 cm (3.46 in) deck gun (220 rounds); 1 x 2 cm (0.79 in) C/30 AA gun

Service record
- Part of: 7th U-boat Flotilla; 26 June – 31 December 1941; 29th U-boat Flotilla; 1 January 1942 – 21 May 1944
- Identification codes: M 43 787
- Commanders: Kptlt. Gert Hetschko; 26 June – 8 July 1941; Kptlt. Egon-Reiner von Schlippenbach; 9 July 1941 – 6 December 1943; Oblt.z.S. Dierk Lührs; 7 December 1943 – 21 May 1944
- Operations: 17 patrols: 1st patrol: 12 November – 17 December 1941; 2nd patrol: 17 January – 1 February 1942; 3rd patrol: 22 March – 21 April 1942; 4th patrol: 25 May – 14 June 1942; 5th patrol: a. 18 June – 21 July 1942; b. 31 August – 10 September 1942; 6th patrol: 17 September – 15 October 1942; 7th patrol: 29 November – 17 December 1942; 8th patrol: 11 January – 16 February 1943; 9th patrol: 1 April – 5 May 1943; 10th patrol: 23 June – 24 July 1943; 11th patrol: 31 July – 14 August 1943; 12th patrol: 21 – 27 October 1943; 13th patrol: 2 – 13 November 1943; 14th patrol: 24 November – 1 December 1943; 15th patrol: 12 January – 9 February 1944; 16th patrol: 8 – 25 March 1944; 17th patrol: 30 April – 21 May 1944
- Victories: 9 merchant ships sunk (23,289 GRT); 1 warship sunk (835 tons); 1 warship total loss (1,705 tons); 1 merchant ship damaged (6,894 GRT); 1 auxiliary warship damaged (9,716 GRT)

German submarine U-453 was a Type VIIC U-boat built for Nazi Germany's Kriegsmarine for service during World War II. She was laid down on 4 July 1940 by Deutsche Werke in Kiel as yard number 284, launched on 30 April 1941 and commissioned on 26 June 1941 under Kapitänleutnant Egon-Reiner von Schlippenbach (Knight's Cross).

The boat's service began on 26 June 1941 with training as part of the 7th U-boat Flotilla, followed by active service until being transferred to the 29th flotilla on 1 January 1942, based in La Spezia in Italy.

== Design ==
German Type VIIC submarines were preceded by the shorter Type VIIB submarines. U-453 had a displacement of 769 tonnes (757 long tons) when at the surface and 871 tonnes (857 long tons) while submerged. She had a total length of 67.10 m (220 ft 2 in), a pressure hull length of 50.50 m (165 ft 8 in), a beam of 6.20 m (20 ft 4 in), a height of 9.60 m (31 ft 6 in), and a draught of 4.74 m (15 ft 7 in). The submarine was powered by two Germaniawerft F46 four-stroke, six-cylinder supercharged diesel engines producing a total of 2,800 to 3,200 metric horsepower (2,060 to 2,350 kW; 2,760 to 3,160 shp) for use while surfaced, two Siemens-Schuckert GU 343/38–8 double-acting electric motors producing a total of 750 metric horsepower (550 kW; 740 shp) for use while submerged. She had two shafts and two 1.23 m (4 ft) propellers. The boat was capable of operating at depths of up to 230 metres (750 ft).

The submarine had a maximum surface speed of 17.7 knots (32.8 km/h; 20.4 mph) and a maximum submerged speed of 7.6 knots (14.1 km/h; 8.7 mph). When submerged, the boat could operate for 80 nautical miles (150 km; 92 mi) at 4 knots (7.4 km/h; 4.6 mph); when surfaced, she could travel 8,500 nautical miles (15,700 km; 9,800 mi) at 10 knots (19 km/h; 12 mph). U-453 was fitted with five 53.3 cm (21 in) torpedo tubes (four fitted at the bow and one at the stern), fourteen torpedoes, one 8.8 cm (3.46 in) SK C/35 naval gun, 220 rounds, and a 2 cm (0.79 in) C/30 anti-aircraft gun. The boat had a complement of between forty-four and sixty.

== Service history ==
In 17 patrols she sank nine merchant ships for a total of 23,289 gross register tons (GRT), plus one warship, damaged one merchant ship, one auxiliary warship and cause one warship total loss.

=== Fate ===
She was depth charged and sunk by on 21 May 1944 off the south coast of Italy at position 38°13′N 16°30′E by Royal Navy destroyers HMS Termagant, HMS Tenacious and the escort destroyer HMS Liddesdale.

== Summary of raiding history ==
Date	Ship Name	Nationality	Tonnage (Note: Merchant ship tonnages are in gross register tons. Military vessels are listed by tons displacement.)	Fate
13 December 1941	Badalona	Spain	4,202	Sunk
7 April 1942	HMHS Somersetshire	Royal Navy	9,716	Damaged
20 January 1943	Jean Jadot	Belgium	5,859	Sunk
30 June 1943	Oligarch	United Kingdom	6,894	Damaged
6 July 1943	Shahjehan	United Kingdom	5,454	Sunk
15 November 1943	HMS Quail	Royal Navy	1,705	Total loss (mine)
20 November 1943	Jela	Yugoslavia	335	Sunk (mine)
22 November 1943	HMS Hebe	Royal Navy	835	Sunk (mine)
1 February 1944	Agia Paraskevi	Greece	80	Sunk
1 February 1944	Salem	Lebanon	81	Sunk
1 February 1944	Himli	Lebanon	67	Sunk
1 February 1944	Yahiya	Syria	64	Sunk
19 May 1944	Fort Missanabie	United Kingdom	7,147	Sunk

== Bibliography ==
- Busch, Rainer; Röll, Hans-Joachim (1999). German U-boat commanders of World War II : a biographical dictionary. Translated by Brooks, Geoffrey. London, Annapolis, Md: Greenhill Books, Naval Institute Press. ISBN 1-55750-186-6.
- Busch, Rainer; Röll, Hans-Joachim (1999). Deutsche U-Boot-Verluste von September 1939 bis Mai 1945 [German U-boat losses from September 1939 to May 1945]. Der U-Boot-Krieg (in German). Vol. IV. Hamburg, Berlin, Bonn: Mittler. ISBN 3-8132-0514-2.
- Gröner, Erich; Jung, Dieter; Maass, Martin (1991). U-boats and Mine Warfare Vessels. German Warships 1815–1945. Vol. 2. Translated by Thomas, Keith; Magowan, Rachel. London: Conway Maritime Press. ISBN 0-85177-593-4.
