= SS Empire Dabchick =

World War II merchant ship of the United Kingdom

History
- Name: Kisnop (1919–1941); Empire Dabchick (1941–1942)
- Owner: United States Shipping Board (1919–1937); United States Maritime Commission (1937–1940); Ministry of War Transport (1941–1942)
- Operator: United States Shipping Board (1919–1937); United States Maritime Commission (1937–1940); William Reardon Smith & Sons (1940–1941); J Morrison & Son (1941–1942)
- Port of registry: Portsmouth, United States (1919–1940); London, United Kingdom (1940–1942)
- Builder: Atlantic Corporation
- Yard number: 1
- Launched: 18 January 1919
- Completed: August 1919
- Out of service: 3 December 1942
- Identification: United Kingdom Official Number 168184 (1940–1942); Code Letters GNSN (1940–1942)
- Fate: Torpedoed and sunk

General characteristics
- Class & type: Design 1019 cargo ship
- Tonnage: 6,089 GRT (1919–1940); 5,995 GRT (1940–1942); 4,549 NRT (1940–1942)
- Length: 410 ft 2 in (125.02 m) between perpendiculars; 426 ft 10 in (130.10 m) overall
- Beam: 54 ft 2 in (16.51 m)
- Depth: 27 ft 0 in (8.23 m)
- Propulsion: Triple expansion steam engine
- Speed: 11 knots (20 km/h)
- Complement: 36, plus 11 DEMS gunners (Empire Dabchick)

Location of the sinking of Empire Dabchick off Canada.

Empire Dabchick was a 5,995 GRT Design 1019 cargo ship that was built in 1919 as Kisnop by Atlantic Corporation, Portsmouth, New Hampshire, United States for the United States Shipping Board (USSB). She was transferred to the United States Maritime Commission (USMC) in 1937. In 1940 she was transferred to the Ministry of War Transport (MoWT) and renamed Empire Dabchick. She served until December 1942, when she was torpedoed and sunk by German submarine U-183.

== Description ==
The ship was built in 1919 by Atlantic Corporation, Portsmouth, New Hampshire. She was yard number 1.

The ship was 426 feet 10 inches (130.10 m) overall, 410 feet 2 inches (125.02 m) long between perpendiculars, She had a beam of 54 feet 2 inches (16.51 m), with a depth of 27 feet 0 inches (8.23 m). As built, she was assessed at 6,089 GRT,

The ship was propelled by a 359 nhp triple expansion steam engine, which had cylinders of 24 1/2 inches (62 cm), 41 1/2 inches (105 cm) and 72 inches (180 cm) diameter by 48 inches (120 cm) stroke. The engine was built by Atlantic Corporation, Taunton, Massachusetts. It drove a screw propeller and could propel the ship at 11 knots (20 km/h).

== History ==
Kisnop was launched in 1919, and completed in August of that year. She was built for the USSB and was transferred to the USMC in 1937. Her port of registry was Portsmouth, New Hampshire. On transfer to the USMC, Kisnop was laid up in reserve.

On 14 November 1940, Kisnop was given to the United Kingdom, passing to the MoWT. She was renamed Empire Dabchick and placed under the management of Sir W Reardon Smith & Sons. The United Kingdom Official Number 168184 and Code Letters GNSN were allocated. Her port of registry was London. She was assessed at 5,995 GRT, 4,549 NRT. Later that year, management was transferred to J Morrison & Son, Newcastle upon Tyne. Kisnop was due to join Convoy HX 116, but did not sail in that convoy, nor in the next convoy, HX 117. Kisnop sailed in Convoy SC 28, which departed from Halifax, Nova Scotia, Canada on 9 April 1941 and arrived at Liverpool, Lancashire, United Kingdom on 28 April. Kisnop was carrying a cargo consisting general and special cargo, iron, steel and trucks. She was bound for Middlesbrough, Yorkshire. She straggled behind the convoy on 19 April and did not rejoin, putting into an Icelandic port.

Kisnop had been renamed Empire Dabchick by 16 June 1941, when she arrived at the Tyne. On 18 June, she joined Convoy FN 494, which departed from Southend-on-Sea, Essex that day and arrived at Methil, Fife two days later. On 22 June, she joined Convoy EC 48, which had departed from Southend on 20 June and arrived at the Clyde on 25 June. Empire Dabchick then sailed to Philadelphia, Pennsylvania, arriving on 16 August. On 13 September, she departed Philadelphia for Sydney, Cape Breton, Canada, arriving on 19 September. She then joined Convoy SC 47, which departed on 29 September and arrived at Liverpool on 20 October. Empire Dabchick was carrying general cargo.

Empire Dabchick was a member of Convoy ON 37, which departed from Liverpool on 15 November and dispersed at sea on 20 November at 59°10′N 20°0′W. She arrived at Halifax on 9 December. On 23 December, she sailed for New York, United States, where she arrived on 26 December. On 18 January, she departed New York for Halifax, arriving on 21 January. She then joined Convoy SC 66, which departed on 23 January and arrived at Liverpool on 9 February. Empire Dabchick was carrying general cargo. She left the convoy at Belfast Lough on 8 February. On 11 February, she joined Convoy BB 136, which arrived at Milford Haven, Pembrokeshire on 13 February. Her destination was Cardiff, Glamorgan, where she arrived that day.

Empire Dabchick departed Cardiff on 1 March for Milford Haven, from where she joined Convoy ON 72, which departed from Liverpool on 3 March and arrived at Halifax on 19 March. She was carrying a cargo of coal. She then joined Convoy XB4, which departed Halifax on 26 March and arrived at Boston, Massachusetts, United States on 29 March. She left the convoy at the Cape Cod Canal on 28 March and sailed to New York, arriving on 1 April. Empire Dabchick then made a voyage to Baltimore, Maryland and back before she departed from New York on 17 April for Halifax, arriving on 20 April. She then joined Convoy SC 81, which departed on 23 April and arrived at Liverpool on 9 May. She was carrying a cargo of steel.

Empire Dabchick was a member of Convoy ON 98, which departed from Liverpool on 26 May and arrived at Halifax on 11 June. Two days later, she departed Halifax for Pubnico, Nova Scotia, arriving the next day. On 16 July, she departed Pubnico for Halifax and New York, where she arrived on 27 July. Empire Dabchick departed from New York on 22 August for Cape Cod Bay, Massachusetts, from where she joined Convoy BX 35, which had departed Boston on 26 August and arrived at Halifax on 29 August. She then joined Convoy SC 98, which departed that day and arrived at Liverpool on 13 September. She was carrying general cargo.

Empire Dabchick was a member of Convoy ON 136, which departed from Liverpool on 3 October and arrived at New York on 26 October. She was carrying the convoy's Vice-Commodore, but she returned to the Clyde, arriving on 6 October. She left the Clyde on 11 October, joining Convoy ON 138, which had departed from Liverpool on 11 October and arrived at New York on 3 November. She again returned to the Clyde, arriving on 16 October. She departed the Clyde on what was to be her final voyage on 15 November, joining Convoy ON 146, which had departed from Liverpool that day and arrived at New York on 8 December. Empire Dabchick straggled behind the convoy. At 09:49 (German time) on 3 December 1942, she was torpedoed and sunk by U-183 some 200 nautical miles (370 km) south east of Sable Island, Nova Scotia, Canada (43°00′N 58°17′W) with the loss of all 36 crew and eleven DEMS gunners. Those lost on Empire Dabchick are commemorated at the Tower Hill Memorial, London.
