= German submarine U-168 =

German World War II submarine

Coordinates: 06.20°S 111.28°E

History

Nazi Germany
- Name: U-168
- Ordered: 15 August 1940
- Builder: DeSchiMAG, Bremen
- Yard number: 707
- Laid down: 15 March 1941
- Launched: 5 March 1942
- Commissioned: 10 September 1942
- Fate: Sunk on 6 October 1944

General characteristics
- Class & type: Type IXC/40 submarine
- Displacement: 1,144 t (1,126 long tons) surfaced; 1,257 t (1,237 long tons) submerged
- Length: 76.76 m (251 ft 10 in) o/a; 58.75 m (192 ft 9 in) pressure hull
- Beam: 6.86 m (22 ft 6 in) o/a; 4.44 m (14 ft 7 in) pressure hull
- Height: 9.60 m (31 ft 6 in)
- Draught: 4.67 m (15 ft 4 in)
- Installed power: 4,400 PS (3,200 kW; 4,300 bhp) (diesels); 1,000 PS (740 kW; 990 shp) (electric)
- Propulsion: 2 shafts; 2 × diesel engines; 2 × electric motors
- Speed: 18.3 knots (33.9 km/h; 21.1 mph) surfaced; 7.3 knots (13.5 km/h; 8.4 mph) submerged
- Range: 13,850 nmi (25,650 km; 15,940 mi) at 10 knots (19 km/h; 12 mph) surfaced; 63 nmi (117 km; 72 mi) at 4 knots (7.4 km/h; 4.6 mph) submerged
- Test depth: 230 m (750 ft)
- Complement: 4 officers, 44 enlisted
- Armament: 6 × torpedo tubes (4 bow, 2 stern); 22 × 53.3 cm (21 in) torpedoes; 1 × 10.5 cm (4.1 in) SK C/32 deck gun (180 rounds); 1 × 3.7 cm (1.5 in) SK C/30 AA gun; 1 × twin 2 cm FlaK 30 AA guns

Service record
- Part of: 4th U-boat Flotilla; 10 September 1942 – 28 February 1943; 2nd U-boat Flotilla; 1 March 1943 – 30 September 1944; 33rd U-boat Flotilla; 1 – 6 October 1944
- Identification codes: M 49 033
- Commanders: Kptlt. Helmuth Pich; 10 September 1942 – 6 October 1944
- Operations: 4 patrols: 1st patrol: 9 March – 18 May 1943; 2nd patrol: a. 3 July – 11 November 1943; b. 28 January – 3 February 1944; 3rd patrol: 7 February – 24 March 1944; 4th patrol: 5 – 6 October 1944
- Victories: 2 merchant ships sunk (6,568 GRT); 1 auxiliary warship sunk (1,440 GRT); 1 merchant ship damaged (9,804 GRT)

German submarine U-168 was a Type IXC/40 U-boat of Nazi Germany's Kriegsmarine built for service during World War II. Her keel was laid down on 15 March 1941 by the Deutsche Schiff- und Maschinenbau AG in Bremen as yard number 707. She was launched on 5 March 1942 and commissioned on 10 September with Kapitänleutnant Helmuth Pich in command.

== Design ==
German Type IXC/40 submarines were slightly larger than the original Type IXCs. U-168 had a displacement of 1,144 tonnes (1,126 long tons) when at the surface and 1,257 tonnes (1,237 long tons) while submerged. The U-boat had a total length of 76.76 m (251 ft 10 in), a pressure hull length of 58.75 m (192 ft 9 in), a beam of 6.86 m (22 ft 6 in), a height of 9.60 m (31 ft 6 in), and a draught of 4.67 m (15 ft 4 in). The submarine was powered by two MAN M 9 V 40/46 supercharged four-stroke, nine-cylinder diesel engines producing a total of 4,400 metric horsepower (3,240 kW; 4,340 shp) for use while surfaced, two Siemens-Schuckert 2 GU 345/34 double-acting electric motors producing a total of 1,000 metric horsepower (740 kW; 990 shp) for use while submerged. She had two shafts and two 1.92 m (6 ft) propellers. The boat was capable of operating at depths of up to 230 metres (750 ft).

The submarine had a maximum surface speed of 18.3 knots (33.9 km/h; 21.1 mph) and a maximum submerged speed of 7.3 knots (13.5 km/h; 8.4 mph). When submerged, the boat could operate for 63 nautical miles (117 km; 72 mi) at 4 knots (7.4 km/h; 4.6 mph); when surfaced, she could travel 13,850 nautical miles (25,650 km; 15,940 mi) at 10 knots (19 km/h; 12 mph). U-168 was fitted with six 53.3 cm (21 in) torpedo tubes (four fitted at the bow and two at the stern), 22 torpedoes, one 10.5 cm (4.13 in) SK C/32 naval gun, 180 rounds, and a 3.7 cm (1.5 in) SK C/30 as well as a 2 cm (0.79 in) C/30 anti-aircraft gun. The boat had a complement of forty-eight.

== Service history ==
U-168 conducted four patrols, sinking three ships totalling 8,008 gross register tons (GRT) and damaging one other grossing 9,804 GRT.

=== First patrol ===
U-168's first patrol commenced with her departure from Kiel on 3 March 1943. Her route took her through the Kattegat and Skaggerak, along the coast of Norway, through the 'gap' between Iceland and the Faroe Islands and into the Atlantic Ocean south and southwest of Greenland. She arrived at Lorient in occupied France on 18 May.

=== Second patrol ===
The boat then moved into the Indian Ocean, sinking the British steam merchant ship SS Haiching 80 nautical miles (150 km; 92 mi) west southwest of Bombay (now Mumbai), on 2 October 1943.

She was unsuccessfully attacked by a Catalina flying boat of No. 413 Squadron RCAF on 3 November. Four 250 lb depth charges were dropped.

The patrol terminated in Penang, Malaya (now Malaysia) on 11 November.

=== Third patrol ===
The submarine began her third and what would turn out to be her most successful patrol when she departed Penang on 7 February 1944. She fired three torpedoes at the British salvage vessel HMS Salviking south of Ceylon (now Sri Lanka) on the 14th. One of the projectiles malfunctioned, but the other two were sufficiently destructive to send the ship to the bottom.

The following day she sank a Greek ship, Epaminondas C. Embiricos about 130 nautical miles (240 km; 150 mi) north of Addu Atoll in the Maldives. The Master and the Chief Engineer were both taken prisoner and handed over to the Japanese. The former's captivity prevented disciplinary action being taken over why he had ordered the undamaged ship to be abandoned and why the vessel was stationary for two hours, despite standing orders to the contrary.

U-168 also damaged the Norwegian Fenris with her last torpedo on the 21st west of the Maldives, but had no ammunition left for her deck gun to finish the ship off which continued to Bombay under her own power.

The boat returned to Batavia (now Jakarta) on 24 March.

=== Fourth patrol and loss ===
The submarine left Batavia on 5 October 1944. According to normal procedures to safeguard friendly submarines the U-168 gave local Japanese units its precise departure and arrival times, intended course and speed. This was subsequently decrypted and included in a FRUMEL report on 5 October 1944. With little time, the Free Dutch Forces submarine HNLMS Zwaardvisch, under the command of Lieutenant Commander H Goosens, was ordered to intercept. Shortly after sunrise on 6 October, while in the Java Sea, U-168 was spotted on steady easterly course and fired upon by a spread of six torpedoes. The torpedoes were spotted mere seconds before impact, being struck by two. One hit the U-168's pressure hull but failed to detonate. The second hit the forward torpedo room and exploded. Attempts to stem the flooding failed and the U-168 sank rapidly. The attack killed 23 men, with a further 27 being captured including Pich. In his interrogation, unaware of Allied code-breaking and signals intelligence, Pich could not explain why he'd been caught unaware with one of his crewmen blaming the Japanese, complaining that they never started anti-submarine air searches before 11:00. Pich later informed the Dutch commander that his submarine was hit three times though only one torpedo exploded.

U-168 is not believed to have made any defensive maneuvers in the action, thus it is likely that the Germans were sunk without realizing they were under attack until the torpedoes hit. The Kriegsmarine was convinced that the sinking of U-168 was the result of "loose talk" due to the crew who brought their Indonesian girlfriends aboard for a goodbye party. They also assumed that the exact position of U-168 was discovered by the Allies long before the engagement, though Dutch reports suggest that they encountered the Germans simply by chance.

In late-2013 divers found what is believed the wreck of the boat though it is pointed out that alternatively it could be the wreck of U-183.

== Summary of raiding history ==
Date	Ship	Nationality	Tonnage (Note: Merchant ship tonnages are in gross register tons. Military vessels are listed by tons displacement.)	Fate
2 October 1943	Haiching	United Kingdom	2,183	Sunk
14 February 1944	HMS Salviking	Royal Navy	1,440	Sunk
15 February 1944	Epaminondas C. Embiricos	Greece	4,385	Sunk
21 February 1944	Fenris	Norway	9,804	Damaged

== Bibliography ==
- Busch, Rainer; Röll, Hans-Joachim (1999). German U-boat commanders of World War II : a biographical dictionary. Translated by Brooks, Geoffrey. London, Annapolis, Md: Greenhill Books, Naval Institute Press. ISBN 1-55750-186-6.
- Busch, Rainer; Röll, Hans-Joachim (1999). Deutsche U-Boot-Verluste von September 1939 bis Mai 1945 [German U-boat losses from September 1939 to May 1945]. Der U-Boot-Krieg (in German). Vol. IV. Hamburg, Berlin, Bonn: Mittler. ISBN 3-8132-0514-2.
- Gröner, Erich; Jung, Dieter; Maass, Martin (1991). U-boats and Mine Warfare Vessels. German Warships 1815–1945. Vol. 2. Translated by Thomas, Keith; Magowan, Rachel. London: Conway Maritime Press. ISBN 0-85177-593-4.
- Kemp, Paul (1999). U-Boats Destroyed - German Submarine Losses in the World Wars. London: Arms & Armour. ISBN 1-85409-515-3.

Sharpe, Peter (1998). U-Boat Fact File. Great Britain: Midland Publishing. ISBN 1-85780-072-9.
