= HMS Stonehenge (P232) =

British S-class submarine

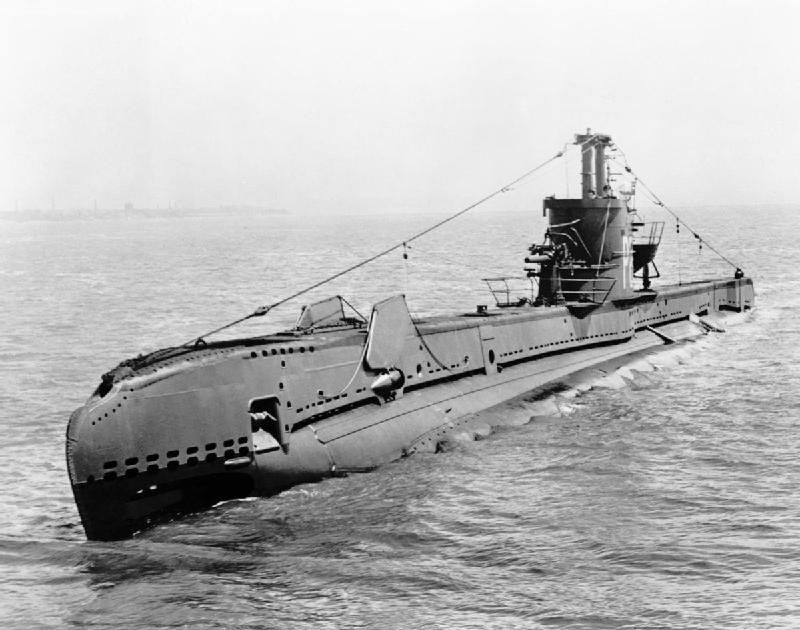
- Stonehenge on the surface

History

United Kingdom
- Name: Stonehenge
- Namesake: Stonehenge
- Ordered: 3 August 1941
- Builder: Cammell Laird, Birkenhead
- Laid down: 4 April 1942
- Launched: 23 March 1943
- Commissioned: 15 June 1943
- Identification: Pennant number: 232
- Fate: Missing after 25 February 1944
- Badge

General characteristics
- Class & type: S-class submarine
- Displacement: 865 long tons (879 t) (surfaced); 990 long tons (1,010 t) (submerged)
- Length: 217 ft (66.1 m)
- Beam: 23 ft 9 in (7.2 m)
- Draught: 14 ft 8 in (4.5 m)
- Installed power: 1,900 bhp (1,400 kW) (diesel); 1,300 hp (970 kW) (electric)
- Propulsion: 2 × diesel engines; 2 × electric motors
- Speed: 15 kn (28 km/h; 17 mph) (surfaced); 10 kn (19 km/h; 12 mph) (submerged)
- Range: 6,000 nmi (11,000 km; 6,900 mi) at 10 knots (19 km/h; 12 mph) (surfaced); 120 nmi (220 km; 140 mi) at 3 knots (5.6 km/h; 3.5 mph) (submerged)
- Test depth: 300 ft (91.4 m)
- Complement: 48
- Sensors & processing systems: Type 129AR or 138 ASDIC; Type 291 early-warning radar
- Armament: 7 × 21 in (533 mm) torpedo tubes (6 × bow, 1 × stern); 1 × 3 in (76 mm) deck gun; 1 × 20 mm (0.8 in) AA gun

HMS Stonehenge was an S-class submarine of the third batch built for the Royal Navy during World War II. Completed in 1943, she made her initial patrol off Norway and was then transferred to the Far East, where she conducted two war patrols, during which she sank two Japanese ships. On her second patrol, Stonehenge disappeared with all hands and was declared overdue on 20 March 1944. The most probable cause of her sinking is that she hit a mine, but her wreck has never been found.

== Design and description ==
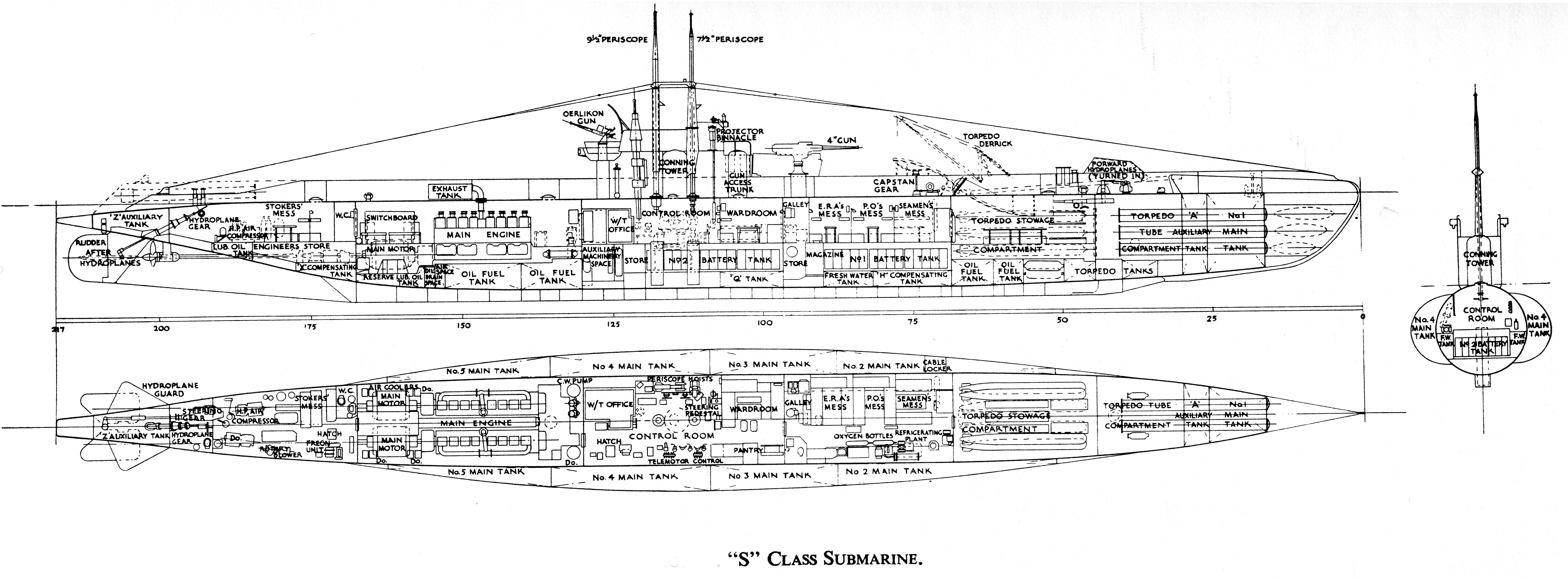
Schematic drawing of a S-class submarine

The S-class submarines were designed to patrol the restricted waters of the North Sea and the Mediterranean Sea. The third batch was slightly enlarged and improved over the preceding second batch of the S class. The submarines had a length of 217 feet (66.1 m) overall, a beam of 23 feet 9 inches (7.2 m) and a draught of 14 feet 8 inches (4.5 m). They displaced 865 long tons (879 t) on the surface and 990 long tons (1,010 t) submerged. The S-class submarines had a crew of 48 officers and ratings. They had a diving depth of 300 feet (91 m).

For surface running, the boats were powered by two 950-brake-horsepower (708 kW) diesel engines, each driving one propeller shaft. When submerged each propeller was driven by a 650-horsepower (485 kW) electric motor. They could reach 15 knots (28 km/h; 17 mph) on the surface and 10 knots (19 km/h; 12 mph) underwater. On the surface, the third-batch boats had a range of 6,000 nautical miles (11,000 km; 6,900 mi) at 10 knots (19 km/h; 12 mph) and 120 nmi (220 km; 140 mi) at 3 knots (5.6 km/h; 3.5 mph) submerged.

The boats were armed with seven 21-inch (533 mm) torpedo tubes. A half-dozen of these were in the bow, and one external tube was mounted in the stern. They carried six reload torpedoes for the bow tubes for a total of thirteen torpedoes. Twelve mines could be carried in lieu of the internally stowed torpedoes. They were also armed with a 3-inch (76 mm) deck gun. It is uncertain if Stonehenge was completed with a 20-millimetre (0.8 in) Oerlikon light AA gun or had one added later. The third-batch S-class boats were fitted with either a Type 129AR or 138 ASDIC system and a Type 291 or 291W early-warning radar.

== Construction and career ==
HMS Stonehenge was a third-group S-class submarine and was ordered as part of the 1941 Naval Programme on 3 August 1941. She was laid down in the Cammell Laird shipyard in Birkenhead on 4 April 1942 and launched on 23 March 1943. On 12 June 1943, Stonehenge, under the command of Lieutenant David S. M. Verschoyle-Campbell, (Note: Full name: David Stuart McNeile Verschoyle-Campbell) sailed to Holy Loch, where she was commissioned into the Royal Navy three days later. Stonehenge was named after the prehistoric monument of Stonehenge and was the second Royal Navy ship with this name.

After training in several port areas, Stonehenge departed Lerwick on 10 September 1943 to patrol off Norway. She ended her patrol two weeks later without having sighted any ships. The boat then departed Great Britain on 5 November and visited Gibraltar, Beirut, and Port Said, then transited the Suez Canal, stopping at Aden and Colombo before arriving at Trincomalee, Ceylon, on 23 January 1944.

On 1 February, Stonehenge departed Trincomalee for her second war patrol. Four days later, she fired two torpedoes at the Japanese merchant ship Koryo Maru No.2, but the torpedoes passed underneath the ship; the submarine surfaced and sank the vessel with her deck gun. On 7 February, the boat launched a landing party at Lem Hua Krung Yai, Siam, then torpedoed and sank the Japanese minelayer Choko Maru west of Malaya five days later. Stonehenge ended her patrol on 18 February.

=== Loss ===
On 25 February 1944, Stonehenge left port to patrol north of the Strait of Malacca and off the Nicobar Islands in the Indian Ocean. She never returned from her patrol, and was declared overdue on 20 March. It is considered likely that she hit a mine, although an accident may also have been the cause of her loss. Her wreck has never been found.

== Summary of raiding history ==
During her service with the Royal Navy, Stonehenge sank 2 Japanese ships for a total of 1,615 GRT.

Date	Name of ship	Tonnage	Nationality	Fate and location
5 February 1944	Koryo Maru No.2	726	Empire of Japan	Sunk with gunfire at 06°14′N 94°58′E
12 February 1944	Choko Maru	889	Imperial Japanese Navy	Torpedoed and sunk at 05°46′N 99°52′E
