= German submarine U-183 =

German World War II submarine

Coordinates: 4.833°S 112.867°E

History

Nazi Germany
- Name: U-183
- Ordered: 15 August 1940
- Builder: DeSchiMAG AG Weser, Bremen
- Yard number: 1023
- Laid down: 28 May 1941
- Launched: 9 January 1942
- Commissioned: 1 April 1942
- Fate: Sunk, 23 April 1945

General characteristics
- Class & type: Type IXC/40 submarine
- Displacement: 1,144 t (1,126 long tons) surfaced; 1,257 t (1,237 long tons) submerged
- Length: 76.76 m (251 ft 10 in) o/a; 58.75 m (192 ft 9 in) pressure hull
- Beam: 6.86 m (22 ft 6 in) o/a; 4.44 m (14 ft 7 in) pressure hull
- Height: 9.60 m (31 ft 6 in)
- Draught: 4.67 m (15 ft 4 in)
- Installed power: 4,400 PS (3,200 kW; 4,300 bhp) (diesels); 1,000 PS (740 kW; 990 shp) (electric)
- Propulsion: 2 shafts; 2 × diesel engines; 2 × electric motors
- Speed: 18.3 knots (33.9 km/h; 21.1 mph) surfaced; 7.3 knots (13.5 km/h; 8.4 mph) submerged
- Range: 13,850 nmi (25,650 km; 15,940 mi) at 10 knots (19 km/h; 12 mph) surfaced; 63 nmi (117 km; 72 mi) at 4 knots (7.4 km/h; 4.6 mph) submerged
- Test depth: 230 m (750 ft)
- Complement: 4 officers, 44 enlisted
- Armament: 6 × torpedo tubes (4 bow, 2 stern); 22 × 53.3 cm (21 in) torpedoes; 1 × 10.5 cm (4.1 in) SK C/32 deck gun (180 rounds); 1 × 3.7 cm (1.5 in) SK C/30 AA gun; 1 × twin 2 cm FlaK 30 AA guns

Service record
- Part of: 4th U-boat Flotilla; 1 April – 30 September 1942; 2nd U-boat Flotilla; 1 October 1942 – 30 September 1944; 33rd U-boat Flotilla; 1 October 1944 – 23 April 1945
- Identification codes: M 44 100
- Commanders: Kptlt. Heinrich Schäfer; 1 April 1942 – 19 November 1943; Kptlt. Fritz Schneewind; 20 November 1943 – 23 April 1945
- Operations: 6 patrols; 1st patrol: 19 September – 23 December 1942; 2nd patrol: 30 January – 13 May 1943; 3rd patrol: a. 3 July – 30 October 1943; b. 10 – 11 November 1943; c. 28 – 30 January 1944; 4th patrol: 10 February – 21 March 1944; 5th patrol: a. 3 – 5 May 1944; b. 17 May – 7 July 1944; c. August 1944; d. 16 – 30 October 1944; e. 22 February – 9 March 1945; 6th patrol: 21 – 23 April 1945
- Victories: 4 merchant ships sunk (19,260 GRT); 1 merchant ship total loss (6,993 GRT)

German submarine U-183 was a Type IXC/40 U-boat of the German Navy (Kriegsmarine) during World War II. She was commissioned on 1 April 1942, one of the first IXC/40 boats, somewhat larger and faster than the IXC type. She began her service life in the 4th U-boat Flotilla, a training organization, moving on to the 2nd, then the 33rd Flotilla, both operational or front outfits.

U-183 was in the first wave of "Monsun boats" or Monsun Gruppe, which operated in the Indian Ocean from Japanese bases in the occupied Dutch East Indies and British Malaya, mostly Penang.

== Design ==
German Type IXC/40 submarines were slightly larger than the original Type IXCs. U-183 had a displacement of 1,144 tonnes (1,126 long tons) when at the surface and 1,257 tonnes (1,237 long tons) while submerged. The U-boat had a total length of 76.76 m (251 ft 10 in), a pressure hull length of 58.75 m (192 ft 9 in), a beam of 6.86 m (22 ft 6 in), a height of 9.60 m (31 ft 6 in), and a draught of 4.67 m (15 ft 4 in). The submarine was powered by two MAN M 9 V 40/46 supercharged four-stroke, nine-cylinder diesel engines producing a total of 4,400 metric horsepower (3,240 kW; 4,340 shp) for use while surfaced, two Siemens-Schuckert 2 GU 345/34 double-acting electric motors producing a total of 1,000 shaft horsepower (1,010 PS; 750 kW) for use while submerged. She had two shafts and two 1.92 m (6 ft) propellers. The boat was capable of operating at depths of up to 230 metres (750 ft).

The submarine had a maximum surface speed of 18.3 knots (33.9 km/h; 21.1 mph) and a maximum submerged speed of 7.3 knots (13.5 km/h; 8.4 mph). When submerged, the boat could operate for 63 nautical miles (117 km; 72 mi) at 4 knots (7.4 km/h; 4.6 mph); when surfaced, she could travel 13,850 nautical miles (25,650 km; 15,940 mi) at 10 knots (19 km/h; 12 mph). U-183 was fitted with six 53.3 cm (21 in) torpedo tubes (four fitted at the bow and two at the stern), 22 torpedoes, one 10.5 cm (4.13 in) SK C/32 naval gun, 180 rounds, and a 3.7 cm (1.5 in) SK C/30 as well as a 2 cm (0.79 in) C/30 anti-aircraft gun. The boat had a complement of forty-eight.

== Service history ==
After serving in the Atlantic, U-183 sailed from France in July 1943, arriving at Penang on 27 October, and operated in the zone for almost two years. She carried out six war patrols including In March 1944, torpedoing the oil tanker British Loyalty that was anchored in the Addu lagoon in the Maldives. The tanker was damaged but not sunk.

U-183 was sunk on 23 April 1945, 15 days before Germany's surrender, by the American submarine USS Besugo in the Java Sea. Only one crew member survived.

In November 2013 the wreck of either this submarine or U-168 has been located.

=== Wolfpacks ===
U-183 took part in three wolfpacks, namely:

- Luchs (4 – 6 October 1942)
- Panther (7 – 11 October 1942)
- Hartherz (3 – 7 February 1943)

== Summary of raiding history ==
Date	Name	Nationality	Tonnage (GRT)	Fate
3 December 1942	Empire Dabchick	United Kingdom	6,089	Sunk
11 March 1943	Olancho	Honduras	2,493	Sunk
29 February 1944	Palma	United Kingdom	5,419	Sunk
9 March 1944	British Loyalty	United Kingdom	6,993	Total loss
5 June 1944	Helen Moller	United Kingdom	5,259	Sunk

== Bibliography ==
- Busch, Rainer; Röll, Hans-Joachim (1999). German U-boat commanders of World War II : a biographical dictionary. Translated by Brooks, Geoffrey. London, Annapolis, Md: Greenhill Books, Naval Institute Press. ISBN 1-55750-186-6.
- Busch, Rainer; Röll, Hans-Joachim (1999). Deutsche U-Boot-Verluste von September 1939 bis Mai 1945 [German U-boat losses from September 1939 to May 1945]. Der U-Boot-Krieg (in German). Vol. IV. Hamburg, Berlin, Bonn: Mittler. ISBN 3-8132-0514-2.
- Gröner, Erich; Jung, Dieter; Maass, Martin (1991). U-boats and Mine Warfare Vessels. German Warships 1815–1945. Vol. 2. Translated by Thomas, Keith; Magowan, Rachel. London: Conway Maritime Press. ISBN 0-85177-593-4.
