= HMS Taku (N38) =

Submarine of the Royal Navy

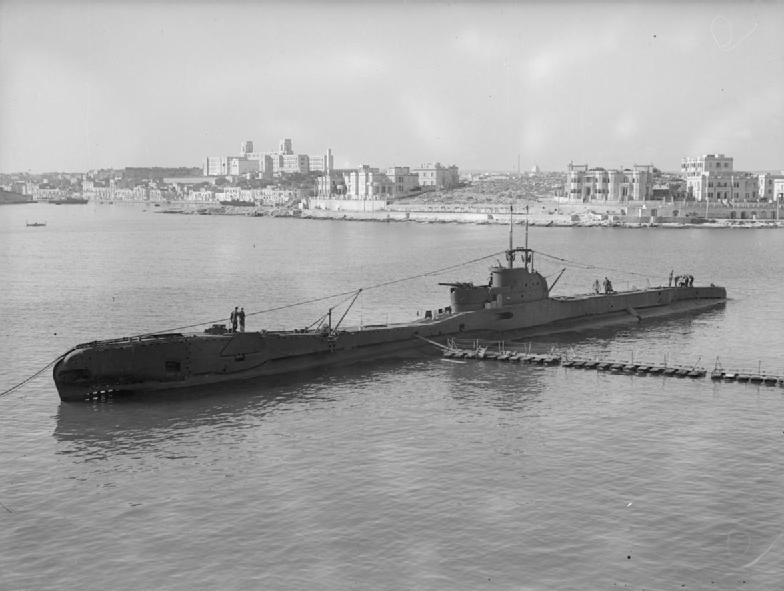
- HMS Taku in Malta harbour in January 1943

History

United Kingdom
- Builder: Cammell Laird, Birkenhead
- Laid down: 18 November 1937
- Launched: 20 May 1939
- Commissioned: 3 January 1940
- Identification: Pennant number N38
- Fate: Sold to be broken up for scrap in November 1946
- Badge

General characteristics
- Class & type: British T class submarine
- Displacement: 1,090 tons surfaced; 1,575 tons submerged
- Length: 275 ft (84 m)
- Beam: 26 ft 6 in (8.08 m)
- Draught: 12 ft 9 in (3.89 m) forward; 14 ft 7 in (4.45 m) aft
- Propulsion: Two shafts; Twin diesel engines 2,500 hp (1.86 MW) each; Twin electric motors 1,450 hp (1.08 MW) each
- Speed: 15.25 knots (28.7 km/h) surfaced; nine knots (20 km/h) submerged
- Range: 4,500 nautical miles at 11 knots (8,330 km at 20 km/h) surfaced
- Test depth: 300 ft (91 m) max
- Complement: 59
- Armament: Six internal forward-facing 21 inch (533 mm) torpedo tubes; Four external forward-facing torpedo tubes; Six reload torpedoes; One QF 4-inch (102 mm) deck gun

HMS Taku was a British T class submarine built by Cammell Laird in Birkenhead. She was laid down on 18 November 1937 and commissioned on 3 October 1940.

== Career ==
Taku served in home waters and the Mediterranean. In April 1940, she mistook HMS Ashanti for a German destroyer and fired several torpedoes at her. All the torpedoes missed. In an attack on a German convoy in May, she damaged the German torpedo boat Möwe, and in November, launched a failed attack on the German tanker Gedania.

Assigned to the Mediterranean in 1941, she scored numerous kills, including the Italian merchantmen Cagliari and Silvio Scaroni, the Italian passenger/cargo ship Caldea, the German munitions transport Tilly L. M. Russ, the Italian auxiliary minesweeper Vincenso P., the Italian tankers Arca and Delfin, and the Greek sailing vessels Niki, Lora and a small vessel which was unidentified. She also attacked, but failed to hit, the German merchant ship Menes and the Italian tanker Cerere.

Reassigned to operate off the Scandinavian coast in 1944, Taku sank the German merchantmen Rheinhausen and Hans Bornhofen, and badly damaged the German freighter Harm Fritzen. In March, she attacked a convoy, but missed her target, the ex-Norwegian Kriegsmarine transport Moshill.

Taku struck a mine in April 1944, and was damaged. After the end of the war, she was sold for scrap in November 1946 and broken up in South Wales.
