= USS Pogy (SS-266) =

Submarine of the United States

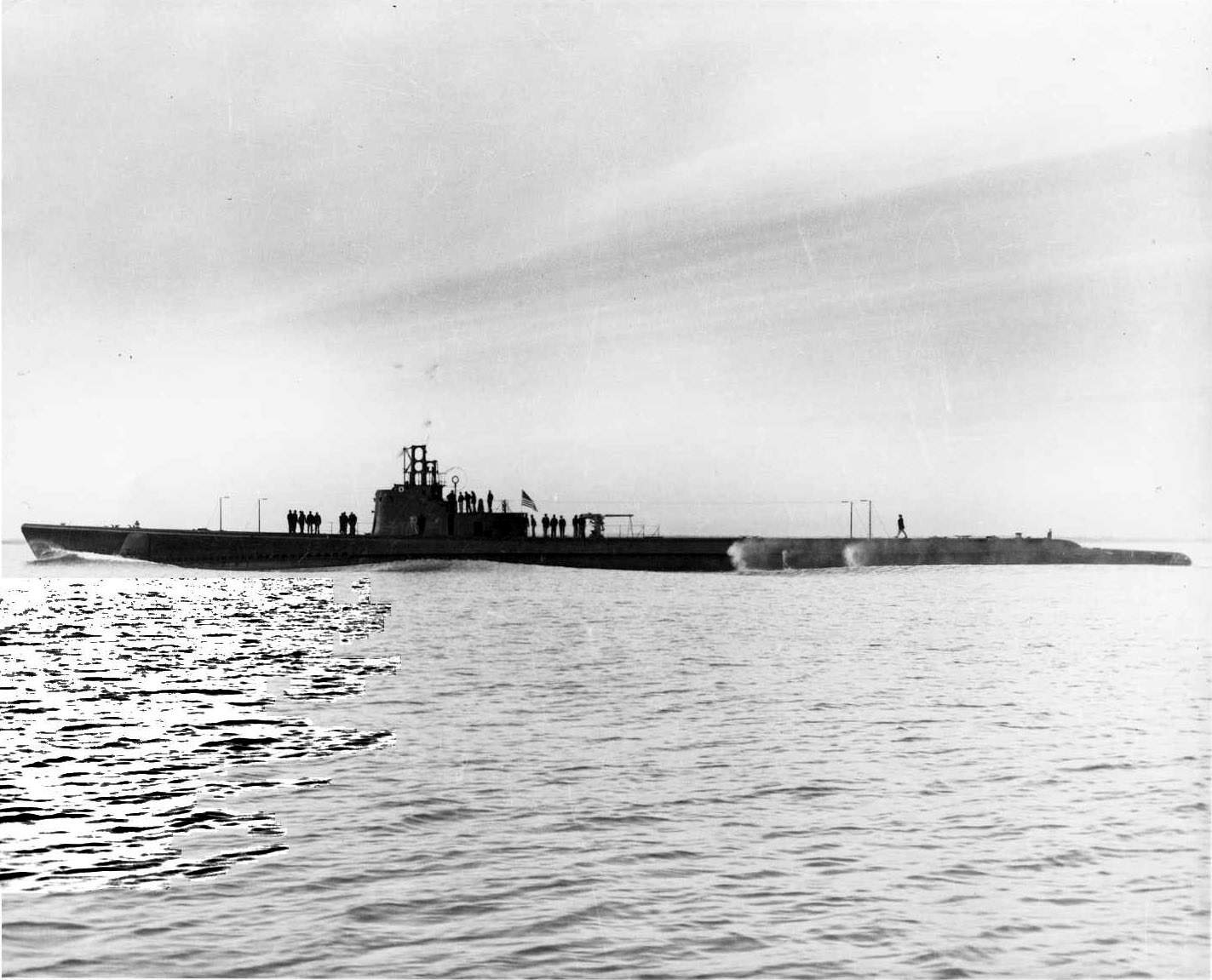
- Pogy (SS-266), underway, possibly on the Great Lakes, c. 1943–1945

History

United States
- Builder: Manitowoc Shipbuilding Company, Manitowoc, Wisconsin
- Laid down: 15 September 1941
- Launched: 23 June 1942
- Commissioned: 10 January 1943
- Decommissioned: 1 February 1943
- Recommissioned: 12 February 1943
- Decommissioned: 20 July 1946
- Stricken: 1 September 1958
- Fate: Sold for scrap, 1 May 1959

General characteristics
- Class & type: Gato-class diesel-electric submarine
- Displacement: 1,525 long tons (1,549 t) surfaced; 2,424 long tons (2,463 t) submerged
- Length: 311 ft 9 in (95.02 m)
- Beam: 27 ft 3 in (8.31 m)
- Draft: 17 ft 0 in (5.18 m) maximum
- Propulsion: 4 × General Motors Model 16-248 V16 Diesel engines driving electric generators; 2 × 126-cell Sargo batteries; 4 × high-speed General Electric electric motors with reduction gears; two propellers; 5,400 shp (4.0 MW) surfaced; 2,740 shp (2.0 MW) submerged
- Speed: 21 knots (39 km/h) surfaced; 9 knots (17 km/h) submerged
- Range: 11,000 nautical miles (20,000 km) surfaced at 10 knots (19 km/h)
- Endurance: 48 hours at 2 knots (4 km/h) submerged; 75 days on patrol
- Test depth: 300 ft (90 m)
- Complement: 6 officers, 54 enlisted
- Armament: 10 × 21-inch (533 mm) torpedo tubes; 6 forward, 4 aft; 24 torpedoes; 1 × 3-inch (76 mm) / 50 caliber deck gun; Bofors 40 mm and Oerlikon 20 mm cannon

USS Pogy (SS-266), a Gato-class submarine, was the first ship of the United States Navy to be named for the pogy, or menhaden. She was credited with sinking 16 ships totaling 62,633 gross register tons during World War II.

== Construction and commissioning ==
Pogy (SS–266) was laid down 15 September 1941 by the Manitowoc Shipbuilding Co., Manitowoc, Wisc., launched 23 June 1942; sponsored by Mrs. Julius A. Furer; and commissioned 10 January 1943. Pogy temporarily decommissioned 1 February for a Mississippi River cruise on a river barge to New Orleans, LA, and recommissioned upon her arrival 12 February.

== Operational history ==
=== World War II ===
==== First war patrol, April – June 1943 ====
After fitting out, trial runs, and training, Pogy arrived Pearl Harbor 5 April 1943. On 15 April she set out for her patrol area along the eastern coast of Honshū, making her first contact 1 May. Her periscope attack on a convoy of five ships with one escort sank ex-gunboat Keishin Maru, and damaged a small cargo ship. Upon surfacing that night, Pogy attacked a destroyer with three torpedoes, but was unable to observe the results. The next day she destroyed a large sampan by gunfire. On 9 May while making a submerged attack on a convoy of four cargo ships, a bomb close astern forced Pogy to retire. On 11 May, she sank a 100-ton sampan by gunfire. Two torpedo hits sank a small cargo ship 26 May, and on 5 June Pogy retired to Midway.

==== Second war patrol, June – August 1943 ====
She departed Midway on her second war patrol 26 June. Throughout July she covered the Empire-Truk main communication and supply line. While patrolling submerged east of the Pulap Islands 5 July, she attacked two cargo ships with torpedoes, damaging the leading 3,000-ton cargo ship by one hit.

Pogy sighted an aircraft ferry steaming for Truk, and sank the 7,497-ton Mongamigawa Maru and her valuable cargo 1 August. The submarine then departed the area, stopping at Johnston Island for fuel on the 14th, and arriving at Pearl Harbor two days later for refit.

==== Third and fourth war patrols, September – December 1943 ====
Pogy departed Pearl Harbor 9 September for her third war patrol, in the Palau area. On 28 September she sighted a five ship convoy. After a two-day chase and one unsuccessful attack, she scored two torpedo hits on the largest cargo ship of the convoy, Maebashi Maru, sinking 7,000 more tons of enemy shipping. On 6 October Pogy fired and missed with 4 torpedoes at Nichiei Maru. On 26 October Pogy returned to Pearl Harbor.

The submarine sailed for her patrol area again in the Palau Islands on 25 November. En route, on 7 December, she sighted a large cargo ship and a submarine tender escorted by a destroyer. In the ensuing attack three torpedoes hit and sank the 6,081-ton submarine tender, (Note: According to one source, the ship sunk was the collier Soyo Maru.) and one hit the cargo ship, before Pogy went deep to sit out an attack of 22 depth charges. She surfaced in the darkness to find the cargo ship dead in the water with the destroyer circling her. Pogy launched two torpedoes, both hits.

On 13 December Pogy sank 3,821-ton transport Fukkai Maru leaving Palau loaded with troops. (Note: According to Cressman, Fukkai Maru was only damaged.) The angry escort dropped 27 depth charges during the counter-attack, the three closest charges causing damage which forced Pogy to return to Midway on 22 December.

==== Fifth war patrol, February – March 1944 ====
On 5 February 1944 Pogy departed Midway on her fifth war patrol for an anti-shipping sweep of the Formosa area. During the morning of 10 February, she spotted a convoy in Bashi Channel, off the southern tip of Formosa, guarded by three Japanese destroyers. Pogy attacked with five torpedoes, sinking the Japanese destroyer Minekaze and 5,500-ton passenger-cargo ship Malta Maru, and damaging another cargo ship.

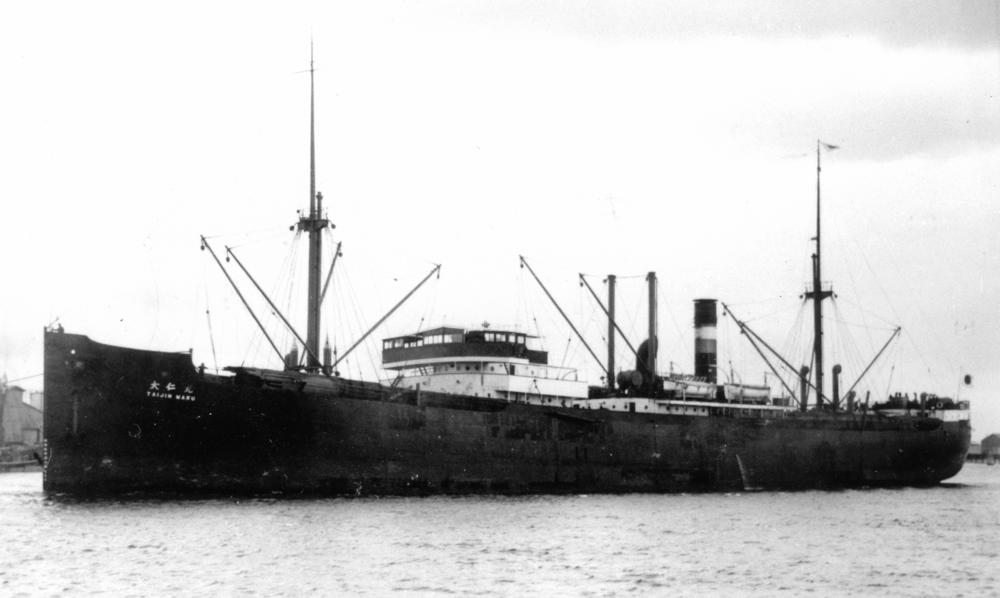
Taizin Maru

Pogy then headed north up the east coast of Taiwan and, on 20 February, caught a convoy on the Tropic of Cancer. She sank the 5,154-ton cargo ship Taizin Maru with two torpedoes and the 3,610-ton cargo ship Nanyo Maru with one. Three days later in Ryukyu waters, Pogy sank another cargo ship, before heading for Pearl Harbor, arriving 8 March 1944.

==== Sixth war patrol, April – June 1944 ====
On 7 April 1944 she departed on her sixth patrol, southeast of Japan. The night of 28–29 April, Pogy sighted and sank the Japanese submarine I-183. She then attacked and sank a cargo ship on 5 May, and a medium cargo ship on 13 May.

Three days later Pogy sank a 20-ton sampan by gunfire, and captured five of her crew. On 20 May, Pogy destroyed a small trawler and arrived back in Pearl Harbor 29 May. She departed Pearl Harbor 1 June for a West Coast navy yard overhaul, arriving at Hunter's Point Naval Shipyard, San Francisco. 8 June. Pogy left for Pearl Harbor 17 September.

==== Seventh and eighth war patrols, October 1944 – February 1945 ====
After a training period, she got underway 13 October for her seventh war patrol, in the Ryukyu (Nansei) islands and waters south of Japan, but made no contacts before returning to Midway 2 December.

On 27 December Pogy sailed on her eighth patrol in the Bonin and Volcano Islands. On 14 January 1945 she made an unsuccessful torpedo attack on a convoy of three cargo ships. No other opportunity to attack presented itself during the patrol, and the ship returned to Midway 11 February.

==== Ninth war patrol, March – May 1945 ====
On 12 March 1945 Pogy got underway for her ninth patrol in the area south of Tokyo Bay. On 19 April 1945, she was on lifeguard duty in the Pacific Ocean southeast of Honshu, Japan, at 32°59′N 139°58′E when a United States Army Air Forces B-24 Liberator mistakenly strafed her and dropped a bomb which detonated as she passed through a depth of 30 feet (9.1 m) while submerging. The strafing inflicted minor but extensive damage on Pogy, but she suffered no casualties and was able to remain on patrol. On 29 April Pogy rescued ten Army aviators from the downed B-29 Superfortress The Queen Bee, and got underway for Saipan to transfer them. On 6 May she departed Saipan for Pearl Harbor arriving 15 May for refit.

==== Tenth war patrol, July – August 1945 ====
On 2 July Pogy departed Pearl Harbor for the Sea of Japan on her tenth and final war patrol. She made a run under the minefields and patrolled in the "Emperor's private ocean" until V-J Day. Hunting was better on this patrol. On 27 July Pogy sank a large cargo ship with two torpedoes, damaged a 10,000-ton tanker on 2 August, and on 5 August destroyed the 2,200-ton cargo ship Kotohirasan Maru. She returned to Midway 21 August with her World War II career completed.

=== Postwar ===
Pogy departed Midway 5 September for Panama and then the East Coast of the United States. She arrived New York 3 October.

== Decommissioning and disposal ==
Pogy was placed out of commission in the US Atlantic Reserve Fleet 20 July 1946 at Naval Submarine Base New London in New London, Connecticut. She was struck from the Navy List 1 September 1958 and sold 1 May 1959.

== Honors and awards ==
Pogy received eight battle stars for service in World War II.
