= List of shipwrecks in January 1944 =

The list of shipwrecks in January 1944 includes ships sunk, foundered, grounded, or otherwise lost during January 1944.

== 1 January ==
List of shipwrecks: 1 January 1944
Ship	State	Description
Hecksee	Germany	World War II: The cargo ship struck a mine and sank off Anholt, Denmark.
Kanaiyama Maru	Japan	World War II: The cargo ship (a.k.a. Kinseison Maru) was damaged by a near miss during an air raid by American Consolidated PBY Catalina aircraft and sank near Lorengau, Manus Island, Admiralty Islands (02°03′S 147°27′E). Survivors were rescued by CH-23 (Imperial Japanese Navy).
Nagoya Maru	Imperial Japanese Navy	World War II: Convoy 4222: The Nagoya Maru-class aircraft transport was torpedoed and damaged in the Pacific Ocean off Aogashima (35°15′N 138°02′E) by USS Herring (United States Navy). 110 passengers and one crewman were killed. The ship was abandoned and survivors were taken off by Ikazuchi (Imperial Japanese Navy). She sank on 2 January.
Okuyo Maru	Imperial Japanese Navy	World War II: The auxiliary gunboat was torpedoed and sunk in Ambon Bay, Java, Netherlands East Indies by USS Ray (United States Navy). 131 passengers and four crewmen were killed.
Ryuyo Maru	Imperial Japanese Army	World War II: The Ryuyo Maru-class auxiliary transport was torpedoed and sunk in the Pacific Ocean (8°24′N 122°56′E) by USS Puffer (United States Navy). One passenger and six crewmen were killed.
Yildum	United Kingdom	The cargo ship (3,731 or 3,234 GRT, 1913) collided with Odysseus (Greece) in the Atlantic Ocean and sank (48°44′N 59°13′W). The entire crew of Yildum was rescued.

== 2 January ==
List of shipwrecks: 2 January 1944
Ship	State	Description
Albert Gallatin	United States	World War II: The Liberty ship was torpedoed and sunk in the Gulf of Oman 60 nautical miles (110 km) off the Arabian coast (21°21′N 059°58′E) by I-26 (Imperial Japanese Navy). All aboard (43 crew members and 28 armed guards) survived and were rescued by Britannia (Norway).
Isshin Maru	Japan	World War II: The Standard Type 1TL tanker was torpedoed and sunk in the East China Sea 23 nautical miles (43 km) north west of Naze, Kagoshima (28°36′N 129°03′E) by USS Finback (United States Navy). Lost with all 58 hands.

== 3 January ==
List of shipwrecks: 3 January 1944
Ship	State	Description
Ryuei Maru	Imperial Japanese Navy	World War II: The Standard Wartime Type 1TM tanker was torpedoed and sunk in the South China Sea north west of Miri, Borneo (06°03′N 110°02′E) by USS Kingfish (United States Navy). 46 crew were killed.
Saishu Maru	Japan	World War II: The cargo ship was torpedoed and sunk in the Pacific Ocean off Hokkaido by USS Tautog (United States Navy). Five crew and one gunner were killed.
USS Turner	United States Navy	The Gleaves-class destroyer suffered a series of onboard explosions, capsized and sank off the Ambrose Light, New York with the loss of 138 of her 256 crew.
Weserland	Germany	World War II: The cargo ship was shelled and sunk in the South Atlantic by USS Somers (United States Navy). 130 survivors were rescued by USS Somers. The last four survivors were rescued by Camocim (Brazilian Navy) on 13 January. There was at least one dead, one Italian sailor.

== 4 January ==
List of shipwrecks: 4 January 1944
Ship	State	Description
Bokuei Maru	Imperial Japanese Navy	World War II: Convoy HI-24: The Standard Wartime Type 1TM tanker was sunk in a collision with Terukuni Maru (Japan) west of Moji (34°04′N 130°32′E). One crewman was killed.
Hakko Maru	Japan	World War II: The tanker was torpedoed and sunk in the South China Sea (7°10′N 108°25′E) by USS Bluefish (United States Navy). Four crewmen were killed.
Heimei Maru	Imperial Japanese Navy	World War II: Convoy T: The transport ship was bombed and damaged at Kupang, Netherlands East Indies (10°10′S 123°30′E) by North American B-25 Mitchell aircraft of the United States Army Air Force and Bristol Beaufighter aircraft of the Royal Australian Air Force. She was scuttled by shore batteries. Two crewmen were killed.
M-36	Soviet Navy	World War II: The M-class submarine sank in the Black Sea during post-repair sea trials off the Georgian coast with the loss of all 22 men aboard. Recent research shows it was not sunk by a mine laid by U-20 as previously thought.
USS PT-145	United States Navy	World War II: The ELCO 80'-class PT boat grounded off Mindiri, Papua New Guinea (05°34′S 146°11′E) and then was scuttled by USS PT-370 (United States Navy) after she rescued the whole crew.
Rio Grande	Germany	World War II: The cargo ship was scuttled by her crew in the South Atlantic after being intercepted and shelled by USS Jouett and USS Omaha (both United States Navy). 72 survivors were rescued by USS Marblehead (United States Navy) on 8 January. The last survivors were rescued by Camocim (Brazilian Navy) on 13 January.
Tamon Maru No. 8	Japan	World War II: The cargo ship was torpedoed and sunk in the South China Sea off the coast of French Indochina by USS Cabrilla (United States Navy). 38 crew were killed.
Usa Maru	Japan	World War II: The cargo ship was torpedoed and sunk in the Pacific Ocean off Hokkaido by USS Tautog (United States Navy). 15 crew and a passenger were killed.

== 5 January ==
List of shipwrecks: 5 January 1944
Ship	State	Description
Burgenland	Germany	World War II: The cargo ship was scuttled by her crew in the South Atlantic after being intercepted and shelled by USS Jouett and USS Omaha (both (United States Navy). 21 survivors were rescued by USS Davis (United States Navy) on 7 January. 35 survivors were rescued by USS Winslow (United States Navy) on 8 January. The last survivors were rescued by Camocim (Brazilian Navy) on 13 January.
Kiyo Maru	Japan	World War II: The tanker was torpedoed and sunk in the South China Sea (06°55′N 108°23′E) by USS Rasher (United States Navy) and was lost with all 42 hands.
Pasman	Kriegsmarine	World War II: The minelayer ran aground while under tow in the Kozja Draga Bight off Ist Island in December and was demolished on 5 January by a boarding party from NB 3 ( Yugoslav Partisans).
Subiaco	Italy	World War II: The cargo ship was sunk at Genoa by Allied aircraft. She was refloated 1945–46 and scrapped.

== 6 January ==
List of shipwrecks: 6 January 1944
Ship	State	Description
F 181	Kriegsmarine	World War II: The Marinefährprahm ran aground at Punta Morelle, Italy. All attempts to recover it the next days failed. There were no casualties.
F 296	Kriegsmarine	World War II: The Marinefährprahm was torpedoed and sunk in the Mediterranean Sea off Rapallo, Liguria, Italy by HMS Untiring (Royal Navy) with the loss of one crew.
Generale Achille Papa	Kriegsmarine	World War II: The escort, a former Generali-class torpedo boat, was bombed and sunk while under repair at Genoa. Later raised.
Helios	Germany	World War II: The training ship was bombed and sunk at Stettin by Royal Air Force aircraft.
Katsuragisan Maru	Imperial Japanese Navy	World War II: Convoy No. 3225: The Kachosan Maru-class auxiliary transport was sunk by a Japanese mine while entering the North East Channel into Truk.
Polperro	United Kingdom	World War II: The coaster (403 GRT, 1937) was one of the four vessels lost when convoy WP 457 was attacked by seven E-boats in the English Channel. She was torpedoed and sunk by S 84 and S 136 (both Kriegsmarine) with the loss of all eight crew and three gunners aboard.
Prince of Wales	United States	The 99-gross register ton, 58.5-foot (17.8 m) motor vessel was destroyed by fire at Point Couverden (58°11′25″N 135°03′10″W) in Southeast Alaska.
Robert Erskine	United States	The Liberty ship was wrecked in a gale at Bizerta, Algeria. She was a total loss. One crewman drowned.
Solstad	Sweden	World War II: The cargo ship was one of the four vessels lost when convoy WP 457 was attacked by seven E-boats in the English Channel. She was torpedoed and sunk in the English Channel by S 143 (Kriegsmarine) with the loss of five crew.
USS St. Augustine	United States Navy	The gunboat was in a collision with Camas Meadows (United States) in the Atlantic Ocean off Cape May, New Jersey and sank with the loss of 115 of her 145 crew.
Triton	Germany	World War II: The survey ship was bombed and sunk at Stettin by Royal Air Force aircraft.
Underwood	United Kingdom	World War II: The cargo ship (1,990 GRT, 1943) was one of the four vessels lost when convoy WP 457 was attacked by seven E-boats in the English Channel. She was torpedoed and sunk in the English Channel by S 141 (Kriegsmarine) with the loss of all 15 crew and 3 gunners.
HMT Wallasea	Royal Navy	World War II: The Isles-class naval trawler (545/770 t, 1943) was one of the four vessels lost when convoy WP 457 was attacked by seven E-boats in the English Channel. She was torpedoed and sunk off Mounts Bay, Cornwall by S 138 (Kriegsmarine). 35 crew were killed or missing.
William S. Rosecrans	United States	World War II: The Liberty ship dragged anchor during storm south of Naples, Italy, and stroke a mine that started a fire. She sank later that afternoon in the Gulf of Salerno (40°10′N 14°15′E) but there were no casualties.

== 7 January ==
List of shipwrecks: 7 January 1944
Ship	State	Description
Bernhard von Tschirschky	Kriegsmarine	World War II: The Krischan-class seaplane tender was bombed and sunk at Kiel by Royal Air Force aircraft.
Fushimi Maru No. 3	Japan	World War II: The tanker was torpedoed and sunk in the South China Sea (9°27′N 117°36′E) by USS Kingfish (United States Navy) with the loss of 39 crew.
Kai Ping	Vichy France	World War II: The cargo ship was bombed and sunk in the South China Sea off the coast of French Indochina by Consolidated B-24 Liberator and North American B-25 Mitchell aircraft of the United States Fourteenth Air Force.
Katsuragisan Maru	Japan	World War II: The cargo ship struck a Japanese mine and sank at Truk with the loss of 5 crew.
Krischan	Kriegsmarine	World War II: The Krischan-class seaplane tender was sunk at Kiel by Royal Air Force aircraft.
Natal	Germany	World War II: The cargo ship struck a mine off Cape Makkaur, Norway and was beached in the Altafjord with the loss of one life. She broke in two the next day. Her wreck was then attacked several times in the next months by Soviet submarines.
HMS Tweed	Royal Navy	World War II: The River-class frigate (1,370/1,830 t, 1943) was torpedoed and sunk in the Atlantic Ocean (48°18′N 21°19′W) by U-305 (Kriegsmarine) with the loss of 83 of her 127 crew.

== 8 January ==
List of shipwrecks: 8 January 1944
Ship	State	Description
Castillo Andrade	Spain	The cargo ship caught fire departing from Vigo. She sank on 10 January. She was refloated in April. Temporary repairs were made and she was taken in to Bilbao for permanent repairs. She returned to service in 1948 as Antarctico
Eleni	Greece	World War II: The sailing vessel was sunk at Lesbos by ORP Dzik (Polish Navy).
F 516	Kriegsmarine	World War II: The MFP-C landing craft grounded on the Italian coast (43°19′N 10°27′W) and was then bombed by Allied fighter-bombers. Given up as a total loss.
U-426	Kriegsmarine	World War II: The Type VIIC submarine was depth charged and sunk in the Bay of Biscay west of Nantes, Loire-Inférieure, France (46°47′N 10°42′W) by a Short Sunderland aircraft of 10 Squadron, Royal Australian Air Force with the loss of all 51 crew.
U-757	Kriegsmarine	World War II: The Type VIIC submarine was depth charged and sunk in the Atlantic Ocean (50°33′N 18°03′W) by HMS Bayntun (Royal Navy) and HMCS Camrose (Royal Canadian Navy) with the loss of all 49 crew.

== 9 January ==
List of shipwrecks: 9 January 1944
Ship	State	Description
F 446	Kriegsmarine	The MFP-C2M minelayer sank in a storm in the Black Sea off Feodosia, Crimea (44°58′N 35°29′W). Only four crew were saved, the usual crew for this type being 17–21 men.
Shinko Maru No. 1 Go	Imperial Japanese Navy	World War II: The Kiri Maru No. 8-class auxiliary transport ship was torpedoed and sunk 11 nautical miles (20 km; 13 mi) south east of Tandjung Puting (03°41′S 111°54′E) by HNLMS O 19 (Royal Netherlands Navy).
U-81	Kriegsmarine	World War II: The Type VIIC submarine was bombed and sunk at Pola, Italy by aircraft of the United States Fifteenth Air Force with the loss of two crew. She was raised on 22 April 1944 and scrapped.
UIT-19	Kriegsmarine	World War II: The Flutto-class submarine was bombed and sunk at Pola by aircraft of the United States Fifteenth Air Force.

== 10 January ==
List of shipwrecks: 10 January 1944
Ship	State	Description
Asuka Maru	Imperial Japanese Army	World War II: Convoy No. 127: The Asuka Maru-class auxiliary aeronautical repair ship (7,488 GRT, 1924) was torpedoed and sunk in the Pacific Ocean by USS Seawolf (United States Navy). Fifteen passengers and 23 crewmen were killed, 105 survivors were rescued by Getsuyo Maru and Kurokaya Maru (both Japan).
DB-2, DB-19, DB-23, DB-26, DB-27, DB-33, DB-40 and DB-47	Soviet Navy	World War II: The No. 1-class landing boats were lost during the Soviet attempt to land troops on Cape Tarkhan, Crimea. DB-19 and DB-23 were sunk by coastal artillery, the other by a storm. Crew losses are unknown (at least one for DB-2, three for DB-19, three for DB-26, two for DB-27 and three for DB-47) but more than 200 troops drowned during the operation.
Daniel Webster	United States	World War II: Convoy KMS 37: The Liberty ship was torpedoed and damaged in the Mediterranean Sea north of Oran, Algeria by aircraft of Kampfgeschwader 26, Luftwaffe. She was beached at Oran but was declared a total loss. There were no casualty.
F 571	Kriegsmarine	World War II: The Marinefährprahm was beached at Ak-Mechet, Soviet Union after being bombed by Soviet aircraft. She was later repaired.
Getsuyo Maru	Japan	World War II: Convoy No. 127: The Imperial Japanese Army-chartered Type 1A Standard cargo ship was torpedoed and sunk while towing Yahiko Maru (Japan) in the Pacific Ocean (27°18′N 127°40′E) by USS Seawolf (United States Navy). 20 crew were killed.
Horai Maru	Japan	World War II: The auxiliary sailing vessel was sunk in the South China Sea by gunfire from USS Thresher (United States Navy).
Marija	Yugoslav Partisans	World War II: The Partizan cargo ship was captured during the night by S 36 and S 55 (both Kriegsmarine) in the Adriatic Sea off Korčula, Yugoslavia and was sunk some hours later by British fighter-bomber aircraft.
No. 048 and No. 0612	Soviet Navy	World War II: The MO-4-class patrol vessel were destroyed by German aircraft during the Soviet attempt to land troops on Cape Tarkhan, Crimea. Three crew of 0612 were killed.
Ocean Hunter	United Kingdom	World War II: Convoy KMS 37: The Ocean ship (7,198 GRT, 1942) was torpedoed and sunk in the Mediterranean Sea north east of Oran (36°07′N 0°11′W) by aircraft of Kampfgeschwader 26, Luftwaffe.
PVO-21	Soviet Navy	The PVO-10-class anti-aircraft motor boat was sunk by a storm during the Soviet attempt to land troops on Cape Tarkhan, Crimea. 13 crew died.
Ryuju Maru No. 1 Go	Imperial Japanese Navy	The auxiliary picket boat sank in the Pacific Ocean at (36°04′N 156°04′E) after suffering a mechanical break down and hull cracks on 8 January. The crew were taken off by the auxiliary gunboat Kamitsu Maru (Imperial Japanese Navy)
S-55	Kriegsmarine	World War II: The Type 1939 Schnellboot sank in the Adriatic Sea west of Korčula, Yugoslavia after an onboard torpedo was detonated by a bomb hit during a British air attack.
Yahiko Maru	Japan	World War II: Convoy No. 127: The cargo ship was torpedoed and damaged in the Pacific Ocean by USS Seawolf (United States Navy). Taken under tow by Getsuyo Maru (Japan), she was torpedoed again by USS Seawolf and sunk at 27°18′N 127°40′E. 141 Army passengers and 15 crewmen were killed.
Yamabiko Maru	Imperial Japanese Navy	World War II: Convoy No. 4102: The Yamabiko Maru-class repair ship was torpedoed and damaged in the Pacific Ocean off the Bungo Strait (31°28′N 131°44′E) by USS Steelhead (United States Navy). The vessel was taken under tow by Yamakuni Maru (Japan) and broke in half after Yamakuni Maru was torpedoed and sunk at the entrance to Yaene Wan, Hachijō-jima on 13 January with the stern section sinking immediately. The bow section sank on 14 January. The captain and three crewmen died in the entire process.
USS YMS-127	United States Navy	The YMS-1-class minesweeper was thrown ashore in heavy weather on the beach of Tanaga Island, Aleutian Islands. Pulled off by USS Ute (United States Navy) on 13 January. She was declared a constructive total loss by the United States Navy, but was sold in 1945, repaired and put in commercial service as the fishing vessel Vindicator.
USS YP-281	United States Navy	The yard patrol boat was disabled in a storm. USS PC-1134 (United States Navy) rescued all 19 crew and sank her by gunfire, west of the Society Islands (16°53′S 177°18′E).

== 11 January ==
List of shipwrecks: 11 January 1944
Ship	State	Description
Erie Maru	Imperial Japanese Army	World War II: Convoy O-105: The Yoshida Maru No. 1-class transport was torpedoed and sunk in the Bungo Strait 20 nautical miles (37 km; 23 mi) east of Saeki, Kyushu (32°31′N 132°34′E) by USS Sturgeon (United States Navy). About 200 of the 2,500 troops aboard were killed.
Este	Germany	World War II: The coaster was bombed and sunk in Livadia Bay.
GA 54 Glaros	Kriegsmarine	World War II: The naval drifter/Vosportenboot was bombed and sunk at Piraeus.
Joseph Smith	United States	The Liberty ship started to break in two in the Atlantic Ocean (44°30′N 43°10′W) and was abandoned. She was scuttled by a Royal Navy ship. The whole crew was rescued.
Kuma	Imperial Japanese Navy	World War II: The Kuma-class light cruiser was torpedoed and sunk in the Indian Ocean off Penang, Malaya (5°26′N 99°52′E) by HMS Tally-Ho (Royal Navy). 138 crew were killed. Survivors were rescued by Uranami (Imperial Japanese Navy). On 23 May 2014 Hai Wei Gong 889 (Cambodia) was detained by Malaysian authorities for illegally salvaging her wreck. The wreck was completely removed.
M 1226	Kriegsmarine	World War II: The RD-class minesweeper was bombed and sunk at Piraeus, Greece with the loss of five lives.
Selma	Germany	The cargo ship was destroyed in an explosion in Oslo, Norway. The same ship had been involved in the December 1943 Filipstad explosion.
SF 268	Kriegsmarine	World War II: The Siebel ferry was set on fire by a bomb in Makarska, Croatia, and burned. There were no casualty.
SG 08	Kriegsmarine	World War II: The guard boat (a.k.a. GA 08), a former SG 1-class motor torpedo boat, was bombed and sunk at Piraeus.
SG 09	Kriegsmarine	World War II: The guard boat (a.k.a. GA 09), a former SG 1-class motor torpedo boat, was bombed and sunk at Piraeus.
Shunten Maru	Japan	Convoy No. 454: The transport ran aground on Taisha Shoal in the East Pratas Reef area of the South China Sea. Refloated on 20 January, repaired and returned to service.
Teifu Maru	Japan	Convoy No. 454:The transport (a.k.a. Taihu Maru) ran aground on Taisha Shoal in the East Pratas Reef area of the South China Sea. Refloated on 14 February, repaired and returned to service.
Timlat	Soviet Union	The cargo ship was sunk by ice off Cape Shipunski with some loss of life. There were fourteen survivors.
Vera Gioia	Germany	World War II: The cargo ship was bombed and sunk in Livadia Bay.

== 12 January ==
List of shipwrecks: 12 January 1944
Ship	State	Description
Aghia Paraskevi	Greece	World War II: The fishing vessel was sunk in the Aegean Sea by ORP Sokół (Polish Navy).
Barge No. 19	Soviet Union	The barge was sunk by a storm in the Caspian Sea in the area of Shakhova Kosa. Her master and four crewmen were killed.
Capitaine Luigi	France	World War II: The cargo ship struck a mine and sank off Marseille, Bouches-du-Rhône.
Choko Maru No. 2 Go	Imperial Japanese Navy	World War II: The Chojo Maru-class auxiliary transport was torpedoed and sunk in the Bismarck Sea 325 miles (523 km) south west of Truk (03°37′N 147°27′E) by USS Albacore (United States Navy). Thirteen crewmen and many of her 300 passengers were killed.
H-4	Imperial Japanese Navy	World War II: The H-2-class motor gun boat, being towed by Choko Maru No. 2 (Imperial Japanese Navy), was so badly damaged when Choko Maru No. 2 was torpedoed and sunk that the vessel was scuttled.
Ikuta Maru	Imperial Japanese Navy	World War II: The Ikuta Maru-class auxiliary gunboat was bombed and sunk at Kwajalein (08°42′N 167°44′E) by Consolidated PB4Y Liberator aircraft of VB-108 and BV-109 Squadrons, US Navy. One gunner was killed.
Kanyo Maru	Japan	World War II: The cargo ship struck a mine and sank at Takao, Formosa.
M 4615 St. Benoit	Kriegsmarine	The naval drifter/minesweeper was lost on this date.
Nigitsu Maru	Imperial Japanese Army	World War II: Convoy FU-901: The Akitsu Maru-class landing craft depot ship was torpedoed and sunk in the Pacific Ocean south east of Okinawa off Okino-Daita Island (23°15′N 132°51′E) by USS Hake (United States Navy). A total of 456 soldiers, 83 gunners and 35 crewmen were killed. Survivors were rescued by Amagiri (Imperial Japanese Navy).
SG 20	Kriegsmarine	World War II: The guard ship capsized at Genoa, Italy during an air raid. She was later raised, but not repaired (see 25 April 1945).
Tymlat	Soviet Union	The cargo ship was wrecked in a storm off Kamchatka. Her master and 34 crewmen were killed. 13 survivors rescued by Kiev (Soviet Union).

== 13 January ==
List of shipwrecks: 13 January 1944
Ship	State	Description
Haguro Maru	Imperial Japanese Navy	World War II: Convoy 2112: The transport ship was bombed and sunk by a United States 5th Air Force Consolidated B-24 Liberator aircraft 35 nautical miles (65 km) northwest of New Hanover Island, Admiralty Islands, (02°43′N 149°25′E) with the loss of ten passengers and eight crewmen.
Inca	United States	The 72-foot (22 m) dragger, or fishing schooner, was run down by a steamer, possibly a United States Army transport, before sun up off Virginia. Lost with all seven hands.
U-231	Kriegsmarine	World War II: The Type VIIC submarine was bombed and sunk in the Atlantic Ocean north east of the Azores, Portugal (44°15′N 20°38′W) by a Vickers Wellington aircraft of 172 Squadron. Royal Air Force with the loss of seven of her 50 crew.
Valaya	Thailand	World War II: The passenger ship was sunk in the Menam River by a mine.

== 14 January ==
List of shipwrecks: 14 January 1944
Ship	State	Description
HMS Adherent	Royal Navy	The Assurance-class rescue tug (700 t, 1942) foundered in the North Atlantic with the loss of all ten crew.
Entrerios	Germany	World War II: The cargo ship was torpedoed and sunk off Farsund, Norway by Bristol Beaufighter aircraft of the Royal Air Force Wick Strike Wing. 13 of the crew and seven of the flak crew were rescued; 26 crew and 16 flak crew were missing.
Gyoei Maru	Imperial Japanese Army	World War II: The transport ship was bombed and sunk in the South China Sea (20°35′N 113°44′E) by Consolidated B-24 Liberator and North American B-25 Mitchell aircraft of the United States Fourteenth Air Force.
Ha-50	Imperial Japanese Navy	World War II: The Type B midget submarine was dragged down and sunk when her tow ship, Yamazuru Maru (Japan), was sunk by USS Seawolf (United States Navy).
Ken'yō Maru	Imperial Japanese Navy	World War II: Convoy KU: The Itsukushima-class fleet oiler was torpedoed and sunk in the Bismarck Sea (05°23′N 141°32′E) by USS Guardfish (United States Navy) with the loss of three of her crew.
Milano	Italy	World War II: The cargo ship was sunk at Šibenik, Croatia by an air attack.
Nippon Maru	Imperial Japanese Navy	World War II: Convoy KU: The Tatekawa-class fleet oiler was torpedoed and sunk in the Bismarck Sea (05°02′N 140°50′E) by USS Scamp (United States Navy). Sixteen crewmen and 27 Special Naval Landing Force troops were lost.
Sainte Maxime	Free France	The cargo ship collided with Wendell Philipps (United States) and sank in the Mediterranean Sea off Cap Bon, Algeria.
Sazanami	Imperial Japanese Navy	World War II: Convoy KU: The Fubuki-class destroyer was torpedoed and sunk in the Pacific Ocean 300 nautical miles (560 km) south east of Yap, Caroline Islands (05°30′N 141°34′E) by USS Albacore (United States Navy) with the loss of 153 of her 212 crew. Survivors were rescued by Akebono (Imperial Japanese Navy).
Tama Maru	Imperial Japanese Navy	World War II: The guard ship was bombed and sunk at Kwajalein by Consolidated B-24 Liberator and North American B-25 Mitchell aircraft of the United States Army Air Force.
Wickenburgh	Netherlands	The ship was wrecked at Lagos, British Nigeria.
Wittekind	Germany	World War II: The cargo ship was bombed and sunk by Royal Air Force Bristol Beaufighter aircraft off Lista, Norway. Eight of the ship's crew with nine of the flak gunners were rescued, all were lightly wounded. 21 crew and nine flak crew were missing.
Yamakuni Maru	Japan	World War II: The cargo liner was torpedoed and sunk off Hachijō-jima by USS Swordfish (United States Navy) while towing Yamabiko Maru (Japan). 18 crewmen were killed.
Yamazuru Maru	Japan	World War II: Convoy O-105: The cargo ship was torpedoed and sunk in the East China Sea 155 nautical miles (287 km) south east of Tanegashima by USS Seawolf (United States Navy). Four passengers, two gunners and 30 crewmen were killed. Ha-50 (Imperial Japanese Navy), which was being towed by Yamazuru Maru, was dragged under and sunk.
USS YO-159	United States Navy	World War II: The non self-propelled YOG-40-class fuel oil barge was torpedoed and damaged 250 nautical miles (460 km) east of Espiritu Santo (15°27′S 171°28′E) by Ro-42 (Imperial Japanese Navy). Eight crewmen were killed. USS PC-1138 (United States Navy) rescued the 14 survivors and scuttled her by shelling as a hazard to navigation sometime during the following night.

== 15 January ==
List of shipwrecks: 15 January 1944
Ship	State	Description
Aghios Giorgios	Greece	World War II: The sailing vessel was sunk in the Aegean Sea (37°38′N 24°54′E) by gunfire of HMS Unruly (Royal Navy).
Agda	Denmark	World War II: The coaster struck a mine and sank in the Great Belt off Endelave with all 14 aboard (four crew and ten passengers).
Ryuko Maru	Imperial Japanese Army	World War II: The Rakuto Maru-class auxiliary transport ship was sunk by torpedo in the Indian Ocean off Car Nicobar (10°50′N 93°05′E) by HMS Tally-Ho (Royal Navy). Eleven passengers (comfort women), a gunner, and nine crewmen were killed.
Tatuno Maru	Japan	World War II: Convoy No. 882: The cargo ship was torpedoed, broke in two and the fore part sank in the Luzon Strait about 75 miles (121 km) north of Luzon by USS Thresher (United States Navy) and the aft section sank the next day (20°05′N 120°13′E). Eight passengers and 12 crewmen were killed.
Toho Maru	Imperial Japanese Army	World War II: Convoy No. 882: The Toei Maru-class auxiliary repair ship (4,092 GRT 1938) was torpedoed and sunk in the Luzon Strait (20°40′N 120°36′E) about 75 miles (121 km) north of Luzon by USS Thresher (United States Navy). Twelve gunners and 35 crewmen were killed.

== 16 January ==
List of shipwrecks: 16 January 1944
Ship	State	Description
Delhi Maru	Imperial Japanese Navy	World War II: The Delhi Maru-class auxiliary gunboat was torpedoed, her bow broke off and sank in Pacific Ocean (34°12′N 139°54′E), by USS Swordfish (United States Navy). Five crewmen and 135 troops were killed. Her stern was taken into tow but capsized and sank in rough seas the next day. Her commanding officer and 34 crewmen were rescued by CH-50 (Imperial Japanese Navy).
Denmark Maru	Imperial Japanese Army	World War II: Convoy O-105: The Daifuku Maru No. 1-class auxiliary transport was torpedoed and sunk in the Philippine Sea (23°15′N 135°35′E) by USS Whale (United States Navy). A total of 1,653 troops, 20 gunners and 31 crewmen were killed.
Dobaroctar	Yugoslav Partisans	World War II: The motor boat was heavily damaged by German assault boats near Cape Pelegrin (Hvar Island) and later sank in Zaglav Bay.
USS Flier	United States Navy	The Gato-class submarine ran aground on a reef at Midway Atoll. She was refloated on 22 January. Later repaired and returned to service.
Haruna Maru	Imperial Japanese Navy	World War II: Convoy No. 2517: The Manko Maru-class auxiliary storeship (1,460 GRT 1923) was sunk about 86 nautical miles (159 km; 99 mi) south west of Palau (06°00′N 133°25′E) in a collision with Kyoei Maru (Imperial Japanese Navy). Two crew were killed. 54 survivors were rescued by CHa-54 (Imperial Japanese Navy).
Hozukawa Maru	Imperial Japanese Army	World War II: Convoy O 905: The Type D Peacetime Standard cargo ship was bombed or torpedoed and sunk in the Pacific Ocean north west of New Hanover off Queen Charlotte Island (02°20′S 146°42′E) by Consolidated PBY Catalina aircraft of the United States Navy. Three crewmen were killed.
I-181	Imperial Japanese Navy	World War II: The Kaidai-class submarine was engaged in a running battle with USS PCS-1422 and USS PCS-1459 (both United States Navy) in the Vitiaz Strait. She ended up grounded and wrecked on Gneisenau Point, Kelanoa Harbour, New Guinea.
Kaika Maru	Imperial Japanese Navy	World War II: Convoy 2112: The Seiga Maru-class auxiliary transport ship (a.k.a. Kaiga Maru) was torpedoed and sunk in the Pacific Ocean south east of Truk (3°50′N 148°44′E) by USS Blackfish (United States Navy) with the loss of 27 passengers and one crewman.
HMS LCT 1029	Royal Navy	World War II: The Mk 4 landing craft tank (350/586 t, 1943) was sunk by a mine off Skegness, Lincolnshire.
USS Macaw	United States Navy	The Chanticleer-class submarine rescue ship ran aground on a reef at Midway Island. On 12 February 1944 she slipped off the reef and sank with the loss of her commanding officer and four crew members.
Meisho Maru	Imperial Japanese Navy	World War II: Convoy O 905: The Kibi Maru-class auxiliary transport ship was bombed or torpedoed and sunk in the Pacific Ocean 45 miles north west of New Hanover off Queen Charlotte Island (02°20′S 146°42′E) by Consolidated PBY Catalina aircraft of the United States Navy. Twelve crew were killed.
Nikko Maru	Japan	World War II: The coaster was torpedoed and sunk in the Pacific Ocean (12°48′N 150°18′E) by USS Seahorse (United States Navy). Eight crewmen were killed.
Perseus	United Kingdom	World War II: The cargo ship (10,286 GRT, 1923) was torpedoed and sunk in the Bay of Bengal (12°00′N 80°14′E) by I-165 (Imperial Japanese Navy). Her 115 crew were rescued by a Royal Indian Navy corvette without loss.
Syunko Maru	Imperial Japanese Army	World War II: Convoy O 905: The Shunko Maru-class auxiliary transport (4,027 GRT, 1936) (a.k.a. Syunko Maru) was bombed or torpedoed and sunk in the Pacific Ocean north west of New Hanover off Queen Charlotte Island (02°30′S 146°49′E) by Consolidated PBY Catalina aircraft of the United States Navy. 30 passengers and 20 crew were killed.
Sretan-II	Yugoslav Partisans	World War II: The motor boat was heavily damaged by German assault boats near Cape Pelegrin (Hvar Island) and later sank in Zaglav Bay.
Sumner I. Kimball	United States	World War II: Convoy ON 210: The Liberty ship straggled behind the convoy. She was torpedoed and sunk in the Atlantic Ocean (52°35′N 35°00′W) by U-960 (Kriegsmarine with the loss of all 69 crew.
U-544	Kriegsmarine	World War II: The Type IXC/40 submarine was sunk in the Atlantic Ocean by Grumman TBM Avenger aircraft based on USS Guadalcanal (United States Navy) with the loss of all 57 crew.
Vaijan Kutur'e	Soviet Union	World War II: The tanker was torpedoed and sunk in the Black Sea (42°21′N 41°31′E) by U-20 (Kriegsmarine) with the loss of four of her 64 crew. Survivors were rescued by Soviet Navy minesweepers and patrol boats. The wreck was raised on 6 October 1945, repaired and returned to service in 1954.

== 17 January ==
List of shipwrecks: 17 January 1944
Ship	State	Description
Arborea	Germany	World War II: The transport ship was bombed and sunk at Šibenik, Yugoslavia during a British air raid.
Chiburi Maru	Japan	World War II: The cargo ship was bombed and sunk in the Pacific Ocean east of Manus, Admiralty Islands by Consolidated B-24 Liberator aircraft of the United States Fifth Air Force.
Fukei Maru	Japan	World War II: The cargo ship was bombed and sunk in the Pacific Ocean by Consolidated B-24 Liberator aircraft of the United States Fifth Air Force.
Ha-51	Imperial Japanese Navy	World War II: The midget submarine was lost while under tow when Tarushima Maru (Imperial Japanese Navy) was torpedoed and sunk by USS Whale (United States Navy).
Hakkai Maru	Imperial Japanese Navy	World War II: The Myoko Maru-class repair ship (a.k.a. Hachikai Maru) (5,110 GRT 1937) was torpedoed and sunk Simpson Harbor, Rabaul, New Guinea (04°13′S 152°15′E) by United States Navy Grumman TBF Avenger and Douglas SBD Dauntless aircraft. 23 gunners and 2 crewmen were lost. She had been refloated by November 1945 and taken in to Surabaya, Indonesia.
Kaiun Maru	Imperial Japanese Navy	The auxiliary guard boat was lost on this date.
Kenshin Maru	Japan	World War II: The transport ship was torpedoed and sunk at Rabaul, New Guinea by United States Navy Grumman TBF Avenger and Douglas SBD Dauntless aircraft. 22 crewmen were lost.
Kosei Maru	Imperial Japanese Army	World War II: Convoy O 905: The transport ship was torpedoed and sunk at Rabaul by United States Navy Grumman TBF Avenger and Douglas SBD Dauntless aircraft. Fourteen landing barges were lost as cargo, two crewmen were lost.
L-23	Soviet Navy	World War II: The Leninets-class submarine was sunk in the Black Sea north west of Cape Torchakut, Crimea by UJ 106 (Kriegsmarine).
Milano	Germany	World War II: The transport ship was bombed and sunk at Šibenik during a British air raid.
Shinko Maru 6	Imperial Japanese Navy	World War II: The guard boat was sunk by Royal Australian Air Force Bristol Beaufighter aircraft at Tanimbar Island, Netherlands East Indies.
NB 12 Skorpion	Kriegsmarine	The boat was rammed and sunk in Vestre Byfjord, Bergen, Norway by Oldenburg (Germany).
Tarushima Maru	Imperial Japanese Navy	World War II: Convoy O-105: The Tarushima Maru-class transport ship was shelled and damaged in the evening of 16 January in the Philippine Sea (22°34′N 135°46′E) by USS Whale (United States Navy). She was torpedoed and sunk the next day (22°00′N 135°10′E) by the same submarine. A total of 613 troops and 20 crew were killed. Ha-51 (Imperial Japanese Navy), being towed, was dragged down with the ship. On 1 February a landing barge was discovered drifting about 60 nautical miles (110 km; 69 mi) east of Okinawa. From it Miyake (Imperial Japanese Navy) took off 54 survivors and Yukikaze (Imperial Japanese Navy) took off 57.

== 18 January ==
List of shipwrecks: 18 January 1944
Ship	State	Description
Nanyu Maru No. 1	Japan	World War II: The tanker was bombed and sunk at Jaluit Atoll by United States Army Air Force Douglas A-24 Banshee and Curtiss P-40 Warhawk aircraft.
Shoyu Maru	Japan	World War II: The tanker was torpedoed and sunk in the South China Sea west of Palawan (0°18′N 118°37′E) by USS Bowfin (United States Navy). 37 crewmen were killed.
Yoshida Maru	Imperial Japanese Navy	World War II: The Hirota Maru-class auxiliary transport was torpedoed and sunk 140 nautical miles (260 km) west south west of Marcus Island (23°46′N 151°30′E) by USS Flasher (United States Navy). A total of 76 passengers, fifteen gunners and eight crewmen were killed.

== 19 January ==
List of shipwrecks: 19 January 1944
Ship	State	Description
Kaishu Maru	Japan	World War II: The cargo ship was bombed and sunk in the Pacific Ocean east of Manus, Admiralty Islands by Consolidated B-24 Liberator aircraft of the United States Fifth Air Force.
HMS LCA 783, HMS LCA 790 and HMS LCA 865	Royal Navy	The landing craft assaults (8.5/11.5 t, 1943) were lost on this date.
USS LCT-582	United States Navy	The landing craft tank was lost as deck cargo when USS LST-228 (United States Navy) was wrecked off Bahia Angra Island, Azores, Portugal (38°39′N 27°12′W).
USS LST-228	United States Navy	The landing ship tank ran aground and was wrecked off Bahia Angra Island, Azores (38°39′N 27°12′W).
U-641	Kriegsmarine	World War II: The Type VIIC submarine was depth charged and sunk in the Atlantic Ocean (50°25′N 18°49′W) by HMS Violet (Royal Navy) with the loss of all 50 crew.
Unknown landing craft	Kriegsmarine	World War II: The landing craft was sunk by an anti-tank mine on the beach at Hvar Island. 21 troops killed.

== 20 January ==
List of shipwrecks: 20 January 1944
Ship	State	Description
Emsland	Germany	World War II: The cargo ship was struck by an air-dropped torpedo and was beached at Stad, Norway. The beached ship was torpedoed by HMS Satyr (Royal Navy) on 5 February and destroyed by aircraft on 11 February 1944.
Fort Buckingham	United Kingdom	World War II: The Fort ship (7,122 GRT, 1943) was torpedoed and sunk in the Indian Ocean (8°19′N 66°40′E) by U-188 (Kriegsmarine) with the loss of 38 of the 89 people on board. Survivors were rescued by Kongsdal, Ora (both Norway) and Moorsby (United Kingdom). Most spent two weeks on boats and rafts and four died of exposure before or just after rescue.
Hidaka Maru	Imperial Japanese Navy	World War II: Convoy FU-905: The Standard Type 1K ore carrier was torpedoed and sunk 140 nautical miles (260 km) southeast of Cape Muroto, south of Shiono Misaki (31°32′N 135°58′E) by USS Batfish (United States Navy). Fourteen passengers and two crewmen were lost.
Jinzu Maru	Japan	World War II: The dredger was bombed and sunk in the Pacific Ocean north of New Guinea by Consolidated B-24 Liberator aircraft of the United States Fifth Air Force.
Koyu Maru	Japan	World War II: The cargo ship was torpedoed and sunk in the Pacific Ocean off Palau 6°04′N 134°17′E) by USS Gar (United States Navy). Four gunners and 35 crewmen were killed.
Kuzan Maru	Japan	World War II: The cargo ship was bombed and sunk in the South China Sea off the coast of Formosa by Consolidated B-24 Liberator aircraft of the United States Fourteenth Air Force.
Menado Maru	Japan	World War II: The cargo ship was bombed and sunk in the South China Sea 155 miles (249 km) south of the coast of Formosa by three Consolidated B-24 Liberator aircraft of the United States Fourteenth Air Force. Shokei Maru (Imperial Japanese Navy) rescued survivors. 30 passengers and 29 crewmen were killed.
Münsterland	Germany	World War II: The blockade breaker was shelled and sunk in the English Channel off Cap Blanc-Nez by British shore based artillery. Of the 76 men aboard, there were 11 dead, 5 missing and 60 survivors.
No. 34	Soviet Navy	The No. 11-class landing tender was lost on this date.
Skagerak I	Kriegsmarine	World War II: The minelayer (1,281 GRT, 1939) was torpedoed and sunk west of Svåholmen, Norway (58°19′48″N 6°01′06″E) by aircraft of 489 Squadron, Royal New Zealand Air Force with the loss of seven crew.
U-263	Kriegsmarine	World War II The Type VIIC submarine struck a mine and sank in the Bay of Biscay off La Rochelle, Charente-Maritime, France (46°06′N 1°30′W during a diving exercise. All 51 crew were lost.
V 712 Chemnitz	Kriegsmarine	World War II: The Vorpostenboot struck a mine and sank in the English Channel off Cherbourg, Seine-Inférieure, France.

== 21 January ==
List of shipwrecks: 21 January 1944
Ship	State	Description
G 107 Elettra	Kriegsmarine	The armed yacht was lost on this date.
Ikoma Maru	Imperial Japanese Army	World War II: Convoy Wewak No. 8: The Maya Maru-class auxiliary transport was torpedoed and sunk in the Pacific Ocean 282 nautical miles (522 km) south east of Palau (03°25′N 137°06′E) by USS Seahorse (United States Navy). A total of 413 Indian Army prisoners of war and 43 crewmen were killed.
Kosin Maru	Japan	World War II: The cargo ship was torpedoed and sunk in the South China Sea (7°22′N 115°05′E) by USS Tinosa (United States Navy).
SF 267	Kriegsmarine	World War II: The Siebel ferry was set on fire by fighter-bomber aircraft and sank in the port of Vrboska with the loss of one crew.
V 1307 Stettin	Kriegsmarine	The naval whaler was lost on this date.
Yasukuni Maru	Japan	World War II: Convoy Wewak No. 8: The cargo ship was torpedoed and sunk in the Pacific Ocean 282 nautical miles (522 km) south east of Palau (03°25′N 137°06′E) by USS Seahorse (United States Navy). 62 troops and 6 crewmen killed.

== 22 January ==
List of shipwrecks: 22 January 1944
Ship	State	Description
CHa-40	Imperial Japanese Navy	World War II: The auxiliary submarine chaser was bombed and sunk off Lorengau Harbor, Manus, New Guinea (01°50′S 147°20′E) by North American B-25 Mitchell and Lockheed P-38 Lightning aircraft of the United States Army Air Force.
F 598	Kriegsmarine	World War II: The MFP-C2 landing craft was attacked off Civitavecchia by enemy ships and exploded. Nine crew were killed.
Heiwa Maru	Japan	World War II: The cargo ship was bombed and sunk at Manus by North American B-25 Mitchell aircraft of the United States Army Air Force.
Koshin Maru	Imperial Japanese Navy	World War II: Convoy 3202: The Koshin Maru-class emergency oiler was torpedoed and sunk in the Flores Sea (07°27′N 115°07′E) by USS Tinosa (United States Navy). 22 crewmen were killed.
USS LCI(L)-20	United States Navy	World War II: The landing craft infantry (large) was bombed and sunk off Anzio, Italy. Two crewmen were killed.
HMS LCP(R) 616	Royal Navy	The landing craft personnel (mortar) (6/8 t, 1942) was lost on this date.
No. 31	Soviet Navy	The No. 11-class landing tender was lost on this date.
R-75	Kriegsmarine	The Type R-41 minesweeper was sunk in a collision with U-350 (Kriegsmarine) in the Bay of Danzig.
USS Portent	United States Navy	World War II: Operation Shingle: The Auk-class minesweeper struck a mine and sank in the Mediterranean Sea off Nettuno, Lazio, Italy (41°24′N 12°44′E).
Ro-37	Imperial Japanese Navy	World War II: The Ro-35-class submarine was sunk in the Pacific Ocean off the Santa Cruz Islands (11°47′S 164°17′E) by USS Buchanan (United States Navy).
Seinan Maru	Japan	World War II: Convoy 3202: The Type 1K Standard Merchant ore carrier (possibly converted to an oiler) was torpedoed and sunk in the Flores Sea (07°19′N 116°52′E) by USS Tinosa (United States Navy). Sixteen gunners and 29 crewmen were killed.
Tatsu Maru	Imperial Japanese Navy	World War II: The auxiliary minelayer was bombed and sunk at Manus by North American B-25 Mitchell aircraft of the United States Army Air Force.

== 23 January ==
List of shipwrecks: 23 January 1944
Ship	State	Description
Hosho Maru No. 2 Go	Imperial Japanese Navy	The auxiliary guard boat was lost on this date.
HMS Janus	Royal Navy	World War II: The J-class destroyer (1,690/2,330 t, 1939) was sunk in the Mediterranean Sea off Anzio, Lazio Italy by a Fritz X glide bomb.
Magane Maru	Imperial Japanese Navy	World War II: The auxiliary gunboat was torpedoed and sunk in the Pacific Ocean 175 nautical miles (324 km) north north west of Chichi Jima (29°49′N 140°08′E) by USS Snook (United States Navy).
No. 45	Soviet Navy	The No. 11-class landing tender was lost on this date.
Panama Maru	Imperial Japanese Army	World War II: Convoy No. 130: The Tacoma Maru-class transport was bombed and sunk with her bow aground on rocks off the coast of China (27°15′N 120°45′E) by Consolidated B-24 Liberator and North American B-25 Mitchell aircraft of the United States Fourteenth Air Force. Twelve troops, two gunners and one crewman were killed. Survivors rescued by Tsuga and Shinko Maru No. 1 Go (both Imperial Japanese Navy).
Seikai Maru	Japan	World War II: The cargo ship was bombed and sunk at Mergui, Malaya by Consolidated B-24 Liberator aircraft of the United States Tenth Air Force.
Taian Maru	Japan	World War II: The cargo ship was torpedoed and sunk in the Pacific Ocean off Palau by USS Gar (United States Navy).
Wiides	Finland	The cargo ship ran aground on the Roter Sand sandbank, in the North Sea off Wesermünde, was broken in two by the storm and sank. Of the 33 people aboard (21 men, four women, a pilot and seven German sailors), only 6 were saved.

== 24 January ==
List of shipwrecks: 24 January 1944
Ship	State	Description
Chosen Maru	Imperial Japanese Army	World War II: The Annan Maru-class auxiliary transport ship was torpedoed and sunk in the Pacific Ocean off the east coast of Kyushu, eastern approaches to the Bungo Strait, off Fukujima lighthouse, Japan (32°40′N 132°18′E) by USS Sturgeon (United States Navy). One gunner and five crew were killed.
F 523	Kriegsmarine	World War II: The MFP-C2 landing craft was beached near Rosignano Marittimo after a battle against MGB 655 and MGB 658 (both Royal Navy), and PT 217 (United States Navy). It was later refloated and restored to service.
FAC Mühlenberg	United States	World War II: The Liberty ship was bombed and sunk at Naples, Italy by German aircraft.
Koan Maru	Imperial Japanese Navy	World War II: The Koan Maru-class auxiliary water tanker (3,462 GRT 1936) was torpedoed and sunk in Simpson Harbour, Rabaul, New Britain, by Grumman TBF Avenger aircraft of the United States Marine Corps. 47 crew and 13 passengers killed.
USS LCT-185	United States Navy	The LCT Mk 5-class landing craft tank foundered in a storm and sank off Bizerta, Tunisia.
Liu Hsing	(Taiwan) China	World War II: The cargo ship was bombed and sunk at Fuzhou by Consolidated B-24 Liberator and North American B-25 Mitchell aircraft of the United States Fourteenth Air Force.
Lyons Maru	Imperial Japanese Navy	World War II: The Lima Maru-class auxiliary passenger-cargo ship was torpedoed and sunk in shallow water in Simpson Harbour, Rabaul (4°13′S 152°12′E) by Grumman TBF Avenger aircraft of the United States Marine Corps. She settled upright with her bridge, funnels, and masts above the water. Anchors and cables were salvaged on 2 January 1946. At a later date the upper hull was demolished as a hazard to navigation.
Myojin Maru No. 2	Imperial Japanese Navy	World War II: Convoy No. 130: The guard boat was bombed and sunk off Icog Island, China by North American B-25 Mitchell aircraft of the United States Fourteenth Air Force.
Myoken Maru	Imperial Japanese Navy	World War II: The auxiliary gunboat was sunk in the Molucca Sea north of Kema, Celebes Islands (01°26′N 125°08′E) by USS Swordfish (United States Navy).
Ryusei	Imperial Japanese Navy	World War II: The lighthouse tender was bombed and sunk off Icog Island, China by North American B-25 Mitchell aircraft of the United States Fourteenth Air Force.
St David	United Kingdom	World War II: The hospital ship (2,702 GRT, 1932) was bombed and sunk in the Mediterranean Sea off Anzio, Lazio, Italy.
Samuel Dexter	United States	The Liberty ship started to break up in the Atlantic Ocean (56°19′N 11°43′W) and was abandoned by her crew. She came ashore at Barra, Outer Hebrides, United Kingdom and broke in two, a total loss.
Taisho Maru	Imperial Japanese Army	World War II: The cargo ship was torpedoed and sunk at Karavia Bay, Rabaul by Grumman TBF Avenger aircraft of the United States Marine Corps. The wreck was scrapped in 1958. Four crew were killed.
V 1307 Stettin	Kriegsmarine	The Vorpostenboot struck the wreck of Heise (Germany) and sank in the North Sea off IJmuiden, North Holland, Netherlands.
Yamayuri Maru	Imperial Japanese Army	World War II: The cargo ship was torpedoed and sunk at Rabaul (4°13′S 152°11′E) by Grumman TBF Avenger aircraft of the United States Marine Corps. Three crewmen were killed.

== 25 January ==
List of shipwrecks: 25 January 1944
Ship	State	Description
Ashahi Maru No. 3 Go	Imperial Japanese Navy	The auxiliary guard boat was lost on this date.
Costante	Kriegsmarine	World War II: The armed tug, that had run aground previously, was captured by Yugoslav Partizans and scuttled by shelling her engine room by patrol boats PC-1 Jadran and PC-3 Skampo (both Yugoslav Partisans).
Fort La Maune	United Kingdom	World War II: The Fort ship (7,130 GRT, 1942) was torpedoed and sunk in the Indian Ocean (13°04′N 56°30′E) by U-188 (Kriegsmarine).
Kasashima	Imperial Japanese Navy	World War II: Convoy No. 130: The Hasashima-class salvage tug was bombed and sunk in the Formosa Strait by North American B-25 Mitchell aircraft of the United States Fourteenth Air Force.
HMS LCP(S) 60	Royal Navy	The landing craft personnel (small) (3/5.5 t, 1943) was lost on this date.
Mil	Kriegsmarine	World War II: The tanker (244 GRT, 1923) struck a mine and sank in Varangerfjord, Norway with the loss of six Norwegian crew. Another source says there were 8 dead and two survivors, possibly including also German casualties.
Nanshin Maru	Japan	The cargo ship ran aground and was wrecked on a shoal off the Miyagiken Peninsula (35°31′N 133°09′E).
Penelope Barker	United States	World War II: Convoy JW 56A: The Liberty ship was torpedoed and sunk in the Barents Sea (73°22′N 22°30′E) by U-278 (Kriegsmarine) with the loss of sixteen of her 72 crew. Survivors were rescued by HMS Savage (Royal Navy).
Suzukaze	Imperial Japanese Navy	World War II: The Shiratsuyu-class destroyer was torpedoed and sunk in the Pacific Ocean 127 nautical miles (235 km) northwest of Ponape (08°51′N 157°10′E), South Pacific Mandate, by the submarine USS Skipjack (United States Navy) with the loss of 285 of her 307 crew including her commanding officer. The submarine chaser CH-33 (Imperial Japanese Navy) rescued 22 survivors.
Walter Camp	United States	World War II: The Liberty ship was torpedoed and sunk in the Indian Ocean (10°00′N 71°49′E) by U-532 (Kriegsmarine). Whole crew rescued by HMS Danae (Royal Navy).
USS YMS-30	United States Navy	World War II: The YMS-1-class minesweeper struck a mine and sank in the Tyrrhenian Sea.

== 26 January ==
List of shipwrecks: 26 January 1944
Ship	State	Description
Andrew G. Curtin	United States	World War II: Convoy JW 56A: The Liberty ship was torpedoed and sunk in the Barents Sea (73°22′N 24°15′E) by U-716 (Kriegsmarine) with the loss of three of her 71 crew. Survivors were rescued by HMS Inconstant (Royal Navy).
Busho Maru	Imperial Japanese Navy	World War II: The Fukken Maru-class auxiliary transport was torpedoed and sunk in the South China Sea east of Saigon, French Indochina (8°30′N 109°10′E) by USS Crevalle (United States Navy) with the loss of two crewmen.
Fort Bellingham	United Kingdom	World War II: Convoy JW 56A: The Fort ship (7,153 GRT, 1943) straggled behind the convoy. She was torpedoed and damaged in the Barents Sea (73°45′N 24°48′E) by U-360 (Kriegsmarine) with the loss of 36 of her 73 crew. Survivors were rescued by HMS Offa (Royal Navy). Two crew members were taken on board U-360 as prisoners of war. Fort Bellingham was later torpedoed and sunk (73°25′N 25°10′E) by U-957 (Kriegsmarine).
Hilary A. Herbert	United States	World War II: The Liberty ship was damaged off Nettuno, Italy by a crashing German fighter aircraft and later by a near miss by a bomb. She was beached to prevent sinking. Later refloated, repaired and returned to service.
John Banyard	United States	World War II: The Liberty ship struck a mine and was damaged in the Tyrrhenian Sea. She was consequently declared a total loss.
USS LCI-32	United States Navy	World War II: The LCI-1-class landing craft infantry was mined and sank off Anzio, Italy while going to the assistance of HMS LST-422. 30 crew were lost.
HMS LST-411	Royal Navy	World War II: The Mk2-class landing ship tank (1,625/4,080 t, 1943) was sunk by a mine off Bastia Sardinia.
HMS LST-422	Royal Navy	World War II: The Mk2-class landing ship tank (1,625/4,080 t, 1943) was sunk by a mine off Anzio with 454 American and 29 British personnel lost
Lüderitzbucht	Germany	World War II: The target ship was torpedoed and damaged off Pillau and was towed in to that port. Subsequently seized as a prize of war, repaired and entered British service as Empire Ock.
Okitsu Maru	Imperial Japanese Navy	World War II: The Okitsu Maru-class auxiliary transport ship was torpedoed and sunk in the Pacific Ocean 146 nautical miles (270 km) north of Ponape (09°24′N 157°45′E) by USS Skipjack (United States Navy). A total of 169 Navy passengers and seven crewmen were lost.
USS PT-110	United States Navy	The ELCO 80 foot-class PT boat was sunk by the detonation of a depth charge following a collision with USS PT-114 (United States Navy) in Abling Harbor, New Britain Island (06°17′S 150°09′E).
USS PTc-38	United States Navy	World War II: The coastal motor torpedo boat was being carried as deck cargo on Andrew G. Curtin (United States). She floated free when that ship was torpedoed and sunk by U-715 (Kriegsmarine) and was later shelled and sunk by U-957 (Kriegsmarine).
USS PTc-39	United States Navy	World War II: The motor torpedo boat was being carried as deck cargo on Andrew G. Curtin (United States) and was lost when that ship was torpedoed and sunk by U-715 (Kriegsmarine).
Samouri	United Kingdom	World War II: The Liberty ship (7,219 GRT, 1943) was torpedoed and sunk in the Gulf of Aden east north east of Socotra, South Yemen (13°13′N 55°56′E) by U-188 (Kriegsmarine). All 49 crew were rescued by Shahzada (United Kingdom).
Surada	United Kingdom	World War II: The passenger ship (5,427 GRT, 1920) was torpedoed and sunk in the Gulf of Aden 40 nautical miles (74 km) east north east of Socotra (13°00′N 55°15′E) by U-188 (Kriegsmarine). All 109 people on board were rescued by Darro (United Kingdom).

== 27 January ==
List of shipwrecks: 27 January 1944
Ship	State	Description
Empire Manor	United Kingdom	World War II: Convoy HX 276: The cargo ship (7,017 GRT, 1943) collided in the Atlantic Ocean with Edward Kavanagh (United States) and was holed. She was taken in tow but a fire developed the next day when seawater reacted with part of her cargo. She broke in two on 29 January with the bow section sinking. The stern section was scuttled by HMCS Kenogami (Royal Canadian Navy) at 43°53′N 53°04′W. Her cargo of gold bullion was salvaged in 1973.
Kasagi Maru	Imperial Japanese Navy	World War II: Convoy 3125B: The Maya Maru-class auxiliary gunboat was torpedoed and sunk 130 miles (210 km) south of Tokyo Bay (33°31′N 139°36′E) by USS Swordfish (United States Navy). Six crew and 468 passengers were killed.
Keikai Maru	Imperial Japanese Navy	World War II: The auxiliary cruiser was torpedoed and sunk in the Pacific Ocean by USS Dace (United States Navy).
Kikuzuki Maru	Imperial Japanese Navy	World War II: Convoy No. 356: The cargo ship was torpedoed and sunk in the Luzon Strait by USS Thresher (United States Navy). Many passengers and ten crewmen were killed.
Kosei Maru	Imperial Japanese Navy	World War II: Convoy No. 356: The Kosei Maru-class auxiliary transport (2,170 GRT 1924) was torpedoed and sunk in the Luzon Strait 54 nautical miles (100 km; 62 mi) south west of Takao (22°10′N 119°30′E) by USS Thresher (United States Navy). Ten crewmen were killed and nine passengers were killed.
Minoo Maru	Imperial Japanese Navy	World War II: Convoy MOMA-07: The Minoo Maru-class naval trawler/auxiliary storeship (422 GRT, 1933) (a.k.a. Minowo Maru) was torpedoed and sunk in the Banda Sea five nautical miles (9.3 km; 5.8 mi) north east of Kur Island, Kai Archipelago, Netherlands East Indies (05°25′S 132°08′E) by USS Bowfin (United States Navy). 22 crewmen were killed.

== 28 January ==
List of shipwrecks: 28 January 1944
Ship	State	Description
Avenir	Greece	The sailing vessel (46 GRT, 1908) was thrown ashore by a storm in near Kissamos, Creta and became a total loss. There were no casualties.
Ha-49	Imperial Japanese Navy	World War II: The midget submarine was lost while under tow when Neikai Maru was bombed and sunk by Consolidated B-24 Liberator and United States Navy Consolidated PBY Catalina aircraft of the United States Army Thirteenth Air Force.
Heinrich Schulte	Germany	World War II: The cargo ship was torpedoed and sunk off Tromsø, Norway (70°08′N 18°14′E) by S-56 (Soviet Navy). There were 2 killed and 54 survivors.
Johann Schulte	Germany	World War II: The cargo ship struck a mine and sank in the Weser.
Kotobuki Maru No. 3	Imperial Japanese Navy	World War II: The Kotobuki Maru No. 3-class auxiliary netlayer was bombed and sunk 97 nautical miles (180 km; 112 mi) south of Eniwetok by one United States Seventh Air Force Consolidated B-24 Liberator bomber aircraft. One crewman killed
M 4021	Kriegsmarine	World War II: The minesweeper struck a mine and sank in the Bay of Biscay off the Île de Croix, Finistère, France.
Neikai Maru	Japan	World War II: Convoy No. SO-93: The cargo ship was bombed and sunk 59 nautical miles (110 km) west northwest of Cape Lambert, New Britain and 75 nautical miles (139 km; 86 mi) south of Queen Charlotte Island (03°45′S 150°38′E) by Consolidated B-24 Liberator aircraft of the United States Thirteenth Air Force and Consolidated PBY Catalina aircraft of the United States Navy.
R-201	Kriegsmarine	World War II: The Type R-151 minesweeper was sunk in the Mediterranean Sea north of the Tiber Estuary by Allied aircraft.
Seerose	Germany	World War II: The transport ship was bombed and sunk at Mykonos, Greece by British aircraft.
Sperrbrecher 137 Botilla Russ	Kriegsmarine	World War II: The Sperrbrecher struck a mine and sank in the Bay of Biscay off Saint-Nazaire, Morbihan, France.
U-271	Kriegsmarine	World War II: The Type VIIC submarine was depth charged and sunk in the Atlantic Ocean west of County Limerick, Ireland (53°15′N 15°52′W) by a Consolidated B-24 Liberator aircraft of the United States Navy with the loss of all 51 crew.
U-571	Kriegsmarine	World War II: The Type VIIC submarine was depth charged and sunk in the Atlantic Ocean west of Ireland (52°41′N 14°27′W) by the Short Sunderland aircraft EK477 coded UT-D of 461 Squadron, Royal Australian Air Force with the loss of all 52 crew.

== 29 January ==
List of shipwrecks: 29 January 1944
Ship	State	Description
Aikaterini T	Greece	World War II: The cargo ship departed from Louisbourg, Nova Scotia for Saint John, New Brunswick, Canada. No further trace, presumed lost by enemy action with the loss of all hands.
Kaldnes	Kriegsmarine	World War II: The supply ship was torpedoed and sunk by aircraft off Feistein Lighthouse, Norway.
HMS LCA 845	Royal Navy	The landing craft assault (8.5/11.5 t, 1943) was lost on this date.
Olga E. Embiricos	United Kingdom	World War II: The cargo ship (4,677 GRT, 1922) was torpedoed and sunk in the Gulf of Aden 210 nautical miles (390 km) west of Socotra, South Yemen (12°30′N 50°10′E) by U-188 (Kriegsmarine) with the loss of 18 crewmen and 2 gunners. The 21 survivors were rescued by Dramatist (United Kingdom).
HMS Oracle	Royal Navy	The armed yacht (745 GRT, 1929) burned at Liverpool.
Samuel Huntington	United States	World War II: The Liberty ship was bombed and sunk at Anzio, Lazio, Italy by Luftwaffe aircraft. Three crewmen were killed. Survivors were rescued by USS LCT-277 (United States Navy).
Shuko Maru	Imperial Japanese Navy	World War II: The net tender was torpedoed and sunk in the Philippine Sea north of the Marianas Islands by USS Angler (United States Navy).
Shuntei Maru	Japan	World War II: The cargo ship was torpedoed and sunk in the Pacific Ocean north of Okinawa by USS Tambor (United States Navy).
HMS Spartan	Royal Navy	World War II: Operation Shingle: The Dido-class cruiser (6,018/7,420 t, 1943) was sunk in the Mediterranean Sea off Anzio by a Henschel Hs 293 glide bomb with the loss of 46 of her 530 crew. Survivors were rescued by USS LCT-198 (United States Navy), HMS Dido and HMS Delhi (both Royal Navy).
U-364	Kriegsmarine	World War II: The Type VIIC submarine was depth charged and sunk in the Bay of Biscay (45°33′N 5°55′W) by a Handley Page Halifax aircraft of 502 Squadron, Royal Air Force with the loss of all 49 crew.

== 30 January ==
List of shipwrecks: 30 January 1944
Ship	State	Description
Akibasan Maru	Imperial Japanese Navy	World War II: Operation Flintlock: The Akagisan Maru-class auxiliary transport was bombed by Douglas SBD Dauntless dive bomber aircraft from US Navy TG 58.2, or shelled by USS Burns (United States Navy), and sank in Kwajalein Atoll (08°52′N 153°56′E). Fifty-three crewmen were killed.
Ashitaka Maru No. 5 Go	Imperial Japanese Navy	The auxiliary guard boat was lost on this date.
Cha-14	Imperial Japanese Navy	World War II: Operation Flintlock: The Cha-1-class auxiliary submarine chasers was sunk at Mili, Marshall Islands by aircraft from US Navy TG 58.2.
Cha-18	Imperial Japanese Navy	World War II: Operation Flintlock: The Cha-1-class auxiliary submarine chasers was sunk at Kwajalein by aircraft from US Navy TG 58.2.
Cha-19	Imperial Japanese Navy	World War II: Operation Flintlock: The Cha-1-class auxiliary submarine chasers was sunk at Mili, Marshall Islands by aircraft from US Navy TG 58.2.
Cha-21	Imperial Japanese Navy	World War II: Operation Flintlock: The Cha-1-class auxiliary submarine chasers was sunk at Kwajalein by aircraft from US Navy TG 58.2.
Cha-28	Imperial Japanese Navy	World War II: Operation Flintlock: The Cha-1-class auxiliary submarine chasers was sunk at Mili, Marshall Islands by aircraft from US Navy TG 58.2.
Eiko Maru No. 2 GO	Imperial Japanese Navy	World War II: Operation Flintlock: The Genkai Maru-class auxiliary transport was shelled and damaged by battleships and destroyers of the United States Navy. She was later shelled and sunk by USS North Carolina (United States Navy) at Roi-Numur (09°10′N 167°20′E), settling in shallow water with her masts above water. All 46 crewmen were killed; either in the sinking, or in the next days during the Battle of Kwajalein.
Fukuyoshi Maru No. 5 Go	Imperial Japanese Navy	The auxiliary guard boat was lost on this date.
Fumi Maru No. 3 Go	Imperial Japanese Navy	The auxiliary submarine chaser was lost on this date.
Gyoraitei No. 5 and Gyoraitei No. 6	Imperial Japanese Navy	World War II: The Gyoraitei No. 1-class motor torpedo boats were bombed and sunk at Wake Island by US Navy Consolidated PB2Y Coronado aircraft.
Hanau	Germany	World War II: The cargo ship struck a mine and sank in the Baltic Sea off Kiel (54°31′N 10°28′E).
HMS Hardy	Royal Navy	World War II: Convoy JW 56A: The V-class destroyer (1,808/2,530 t, 1943) was torpedoed and damaged in the Arctic Ocean (73°40′N 24°30′E) by U-278 (Kriegsmarine) with the loss of 35 crew. Survivors were rescued by HMS Venus (Royal Navy), which scuttled her.
Inari Maru No. 2 Go	Imperial Japanese Navy	The auxiliary guard boat was lost on this date.
Iwata Maru	Imperial Japanese Navy	World War II: The water depot ship was bombed and sunk at Rabaul by Grumman TBF Avenger and Douglas SBD Dauntless aircraft of the United States Navy.
M-451	Kriegsmarine	The minesweeper was wrecked north of Porkkala, Finland.
New Guinea Maru	Imperial Japanese Navy	The auxiliary guard boat was lost on this date.
Seisho Maru	Imperial Japanese Navy	World War II: The auxiliary guard boat was sunk by a Consolidated B-24 Liberator aircraft off Celebes.
Shonan Maru No. 6 Go	Imperial Japanese Navy	The auxiliary submarine chaser was lost on this date.
Taihei Maru No. 1 Go	Imperial Japanese Navy	The auxiliary guard boat was lost on this date.
Taisei Maru	Imperial Japanese Navy	The auxiliary guard boat was lost on this date.
Takasu Maru	Imperial Japanese Navy	The auxiliary guard boat was lost on this date.
Tama Maru No. 3 Go	Imperial Japanese Navy	The auxiliary minesweeper was lost on this date.
Tama Maru No. 5 Go	Imperial Japanese Navy	The auxiliary minesweeper was lost on this date.
Tamashima Maru	Imperial Japanese Navy	World War II: Convoy 3125A: The Koto Maru No. 2 Go-class auxiliary transport ship was torpedoed and sunk in the Pacific Ocean 300 nautical miles (560 km) east Urracas, Mariana Islands (21°12′N 149°28′E) by USS Spearfish (United States Navy). Four crewmen were killed but all 910 passengers aboard were rescued.
Toko Maru	Imperial Japanese Army	World War II: Convoy SO-805: The Chowa Maru-class auxiliary transport ship (2,747 GRT 1940) was torpedoed and sunk in the Pacific Ocean east of Palau by USS Seahorse (United States Navy) (06°20′N 138°08′E). A total of 457 troops, seven gunners and fifteen crewmen were killed.
U-314	Kriegsmarine	World War II: The Type VIIC submarine was depth charged and sunk in the Norwegian Sea (73°41′N 24°30′E) by HMS Meteor and HMS Whitehall (both Royal Navy) with the loss of all 49 crew.
Urara Maru	Imperial Japanese Navy	World War II:The Tokushima Maru-class auxiliary minelayer was bombed and sunk at Mili Atoll, Marshall Islands.

== 31 January ==
List of shipwrecks: 31 January 1944
Ship	State	Description
CHa-25 and CHa-33	Imperial Japanese Navy	World War II: The CHa-1-class auxiliary submarine chasers were sunk at Nauru by American aircraft. CHa-25 was raised and broken up 1946.
Higashinihon Maru	Imperial Japanese Navy	The auxiliary guard boat was lost on this date.
Hiro Maru	Imperial Japanese Navy	World War II: The Hiro Maru-class transport was torpedoed and sunk in the Pacific Ocean 16 nautical miles (30 km; 18 mi) north west of Garapan, Saipan (15°21′N 145°31′E) by USS Tullibee (United States Navy). One crewman and 55 passengers were killed.
Jean Suzon	Kriegsmarine	World War II: The ship was torpedoed and sunk in the Mediterranean Sea (43°24′N 06°54′E) by HMS Untiring (Royal Navy).
Katsura Maru	Imperial Japanese Navy	World War II: The Shinto Maru No. 2-class auxiliary netlayer (541 GRT 1939) was bombed/shelled and sunk by aircraft from Task Group 58.3 and USS Harrison (United States Navy) 108 nautical miles (200 km; 124 mi) west of Eniwetok.
Lita	Norway	The coaster (348 GRT, 1890) came ashore at Langholmen near Stoksund, Norway, and was wrecked.
Paran Maru	Imperial Japanese Navy	World War II: Operation Flintlock: The auxiliary transport (a.k.a. Palawan Maru) was shelled and sunk by USS Harrison (United States Navy) near northern tip of Bigej Island, Kwajalein Atoll.
HMT Pine	Royal Navy	World War II: The Tree-class naval trawler (530/755 t, 1940) was torpedoed and sunk in the English Channel south of Beachy Head, Sussex by a Kriegsmarine Schnellboot with the loss of ten of her twelve crew.
Ruhrort	Germany	World War II: The cargo ship struck a mine and was beached near Nakskov, Denmark. She was later refloated but was sunk at Naksov on 5 August by Danish saboteurs.
St Antoine	Kriegsmarine	World War II: The ship was torpedoed and sunk in the Mediterranean Sea (43°24′N 06°54′E) by HMS Untiring (Royal Navy).
U-592	Kriegsmarine	World War II: The Type VIIC submarine was depth charged and sunk in the Atlantic Ocean southwest of Ireland (50°20′N 17°29′W) by HMS Magpie, HMS Starling and HMS Wild Goose (all Royal Navy) with the loss of all 49 crew.
Yasukuni Maru	Imperial Japanese Navy	World War II: The auxiliary submarine tender, a former Terukuni Maru-class ocean liner, was torpedoed and sunk in the Pacific Ocean 17 nautical miles (31 km; 20 mi) northwest of Truk (09°15′N 147°13′E) by USS Trigger (United States Navy). A total of 888 naval technical personnel and 300 sailors were killed. 43 survivors were rescued by Shiratsuyu (Imperial Japanese Navy).

== Unknown date ==
List of shipwrecks: Unknown date 1944
Ship	State	Description
Alonso	United Kingdom	The 108.8-foot (33.2 m), 172.15-ton fishing trawler vanished after last being seen 5 miles (8.0 km) east northeast of Buoy No. 62F, Hornsea, on 13 January. Lost with all 13 hands.
CHa-14	Imperial Japanese Navy	World War II: The CHa-1-class auxiliary submarine chaser was sunk in the Marshall Islands by American aircraft on the 24 or 30 January.
HMS LCA 697	Royal Navy	The landing craft assault was lost sometime in January.
HMS LCI(L)124	Royal Navy	The landing craft infantry (large) sank in the Mediterranean Sea sometime in January.
HMS LCM 910	Royal Navy	The landing craft mechanized was lost sometime in January.
HMS LCM 930	Royal Navy	The landing craft mechanized was lost sometime in January.
HMS LCM 1022	Royal Navy	The landing craft mechanized was lost sometime in January.
HMS LCM 1064	Royal Navy	The landing craft mechanized was lost sometime in January.
HMS LCM 1173	Royal Navy	The landing craft mechanized was lost sometime in January.
HMS LCM 1204	Royal Navy	The landing craft mechanized was lost sometime in January.
HMS LCP(L) 66	Royal Navy	The landing craft personnel (large) was lost sometime in January.
HMS LCP(L) 356	Royal Navy	The landing craft personnel (large) was lost sometime in January.
HMS LCP(L) 373	Royal Navy	The landing craft personnel (large) was lost sometime in January.
Mira	Italy	The cargo ship was sunk in an Allied air raid on Civitavecchia. She was refloated in 1947 and scrapped in 1948.
Ocean Viking	United Kingdom	World War II: The Ocean ship (7,174 GRT, 1941) was scuttled as a breakwater at Bari, Apulia, Italy. She was raised by the Italians in 1947, repaired and returned to service as Alceo.
Ogashima Maru	Imperial Japanese Navy	World War II: The Ogashima Maru-class auxiliary transport was bombed and sunk 80 nautical miles (150 km) south west of Yap, Caroline Islands (08°07′N 137°38′E) by United States Army Air Force North American B-25 Mitchell aircraft on 20 January with 30 crewmen lost, or damaged by United States Navy Consolidated PB4Y aircraft south of Kwajalein on 24 January and scuttled at 08°14′N 168°02′E by auxiliary submarine chaser Tama Maru No. 5 (Imperial Japanese Navy.
Ro-39	Imperial Japanese Navy	World War II: The submarine was lost off the Marshall Islands in late January.
Ro-40	Imperial Japanese Navy	World War II: The submarine was lost off the Marshall Islands in late January.
USS Scorpion	United States Navy	World War II: The Gato-class submarine was sunk in the Yellow Sea after 5 January, probably by striking a mine, with the loss of all 60 crew.
Taiyo Maru	Imperial Japanese Navy	World War II: Battle of Kwajalein: The Tenyo Maru-class naval trawler/auxiliary storeship was strafed by United States Navy aircraft near Eller Island, Kwajalein Atoll and subsequently beached on Eller Island between 28 January and 1 February. On 5 February engaged troops of the 17th US Infantry Regiment on the island. The next day the ship is machine gunned by USS LCI-438 (United States Navy), with nine crew killed on board. The rest of crew were killed by US troops on the island.
U-305	Kriegsmarine	World War II: The Type VIIC submarine was long thought to have been depth charged and sunk in the North Atlantic Ocean at 49°39′N 20°10′W by the frigate HMS Glenarm and destroyer HMS Wanderer (both Royal Navy) with the loss of all 51 crew. However, recent research suggests that U-377 (Kriegsmarine) was the victim of this attack, and U-305 is now considered to have been lost on an unknown date to unknown causes, perhaps due to a malfunction of one of her own torpedoes.
U-377	Kriegsmarine	World War II: The Type VIIC submarine was lost in the North Atlantic Ocean with all hands. Her cause and date of loss were long considered unknown, with it hypothesized that she may have been a victim of a malfunction of one of her own torpedoes. Recent research suggests, however, that she most likely was depth charged and sunk at 49°39′N 20°10′W by the frigate HMS Glenarm and destroyer HMS Wanderer (both Royal Navy) on 17 January.
Unknown ships	Imperial Japanese Navy	World War II: Battle of Kwajalein: Two tugboats or picket boats were strafed by United States Navy aircraft near Eller Island, Kwajalein Atoll and were subsequently beached on Eller Island between 28 January and 1 February. On 2 February one of them was shelled by USS YMS-90 and USS YMS-383 (both United States Navy). On 5 February the beached ships fired machine guns at troops of the United States 17th Infantry Regiment on the island. The crews were killed by US troops on the island.
