= Convoy JW 56A =

Convoy JW 56A was an Arctic convoy sent from Great Britain by the Western Allies to aid the Soviet Union during World War II. It sailed in January 1944, reaching the Soviet northern ports at the end of the month. Twelve ships arrived safely. During the voyage JW 56A was attacked by a German U-boat force; three ships were sunk and one of the escorts damaged in the operation.

== Ships ==
The convoy consisted of 20 merchant ships which departed from Loch Ewe on 12 January 1944. Close escort was provided by a force led by HMS Inconstant and two corvettes, with two more destroyers joining later. There was also an Ocean escort, comprising the destroyer HMS Hardy (Capt. W. G. A. Robson commanding) and five other destroyers. The convoy was also accompanied initially by a local escort group from Britain, and was also joined later by a local escort group from Murmansk. A cruiser cover force comprising HMS Kent (R.Adm A. F. E. Palliser), HMS Berwick and HMS Bermuda also followed the convoy, to guard against attack by surface units. Convoy JW 56A was opposed by a U-boat force of 10 boats in a patrol line, code-named Isengrim, in the Norwegian Sea.

== Action ==
Convoy JW 56A departed Loch Ewe on 12 January 1944, accompanied by its local escort, of two minesweepers and two corvettes, and a close escort of three destroyers and two corvettes. Three days out from Loch Ewe, on 15 January, Convoy JW 56A ran into a storm, forcing the convoy to shelter at Akureyri in Iceland, which it reached on 18 January. After another three days the storm abated and on 21 January Convoy JW 56A was able to depart, though five ships were forced to drop out with storm damage. The convoy was joined on 21 January by Hardy and her group, but the following day the local escort departed, leaving an escort force of ten warships to see the convoy through.

Despite search patrols by German aircraft the convoy was not found in the prevailing gloom of the polar night, but on 25 January Convoy JW 56A passed the northernmost U-boat of the patrol line, U-739, which broadcast an alert and commenced shadowinLater on 25 January the attack started, continuing throughout the day and following night. The seven boats in contact made a total of seventeen attacks over a twelve-hour period. The first success was a hit by U-360 on the destroyer Obdurate, which was forced to retire with damage. Later U-278 hit Penelope Barker, which sank. Just after midnight U-360 hit Fort Bellingham, which was crippled, and U-716 hit Andrew G Curtin, which sank. Later, at around 5am, U-957 under the command of Gerhard Schaar also hit Fort Bellingham, which was sunk. All other attacks were beaten off, and during 26 January the convoy was able to shake off further pursuit.

On 27 January Convoy JW 56A was met by the local escort, three Soviet destroyers from Murmansk and the ocean escort detached, to head back through the Isengrim patrol area to re-inforce the following convoy JW 56B. Convoy JW 56A arrived at Kola without further losses on 28 January 1944.

== Conclusion ==
Despite the loss of three ships, and the return of five others, twelve ships had arrived safely, making Convoy JW 56A a qualified success. The convoy was followed into Murmansk five days later by Convoy JW 56B.

== Allied order of battle ==
=== Convoyed ships ===
Ships in convoy
Name	Year	Flag	GRT	Notes
Loch Ewe to Akureyri, 12−18 January
Aert Van Der Neer	1942	Netherlands	7,170	
Andrew G Curtin	1943	United States	7,200	
Charles Scribner	1943	United States	7,176	
Edwin L Drake	1943	United States	7,176	
Empire Ploughman	1943	Merchant Navy	7,049	
Fort Bellingham	1942	Merchant Navy	7,153	
Fort Slave	1942	Merchant Navy	7,134	
Noreg	1931	Norway	7,605	
Penelope Barker	1942	United States	7,177	Convoy Commodore Ivan Whitehorn
Richard H Alvey	1942	United States	7,191	
San Adolfo	1935	Merchant Navy	7,365	Escort oiler
San Cirilo	1937	Merchant Navy	8,012	
Thorstein Veblen	1943	United States	7,176	
William Tyler Page	1943	United States	7,176	
Woodbridge N Ferris	1943	United States	7,200	
Akureyri to Murmansk, 21–28 January
Aert Van Der Neer	1942	Netherlands	7,170	Via Akureyri 18–21 January
Andrew G Curtin	1943	United States	7,200	Sunk by U-716 0 surv
Charles Scribner	1943	United States	7,176	
Edwin L Drake	1943	United States	7,176	
Empire Ploughman	1943	Merchant Navy	7,049	
Fort Bellingham	1942	Merchant Navy	7,153	Convoy Commodore Whitehorn, damaged, U-360, sunk U-957
Fort Slave	1942	Merchant Navy	7,134	
Noreg	1931	Norway	7,605	
Penelope Barker	1942	United States	7,177	Sunk by U-278
Richard H Alvey	1942	United States	7,191	
San Adolfo	1935	Merchant Navy	7,365	Escort oiler
San Cirilo	1937	Merchant Navy	8,012	
Thorstein Veblen	1943	United States	7,176	
William Tyler Page	1943	United States	7,176	
Woodbridge N Ferris	1943	United States	7,200	

=== Ships left at Akureyri ===
Ships under repair
Name	Year	Flag	GRT	Notes
Charles Bulfinch	1943	United States	7,176	
Jefferson Davis	1942	United States	7,176	
John A Quitman	1943	United States	7,176	
Joseph N Nicollet	1943	United States	7,176	
Nathaniel Alexander	1942	United States	7,177	

=== Escort forces ===
Escort forces (in relays)
Name	Flag	Type	Notes
Loch Ewe to Iceland
HMS Cygnet	Royal Navy	Black Swan-class sloop	12–18 January
HMS Borage	Royal Navy	Flower-class corvette	Departed for Loch Ewe, 18 January
HMS Dianella	Royal Navy	Flower-class corvette	12–27 January
HMS Poppy	Royal Navy	Flower-class corvette	12–27 January
HMS Wallflower	Royal Navy	Flower-class corvette	Departed for Loch Ewe, 18 January
HMS Orestes	Royal Navy	Algerine-class minesweeper	12–22 January
HMS Ready	Royal Navy	Algerine-class minesweeper	12–22 January
Met Loch Ewe escort force en route, joined oceanic escort
HMS Inconstant	Royal Navy	I-class destroyer	12–27 January
HMS Savage	Royal Navy	S-class destroyer	16–27 January
HNoMS Stord	Royal Norwegian Navy	S-class destroyer	16–27 January
Oceanic escort
HMS Hardy	Royal Navy	V-class destroyer	21–27 January
HMS Obdurate	Royal Navy	O-class destroyer	21–25 January
HMS Offa	Royal Navy	O-class destroyer	21–27 January
HMS Venus	Royal Navy	V-class destroyer	21–27 January
HMS Vigilant	Royal Navy	V-class destroyer	21–27 January
HMS Virago	Royal Navy	V-class destroyer	21–27 January
HMS Dianella	Royal Navy	Flower-class corvette	12–27 January
HMS Poppy	Royal Navy	Flower-class corvette	12–27 January
Cruiser cover
HMS Bermuda	Royal Navy	Fiji-class cruiser	23–26 January
HMS Berwick	Royal Navy	County-class cruiser	Turned back, mechanical defects, re-joined later
HMS Kent	Royal Navy	County-class cruiser	23–26 January
Eastern local escort
Gremyashchy	Soviet Navy	Gnevny-class destroyer	27–28 January
Grozny	Soviet Navy	Gnevny-class destroyer	27–28 January
Razumny	Soviet Navy	Gnevny-class destroyer	27–28 January
Razyaryonny	Soviet Navy	Gnevny-class destroyer	27–28 January
HMS Gleaner	Royal Navy	Halcyon-class minesweeper	26–28 January
HMS Speedwell	Royal Navy	Halcyon-class minesweeper	26–28 January
T-111	Soviet Navy	Admirable-class minesweeper	26–28 January
T-114	Soviet Navy	Admirable-class minesweeper	26–28 January
T-117	Soviet Navy	Admirable-class minesweeper	26–28 January

== Bibliography ==
- Jordan, Roger W. (2006) [1999]. The World's Merchant Fleets 1939: The Particulars and Wartime Fates of 6,000 Ships (2nd ed.). London: Chatham/Lionel Leventhal. ISBN 978-1-86176-293-1.
- Kindell, Don (2026). "JW Convoy Series: Convoy JW 56A". Arnold Hague Convoy Database.
- Mitchell, W. H.; Sawyer, L. A. (1990). The Empire Ships (2nd ed.). London, New York, Hamburg, Hong Kong: Lloyd's of London Press Ltd. ISBN 1-85044-275-4.
- Rohwer, Jürgen; Hümmelchen, Gerhard (2005) [1972]. Chronology of the War at Sea, 1939–1945: The Naval History of World War Two (3rd rev. ed.). London: Chatham. ISBN 1-86176-257-7.
- Ruegg, Bob; Hague, Arnold (1993) [1992]. Convoys to Russia: Allied Convoys and Naval Surface Operations in Arctic Waters 1941–1945 (2nd rev. enl. ed.). Kendal: World Ship Society. ISBN 0-905617-66-5.
- Woodman, Richard (1994). Arctic Convoys 1941–1945 (hbk. ed.). London: John Murray. ISBN 0-7195-5079-3.
