= SS Andrew G. Curtin =

Liberty ship of WWII

History

United States
- Name: Joseph P. Bradley, before 14 October 1942; Andrew G. Curtin, renamed 14 October 1942
- Namesake: Joseph P. Bradley; Andrew G. Curtin
- Owner: War Shipping Administration (WSA)
- Operator: Calmar Steamship Corp.
- Ordered: as type (EC2-S-C1) hull, MCE hull 934
- Awarded: 30 January 1942
- Builder: Bethlehem-Fairfield Shipyard, Baltimore, Maryland
- Cost: $1,075,088
- Yard number: 2084
- Way number: 15
- Laid down: 9 December 1942
- Launched: 18 January 1943
- Sponsored by: Mrs. Warren R. Roberts
- Completed: 31 January 1943
- Identification: Call sign: KKGC
- Fate: Torpedoed and sunk in Barents Sea, 26 January 1944

General characteristics
- Class & type: Liberty ship; type EC2-S-C1, standard
- Tonnage: 10,865 LT DWT; 7,176 GRT
- Displacement: 3,380 long tons (3,434 t) (light); 14,245 long tons (14,474 t) (max)
- Length: 441 feet 6 inches (135 m) oa; 416 feet (127 m) pp; 427 feet (130 m) lwl
- Beam: 57 feet (17 m)
- Draft: 27 ft 9.25 in (8.4646 m)
- Installed power: 2 × Oil fired 450 °F (232 °C) boilers, operating at 220 psi (1,500 kPa); 2,500 hp (1,900 kW)
- Propulsion: 1 × triple-expansion steam engine, (manufactured by Ellicott Machine Corp., Baltimore, Maryland); 1 × screw propeller
- Speed: 11.5 knots (21.3 km/h; 13.2 mph)
- Capacity: 562,608 cubic feet (15,931 m^{3}) (grain); 499,573 cubic feet (14,146 m^{3}) (bale)
- Complement: 38–62 USMM; 21–40 USNAG
- Armament: Varied by ship; Bow-mounted 3-inch (76 mm)/50-caliber gun; Stern-mounted 4-inch (102 mm)/50-caliber gun; 2–8 × single 20-millimeter (0.79 in) Oerlikon anti-aircraft (AA) cannons and/or, 2–8 × 37-millimeter (1.46 in) M1 AA guns

SS Andrew G. Curtin was a Liberty ship built in the United States during World War II. She was named after Andrew G. Curtin, an American lawyer and politician. He served as the 15th governor of Pennsylvania, during the American Civil War, helped defend his state during the Gettysburg campaign, and oversaw the creation of the National Cemetery and the ceremony in which Abraham Lincoln delivered his famous Gettysburg Address.

== Construction ==
Andrew G. Curtin was laid down on 9 December 1942, under a Maritime Commission (MARCOM) contract, MCE hull 934, by the Bethlehem-Fairfield Shipyard, Baltimore, Maryland; she was sponsored by Mrs. Warren R. Roberts, and was launched on 18 January 1943.

== History ==
She was allocated to Calmar Steamship Corp., on 31 January 1943.

On 26 January 1944, while in Convoy JW 56A to Murmansk, Russia from Loch Ewe, Scotland, she was struck by a torpedo fired from U-716, in her forward hold on the starboard side. She was struck at 00:22, ordered to abandon at 00:30, and sunk at 03:00. The torpedo struck between the #2 and #3 hold which caused the deck to crack ahead of the #3 hold. Andrew G. Curtin had been carrying 9,000 long tons (9,100 t) of general cargo, steel and deck cargo of two locomotives and two PT Boats. Her ship crew consisted of eight officers, one radioman, and thirty-four unlicensed sailors, and a gun crew of one officer and twenty-seven enlisted seamen. Two of the ships crew were drowned and one of the gun crew died in the explosion. The survivors made it to lifeboats or rafts and were picked up by HMS Inconstant. The wreck is at 73°25′N 25°16′E

== Bibliography ==
- "Bethlehem-Fairfield, Baltimore MD". www.ShipbuildingHistory.com. 7 August 2021.
- Maritime Administration. "Andrew G. Curtin". Ship History Database Vessel Status Card. U.S. Department of Transportation, Maritime Administration.
- Davies, James (May 2004). "Specifications (As-Built)" (PDF). p. 23.
- "SS Andrew G. Curtin".
- "Andrew G. Curtin".
