= Convoy JW 56B =

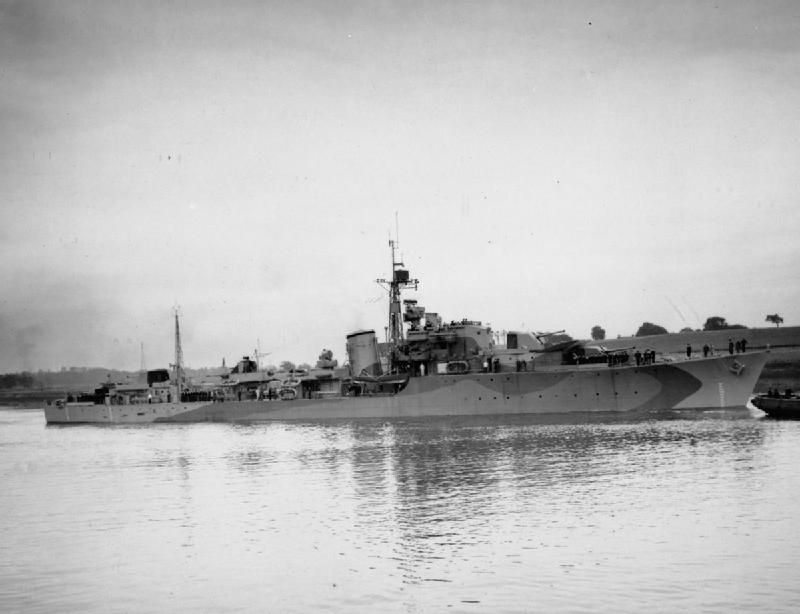
HMS Hardy was hit by a torpedo

Convoy JW 56B was an Arctic convoy sent from Great Britain by the Western Allies to aid the Soviet Union during World War II. It sailed in late January 1944, reaching the Soviet northern ports at the beginning of February. All ships arrived safely. During the voyage JW 56B was attacked by a German U-boat force; no merchant ships were sunk, though one of the escorts was lost. One attacking U-boat was destroyed in the operation.

== Ships ==
The convoy consisted of 17 merchant ships which departed from Loch Ewe on 22 January 1944. Close escort was provided by a force of two destroyers and three other escort vessels. There was also an ocean escort, comprising the destroyer Milne (Capt. IMR Campbell commanding) and six other destroyers. The convoy was accompanied initially by a local escort group from Britain, and was also joined later by a further escort force, from the preceding convoy JW 56A. A cruiser cover force comprising Kent (R.Adm AFE Palliser), Berwick and Bermuda was also at sea, to guard the two convoys against attack by surface units.

JW 56B was opposed by a U-boat force of fifteen boats, code-named Werewolf, in the Barents Sea.

== Action ==
Convoy JW 56B departed Loch Ewe on 22 January 1944, ten days after the preceding convoy, Convoy JW 56A. It was accompanied by its local escort, the destroyer HMS Wrestler, a corvette, and two minesweepers, and the close escort of five warships. On 26 January, the day that Convoy JW 56A came under attack, the local escort departed, to be replaced by the ocean escort of six Home Fleet destroyers. On 29 January the convoy came into the area where Convoy JW 56A had been attacked. Waiting there were the ten U-boats of wolfpack Isengrim (bitter cold), re-inforced with five newcomers and re-organized as the group Werewolf. At midday on 29 January Convoy JW 56B was sighted by U-956 and reported, though U-956 came under attack when she was detected. By the morning of 30 January the U-boats had assembled, but the convoy had also been re-inforced, being joined by the ocean escort of Convoy JW 56A, seven destroyers led by HMS Hardy. Six of the U-boats made contact, mounting thirteen attacks during that day. They were unable to reach the merchant ships, but U-278 hit Hardy with an acoustic torpedo. She was crippled and abandoned, to be sunk later by an attending destroyer. U-314 was destroyed by Whitehall and Meteor. Following this the Werewolf pack abandoned its assault and Convoy JW 56B arrived at Kola three days later, on 2 February.

== Conclusion ==
German U-boat Command (BdU) was delighted with the actions against convoys JW 56A and 56B, believing they had sunk seven escorts and damaged another four, with four ships sunk and a further six damaged. The actual losses from the two convoys were three ships, and one escort sunk and one damaged. Twenty nine ships from both convoys arrived safely.
