= German submarine U-716 =

German World War II submarine

History

Nazi Germany
- Name: U-716
- Ordered: 10 April 1941
- Builder: HC Stülcken & Sohn, Hamburg
- Yard number: 782
- Laid down: 16 April 1942
- Launched: 15 January 1943
- Commissioned: 15 April 1943
- Fate: Surrendered on 9 May 1945; sunk as part of Operation Deadlight on 11 December 1945

General characteristics
- Class & type: Type VIIC submarine
- Displacement: 769 tonnes (757 long tons) surfaced; 871 t (857 long tons) submerged
- Length: 67.10 m (220 ft 2 in) o/a; 50.50 m (165 ft 8 in) pressure hull
- Beam: 6.20 m (20 ft 4 in) o/a; 4.70 m (15 ft 5 in) pressure hull
- Height: 9.60 m (31 ft 6 in)
- Draught: 4.74 m (15 ft 7 in)
- Installed power: 2,800–3,200 PS (2,100–2,400 kW; 2,800–3,200 bhp) (diesels); 750 PS (550 kW; 740 shp) (electric)
- Propulsion: 2 shafts; 2 × diesel engines; 2 × electric motors
- Speed: 17.7 knots (32.8 km/h; 20.4 mph) surfaced; 7.6 knots (14.1 km/h; 8.7 mph) submerged
- Range: 8,500 nmi (15,700 km; 9,800 mi) at 10 knots (19 km/h; 12 mph) surfaced; 80 nmi (150 km; 92 mi) at 4 knots (7.4 km/h; 4.6 mph) submerged
- Test depth: 230 m (750 ft); Crush depth: 250–295 m (820–968 ft)
- Complement: 4 officers, 40–56 enlisted
- Armament: 5 × 53.3 cm (21 in) torpedo tubes (four bow, one stern); 14 × torpedoes; 1 × 8.8 cm (3.46 in) deck gun (220 rounds); 2 × twin 2 cm (0.79 in) C/30 anti-aircraft guns

Service record
- Part of: 5th U-boat Flotilla; 15 April – 31 December 1943; 11th U-boat Flotilla; 1 January – 30 September 1944; 13th U-boat Flotilla; 1 October 1944 – 31 March 1945; 14th U-boat Flotilla; 1 April – 8 May 1945
- Identification codes: M 40 428
- Commanders: Oblt.z.S. Hans Dunkelberg; 15 April 1943 – 24 January 1945; Oblt.z.S. Friedrich-August Greus (acting); 22 January – 12 February 1945; Oblt.z.S. Jürgen Thimme; February – 9 May 1945
- Operations: 10 patrols: 1st patrol: 15 December 1943 – 16 January 1944; 2nd patrol: a. 25 January – 18 February 1944; b. 23 – 24 February 1944; c. 24 February 1944; d. 29 February 1944; 3rd patrol: a. 1 – 7 March 1944; b. 10 – 11 March 1944; 4th patrol: a. 30 March – 17 April 1944; b. 14 – 17 June 1944; 5th patrol: a. 20 June – 22 July 1944; b. 23 – 25 July 1944; c. 26 – 31 July 1944; d. 17 – 22 September 1944; e. 22 – 23 September 1944; f. 6 October 1944; g. 10 October 1944; h. 5 – 6 November 1944; i. 20 – 24 November 1944; j. 3 – 7 December 1944; 6th patrol: a. 7 – 12 January 1945; b. 27 January 1945; c. 3 – 4 February 1945; 7th patrol: 6 – 12 February 1945; 8th patrol: a. 18 – 24 February 1945; b. 25 – 26 February 1945; 9th patrol: 12 March – 9 April 1945; 10th patrol: a. 21 – 28 April 1945; b. 12 May 1945; c. 15 – 19 May 1945
- Victories: 1 merchant ship sunk (7,200 GRT); 1 warship sunk (54 tons)

German submarine U-716 was a Type VIIC U-boat built for Nazi Germany's Kriegsmarine for service during World War II.

== Design ==
German Type VIIC submarines were preceded by the shorter Type VIIB submarines. U-716 had a displacement of 769 tonnes (757 long tons) when at the surface and 871 tonnes (857 long tons) while submerged. She had a total length of 67.10 m (220 ft 2 in), a pressure hull length of 50.50 m (165 ft 8 in), a beam of 6.20 m (20 ft 4 in), a height of 9.60 m (31 ft 6 in), and a draught of 4.74 m (15 ft 7 in). The submarine was powered by two Germaniawerft F46 four-stroke, six-cylinder supercharged diesel engines producing a total of 2,800 to 3,200 metric horsepower (2,060 to 2,350 kW; 2,760 to 3,160 shp) for use while surfaced, two AEG GU 460/8–27 double-acting electric motors producing a total of 750 metric horsepower (550 kW; 740 shp) for use while submerged. She had two shafts and two 1.23 m (4 ft) propellers. The boat was capable of operating at depths of up to 230 metres (750 ft).

The submarine had a maximum surface speed of 17.7 knots (32.8 km/h; 20.4 mph) and a maximum submerged speed of 7.6 knots (14.1 km/h; 8.7 mph). When submerged, the boat could operate for 80 nautical miles (150 km; 92 mi) at 4 knots (7.4 km/h; 4.6 mph); when surfaced, she could travel 8,500 nautical miles (15,700 km; 9,800 mi) at 10 knots (19 km/h; 12 mph). U-716 was fitted with five 53.3 cm (21 in) torpedo tubes (four fitted at the bow and one at the stern), fourteen torpedoes, one 8.8 cm (3.46 in) SK C/35 naval gun, 220 rounds, and two twin 2 cm (0.79 in) C/30 anti-aircraft guns. The boat had a complement of between forty-four and sixty.

== Service history ==
U-716 took part in ten patrols between 15 April 1943 and 8 May 1945. She had her only success sinking the US freighter Andrew G. Curtin when she attacked convoy JW 56A on 26 January 1944. She also took credit for the sinking of US patrol torpedo boat USS PTC-39 being transported by the freighter at the time. While in the Arctic sea on 23 April 1945, U-716 was hit by depth charges by a hunter-killer group. The damage was serious enough to require retreating to Narvik before schedule, but not enough to cause any further problems.

== Fate ==
While in port awaiting repairs, VE Day occurred and the European theatre of the Second World War ended. Upon orders, Jürgen Thimme surrendered his vessel to the Allies in Narvik, Norway on 9 May 1945 and took her to Loch Eriboll in Scotland, where she was destroyed by aerial attack as part of Operation Deadlight on 11 December 1945.

== Summary of raiding history ==
Date	Ship Name	Nationality	Tonnage (Note: Merchant ship tonnages are in gross register tons. Military vessels are listed by tons displacement.)	Fate
26 January 1944	SS Andrew G. Curtin	United States	7,200	Sunk
26 January 1944	USS PTC-39 (Note: Carried by Andrew G. Curtin.)	United States Navy	54	Sunk

== Bibliography ==
- Busch, Rainer; Röll, Hans-Joachim (1999). German U-boat commanders of World War II : a biographical dictionary. Translated by Brooks, Geoffrey. London, Annapolis, Md: Greenhill Books, Naval Institute Press. ISBN 1-55750-186-6.
- Busch, Rainer; Röll, Hans-Joachim (1999). Der U-Boot-Krieg, 1939-1945: Deutsche U-Boot-Verluste von September 1939 bis Mai 1945 [German U-boat losses from September 1939 to May 1945] (in German). Vol. IV. Hamburg, Berlin, Bonn: Mittler. ISBN 3-8132-0514-2.
- Gröner, Eric; Jung, Dieter; Maass, Martin (1991). German Warships 1815-1945: U-boats and Mine Warfare Vessels. Vol. 2. Translated by Thomas, Keith; Magowan, Rachel. London: Conway Maritime Press. ISBN 0-85177-593-4.
