= German submarine U-360 =

German World War II submarine

Coordinates: 72°28′N 13°04′E

History

Nazi Germany
- Name: U-360
- Ordered: 6 August 1940
- Builder: Flensburger Schiffbau-Gesellschaft, Flensburg
- Yard number: 479
- Laid down: 9 August 1941
- Launched: 28 July 1942
- Commissioned: 12 November 1942
- Fate: Sunk on 2 April 1944

General characteristics
- Class & type: Type VIIC submarine
- Displacement: 769 tonnes (757 long tons) surfaced; 871 t (857 long tons) submerged
- Length: 67.10 m (220 ft 2 in) o/a; 50.50 m (165 ft 8 in) pressure hull
- Beam: 6.20 m (20 ft 4 in) o/a; 4.70 m (15 ft 5 in) pressure hull
- Height: 9.60 m (31 ft 6 in)
- Draught: 4.74 m (15 ft 7 in)
- Installed power: 2,800–3,200 PS (2,100–2,400 kW; 2,800–3,200 bhp) (diesels); 750 PS (550 kW; 740 shp) (electric)
- Propulsion: 2 shafts; 2 × diesel engines; 2 × electric motors
- Speed: 17.7 knots (32.8 km/h; 20.4 mph) surfaced; 7.6 knots (14.1 km/h; 8.7 mph) submerged
- Range: 8,500 nmi (15,700 km; 9,800 mi) at 10 knots (19 km/h; 12 mph) surfaced; 80 nmi (150 km; 92 mi) at 4 knots (7.4 km/h; 4.6 mph) submerged
- Test depth: 230 m (750 ft); Crush depth: 250–295 m (820–968 ft)
- Complement: 4 officers, 40–56 enlisted
- Armament: 5 × 53.3 cm (21 in) torpedo tubes (four bow, one stern); 14 × torpedoes or 26 TMA mines; 1 × 8.8 cm (3.46 in) deck gun (220 rounds); 2 × twin 2 cm (0.79 in) C/30 anti-aircraft guns

Service record
- Part of: 5th U-boat Flotilla; 12 November 1942 – 30 June 1943; 13th U-boat Flotilla; 1 July 1943 – 2 April 1944
- Identification codes: M 50 507
- Commanders: Oblt.z.S. Hans-Jürgen Bühring; 12 November 1942 – 20 May 1943; Kptlt. Klaus-Helmuth Becker; 20 May 1943 – 2 April 1944
- Operations: 5 patrols: 1st patrol: 16 August – 24 September 1943; 2nd patrol: 6 October – 19 November 1943; 3rd patrol: 23 – 30 November 1943; 4th patrol: a. 27 December 1943 – 28 January 1944; b. 30 January – 3 February 1944; 5th patrol: 29 March – 2 April 1944
- Victories: 1 merchant ship damaged (7,153 GRT); 1 warship damaged (1,540 tons)

German submarine U-360 was a Type VIIC U-boat of Nazi Germany's Kriegsmarine during World War II.

She carried out five patrols before being sunk in the Norwegian Sea by a British warship on 2 April 1944.

She was a member of five wolfpacks.

She damaged one ship and one warship.

== Design ==
German Type VIIC submarines were preceded by the shorter Type VIIB submarines. U-360 had a displacement of 769 tonnes (757 long tons) when at the surface and 871 tonnes (857 long tons) while submerged. She had a total length of 67.10 m (220 ft 2 in), a pressure hull length of 50.50 m (165 ft 8 in), a beam of 6.20 m (20 ft 4 in), a height of 9.60 m (31 ft 6 in), and a draught of 4.74 m (15 ft 7 in). The submarine was powered by two Germaniawerft F46 four-stroke, six-cylinder supercharged diesel engines producing a total of 2,800 to 3,200 metric horsepower (2,060 to 2,350 kW; 2,760 to 3,160 shp) for use while surfaced, two AEG GU 460/8–27 double-acting electric motors producing a total of 750 metric horsepower (550 kW; 740 shp) for use while submerged. She had two shafts and two 1.23 m (4 ft) propellers. The boat was capable of operating at depths of up to 230 metres (750 ft).

The submarine had a maximum surface speed of 17.7 knots (32.8 km/h; 20.4 mph) and a maximum submerged speed of 7.6 knots (14.1 km/h; 8.7 mph). When submerged, the boat could operate for 80 nautical miles (150 km; 92 mi) at 4 knots (7.4 km/h; 4.6 mph); when surfaced, she could travel 8,500 nautical miles (15,700 km; 9,800 mi) at 10 knots (19 km/h; 12 mph). U-360 was fitted with five 53.3 cm (21 in) torpedo tubes (four fitted at the bow and one at the stern), fourteen torpedoes, one 8.8 cm (3.46 in) SK C/35 naval gun, 220 rounds, and two twin 2 cm (0.79 in) C/30 anti-aircraft guns. The boat had a complement of between forty-four and sixty.

== Service history ==
The submarine was laid down on 9 August 1941 at the Flensburger Schiffbau-Gesellschaft yard at Flensburg as yard number 479, launched on 28 July 1942 and commissioned on 12 November under the command of Oberleutnant zur See Hans-Jügen Bühring.

She served with the 5th U-boat Flotilla from 12 November 1942 and the 13th flotilla from 1 July 1943.

=== First patrol ===
The boat's first patrol was preceded by trips from Kiel in Germany to Bergen and then Narvik in Norway, from where she departed on 16 August 1943. She sailed southwest of Svalbard and west of Bear Island. She docked in Hammerfest on 24 September.

=== Second and third patrols ===
Her second foray was a repeat of her first – finishing in Narvik on 19 November 1943.

The submarine's third patrol took her around Bear Island.

=== Fourth patrol ===
Sortie number four saw the boat damaging HMS Obdurate southeast of Bear Island on 25 January 1944. She also damaged the Fort Bellingham the next day. This ship was subsequently sunk by U-957.

=== Fifth patrol and loss ===
Having moved from Hammerfest to Trondheim, U-360 started her fifth patrol on 29 March 1944. On 2 April, she was sunk southwest of Bear Island by depth charges from the British destroyer HMS Keppel.

51 men died in the U-boat; there were no survivors.

=== Wolfpacks ===
U-360 took part in five wolfpacks, namely:

- Monsun (8 – 21 October 1943)
- Eisenbart (22 October – 17 November 1943)
- Eisenbart (25 – 28 November 1943)
- Isegrim (1 – 27 January 1944)
- Blitz (30 March – 2 April 1944)

== Summary of raiding history ==
| Date | Ship Name | Nationality | Tonnage (Note: Merchant ship tonnages are in gross register tons. Military vessels are listed by tons displacement.) | Fate |
|---|---|---|---|---|
| 25 January 1944 | HMS Obdurate | Royal Navy | 1,540 | Damaged |
| 26 January 1944 | Fort Bellingham | United Kingdom | 7,153 | Damaged |

== Bibliography ==
- Busch, Rainer; Röll, Hans-Joachim (1999). German U-boat commanders of World War II : a biographical dictionary. Translated by Brooks, Geoffrey. London, Annapolis, Md: Greenhill Books, Naval Institute Press. ISBN 1-55750-186-6.
- Busch, Rainer; Röll, Hans-Joachim (1999). Der U-Boot-Krieg, 1939-1945: Deutsche U-Boot-Verluste von September 1939 bis Mai 1945 [German U-boat losses from September 1939 to May 1945] (in German). Vol. IV. Hamburg, Berlin, Bonn: Mittler. ISBN 3-8132-0514-2.
- Gröner, Erich; Jung, Dieter; Maass, Martin (1991). U-boats and Mine Warfare Vessels. German Warships 1815–1945. Vol. 2. Translated by Thomas, Keith; Magowan, Rachel. London: Conway Maritime Press. ISBN 0-85177-593-4.
- Kemp, Paul (1999). U-Boats Destroyed – German Submarine Losses in the World Wars. London: Arms & Armour. ISBN 1-85409-515-3.
