= German submarine U-188 =

German World War II submarine

Coordinates: 44°50′N 00°34′W

History

Nazi Germany
- Name: U-188
- Ordered: 15 August 1940
- Builder: DeSchiMAG, Bremen
- Yard number: 1028
- Laid down: 18 August 1941
- Launched: 31 March 1942
- Commissioned: 5 August 1942
- Fate: Scuttled 25 August 1944 in Bordeaux, later raised and broken up in 1947

General characteristics
- Class & type: Type IXC/40 submarine
- Displacement: 1,144 t (1,126 long tons) surfaced; 1,257 t (1,237 long tons) submerged
- Length: 76.76 m (251 ft 10 in) o/a; 58.75 m (192 ft 9 in) pressure hull
- Beam: 6.86 m (22 ft 6 in) o/a; 4.44 m (14 ft 7 in) pressure hull
- Height: 9.60 m (31 ft 6 in)
- Draught: 4.67 m (15 ft 4 in)
- Installed power: 4,400 PS (3,200 kW; 4,300 bhp) (diesels); 1,000 PS (740 kW; 990 shp) (electric)
- Propulsion: 2 shafts; 2 × diesel engines; 2 × electric motors
- Speed: 18.3 knots (33.9 km/h; 21.1 mph) surfaced; 7.3 knots (13.5 km/h; 8.4 mph) submerged
- Range: 13,850 nmi (25,650 km; 15,940 mi) at 10 knots (19 km/h; 12 mph) surfaced; 63 nmi (117 km; 72 mi) at 4 knots (7.4 km/h; 4.6 mph) submerged
- Test depth: 230 m (750 ft)
- Complement: 4 officers, 44 enlisted
- Armament: 6 × torpedo tubes (4 bow, 2 stern); 22 × 53.3 cm (21 in) torpedoes; 1 × 10.5 cm (4.1 in) SK C/32 deck gun (180 rounds); 1 × 3.7 cm (1.5 in) SK C/30 AA gun; 1 × twin 2 cm FlaK 30 AA guns

Service record
- Part of: 4th U-boat Flotilla; 5 August 1942 – 31 January 1943; 10th U-boat Flotilla; 1 February 1943 – 20 August 1944
- Identification codes: M 10 459
- Commanders: Oblt.z.S. / Kptlt. Siegfried Lüdden; 5 August 1942 – 9 August 1944
- Operations: 3 patrols: 1st patrol: 4 March – 4 May 1943; 2nd patrol: 30 June – 30 October 1943; 3rd patrol: 1 January – 19 June 1944
- Victories: 8 merchant ships sunk (49,725 GRT); 1 warship sunk (1,190 tons); 1 merchant ship damaged (9,977 GRT)

German submarine U-188 was a Type IXC/40 U-boat of Nazi Germany's Kriegsmarine built for service during World War II.

Laid down on 18 August 1941 by Deutsche Schiff- und Maschinenbau AG (DeSchiMAG) of Bremen as yard number 1028, she was launched on 31 March 1942 and commissioned on 5 August under the command of Oberleutnant zur See Siegfried Lüdden.

The boat carried out three patrols and she was a member of three wolfpacks. She sank eight ships and one warship; she also damaged one ship.

She was scuttled at Bordeaux, France on 25 August 1944. The wreck was broken up in 1947.

== Design ==
German Type IXC/40 submarines were slightly larger than the original Type IXCs. U-188 had a displacement of 1,144 tonnes (1,126 long tons) when at the surface and 1,257 tonnes (1,237 long tons) while submerged. The U-boat had a total length of 76.76 m (251 ft 10 in), a pressure hull length of 58.75 m (192 ft 9 in), a beam of 6.86 m (22 ft 6 in), a height of 9.60 m (31 ft 6 in), and a draught of 4.67 m (15 ft 4 in). The submarine was powered by two MAN M 9 V 40/46 supercharged four-stroke, nine-cylinder diesel engines producing a total of 4,400 metric horsepower (3,240 kW; 4,340 shp) for use while surfaced, two Siemens-Schuckert 2 GU 345/34 double-acting electric motors producing a total of 1,000 shaft horsepower (1,010 PS; 750 kW) for use while submerged. She had two shafts and two 1.92 m (6 ft) propellers. The boat was capable of operating at depths of up to 230 metres (750 ft).

The submarine had a maximum surface speed of 18.3 knots (33.9 km/h; 21.1 mph) and a maximum submerged speed of 7.3 knots (13.5 km/h; 8.4 mph). When submerged, the boat could operate for 63 nautical miles (117 km; 72 mi) at 4 knots (7.4 km/h; 4.6 mph); when surfaced, she could travel 13,850 nautical miles (25,650 km; 15,940 mi) at 10 knots (19 km/h; 12 mph). U-188 was fitted with six 53.3 cm (21 in) torpedo tubes (four fitted at the bow and two at the stern), 22 torpedoes, one 10.5 cm (4.13 in) SK C/32 naval gun, 180 rounds, and a 3.7 cm (1.5 in) SK C/30 as well as a 2 cm (0.79 in) C/30 anti-aircraft gun. The boat had a complement of forty-eight.

== Service history ==
=== First patrol ===
U-188 sailed from Kiel on 4 March 1943. She steamed through the gap between Iceland and the Faroe Islands, into the Northern Atlantic Ocean.

The boat's first victim was an old 'four stacker' destroyer, HMS Beverley in mid-Atlantic on 11 April. Less than a month later, the inbound submarine was attacked by an Armstrong-Whitworth Whitley of No. 612 Squadron RAF in the Bay of Biscay on 2 May. The Commander and one crewman were wounded. The crewman died in hospital in Paris on 12 May.

U-188 docked at Lorient in occupied France on 4 May.

=== Second patrol ===
Having left Lorient on 30 June 1943, U-188 headed for the Indian Ocean. She sank Cornelia P. Spencer about 300 nmi (560 km; 350 mi) off the coast of Somalia on 21 September.

She was also successful when she damaged Britannia in the Gulf of Oman on 5 October. This ship was held together by wires and chains on the orders of the master who was known as the 'crazy Norwegian' by the British naval authorities in Bombay. The ship loaded 6,000 tons of oil in Abädän, Iran. She was eventually repaired in Baltimore in March 1944.

The boat crossed the Arabian Sea and the Bay of Bengal before docking at Penang in Malaya (now Malaysia) on 30 October.

=== Third patrol ===
U-188's third and final foray was her longest and most successful. Operating off the Horn of Africa, she sank seven ships in a 171-day patrol. Two of them, Fort la Maune and Samouri were sent to the bottom with no casualties. It was a different story concerning the fate of the Chinese registered Chung Cheng. Twenty men out of seventy-one were lost. The ship sank quickly, probably due to her cargo of 8,350 tons of ilmenite ore.

The boat returned to France, but to Bordeaux on 19 June 1944.

== Fate ==
U-188 was scuttled in Bordeaux to prevent her being captured by the advancing Allies on 25 August 1944. The wreck was broken up in 1947.

== Summary of raiding history ==
| Date | Ship | Nationality | Tonnage (Note: Merchant ship tonnages are in gross register tons. Military vessels are listed by tons displacement.) | Fate |
|---|---|---|---|---|
| 11 April 1943 | HMS Beverley | Royal Navy | 1,190 | Sunk |
| 21 September 1943 | Cornelia P. Spencer | United States | 7,176 | Sunk |
| 5 October 1943 | Britannia | Norway | 9,977 | Damaged |
| 20 January 1944 | Fort Buckingham | United Kingdom | 7,122 | Sunk |
| 25 January 1944 | Fort la Maune | United Kingdom | 7,130 | Sunk |
| 26 January 1944 | Samouri | United Kingdom | 7,219 | Sunk |
| 26 January 1944 | Surada | United Kingdom | 5,427 | Sunk |
| 29 January 1944 | Olga E. Embiricos | Greece | 4,677 | Sunk |
| 3 February 1944 | Chung Cheng | China | 7,176 | Sunk |
| 9 February 1944 | Viva | Norway | 3,798 | Sunk |

== Bibliography ==
- Busch, Rainer; Röll, Hans-Joachim (1999). German U-boat commanders of World War II : a biographical dictionary. Translated by Brooks, Geoffrey. London, Annapolis, Md: Greenhill Books, Naval Institute Press. ISBN 1-55750-186-6.
- Busch, Rainer; Röll, Hans-Joachim (1999). Deutsche U-Boot-Verluste von September 1939 bis Mai 1945 [German U-boat losses from September 1939 to May 1945]. Der U-Boot-Krieg (in German). Vol. IV. Hamburg, Berlin, Bonn: Mittler. ISBN 3-8132-0514-2.
- Gröner, Erich; Jung, Dieter; Maass, Martin (1991). U-boats and Mine Warfare Vessels. German Warships 1815–1945. Vol. 2. Translated by Thomas, Keith; Magowan, Rachel. London: Conway Maritime Press. ISBN 0-85177-593-4.
