= Soviet minesweeper T-111 =

Minesweeper of the Soviet Navy

History

United States
- Name: USS Advocate (AMc-115)
- Builder: Tampa Shipbuilding Company
- Reclassified: AM-138, 21 February 1942
- Laid down: 8 April 1942
- Launched: 1 November 1942
- Completed: 25 June 1943
- Fate: Transferred to the Soviet Union, 25 June 1943
- Reclassified: as MSF-138, 7 February 1955
- Stricken: 1 January 1983

History

Soviet Union
- Name: T-111
- Commissioned: 25 June 1943
- Renamed: TV-25, 3 November 1956
- Fate: Scuttled in the Barents Sea, 1956

General characteristics
- Class & type: Admirable-class minesweeper
- Displacement: 650 tons
- Length: 184 ft 6 in (56.24 m)
- Beam: 33 ft (10 m)
- Draft: 9 ft 9 in (2.97 m)
- Propulsion: 2 × ALCO diesel engines, 1,710 shp (1.3 MW); 2 shafts
- Speed: 15 knots (27.8 km/h)
- Complement: 104
- Armament: 1 × 3"/50 caliber gun; 6 × Oerlikon 20 mm cannon; 4 × Bofors 40 mm L/60 gun; 1 × hedgehog; 4 × Depth charge projectors; 2 × Depth charge racks; 2 × Minesweeping paravanes

T-111 was a minesweeper of the Soviet Navy during World War II and the Cold War. She had originally been built as USS Advocate (AM-138), an Admirable-class minesweeper, for the United States Navy during World War II, but never saw active service in the U.S. Navy. Upon completion she was transferred to the Soviet Union under Lend-Lease as T-111; she was never returned to the United States. The Soviets later scuttled the ship in the Barents Sea in 1956. Because of the Cold War, the U.S. Navy was unaware of this fate and the vessel remained on the American Naval Vessel Register until she was struck on 1 January 1983.

== Career ==
Advocate was laid down on 8 April 1942 at Tampa, Florida, by the Tampa Shipbuilding Co.; launched on 1 November 1942; sponsored by Mrs. A. K. Brown; and completed on 25 June 1943. She was transferred to the Soviet Navy that same day as T-111. She was never returned to U.S. custody.

T-111 was scuttled by the Soviet Navy in the Barents Sea in 1956.

Due to the ongoing Cold War, the U.S. Navy was unaware of this fate. They had reclassified the vessel as MSF-138 on 7 February 1955, and kept her on the American Naval Vessel Register until she was struck on 1 January 1983.
