= HM LST-411 =

LST-1-class tank landing ship

History

United Kingdom
- Name: LST-411
- Ordered: as a Type S3-M-K2 hull, MCE hull 931
- Builder: Bethlehem-Fairfield Shipyard, Baltimore, Maryland
- Yard number: 2183
- Laid down: 21 September 1942
- Launched: 9 November 1942
- Commissioned: 31 December 1942
- Stricken: 13 November 1944
- Identification: Hull symbol: LST-411
- Fate: Lost in action, 1 January 1944, or; 26 January 1944, or; 20 February 1944

General characteristics
- Class & type: LST-1-class tank landing ship
- Displacement: 4,080 long tons (4,145 t) full load; 2,160 long tons (2,190 t) landing
- Length: 328 ft (100 m) oa
- Beam: 50 ft (15 m)
- Draft: Full load: 8 ft 2 in (2.49 m) forward; 14 ft 1 in (4.29 m) aft; Landing at 2,160 t: 3 ft 11 in (1.19 m) forward; 9 ft 10 in (3.00 m) aft
- Installed power: 2 × 900 hp (670 kW) Electro-Motive Diesel 12-567A diesel engines; 1,700 shp (1,300 kW)
- Propulsion: 1 × Falk main reduction gears; 2 × Propellers
- Speed: 12 kn (22 km/h; 14 mph)
- Range: 24,000 nmi (44,000 km; 28,000 mi) at 9 kn (17 km/h; 10 mph) while displacing 3,960 long tons (4,024 t)
- Boats & landing craft carried: 2 or 6 x LCVPs
- Capacity: 2,100 tons oceangoing maximum; 350 tons main deckload
- Troops: 163
- Complement: 117
- Armament: Varied, ultimate armament; 1 × QF 12-pounder 12 cwt naval gun; 6 × 20 mm (0.79 in) Oerlikon cannon; 4 × Fast Aerial Mine (FAM) mounts

HMS LST-411 was a United States Navy LST-1-class tank landing ship that was transferred to the Royal Navy during World War II. As with many of her class, the ship was never named. Instead, she was referred to by her hull designation.

== Construction ==
LST-411 was laid down on 21 September 1942, under United States Maritime Commission (MARCOM) contract, MC hull 931, by the Bethlehem-Fairfield Shipyard, Baltimore, Maryland; launched 9 November 1942; then transferred to the United Kingdom and commissioned on 31 December 1942.

== Service history ==
LST-411 saw no active service in the United States Navy. There are several reported sinking dates for LST-411: the site [Uboat.net] states that she struck a mine and was lost in action on 26 January 1944; [NavSource] claims she was mined or torpedoed 20 February 1944; while the US Navy says she was lost in action 1 January 1944. She was struck from the Navy list on 13 November 1944.

== See also ==
- List of United States Navy LSTs

== Notes ==
Citations

== Bibliography ==
Online resources

- "LST-411". Dictionary of American Naval Fighting Ships. Naval History and Heritage Command. This article incorporates text from this source, which is in the public domain.
- "Bethlehem-Fairfield, Baltimore MD". ShipbuildingHistory.com. 14 August 2008.
- "USS LST-411". NavSource. 15 November 2004.
- Helgason, Guðmundur. "HMS LST-411". German U-boats of WWII - uboat.net.
