= HM LST-422 =

1942 LST-1-class tank landing ship

History

United Kingdom
- Name: LST-422
- Ordered: as a Type S3-M-K2 hull, MCE hull 942
- Builder: Bethlehem-Fairfield Shipyard, Baltimore, Maryland
- Yard number: 2192
- Laid down: 12 November 1942
- Launched: 10 December 1942
- Commissioned: 4 February 1943
- Stricken: 16 May 1944
- Identification: Hull symbol: LST-422
- Fate: Lost in action, 26 January 1944

General characteristics
- Class & type: LST-1-class tank landing ship
- Displacement: 4,080 long tons (4,145 t) full load; 2,160 long tons (2,190 t) landing
- Length: 328 ft (100 m) oa
- Beam: 50 ft (15 m)
- Draft: Full load: 8 ft 2 in (2.49 m) forward; 14 ft 1 in (4.29 m) aft; Landing at 2,160 t: 3 ft 11 in (1.19 m) forward; 9 ft 10 in (3.00 m) aft
- Installed power: 2 × 900 hp (670 kW) Electro-Motive Diesel 12-567A diesel engines; 1,700 shp (1,300 kW)
- Propulsion: 1 × Falk main reduction gears; 2 × Propellers
- Speed: 12 kn (22 km/h; 14 mph)
- Range: 24,000 nmi (44,000 km; 28,000 mi) at 9 kn (17 km/h; 10 mph) while displacing 3,960 long tons (4,024 t)
- Boats & landing craft carried: 2 or 6 x LCVPs
- Capacity: 2,100 tons oceangoing maximum; 350 tons main deckload
- Troops: 163
- Complement: 117
- Armament: Varied, ultimate armament; 1 × QF 12-pounder 12 cwt naval gun; 6 × 20 mm (0.79 in) Oerlikon cannon; 4 × Fast Aerial Mine (FAM) mounts

HMS LST-422 was a United States Navy LST-1-class tank landing ship that was transferred to the Royal Navy during World War II. As with many of her class, the ship was never named. Instead, she was referred to by her hull designation.

== Construction ==
LST-422 was laid down on 12 November 1942, under Maritime Commission (MARCOM) contract, MC hull 942, by the Bethlehem-Fairfield Shipyard, Baltimore, Maryland; launched 10 December 1942; then transferred to the United Kingdom and commissioned on 4 February 1943.

== Service history ==
LST-422 saw no active service in the United States Navy. The tank landing ship was lost in action while in Royal Navy service 26 January 1944, when she struck a mine off Anzio, Italy.

LST-422 was carrying the C and D Companies, and the Headquarters of the US Army's 83rd Chemical Battalion, Motorized and also members of the 68th Coast Guard Artillery Battalion, at the time. She had departed Naples, along with 12 other LSTs, the night of 25 January 1944, with a capacity load of trucks, most likely GMC 2½-ton trucks, jeeps, M3 Half-track, ambulances, and other vehicles. In addition, she was carrying 50-US-gallon (190 L; 42 imp gal) steel barrels of gasoline on her deck, along with a variety of ammunition. The 83rd utilized 4.2-inch (110 mm) mortars firing either white phosphorus, smoke, gas, or high explosive shells.

LST-422 had arrived off of Anzio, around 01:00, after sailing through deteriorating weather and high, gale force, winds, and set anchor. With waves at 20 to 30 ft (6.1 to 9.1 m) and continued gale-force winds, the LST was blown into a known mine field located around 12 mi (19 km) offshore. At 05:20 an explosion ripped open a 50 ft (15 m) hole in the bottom starboard side of the ship, between the main and auxiliary engine rooms, which immediately ignited the ship's fuel oil supply.

The tank deck was the first to flood, with most of the men of the 83rd asleep on this deck over 400 men were unable to escape. The vehicles on the tank deck, which were fueled and loaded with ammunition, began to explode, which in turn ignited the gasoline that had been stored on the top deck. With all power lost, it was impossible to contact the engine room and with the fires it was impossible to reach the mess deck where the fire fighting suits and helmets were stored. The auxiliary fire foam motor had been damaged by flying shrapnel and could not be started.

The order was given for the US Army personnel to abandon ship, however, only four life rafts were undamaged, so any floatable loose materials were thrown overboard to assist men that were already in the water.

LST-301 came to assist but many of the men who had jumped into the frigid waters perished before being rescued. LCI-32 also tried to assist LST-422, but struck a mine herself and sunk with a loss of 30 of her crew. Soon the minesweepers Pilot and Strive, along with LST-16, YMS-34, YMS-43, and other YMS craft joined in the rescue and were able to pull 150 survivors from LST-422 and LCI-32 from the storm tossed waters.

Lieutenant Commander Braodhurst, along with eight of his crew, finally abandoned ship at about 06:00. At 14:30 LST-422 broke in two and sank.

She was struck from the Navy list on 16 May 1944.

== See also ==
- List of United States Navy LSTs

== Notes ==
Citations

== Bibliography ==
Online resources

- "LST-422". Dictionary of American Naval Fighting Ships. Naval History and Heritage Command. This article incorporates text from this source, which is in the public domain.
- "Bethlehem-Fairfield, Baltimore MD". www.ShipbuildingHistory.com. 14 August 2008.
- "USS LST-422". NavSource. 16 January 2009.
- Helgason, Guðmundur. "HMS LST-422". German U-boats of WWII - uboat.net.
- Rhoads, George. "The Sinking of the LST-422".
