= HMS Hardy (R08) =

Destroyer of the Royal Navy

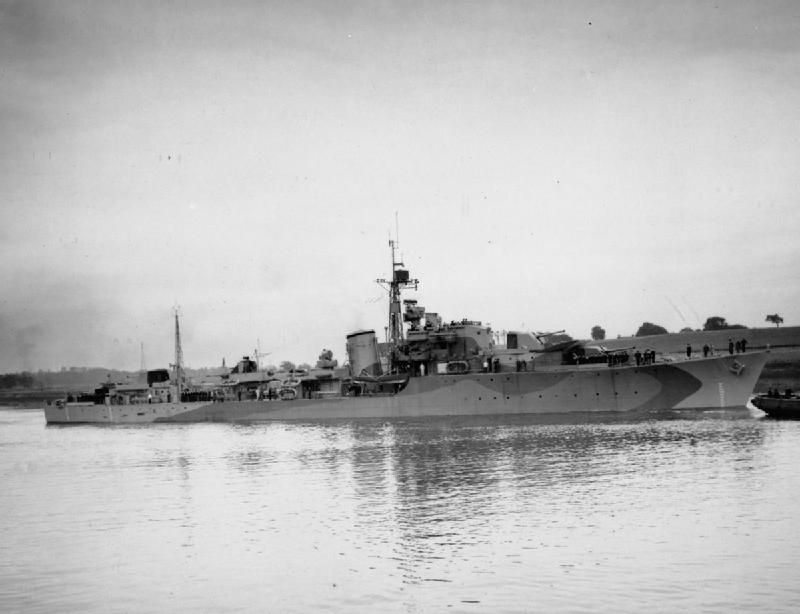
- Hardy in August 1943

History

United Kingdom
- Name: HMS Hardy
- Ordered: 1 September 1941
- Builder: John Brown & Company, Clydebank, Scotland
- Laid down: 14 May 1942
- Launched: 18 March 1943
- Commissioned: August 1943
- Identification: Pennant number:R08
- Honours and awards: Arctic 1943-44
- Fate: Scuttled after being torpedoed on 30 January 1944

General characteristics
- Class & type: V-class destroyer
- Displacement: 1,777 long tons (1,806 t) standard; 2,058 long tons (2,091 t) full load
- Length: 363 ft (111 m)
- Beam: 35 ft 8 in (10.87 m)
- Draught: 10 ft (3.0 m)
- Propulsion: 2 × Admiralty 3-drum water-tube boilers; Geared steam turbines, 40,000 shp (29,828 kW); 2 shafts
- Speed: 37 knots (43 mph; 69 km/h)
- Range: 4,860 nmi (9,000 km) at 29 kn (54 km/h)
- Complement: 180 (225 in flotilla leader)
- Armament: Original configuration : 4 × QF 4.7-inch (120-mm) Mk IX guns in single mountings CP Mk.XXII; 2 × QF 40 mm Bofors guns in twin mount Mk.IV; 6 × QF 20 mm Oerlikon guns; 2 × twin mounts Mk.V, 2 × single mounts Mk.III; 2 × quadruple tubes for 21-inch (530 mm) torpedoes Mk.IX

HMS Hardy was a V-class destroyer of the Royal Navy that saw service during the Second World War.

== History ==
Hardy was built by John Brown & Company, Clydebank, laid down on 14 May 1942, launched 18 March 1943, and completed 14 August 1943.

While escorting Convoy JW 56A during the Second World War, Hardy was torpedoed and damaged in the Arctic Ocean at 73°40′N 24°30′E by the German submarine U-278 on 30 January 1944 with the loss of 35 crew members. The British destroyers HMS Venus and HMS Virago rescued her survivors and sank her. HMS Virago sustained damage to her bow while in contact with Hardy which was later repaired by Russian workers while at the convoy destination in Murmansk.

== See also ==
- Arctic convoys of World War II
