= German submarine U-957 =

German World War II submarine

History

Nazi Germany
- Name: U-957
- Ordered: 10 April 1941
- Builder: Blohm & Voss, Hamburg
- Yard number: 157
- Laid down: 11 March 1942
- Launched: 21 November 1942
- Commissioned: 7 January 1943
- Decommissioned: 21 October 1944
- Fate: Probably scuttled in May 1945

General characteristics
- Class & type: Type VIIC submarine
- Displacement: 769 tonnes (757 long tons) surfaced; 871 t (857 long tons) submerged
- Length: 67.10 m (220 ft 2 in) o/a; 50.50 m (165 ft 8 in) pressure hull
- Beam: 6.20 m (20 ft 4 in) o/a; 4.70 m (15 ft 5 in) pressure hull
- Height: 9.60 m (31 ft 6 in)
- Draught: 4.74 m (15 ft 7 in)
- Installed power: 2,800–3,200 PS (2,100–2,400 kW; 2,800–3,200 bhp) (diesels); 750 PS (550 kW; 740 shp) (electric)
- Propulsion: 2 shafts; 2 × diesel engines; 2 × electric motors
- Speed: 17.7 knots (32.8 km/h; 20.4 mph) surfaced; 7.6 knots (14.1 km/h; 8.7 mph) submerged
- Range: 8,500 nmi (15,700 km; 9,800 mi) at 10 knots (19 km/h; 12 mph) surfaced; 80 nmi (150 km; 92 mi) at 4 knots (7.4 km/h; 4.6 mph) submerged
- Test depth: 230 m (750 ft); Crush depth: 250–295 m (820–968 ft)
- Complement: 4 officers, 40–56 enlisted
- Armament: 5 × 53.3 cm (21 in) torpedo tubes (four bow, one stern); 14 × torpedoes or 26 TMA mines; 1 × 8.8 cm (3.46 in) deck gun (220 rounds); 1 × twin 2 cm (0.79 in) C/30 anti-aircraft gun

Service record
- Part of: 5th U-boat Flotilla; 7 January – 31 July 1943; 3rd U-boat Flotilla; 1 August – 31 December 1943; 11th U-boat Flotilla; 1 January – 30 September 1944; 13th U-boat Flotilla; 1 – 21 October 1944
- Identification codes: M 50 029
- Commanders: Oblt.z.S. Franz Saar; 7 January – 20 March 1943; Oblt.z.S. Gerhard Schaar; 1 April 1943 – 21 October 1944
- Operations: 7 patrols: 1st patrol: 14 December 1943 – 12 January 1944; 2nd patrol: 24 January – 2 February 1944; 3rd patrol: a. 6 – 20 February 1944; b. 22 – 25 February 1944; 4th patrol: a. 26 February – 4 March 1944; b. 29 April – 2 May 1944; 5th patrol: a. 11 May – 8 June 1944; b. 14 – 15 June 1944; c. 23 June 1944; d. 26 – 28 June 1944; e. 2 – 3 July 1944; f. 18 – 20 July 1944; 6th patrol: 23 July – 3 September 1944; 7th patrol: a. 7 September – 3 October 1944; b. 6 – 8 October 1944; c. 17 – 21 October 1944
- Victories: 2 merchant ships sunk (7,564 GRT); 2 warships sunk (604 tons)

German submarine U-957 was a Type VIIC U-boat of Nazi Germany's Kriegsmarine during World War II.

Laid down by Blohm & Voss, Hamburg on 11 March 1942, the U-boat was launched on 21 November 1942, and commissioned on 7 January 1943, by Oberleutnant zur See Franz Saar.

== Design ==
German Type VIIC submarines were preceded by the shorter Type VIIB submarines. U-957 had a displacement of 769 tonnes (757 long tons) when at the surface and 871 tonnes (857 long tons) while submerged. She had a total length of 67.10 m (220 ft 2 in), a pressure hull length of 50.50 m (165 ft 8 in), a beam of 6.20 m (20 ft 4 in), a height of 9.60 m (31 ft 6 in), and a draught of 4.74 m (15 ft 7 in). The submarine was powered by two Germaniawerft F46 four-stroke, six-cylinder supercharged diesel engines producing a total of 2,800 to 3,200 metric horsepower (2,060 to 2,350 kW; 2,760 to 3,160 shp) for use while surfaced, two Brown, Boveri & Cie GG UB 720/8 double-acting electric motors producing a total of 750 metric horsepower (550 kW; 740 shp) for use while submerged. She had two shafts and two 1.23 m (4 ft) propellers. The boat was capable of operating at depths of up to 230 metres (750 ft).

The submarine had a maximum surface speed of 17.7 knots (32.8 km/h; 20.4 mph) and a maximum submerged speed of 7.6 knots (14.1 km/h; 8.7 mph). When submerged, the boat could operate for 80 nautical miles (150 km; 92 mi) at 4 knots (7.4 km/h; 4.6 mph); when surfaced, she could travel 8,500 nautical miles (15,700 km; 9,800 mi) at 10 knots (19 km/h; 12 mph). U-957 was fitted with five 53.3 cm (21 in) torpedo tubes (four fitted at the bow and one at the stern), fourteen torpedoes, one 8.8 cm (3.46 in) SK C/35 naval gun, 220 rounds, and one twin 2 cm (0.79 in) C/30 anti-aircraft gun. The boat had a complement of between forty-four and sixty.

== Service history ==
Under the command of Oberleutnant zur See Gerhard Schaar U-957 carried out seven war patrols between December 1943 and October 1944, sinking two commercial vessels; the British Fort Bellingham and the Soviet survey vessel Nord; and two military vessels, the American submarine chaser USS PTC-38, and the Soviet corvette Brilliant.

=== Fate ===
Her combat career ended on 19 October 1944 at Lofoten, Norway, when she collided with a German steamer. On 21 October 1944 she was taken out of service in Trondheim.

In May 1945, she was probably scuttled in the Skjömenfjord.

== Summary of raiding history ==
Date	Ship Name	Nationality	Tonnage (Note: Merchant ship tonnages are in gross register tons. Military vessels are listed by tons displacement.)	Fate
26 January 1944	Fort Bellingham	United Kingdom	7,153	Sunk
26 January 1944	USS PTC-38	United States Navy	54	Sunk
26 August 1944	Nord	Soviet Navy	411	Sunk
23 September 1944	Brilliant	Soviet Navy	550	Sunk

== Bibliography ==
- Busch, Rainer; Röll, Hans-Joachim (1999). German U-boat commanders of World War II : a biographical dictionary. Translated by Brooks, Geoffrey. London, Annapolis, Md: Greenhill Books, Naval Institute Press. ISBN 1-55750-186-6.
- Busch, Rainer; Röll, Hans-Joachim (1999). Der U-Boot-Krieg, 1939-1945: Deutsche U-Boot-Verluste von September 1939 bis Mai 1945 [German U-boat losses from September 1939 to May 1945] (in German). Vol. IV. Hamburg, Berlin, Bonn: Mittler. ISBN 3-8132-0514-2.
- Gröner, Eric; Jung, Dieter; Maass, Martin (1991). German Warships 1815-1945: U-boats and Mine Warfare Vessels. Vol. 2. Translated by Thomas, Keith; Magowan, Rachel. London: Conway Maritime Press. ISBN 0-85177-593-4.
- Sharpe, Peter (1998). U-Boat Fact File. Great Britain: Midland Publishing. ISBN 1-85780-072-9.
