= HMS Inconstant (H49) =

Destroyer of the Royal Navy

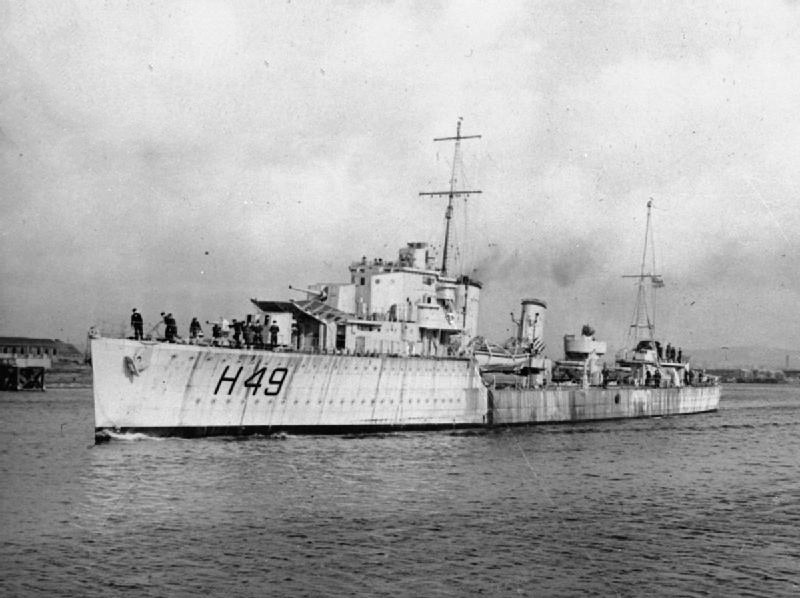
- Inconstant in 1941

History

United Kingdom
- Name: Inconstant
- Builder: Vickers-Armstrongs
- Laid down: 24 May 1939, as Muavenet
- Launched: 24 February 1941
- Commissioned: 24 January 1942
- Decommissioned: 1946
- Identification: Pennant number: H49
- Fate: Returned to Turkey, 9 March 1946

Turkey
- Name: Muavenet
- Acquired: 9 March 1946
- Fate: Scrapped, 1960

General characteristics (as built)
- Class & type: I-class destroyer
- Displacement: 1,360 long tons (1,380 t) (standard); 1,880 long tons (1,910 t) (deep load)
- Length: 323 ft (98.5 m) (o/a)
- Beam: 33 ft (10.1 m)
- Draught: 12 ft 6 in (3.8 m)
- Installed power: 3 Admiralty 3-drum boilers; 34,000 shp (25,000 kW)
- Propulsion: 2 shafts, 2 geared steam turbines
- Speed: 35.5 knots (65.7 km/h; 40.9 mph)
- Range: 5,500 nmi (10,200 km; 6,300 mi) at 15 knots (28 km/h; 17 mph)
- Complement: 145
- Sensors & processing systems: ASDIC; Type 286 search radar
- Armament: 4 × single 4.7 in (120 mm) guns; 1 × single 12 pdr (3 in (76 mm)) AA gun; 4 × single 20 mm (0.8 in) AA guns; 1 × quadruple 21 in (533 mm) torpedo tubes; 1 × rack and 2 throwers for 35 depth charges

Service record
- Operations: Operation Ironclad (1942)
- Victories: Sank U-409 and U-767

HMS Inconstant was an I-class destroyer built for the Turkish Navy, but was purchased by the Royal Navy in 1939.

== Description ==
The I-class ships were improved versions of the preceding H class. They displaced 1,370 long tons (1,390 t) at standard load and 1,888 long tons (1,918 t) at deep load. The ships had an overall length of 323 feet (98.5 m), a beam of 33 feet (10.1 m) and a draught of 12 feet 6 inches (3.8 m). They were powered by two Parsons geared steam turbines, each driving one propeller shaft, using steam provided by three Admiralty three-drum boilers. The turbines developed a total of 34,000 shaft horsepower (25,000 kW) and were intended to give a maximum speed of 35.5 knots (65.7 km/h; 40.9 mph). The ships carried enough fuel oil to give them a range of 5,500 nautical miles (10,200 km; 6,300 mi) at 15 knots (28 km/h; 17 mph). Their crew numbered 145 officers and ratings.

The Turkish ships mounted four 4.7-inch (120 mm) Mark IX guns in single mounts, designated 'A', 'B', 'X' and 'Y' from bow to stern. While under construction, their anti-aircraft (AA) armament was augmented by a single 12-pounder (3 in (76 mm)) AA gun that replaced the planned aft set of torpedo tubes. In addition the intended pair of quadruple mounts for the 0.5 inch Vickers Mark III machine gun were replaced by a pair of 20-millimeter (0.8 in) Oerlikon light AA guns. They were fitted with a single above-water quadruple torpedo tube mount amidships for 21-inch (533 mm) torpedoes. One depth charge rack and two throwers were fitted for 35 depth charges. The Turkish ships were fitted with the ASDIC sound detection system to locate submarines underwater and a Type 286 search radar.

== Construction and career ==
Inconstant was laid down as TCG Muavenet for the Turkish Navy by Vickers Armstrong at their Barrow-in-Furness shipyard on 24 May 1939, purchased in September 1939 by the Royal Navy, launched on 24 February 1941, and commissioned on 24 January 1942. The ship participated in the assault on Madagascar in May 1942 and attacked & sank the German submarines U-409 in the Mediterranean north-east of Algiers on 12 July 1943 and U-767 while in company with the destroyers Fame and Havelock in the English Channel south-west of Guernsey on 18 June 1944. Inconstant was returned to Turkey on 9 March 1946 and renamed Muavenet. She was discarded in 1960.

== Bibliography ==
- Colledge, J. J.; Warlow, Ben (2006) [1969]. Ships of the Royal Navy: The Complete Record of All Fighting Ships of the Royal Navy from the 15th Century to the Present (3rd Rev ed.). London: Chatham Publishing. ISBN 978-1-86176-281-8. OCLC 67375475.
- English, John (1993). Amazon to Ivanhoe: British Standard Destroyers of the 1930s. Kendal, England: World Ship Society. ISBN 0-905617-64-9.
- Friedman, Norman (2006). British Destroyers & Frigates: The Second World War and After. Annapolis, Maryland: Naval Institute Press. ISBN 1-86176-137-6.
- Hodges, Peter & Friedman, Norman (1979). Destroyer Weapons of World War 2. Greenwich: Conway Maritime Press. ISBN 978-0-85177-137-3.
- Lenton, H. T. (1998). British & Empire Warships of the Second World War. Annapolis, Maryland: Naval Institute Press. ISBN 1-55750-048-7.
- Rohwer, Jürgen (2005). Chronology of the War at Sea 1939–1945: The Naval History of World War Two (Third Revised ed.). Annapolis, Maryland: Naval Institute Press. ISBN 1-59114-119-2.
- Whitley, M. J. (1988). Destroyers of World War Two: An International Encyclopedia. Annapolis, Maryland: Naval Institute Press. ISBN 0-87021-326-1.
