= February 1944 =

Month of 1944

<<	February 1944					>>
Su	Mo	Tu	We	Th	Fr	Sa
		1	2	3	4	5
6	7	8	9	10	11	12
13	14	15	16	17	18	19
20	21	22	23	24	25	26
27	28	29

The following events occurred in February 1944:

== February 1, 1944 (Tuesday) ==
- The Soviets began the Kingisepp–Gdov Offensive. The Soviet 2nd Shock Army captured Kingisepp.
- Japanese destroyer Umikaze was torpedoed and sunk off Truk by the American submarine Guardfish.
- The French Forces of the Interior (FFI) was created, unifying all French Resistance movements.
- Clothing restrictions were ended in Britain after two years, lifting unpopular limitations on the number of buttons, pockets and pleats on clothes.
- The Bolu–Gerede earthquake killed almost 4,000 people in Turkey.
- Died: Franz Kutschera, 39, Austrian Nazi politician, SS-Brigadeführer and war criminal (assassinated by Polish Resistance fighters in Operation Kutschera); Piet Mondrian, 71, Dutch painter

== February 2, 1944 (Wednesday) ==
- The Battle of Cisterna ended in German victory.
- The Battle of Narva began on the Eastern Front. The Battle for Narva Bridgehead began that day.
- Born: Geoffrey Hughes, actor, in Wallasey, England (d. 2012)

== February 3, 1944 (Thursday) ==
- German forces counterattacked at Anzio and effectively sealed the beachhead.
- The Battle of Kwajalein ended in United States victory.
- Born: Trisha Noble, singer and actress, in Marrickville, New South Wales, Australia (d. 2021)
- Died: Yvette Guilbert, 79, French cabaret singer and actress

== February 4, 1944 (Friday) ==
- The Soviet 42nd Army captured Gdov.
- German submarine U-854 struck a mine and sank in the Baltic Sea.

== February 5, 1944 (Saturday) ==
- The Battle of the Admin Box began in the Burma Campaign.
- In the Ukrainian sector, the Soviet 13th and 60th Armies captured Lutsk and Rovno.
- Born: Al Kooper, songwriter, record producer and musician, in Brooklyn, New York

== February 6, 1944 (Sunday) ==
- German submarine U-177 was depth charged and sunk off Ascension Island in the South Atlantic by an American B-24.
- Over the night of February 6/7 some 200 Soviet bombers attacked Helsinki, the heaviest bombing of the Finnish capital since the war began.

== February 7, 1944 (Monday) ==
- President Roosevelt asked Stalin not to allow the Polish border issue to undermine future international co-operation. Roosevelt proposed that the Polish Prime Minister accept the desired territorial changes and then be allowed to alter the makeup of his government without any evidence of foreign pressure.
- With the Red Army approaching Estonia's borders, Prime Minister Jüri Uluots broadcast a speech over the radio calling on the Estonian people to fight alongside the Germans against the bigger perceived threat to Estonian freedom.

== February 8, 1944 (Tuesday) ==
- The German prisoner transport ship Petrella was sunk off Crete with the loss of 2,670 Italian POWs aboard.
- The Japanese troopship Lima Maru was torpedoed and sunk southeast of the Gotō Islands by the American submarine USS Snook (SS-279). The ship sank quickly and as many as 2,765 lives were lost.
- The Brazzaville Conference concluded.
- Born:
  - Roger Lloyd-Pack, actor, in Islington, London, England (d. 2014)
  - Sebastião Salgado, photographer and photojournalist, in Aimorés, Brazil (d. 2025)
  - Isao Shibata, former Japanese baseball player (Tokyo Yomiuri Giants), in Yokohama, Kanagawa Prefecture

== February 9, 1944 (Wednesday) ==
- During the Battle of Anzio, German forces captured Aprilia from the British 1st Infantry Division which continued to hold "The Factory".
- German submarines U-238 and U-734 were both sunk southwest of Ireland by British warships.
- Bishop of Chichester George Bell started a debate in the House of Lords over the morality of the bombing of European cities when he made a speech questioning the practice. "I recognize the legitimacy of concentrated attack on industrial and military objectives, on airfields and air bases, in view especially of the coming of the Second Front," the Bishop said. "I fully realize that in attacks on centres of war industry and transport the killing of civilians when it is the result of bona-fide military activity is inevitable. But there must be a fair balance between the means employed and the purpose achieved. To obliterate a whole town because certain portions contain military and industrial establishments is to reject the balance ... How can there be discrimination in such matters when civilians, monuments, military objectives and industrial objectives all together form the target? How can the bombers aim at anything more than a great space when they see nothing and the bombing is blind?"
- Born: Alice Walker, author and activist, in Putnam County, Georgia

== February 10, 1944 (Thursday) ==
- The Landing at Saidor ended in Allied victory.
- The Japanese destroyer Minekaze was sunk south of Formosa by the American submarine Pogy.
- German submarine U-545 was scuttled after being depth charged and crippled west of the Hebrides by a Vickers Wellington of No. 612 Squadron RAF.
- German submarine U-666 went missing on patrol in the North Atlantic and never returned.
- Born: Peter Allen, singer-songwriter, in Tenterfield, New South Wales, Australia (d. 1992)

== February 11, 1944 (Friday) ==
- At the Anzio beachhead, German forces captured "The Factory" from the British 1st Division.
- The Soviets announced the recapture of Shepetovka.
- German submarine U-283 was sunk southwest of the Faroe Islands by a Wellington bomber of 407 Squadron, Royal Canadian Air Force.
- German submarine U-424 was depth charged and sunk southwest of Ireland by British sloops Wild Goose and Woodpecker.
- Sermon denouncing racial prejudice at Saint Louis University, a Catholic, Div 1 research school in Missouri, delivered by Father Claude H. Heithaus, S. J. Fr. Hiethaus was promptly, forcibly transferred out of state, but less than 6 months later, the first 5 negroes enrolled at SLU in summer of '44. SLU became the first historically white institution of higher learning in a former slave state to admit persons of color.
- Born: Mike Oxley politician, in Findlay, Ohio (d. 2016)
- Died: Carl Meinhof, 86, German linguist

== February 12, 1944 (Saturday) ==
- During the Battle of the Korsun–Cherkassy Pocket, the German III Panzerkorps captured Vinograd and Lysianka but could make no more progress in relieving the Korsun pocket.
- The German steamboat Oria sank in a storm sailing from Rhodes to Piraeus with over 4,000 Italian prisoners of war aboard. It was one of the worst disasters of all time in the Mediterranean Sea.
- The British troop ship Khedive Ismail was torpedoed and sunk in the Indian Ocean with the loss of 1,297 people by Japanese submarine I-27, which was then sunk by British warships.
- Japanese submarine Ro-110 was depth charged and sunk in the Bay of Bengal by Allied warships.
- Born: Moe Bandy, country music singer, in Meridian, Mississippi
- Died: Kenneth Gandar-Dower, 35, English sportsman, explorer and author (killed in the sinking of the Khedive Ismail); Margaret Woodrow Wilson, 57, eldest daughter of U.S. President Woodrow Wilson and First Lady after her mother's death

== February 13, 1944 (Sunday) ==
- The Allies dropped weapons for the Resistance in Haute-Savoie.
- Aircraft of the 14th U.S. Army Air Force raided Hong Kong.
- The submarine rescue ship USS Macaw sank at Midway Island after running aground.
- The Norwegian cargo ship Henry and passenger ship Irma were controversially sunk off Kristiansund by two ships of the Royal Norwegian Navy, who claimed the Irma and Henry were without lights or national markings.
- Born: Sal Bando, baseball player, in Cleveland, Ohio (d. 2023); Stockard Channing, actress, in New York City; Michael Ensign, actor, in Safford, Arizona; Jerry Springer, news anchor, 56th Mayor of Cincinnati and tabloid talk show host, in London, England (d. 2023)
- Died: Edgar Selwyn, 68, American actor, director and producer of stage and screen

== February 14, 1944 (Monday) ==
- Action of 14 February 1944: In one of the few naval engagements in the Asian and Pacific theater to involve German and Italian forces, the British submarine Tally-Ho sank the German-commanded U-boat UIT-23 (formerly the Italian submarine Giuliani).
- The United States declared neutrality in the border dispute between Poland and the Soviet Union.
- Born: Carl Bernstein, investigative journalist and author, in Washington, D.C.; Alan Parker, filmmaker, in Islington, London, England (d. 2020)

== February 15, 1944 (Tuesday) ==
- As part of the Battle of Narva, the Soviets began the first Narva Offensive.
- New Zealand troops landed on the Green Islands.
- Japanese cruiser Agono was torpedoed north of Truk by the American submarine Skate and sank two days later.
- Born: Dzhokhar Dudayev, Soviet Air Force general and 1st President of the Chechen Republic of Ichkeria, in Yalkhoroy, Chechen-Ingush ASSR (d. 1996)

== February 16, 1944 (Wednesday) ==
- The Battle of the Korsun–Cherkassy Pocket ended in Soviet victory. Most of the German forces managed to escape but left much heavy equipment behind.
- American forces launched Operation Hailstone, a massive attack against the Japanese naval and air base at Truk in the Caroline Islands.
- 800 Allied aircraft raided Berlin. In his post-raid report, Joseph Goebbels attempted the unusual tactic of exaggerating the damage done in the hope that the Allies might think that the capital was no longer an important target.
- Lord Chancellor John Simon appeared before the House of Lords and made a speech defending the British bombing campaign. Referring specifically to the monastery at Monte Cassino, he said that most of the buildings there dated from the nineteenth century and that the most valuable art treasures and manuscripts had been moved elsewhere weeks and months earlier.
- Stalin responded to Roosevelt's message of February 7 by saying the Polish government was made up of elements hostile to the Soviet Union and was incapable of friendly relations with the USSR. Stalin advised that "The basic improvement of the Polish government appears to be an urgent task."
- The war film Passage to Marseille starring Humphrey Bogart and Michèle Morgan was released.
- Born: Richard Ford, novelist and short story writer, in Jackson, Mississippi; António Mascarenhas Monteiro, 2nd President of Cape Verde, in Ribeira da Barca, Portuguese Cape Verde (d. 2016)
- Died: Henri Nathansen, 75, Danish writer and stage director (suicide)

== February 17, 1944 (Thursday) ==
- Operation Hailstone ended in United States victory. The Japanese lost 3 cruisers, 4 destroyers, 3 auxiliary cruisers, 2 submarine tenders, 3 smaller warships, 32 merchant ships and 270 aircraft at Truk.
- The Battle of Eniwetok began in the Marshall Islands when American forces landed on Eniwetok Atoll.
- The Battle of Karavia Bay began in the Rabaul area of New Britain when U.S. Navy warships attacked the harbor defenses of Karavia Bay.
- Born:
  - Bernie Grant, British Labour Party politician, in Georgetown, Guyana (d. 2000)
  - Karl Jenkins, musician and composer, in Penclawdd, Wales
  - Nick Hewer, British public relations consultant and television presenter in Swindon, England

== February 18, 1944 (Friday) ==
- The Battle of Karavia Bay ended in American victory and a blockade of the Japanese-held port.
- Operation Jericho: Allied aircraft raided Amiens prison in German-occupied France, breaching its walls and allowing 258 prisoners to escape.
- The Soviet 1st Shock Army captured Staraya Russa.
- The Japanese destroyer Oite was sunk off Truk by American aircraft participating in Operation Hailstone.
- The British cruiser Penelope was sunk off Naples by German submarine U-410 during the Battle of Anzio.
- German submarine U-406 was sunk in the North Atlantic by the Royal Navy frigate HMS Spey.
- German submarine U-7 sank west of Pillau in a probable malfunction during a dive.
- Died:
  - Wilhelm Stemmermann, 55, German General of Artillery (killed in action in Cherkasy)
  - Eric Fletcher Waters, 31, father of Roger Waters of Pink Floyd (killed in action in Anzio, Italy)

== February 19, 1944 (Saturday) ==
- 187 planes of the Luftwaffe bombed London as part of Operation Steinbock. It was the heaviest bombing of the British capital since May 1941.
- German submarine U-264 was depth charged and sunk in the Atlantic Ocean by two British sloops.
- German submarine U-386 was depth charged and sunk in the Atlantic Ocean by the British frigate Spey.

== February 20, 1944 (Sunday) ==
- The Allies launched "Big Week", a six-day strategic bombing campaign against the Third Reich.
- Erwin Rommel completed a four-day inspection tour of the Atlantic Wall. He reported to Adolf Hitler that the German coastal defenses were up to all requirements.
- The British destroyer Warwick was torpedoed and sunk in the Bristol Channel by German submarine U-413.
- The Norwegian steam powered railway ferry SF Hydro was sunk by Norwegian resistance fighters as part of the Norwegian heavy water sabotage campaign.
- Born: Willem van Hanegem, footballer, in Breskens, Netherlands

== February 21, 1944 (Monday) ==
- Soviet troops took Soltsy and Kholm.
- Churchill advised Stalin that the Polish government-in-exile was ready to accept the Curzon Line as a basis for talks and assured him that by the time they resumed diplomatic relations with the Soviets, their government would only consist of members willing to co-operate with Moscow. Stalin remained unconvinced.
- Hideki Tojo became Chief of Staff of the Japanese Army.
- Died: Ferenc Szisz, 70, Hungarian race car driver

== February 22, 1944 (Tuesday) ==
- In the Nikopol–Krivoi Rog Offensive, the Red Army captured Krivoy Rog itself when the Germans pulled out to avoid being encircled.
- Churchill gave a speech in the House of Commons aimed at dispelling Soviet distrust. Churchill said he supported the Soviet border demands in Poland as reasonable and stated that Britain had never guaranteed any Polish border.
- French poet and Resistance fighter Robert Desnos was arrested in Paris. He was sent to the Theresienstadt concentration camp and would die in June 1945 shortly after the camp's liberation.
- The British oil tanker British Chivalry was sunk by Japanese submarine I-37 in the Indian Ocean. I-37 circled the sinking ship indiscriminately shooting at the survivors, for which Lieutenant-Commander Nakagawa Hajime was tried and found guilty of a war crime in 1948.
- The U.S. Eighth Air Force was established.
- Born: Jonathan Demme, filmmaker, in Baldwin, Nassau County, New York (d. 2017); Tom Okker, tennis player, in Amsterdam, Netherlands

== February 23, 1944 (Wednesday) ==
- The Battle of Eniwetok ended in American victory when U.S. forces secured the last islands in the Eniwetok Atoll.
- The Battle of the Admin Box ended in Allied victory.
- Claiming they helped the Nazis, Stalin exiled the vast majority of the Chechen and the Ingush population in the Caucasus to the deserts of Siberia and Central Asia.
- Born: Johnny Winter, musician, in Beaumont, Texas (d. 2014)
- Died: Leo Baekeland, 80, Belgian-born American chemist

== February 24, 1944 (Thursday) ==
- The Battle of Arawe in the New Britain campaign ended in Allied victory.
- The Soviet 11th Army took Rogachev.
- Finnish Prime Minister Edwin Linkomies announced that his country was ready to make peace.
- German submarine U-257 was depth charged and sunk in the Atlantic Ocean by Allied warships.

== February 25, 1944 (Friday) ==
- Big Week concluded in Allied victory.
- The Japanese cargo ship Tango Maru was torpedoed and sunk in the Java Sea by the American submarine Rasher, killing 3,500 Japanese labourers and hundreds of Allied prisoners of war. Rasher sank the Japanese transport ship Ryūsei Maru that same day, killing some 5,000 Japanese soldiers.
- The British destroyer Inglefield was sunk by a German glide bomb off Anzio.
- The Founding of the Republic of Iceland took place after the Icelandic parliament decided to sever ties between Iceland and the Danish monarchy. The decision was put to a public referendum in May.
- Queen Wilhelmina of the Netherlands narrowly escaped death when her London home was destroyed by German bombing.
- Born: François Cevert, racing driver, in Paris, France (d. 1973)

== February 26, 1944 (Saturday) ==
- The Soviet 54th Army captured Porkhov.
- The Polish government-in-exile defied the British government's wishes and rejected the recognition of the Curzon Line as Poland's eastern frontier.
- Some 600 Soviet bombers raided Helsinki.
- German submarine U-91 was depth charged and sunk in the North Atlantic by three British warships.

== February 27, 1944 (Sunday) ==
- The Khaibakh massacre took place in Chechnya. Over 700 villagers considered "non-transportable" during Operation Lentil were burned alive or shot by Soviet forces.
- The U.S. Office of Strategic Services began Operation Ginny I with the objective of blowing up railway tunnels in Italy to cut German lines of communication, but the mission was aborted when the OSS team landed in the wrong place and could not locate the tunnel.
- The American submarine Grayback was sunk off Okinawa by Japanese aircraft.
- Born: Ken Grimwood, fantasy author, in Dothan, Alabama (d. 2003)

== February 28, 1944 (Monday) ==
- The first Narva Offensive ended in defensive German victory.
- The Huta Pieniacka massacre committed by Ukrainian collaborators of Nazi Germany in Huta Pieniacka in occupied Poland, with 500 to 1,200 Polish inhabitants murdered.
- The Wanaty massacre committed by German forces in Wanaty in occupied Poland, with 108 Polish inhabitants murdered, primarily women and children.
- The German 14th Army mounted new attacks against the U.S. VI Corps at Anzio.
- German aviator Hanna Reitsch visited Hitler in Berchtesgaden to receive a second Iron Cross. While there she suggested the creation of a squad of suicide bombers who could fly specially designed versions of the V-1 flying bomb, and volunteered to become one such suicide pilot herself. Hitler was not receptive to the idea, believing it to be an inefficient use of resources, but he would investigate the prospect of designing such aircraft.
- Born:
  - Dennis Farina, American actor, in Chicago, Illinois (d. 2013)
  - Sepp Maier, football goalkeeper, in Metten, Germany

== February 29, 1944 (Tuesday) ==
- The Admiralty Islands campaign began when U.S. forces landed on Los Negros Island.
- The American submarine USS Trout (SS-202) was depth charged and sunk in the East China Sea by Japanese destroyer Asashimo.
- The Nikopol–Krivoi Rog Offensive ended in Soviet victory.
- The Battle of Ist was fought in the Adriatic Sea between Free French destroyers and a Kriegsmarine force. The result was a Free French victory as two German ships were sunk and one torpedo boat severely damaged.
- The German cargo ship Kapitän Diederichsen, sailing from Pola to the Aegean Sea as part of a convoy and transporting coal, was attacked northwest of Premuda by two French light cruisers and eventually sunk; one crew member died, and five were wounded.
- Born: Robert Farber, American photographer
- Died: Pehr Evind Svinhufvud, 82, 3rd President of Finland
