= USS Buchanan (DD-484) =

Gleaves-class destroyer

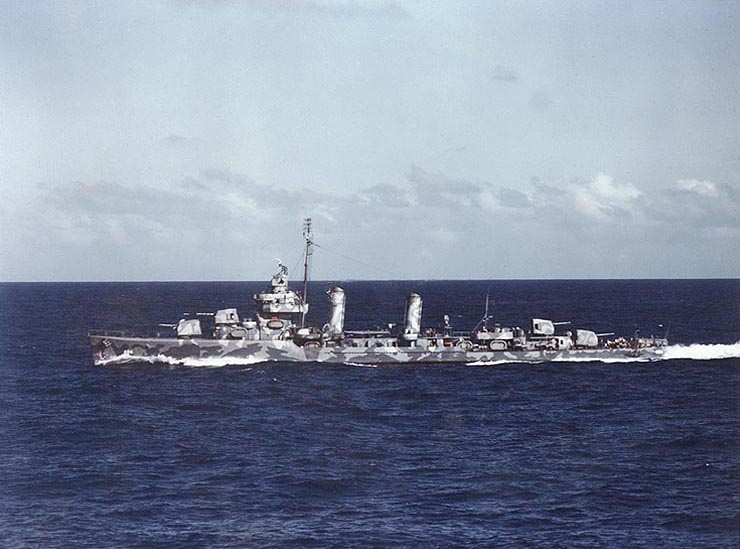
- USS Buchanan (DD-484)

History

United States
- Name: Buchanan
- Namesake: Franklin Buchanan
- Builder: Federal Shipbuilding and Drydock Company
- Laid down: 11 February 1941
- Launched: 22 November 1941
- Commissioned: 21 March 1942
- Decommissioned: 28 April 1948
- Fate: Transferred to Turkey, 28 April 1949
- Stricken: 7 June 1949

Turkey
- Name: Gelibolu
- Acquired: 28 April 1949
- Stricken: 1976
- Fate: Scrapped, 1976

General characteristics
- Class & type: Gleaves-class destroyer
- Displacement: 1,630 tons
- Length: 348 ft 3 in (106.15 m)
- Beam: 36 ft 1 in (11.00 m)
- Draft: 11 ft 10 in (3.61 m)
- Propulsion: 50,000 shp (37,000 kW); 4 boilers; 2 propellers
- Speed: 37.4 knots (69 km/h)
- Range: 6,500 nmi (12,000 km; 7,500 mi) at 12 kn (22 km/h; 14 mph)
- Complement: 16 officers, 260 enlisted
- Armament: 4 × 5 in (127 mm) DP guns, 6 × 0.5 in (12.7 mm) guns, 6 × 20 mm AA guns, 5 × 21 in (533 mm) torpedo tubes, 2 × depth charge tracks

USS Buchanan (DD-484) was a Gleaves-class destroyer, the second ship of the United States Navy to be named for Franklin Buchanan, who was an officer in the U.S. Navy who became an admiral in the Confederate Navy during the American Civil War.

Buchanan (DD-484) was launched on 22 November 1941 by Federal Shipbuilding and Dry Dock Co., Kearny, New Jersey; sponsored by Miss Hildreth Meiere, great-granddaughter of Admiral Buchanan. The ship was commissioned on 21 March 1942.

== Service history ==
Buchanan got underway for the Pacific 28 May 1942. She played an effective role in the landings at Guadalcanal and Tulagi (7–9 August) and on 9 August she was present during the Battle of Savo Island and rescued many survivors of the cruisers Astoria, Quincy, Vincennes, and HMAS Canberra, sunk during the battle. In September she escorted the aircraft carrier Wasp and other units to Nouméa, New Caledonia. Shortly thereafter, as part of TF 64.2, Buchanan assisted in the occupation of Funafuti Island in the Ellice Islands.

On the night of 11–12 October, as a unit of TG 64.2 Buchanan took part in the Battle of Cape Esperance. On 12 November the destroyer was damaged during the initial stages of the Naval Battle of Guadalcanal when she was accidentally hit by U.S. naval gunfire. She suffered the loss of five of her crew and had to withdraw from the action. After undergoing repairs, she was assigned to convoy escort duty until February 1943.

After leave in Sydney, Australia, Buchanan joined the screen of TF 15. On 30 April 1943, while screening in convoy, the ship ran aground off the southern coast of Guadalcanal and, after jettisoning heavy gear and ammunition, she was eased off the reef by three tugs. She proceeded to Espiritu Santo, New Hebrides, for repairs. Repairs completed, she participated in the New Georgia Group operations (30 June – 13 July) and while under heavy attack she effectively bombarded the enemy shore batteries during the invasion of Rendova. She participated in the bombardment of Munda (12 July) and the Battle of Kolombangara (13 July). Buchanan was damaged when she collided with the destroyer Woodworth during the latter engagement and retired to Nouméa for repairs. During the ensuing months, Buchanan convoyed ships to Nouméa, Espiritu Santo, and Guadalcanal. She participated in the Treasury-Bougainville operation (1–11 November), taking part in the Rabaul and Buka-Bonis strikes. Next, as a unit of TF 38, she bombarded Shortland Island and Bougainville (8 and 13 January 1944). On 22 January, while going to the rescue of the torpedoed oiler Cache, Buchanan hunted down and sank the Japanese submarine RO-37 in 11°47′S 164°17′E.

During February the destroyer participated in various phases of the Bismarck Archipelago operation (15 February – 1 March). She covered the Green Island landings and took an active part in the bombardment of Kavieng, Rabaul, and New Ireland before steaming to the United States to undergo a yard overhaul at Mare Island.

She participated in the Battle of Karavia

=== Invasion of the Philippines ===
Upon completion of overhaul and refresher training Buchanan returned to the Pacific and served with the transport screen during the assault and capture of the southern Palaus (6 September – 14 October 1944). She next participated in the strikes against Luzon between 14 and 16 December. On 18 December she was damaged by a typhoon in the Philippine Sea. Upon completion of repairs, she engaged in attacks on Luzon, Formosa, and the China coast (6–16 January 1945) in support of the Luzon operation. During the remainder of World War II she participated in the Iwo Jima invasion (15 February – 5 March), Okinawa operation and supporting 3rd and 5th Fleet raids (16 March – 30 June); as well as the 3rd Fleet operations against Japan (10 July – 15 August 1945).

=== End of World War II ===
On 29 August she entered Tokyo Bay escorting the battleship South Dakota. On 1 September she carried Fleet Admirals Nimitz and Halsey from their respective flagships to Yokohama where they met with General MacArthur and then returned them to the fleet. The following day she carried General MacArthur to the battleship Missouri where he accepted the Japanese surrender and then returned him to Yokohama. She remained on occupation duty in the Far East until 8 October and then departed for San Francisco where she arrived 20 October. Buchanan steamed to Charleston, South Carolina for pre-inactivation overhaul and went out of commission in reserve there 21 May 1946.

Buchanan received the Presidential Unit Citation and 16 battle stars for her World War II service, placing her among the most decorated US Naval vessels of World War II.

=== TCG Gelibolu (D-346) ===
Buchanan was recommissioned 11 December 1948 at Charleston and underwent shakedown and refresher training with a nucleus Turkish crew aboard. On 29 March 1949, she got underway for Gölcük, Turkey, where she was turned over to the Turkish Navy on 28 April 1949.

The destroyer served in the Turkish Navy as TCG Gelibolu (D-346) until retired in 1976.
