= Ro-37 =

Ro-37 may refer to:

- IMAM Ro.37, an Italian reconnaissance biplane of 1934
- Japanese submarine Ro-37, an Imperial Japanese Navy submarine commissioned in June 1943 and sunk in January 1944
