= January 1944 =

Month of 1944

<<	January 1944					>>
Su	Mo	Tu	We	Th	Fr	Sa
						1
2	3	4	5	6	7	8
9	10	11	12	13	14	15
16	17	18	19	20	21	22
23	24	25	26	27	28	29
30	31

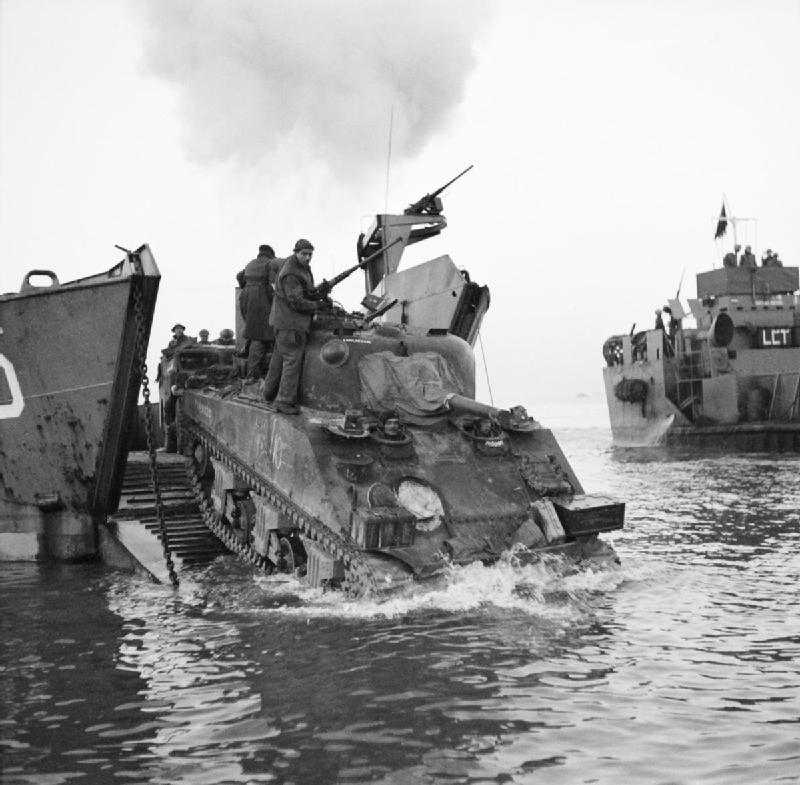
January 22, 1944: Allied troops begin amphibious invasion of Italy at Battle of Anzio.

The following events occurred in January 1944:

== January 1, 1944 (Saturday) ==
- The Syrian Republic was recognized as independent.
- RAF Bomber Command sent 421 aircraft to attack Berlin overnight.
- USC Trojans beat the Washington Huskies 29-0 in the Rose Bowl.
- The Georgia Tech Yellow Jackets defeated Tulsa Golden Hurricane 20-18 in the Sugar Bowl.
- LSU Tigers beat the Texas A&M Aggies 19-14 in the Orange Bowl.
- The Cotton Bowl Classic ended in a 7–7 tie between the Randolph Field Ramblers and the Texas Longhorns.
- Born: Omar al-Bashir, 7th President of Sudan, in Hosh Bannaga, Sudan; Jimmy Hart, professional wrestling manager, executive and musician, in Jackson, Mississippi; Robert Lee Minor, stunt performer and actor, in Birmingham, Alabama
- Died: Edwin Lutyens, 74, British architect; Charles Turner, 81, Australian cricketer

== January 2, 1944 (Sunday) ==
- The Allied Landing at Saidor began on Papua New Guinea during Operation Dexterity.
- The Red Army captured Radovel northwest of Korosten and came within 18 miles of the pre-war Polish border.
- A Tree Grows in Brooklyn by Betty Smith topped the New York Times Fiction Best Sellers list.
- Born: Prince Norodom Ranariddh, politician and law academic, in Phnom Penh, Cambodia (d. 2021)

== January 3, 1944 (Monday) ==
- The Soviets took Olevsk, 10 miles (16 km) from the pre-war Polish frontier.
- The Reich Chancellery in Berlin was hit during an RAF raid.
- The American destroyer USS Turner (DD-648) sank off the Ambrose Light in New York after suffering a series of onboard explosions. 138 of 256 crew perished.
- William Tubman took office as 19th President of Liberia, a position he would hold until 1971.
- Born: Chris von Saltza, Olympic swimming gold medalist, in San Francisco, California

== January 4, 1944 (Tuesday) ==
- The Soviet 27th Army took Bila Tserkva southwest of Kiev.
- The Soviet 1st Ukrainian Front pushed Erich von Manstein's Army Group South back beyond the pre-war Polish border at Sarny.
- The U.S. Fifth Army attacked the southern end of the Gustav Line along a 10-mile (16 km) front.
- Argentina became the first country to recognize the military junta of Gualberto Villarroel in Bolivia.
- German radio publicized a decree to mobilize school children for war purposes.
- A tugboat on the Hudson River dislodged a barge carrying flour owned by the government of the United States. This incident was litigated in United States v. Carroll Towing Co., a famous case that established the Hand formula.
- Died: Kaj Munk, 45, Danish playwright and Lutheran pastor (murdered by the Gestapo)

== January 5, 1944 (Wednesday) ==
- During the Zhitomir–Berdichev Offensive, the Soviets announced the capture of Berdychiv itself.
- With Red Army forces about to cross the Polish border, the Polish government-in-exile issued a declaration describing itself as "the only and legal steward and spokesman of the Polish Nation" and calling for the Soviet Union to respect the rights and interests of Poland. The statement also proposed the re-establishment of a liberated republic in Poland as quickly as possible as well as the negotiation of an agreement between the Polish government-in-exile and the Soviet Union that would permit the co-ordination of Polish resistance actions with the Red Army.

== January 6, 1944 (Thursday) ==
- Soviet forces crossed the pre-war Polish border and captured the town of Rokitno.
- Britain and the U.S. announced that a jet-propelled aircraft would soon be in production.
- Born: Bonnie Franklin, actress, in Santa Monica, California (d. 2013); Alan Stivell, Celtic folk and rock musician, in Riom, France; Rolf M. Zinkernagel, professor of immunology and Nobel Laureate, in Riehen, Switzerland
- Died: Ida Tarbell, 86, American teacher, author and journalist

== January 7, 1944 (Friday) ==
- The Red Army took Klesov near Rovno.
- The U.S. Fifth Army took San Vittore del Lazio on the Bernhardt Line.
- Died: Lou Henry Hoover, 69, First Lady of the United States from 1929 to 1933

== January 8, 1944 (Saturday) ==
- The Russians took Kirovohrad.
- The Verona trial began in the Italian Social Republic. Six leading members of the Grand Council of Fascism were put on trial for voting in favour of Benito Mussolini's removal from power during the events of 25 Luglio.
- German submarine U-426 was sunk in the Bay of Biscay by a Short Sunderland patrol bomber aircraft of No. 10 Squadron RAAF.
- German submarine U-757 was depth charged and sunk in the North Atlantic by the British destroyer Bayntun and the Canadian corvette Camrose.

== January 9, 1944 (Sunday) ==
- The Soviets took Polonne and Kamianets-Podilskyi.
- German submarine U-81 was bombed and sunk at Pola, Italy by American aircraft.
- Born: Ian Hornak, painter and draughtsman, in Philadelphia, Pennsylvania (d. 2002); Jimmy Page, guitarist, songwriter, record producer and founder of Led Zeppelin, in Heston, Greater London, England

== January 10, 1944 (Monday) ==
- The Verona Trial ended with five death sentences. Tullio Cianetti was the only defendant spared from execution, in light of his having written a letter of apology to Mussolini. He was given a 30-year prison term instead.
- The Russians took Lyudvipol, 12 miles (19 km) inside the 1939 Polish border.
- British troops took Maungdaw in western Burma.
- Born: William Sanderson, American actor, in Memphis, Tennessee
- Died: William Emerson Ritter, 87, American biologist

== January 11, 1944 (Tuesday) ==
- Action of 11 January 1944: The Japanese cruiser Kuma was torpedoed and sunk off Penang, Malaya by the British submarine Tally-Ho.
- U.S. President Franklin D. Roosevelt made the annual State of the Union Address to Congress, in which he proposed the Second Bill of Rights guaranteeing such things as housing, medical care and education.
- The Soviet Union responded to the Polish declaration of January 5 with a statement through TASS. The Soviet government disputed Polish territorial claims and insisted that the Soviet-Polish border had been determined through "the plebiscite carried out in 1939 on a broad democratic basis". The statement also accused the Polish government-in-exile of being "incapable of establishing friendly relations with the USSR, and has also shown itself incapable of organizing active resistance against German invaders inside Poland. Moreover, by its erroneous policy it has often played into the hands of German invaders."
- The P-51 Mustang joined the P-38 Lightning and P-47 Thunderbolt in U.S. long-range escort missions over Germany.
- The Alfred Hitchcock-directed drama thriller film Lifeboat starring Tallulah Bankhead and William Bendix was released.
- The Moroccan Nationalist Movement released the Proclamation of Independence, a manifesto demanding full independence from France, Spain, and the international legislative body governing Tangier; national reunification; and a democratic constitution.
- Died:
  - Emilio De Bono, 77, Italian general and member of the Fascist Grand Council (executed)
  - Galeazzo Ciano, 40, Foreign Minister of Italy from 1936 to 1943 and son-in-law of Benito Mussolini (executed)
  - Charles King, 57, American actor
  - Giovanni Marinelli, 64, Italian Fascist leader (executed)
  - Edgard Potier, 40, Belgian air force officer (suicide after being tortured by the Germans)

== January 12, 1944 (Wednesday) ==
- The U.S. 34th Infantry Division in Italy took Cervaro.
- The Soviet 13th Army took Sarny.
- Winston Churchill and Charles de Gaulle began a two-day conference in Marrakesh, Morocco centered on the co-operation of a French expeditionary force in the Allied invasion of Europe and the administration of France after the invasion.
- Born: Joe Frazier, boxing champion, in Beaufort, South Carolina (d. 2011)

== January 13, 1944 (Thursday) ==
- The Soviet 1st Ukrainian Front captured Korets.
- German submarine U-231 was bombed and sunk in the Atlantic Ocean northeast of the Azores by a Vickers Wellington bomber of No. 172 Squadron RAF.
- The director of the United States Typhus Commission warned that Naples faced a serious threat "and the menace can be expected to extend to Southern Italy. No cases have yet been reported among the military forces, but the growing typhus rate is a potential menace to the Allied military effort."

== January 14, 1944 (Friday) ==
- In the northern sector of the Eastern Front, the Soviets began the Leningrad–Novgorod Offensive (the first of Stalin's ten blows) and the Krasnoye Selo–Ropsha Offensive
- The Japanese destroyer Sazanami was torpedoed and sunk southeast of Yap by the submarine USS Albacore.
- The Polish government-in-exile reiterated its refusal to accept unilateral decisions made about Polish territory, but said it was approaching the British and U.S. governments to mediate "all outstanding questions, the settlement of which should lead to friendly and permanent co-operation between Poland and the Soviet Union. The Polish Government believes this to be desirable in the interest of the victory of the United Nations and harmonious relations in post-war Europe."
- The adventure film Ali Baba and the Forty Thieves starring Jon Hall and Maria Montez was released.

== January 15, 1944 (Saturday) ==
- The San Juan earthquake devastated the province of San Juan in Argentina. Some 10,000 people were killed and one-third of the province's population was left homeless.
- The U.S. II Corps in Italy captured Monte Trecchio.
- German submarine U-377 made her last radio report before being lost in the Atlantic Ocean to an unknown cause, possibly sunk by the British destroyer Wanderer and frigate Glenarm on January 17.

== January 16, 1944 (Sunday) ==
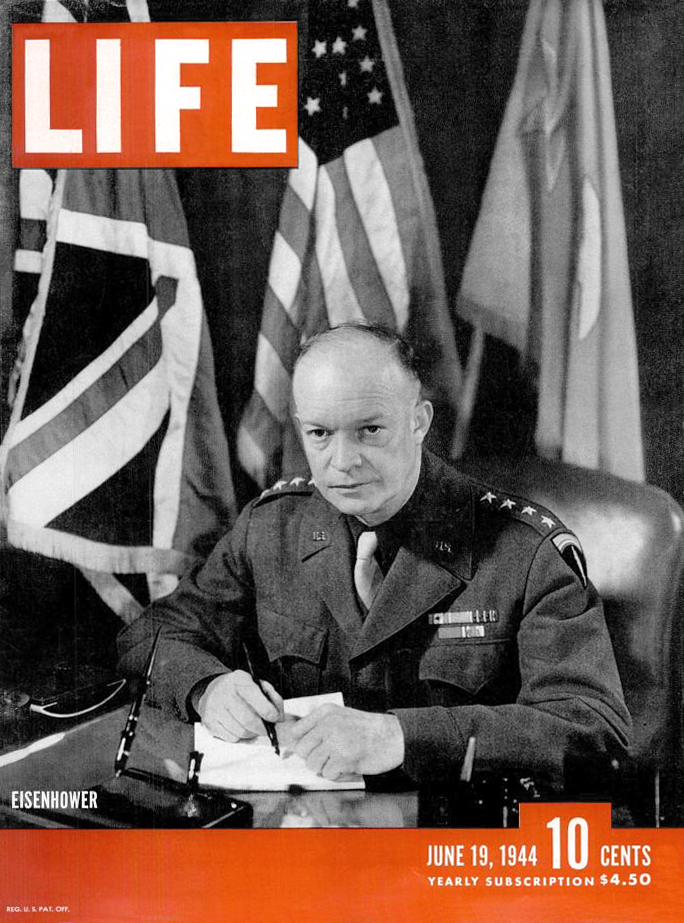
U.S. Army General and AEF Commander Eisenhower

- Dwight D. Eisenhower formally assumed the duties of the Commander in Chief of the Allied Expeditionary Forces.
- Japanese submarine I-181 ran aground and was wrecked on Gneisenau Point at Kelanoa Harbour, New Guinea.
- German submarine U-544 was sunk in the Atlantic Ocean by rockets and depth charges from Grumman TBF Avenger planes from the escort carrier USS Guadalcanal.

== January 17, 1944 (Monday) ==
- The Battle of Monte Cassino began in Italy.
- Three divisions of the British X Corps launched an attack across the Garigliano. The river was crossed on the left flank but the Germans held fast on the right.
- German submarine U-305 sank in the Atlantic Ocean from an unknown cause.
- The Soviet Union rejected Poland's proposal for negotiation over the Polish frontier.
- A diplomatic incident occurred when the Soviet newspaper Pravda published a report claiming that representatives of Britain and Germany had met somewhere on the Iberian Peninsula to discuss making a separate peace. The British Foreign Office swiftly denied the rumor in an official message sent to the Soviet government.
- Meat rationing was introduced in Australia.
- Born:
  - Jan Guillou, author and journalist, in Södertälje, Sweden
  - Françoise Hardy, singer and actress, in Paris, France (d. 2024)

== January 18, 1944 (Tuesday) ==
- The Soviets broke the Siege of Leningrad by opening a narrow corridor south of Lake Ladoga.
- The British 5th and 56th Divisions established themselves on the north bank of the Garigliano.
- The German 3rd Panzer Army repulsed a Soviet attack at Vitebsk.
- Kenneth Anderson was relieved of command of the British Second Army. He would be replaced by Miles Dempsey.
- Born: Paul Keating, 24th Prime Minister of Australia, in Paddington, New South Wales, Australia

== January 19, 1944 (Wednesday) ==
- British bombers conducted their heaviest raid on Berlin yet, dropping 2,300 tons of bombs in just over half an hour.
- German submarine U-641 was depth charged and sunk in the Atlantic Ocean by the British corvette Violet.
- Born: Shelley Fabares, actress and singer, in Santa Monica, California
- Died: Harold Fraser-Simson, 71, English composer

== January 20, 1944 (Thursday) ==
- The Battle of Rapido River began on the Italian front.
- German submarine U-263 struck a mine and sank in the Bay of Biscay.
- Winston Churchill met with representatives of the Polish government-in-exile in an effort to break the diplomatic impasse with the Soviets. Churchill pressed the Poles to accept the Curzon Line as a basis for discussion, explaining that the Soviets' need for security as well as their enormous battlefield sacrifices to liberate Poland from the Germans entitled them to ask for revision of Polish frontiers. Churchill promised in return to challenge Moscow's demand for changes in the Polish government.
- Died: James McKeen Cattell, 83, American psychologist

== January 21, 1944 (Friday) ==
- The Soviet 8th Army took Mga in Leningrad Oblast.
- The Luftwaffe began Operation Steinbock, a night-time strategic bombing campaign against southern England. On the first day, only 96 of 270 German aircraft reached their targets and some were shot down.
- 648 aircraft of the RAF were sent to bomb Magdeburg overnight.
- Australia and New Zealand signed the Canberra Pact, a treaty of mutual defense.
- The Japanese put down the Jesselton Revolt in Borneo.
- The Anzio landing force sailed from Naples.

== January 22, 1944 (Saturday) ==
- The Battle of Anzio began with an Allied amphibious landing in the region of Anzio and Nettuno, with the objective of outflanking German forces at the Winter Line and setting up a drive on Rome.
- The Battle of Rapido River ended in German defensive victory.
- Walter Model replaced Georg von Küchler as commander of Army Group North.
- President Roosevelt issued Executive Order 9417, creating the War Refugee Board to aid civilian victims of the Axis powers.

== January 23, 1944 (Sunday) ==
- The British destroyer Janus was sunk off Anzio by a Fritz X glide bomb.
- During the Finisterre Range campaign, Australian forces in the Ramu valley advanced up the Finisterre Range toward Shaggy Ridge, taking Maukiryo.
- The Detroit Red Wings recorded the most lopsided win in National Hockey League history when they blew out the New York Rangers 15-0.
- Born: Rutger Hauer, actor, in Breukelen, Netherlands (d. 2019)
- Died: Edvard Munch, 80, Norwegian painter and printmaker

== January 24, 1944 (Monday) ==
- The Battle of the Korsun–Cherkassy Pocket began on the Eastern Front.
- The British hospital ship St David was bombed and sunk off Anzio despite being well-marked and lit in accordance with laws of war. 96 perished of the 229 aboard.
- Born: Klaus Nomi, singer, in Immenstadt, Germany (d. 1983)

== January 25, 1944 (Tuesday) ==
- Japanese destroyer Suzukaze was torpedoed and sunk northwest of Ponape by the American submarine Skipjack.
- Australian forces in New Guinea captured Shaggy Ridge.
- Born: Sally Beauman, journalist and writer, in Totnes, Devon, England (d. 2016)

== January 26, 1944 (Wednesday) ==
- Argentina bowed to pressure from the United States and severed diplomatic relations with the Axis powers.
- Soviet forces captured Krasnogvardeisk near Leningrad. Two days later the city's pre-1923 name of Gatchina would be restored.
- The U.S. II Corps in Italy established a bridgehead over the Rapido.
- Born: Angela Davis, political activist, scholar and author, in Birmingham, Alabama;

== January 27, 1944 (Thursday) ==
- The Red Army lifted the Siege of Leningrad after 2 years, 4 months, 2 weeks and 5 days.
- Nearly 500 Allied bombers raided Berlin in very bad weather. The greatest threat was not anti-aircraft fire or the Luftwaffe which did not show up, but the danger of collisions in poor visibility.
- Liberia declared war on Germany and Japan.
- Born: Peter Akinola, Anglican Primate of the Church of Nigeria, in Abeokuta, Nigeria; Mairead Maguire, peace activist and recipient of the 1976 Nobel Peace Prize, in Belfast, Northern Ireland; Nick Mason, drummer (Pink Floyd), in Edgbaston, England

== January 28, 1944 (Friday) ==
- German submarines U-271 and U-571 were both sunk in the Atlantic Ocean west of Ireland by Allied aircraft.
- A British telegram to Joseph Stalin warned that "the creation in Warsaw of another government other than that now recognized, as well as disturbances in Poland, would confront Great Britain and the United States with a problem, which would preclude agreement among the great powers."
- Omar Bradley took command of the First United States Army.
- Born: Susan Howard, actress, writer and political activist, in Marshall, Texas; John Tavener, composer, in Wembley, London, England (d. 2013)

== January 29, 1944 (Saturday) ==
- Soviet forces captured Chudovo.
- The Battle of the Green Islands began when American and New Zealand forces invaded the Green Islands between Bougainville and New Ireland.
- Koniuchy massacre: A unit of Soviet partisans accompanied by Jewish partisans killed at least 38 civilians in the village of Koniuchy in Nazi occupied Lithuania.
- The British cruiser Spartan was sunk off Anzio by a Henschel Hs 293 glide bomb.
- German submarine U-364 was depth charged and sunk in the Bay of Biscay by a Handley Page Halifax bomber of No. 502 Squadron RAF.
- Born:
  - Susana Giménez, model, talk show host and businesswoman, in Buenos Aires, Argentina;
  - Patrick Lipton Robinson, Judge in the International Court of Justice, in Jamaica
- Died: William Allen White, 75, American newspaper editor, politician and progressivist leader

== January 30, 1944 (Sunday) ==
- The Krasnoye Selo–Ropsha Offensive ended in Soviet victory.
- The Soviets began the Nikopol–Krivoi Rog Offensive.
- The Battle of Cisterna began as part of the larger Battle of Anzio.
- At Anzio, the British 5th Division of 10th Corps broke through the Gustav Line and captured Monte Natal.
- British destroyer Hardy was crippled in the Arctic Sea by a torpedo from German submarine U-278 and had to be scrapped.
- German submarine U-314 was depth charged and sunk in the Norwegian Sea by British destroyers Meteor and Whitehall.
- Adolf Hitler made a radio address from his headquarters on the eleventh anniversary of the Nazis coming to power. He spent little time talking about the war situation and mostly spoke about Germany being Europe's only bulwark against communism.
- The Brazzaville Conference opened in Brazzaville, the capital of French Equatorial Africa.

== January 31, 1944 (Monday) ==
- German submarine U-592 was depth charged and sunk southwest of Ireland by three British sloops; none of the crew survived.
- The Battle of Kwajalein began on Kwajalein Atoll in the Marshall Islands.
- Allied troops occupied Majuro in the Marshall Islands.
- Born:
  - Connie Booth, actress and writer, in Indianapolis, Indiana
  - Ivo Opstelten, politician, in Rotterdam, Netherlands
- Died: Jean Giradoux, 61, French writer and diplomat
