= USS Flier =

Gato-class submarine of the United States Navy

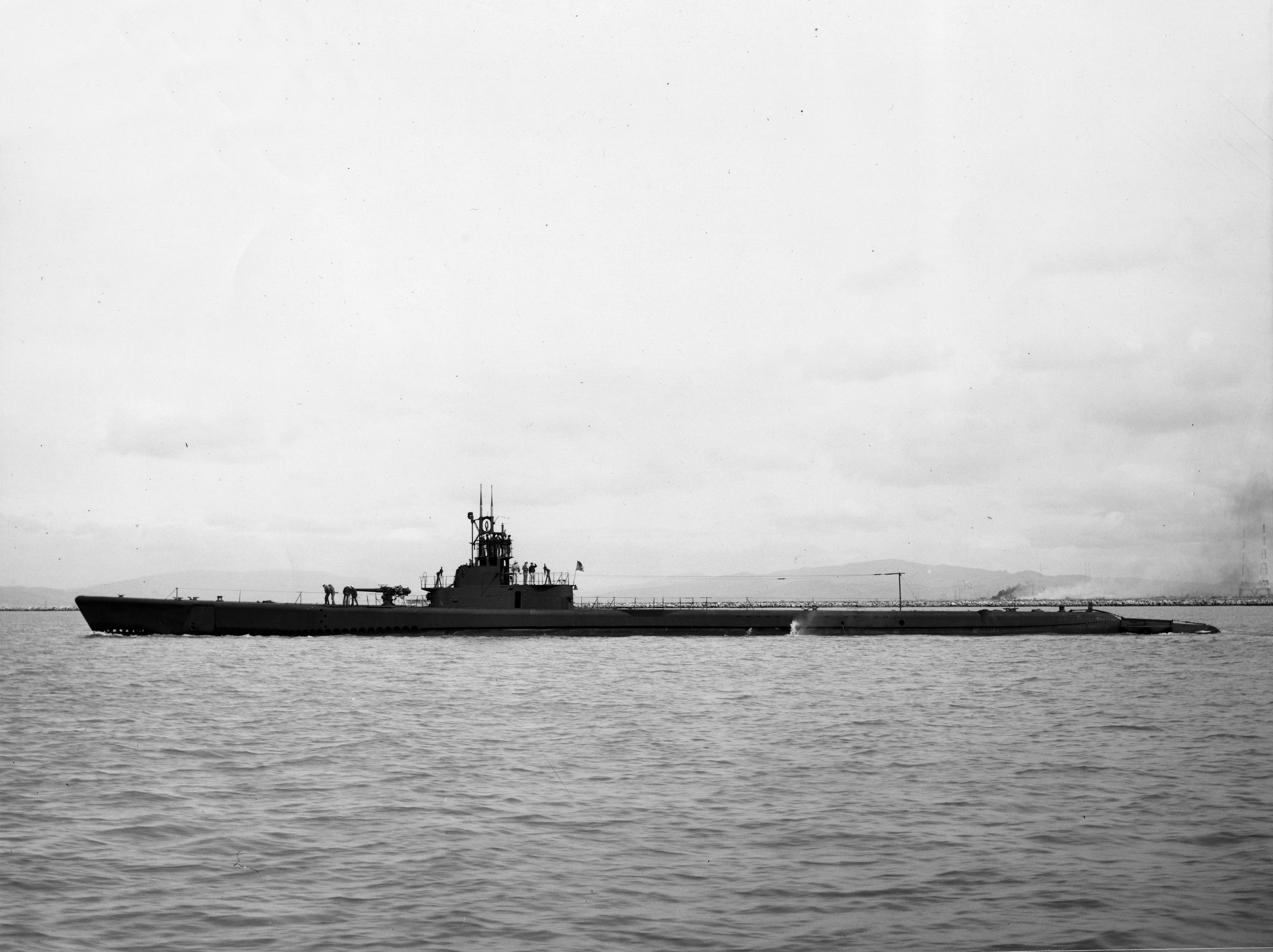
- USS Flier (SS-250) off the Mare Island Navy Yard in California on 20 April 1944.

History

United States
- Name: USS Flier (SS-250)
- Namesake: Flier
- Builder: Electric Boat Company, Groton, Connecticut
- Laid down: 30 October 1942
- Launched: 11 July 1943
- Sponsored by: Mrs. A. S. Pierce
- Commissioned: 18 October 1943
- Fate: Mined in the Balabac Strait, 13 August 1944

General characteristics
- Class & type: Gato-class diesel-electric submarine
- Displacement: 1,525 long tons (1,549 t) surfaced; 2,424 long tons (2,463 t) submerged
- Length: 311 ft 9 in (95.02 m)
- Beam: 27 ft 3 in (8.31 m)
- Draft: 17 ft (5.2 m) maximum
- Propulsion: 4 × General Motors Model 16-248 V16 Diesel engines driving electric generators; 2 × 126-cell Sargo batteries; 4 × high-speed General Electric electric motors with reduction gears; two propellers; 5,400 shp (4.0 MW) surfaced; 2,740 shp (2.0 MW) submerged
- Speed: 21 kn (39 km/h) surfaced; 9 kn (17 km/h) submerged
- Range: 11,000 nmi (20,000 km) surfaced at 10 kn (19 km/h)
- Endurance: 48 hours at 2 kn (4 km/h) submerged; 75 days on patrol
- Test depth: 300 ft (90 m)
- Complement: 6 officers, 54 enlisted
- Armament: 10 × 21-inch (533 mm) torpedo tubes; 6 forward, 4 aft; 24 torpedoes; 1 × 3-inch (76 mm) / 50 caliber deck gun; Bofors 40 mm and Oerlikon 20 mm cannon

USS Flier (SS-250) was a Gato-class submarine. It was the only ship of the United States Navy to be named for the flier: a freshwater fish from the American south.

== Construction and commissioning ==
Flier′s keel was laid down 30 October 1942 by Electric Boat Company of Groton, Connecticut. She was launched on 11 July 1943, sponsored by Mrs. A. S. Pierce, and commissioned on 18 October 1943.

== October 1943–May 1944 ==
After shakedown training, Flier departed New London, Connecticut, in early December 1943 bound for the Panama Canal. While she was on the surface in the Caribbean Sea nearing the approaches to the canal, an Alied merchant ship mistook her for a German U-boat and opened gunfire on her, firing 13 rounds, but she escaped into a rain squall without suffering damage or casualties. After transiting the Panama Canal, she reached Pearl Harbor, Hawaii, on 20 December 1943 and prepared for her first war patrol.

Flier departed Pearl Harbor for her first war patrol on 12 January 1944 but ran aground near Midway Atoll in the Northwestern Hawaiian Islands on 16 January 1944. USS Macaw (ASR-11), a Chanticleer-class submarine rescue ship, attempted to pull Flier free but ran aground herself and sank. Flier eventually was saved by the submarine rescue ship USS Florikan (ASR-9) and towed to first Pearl Harbor and then the Mare Island Navy Yard at Mare Island, California, for repairs.

== First war patrol ==
On 21 May 1944, Flier again departed for her first war patrol, heading for a patrol area in the South China Sea west of Luzon in the Philippines. She made her first contact on 4 June 1944, attacking a well-escorted Japanese convoy of five merchant ships. Firing three torpedoes at each of two ships, she sent the 10,380-gross register ton transport Hakusan Maru to the bottom and scored a hit on another ship before clearing the area to evade counterattack.

On 13 June 1944, Flier attacked a Japanese convoy of 11 ships — cargo ships and tankers — guarded by at least six escorts. The alert behavior of the escorts during the attack resulted in a severe counterattack on Flier before she could observe what damage she had done to the convoy. On 22 June 1944, she began a long chase after another large convoy, scoring four hits for six torpedoes fired at two cargo ships that day, and three hits for four torpedoes launched against another cargo ship of the same convoy the next day. Flier put into Fremantle submarine base at Fremantle, Western Australia, on 5 July 1944 and began a refit.

== Second war patrol ==
With her refit complete, Flier departed Fremantle on 2 August 1944 on her second war patrol, bound for a patrol area in the South China Sea off the coast of Japanese-occupied French Indochina via the Lombok Strait, Macassar Strait, and Balabac Strait. At about 22:00 on 12 August, while transiting the Balabac Strait on the surface, she struck a naval mine. She sank in about a minute, but 15 officers and men were able to clamber out. Eight of them reached the beach of Byan Island after 17 hours in the water. Philippine guerrillas guided them to a coastwatcher, who arranged for them to be picked up by submarine, and on the night of 30–31 August 1944 they were taken aboard the submarine USS Redfin (SS-272).

== Honors and awards ==
- Asiatic-Pacific Campaign Medal with one battle star for World War II service

Flier's single completed war patrol was designated "successful." She is credited with having sunk 10,380 gross register tons of Japanese shipping.

== Wreck ==
On 1 February 2009, the U.S. Navy announced the discovery of Flier near the Balabac Strait in the Philippines at 7°58′43.21″N 117°15′23.79″E. The discovery of a Gato-class submarine was made during an expedition by YAP Films, based in part on information provided by a survivor of the sinking of Flier. Further research by the Naval History and Heritage Command revealed that no other submarine, American or Japanese, had been reported lost in that general vicinity. In addition, footage of the wreck showed a gun mount and radar antenna, both of which were similar to the same equipment seen in contemporary photographs of Flier. The ship rests in 330 ft (100 m) of water.

== See also ==
- List of U.S. Navy losses in World War II
