= Japanese submarine Ro-37 =

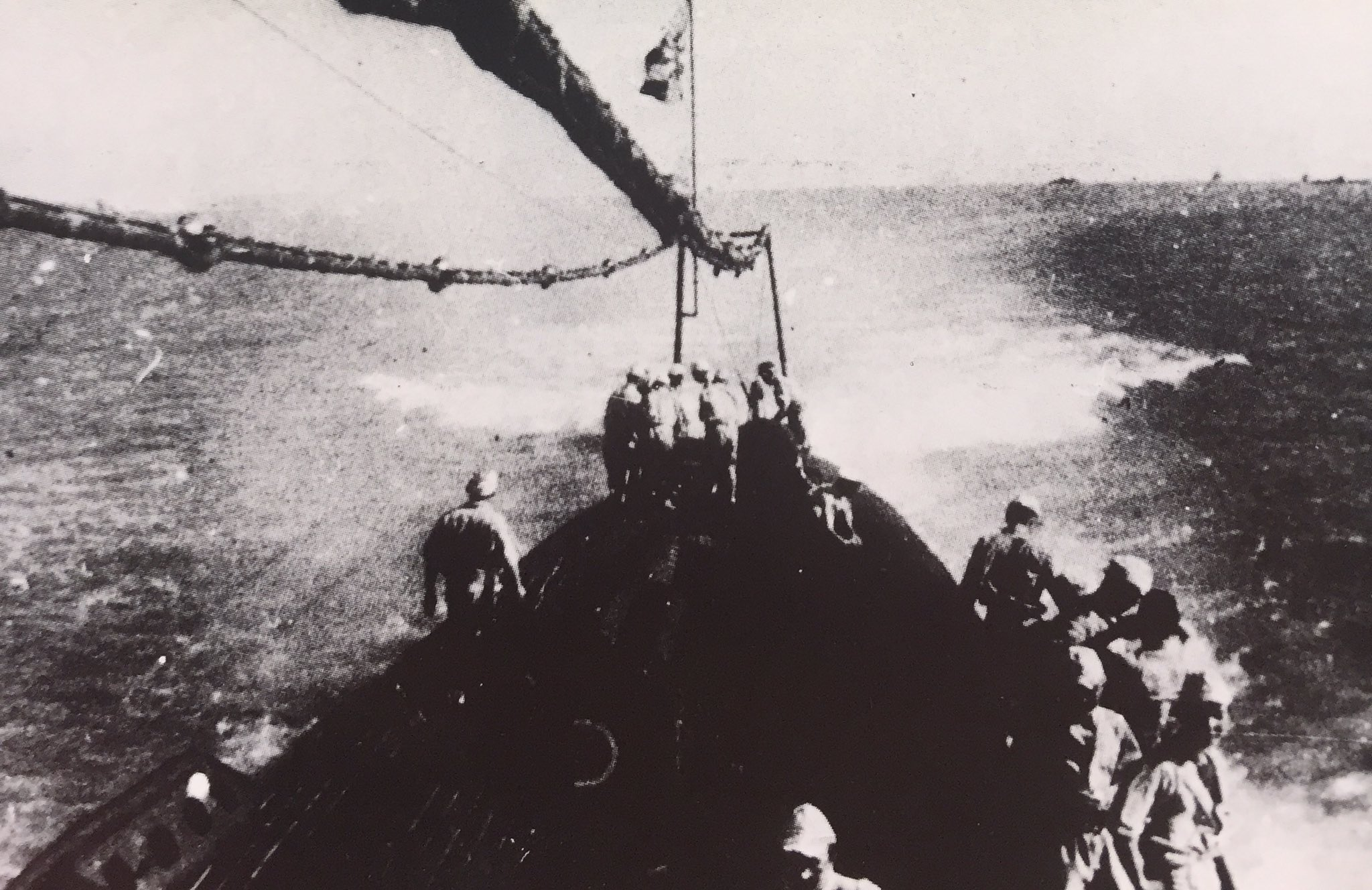
- The stern of Ro-37 while underway

History

Japan
- Name: Submarine No. 203
- Builder: Sasebo Naval Arsenal, Sasebo, Japan
- Laid down: 9 October 1941
- Renamed: Ro-36 on 20 June 1942
- Launched: 30 June 1942
- Completed: 30 June 1943
- Commissioned: 30 June 1943
- Fate: Sunk 22 January 1944
- Stricken: 30 April 1944

General characteristics
- Class & type: Kaichū type submarine (K6 subclass)
- Displacement: 1,133 tonnes (1,115 long tons) surfaced; 1,470 tonnes (1,447 long tons) submerged
- Length: 80.5 m (264 ft 1 in) overall
- Beam: 7 m (23 ft 0 in)
- Draft: 4.07 m (13 ft 4 in)
- Installed power: 4,200 bhp (3,100 kW) (diesel); 1,200 hp (890 kW) (electric motor)
- Propulsion: Diesel-electric; 1 × diesel engine; 1 × electric motor
- Speed: 19.75 knots (36.58 km/h; 22.73 mph) surfaced; 8 knots (15 km/h; 9.2 mph) submerged
- Range: 5,000 nmi (9,300 km; 5,800 mi) at 16 knots (30 km/h; 18 mph) surfaced; 45 nmi (83 km; 52 mi) at 5 knots (9.3 km/h; 5.8 mph) submerged
- Test depth: 80 m (260 ft)
- Crew: 61
- Armament: 4 × bow 533 mm (21 in) torpedo tubes; 1 × 76.2 mm (3.00 in) L/40 anti-aircraft gun; 2 × single 25 mm (1.0 in) AA guns

Ro-37 was an Imperial Japanese Navy Kaichū type submarine of the K6 sub-class. Completed and commissioned in June 1943, she served in World War II and was sunk during her second war patrol in January 1944.

== Design and description ==
The submarines of the K6 sub-class were versions of the preceding K5 sub-class with greater range and diving depth. They displaced 1,133 tonnes (1,115 long tons) surfaced and 1,470 tonnes (1,447 long tons) submerged. The submarines were 80.5 meters (264 ft 1 in) long, had a beam of 7 meters (23 ft 0 in) and a draft of 4.07 meters (13 ft 4 in). They had a diving depth of 80 meters (260 ft).

For surface running, the boats were powered by two 2,100-brake-horsepower (1,566 kW) diesel engines, each driving one propeller shaft. When submerged each propeller was driven by a 600-horsepower (447 kW) electric motor. They could reach 19.75 knots (36.58 km/h; 22.73 mph) on the surface and 8 knots (15 km/h; 9.2 mph) underwater. On the surface, the K6s had a range of 11,000 nautical miles (20,000 km; 13,000 mi) at 12 knots (22 km/h; 14 mph); submerged, they had a range of 45 nmi (83 km; 52 mi) at 5 knots (9.3 km/h; 5.8 mph).

The boats were armed with four internal bow 53.3 cm (21.0 in) torpedo tubes and carried a total of ten torpedoes. They were also armed with a single 76.2 mm (3.00 in) L/40 anti-aircraft gun and two single 25 mm (1.0 in) AA guns.

== Construction and commissioning ==
Ro-37 was laid down as Submarine No. 203 on 9 October 1941 by the Sasebo Navy Yard at Sasebo, Japan. She was renamed Ro-37 on 20 June 1942, and was provisionally attached to the Maizuru Naval District that day. She was launched on 30 June 1942 and completed and commissioned a year later on 30 June 1943.

== Service history ==
Upon commissioning, Ro-37 was attached formally to the Maizuru Naval District and assigned to Submarine Squadron 11 for workups. On 16 September 1943 she was reassigned directly to 6th Fleet headquarters, and she departed Maizuru bound for Truk on 22 September 1943. During her voyage, she was reassigned to Submarine Division 1 in the 6th Fleet on 24 September 1943. She arrived at Truk on 7 October 1943.

=== First war patrol ===
Ro-37 got underway from Truk on 20 October 1943 to begin her first war patrol, assigned a patrol area east of the New Hebrides as part of Submarine Group A. While at sea, she was reassigned to Submarine Division 34 on 31 October 1943, but otherwise her patrol was uneventful. She returned to Truk in November 1943.

=== Second war patrol ===
During the second half of December 1943, Ro-37 took aboard supplies from the auxiliary submarine tender Heian Maru at Truk. On 2 January 1944, Fleet Radio Unit, Melbourne (FRUMEL), an Allied signals intelligence unit headquartered at Melbourne, Australia, reported that a Japanese message transmitted from Truk that FRUMEL had intercepted and decrypted said that Ro-37 was scheduled to depart Truk Lagoon via the South Channel at 16:00 on 3 January 1944 and proceed east-southeast on a course of 116 degrees. As FRUMEL had reported, Ro-37 got underway from Truk on 3 January 1944 on her second war patrol, bound for a patrol area off the New Hebrides. The Japanese never heard from her again.

=== Loss ===
Ro-37 was 155 nautical miles (287 km; 178 mi) southeast of San Cristobal in the Solomon Islands on 22 January 1944 when she sighted the United States Navy fleet oiler USS Cache (AO-67), which was on a voyage to Espiritu Santo in the New Hebrides in company with the destroyer minesweeper USS Southard (DMS-10). She hit Cache in the port side with one torpedo at 12°08′S 164°23′E. The explosion opened holes in three of Cache′s oil tanks, damaged other tanks, and blew two men overboard, killing one of them. Southard rescued the other man from the water.

Meanwhile, Cache transmitted a distress signal, which the destroyer USS Buchanan (DD-484) — which was on a voyage from Purvis Bay to Espiritu Santo — received. Buchanan put on flank speed to go to Cache′s assistance. Buchanan made radar contact at a range of 12,750 yards (11,660 m) with what her commanding officer described as a "fairly large" submarine on the surface 130 nautical miles (240 km; 150 mi) east-southeast of San Cristobal and 95 nautical miles (176 km; 109 mi) northwest of where Ro-37 had torpedoed Cache. After closing to a range of 2,000 yards (1,800 m), Buchanan illuminated Ro-37 with a searchlight in time to see her submerge. Buchanan then detected Ro-37 on sonar at a range of 1,250 yards (1,140 m). Buchanan dropped 53 depth charges over the next three hours and finally sank Ro-37 at 11°47′S 164°17′E. Buchanan′s crew observed an oil slick covering 5 square miles (13 km^{2}) on the surface, and the following morning a large amount of wooden and cork debris was seen floating in the vicinity of the sinking.

On 17 February 1944, the Imperial Japanese Navy declared Ro-37 to be presumed lost in the New Hebrides area with all 61 hands. She was stricken from the Navy list on 30 April 1944.
