= Karavia Bay =

Bay in East New Britain, Papua New Guinea

Coordinates: 4°18′S 152°11′E

Karavia Bay is a bay near Rabaul, New Britain, Papua New Guinea. Simpson Harbour is located to the north, while to the east is Blanche Bay.

The naval battle of Karavia Bay was fought in February 1944 during World War II in the bay. A number of shipwrecks are located in the bay.
