= USS Macaw =

1943 Chanticleer-class submarine

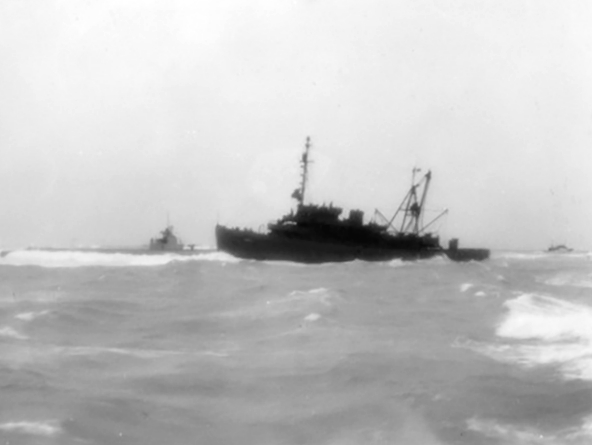
- Macaw aground at Midway, 16 January 1944

History

United States
- Name: USS Macaw
- Builder: Moore Dry Dock Company
- Laid down: 15 October 1941
- Launched: 12 July 1942
- Commissioned: 12 July 1943
- Stricken: 25 March 1944
- Fate: Sunk, 13 February 1944

General characteristics
- Class & type: Chanticleer-class submarine rescue ship
- Displacement: 1,780 long tons (1,809 t)
- Length: 251 ft 4 in (76.61 m)
- Beam: 42 ft (13 m)
- Draft: 14 ft 3 in (4.34 m)
- Speed: 16.5 knots (19.0 mph; 30.6 km/h)
- Complement: 122 officers and enlisted
- Armament: 2 × 3-inch/50-caliber guns; 2 × dct

The USS Macaw (ASR-11) was a Chanticleer-class submarine rescue ship in service with the United States Navy from 1943 to 1944.

== History ==
Macaw was laid down on 15 October 1941 by the Moore Dry Dock Company, Oakland, California; launched on12 July 1942; sponsored by Miss Valnessa Easton of Berkeley, Calif.; and commissioned exactly one year later.

Departing California on 28 August 1943, after shakedown and training exercises, Macaw steamed in convoy to Espiritu Santo, arriving on 2 October. Thence proceeding to Funafuti, via Wallis Island, she charted previously unknown reefs. She anchored off Funafuti on the 16th and remained until 13 November when she was ordered back to Pearl Harbor. After six weeks in Hawaii, Macaw departed for Midway Island.

=== Sinking ===
Macaw was scheduled to take part in the Marshall Islands campaign and was transiting back to Honolulu due to contaminated water tanks when she stopped at Midway Atoll. Suddenly on 18 January 1944, Macaw received orders to rescue a submarine from a nearby reef. She headed out as 20-35 knot winds from the west and rough seas pushed the submarine USS Flier (SS-250) onto the coral reef. Attempting to get a line to the stricken sub, the Macaw herself, under the command of the Midway harbor pilot, ran aground. The motor room and generator room were flooded with diesel oil and seawater.

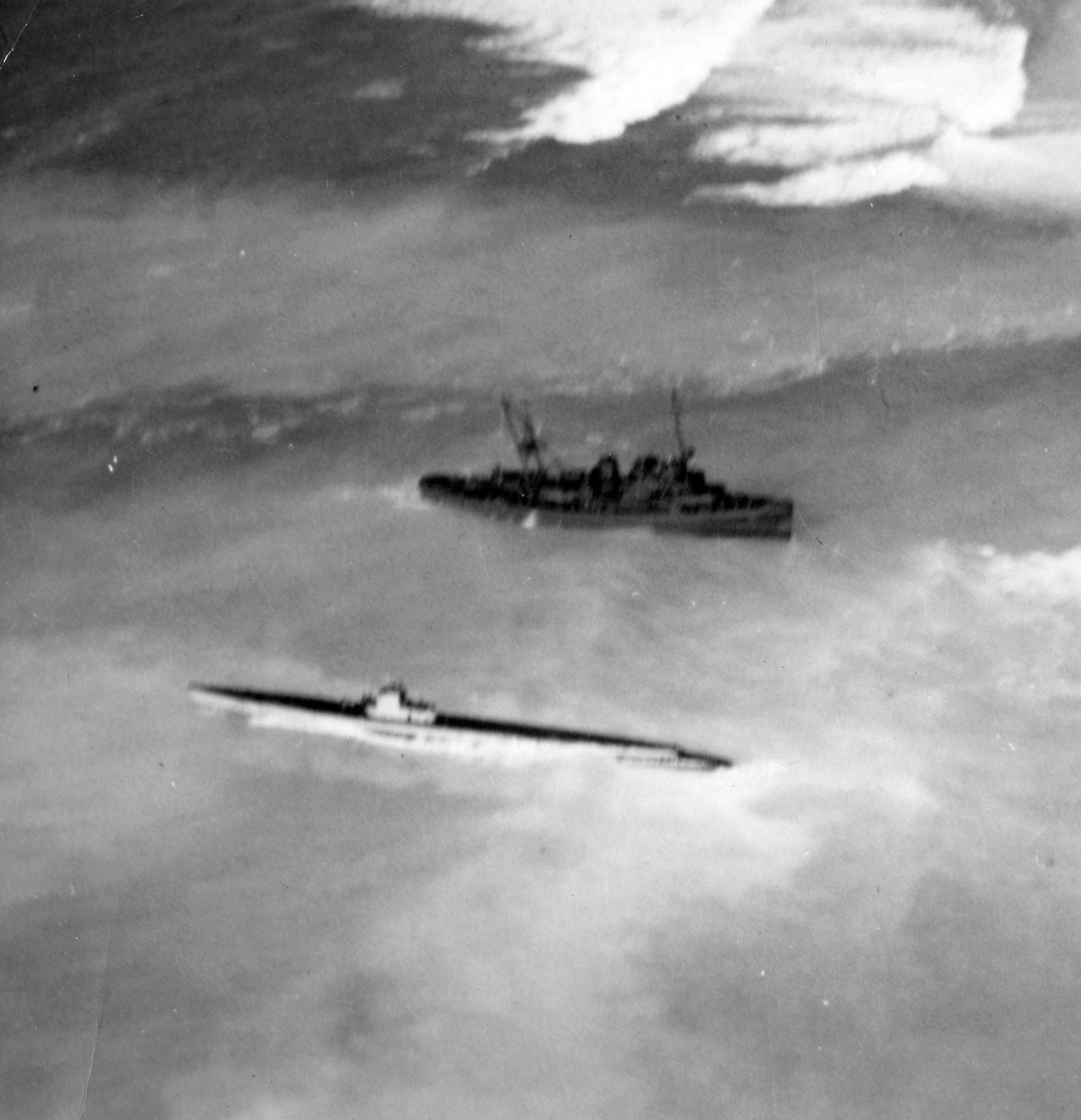
USS Flier and Macaw aground at Midway, 17 January 1944.

Breakers began striking the stern of the ship. Circa 7 m (23 feet) of Macaw's stern projected into the channel which threatened to further restrict passage to the submarine base. Keeping the channel clear was a high priority, therefore salvage attempts began as soon as possible. USS Clamp (ARS-33), arriving on 24 January, placed a crew on board Macaw after Flier was freed from the reef. Three separate attempts were made to refloat Macaw and pull her off, all without success. Due to bad weather conditions, salvage work was difficult and attempts to provision the crew on board were sometimes impossible. The weather continued to hamper salvage work during the first week of February. Wind and seas during the night of 11 February 1944 increased to a full gale. During the following day Macaw took on a heavy starboard list and seas began breaking over the ship's superstructure. Around 1800 hrs the pronounced list was suddenly reduced as Macaw's stern swung south and submerged in deeper water. The commanding officer, executive officer, and 20 Macaw crewmen remained on board during the night of 12 February. With deteriorating conditions, the remaining crew was forced to take shelter in the pilothouse and after 0230 hrs the crew was forced to abandon ship into the heavy seas. Two 6 m (19.7-foot) boats from Midway Naval Operating Base capsized during rescue attempts, with the loss of three lives. Searches during the following day recovered seventeen Macaw crewmen from atoll beaches, buoys, and distant spots in the lagoon. During the sinking her commanding officer, Paul Burton, and four crewmen died after abandoning the ship. Macaw was struck from the Navy list on 25 March 1944.

Following the sinking of Macaw, the decision was made to clear the channel and level the hulk in place. The crew from the USS Shackle (ARS-9) worked on the site through 9 September 1944. A total of 1,086 diving hours were spent salvaging equipment and materials and placing demolition charges. More than two and one-half tons of explosives were used.

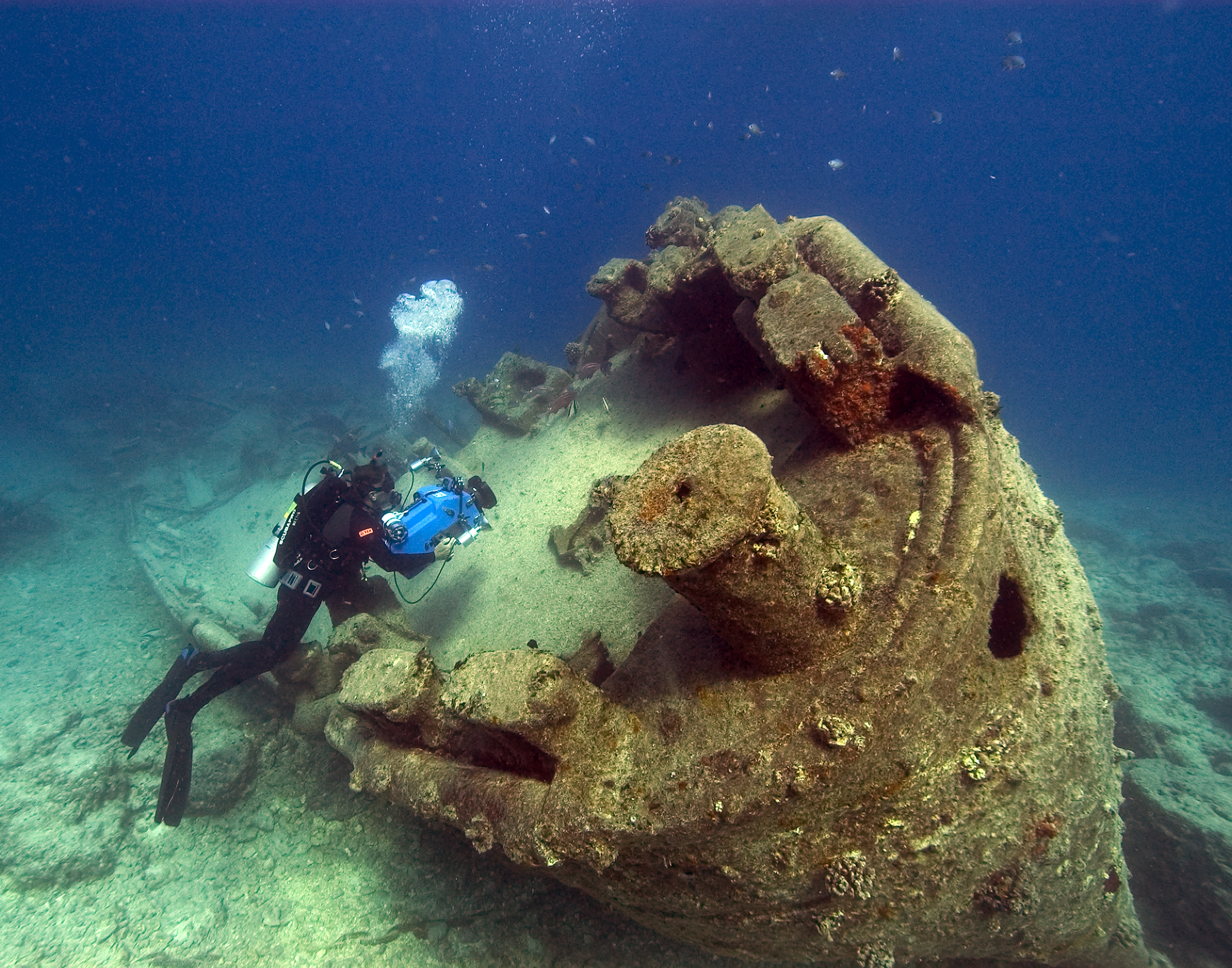
Wreck of Macaw, 2005.

Between 2003 and 2009 the wreck of Macaw was surveyed by the National Oceanic and Atmospheric Administration.
