= Battle of Karavia Bay =

Coordinates: 4.3°S 152.183°E

- Part of World War II, Pacific War
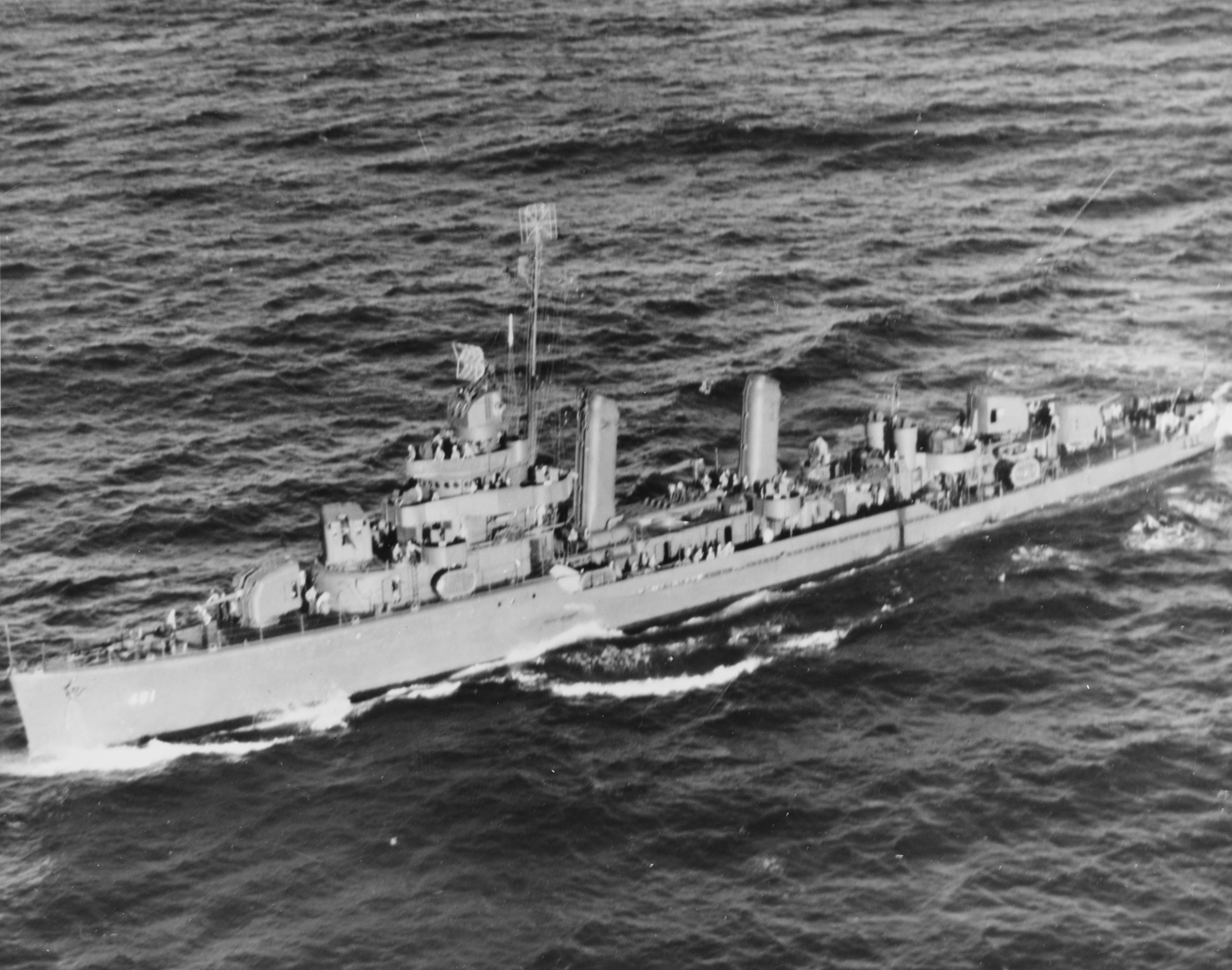
- USS Farenholt in May 1943.
Date	17–18 February 1944
Location	Karavia Bay, New Britain, Pacific Ocean
Result	American victory

Belligerents
United States	Japan

Commanders and leaders
Rodger F. Simpson	Unknown

Strength
5 destroyers	Land: ~10 artillery pieces 4 shore batteries Sea: 2 destroyers 2 transports

The Battle of Karavia Bay occurred in February 1944 and was the first surface engagement fought in the Rabaul area of New Britain during the Solomon Islands Campaign. A squadron of United States Navy warships attacked the harbor defenses of Karavia Bay and exchanged naval gunfire and torpedoes with two Japanese destroyers. The nighttime engagement ended with the silencing of the Japanese artillery and resulted in a blockade of the port. Two Japanese transports were also sunk in the fighting. Later, Allied forces landed on the island and destroyed the enemy garrison.

== Battle ==
Captain Rodger F. Simpson commanded Destroyer Squadron 12 of Task Group 38.4, which in February 1944, composed of the destroyers USS Farenholt, Buchanan, Lansdowne, Lardner and Woodworth. The five destroyers had orders to sail off the Duke of York Islands, in St. George's Channel, and direct their broadsides against targets along the New Britain coast. Captain Simpson's report of the battle follows:

"Part 1
1) During the night of 17–18 February 1944 Task Group 38.4 conducted an anti-shipping and harassment sweep of the Rabaul Area. The report of this action, is submitted herewith in accordance with references (c) and (d). All times given are local, minus eleven zone time.

2) In accordance with reference (a) and (b) Task Group 38.4 (Captain Rodger F. Simpson, U.S.N., Commander Destroyer Squadron TWELVE) composed of the U.S.S. FARENHOLT (CDS-12), U.S.S. BUCHANAN, U.S.S. LANSDOWNE (CDD-24), and U.S.S. LARDNER was directed to proceed from vicinity of Hathorn Sound, British Solomon Islands on the 17th of February 1944 in time to pass through a point 15 miles due west of Lat. 6°-28' Long. 154°-26' (Point Scrappy) at 1600, proceed at high speed to a point Lat. 5°-00' Long. 152°-42' (Point Rodger) to arrive at 2100, then up through St. George's Channel, around the west of Duke of York Island, pass into Blanche Bay, out south of Duke of York Island, down St. George's Channel to Point Rodger by 0330, then retire to Hathorn Sound. The principal assumption was that harassing the enemy would disrupt any of his aggressive plans and generally hasten his evacuation of that area. The U.S.S. WOODWORTH, at Purvis Bay in the early morning of 17 February, requested and obtained permission to rejoin the Squadron, which she did at about 1930, 17 February 1944.

3) Intelligence reports indicated that the most probable points of enemy concentrations as first, the township of Rabaul, second, encampment area between Kokopo and Ulaved, north coast of Gazelle Peninsula, and third, shipping at anchor in Karavia Bay. Shore batteries were indicated at Praed Point, Raluana Point and Cape Gazelle. There was no information on probable mine fields except at the entrance to Simpson-Karavia Harbors. Intelligence could not furnish any navigational information in addition to that contained in H.O. chart 2970, edition of 1925. Information on probable size and location of shore batteries and radar detection units was obtained prior to the bombardment, but it is estimated, from the volume of fire delivered by the shore batteries, that they are actually of larger caliber and more numerous than reported.

4) The state of the weather was definitely overcast enough for concealment of own forces. During the approach up St. George's Channel and until prior to commencing Phase I, surface visibility to approximately six miles, with a very low overcast. Sea calm; wind WNW, force 2. Moonrise was at 0050 the 18th of February 1944.

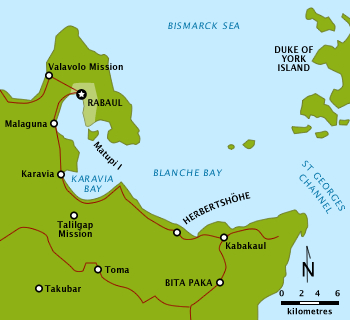
A map of New Britain showing Karavia Bay.

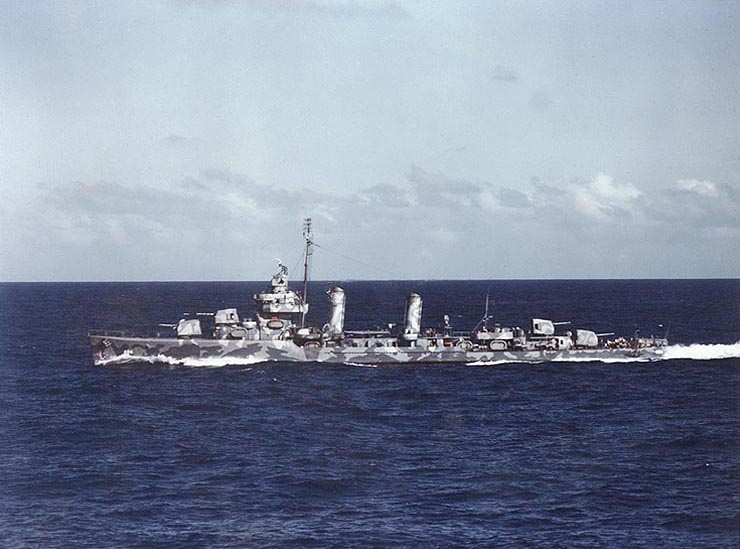
USS Buchanan in 1942.

Part 2

1) The approach was made with divisions in line of bearing, and was uneventful up to St. George's Channel (course 315° (T), speed 30 knots). At 2129 course was changed to 350° (T) at a point 5 miles north of Lat. 5°-00' S. Long. 152°-42' E. (Point Rodger). At 2207 course was changed to 345° (T). The intention was to stay about 5 miles to the west of the New Ireland coast. At 2230 course was changed to 005° (T). At 2240 the Squadron was brought into column. At 2304 changed course to 355° (T). Lights were sighted near Duke of York Island. They were identified as lighted sono buoy. At 2309 changed course to 315° (T). At 2345 course was changed to 270° (T) for anti-shipping sweep. The sweep proved negative. At 0017 course was changed to 120° (T) to return to the area of the Duke of York Islands. At 0046 course was changed to 160° (T) until leading ship reached Point Rooster (Lat. 4°-00' S. Long. 152°-21' E.) then at 0054 course was changed to 240° (T), ships in line of bearing 160° (T). Commenced making black (funnel) smoke on the approach. At 0104 Squadron was brought into column on course 160° (T) and speed was slowed to 20 knots. Several flashing sono buoys were observed around the approach to Karavia Bay. This ship was directed to fire counter battery. Opened fire on Praed Point shore batteries at 0107. At 0115 shifted counter battery fire to Raluana point to silence the shore battery there, the shore battery on Praed Point having been silenced with 141 rounds of ammunition. At 0116 changed course to 225° (T). At 0117 changed to 235° (T) and CIC commenced torpedo problem. At 0122 unmasked the starboard torpedo battery on course 180° (T). Checked gun fire at Raluana Point to fire torpedoes. Raluana Point battery silenced after this ship fired 56 rounds of ammunition at this battery. Heavy gunfire was observed inside Simpson Harbor-Karavia Bay, which was taken under fire by U.S.S. WOODWORTH and U.S.S. BUCHANAN on order of Commander Destroyer Squadron Twelve. It was determined later that this gunfire was from two enemy destroyers inside the bay. At 0124 fired low speed torpedoes on course 262° (T) into Karavia Bay, range 12,200 yards. The torpedoes were fired with a track to take them through the center of the mine field across the entrance to Karavia Bay (assumed to be the channel through the field) and directed to the spot reported as the most frequented anchorages inside Karavia Bay. At 0124 turned to 090° (T) to commence phase III shore bombardment. As the course was changed to the left, a salvo of what appeared to be 3" or larger landed about 50 yards off the starboard bow. At the same time several torpedo tracks were observed running down the starboard side at a distance of about 50 yards. Opened fore at 0126 to the south into Vunapopo bivouac and supply area, range 7660 yards. At 0132 changed to 100° (T) to clear Credner Island. At 0134 changed course to 120° (T). At 0136 came to 090° (T). At 1136 our observation plane dropped a stick of bombs on Cape Gazelle shore batteries. At 0137 ceased firing Vunapopo area, having expended 244 rounds of ammunition, to shift to Cape Gazelle shore battery which at that time opened fire on the formation. Commenced laying FS smoke in addition to black smoke. At 0140 opened fire on Cape Gazelle shore batteries. At this time a salvo of heavy caliber was heard to pass overhead and succeeding salvos continued to go over intermittently until the shore battery was finally silenced. At 0145 changed course to 070° (T) in order to pass through the 200 fathom spot at the center of channel between Duke of York Island and Cape Gazelle, this force having previously been directed to stay in water of depth over 200 fathoms. At 0150 changed course to 090° (T). Salvos were observed to be landing in the water off Cape Gazelle from the fire of ships astern. Firing only with the after 5" guns at 0152. At 0155, Cape Gazelle, approximately abeam to starboard, changed course to 120° (T), increased speed to 25 knots. At 0159 ceased firing, having expended 284 rounds of ammunition on the Cape Gazelle shore batteries. At 0200 a fire was reported on the fantail. The bloomer on the #4 gun had caught fire but was quickly extinguished. At 0200 increased speed to 30 knots. At 0202 ceased smoking on order from the Squadron Commander. Changed course to 165° (T). At 0205 a hang-fire was reported on gun #1. Gun #1 unloaded through the muzzle at 0210. At 0230 first unidentified plane reported. Until 0515, "bogies" were reported at intervals, singly and in groups (about four) (one dropped flares on starboard beam at about 0310). One "bogie" approached as close as 3 miles. Due to heavy overcast and rain squalls, the Squadron Commander felt reluctant to allow the ship to open fire and reveal our presence. At 0335 changed course to 135° (T) having cleared St. George's Channel."
