= USS Cache =

Suamico-class fleet oiler of the United States Navy

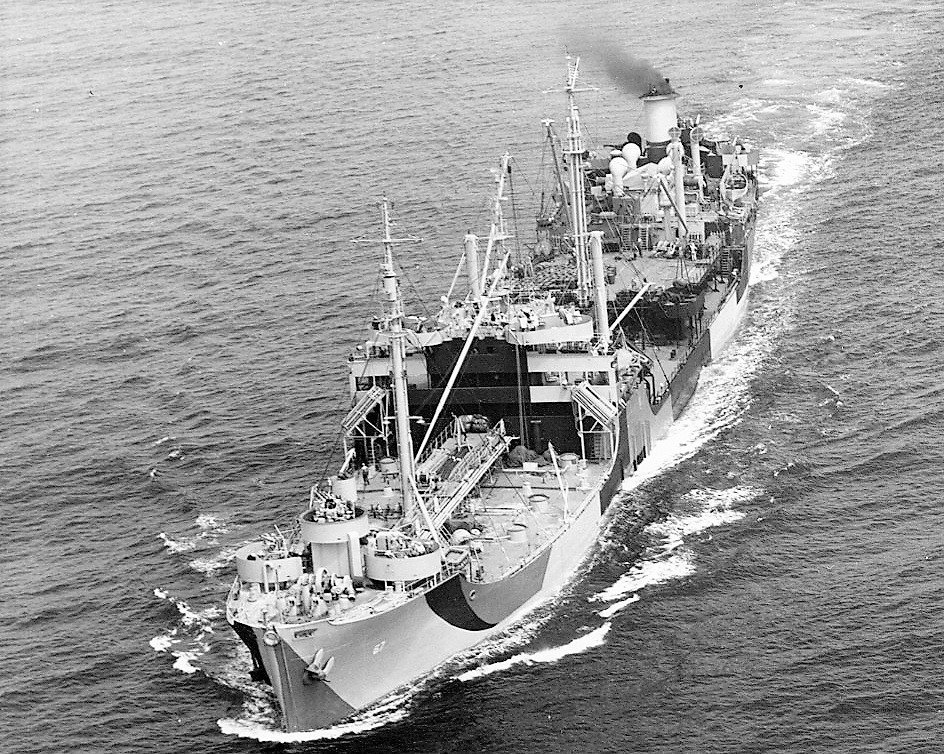
- Cache underway in late 1942

History

United States
- Name: USS Cache
- Namesake: Cache River in Arkansas
- Builder: Sun Shipbuilding & Drydock Co., Chester, Pennsylvania
- Launched: 7 September 1942
- Acquired: 28 September 1942
- Commissioned: 3 November 1942
- Decommissioned: 14 January 1946
- In service: 10 February 1948, as USNS Cache (T-AO-67)
- Out of service: May 1972
- Stricken: 31 March 1986
- Identification: IMO number: 8332825
- Honors and awards: 8 battle stars (World War II)
- Fate: Transferred to Maritime Administration for disposal, 2 February 1987

General characteristics
- Type: Suamico-class fleet replenishment oiler
- Displacement: 5,782 long tons (5,875 t) light; 21,880 long tons (22,231 t) full
- Length: 523 ft 6 in (159.56 m)
- Beam: 68 ft (21 m)
- Draft: 30 ft (9.1 m)
- Propulsion: Turbo-electric, single screw, 8,000 hp (5,966 kW)
- Speed: 15 knots (28 km/h)
- Capacity: 140,000 barrels (22,000 m^{3}) gasoline
- Complement: 225
- Armament: 1 × 5"/38 caliber gun; 4 × 3"/50 caliber guns; 4 × twin 40 mm AA guns

USS Cache (AO-67) was a Type T2-SE-A1 Suamico-class fleet oiler of the United States Navy.

The ship was built at the Sun Shipbuilding and Drydock Co. in Chester, Pennsylvania as the SS Stillwater (hull number 247), under a Maritime Commission contract (USMC number 322). Launched on 7 September 1942, sponsored by Mrs. J. Cook; the ship was acquired by the Navy on 28 September 1942. After conversion at the Maryland Drydock Company, Baltimore, Maryland, she was commissioned on 3 November 1942 and reported to the Atlantic Fleet.

== Service history ==
=== 1942–1943 ===
From 11 December 1942 to 25 February 1943, Cache carried oil from Gulf ports to Norfolk, Virginia and Argentia, Newfoundland. She cleared Norfolk on 19 March for Baytown, Texas, where she loaded diesel oil for Bora Bora, Society Islands, and Nouméa. She then returned from the South Pacific to San Pedro, California for repairs on 26 May.

Returning to Nouméa on 8 July 1943, Cache operated between Espiritu Santo and Guadalcanal until 4 August. Duty as station tanker at Efate and Espiritu Santo continued into December, when she sailed to refuel ships at sea.

=== 1944–1945 ===
While returning to Espiritu Santo on 22 January 1944, Cache was struck in the port side by a submarine torpedo. One man was killed, and Cache was severely damaged, but was able to make port under her own power. After temporary repairs, she sailed for San Pedro, California, for permanent repairs.

Cache returned to duty at Eniwetok on 20 June 1944 to begin almost continuous participation in the operations that forced the Japanese back across the Pacific to their homeland and ended the war. First came the Marianas operation, including the capture of Tinian, for which she fueled ships at sea in July and August 1944. Based at Manus from 26 August, Cache provided essential fuel for the attacks on, and invasion of, the western Caroline Islands, then based at Kossol Roads and Ulithi to support the ships which brought the war back to the Philippines in the assaults on Leyte and Luzon in fall and winter 1944–45. Continuing to operate from Ulithi, she fueled TF 51 for the invasion of Iwo Jima, then put to sea for the great task force raids which prepared the way for, and supported, the Okinawa operation. Later she operated in Okinawan waters, bringing fuel through the hazards of kamikaze attacks unscathed. She ended her war service in July 1945 as she sailed with the 3rd Fleet in its final stunning blows against the Japanese home islands. After carrying fuel to Tokyo Bay in September, she returned to the west coast.

=== 1946–1987 ===
Cache was decommissioned at San Francisco on 14 January 1946, and was transferred to the Maritime Commission in June 1946 for lay up in the National Defense Reserve Fleet.

Cache was reacquired by the Navy on 10 February 1948 and assigned to the Naval Transportation Service, where she operated under contract as USNS Cache (T-AO-67). She carried oil from Bahrain to Japan and the west coast until 1 October 1949, when she was transferred to the Military Sea Transportation Service. She continued to operate in a noncommissioned status until May 1972 when she went out of service and moved into Maritime Administration custody. The old oiler was finally struck from the Navy List on 31 March 1986, and officially transferred to the Maritime Administration for disposal on 2 February 1987.

== Awards ==
Cache received eight battle stars for World War II service.
